= Deaths in October 2010 =

The following is a list of notable deaths in October 2010.

Entries for each day are listed alphabetically by surname. A typical entry lists information in the following sequence:

- Name, age, country of citizenship at birth, subsequent country of citizenship (if applicable), reason for notability, cause of death (if known), and reference.

== October 2010 ==
=== 1 ===
- Georgy Arbatov, 87, Russian political scientist.
- Dezső Bundzsák, 82, Hungarian football player and coach.
- Ian Buxton, 72, English footballer and cricketer, natural causes.
- Charles Caruana, 77, Gibraltarian Roman Catholic bishop of Gibraltar (1998–2010), complications from a fall.
- Bobby Craig, 75, Scottish footballer.
- Audouin Dollfus, 85, French astronomer.
- Marshall Flaum, 85, American Emmy Award-winning director (The Undersea World of Jacques Cousteau), complications from hip surgery.
- Kilian Hennessy, 103, Irish patriarch of the Hennessy cognac company.
- Gerard Labuda, 93, Polish historian.
- Michel Mathieu, 66, French diplomat, cancer.
- David Aldrich Nelson, 78, American jurist, judge of the United States Court of Appeals for the Sixth Circuit.
- William W. Norton, 85, American screenwriter (Gator, Brannigan), heart attack.
- William C. Patrick III, 84, American scientist, expert on germs, bladder cancer.
- Pamela Rooks, 52, Indian film director and screenwriter, brain injury sustained in traffic collision.
- Mikhail Roshchin, 77, Russian playwright.
- Phillips Talbot, 95, American diplomat, Ambassador to Greece (1965–1969), President of the Asia Society (1970–1981).
- Lan Wright, 87, British science fiction writer.

=== 2 ===
- David M. Bailey, 44, American singer-songwriter, glioblastoma.
- Brenda Cowling, 85, British actress.
- Maurice Foster, 77, Canadian politician, MP for Algoma (1968–1993), pulmonary fibrosis.
- Robert Goodnough, 92, American abstract expressionist painter, pneumonia.
- Stephen Griew, 82, Canadian gerontologist.
- Ruby Heafner, 86, American baseball player.
- Art Jarvinen, 54, American composer, teacher and musician (The California EAR Unit).
- Kwa Geok Choo, 89, Singaporean lawyer, wife of Lee Kuan Yew, mother of Lee Hsien Loong.
- Sam Lesser, 95, British journalist.
- Gillian Lowndes, 74, British ceramicist.

=== 3 ===
- Maury Allen, 78, American sportswriter (The New York Post), lymphoma.
- Violet Biever, 98, American politician, member of the South Dakota House of Representatives.
- João Costa, 90, Portuguese Olympic fencer.
- Philippa Foot, 90, British philosopher.
- Sir Louis Le Bailly, 95, British admiral, Director-General of Intelligence.
- Claude Lefort, 86, French philosopher.
- Ben Mondor, 85, American baseball executive (Pawtucket Red Sox).
- Eddie Platt, 88, American saxophonist.
- Abraham Sarmiento, 88, Filipino jurist, Supreme Court Associate Justice (1987–1991).
- Dianne Whalen, 59, Canadian politician, Newfoundland and Labrador MHA for Conception Bay East and Bell Island (2003–2010), cancer.
- Ed Wilson, 65, Brazilian singer-songwriter, founder of Renato e Seus Blue Caps, cancer.

=== 4 ===
- William Birenbaum, 87, American educator (Antioch College), heart failure.
- Maurice Broomfield, 94, British photographer.
- Paula Escarameia, 50, Portuguese jurist (International Law Commission).
- Henrique de Senna Fernandes, 86, Macanese author.
- Gordon Lewis, 86, British aeronautical engineer.
- Rajan Mehra, 76, Indian cricket umpire.
- Reinhard Oehme, 82, German-born American particle physicist. (body found on this date)
- Peter Warr, 72, British racing driver and Formula One team principal (Lotus), heart attack.
- Brian Williams, 54, British fantasy illustrator
- Sir Norman Wisdom, 95, British comedian and actor, after long illness.

=== 5 ===
- Yakov Alpert, 99, Soviet-born American physicist.
- Roy Axe, 73, British car designer (Talbot Horizon, Rover 800), cancer.
- Roy Ward Baker, 93, British film director (A Night To Remember).
- Jack Berntsen, 69, Norwegian folk singer.
- Stan Bisset, 98, Australian rugby union player and World War II veteran.
- Alba Bouwer, 90, South African writer (Afrikaans children's literature), natural causes.
- Bernard Clavel, 87, French writer, natural causes.
- Mary Leona Gage, 71, American pageant queen, stripped of Miss USA (1957) title, heart failure.
- Karel Hardeman, 96, Dutch Olympic rower.
- Josephine Drivinski Hunsinger, 95, American politician. Member of the Michigan House of Representatives for District 1 (1973-1976).
- Moss Keane, 62, Irish rugby union player, bowel cancer.
- Jānis Klovāns, 75, Latvian chess master.
- Steve Lee, 47, Swiss musician (Gotthard), motorcycle accident.
- Julio Parise Loro, 90, Italian Roman Catholic prelate, Vicar Apostolic of Napo (1978–96).
- Karen McCarthy, 63, American politician, U.S. Representative from Missouri (1995–2005), Alzheimer's disease.
- Børge Raahauge Nielsen, 90, Danish Olympic bronze medal-winning (1948) rower.
- William Shakespeare, 61, Australian glam rock singer, heart attack.

=== 6 ===
- Norman Christie, 85, Scottish football player and manager (Montrose F.C.).
- Jean Debuf, 86, French weightlifter, Olympic bronze medalist (1956).
- Don Goodsir, 73, Australian educator, author, and environmentalist.
- Ivor Hale, 88, English cricketer.
- Rhys Isaac, 72, Australian historian, cancer.
- Antonie Kamerling, 44, Dutch actor and singer, suicide.
- Ralph Kercheval, 98, American football player.
- Gran Naniwa, 33, Japanese professional wrestler, myocardial blockage.
- Colette Renard, 85, French singer and actress, after long illness.
- Henry Sommerville, 82, Australian Olympic fencer.
- Piet Wijn, 81, Dutch comics creator.

=== 7 ===
- Ashab-ul-Haq, Bangladeshi politician.
- Metring David, 90, Filipino actress and comedian.
- Gail Dolgin, 65, American documentary filmmaker (Daughter from Danang), breast cancer.
- Kristin Johannsen, 52, American author, educator and environmentalist.
- Ljupčo Jordanovski, 57, Macedonian seismologist and politician, Acting President (2004).
- Chuck Leo, 76, American football player (Boston Patriots).
- Ian Morris, 53, New Zealand musician (Th' Dudes) and record producer.
- Milka Planinc, 85, Yugoslavian politician, Prime Minister (1982–1986).
- Guy Rouleau, 87, Canadian politician.
- A. Venkatachalam, 55, Indian politician, stabbed.

=== 8 ===
- Frank Bourgholtzer, 90, American television reporter, first full-time NBC News White House correspondent.
- S. S. Chandran, 69, Indian comic actor and politician, member of the Rajya Sabha (2001–2007), heart attack.
- Jim Fuchs, 82, American shot putter, Olympic bronze medalist (1948, 1952).
- Nils Hallberg, 89, Swedish actor.
- John Huchra, 61, American astronomer, heart attack.
- Ryō Ikebe, 92, Japanese actor (Gorath), blood poisoning.
- Reg King, 65, British singer (The Action), cancer.
- Simbara Maki, 71, Ivorian Olympic hurdler.
- Malcolm Mencer Martin, 89, Austrian-British pediatric endocrinologist, injuries sustained after being hit by car.
- Sue Miles, 66, British counter-culture activist and restaurateur.
- David F. Musto, 74, American drug control expert, heart attack.
- Maurice Neligan, 73, Irish surgeon, performed Ireland's first heart transplant.
- Linda Norgrove, 36, British aid worker and hostage, killed during rescue attempt.
- Mohammad Omar, Afghan politician, Governor of Kunduz Province, bomb blast.
- Pleasant Tap, 23, American thoroughbred racehorse, euthanized due to laminitis.
- Melvin Lane Powers, 68, American real estate developer, acquitted of murdering his uncle.
- Karl Prantl, 86, Austrian sculptor, stroke.
- Neil Richardson, 80, English composer, arranger and conductor.
- Dale Roberts, 70, American baseball player (New York Yankees).
- Albertina Walker, 81, American gospel music singer (The Caravans), respiratory failure.

=== 9 ===
- Maurice Allais, 99, French economist, winner of the Nobel Memorial Prize in Economic Sciences (1988).
- Mashallah Amin Sorour, 79, Iranian cyclist.
- Werner Buck 85, Dutch politician.
- Edmund Chong Ket Wah, 54, Malaysian politician, Member of Parliament (since 2004), motorcycle accident.
- Les Fell, 89, English footballer (Charlton Athletic, Crystal Palace).
- Aleksandr Matveyev, 84, Russian linguist, corresponding member of the Russian Academy of Sciences, natural causes.
- Isaia Rasila, 42, Fijian rugby player.
- Zecharia Sitchin, 90, Azerbaijani-born American author.

=== 10 ===
- Louis F. Bantle, 81, American chairman of U.S. Tobacco Company, lung cancer and emphysema.
- Reinhold Brinkmann, 76, German musicologist.
- Solomon Burke, 70, American R&B singer-songwriter ("Everybody Needs Somebody to Love"), natural causes.
- Ger Feeney, Irish Gaelic footballer.
- Les Gibbard, 64, New Zealand-born British political cartoonist, during routine operation.
- John Graysmark, 75, British production designer and art director (Ragtime, Gorillas in the Mist, Flash Gordon).
- Hwang Jang-yop, 87, North Korean politician and defector, apparent heart attack.
- Éric Joisel, 53, French wet-folding origami artist, lung cancer.
- Richard Lyon-Dalberg-Acton, 4th Baron Acton, 69, British politician.
- David H. McNerney, 79, American soldier and Medal of Honor recipient, lung cancer.
- Adán Martín Menis, 66, Spanish politician, President of the Canary Islands (2003–2007).
- Rex Rabanye, 66, South African jazz, fusion and soulful pop musician.
- Franz Xaver Schwarzenböck, 87, German Roman Catholic auxiliary bishop of Munich and Freising (1972–1998).
- Solly Sherman, 93, American football player (Chicago Bears).
- A. Edison Stairs, 85, Canadian businessman and politician, New Brunswick MLA (1960–1978) and Minister of Finance (1974–1976), natural causes.
- Walter Staley, 77, American Olympic bronze medal-winning (1952) equestrian.
- Alison Stephens, 40, British classical mandolinist, cervical cancer.
- Dame Joan Sutherland, 83, Australian dramatic coloratura soprano.
- Richard S. Van Wagoner, 64, American historian of Mormonism and Utah.
- Frank Verpillat, 63, French director and inventor.

=== 11 ===
- Tomislav Franjković, 79, Croatian Olympic silver medal-winning (1956) water polo player.
- Bill Harsha, 89, American politician, U.S. Representative from Ohio (1961–1981).
- Janet MacLachlan, 77, American actress (Sounder, Tightrope, Cagney & Lacey), cardiovascular complications.
- Hwang In-sung, 84, South Korean soldier and politician served as 25th prime minister of South Korea (1993).
- Richard Morefield, 81, American embassy worker, hostage during Iran Hostage Crisis.
- Marian P. Opala, 89, American jurist, Associate Justice of the Oklahoma Supreme Court (1978–2010), stroke.
- Claire Rayner, 79, British author.
- Georges Rutaganda, 51, Rwandan Hutu paramilitary leader, convicted war criminal, after long illness.
- Robert Tishman, 94, American real estate developer (Tishman Speyer).
- Donald H. Tuck, 87, Australian science fiction bibliographer.
- Ian Turner, 85, American Olympic gold medal-winning (1948) rower.

=== 12 ===
- Abul Hasnat Md. Abdul Hai, Bangladeshi politician.
- Manuel Alexandre, 92, Spanish actor, cancer.
- Jorge Ardila Serrano, 85, Colombian Roman Catholic prelate, Bishop of Girardot (1988–2001).
- Austin Ardill, 93, British politician, member of the Parliament of Northern Ireland for Carrick.
- Challenger, 51, Bangladeshi actor.
- Michael Galloway, 85, American actor.
- Michel Hugo, 79, French-born American cinematographer (Dynasty, Melrose Place, Mission: Impossible), lung cancer.
- Angelo Infanti, 71, Italian actor, cardiac arrest.
- Lionel W. McKenzie, 91, American economist.
- Dick Miles, 85, American table tennis player, natural causes.
- Woody Peoples, 67, American football player (San Francisco 49ers, Philadelphia Eagles).
- Pepín, 78, Spanish footballer.
- Belva Plain, 95, American novelist (Evergreen).

=== 13 ===
- Juan Carlos Arteche, 53, Spanish footballer, cancer.
- Eddie Baily, 85, English footballer (Tottenham Hotspur).
- Vernon Biever, 87, American photographer.
- General Johnson, 69, American musician and record producer (Chairmen of the Board), complications of lung cancer.
- Khoisan X, 55, South African political activist, stroke.
- Mary Malcolm, 92, British BBC announcer and television personality.
- Marzieh, 86, Iranian singer, cancer.
- Sol Steinmetz, 80, Hungarian-born American lexicographer and linguist, pneumonia.

=== 14 ===
- Malcolm Allison, 83, English footballer (West Ham United) and manager (Manchester City, Crystal Palace), after long illness.
- Glenn J. Ames, 55, American historian, cancer.
- Carla Del Poggio, 84, Italian actress.
- Louis Henkin, 92, American international human rights law expert and academic (Columbia Law School).
- Alain Le Bussy, 63, Belgian science fiction author, complications following throat surgery.
- Simon MacCorkindale, 58, British actor (Falcon Crest, Death on the Nile, Manimal, Casualty), bowel cancer.
- Benoît Mandelbrot, 85, Polish-born American mathematician, pioneer of the study of fractals, pancreatic cancer.
- Constance Reid, 92, American mathematics author and biographer.
- Hermann Scheer, 66, German politician, member of the Bundestag (1980–2010) and Right Livelihood Award laureate (1999), after short illness.
- Larry Siegfried, 71, American basketball player (Boston Celtics), heart attack.

=== 15 ===
- Jim Dougal, 65, Northern Irish journalist (BBC News, RTÉ, UTV).
- Mildred Fay Jefferson, 84, American anti-abortion activist, first black woman to graduate from Harvard Medical School.
- N. Paul Kenworthy, 85, American cinematographer (The Living Desert, The Vanishing Prairie), thyroid cancer.
- Georges Mathé, 88, French oncologist and immunologist, bone marrow transplant pioneer.
- Vera Rózsa, 93, Hungarian voice teacher.
- Johnny Sheffield, 79, American actor (Tarzan Finds a Son!, Bomba, the Jungle Boy, Knute Rockne All American), heart attack.

=== 16 ===
- Barbara Billingsley, 94, American actress, polymyalgia (Leave It to Beaver, Airplane!, Muppet Babies).
- Alfredo Bini, 83, Italian film producer.
- Jack Butterfield, 91, Canadian-born American sports administrator, President of the American Hockey League (1969–1994).
- Chao-Li Chi, 83, Chinese-born American actor (Falcon Crest).
- Giannis Dalianidis, 86, Greek film director and screenwriter (Oi Thalassies oi Hadres, O katergaris), multiple organ dysfunction syndrome.
- Eyedea, 28, American rapper and musician (Eyedea & Abilities).
- Friedrich Katz, 83, Austrian anthropologist and historian, cancer.
- Masud Husain Khan, 91, Indian linguist.
- Ioannis Ladas, 90, Greek army officer, member of the 1967–1974 military junta.
- Betty S. Murphy, 77, American lawyer, first woman to chair the National Labor Relations Board, pneumonia.
- Aldo Maria Lazzarín Stella, 83, Italian-born Chilean Roman Catholic prelate, Vicar Apostolic of Aysén (1989–1998).
- Valmy Thomas, 84, Puerto Rican baseball player.
- Leigh Van Valen, 75, American evolutionary biologist (Red Queen's Hypothesis), respiratory infection.

=== 17 ===
- Åsmund Apeland, 80, Norwegian politician.
- Jake Dunlap, 85, Canadian football player (Ottawa Rough Riders), cancer.
- John Baird Finlay, 81, Canadian politician, MP for Oxford (1993–2004).
- Emmanuel Lê Phong Thuận, 79, Vietnamese Roman Catholic prelate, Bishop of Cân Tho (since 1990).
- Joe Lis, 64, American baseball player, prostate cancer.
- Freddy Schuman, 85, American baseball fan (New York Yankees), heart attack.
- Michael Tabor, 63, American Black Panther Party member, complications from a stroke.
- Dennis Taylor, 56, American saxophonist, heart attack.

=== 18 ===
- Luc Agbala, 63, Togo football player and referee.
- Marion Brown, 79, American jazz saxophonist.
- Consuelo Crespi, 82, American-born Italian countess, fashion model and editor, stroke.
- Eight Finger Eddie, 85, American hippie.
- David Fontana, 75, British psychologist and parapsychologist, pancreatic cancer.
- Margaret Gwenver, 84, American actress (Guiding Light).
- Hans Hägele, 70, German footballer, suicide by jumping.
- Mel Hopkins, 75, Welsh footballer (Tottenham Hotspur, Brighton & Hove Albion).
- Peng Chong, 95, Chinese politician, former National Committee member.
- Billy Raimondi, 97, American baseball player
- Doug Wilson, 90, British Olympic athlete.
- Ken Wriedt, 83, Australian politician, Senator for Tasmania (1967–1980), Leader of the Tasmanian Opposition (1982–1986).

=== 19 ===
- Jean Asfar, 92, Egyptian Olympic fencer.
- Tom Bosley, 83, American actor (Happy Days, Father Dowling Mysteries, Fiorello!), Tony winner (1960), heart failure.
- Craig Charron, 42, American ice hockey player, stomach cancer.
- Graham Crowden, 87, Scottish actor (If...., A Very Peculiar Practice, Waiting For God).
- André Mahé, 90, French road bicycle racer.
- Paul Steven Miller, 49, American disability rights leader, cancer.
- John Waterlow, 94, British physiologist.

=== 20 ===
- Francisco Batistela, 79, Brazilian Roman Catholic prelate, bishop of Bom Jesus da Lapa (1990–2009).
- Otey Clark, 95, American baseball player (Boston Red Sox).
- W. Cary Edwards, 66, American politician, New Jersey State Assemblyman (1978–1982) and Attorney General (1986–1989), cancer.
- Herbert Enderton, 74, American mathematician and logician, leukemia.
- Mariano Ferreyra, 23, Argentine left-wing militant, shot.
- Aleksandar Goldštajn, 98, Croatian law scholar, writer and constitutional court judge.
- Bob Guccione, 79, American photographer and founder of Penthouse, lung cancer.
- Eva Ibbotson, 85, Austrian-born British novelist (Journey to the River Sea, The Secret of Platform 13).
- Coleman Jacoby, 95, American television comedy writer, pancreatic cancer.
- D. Geraint James, 88, Welsh doctor.
- Bill Jennings, 85, American baseball player (St. Louis Browns).
- Robert Katz, 77, American writer, complications from cancer surgery.
- Max Kohnstamm, 96, Dutch historian and diplomat.
- Farooq Leghari, 70, Pakistani politician, President (1993–1997), heart complications.
- Sir George Mallet, 87, Saint Lucian politician, Governor-General (1996–1997), cancer.
- Eduard Novák, 63, Czech ice hockey player, Olympic silver (1976) and bronze (1972) medalist.
- Jenny Oropeza, 53, American politician, California State Assemblywoman (2000–2006) and State Senator (since 2006), after long illness.
- Robert Paynter, 82, British cinematographer (Trading Places, An American Werewolf in London, Michael Jackson's Thriller).
- Harvey Phillips, 80, American tuba player, Parkinson's disease.
- Gilbert Planté, 69, French Olympic footballer.
- Julian Roberts, 80, British librarian.
- Tony Roig, 81, American baseball player (Philadelphia Phillies, Washington Senators), after long illness.
- Parthasarathy Sharma, 62, Indian Test cricketer (1974–1977), cancer.
- Tikhon Stepanov, 47, Russian Orthodox prelate, Bishop of Arkhangelsk and Kholmogory (since 1996), heart attack.
- Ari Up, 48, German-born British punk musician (The Slits), cancer.
- Wendall Woodbury, 68, American television journalist and host (WGAL-TV), lymphoma.

=== 21 ===
- Antonio Alatorre, 88, Mexican philologist.
- Mustapha Anane, 60, Algerian footballer, after long illness.
- A. Ayyappan, 61, Indian poet.
- José Carbajal, 66, Uruguayan singer, guitarist, and composer (Los Olimareños), cardiac arrest.
- Sir Leslie Froggatt, 90, British-born Australian business executive, CEO of Shell Australia (1969–1980), complications from Parkinson's disease.
- Kjell Landmark, 80, Norwegian poet and politician, cancer.
- James F. Neal, 81, American jurist, prosecuted Watergate figures, cancer.
- Howard Harry Rosenbrock, 89, British electrical engineer and scientist.
- Loki Schmidt, 91, German environmentalist, wife of Helmut Schmidt, illness after a fall and complications of a broken foot.
- Natasha Spender, 91, British musician and writer, widow of Stephen Spender.

=== 22 ===
- Alex Anderson, 90, American cartoonist, created characters for The Rocky and Bullwinkle Show and Crusader Rabbit.
- Donald A. Andrews, 69, Canadian correctional psychologist and criminologist.
- Rune Blomqvist, 85, Swedish Olympic sprint canoer.
- Arthur M. Brazier, 89, American pastor and civil rights activist.
- Alí Chumacero, 92, Mexican writer and poet, pneumonia.
- Bill Henderson, 86, Northern Irish politician and newspaper proprietor.
- Helen Hunley, 90, Canadian politician, Lieutenant Governor of Alberta (1985–1991).
- Anne McDonald, 49, Australian disability rights activist, heart attack.
- Franz Raschid, 56, German footballer, pancreatic cancer.
- Eio Sakata, 90, Japanese professional Go player, aortic aneurysm.
- Denis Simpson, 59, Canadian actor (Polka Dot Door) and singer, brain hemorrhage.
- Kjell Stormoen, 89, Norwegian actor and theater director.
- René Villiger, 79, Swiss painter, cancer.

=== 23 ===
- Ralph Belknap Baldwin, 98, American planetary scientist.
- Vince Banonis, 89, American football player (Chicago Cardinals, Detroit Lions).
- Ior Bock, 68, Finnish actor and tour guide, stabbing.
- George Cain, 66, American author, kidney failure.
- Fran Crippen, 26, American swimmer, heart attack.
- Leo Cullum, 68, American cartoonist (The New Yorker), cancer.
- Robert Fitzpatrick, 73, American manager and actor, lung disease.
- S. Neil Fujita, 89, American graphic designer, complications of a stroke.
- Princess Irmingard of Bavaria, 87, German noblewoman.
- Donald Leifert, 59, American science fiction actor.
- Chhewang Nima, 43, Nepalese mountaineer and guide, avalanche.
- Michael Porter, 59, American wrestling announcer.
- Stanley Tanger, 87, American businessman, founder of Tanger Factory Outlet Centers.
- David Thompson, 48, British-born Barbadian politician, Prime Minister (since 2008), pancreatic cancer.
- Tom Winslow, 69, American folk musician, complications from a stroke.

=== 24 ===
- Ralph Anderson, 86, American architect, kidney cancer.
- Les Anthony, 88, Welsh rugby union player.
- Bob Courtney, 87, British-born South African broadcaster and actor.
- Mike Esposito, 83, American comic book artist (Spider-Man, The Flash, Wonder Woman).
- Georges Frêche, 72, French politician, cardiac arrest.
- Fritz Grösche, 69, German footballer and coach, cancer.
- Linda Hargrove, 61, American singer-songwriter.
- Andy Holmes, 51, British Olympic gold (1984, 1988) and bronze (1988) medal-winning rower, leptospirosis.
- Franciszek Jarecki, 79, Polish-born American jet pilot and defector.
- Lamont Johnson, 88, American actor and television director (The Twilight Zone, The Execution of Private Slovik), heart failure.
- Alex Oakley, 84, Canadian Olympic race walker.
- Pan Jin-yu, 96, Taiwanese last speaker of the Pazeh language.
- Ignacio Ramírez de Haro, 15th Count of Bornos, 92, Spanish noble, 15th Count of Bornos, Grandee of Spain, legionella.
- Burton B. Roberts, 88, American judge, New York Supreme Court Justice (1973–1998), respiratory failure.
- Willie Rutherford, 65, Australian soccer player.
- Sylvia Sleigh, 94, American painter, complications of a stroke.
- Jack Stackpoole, 93, Australian cricketer.
- David Stahl, 60, American conductor, lymphoma.
- Joseph Stein, 98, American playwright (Fiddler on the Roof, Zorba).

=== 25 ===
- Hans Arnold, 85, Swiss-born Swedish artist.
- Sonny Ates, 75, American racecar driver.
- Lisa Blount, 53, American actress (An Officer and a Gentleman, Prince of Darkness, Profit), Oscar winner (2002).
- Sonia Burgess, 63, British immigration lawyer.
- Jeff Carter, 82, Australian photographer and author.
- Valentina Gaganova, 78, Russian textile worker and politician.
- Richard T. Gill, 82, American opera singer, heart failure.
- Douglas Hooper, 83, English psychotherapist, traffic collision.
- Gregory Isaacs, 59, Jamaican reggae singer, lung cancer.
- Andreas Maurer, 91, Austrian politician, Landeshauptmann of Lower Austria (1966–1981).
- Vesna Parun, 88, Croatian writer.
- Ada Polak, 96, Norwegian art historian.
- Rudy Rufer, 83, American baseball player (New York Giants).
- Roy Skinner, 80, American college basketball coach (Vanderbilt), respiratory failure.

=== 26 ===
- Jaroslava Komárková, 83, Czech Olympic athlete.
- Glen Little, 84, American circus performer ("Frosty the Clown").
- Mbah Maridjan, 83, Indonesian spiritual guardian of Mount Merapi (1982–2010), pyroclastic flow from Mount Merapi.
- Ricardo Montez, 87, Gibraltarian character actor.
- Paul the Octopus, 2, British-born World Cup oracle octopus (Sea Life Centre in Oberhausen, Germany), natural causes.
- James Phelps, 78, American gospel and R&B singer, complications of diabetes.
- Ana María Romero de Campero, 67, Bolivian journalist and politician, President of the Senate of Bolivia (2010), colorectal cancer.
- Romeu Tuma, 79, Brazilian politician, Senator (1995–2010), multiple organ dysfunction syndrome.
- Ray Watson, 87, Australian judge.

=== 27 ===
- Mary Emma Allison, 93, American co-creator of Trick-or-Treat for UNICEF.
- Denise Borino-Quinn, 46, American actress (The Sopranos), liver cancer.
- Gene Fodge, 79, American baseball player (Chicago Cubs).
- William Griffiths, 88, British Olympic silver medal-winning (1948) field hockey player.
- Chris Gulker, 59, American photographer, programmer and writer, brain cancer.
- Néstor Kirchner, 60, Argentine politician, President (2003–2007), First Gentleman (since 2007), Secretary General of UNASUR (2010), heart attack.
- Paul Kolton, 87, American chairman of the American Stock Exchange (1972–1977), lymphoma.
- Luigi Macaluso, 62, Italian businessman, President and Chairman of the Sowind Group, heart attack.
- Owen B. Pickett, 80, American politician, U.S. Representative from Virginia (1987–2001).
- Saqr bin Mohammed Al Qasimi, 92, Emirati ruler of Ras al-Khaimah (since 1948).
- Hall W. Thompson, 87, American developer of a country club that did not admit black members.
- James Wall, 92, American actor (Captain Kangaroo) and stage manager, after short illness.

=== 28 ===
- Isabella Abbott, 91, American ethnobotanist, first native Hawaiian to receive a doctorate in science.
- Ibrahim Ahmad Abd al-Sattar Muhammad, 54, Iraqi general, Armed Forces Chief of Staff (1999–2003), cancer.
- Harry Baldwin, 90, English footballer.
- Jack Brokensha, 84, Australian jazz musician, composer and arranger.
- Jesús Mateo Calderón Barrueto, 90, Peruvian Roman Catholic prelate, Bishop of Puno (1972–1998).
- Robert Dickie, 46, British champion boxer, heart attack.
- Robert Ellenstein, 87, American character actor.
- Erling Fløtten, 72, Norwegian politician.
- Watts Humphrey, 83, American software engineer.
- Gerard Kelly, 51, British actor (City Lights), brain aneurysm.
- Liang Congjie, 78, Chinese environmentalist (Friends of Nature), lung infection.
- James MacArthur, 72, American actor (Hawaii Five-O, Swiss Family Robinson, Hang 'Em High).
- Jonathan Motzfeldt, 72, Greenlandic politician, Prime Minister (1979–1991; 1997–2002), brain hemorrhage.
- Paddy Mullins, 91, Irish racehorse trainer.
- Maurice Murphy, 75, British musician (London Symphony Orchestra).
- Ehud Netzer, 76, Israeli archaeologist, discovered tomb of Herod the Great, injuries from a fall.
- Walter Payton, 68, American jazz bassist and sousaphonist, complications from a stroke.
- Anna Prieto Sandoval, 76, American tribal leader (Sycuan Band of the Kumeyaay Nation), Native American gaming enterprises pioneer, diabetes.
- Jean Schmit, 79, Luxembourgish Olympic cyclist.
- John Sekula, 41, American guitarist (Mushroomhead).

=== 29 ===
- Gerhard Beyer, 69, German Olympic sports shooter.
- Marcelino Camacho, 92, Spanish trade unionist.
- Ronnie Clayton, 76, English footballer (Blackburn Rovers).
- Geoffrey Crawley, 83, British photographer and editor, debunked Cottingley Fairies mystery.
- Stefan Florescu, 83, American paralympic swimmer and table tennis player.
- Mervyn Haisman, 82, British writer (Doctor Who).
- George Hickenlooper, 47, American documentary filmmaker, accidental drug overdose.
- Yisrael Katz, 82, Israeli public servant and government minister.
- Antonio Mariscal, 95, Mexican Olympic diver.
- Bärbel Mohr, 46, German author.
- Bernard de Nonancourt, 90, French businessman and member of the French Resistance, owner of Laurent-Perrier.
- Karlo Sakandelidze, 82, Georgian actor.
- Takeshi Shudo, 61, Japanese writer, creator of Pokémon, subarachnoid hemorrhage.

=== 30 ===
- Randall Dale Adams, 61, American anti–death penalty activist, brain tumor.
- Douglas Argent, 89, British television producer and director (Fawlty Towers).
- Vladimir Arsenyev, 62, Russian Africanist, ethnographer, and exhibition curator.
- John Benson, 67, Scottish footballer and manager, after short illness.
- Romano Bonagura, 80, Italian bobsledder, Olympic silver medalist (1964).
- Leopoldo Alfredo Bravo, 50, Argentine diplomat, ambassador to Russia, cancer.
- Édouard Carpentier, 84, French-born Canadian professional wrestler.
- Ina Clare, 77, British actress (EastEnders).
- Meta Elste-Neumann, 91, American gymnast, Olympic bronze medalist (1948), cancer.
- Arthur Bernard Lewis, 84, American television producer and writer (Dallas), complications from pneumonia.
- Ananías Maidana, 87, Paraguayan teacher and politician, prostate cancer.
- Harry Mulisch, 83, Dutch writer (The Assault, The Discovery of Heaven), cancer.
- Nachi Nozawa, 72, Japanese voice actor, lung cancer.
- Clyde Summers, 91, American academic, complications of a stroke.
- Mateus Feliciano Augusto Tomás, 52, Angolan Roman Catholic prelate, Bishop of Namibe (since 2009).
- Howard Van Hyning, 74, American percussionist (New York City Opera), myocardial infarction.

=== 31 ===
- Michel d'Aillières, 86, French politician.
- Evelyn Baghtcheban, 82, Turkish-Persian opera singer.
- Manfred Bock, 69, German Olympic decathlete, heart attack.
- Max Barandun, 68, Swiss Olympic sprinter.
- Roger Holloway, 76, British Anglican priest.
- Dick Loepfe, 88, American football player (Chicago Cardinals).
- Maurice Lucas, 58, American basketball player (Portland Trail Blazers, Phoenix Suns, Los Angeles Lakers), bladder cancer.
- John Selfridge, 83, American mathematician.
- János Simon, 81, Hungarian basketball player, EuroBasket winner (1955).
- Ted Sorensen, 82, American lawyer, White House counsel (1961–1964), stroke.
- Artie Wilson, 90, American baseball player (New York Giants, Birmingham Black Barons), Alzheimer's disease.
