= 2010 in film =

2010 in film is an overview of events, including the highest-grossing films, award ceremonies, critics' lists of the best films of 2010, festivals, a list of country-specific lists of films released, and notable deaths. There was a dramatic increase and prominence in the use of 3D-technology in filmmaking after the success of Avatar in the format, with releases such as Alice in Wonderland, Clash of the Titans, Toy Story 3, Shrek Forever After and numerous other titles being released in 3D formats. 20th Century Fox and Republic Pictures celebrated their 75th anniversaries.

== Evaluation of the year ==
In his article highlighting the best movies of 2010, Richard Brody of The New Yorker said:

"At times it feels as if we’re living in something of a cinematic golden age, but one that’s altogether different from earlier halcyon days. Where some celebrate the former genius of the system to explain an earlier day’s proliferation of fine movies, now the system is something of a blunderer that often flings itself into follies or even crushes inspiration under its weight, but sometimes gets carried away, for reasons good or bad, and hands surprising control of vast resources over to artists who make stunningly audacious and personal use of them. The best filmmakers working in Hollywood have a passionate grasp of the cinematic past, but they don’t swoon over its polish or emulate its styles, they excavate it for its raw materials. There’s also a ferment here of independent filmmaking that liberates young people who, in earlier times, might have had to scuffle or supplicate for years while angling for a practical chance that now, with video, and with adequate effort, they can seize for themselves. Some of these independents have developed distinctive methods as well as aesthetics—regarding subject matter, picture, and performance—that are apt for the means of production. They make their lives, their homes, their families, their problems, and even their art the focus of their movies, and because, in their individuality, they share much with others in their generation, their stories, at their best—reflecting the age-old clashes and strivings of talented and ambitious youths in life, love, and art—reverberate deeply and widely. Meanwhile, the proliferation of arthouse cinemas and the sudden availability of classics on DVD and via Netflix go hand in hand with the rise of their art: their fierce focus on the immediate and the intimate includes the intensely personal experience of movies—whether treasures from the history of cinema or instant classics newly arrived from around the world. And, thanks to the Internet’s rapidity of ripple-effects that carry word from bloggers and enthusiasts to the world at large, the independent aesthetic and its artists have quickly had an impact on the Hollywood mainstream, in salutary ways."

== Highest-grossing films ==
The top 10 films released in 2010 by worldwide gross are as follows:

Highest-grossing films of 2010
Rank	Title	Distributor	Worldwide gross
1	Toy Story 3	Disney	$1,066,969,703
2	Alice in Wonderland	Disney	$1,025,467,110
3	Harry Potter and the Deathly Hallows – Part 1	Warner Bros.	$960,897,696
4	Inception	Warner Bros.	$828,258,695 (Note: Excludes grosses from subsequent re-releases.)
5	Shrek Forever After	Paramount	$752,600,867
6	The Twilight Saga: Eclipse	Summit	$698,491,347
7	Iron Man 2	Paramount	$623,933,331
8	Tangled	Disney	$592,461,732
9	Despicable Me	Universal	$543,113,985
10	How to Train Your Dragon	Paramount	$494,878,759

=== Box office records ===
- 2010 was the first year to have two films cross the billion-dollar milestone.
  - Toy Story 3 was the first animated film to gross $1 billion, and is currently the twelfth highest-grossing animated film ever worldwide. This is also the first time that five animated films have been present in the Top 10 highest-grossing films of the year; two of them are in the Top 5.
  - Toy Story 3 surpassed Pirates of the Caribbean: Dead Man's Chest (2006) as the highest-grossing film ever distributed by Disney. It was later surpassed by The Avengers in 2012.
- The year saw four films debut with more than $100 million, breaking the opening record of 2007 with three releases, and 2004 with two.

== Events ==
January
17 – The 67th Golden Globe Awards winners were announced.
21 – The nominations of the 63rd BAFTA Awards were announced.
23 – The 16th Screen Actors Guild Awards winners were announced.

February
1 – The nominations of the 30th Golden Raspberry Awards were announced.
2 – The nominations of the 82nd Academy Awards were announced.
11 to 21 – The 60th Berlin International Film Festival was held.
21 – The 64th BAFTA Awards winners were announced

March
6 – The 30th Golden Raspberry Awards winners were announced.
7 – The 82nd Academy Awards winners were announced.
28 – The 15th Empire Awards winners were announced.

May
12 to 23 – The 63rd annual Cannes Film Festival was held.

June
6 – The 2010 MTV Movie Awards winners were announced.

July
9 – Despicable Me is released in theaters, launching one of the highest-grossing franchises in film history.
22 to August 1 – The 10th Era New Horizons Film Festival was held.

September
1 to 11 – The 67th annual Venice Film Festival was held.
9 to 19 – The 35th annual Toronto Film Festival was held.

October
8 to 17 – The 26th Warsaw International Film Festival was held.
20 to 24 – The 1st American Film Festival was held in Wrocław.

November
26 to 28 – The 4th Dawn Breakers International Film Festival was held.
26 to December 5 – The 12th Jakarta International Film Festival was held.

December
4 – The 23rd European Film Awards was held.
11 – The 52nd Australian Film Institute Awards winners were announced.

== Awards ==
Category/Organization	16th Critics' Choice Awards January 14, 2011	68th Golden Globe Awards January 16, 2011		Producers, Directors, Screen Actors, and Writers Guild Awards	64th BAFTA Awards February 13, 2011	83rd Academy Awards February 27, 2011
Category/Organization	16th Critics' Choice Awards January 14, 2011	Drama	Musical or Comedy	Producers, Directors, Screen Actors, and Writers Guild Awards	64th BAFTA Awards February 13, 2011	83rd Academy Awards February 27, 2011
Best Film	The Social Network		The Kids Are All Right	The King's Speech		
Best Director	David Fincher; The Social Network			Tom Hooper; The King's Speech	David Fincher; The Social Network	Tom Hooper; The King's Speech
Best Actor	Colin Firth; The King's Speech		Paul Giamatti; Barney's Version	Colin Firth; The King's Speech		
Best Actress	Natalie Portman; Black Swan		Annette Bening; The Kids Are All Right	Natalie Portman; Black Swan		
Best Supporting Actor	Christian Bale; The Fighter				Geoffrey Rush; The King's Speech	Christian Bale; The Fighter
Best Supporting Actress	Melissa Leo; The Fighter				Helena Bonham Carter; The King's Speech	Melissa Leo; The Fighter
Best Screenplay, Adapted	Aaron Sorkin; The Social Network	Aaron Sorkin; The Social Network		Aaron Sorkin; The Social Network		
Best Screenplay, Original	David Seidler; The King's Speech	Aaron Sorkin; The Social Network		Christopher Nolan; Inception	David Seidler; The King's Speech	
Best Animated Film	Toy Story 3					
Best Original Score	The Social Network; Trent Reznor and Atticus Ross			—N/a	The King's Speech; Alexandre Desplat	The Social Network; Trent Reznor and Atticus Ross
Best Original Song	"If I Rise"; 127 Hours	"You Haven't Seen the Last of Me"; Burlesque		—N/a		"We Belong Together"; Toy Story 3
Best Foreign Language Film	The Girl with the Dragon Tattoo	In a Better World		—N/a	The Girl with the Dragon Tattoo	In a Better World
Best Documentary	Waiting for "Superman"	—N/a		Waiting for "Superman"	—N/a	Inside Job

Palme d'Or (63rd Cannes Film Festival):

Uncle Boonmee Who Can Recall His Past Lives (ลุงบุญมีระลึกชาติ), directed by Apichatpong Weerasethakul, Thailand

Golden Lion (67th Venice International Film Festival):

Somewhere, directed by Sofia Coppola, United States

Golden Bear (60th Berlin International Film Festival):

Honey (Bal), directed by Semih Kaplanoğlu, Turkey

== 2010 films ==
=== By country/region ===
- List of American films of 2010
- List of Argentine films of 2010
- List of Australian films of 2010
- List of Bangladeshi films of 2010
- List of Brazilian films of 2010
- List of British films of 2010
- List of Canadian films of 2010
- List of Chinese films of 2010
- List of Egyptian films of 2010
- List of French films of 2010
- List of Hong Kong films of 2010
- List of Italian films of 2010
- List of Indian films of 2010
  - List of Assamese films
  - List of Bengali films of 2010
  - List of Hindi films of 2010
  - List of Gujarati films
  - List of Kannada films of 2010
  - List of Malayalam films of 2010
  - List of Marathi films of 2010
  - List of Odia films of 2010
  - List of Punjabi films of 2010
  - List of Tamil films of 2010
  - List of Telugu films of 2010
  - List of Tulu films
- List of Japanese films of 2010
- List of Lebanese films
- List of Mexican films of 2010
- List of Pakistani films of 2010
- List of Swedish films of the 2000s
- List of South Korean films of 2010
- List of Spanish films of 2010
- List of Turkish films of 2010

=== By genre/medium ===
- List of action films of 2010
- List of animated feature films of 2010
- List of avant-garde films of 2010
- List of comedy films of 2010
- List of drama films of 2010
- List of horror films of 2010
- List of science fiction films of 2010
- List of thriller films of 2010
- List of western films of 2010

== Births ==
- March 10 - Ryan Kiera Armstrong, American actress
- April 7 - Alyla Browne, Australian actress
- May 4 - Brooklynn Prince, American actress and director
- June 25 - Shrinivas Pokale, Indian actor
- July 3 - Olivia Booth-Ford, English actress
- July 7 - Frankie Corio, Scottish actress
- July 12 - Federico Ielapi, Italian actor
- August 1 - Jude Hill, Northern Irish actor
- October 18 - Andrey Andreev, Russian actor
- Unknown - Amie Donald, New Zealand actress and dancer

== Deaths ==
Month	Date	Name	Age	Country	Profession	Notable films
January	4	Donal Donnelly	78	Ireland	Actor	The Godfather: Part III; Waterloo
January	8	Piero De Bernardi	83	Italy	Screenwriter	Once Upon a Time in America; Alfredo, Alfredo
January	11	Éric Rohmer	89	France	Director	La Collectionneuse; My Night at Maud's
January	14	Mark Jones	70	UK	Actor	Under Milk Wood; The Empire Strikes Back
January	17	Erich Segal	72	US	Screenwriter	Love Story; Yellow Submarine
January	21	L.A. Johnson	62	US	Producer, Sound Engineer	CSNY/Déjà Vu; Woodstock
January	22	James Mitchell	82	US	Actor	Colorado Territory; The Band Wagon
January	22	Johnny Seven	83	US	Actor	The Apartment; The Love God?
January	22	Jean Simmons	80	UK	Actress	Spartacus; Elmer Gantry
January	24	Pernell Roberts	81	US	Actor	The Magic of Lassie; Ride Lonesome
January	26	Anne Froelick	96	US	Screenwriter	Harriet Craig; Easy Come, Easy Go
January	27	Betty Lou Keim	71	US	Actress	These Wilder Years; Some Came Running
January	27	Zelda Rubinstein	76	US	Actress	Poltergeist; Sixteen Candles
January	31	Giulio Petroni	92	Italy	Director	Death Rides a Horse; Tepepa
February	1	David Brown	93	US	Producer	Jaws; The Sting
February	1	Justin Mentell	27	US	Actor	G-Force; Palo Alto
February	3	John McCallum	91	Australia	Producer, Actor, Screenwriter	The Magic Box; It Always Rains on Sunday
February	3	Frances Reid	95	US	Actress	The Andromeda Strain; The Wrong Man
February	3	Georges Wilson	88	France	Actor	Les Hussards; The Long Absence
February	5	Ian Carmichael	89	UK	Actor	I'm All Right Jack; Private's Progress
February	13	Max Faulkner	78-79	UK	Stuntman, Actor	Willow; Nightbreed
February	13	Gareth Wigan	78	UK	Producer, Executive	American Flyers; Running Scared
February	16	John Davis Chandler	75	US	Actor	The Outlaw Josey Wales; Adventures in Babysitting
February	17	Kathryn Grayson	88	US	Actress	Show Boat; Anchors Aweigh
February	19	Lionel Jeffries	83	UK	Actor, Director	Camelot; The Wrong Arm of the Law
February	22	Robin Davies	56	UK	Actor	Shakespeare in Love; The Blood on Satan's Claw
February	23	Derek Vanlint	77	Canada	Cinematographer	Alien; Dragonslayer
February	26	Richard Devon	84	US	Actor	Magnum Force; The Seventh Sign
February	28	Martin Benson	91	UK	Actor	The Omen; Cleopatra
March	4	Nan Martin	82	US	Actress	Goodbye, Columbus; The Other Side of the Mountain
March	5	Charles B. Pierce	71	US	Director, Screenwriter	Sudden Impact; The Legend of Boggy Creek
March	6	Carol Marsh	83	UK	Actress	Brighton Rock; Helter Skelter
March	8	Tony Imi	72	UK	Cinematographer	Enemy Mine; Night Crossing
March	10	Corey Haim	38	Canada	Actor	License to Drive; The Lost Boys
March	11	Don Guidice	77	US	Film Editor	Three Days of the Condor; The Yakuza
March	11	Merlin Olsen	69	US	Actor	The Undefeated; Mitchell
March	14	Peter Graves	83	US	Actor	Airplane!; Stalag 17
March	15	David J. Steinberg	45	US	Actor	Willow; Epic Movie
March	18	Fess Parker	85	US	Actor	Old Yeller; The Great Locomotive Chase
March	24	Robert Culp	79	US	Actor	Sunday in New York; Bob & Carol & Ted & Alice
March	28	June Havoc	97	US	Actress	Gentleman's Agreement; Hello, Frisco, Hello
March	30	Mario Garbuglia	82	Italy	Production Designer	Barbarella; Waterloo
March	31	Shirley Mills	83	US	Actress	Child Bride; The Under-Pup
April	1	John Forsythe	92	US	Actor	In Cold Blood; The Trouble with Harry
April	4	Lori Martin	62	US	Actress	Cape Fear; The Chase
April	6	Sam Menning	85	US	Actor	The Prestige; The Butcher's Wife
April	6	Corin Redgrave	70	UK	Actor	In the Name of the Father; Four Weddings and a Funeral
April	8	James Aubrey	62	Austria	Actor	Lord of the Flies; Spy Game
April	8	Christopher Cazenove	65	UK	Actor	Three Men and a Little Lady; Zulu Dawn
April	10	Dixie Carter	70	US	Actress	That Evening Sun; Going Berserk
April	16	Sid Conrad	86	US	Actor	The Glimmer Man; Caddyshack II
April	17	Dede Allen	86	US	Film Editor	Dog Day Afternoon; Bonnie and Clyde
April	18	Michael Adams	60	US	Stuntman, Actor	Commando; Under Siege
April	23	Shay Duffin	79	Ireland	Actor	Seabiscuit; The Departed
April	25	Dorothy Provine	75	US	Actress	It's a Mad, Mad, Mad, Mad World; That Darn Cat!
April	28	Furio Scarpelli	90	Italy	Screenwriter	The Good, the Bad and the Ugly; Il postino
May	1	Danny Aiello III	53	US	Stuntman	Eternal Sunshine of the Spotless Mind; Catch Me If You Can
May	2	Lynn Redgrave	67	UK	Actress	Georgy Girl; Gods and Monsters
May	7	Adele Mara	87	US	Actress	You Were Never Lovelier; Sands of Iwo Jima
May	9	Lena Horne	92	US	Actress, Singer	The Wiz; Cabin in the Sky
May	11	Doris Eaton	106	US	Actress	Tell Your Children; The Very Idea
May	26	Art Linkletter	97	Canada	Actor	Champagne for Caesar; People Are Funny
May	28	Eddie Barth	78	US	Actor	Fame; The Amityville Horror
May	28	Gary Coleman	42	US	Actor	On the Right Track; Jimmy the Kid
May	29	Dennis Hopper	74	US	Actor, Director, Screenwriter	Easy Rider; Speed
May	30	Joan Rhodes	90	UK	Actress, Stuntwoman	The Elephant Man; The Pink Panther Strikes Again
May	31	William A. Fraker	86	US	Cinematographer, Director	Bullitt; Rosemary's Baby
June	1	George Martin	80	US	Actor	Dead Poets Society; One Fine Day
June	1	Joseph Strick	86	US	Director, Screenwriter, Producer	Ulysses; Interviews with My Lai Veterans
June	3	Rue McClanahan	76	US	Actress	They Might Be Giants; Out to Sea
June	5	Steven Reuther	58	US	Producer	Pretty Woman; Face/Off
June	6	Robert B. Radnitz	85	US	Producer	My Side of the Mountain; Sounder
June	7	Eric Mason	83	UK	Actor	North Sea Hijack; The Calcium Kid
June	8	Andreas Voutsinas	79	Sudan	Actor	The Producers; The Twelve Chairs
June	13	Jimmy Dean	81	US	Singer, Actor	Diamonds Are Forever; Big Bad John
June	15	Bekim Fehmiu	74	Yugoslavia	Actor	The Adventurers; Black Sunday
June	16	Ronald Neame	99	UK	Director, Cinematographer	Scrooge; The Poseidon Adventure
June	17	Elżbieta Czyżewska	72	Poland	Actress	The Saragossa Manuscript; Music Box
June	19	Vince O'Brien	90	US	Actor	Annie Hall; Quiz Show
June	19	Ursula Thiess	86	Germany	Actress	The Americano; Monsoon
June	22	Tracy Wright	50	Canada	Actress	Monkey Warfare; Superstar
June	23	Allyn Ferguson	85	US	Composer	Back to the Secret Garden; Little Lord Fauntleroy
June	23	Frank Giering	38	Germany	Actor	Funny Games; Baader
June	27	Corey Allen	75	US	Actor, Director	Rebel Without a Cause; Sweet Bird of Youth
June	27	Aldo Giuffrè	86	Italy	Actor	The Good, the Bad and the Ugly; Yesterday, Today and Tomorrow
June	30	Elliott Kastner	80	US	Producer	Where Eagles Dare; The Long Goodbye
July	1	Geoffrey Hutchings	71	UK	Actor	You Will Meet a Tall Dark Stranger; Henry V
July	1	Ilene Woods	81	US	Actress, Singer	Cinderella; On Stage Everybody
July	2	Laurent Terzieff	75	France	Actor	The Milky Way; Kapò
July	8	David Blewitt	81	US	Film Editor	Ghostbusters; That's Entertainment!
July	9	Vonetta McGee	65	US	Actress	Blacula; The Eiger Sanction
July	10	Aldo Sambrell	79	Spain	Actor	For a Few Dollars More; 100 Rifles
July	12	Luigi Scattini	83	Italy	Director	War Italian Style; Primitive Love
July	13	Alan Hume	85	UK	Cinematographer	Return of the Jedi; A Fish Called Wanda
July	15	Kip King	72	US	Actor	A Night at the Roxbury; Westworld
July	16	James Gammon	70	US	Actor	Urban Cowboy; Major League
July	26	Antonio Gamero	76	Spain	Actor	Poachers; The Enchanted Forest
July	27	Maury Chaykin	61	US	Actor	Entrapment; Cutthroat Island
July	31	Suso Cecchi d'Amico	96	Italy	Screenwriter	Casanova 70; The Leopard
July	31	Tom Mankiewicz	69	US	Screenwriter, Director	Diamonds Are Forever; Superman
August	1	Robert F. Boyle	100	US	Art Director, Production Designer	Saboteur; North by Northwest
August	7	Bruno Cremer	75	France	Actor	Is Paris Burning?; Sorcerer
August	8	Patricia Neal	84	US	Actress	The Fountainhead; Hud
August	9	George DiCenzo	70	US	Actor	Back to the Future; Close Encounters of the Third Kind
August	10	David L. Wolper	82	US	Documentarian, Producer	The Race for Space; L.A. Confidential
August	11	Bruno Schleinstein	78	Germany	Actor	The Enigma of Kaspar Hauser; Stroszek
August	14	Abbey Lincoln	80	US	Actress, Singer	For Love of Ivy; Nothing But a Man
August	20	Tiberio Murgia	81	Italy	Actor	Big Deal on Madonna Street; Three Nights of Love
August	24	Satoshi Kon	46	Japan	Director	Perfect Blue; Millennium Actress
August	29	James Deuter	71	US	Actor	Payback; The Hudsucker Proxy
August	30	Alain Corneau	67	France	Director, Screenwriter	Tous les Matins du Monde; Le cousin
September	1	Cammie King	76	US	Actress	Gone with the Wind; Bambi
September	2	Michael Dennison	58	US	Costume Designer	The Chronicles of Riddick; Eat Pray Love
September	3	Robert Schimmel	60	US	Actor, Comedian	Blankman; A Low Down Dirty Shame
September	7	Clive Donner	84	UK	Director, Film Editor	What's New Pussycat?; Nothing But the Best
September	7	Glenn Shadix	58	US	Actor	Beetlejuice; Planet of the Apes
September	9	Geoffrey Foot	95	UK	Film Editor	The Legend of Hell House; The Watcher in the Woods
September	11	Harold Gould	86	US	Actor	The Sting; Patch Adams
September	11	Kevin McCarthy	96	US	Actor	Invasion of the Body Snatchers; UHF
September	12	Claude Chabrol	80	France	Director	Madame Bovary; Story of Women
September	14	Caterina Boratto	95	Italy	Actress	Juliet of the Spirits; The Peddler and the Lady
September	14	Nicholas Selby	85	UK	Actor	The Madness of King George; Macbeth
September	15	Frank Jarvis	69	UK	Actor	The Italian Job; A Bridge Too Far
September	19	Irving Ravetch	89	US	Screenwriter	The Long, Hot Summer; Norma Rae
September	21	Grace Bradley	97	US	Actress	Anything Goes; F-Man
September	21	John Crawford	90	US	Actor	Night Moves; The Enforcer
September	22	Jackie Burroughs	71	Canada	Actress	The Grey Fox; A Winter Tan
September	22	Eddie Fisher	82	US	Actor, Singer	Bundle of Joy; BUtterfield 8
September	22	Bridget O'Connor	49	UK	Screenwriter	Tinker Tailor Soldier Spy; Sixty Six
September	26	Gloria Stuart	100	US	Actress	Titanic; The Invisible Man
September	27	Pierre Guffroy	84	France	Production Designer	Tess; Is Paris Burning?
September	28	Sally Menke	56	US	Film Editor	Pulp Fiction; Kill Bill
September	28	Arthur Penn	88	US	Director, Producer	Bonnie and Clyde; The Miracle Worker
September	29	Andy Albeck	89	US	Studio Executive	
September	29	Tony Curtis	85	US	Actor	Sweet Smell of Success; Some Like It Hot
September	29	Joe Mantell	94	US	Actor	Marty; Chinatown
September	30	Stephen J. Cannell	69	US	Actor, Producer	Posse; Half Past Dead
October	1	Marshall Flaum	85	US	Documentarian	The Yanks Are Coming; Let My People Go: The Story of Israel
October	4	Norman Wisdom	95	UK	Actor, Comedian	Trouble in Store; The Square Peg
October	5	Roy Ward Baker	93	UK	Director	A Night to Remember; Quatermass and the Pit
October	10	John Graysmark	75	UK	Production Designer	Robin Hood: Prince of Thieves; Courage Under Fire
October	12	Angelo Infanti	71	Italy	Actor	The Godfather; Letters to Juliet
October	14	Simon MacCorkindale	58	UK	Actor	Death on the Nile; The Riddle of the Sands
October	14	James Mitchell	80	US	Film Editor	2010: The Year We Make Contact; Capricorn One
October	15	Dorothy Ford	88	US	Actress	3 Godfathers; Love Laughs at Andy Hardy
October	15	Johnny Sheffield	79	US	Actor	Tarzan Finds a Son!; Bomba, the Jungle Boy
October	16	Barbara Billingsley	94	US	Actress	The Bad and the Beautiful; Airplane!
October	16	Chao-Li Chi	83	China	Actor	Big Trouble in Little China; Wedding Crashers
October	19	Tom Bosley	83	US	Actor	Love with the Proper Stranger; The World of Henry Orient
October	19	Graham Crowden	87	UK	Actor	Out of Africa; For Your Eyes Only
October	20	Robert Paynter	82	UK	Cinematographer	Trading Places; Superman II
October	24	Lamont Johnson	88	US	Director	The Last American Hero; One on One
October	25	Lisa Blount	53	US	Actress, Producer	An Officer and a Gentleman; The Accountant
October	28	Robert Ellenstein	87	US	Actor	North by Northwest; Star Trek IV: The Voyage Home
October	28	James MacArthur	72	US	Actor	The Young Stranger; Swiss Family Robinson
October	29	Mervyn Haisman	82	UK	Screenwriter	Curse of the Crimson Altar; Jane and the Lost City
October	29	George Hickenlooper	47	US	Director, Producer	Casino Jack; Hearts of Darkness: A Filmmaker's Apocalypse
November	1	Monica Johnson	64	US	Screenwriter	Modern Romance; Lost in America
November	4	Michelle Nicastro	50	US	Singer, Actress	The Swan Princess; When Harry Met Sally...
November	5	Jill Clayburgh	66	US	Actress	An Unmarried Woman; Silver Streak
November	8	Addison Powell	89	US	Actor	Three Days of the Condor; The Thomas Crown Affair
November	10	Dino De Laurentiis	91	Italy	Producer	Bitter Rice; La Strada
November	11	Marie Osborne	99	US	Costumer, Actress	The Godfather Part II; Around the World in 80 Days
November	11	Simone Valère	87	France	Actress	Beauty and the Devil; The Assassination of Trotsky
November	13	Luis García Berlanga	89	Spain	Director	Welcome Mr. Marshall!; The Executioners
November	13	Simon Holland	70	UK	Production Designer	The Emerald Forest; Nuns on the Run
November	15	Moira Deady	88	Ireland	Actress	This Is My Father; Angela's Ashes
November	20	Heinz Weiss	89	Germany	Actor	The Great Escape; Tread Softly
November	23	Joyce Howard	88	UK	Actress	They Met in the Dark; The Night Has Eyes
November	23	Ingrid Pitt	73	Poland	Actress	The Vampire Lovers; Where Eagles Dare
November	27	Irvin Kershner	87	US	Director	The Empire Strikes Back; RoboCop 2
November	28	Giorgos Fountas	86	Greece	Actor	Stella; Never on Sunday
November	28	Leslie Nielsen	84	Canada	Actor	The Naked Gun; Forbidden Planet
November	28	Gene Polito	92	US	Cinematographer	Westworld; Up in Smoke
November	29	Kamala Devi	77	India	Actress	Geronimo; The Brass Bottle
November	29	Mario Monicelli	95	Italy	Director, Screenwriter	Big Deal on Madonna Street; The Great War
November	30	Ted Sorel	74	US	Actor	Network; Lenny
December	4	Neva Patterson	90	US	Actress	An Affair to Remember; Desk Set
December	15	Blake Edwards	88	US	Director, Screenwriter	The Pink Panther; Breakfast at Tiffany's
December	15	Jean Rollin	72	France	Director, Producer	Le Viol du Vampire; Les Raisins de la Mort
December	17	Lina Romay	91	Spain	Singer, Actress	Bathing Beauty; Honeymoon
December	20	Steve Landesberg	74	US	Actor	Forgetting Sarah Marshall; Wild Hogs
December	27	Grant McCune	67	US	Visual Effects Artist	Star Wars; Ghostbusters II
December	29	Bill Erwin	96	US	Actor	Home Alone; Planes, Trains and Automobiles

== Film debuts ==
- Shamier Anderson – Nostrum
- Audrey Bastien – Lights Out
- Mike Birbiglia – Going the Distance
- Karan Brar – Diary of a Wimpy Kid
- Israel Broussard – Flipped
- Caitlin Carmichael – Backlight
- Anna Castillo − Blog
- Eugene Cordero – When in Rome
- Rana Daggubati – Leader
- Dane DeHaan – Amigo
- Andrea Duro − Three Steps Above Heaven
- Philip Ettinger – Twelve
- Luke Evans – Sex & Drugs & Rock & Roll
- Elsie Fisher – Dirty Girl
- Ruby O. Fee – Womb
- Aura Garrido − Plans for Tomorrow
- Greer Grammer – Almost Kings
- Meredith Hagner – Going the Distance
- Paul Walter Hauser – Virginia
- James Landry Hébert – Skateland
- Lisa Henni – Easy Money
- Cody Horn – Twelve
- Stephanie Hsu – The Four-Faced Liar
- Tom Hughes – Sex & Drugs & Rock & Roll
- Oliver Jackson-Cohen – Going the Distance
- Theo James – You Will Meet a Tall Dark Stranger
- Avan Jogia – Triple Dog
- Jet Jurgensmeyer – Redemption Road
- Shraddha Kapoor – Teen Patti
- Riley Keough – The Runaways
- Vanessa Kirby – Love/Loss
- Ariane Labed – Attenberg
- Jacob Latimore – Vanishing on 7th Street
- Callan McAuliffe – Flipped
- Merrick McCartha – KingBreaker
- Roland Møller – R
- Natalie Morales – Wall Street: Money Never Sleeps
- Kumail Nanjiani – Life as We Know It
- Chris Pang – Tomorrow, When the War Began
- Jordan Peele – Little Fockers
- Ella Purnell – Never Let Me Go
- Andrew Rannells – Sex and the City 2
- Craig Roberts – Submarine
- Laura Ashley Samuels – The Final
- Saxon Sharbino – Red White & Blue
- Timothy Simons – Days Together
- Hailee Steinfeld – True Grit
- Tika Sumpter – Stomp the Yard: Homecoming
- Teyana Taylor – Stomp the Yard: Homecoming
- Miles Teller – Rabbit Hole
- Brenton Thwaites – Charge Over You
- Phoebe Tonkin – Tomorrow, When the War Began
- Jessie T. Usher – Beautiful Boy
- Alicia Vikander – Pure
