= Institute of Criminology =

The Institute of Criminology may refer to:

- Australian Institute of Criminology
- Cambridge Institute of Criminology, University of Cambridge
- Paris Institute of Criminology
- Institute of Criminology and Criminal Justice, Carleton University, Canada
