= Bernard de Nonancourt =

Bernard de Nonancourt (January 15, 1920 – October 29, 2010) was a French businessman, member of the French Resistance and president of the Laurent-Perrier champagne house for more than fifty years. Under de Nonancourt' s leadership, Laurent-Perrier expanded to become the world's third largest seller of champagne by 2005. He was known as "Le Grand Bernard" within the industry.

De Nonancourt's mother, Marie-Louise Lanson de Nonancourt, purchased the Tours-sur-Marne-based champagne maker that would become Laurent-Perrier in 1938. His older brother, Maurice de Nonancourt, was originally intended to inherit the company from his mother, but he would die in a German concentration camp during World War II.

Bernard de Nonancourt and his older brother, Maurice, both joined the French Resistance following the German invasion of France. In 1945, Sergeant de Nonancourt and his forces reached Adolf Hitler's private wine cellar located at Kehlsteinhaus in Bavaria. De Nonancourt blew off the steel doors leading to the cellar, uncovering approximately 500,000 bottles, including hundreds of cases of 1928 Champagne Salon, which had been stolen by German soldiers in 1940. De Nonancourt, who served in the 2nd Armoured Division under General Philippe Leclerc de Hauteclocque, was awarded the Croix de Guerre for his service.

De Nonancourt embarked on a series of apprenticeships and studies after the war in preparation to head the champagne house. He first studied at the École supérieure de commerce de Reims. He then trained at several prominent French champagne houses, including Lanson, which had been acquired by the Nonancourt family at the time. Bernard de Nonancourt assumed control of Laurent-Perrier on October 1, 1948, following his four-year apprenticeship.

He remained the head of Laurent-Perrier for more than fifty years. He developed a reputation as an innovator while introducing new products to the Laurent-Perrier product lines. In 1953, de Nonancourt conceived the idea of a new cuvée called, which was introduced in 1960 as Grand Siècle. De Nonancourt also oversaw the launch of Laurent-Perrier Brut Rosé in 1968. The introduction of the Brut Rosé pink champagne in specially shaped bottles proved to be hit with consumers and a financial success for Laurent-Perrier.

The Laurent-Perrier house prospered under Bernard de Nonancourt, becoming one of the largest champagne producers in the world. Sales of Laurent-Perrier Group champagne increased one "hundredfold" between 1950 and 2000. During de Nonancourt's tenure, Laurent-Perrier rose from the one hundredth largest champagne producer to the world's third largest champagne house by 2005. De Nonancourt retired in 2005, assuming the role of honorary chairman and member of supervisory board within Laurent-Perrier.

He died on the evening of October 29, 2010, at the age of 90. De Nonancourt was survived by his wife, Claude Merand, and four children. His funeral was held at the Saint Remi Basilica in Reims, France, on November 5, 2010.

His two daughters, Alexandra who joined the house in 1987, and Stéphanie, who joined in 1995, were members of the Laurent-Perrier Management board of directors at the time of their father's death. They will become the heads of Laurent-Perrier.
