= Donald A. Andrews =

Canadian correctional psychologist and criminologist (1941-2010)

- Born: Donald Arthur Andrews; June 13, 1941
- Died: October 22, 2010 (aged 69); Ottawa, Ontario
- Education: Carleton University; Queen's University
- Known for: Risk-need-responsivity model
- Scientific career
- Fields: Correctional psychology Criminology
- Workplaces: Carleton University
- Thesis: Aversive treatment procedures in the modification of smoking (1969)

Donald Arthur Andrews (June 13, 1941 – October 22, 2010) was a Canadian correctional psychologist and criminologist who taught at Carleton University, where he was a founding member of the Institute of Criminology and Criminal Justice. He is recognized for having criticized Robert Martinson's influential paper concluding that "nothing works" in correctional treatment. He also helped to advance the technique of risk assessment to better predict the chance of recidivism among offenders. He is credited with coining the terms "criminogenic needs" and "risk-need-responsivity", both of which have since been used and studied extensively in the criminological literature.

== Selected publications ==
- Andrews, D. A.; Bonta, James (26 May 2010). The Psychology of Criminal Conduct. Routledge. ISBN 9781437778984.
- Andrews, D. A.; Zinger, Ivan; Hoge, Robert D.; Bonta, James; Gendreau, Paul; Cullen, Francis T. (1990). "Does Correctional Treatment Work? A Clinically Relevant and Psychologically Informed Meta-Analysis *". Criminology. 28 (3): 369–404. doi:10.1111/j.1745-9125.1990.tb01330.x. ISSN 1745-9125.
- ANDREWS, D. A.; BONTA, JAMES; HOGE, R. D. (March 1990). "Classification for Effective Rehabilitation". Criminal Justice and Behavior. 17 (1): 19–52. doi:10.1177/0093854890017001004. ISSN 0093-8548. S2CID 58523484.
- Andrews, D. A.; Bonta, James; Wormith, J. Stephen (January 2006). "The Recent Past and Near Future of Risk and/or Need Assessment". Crime & Delinquency. 52 (1): 7–27. doi:10.1177/0011128705281756. ISSN 0011-1287. S2CID 145266397.
- Hsu, Ching-I; Caputi, Peter; Byrne, Mitchell K. (25 March 2011). "The Level of Service Inventory-Revised (Lsi-R) and Australian Offenders". Criminal Justice and Behavior. 38 (6): 600–618. doi:10.1177/0093854811402583. ISSN 0093-8548. S2CID 146349050.
- Andrews, D. A.; Bonta, James (2010). "Rehabilitating criminal justice policy and practice". Psychology, Public Policy, and Law. 16 (1): 39–55. doi:10.1037/a0018362. ISSN 1939-1528.
- Canada, Public Safety (21 December 2018). "Risk-need-responsivity model for offender assessment and rehabilitation 2007-06". www.publicsafety.gc.ca.
- Dowden, Craig; Andrews, D. A. (April 2004). "The Importance of Staff Practice in Delivering Effective Correctional Treatment: A Meta-Analytic Review of Core Correctional Practice". International Journal of Offender Therapy and Comparative Criminology. 48 (2): 203–214. doi:10.1177/0306624x03257765. ISSN 0306-624X. PMID 15070467. S2CID 41836.
