= Bantle =

Bantle is a surname. Notable people with the surname include:

- Ernst Bantle (1901–1978), a German football player
- Louis F. Bantle (1928–2010), an American businessman
- Nadezhda Bantle (1851–1934), a Belarusian physician
