= The Yanks Are Coming =

The Yanks Are Coming may refer to:

- "The Yanks Are Coming", key phrase from 1917 American wartime patriotic song "Over There"
- The Yanks Are Coming (1942 film), American World War II musical comedy
- The Yanks Are Coming (1963 film), American World War I 45-minute feature documentary
- "The Yanks Are Coming", April 22, 1974 episode of David L. Wolper Productions documentary TV series American Heritage
