= Laurent-Perrier =

French champagne producer

Coordinates: 49.0012209°N 4.1615038°E

- Company type: Société Anonyme
- Traded as: Euronext: LPE; CAC All-Share
- Industry: Winery
- Genre: French winery
- Founded: 1812; 214 years ago
- Founder: Alphonse Pierlot
- Headquarters: Domaine Laurent-Perrier; 51150 Tours-sur-Marne; France
- Area served: Worldwide
- Products: French wine
- Revenue: €197.8 million (2010)
- Operating income: €32.7 million (2010)
- Net income: €14.8 million (2010)
- Number of employees: 446 (2010)
- Website: laurent-perrier.com

Laurent-Perrier
- Wine region: Tours-sur-Marne
- Varietals: Chardonnay, Pinot noir, Pinot Meunier

Laurent-Perrier (pronounced [lɔ.ʁɑ̃ pɛ.ʁje]) is a Champagne house founded in 1812. It is the main company of the Laurent-Perrier Group, whose other flagship brands include the houses of Salon, De Castellane and Delamotte. Laurent-Perrier Group also acquired Chateau Malakoff as of 2004. With over 1,200 grape growers with supply contracts, Laurent-Perrier exports to more than 120 countries.

Laurent-Perrier rose to become the world's third best selling champagne brand as of 2005, behind Moët et Chandon and Veuve Clicquot.

== History ==
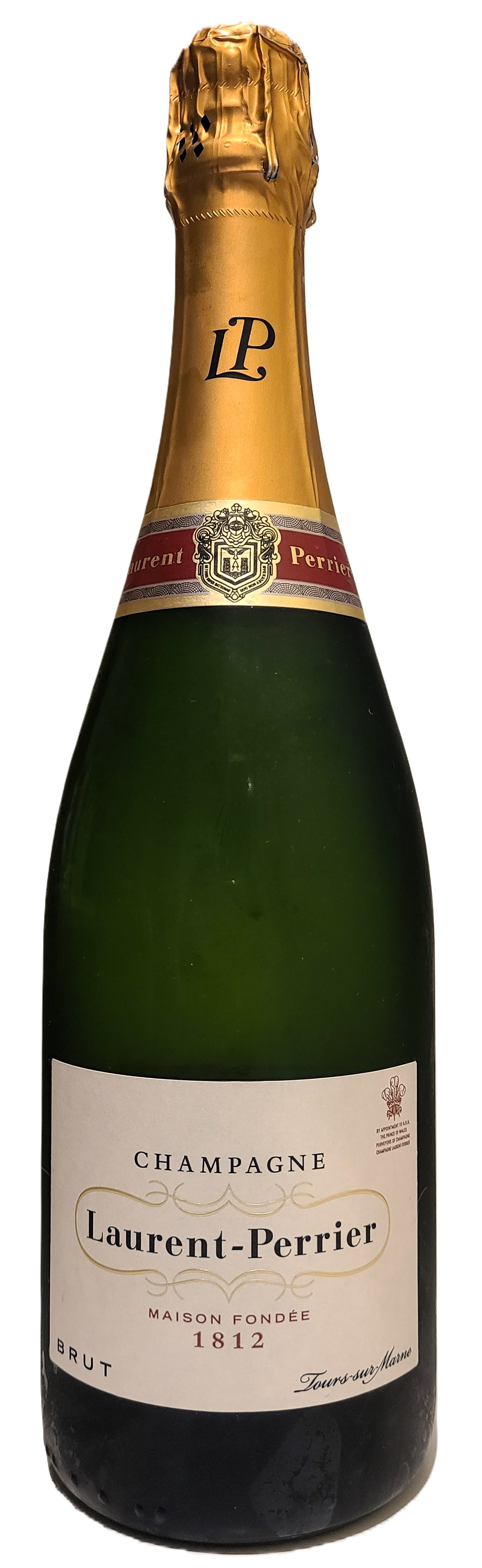
NV Laurent-Perrier Champagne Brut L.P.

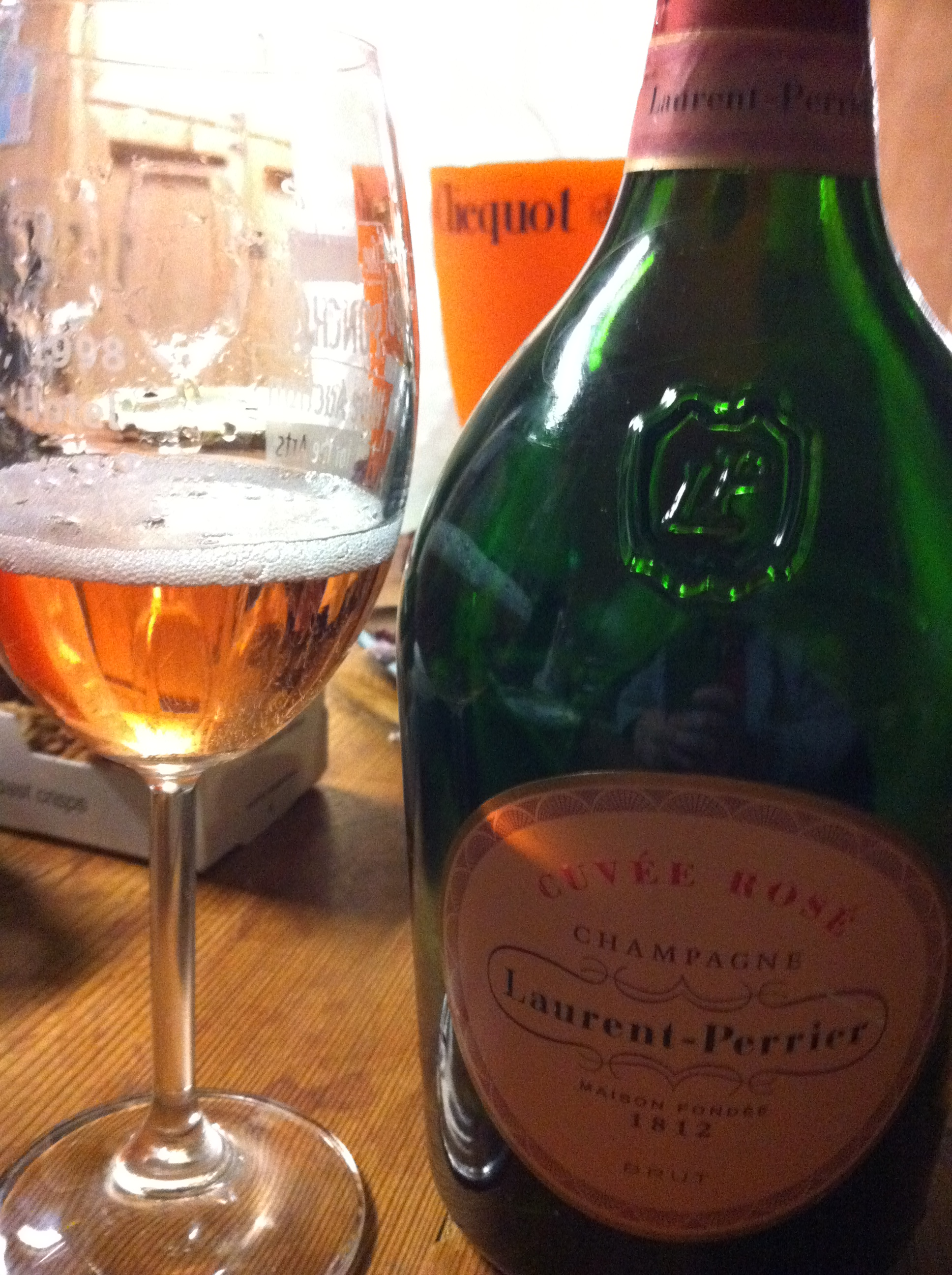
Rosé Champagne from Laurent Perrier

In 1812, a former cooper and bottler, Alphonse Pierlot, purchased two parcels of land named "Plaisances" and "La Tour Glorieux" in Tours-sur-Marne. Pierlot willed his company to his cellar master, Eugene Laurent, who ran it with his wife, Mathilde Emilie Perrier.

After Eugene Laurent died in 1887 his widow, Mathilde, took control and attached her name to the company, changing it to Veuve Laurent-Perrier (veuve means "widow"). Veuve Mathilde led the company to great success, producing 50,000 cases of Champagne. This success was short-lived, due to the outbreak of World War I.

Following the war, Veuve Mathilde hired Alexander Fletcher Keith Mackenzie to introduce and market Laurent-Perrier in the United Kingdom. In 1925 Veuve Mathilde died, leaving the company to Eugenie Hortense Laurent. Due to the setbacks from World War I and the imminent outbreak of World War II, Eugenie sold the company to Mary-Louise Lanson de Nonancourt in 1939. Marie-Louise invested all she could in the company, keeping it afloat through the turmoils of war, at one point mortgaging 1,000 cases of Champagne she had hidden in a wall.

Her eldest son, Maurice, died during the war in the concentration camp at Oranienburg, leaving his younger brother, Bernard de Nonancourt, as the heir apparent. Upon Bernard's return from war, his mother set about educating him on every aspect of Champagne making at the Houses of Lanson and Delamotte.

In 1949, Bernard de Nonancourt became the owner of the company and saw it become one of the largest family-owned Champagne houses. The de Nonancourt family still retains majority ownership of the company.

== Subsidiaries and partnerships ==
Beginning in the late 1970s, Laurent-Perrier established a series of wholly owned subsidiaries, starting in U.K. in 1978, and followed by Switzerland (1992), U.S. (1998), and Belgium (1999).

Relais et Chateau is an international organization which promotes particularly unique hotel and restaurant establishments of which Laurent-Perrier became an official champagne partner in 2001.

In 2003, JEROBOAM Co., Ltd was created after Laurent-Perrier, Hugel and Perrin banded together with several other private French and Japanese partners. JEROBOAM is a fine wine distribution network solely for the marketing of such wines in Japan.

== See also ==
- List of champagne producers
- French wine
