= Cwmllynfell RFC =

Welsh rugby union club, based in Cwmllynfell

(Wales) Cwmllynfell RFC
- Full name: Cwmllynfell Rugby Football Club
- Nickname(s): The Blues, Cwmvegas
- Founded: 1904; 122 years ago
- Location: Cwmllynfell, Wales
- Ground: Bryn Park
- President: Gareth George
- Coach(es): Peter Thomas, Matthew Steinmann, Carl Ackland
- Captain: Chris Balfe
- League: WRU Division Three West Central A

Official website
- cwmllynfell.rfc.wales

Cwmllynfell RFC are a Welsh rugby union club based in Cwmllynfell in South Wales. Cwmllynfell RFC is a member of the Welsh Rugby Union and is a feeder club for the Ospreys.

== Club honours ==
- West Wales Champions: 1958-59,1959–60,1961–62
- WWRU Section B Champions: 1976,1984
- Division Six B Central Champions: 1997–1998
- WRU Division Four West - Champions: 1998–1999
- WRU Division Two West - Champions: 2004–2005
- West Wales (Tovali) Cup - Winners: 2006, 2016

== Notable former players ==
- (Wales) Les Anthony (3 caps)
- (Wales) Howell Lewis (4 caps)
- (Wales) Eddie Williams (2 caps)
- Tudor Williams (1 cap)
