= Champagne Delamotte =

Champagne producer

Champagne Delamotte is a small producer of Champagne. Along with its "sister" winery Champagne Salon, Delamotte is the historical house of the Laurent-Perrier group.

== History ==
Delamotte is a Champagne house more than 260 years old (it is the sixth oldest Champagne house) founded in Reims in 1760 by François Delamotte, a vineyard owner.

Alexandre Delamotte brought the cellars, caves and offices of the House of Delamotte to a mansion at the end of the 18th century. In 1828, his brother, Nicolas Louis Delamotte, assumed management of the House of Delamotte. Nicolas was well known for taking part in the organization of the coronation of Charles X.

The House was sold to the Lanson family in the 1830s, which later started producing a Lanson label. It was eventually acquired by Marie-Louise de Nonancourt, née Lanson, in the period between the two World Wars. In 1927, Marie-Louise made the decision to transfer the activities of the house of Delamottte to Mesnil-sur-Oger. The management of the company was entrusted to the hands of Marie-Louise's youngest son, Charles de Nonancourt.

In 1988, the House of Delamotte joined forces with the still enigmatic Champagne Salon under the umbrella of the parent company, Laurent-Perrier, led by Charles' brother, Bernard. Today, the House of Delamotte and its sister company Champagne Salon are under the direction of Didier Depond in Le Mesnil-sur-Oger.

== Vineyards and production ==
As the second label of Salon, Delamotte produces wines from grapes sourced from the same vineyards in the Côte des Blancs region of Champagne. While Salon exclusively produces vintage Champagne in vintages deemed exceptional, Delamotte reserves wine from year to year to create blended wine in Non-Vintage styles.

== Reputation ==
In his publication The Wine Advocate, critic Robert M. Parker, Jr. has called Delamotte "one of the best buys in exquisitely crafted Champagne." Wine writer Karen MacNeil refers to Delamotte's blanc de blancs as her "desert island" choice and includes the wine among her list of "Champagnes to Know."

== See also ==
- List of Champagne houses
