= Edwin Williams (rugby) =

Wales dual-code rugby international footballer

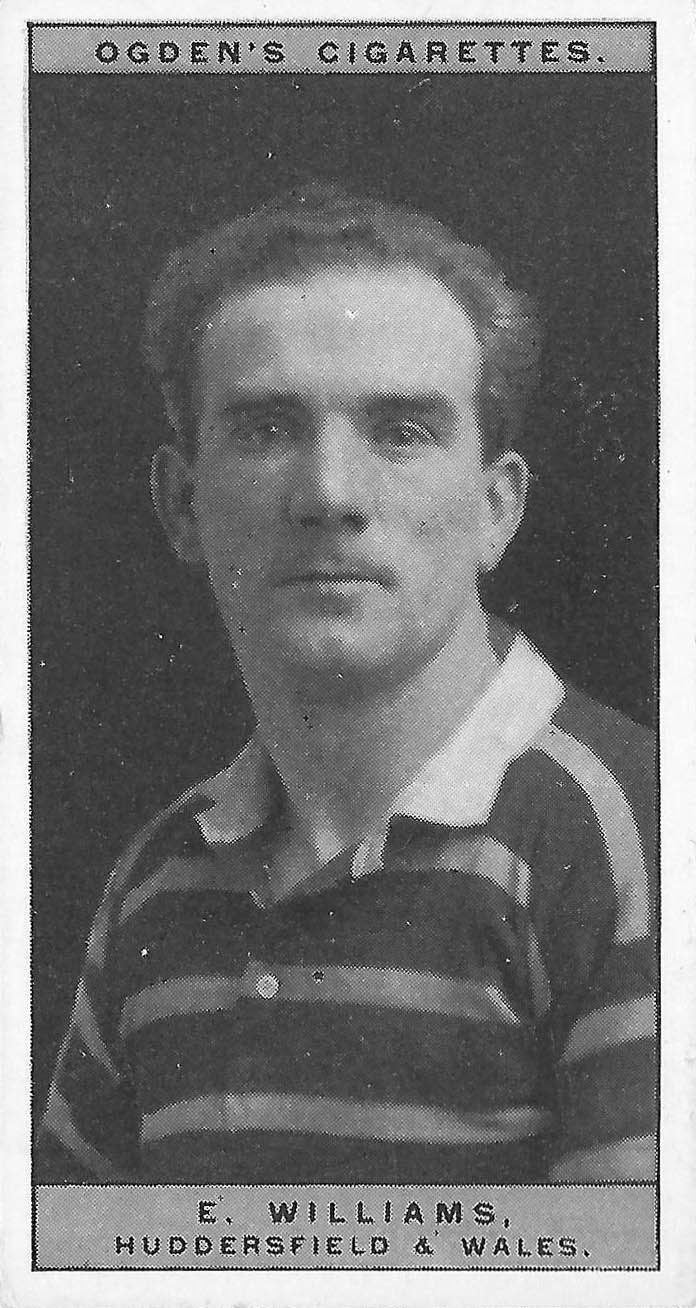

Personal information
- Full name: Edwin Williams
- Born: 1 July 1898 Cwmllynfell, Neath Port Talbot, Wales
- Died: 31 January 1983 (aged 84) Swansea, Wales

Playing information

Rugby union
- Position: Fly-half
Club
| Years | Team | Pld | T | G | FG | P |
|---|---|---|---|---|---|---|
| | Cwmllynfell RFC |
| | Swansea RFC |
| ≤1924–25 | Neath RFC |
| | Total | 0 | 0 | 0 | 0 | 0 |
Representative
| Years | Team | Pld | T | G | FG | P |
| 1924–25 | Wales | 2 | 0 | 0 | 0 | 0 |

Rugby league
- Position: Stand-off
Club
| Years | Team | Pld | T | G | FG | P |
|---|---|---|---|---|---|---|
| 1925–≥28 | Huddersfield |
Representative
| Years | Team | Pld | T | G | FG | P |
| 1928 | Wales | 1 |

Edwin "Eddie" Williams (1 July 1898 – 31 January 1983) was a Welsh dual-code international rugby union, and professional rugby league footballer who played in the 1920s. He played representative–level rugby union (RU) for Wales, and at club level for Swansea RFC and Neath RFC as a fly-half, and representative–level rugby league (RL) for Wales, and at the club level for Huddersfield as a stand-off.

== Background ==
Eddie Williams was born in Cwmllynfell, Wales, and he died aged 84 in Swansea, Wales.

== International honours ==
Eddie Williams won caps for Wales (RU) while at Neath RFC in 1924 against New Zealand, and in 1925 against France, and won a cap for Wales (RL) while at Huddersfield in the 15–39 defeat by England at White City Stadium, Sloper Road, Grangetown, Cardiff on Wednesday 14 November 1928.
