= List of Punjabi films of 2010 =

This is a list of Punjabi films of 2010.

== List of films ==
Title	Director	Cast (Subject of documentary)	Genre	Notes	Release date	Ref.
Mitti	Jatinder Mauhar	Lakhwinder Kandola, Sardar Sohi, Hardeep Cheema, Victor John, Yaad Grewal, Kartar Cheema, Mika Singh	Action	Kamalpreet Singh Bains	8 January	
Sukhmani: Hope for Life		Gurdas Mann, Juhi Chawla, Divya Dutta, Anoop Soni, Bhagwant Mann			12 February	
Jawani Zindabaad	Harinder Gill	Raj Brar, Pooja Kanwal, Guggu Gill, Gurkirtan Chauhan			12 March	
Lad Gaya Pecha	Anmol Arora	Gurpreet Ghuggi, Navneet Kaur	Comedy		26 March	
Ekam: Son of Soil	Mandeep Benipal	Babbu Maan, Mandy Takhar, Mohitinder Bawa, Bhagwant Mann		B S Maan (Khant), Darshan Singh Grewal	23 April	
Virsa	Pankaj Batra	Arya Babbar, Gulshan Grover, Kawaljit Singh, Mehreen Raheal, Naumaan Ijaas	Romance	One world entertainment Wize mindz entertainment	7 May	
Panjaban	Gaurav Trehan	Miss Pooja, Attar Habib, Sudesh Lahri, Harish Verma, Rana Ranbir, Nirmal Rishi			11 June	
Mel Karadeh Rabba		Jimmy Shergill, Gippy Grewal, Neeru Bajwa, Bhotu Shah	Romance, Drama		16 July	
Channa Sachi Muchi	Harinder Gill	Goldie Sumal, Miss Pooja, Rana Ranbir, Aniya Sabdeesh, Sunny Sandhu, Ramnik Sandhu, Jaswant Gill, Rajinder Rosy, D P Arshi, Raj Virk, Maninder Vailey, Jas Dhillon, Shiraz Khan		Iqbal Dhillon	27 August	
Chak Jawana	Simerjeet Singh	Gurdas Mann, Rana Ranbir, Karamjit Anmol, Gaurav Kakkar, Gurkeerat, Jonita Doda		Balli Janjua, Rupinder Chahal	27 August	
Chhevan Dariya - The Sixth River	Ish Amitoj Kaur	Gulshan Grover, Neena Gupta, Lakhvinder Wadali, Manpreet Singh, Navneet Kaur, Christa Cannon, Deep Dhillon, Rana Ranbir, Binnu Dhillon	Drama	Ish Amitoj Kaur	3 September	
Ik Kudi Punjab Di	Manmohan Singh (director)	Amrinder Gill, Jaspinder Cheema, Aman Dhaliwal, Guggu Gill, Gurpreet Ghuggi, Rana Ranbir, Kanwaljeet Singh, Deep Dhillon, Navneet Nishan, Neeta Mahindra, Balwinder Begowal, Tarshinder Soni, Sukhbir Razia, Surinder Sharma	Romance, Drama	Manmohan Singh, Ratan Bhatia	17 September	
Kabaddi Ikk Mohabbat		Gugu Gill, Gurleen Chopra			1 October	
Ilyasa Gujjar	Pervez Rana	Shaan, Nargis		Eid-ul-Azha	17 November	
Tere Ishq Nachaya		Victor John, Gavie Chahal, Mannat Singh (Sukhi Pawaar), Donny Kapoor, Akshita, Jonita Doda, Aarti Puri			26 November	
Simran	Darshan Bagga	Guggu Gill, Simran Randhawa, Surjeet Khan, Sudesh Lahiri			3 December	
Mar Jawan Gur Khake	Aditya Sood	Jimmy Sharma, Gunjan Walia, Gurpreet Ghuggi, Shakti Kapoor, Aman Verma, Sanjay Mishra, Tarun Khanna, Upasna Singh, Rana Jangbahadur, Gopi Bhalla, Deepak Raja, Bobby Darling, Narinder Bedi, Birbal, Mehar Mittal	Comedy	Jagdish Sahota	3 December	
