= Francisco Batistela =

Francisco Batistela C.Ss.R.
- Bishop of Bom Jesus da Lapa
- Church: Catholic Church
- Diocese: Diocese of Bom Jesus da Lapa
- In office: 18 April 1990 – 28 January 2009
- Predecessor: José Nicomedes Grossi
- Successor: José Valmor César Teixeira

Orders
- Ordination: 25 January 1957
- Consecration: 1 July 1990 by Geraldo Maria de Morais Penido

Personal details
- Born: 30 September 1931 Cerquilho, São Paulo, Republic of the United States of Brazil
- Died: 20 October 2010 (aged 79) Guaratinguetá, São Paulo, Brazil

Dom Francisco Batistela (Cerquilho, 30 September 1931 – Guaratinguetá, 20 October 2010) was the Catholic bishop of the Roman Catholic Diocese of Bom Jesus da Lapa, Brazil.
