= Risk-need-responsivity model =

Criminological risk assessment model

The risk-needs-responsivity (RNR) model is used in criminology to develop recommendations for how prisoners should be assessed based on the risk they present, the programs or services they require, and how treatment models should be designed based on styles that can change the behaviors that have been identified as treatment goals and that treatment models should be designed to match the learning styles of the offender to overall reduce recidivism. It was first proposed in 1990 based on the research conducted in the 1960s and 70s by Lee Sechrest, Ted Palmer, and other researchers on classifications of offender treatments. The model was primarily developed by Canadian researchers James Bonta, Donald A. Andrews, and Paul Gendreau. The RNR model has been one of the world's leading models in offender management, but recent research has been reevaluating the effectiveness of the RNR model and if there are additional factors that should be considered when correctional treatment models are designed to reduce rates of reoffending.

== Core principles ==
According to the model, there are three main principles that should guide interventions for helping offenders reduce involvement in crime:

1. Risk principle: Offenders differ in their risk of recidivism, therefore different kinds of interventions are appropriate. Complex (and expensive) interventions may be unreasonable when the risk is low. On the other hand, for high-risk offenders intensive interventions are likely necessary to induce any kind of change
2. Need principle: Every offender naturally has their own dynamic risk factors or criminogenic needs which can be addressed by treatment. When changed, they predict changes in reoffending rates. Therefore, interventions should target these individual needs for the best results. There are 8 criminogenic needs, 7 of which are dynamic:
  1. Criminal History
  2. Anti-social Personality Pattern
  3. Pro-criminal Attitudes
  4. Pro-criminal Associates
  5. Marital/family
  6. Leisure
  7. School/work
  8. Substance Abuse
3. Responsivity principle: Thirdly, different modes of intervention differ in their effectiveness of reducing recidivism. General responsivity states that rehabilitative treatment is most successful when cognitive-social learning methods are applied to influence behavior. Specific responsivity alludes to tailoring treatment to individuals based on factors such as motivation, intelligence, learning style, race, ethnicity, and gender.

== Evidence ==
Early empirical support for the Risk-Need-Responsivity principles came from a meta-analysis conducted by Donald A. Andrews and colleagues. The principles were applied to studies of juvenile and adult correctional treatment (Andrews et. al., 1990). They compared the effects of what they termed "appropriate correctional service," which was consistent with the risk, need, and responsivity principles against unspecified or less appropriate correctional interventions. This involved providing more intensive treatments to higher risk cases, targeting criminogenic needs and using models that are consistent with the client's needs and learning styles. It was found that treatment associated with these psychological principles had a significantly greater effect in reducing recidivism compared with unspecified correctional service, treatments considered inappropriate according to these principles or criminal sanctions without service.

== Limitations ==
Recent reviews have reassessed how strongly each RNR principle is supported. Seena Fazal and colleagues published a paper with 26 meta-analyses that investigated RNR principles, and found that statistical support was not consistent for individual components of the RNR model. For the risk principal, individuals who were classified as high risk who adhered to the treatment programs exhibited a lower risk of recidivism compared to groups receiving low or minimal services. However, the "quality across the eligible reviews was poor" as the measures lacked information on key measures and had "low scores in methodological quality". The need principle assessed recidivism risk according to the eight criminogenic needs according to 6 meta-analyses that were identified by the researchers, although, the quality of reviews was mixed. The studies assessing risk assessment based on the need principle had "moderate to high quality" but the studies that directly examined the need principal were of "low quality". The researchers found some studies that supported that general responsivity and specific responsivity had an impact on reducing recidivism, but the quality of the studies was not consistently high.

Researchers have also investigated the impact recidivism rates in programs that follow the RNR principles compared to those that do not follow the RNR principles strictly. A paper from 2023 found that interventions that follow the RNR principles "achieved similar results to those that did not." They found that the effectiveness of correctional programs aimed at reducing recidivism depended on whether they completed the entire program as "programs are designed to be most effective at full participation." The researchers also stated that grouping by age should be considered as adolescents are more "susceptible to external coercion" but there is also a "strong association between age and delinquency," so correctional programs should be designed after taking these factors into account. Duan et. al also stated that they "did not find that interventions implemented following RNR principles were more effective in reducing rates than non-RNR interventions." They concluded that "RNR principles are not golden" and other factors that have been shown to impact recidivism rates in recent years should be considered as well when designing new intervention programs.
