= Les Anthony =

Wales international rugby union & league footballer

Personal information
- Full name: Leslie Anthony
- Born: 21 November 1921 Rhiwfawr, Wales
- Died: 24 October 2010 (aged 88)

Playing information

Rugby union
- Position: Prop
Club
Years	Team	Pld	T	G	FG	P
≤1945–≤45	Cwmllynfell RFC
≤1945–48	Neath RFC
	Total	0	0	0	0	0
Representative
Years	Team	Pld	T	G	FG	P
1948	Wales	3	0	0	0	0

Rugby league
Club
Years	Team	Pld	T	G	FG	P
1948–54	Oldham	113	10	0	0	30

Leslie "Les" Anthony (21 November 1921 – 24 October 2010) was a Welsh rugby union, and professional rugby league footballer who played in the 1940s and 1950s. He played representative level rugby union (RU) for Wales, and at club level for Cwmllynfell RFC and Neath RFC (captain), as a prop, and club level rugby league (RL) for Oldham.

== Background ==
Les Anthony was born in Rhiwfawr, Wales. he was worked as a collier and sheet metal worker, and he died aged 88. Up to his death, he had been the third oldest living Wales player, behind; Jack Matthews and Handel Greville, and the oldest living Wales forward, in front of; Emlyn Davies.

== Playing career ==
=== International honours ===
Les Anthony won caps for Wales (RU) while at Neath RFC in 1938 against England, Scotland, and France.

=== Notable tour matches ===
Les Anthony played prop, alongside hooker; Cliff Williams and prop; Les Davies, in Neath RFC's 15-22 defeat by the New Zealand Army Touring XV ("The Kiwis") at The Gnoll, Neath during 1945.

=== Club career ===
==== Neath RFC ====
Les Anthony played in Neath RFC's victory in the Welsh Club Championship during the 1946–47 season, captained by Cliff Williams, this was Neath RFC's first post-World War II victory, and their sixth of ten overall.

==== Oldham RLFC ====
He made his début for Oldham on Saturday 28 August 1948, and he played his last match for Oldham during the 1953–54 season.
