= Diocese of Bom Jesus da Lapa =

Catholic ecclesiastical territory

Coordinates: 13.2588°S 43.4223°W

Diocese of Bom Jesus da Lapa Dioecesis Spelaeopolitana a Bono Iesu

Catholic

Location
- Country: Brazil
- Ecclesiastical province: Vitória da Conquista

Statistics
- Area: 562,303 km^{2} (217,106 sq mi)
- Population: Total; Catholics: (as of 2006); 360,000; 287,000 (79.7%)

Information
- Denomination: Catholic Church
- Rite: Latin Rite
- Established: 22 July 1962 (64 years ago)
- Cathedral: Catedral Bom Jesus

Current leadership
- Pope: Leo XIV
- Bishop: Rubival Cabral Britto, O.F.M. Cap.
- Metropolitan Archbishop: Vítor Agnaldo de Menezes

The Roman Catholic Diocese of Bom Jesus da Lapa (Latin: Dioecesis Spelaeopolitana a Bono Iesu) is a diocese located in the city of Bom Jesus da Lapa in the ecclesiastical province of Vitória da Conquista in Brazil.

== History ==
- 22 July 1962: Established as Diocese of Bom Jesus da Lapa from the Diocese of Barra

== Bishops ==
- Bishops of Bom Jesus da Lapa (Latin Rite)
  - José Nicomedes Grossi (1962.08.28 – 1990.03.15), retired
  - Francisco Batistela, C.Ss.R. (1990.04.18 – 2009.01.28), retired
  - José Valmor César Teixeira, S.D.B. (2009.01.28 – 2014.03.20), appointed Bishop of São José dos Campos, São Paulo
  - João Santos Cardoso (2015.06.24 – 2023.07.05), appointed Archbishop of Natal, Rio Grande do Norte
  - Rubival Cabral Britto, O.F.M. Cap. (2024.03.13 – Present)

=== Coadjutor bishop ===
- João Nílton dos Santos Souza (1986-1988), did not succeed to see; appointed Bishop of Amargosa, Bahia
