= João Costa (fencer) =

Portuguese fencer

Personal information
- Born: 21 July 1920 Lisbon, Portugal
- Died: 3 October 2010 (aged 90) Lisbon, Portugal

Sport
- Sport: Fencing

João Costa (21 July 1920 – 3 October 2010) was a Portuguese fencer. He competed in the team épée events at the 1948 and 1952 Summer Olympics.
