= Ish Amitoj Kaur =

Ish Amitoj Kaur is a filmmaker who resides in the U.S. She is best known for her films Chhevan Dariya (The Sixth River) and Kambdi Kalaai(Trembling Wrist). She is also known for her unique theater in therapy techniques that she has evolved while doing theater workshops with children.

== Background ==
Kaur grew up in the foothills of Himalayas in Shimla; she did her schooling from Loreto Convent, Tara Hall, Shimla and later graduated from St. Bede's College, Shimla. She did her master's degree in theater from Panjab University Chandigarh and later went to National School of Drama Repertory company where she was involved in various productions. She later went to become a Fellow of National School of Drama, New Delhi and carried on with her creative journey in creative writing from Stanford.

== Career ==
After doing lead in plays like Bertolt Brecht's Caucasian Chalk Circle she later acted in many productions of National School of Drama. She was later employed as an assistant producer with Tara Punjabi. After having assisted in Urdu sitcoms she worked as an assistant director in the famous Bollywood film, Pinjar. She continued doing theater especially with kids. She worked with Literacy India which encouraged thousands of kids to be a part of theater workshops. These kids later bagged main leads in Bollywood films including Vishal Bhardwaj's The Blue Umbrella and Aamir Khan's Three Idiots. She later assisted in films of Manmohan Singh including Asan Nu Maan Watna Da and Mitti Wajaan Maardi. She also assisted in the film Tera Mera Ki Rishta. Kaur later opened her own production company, Noor Nissan Productions, and pioneered in the direction of films made on the Sikh diaspora she made History by becoming the first-ever woman to write direct and produce a Punjabi Feature Film. Presently, she is working on an untitled book to be made into a Hollywood movie.

== Performances ==
- Grusha Vashnadze-Caucasian Chalk Circle
- Paribhritika- Bhagavadajjukam
- Kaveri-Raaste

== Theater direction ==
Disney's Moana Jr 2022 Disney's Lion King 2021 Wizard of Oz 2020 Peter Rabbit 2020 The Window Cleaner 2018 Betty And Her Feast 2017 Pickled Princess 2016 The Ugly Buckling 2015

- Evanescent Dreams
- Charandas Chor
- Pinti Ka Sabun
- Alibaba Chalis Chor

== Documentaries ==
- Sikhs We Are
- Drop in the Ocean

== Film direction ==
- Chhevan Dariya(The Sixth River)
- Kambdi Kalaai
