= Don Goodsir =

Australian schoolteacher, author and environmentalist

Don Goodsir OAM
- Born: Donald Henry Goodsir; 21 May 1937; Haberfield, New South Wales
- Died: 6 October 2010 (aged 73)
- Education: University of Sydney (B.A.)
- Occupations: Teacher, administrator
- Years active: 1956–2010
- Employer: NSW Department of Education and Training
- Known for: Environmentalism
- Notable work: Gould League books on Australian birds and mammals
- Spouse: Julie (nee Ferguson)
- Children: 3
- Awards: Medal of the Order of Australia

Donald Henry Goodsir OAM (21 May 1937 – 6 October 2010) was an Australian teacher, school administrator, author and environmentalist.

== Early life ==
Goodsir was born in Haberfield, New South Wales on 21 May 1937 to Harry Goodsir (a maintenance engineer) and Molly Moore. He was educated at Haberfield Primary School, Fort Street Boys' High School and William Balmain Teachers' College.

== Career ==
At the age of 18, Goodsir was appointed to a one-room school at Bulby Brush School near Krambach, New South Wales, the same school attended earlier by Australian poet Les Murray.

After three years Goodsir returned to Sydney where he taught while completing an Arts degree at the University of Sydney. After teaching in England for three years, he served as principal at public schools in North Sydney, Lindfield, Maroubra Junction and Mosman. Frustrated that books on birds focussed on North American species, he approached the Gould League and wrote the text for two books, on Australian birds and mammals.

Goodsir went on to become an inspector of schools in Coonabarabran and a director of schools for Woollahra.

== After retirement ==
Following his retirement in 1994, Goodsir undertook many voluntary community roles including:

- President, Headland Preservation Group
- President, Mosman Historical Society
- Member, Friends of the Bradley Bushland Reserve
- Community Advisory Committee Member, Sydney Harbour Federation Trust

Goodsir also served as a volunteer teacher training adviser in Thailand, Kiribati and, while suffering from cancer, the Solomon Islands.

== Honours ==
- Medal of the Order of Australia (OAM) for service to the community, particularly through environmental preservation and heritage organisations (2008)

== Publications ==
- The Gould League book of Australian birds (1979) ISBN 0-85558-632-X
- The Gould League book of Australian mammals (1981) ISBN 0-85558-640-0
- Fascinating Australian birds : a pictorial guide (2007) ISBN 978-1-921221-08-8
