= Frank Bourgholtzer =

American journalist (1919–2010)

Frank Bourgholtzer (October 26, 1919 – October 8, 2010) was an American journalist and television correspondent.

== Career ==
Born in New York City, Bourgholtzer attended Indiana University Bloomington, where he majored in government and minored in economics and journalism. He graduated with a Bachelor of Arts in 1940. Bourgholtzer returned to New York after graduation and wrote comic book scripts until joining the Wall Street Journal as a reporter in 1943. He became a Capitol Hill correspondent for the paper in 1945.

The following year, Bourgholtzer joined NBC News as the TV news service's first full-time White House correspondent. From 1947 until 1953, he covered President Truman. During the first live televised tour of the White House, Bourgholtzer persuaded the president to play on the piano in the East Room.

From the early 1950s through the 1960s, Bourgholtzer worked overseas for NBC News and served as bureau chief in Paris, Bonn, Vienna, Moscow, and Yemen. In 1969 he joined NBC's Los Angeles bureau, where he stayed until retiring in 1986. After retirement, he continued to complete special news assignments, primarily focused on the Soviet Union.

== Awards and recognition ==
In 1965, Bourgholtzer received an Overseas Press Club Award for "best TV reporting from abroad" that recognized his 1964 coverage of the war in Yemen for NBC.

When announcing Bourgholtzer's death in 2010, NBC's Brian Williams called him "a renaissance man, elegant but down to earth, an exceptional reporter."

== Death ==
Bourgholtzer died at home in Santa Monica, California at age 90 on October 8, 2010.
