= Kristin Johannsen =

American author (1957–2010)

Kristin Lisa Johannsen (Tomah, Wisconsin, October 15, 1957 – October 7, 2010), was an American author and educator.

== Background ==
Born in Tomah, Wisconsin to Marilyn and Walter Johannsen, Kristin had one sister, Karen (now Karen Johannsen-Talsky). Johannsen earned her bachelor's degree from the University of Wisconsin-Madison in 1978, traveled throughout Europe and returned to Madison to earn a master's degree in English nearly a decade later. After living in Europe, the Middle East, and East Asia for twenty years, she made her home on VanWinkle Grove, in Berea, Kentucky with her husband Kevin Barbour Millham. She published three books, as well as numerous travel articles, magazine articles and internationally used textbooks.

== Writings ==
With Al Fritsch, Johannsen was co-author of Ecotourism in Appalachia: Marketing the Mountains, which won the 2004 Caudill Prize. The Caudill award is made by Bookworm and Silverfish in Rural Retreat, Virginia to recognize outstanding investigative writing about Appalachian issues similar to Harry Caudill's Night Comes to the Cumberlands.

Her numerous travel articles appeared in both national and international newspapers, including the Los Angeles Times, Chicago Tribune, Dallas Morning News, San Francisco Chronicle, Denver Post, The Independent (London), Japan Times (Tokyo), South China Morning Post (Hong Kong), and New Zealand Herald (Auckland).

Magazines such as Mother Jones, Voyageur, Blue Ridge Country, Kentucky Living, Texas Highways, New Mexico Journey, Nevada Magazine, Tokyo Journal, Traveller (London), Gulf Weekly (Dubai), Morning Calm (Seoul), Caribbean Beat (Trinidad), and Golden Falcon (Bahrain) published her stories. Nearly 30 of her textbooks for English as a Foreign Language classes are still marketed in Latin America, Asia, and the Middle East.

She died October 7, 2010, at the Compassionate Care Center in Richmond, Kentucky.
