= José Nicomedes Grossi =

Catholic bishop (1915–2009)

- Bishop of Diocese of Bom Jesus da Lapa (emeritus)
- Church: Roman Catholic Church
- See: Diocese of Bom Jesus da Lapa
- In office: 1962 - 1990
- Predecessor: None
- Successor: Francisco Batistela
- Previous post(s): Priest

Orders
- Ordination: September 21, 1940

Personal details
- Born: 15 September 1915; Cipotânea, Brazil
- Died: 21 June 2009 (aged 93); Juiz de Fora, Brazil

José Nicomedes Grossi (15 September 1915 – 21 June 2009) was a Brazilian bishop of the Roman Catholic Church. He was one of oldest bishops in the Catholic Church and one of the oldest Brazilian bishops.

José Nicomedes Grossi was born in Cipotânea, Brazil in September 1915, he was ordained a priest on September 21, 1940. Grossi was appointed bishop of the Diocese of Bom Jesus da Lapa on August 28, 1963 and ordained bishop January 25, 1963, where he remained until his retirement on March 15, 1990.

== See also ==
- Diocese of Bom Jesus da Lapa
