= Ivor Hale =

English cricketer

Personal information
- Full name: Ivor Edward Hale
- Born: 6 October 1922; Worcester, Worcestershire, England
- Died: 6 October 2010 (aged 88); Malvern, Worcestershire, England
- Batting: Right-handed
- Bowling: Right-arm off break

Domestic team information
- Years: Team
- 1946: Sussex
- 1947–1948: Gloucestershire

Career statistics
Competition	First-class
Matches	16
Runs scored	314
Batting average	12.56
100s/50s	–/1
Top score	61
Balls bowled	126
Wickets	2
Bowling average	32.50
5 wickets in innings	–
10 wickets in match	–
Best bowling	1/18
Catches/stumpings	8/–
- Source: Cricinfo, 17 October 2012

Ivor Edward Hale (6 October 1922 – 6 October 2010) was an English cricketer. Hale was a right-handed batsman who bowled right-arm off break. He was born at Worcester, Worcestershire, and was educated at Royal Grammar School Worcester.

Aged thirteen, Hale was given a trial at Lancashire's Old Trafford ground in 1936. Cec Parkin praised Hale following the schoolboys trial, stating "there can never have been a boy cricketer like him at his age". He also explained that Hale could spin the ball both ways and had the ability to bowl a googly.

Following World War II, Hale made his first-class debut for Sussex against Oxford University in 1946 at Priory Park, Chichester. He made two further first-class appearances for Sussex in that season, against Warwickshire and Surrey, both in the County Championship. He left Sussex at the end of that season and proceeded to join Gloucestershire, making his first-class debut for the county against the Combined Services in 1947. The following season, he made twelve first-class appearances, featuring against the touring Australians and making several appearances in the County Championship. His final first-class appearance that season came against the Combined Services. In his thirteen first-class appearances for Gloucestershire, he scored 287 runs at an average of 14.35, with a high score of 61. This score was his only half century and came against Cambridge University.

He died at Malvern, Worcestershire, on 6 October 2010, his 88th birthday.
