= Jack Stackpoole =

Australian cricketer

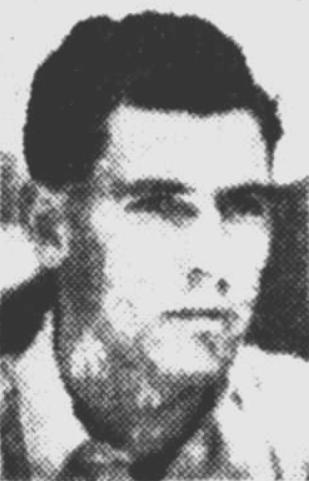

Personal information
- Born: 23 November 1916; Jundah, Queensland, Australia
- Died: 24 October 2010 (aged 93)
- Source: Cricinfo, 6 October 2020

Jack Stackpoole (23 November 1916 – 24 October 2010) was an Australian cricketer. He played in three first-class matches for Queensland between 1939 and 1941. He was one of only two bowlers to dismiss Don Bradman with their first delivery.

== See also ==
- List of Queensland first-class cricketers
