= Douglas Hooper =

English psychologist

Douglas Frederick Hooper FBPsS (27 June 1927 – 25 October 2010) was an English psychologist. He was the president of the British Association for Counselling and Psychotherapy (BACP) from 1986 to 1993.

== Early life and education ==
Hooper was born in Kingston upon Thames, the youngest of William and Edith Hooper's four children. His father died when Douglas was two, and his mother sent his siblings to an orphanage, choosing to raise Douglas as an only child. He attended Sutton Grammar School for Boys until the age of 16, when he found work as a librarian.

Hooper's national service was spent with the Royal Air Force. Upon his discharge, Hooper enrolled at Reading University to study psychology. He obtained a PhD in psychology from King's College, Cambridge, under the direction of Derek Russell Davis.

== Career ==
During his doctoral studies, Hooper began working as a counsellor for the National Marriage Guidance Council. In 1960, the Tavistock Institute of Medical Psychology hired Hooper as a researcher. He left the position two years later to work with Gerald Caplan at Harvard Medical School. Hooper returned to England in 1964, accepting a lecturer position at the University of Bristol. He was named the chair of social work at the University of Hull in 1980, a post he held until retirement seven years later. Hooper then served as the president of BACP until 1993. Four years later, he was elected vice president of Relate, which had changed its name from the National Marriage Guidance Council in 1988.

== Personal life ==
Hooper married his wife Mavis in 1950. They died in a car crash on 25 October 2010, survived by their three children.
