= Franz Xaver Schwarzenböck =

Franz Xaver Schwarzenböck (24 July 1923 – 10 October 2010) was the Catholic auxiliary bishop of Vageata and the auxiliary bishop of the Archdiocese of Munich and Freising, Germany.

Ordained on 29 June 1951, Schwarzenböck was named auxiliary of the Munich Archdiocese on 3 January 1972 and was consecrated bishop on 18 March 1972, retiring in 1998.
