= Michel d'Aillières =

French politician

Michel d'Aillières (17 December 1923, Paris - 31 October 2010) was a French politician. He represented the National Centre of Independents and Peasants from 1958 to 1962 and the Independent Republicans from 1962 to 1977 in the National Assembly. He was a Senator from 1977 to 1995 and the mayor of Aillières-Beauvoir from 1953 to 2008.
