= Champagne Salon =

Champagne producer

Coordinates: 48.946576°N 4.0004245°E

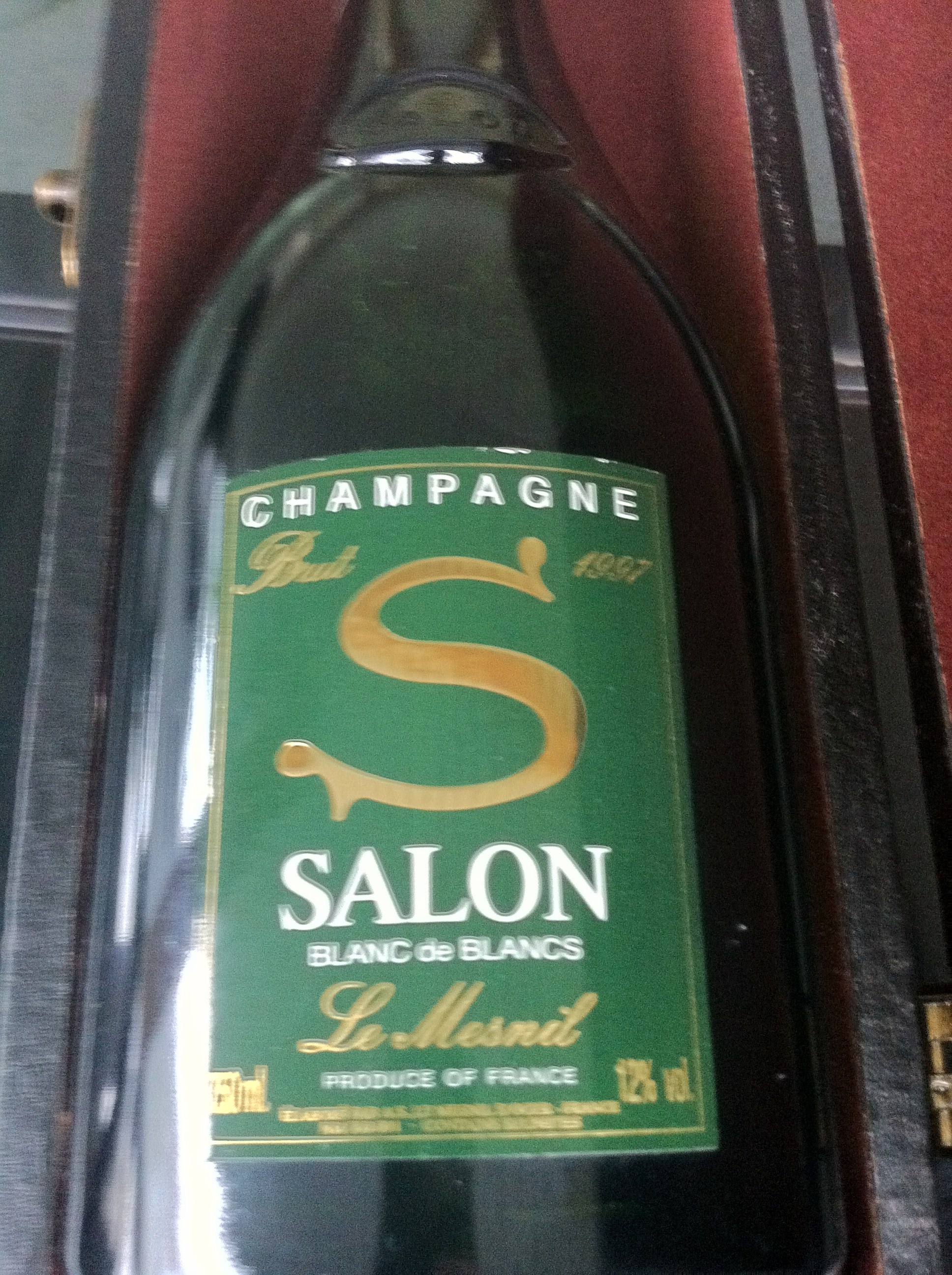
The 1997 Le Mesnil blanc de blancs made entirely from Chardonnay.

Champagne Salon is a small producer of Champagne made only in the blanc de blancs style. Salon, along with Delamotte, is part of the Laurent-Perrier group since 1989.

== History ==
Champagne Salon was founded by Eugène Aimé Salon in the early 20th century. Salon was convinced that the Chardonnay grapes from the Le Mesnil-sur-Oger vineyards could produce wine with favorable levels of finesse and elegance without the need to add Pinot noir or Pinot Meunier. Around the turn of the 20th century, Salon began producing a Chardonnay-only cuvée that he shared privately with friends. The first commercial vintage of Champagne Salon was in 1921 and by 2006, the house has released only 37 vintages under the Salon label. Following Eugène Aimé Salon's death in 1943, his sister inherited the company which was eventually sold to Laurent-Perrier in 1989. Since then, Salon is effectively part of the combined Salon-Delamotte house.

== Vineyards and winemaking ==
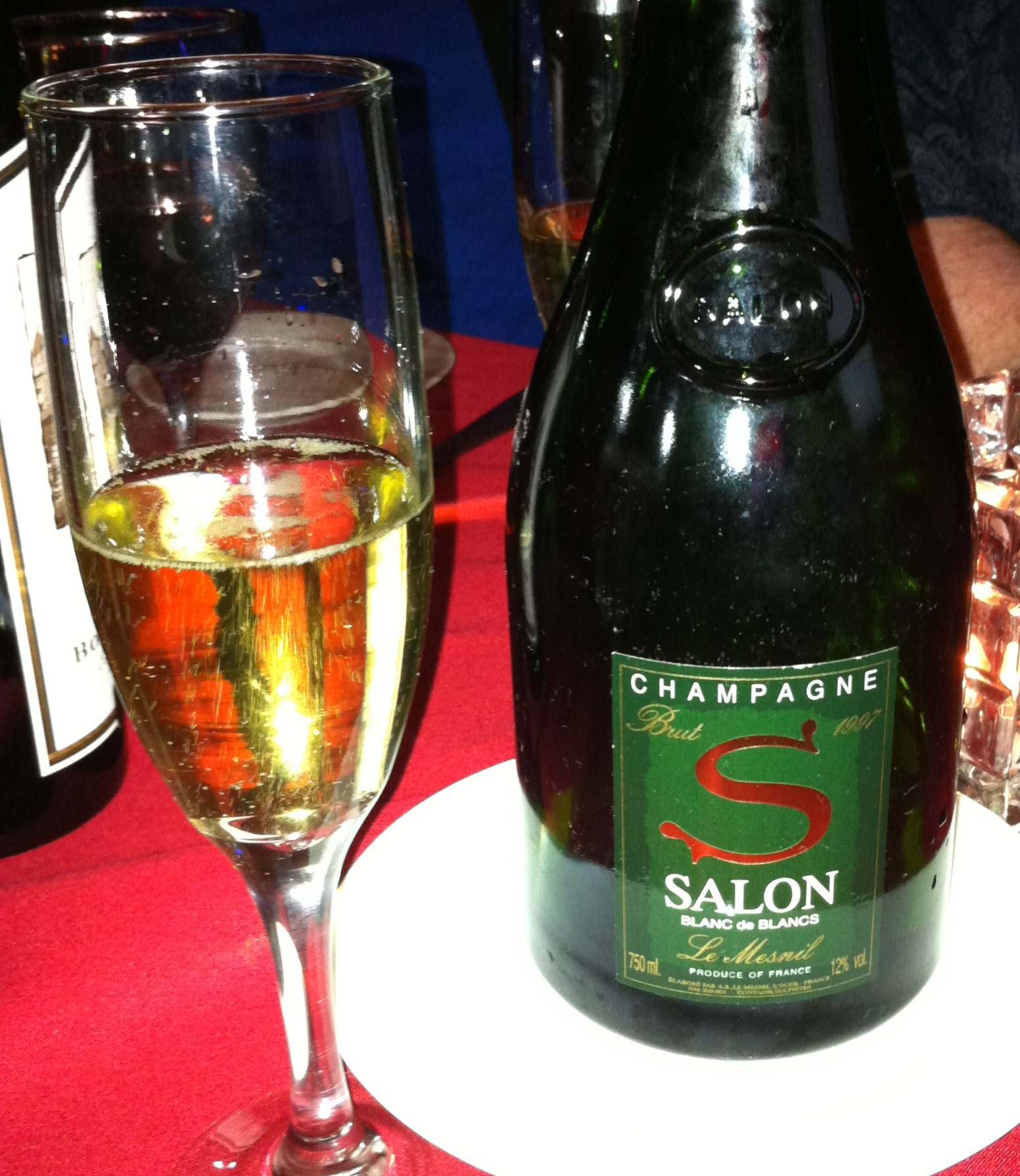
The 1997 vintage of Champagne Salon.

Salon is made from 100% Chardonnay. Its grapes are harvested from 19 small plots managed by various growers in the commune Le Mesnil-sur-Oger in the Côte des Blancs subregion of Champagne and from a single hectare plot called "Jardin de Salon."

While the village-wide terms used for classification in the Champagne region don't carry the same meaning as in Burgundy, Chablis or Alsace, Le Mesnil-sur-Oger is a Grand cru-rated vineyard area, which is the highest of three levels. The majority of the grapes for Champagne Salon average around 25 years of age with some being as old as 40.

Champagne Salon is only released under the Salon name during exceptional years, at the rate of approximately four vintages per decade. Undeclared vintages are used for Delamotte or sold off. According to the Salon website, their wines are fermented in stainless steel and allowed to age in the bottle for around ten years before release. Salon vintages are typically first released after 10+ years. Like many Champagne producers, Salon will not release an entire vintage at the same time but will hold back a certain amount to spend more time aging on the lees. In 1988, a single bottle from this vintage fetched over five times its estimated amount at a Christie's auction. In each vintage no more than 60,000 bottles are produced.

One single Champagne is produced under the Salon label.

== Vintages ==
The first vintage of Champagne Salon was 1905 and just 37 vintages were produced in the 20th century. In total, forty-five vintages have been produced with Champagne Salon 2015 available as a current vintage.

The following vintages of Champagne Salon have been released publicly:
1921, 1925, 1928, 1934, 1937, 1943, 1945, 1946, 1947, 1948, 1949, 1951, 1952, 1953, 1955, 1959, 1961, 1964, 1966, 1969, 1971, 1973, 1976, 1979, 1982, 1983, 1985, 1988, 1990, 1995, 1996, 1997, 1999, 2002, 2004, 2006, 2007, 2008 (released only in magnum format), 2012, 2013, and 2015.

Prior to public release Champagne Salon was for the personal consumption of Eugène Aimé Salon.

== See also ==
- List of Champagne houses
