= Gerhard Beyer =

German sports shooter

Personal information
- Nationality: German
- Born: 14 April 1941; Berlin, Germany
- Died: 29 October 2010 (aged 69); Vellmar, Germany

Sport
- Sport: Sports shooting

Gerhard Beyer (14 April 1941 – 29 October 2010) was a German sports shooter. He competed at the 1976 Summer Olympics and the 1984 Summer Olympics.
