= Rhiwfawr =

Coordinates: 51.7823°N 3.8154°W

Rhiwfawr is a village of just under 100 houses in the Swansea Valley, in Neath Port Talbot county borough, Wales.

== Location ==
Most of the village is high upon a ridge overlooking Cwmtwrch and most of the houses are over 900 feet (270 m) above sea level. The majority of the houses date from the 1930s and were built by the local authority, then Glamorgan, now Neath Port Talbot council to house coal miners for a local colliery that has since been closed and returned to countryside. The village has been described as "a giant family".

== Amenities ==
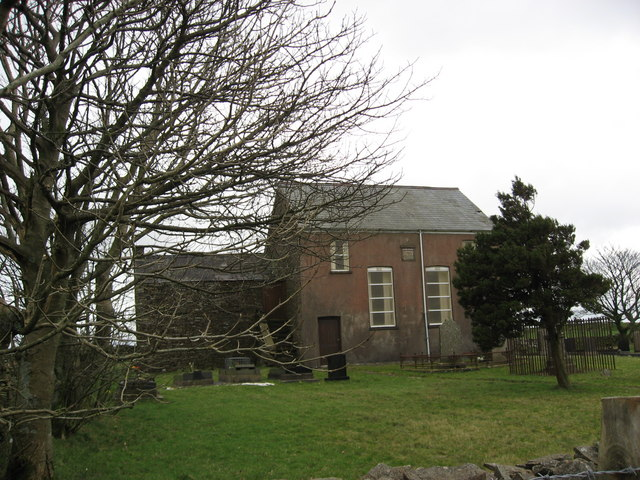
Gwrhyd Chapel

The hamlet had a primary school, a community or village hall, and a small Nonconformist chapel, now a residence. The road is now used to get to Cwmllynfell or the Gwrhyd mountain which leads to Rhyd-y-fro on the outskirts of Pontardawe.

Rhiwfawr is home to many Welsh language-speakers, mainly due to the Welsh-speaking school in its heart - Ysgol Gynradd Gymraeg Draddodiadol Rhiwfawr (English: Rhiwfawr Traditional Welsh Primary School). The school is attended by 30 - 40 children. The school celebrated its centenary in 2006. School now closed and is now residential.
