= Correctional psychology =

Applied psychology in the justice system

Correctional psychology is the application of basic and applied psychological science or scientifically-oriented professional practice to the justice system to enable the proper classification, treatment, and management of offenders. Its goal is to reduce the risk of offender misconduct and thus to improve public safety.

Other objectives of correctional psychology include contributing to the safety and well-being of staff and offenders by meeting standards of care for mentally ill individuals, reducing conflict, and creating, monitoring, and providing treatment and rehabilitation programs.

== History ==
In the 1900s, the bulk of work under correctional psychology was deciphering who was “feeble minded” and who would most likely have a long life of committing crimes. In 1913, correctional psychology was integrated into the United States' correctional psychology system, particularly in a women's penitentiary in New York. Eleanor Rowland was the first psychologist who determined which offenders could benefit from being placed in programs, and who could be safely returned to society. This process is called "custody decisions" or "treatment decisions". The first of its kind in the prison classification system, it was integrated into facilities in New Jersey in 1918, which became the first state to hire psychologists within correctional facilities.

In 1924, Wisconsin became the first state to allow psychological evaluations in its prison systems, and to implement applications for parole.

== See also ==
- Criminal psychology
- Forensic psychology
