= Paula Escarameia =

Portuguese jurist and first female member of the International Law Commission

- Born: 1 June 1960; Lisbon, Portugal
- Died: 4 October 2010 (aged 50); Lisbon, Portugal
- Occupation: Jurist
- Known for: First female member of the International Law Commission

Paula Escarameia (1960 – 2010) was a Portuguese jurist. She was the first woman to be elected by the United Nations General Assembly to the International Law Commission (ILC).

== University studies ==
Paula Ventura de Carvalho Escarameia was born in the Portuguese capital, Lisbon, on 1 June 1960. She graduated in 1983 in Law from the Catholic University of Portugal, following this with a course at the Bologna campus of the Paul H. Nitze School of Advanced International Studies (SAIS), part of the Johns Hopkins University (1984). She then went on to specialise in international law, doing her Master's (1986) and Doctorate (1988) at Harvard Law School, where she was the first Portuguese doctoral student. Her potential was recognised at an early stage and she received scholarships from the Fulbright Program, the Luso-American Foundation (FLAD), the Calouste Gulbenkian Foundation, Harvard University and the MacArthur Foundation.

== Academic career ==
Escarameia taught General and Regional Public International Law at the University of Macau (formerly the University of East Asia) in the 1989/1990 academic year. While she was in Macau she also took an interest in the legal position of the former Portuguese colony of East Timor, which at the time was under the control of Indonesia, publishing an article on the topic. She would later be one of the founders of the "International Platform of Jurists for East Timor" who supported the legal process of East Timor's independence. Returning to Portugal, she was Director of the Centre for Studies of International Institutions of the Instituto Superior de Ciências Sociais e Políticas (Higher Institute of Social and Political Sciences – ISCSP) at the University of Lisbon until December 1994.

Escarameia was a full professor at the ISCSP and guest professor at the Faculty of Law of Universidade Nova, Lisbon; the Faculty of Law and the Institute of Political Studies of the Catholic University of Lisbon; and the Technical University of Lisbon. She also taught at the training institute of the Portuguese navy. She supervised one post-doctoral thesis, four doctoral theses, and 16 master's theses. Escarameia was often invited to lecture outside Portugal, including at Princeton University, at Harvard University and at LMU Munich, as well as at organizations such as the Bar Council in the United Kingdom and the International Law Association.

== International role ==
From 1995 until 1998 Escarameia was legal advisor to the Mission of Portugal to the United Nations, representing Portugal in many negotiations and debates regarding international conventions, including those related to international terrorism, international crimes, the Law of the Sea, and the International Law Commission. She was also part of the Portuguese delegation in the negotiations for the creation of an International Criminal Court, paying particular attention to violence against women. She was also on the Portuguese delegation to the First Assembly of States Parties to that Court.

In 2002, Escarameia became the first woman and the first Portuguese to be elected by the United Nations General Assembly to the International Law Commission (ILC), a body of 34 individual experts responsible for helping to develop and codify international law by preparing draft international conventions. She served for two five-year terms, in 2008 being elected Rapporteur of the commission, a position equivalent to Under-Secretary General in the United Nations system. From 2005, she was on the list of Judges-Arbitrators at the Permanent Court of Arbitration in The Hague. Escarameia was also on the International Advisory Council of Women's Initiatives for Gender Justice and was one of the 60 members of the International Commission of Jurists.

== Other activities ==
Escarameia was an honorary member of the Associação Portuguesa de Mulheres Juristas (Portuguese Association of Women Jurists) and, in 2003, was the founder of the Centro Internacional de Direitos Económicos, Sociais e Culturais -CIDESC (National Centre of Economic, Social and Cultural Rights). She published six books and numerous articles on International Law.

== Publications ==
Paula Escarameia's main publications were the following:

- Formation of Concepts in International Law: Subsumption under Self-Determination in the Case of East Timor. Harvard, USA, 1988 (Doctoral thesis). Fundação Oriente, Lisboa, 1993
- Colectânea de Jurisprudência de Direito Internacional (Collection of Jurisprudence of International Law). Almedina Editora, Coimbra, 1992
- Colectânea de Leis de Direito Internacional (Collection of Laws of International Law). ISCSP, Lisbon, 1994, 1998, 2003
- Exames de Direito Internacional Público (Exams of Public International Law). Lex, Lisbon, 1995
- Reflexões sobre Temas de Direito Internacional Público: Timor, a ONU e o Tribunal Penal Internacional (Reflections on Themes of Public International Law: Timor, the UN and the International Criminal Court). ISCSP, Lisbon, 2001
- O Direito Internacional no Início do Século XXI (Public International Law at the Beginning of the 21st Century). Almedina Editora, Coimbra, 2003

== Awards ==
Escarameia was awarded by the Portuguese government the rank of Grand Officer of the Order of Prince Henry, in 2002.

In 2011, the Faculty of Law of NOVA University Lisbon instituted the Professor Paula Escarameia Award, which aims to distinguish and reward works whose theme falls within the area of International Law. The first award recipient successfully completed a Master's in International Law at New York University.

== Death ==
Paula Escarameia died on 4 October 2010. Following her wishes, her library was donated in 2011 to the Office of Documentation and Comparative Law of the Portuguese Attorney General's Office. The bibliographic collection consists of more than 600 volumes on international law topics, including in areas such as human rights and international humanitarian law. Important work notes were also donated, which can be consulted.
