= Stan Bisset =

Australian soldier and rugby union player

Stan Bisset MC OAM
- Born: Stanley Young Bisset; 27 August 1912; Balaclava, Victoria, Australia
- Died: 5 October 2010 (aged 98); Coolum Beach, Queensland, Australia
- Occupations: rugby union player; military officer; newsagent
- Spouses: Shirley Craig (m. 1944; div. 1967); Gloria Leeson (m. 1973)
- Children: 4
- Awards: Medal of the Order of Australia
- Military career
- Branch: Australian Army
- Service years: 1940–1945
- Rank: Captain
- Service number: VX21199
- Unit: 2/14th Battalion
- Conflicts: World War II
- Awards: Military Cross; Mentioned in dispatches
- Memorials: Stan Bisset Pavilion, Albert Park

Stan Bisset MC OAM (27 August 1912 – 5 October 2010) was an Australia national representative rugby union player, military officer and newsagent, who saw active service in World War II.

== Early life and career ==
Bisset was born in Balaclava, Victoria, (Note: The Sydney Morning Herald obituary states Bisset was born in St Kilda; yet Balaclava is listed as his birth place on both the WAtoday obituary and the Australian War Memorial service roll.) Victoria, on 27 August 1912. He was a promising Australian rules football ruckman before being persuaded to play rugby.

=== Rugby union career ===
A second-rower, goal-kicker and captain, Bisset played with the Power House Rugby Club in Melbourne. During his tenure as first grade captain at Power House, Bisset steered the side to their first premiership in 1938, earning Victorian selection along with six other Power House players. Bisset played in the last Victorian XV to beat the Waratahs in a fixture at Manly Oval in 1937, and represented Victoria against the Springboks the same year. He was one of four Victorians who were selected for the ill-fated 1939 Wallaby tour of Great Britain that was captained by Vay Wilson. The team docked at Southampton on the day when England declared war and after a couple of weeks spent filling sandbags to start the war effort, the squad set sail for Australia having not played a game. Of the unlucky tourists, only Bill McLean, Keith Windon and Len Smith would return to footballing success after the war.

== World War II ==
Bisset and the team returned home where he joined the 2/14th Battalion joining his older brother Hal, known as Butch. Stan Bisset was a lieutenant in charge of an intelligence section while Butch was a platoon commander. Both men saw service in the Middle East, and Stan Bisset was mentioned in dispatches, before Australian forces returned to the South West Pacific in 1942 to defend Australia against the Japanese push through Papua New Guinea on the Kokoda Track.

After arriving in Papua New Guinea, both Bisset brothers were sent up the Kokoda Track to relieve the 39th Battalion who were holding out the Japanese at Isurava. During the battle Stan Bisset was wounded by a bullet which grazed an eyebrow, and Butch was wounded in action on the Kokoda Track and died in Stan Bisset's arms in 1942. Butch was buried on the Track. Stan Bisset was awarded the Military Cross for actions during the attack on Palliers Hill in the Markham and Ramu valleys in September 1943. Steve Bisset suffered malaria and was repatriated to Australia. Recovered, he saw active service again in Morotai and Borneo, and was promoted as Captain. He was demobbed in 1945.

== Later life ==
Bisset married Shirley Craig in 1944 and they had four children. They divorced in 1967. He worked in sales and engineering roles in Melbourne and, in 1973, moved to Queensland where ran a newsagent. There he met and married Gloria Leeson. Bisset served on the council of the Lord Somers Camp and Power House, that was a positive influence on his life.

On 12 June 2000 Bisset was awarded the Medal of the Order of Australia for service to veterans particularly those of the 2/14th Battalion, 7th Division.

Bisset died on 5 October 2010 at a nursing home in Coolum Beach. He was survived by his second wife Gloria, and his four children. In 2026, the Power House Rugby Union Football Club built a new rugby pavilion in Albert Park, named in honour of Stan Bisset.
