= List of Egyptian films of 2010 =

A list of films produced in Egypt in 2010. For an A-Z list of films currently on Wikipedia, see Category:Egyptian films.

Date	Title	Director	Cast	Genre	Notes
10 November	Alzheimer's (Zahaimar)	Amr Arafa	Adel Emam	Comedy	
