= Let My People Go: The Story of Israel =

1965 film

- Directed by: Marshall Flaum
- Written by: Marshall Flaum
- Produced by: Marshall Flaum; Janet Voelker
- Narrated by: Richard Basehart
- Edited by: Nicholas Clapp
- Production company: David L. Wolper Productions
- Distributed by: Xerox
- Release date: 1965
- Running time: 60 minutes
- Country: United States
- Language: English

Let My People Go: The Story of Israel is a 1965 American documentary film directed by Marshall Flaum. It was nominated for an Academy Award for Best Documentary Feature in 1965. Flaum also produced and wrote the documentary.

== Overview ==
With narration by Richard Basehart and an original score by Israeli composer Marc Lavry, Let My People Go depicts the story of the efforts to create a homeland for the Jewish people, interweaving archival footage of such individuals and events reaching back to Theodor Herzl in 1897 at the First Zionist Congress in Basel, Switzerland. The film shows World Zionist Organization president Chaim Weizmann meeting with Arthur Balfour, who authored the Balfour Declaration, which stated that "His Majesty's government view with favour the establishment in Palestine of a national home for the Jewish people".

The documentary showed Jewish refugees on ships barred from entry into the Mandate Palestine following the White Paper of 1939 that restricted Jewish immigration and included film taken during the Holocaust that had not previously been seen depicting Jewish life in the Warsaw Ghetto and a young woman carrying her unmoving child, as well as the "illegals", displaced persons who had attempted to evade the British blockade after World War II who were detained in British DP camps in Cyprus. After showing people listening to a shortwave broadcast of the proceedings in 1947 at the United Nations approving the partition plan that led to the creation of the State of Israel on May 15, 1948, the film ends with men and women planting trees in memory of the six million victims of the Holocaust.

The film was broadcast in the United States in April 1965 on a nationwide network of independent stations, with the sponsorship of the Xerox Corporation.

== Critical reception ==
Let My People Go was described by critic Donald Kirkley of The Baltimore Sun as being "one of those rare programs which remind us of the heights to which television can soar when it is at its best." Television critic Jack Gould of The New York Times called the film "A documentary of remorseless realism... that seared the viewer's consciousness with the tireless nobility and animal barbarity of the human race".

== See also ==
- List of American films of 1965
