= The Yanks Are Coming (1963 film) =

1963 film

- Directed by: Marshall Flaum
- Written by: Marshall Flaum
- Produced by: Marshall Flaum
- Production company: David L. Wolper Productions
- Distributed by: ABC
- Release date: 1963
- Country: United States
- Language: English

The Yanks Are Coming is a 1963 American documentary film produced by Marshall Flaum. It was produced as a television movie for ABC. It was nominated for an Academy Award for Best Documentary Feature. Flaum wrote, produced, and directed the documentary, which is about American involvement in World War I.

== See also ==
- List of American films of 1963
