= Institute of Criminology and Criminal Justice =

Institute in Ottawa, Ontario, Canada

- Type: Public Faculty of Public and Global Affairs
- Affiliations: Carleton University
- Location: Ottawa, Ontario, Canada
- Website: Institute of Criminology and Criminal Justice

The Institute of Criminology and Criminal Justice is a division of the Faculty of Public Affairs at Carleton University in Ottawa, Ontario, Canada. It offers a Bachelor of Arts degree in Criminology and Criminal Justice (Honours). Concentrations are offered in Sociology, Psychology or Law.

The institute also offers specialized programs in areas such as law enforcement, corrections, and victimology. These programs aim to provide students with a deep understanding of the causes and consequences of crime, the workings of the criminal justice system, and the various approaches to preventing and responding to crime.
