= Louis F. Bantle =

American businessman (1928–2010)

Louis Francis Bantle (November 22, 1928 – October 10, 2010) was an American business executive who led UST Inc. and its U.S. Smokeless Tobacco Company subsidiary, overseeing a dramatic rise in the popularity of its Copenhagen and Skoal brands of dipping tobacco, as well as introducing versions of its tobacco products such as Skoal Bandits that became popular with young men in the United States taking 80% of the country's market for chewing tobacco.

== Early life ==
Bantle was born on November 22, 1928, in Bridgeport, Connecticut, to Louis A. Bantle, who served as U.S. Tobacco's chairman and chief executive until his retirement in 1972. A member of Delta Kappa Epsilon Phi Gamma chapter, he attended Syracuse University, graduating from its Martin J. Whitman School of Management in 1951 before serving as a captain in the United States Marine Corps during the Korean War.

== Career ==
In 1962, Bantle joined his father at U.S. Tobacco, where he was hired as advertising manager. As chairman of U.S. Tobacco starting in 1973, Bantle oversaw the expansion of the market for its products from a niche product largely sold in the upper Midwestern states, introducing products such as Skoal Bandits that appealed more broadly to a younger market, telling fellow executives at a marketing meeting in 1968 that "we must sell the use of tobacco in the mouth and appeal to young people". The requirement to add cancer warnings to its products and the oral cancer death of a teenager leading to an unsuccessful lawsuit against the company in 1986 slowed growth of the company's products. In June 1985, in a move "which came as a surprise to some analysts", Bantle selected former Miami Dolphins linebacker Nick Buoniconti to replace him as president and chief operating officer of the company, with Bantle retaining his role as chairman. By 1991, the Centers for Disease Control reported that 9% of American males between the ages of 18 and 24 had been regular users of smokeless tobacco, triple the rate of use in 1970 for that market. During his 20 years as chairman before his retirement as chairman and CEO in 1993, U.S. Tobacco's sales rose tenfold to $1 billion and the company was included in the Fortune 500 starting in 1985. In subsequent years, the company changed its name to the initials UST and was purchased in 2008 by Altria, the owner of the Philip Morris Companies brands of cigarettes.

== Philanthropy ==
Bantle founded the International Institute for Alcohol Education and Training, and its House of Hope center in St. Petersburg, Russia, which were created to spread the Alcoholics Anonymous treatment regime in the former Soviet Union. Through Buoniconti, Bantle became involved with the Miami Project to Cure Paralysis, which had been created in 1985 after Buoniconti's son was paralyzed while playing college football. Bantle served on the boards of his alma mater Syracuse University, as well as the Alcohol and Drug Abuse Council, the National Legal Center for the Public Interest and of the Bruce Museum of Arts and Science, in addition to other philanthropic and alcohol and drug abuse treatment programs.

== Death ==
A resident of Greenwich, Connecticut, and Palm Beach Gardens, Florida, Bantle died in Greenwich at the age of 81 on October 10, 2010, of lung cancer and emphysema. He was survived by his wife, Virginia, as well as by a daughter and four grandchildren.
