= Tours-sur-Marne =

- Commune
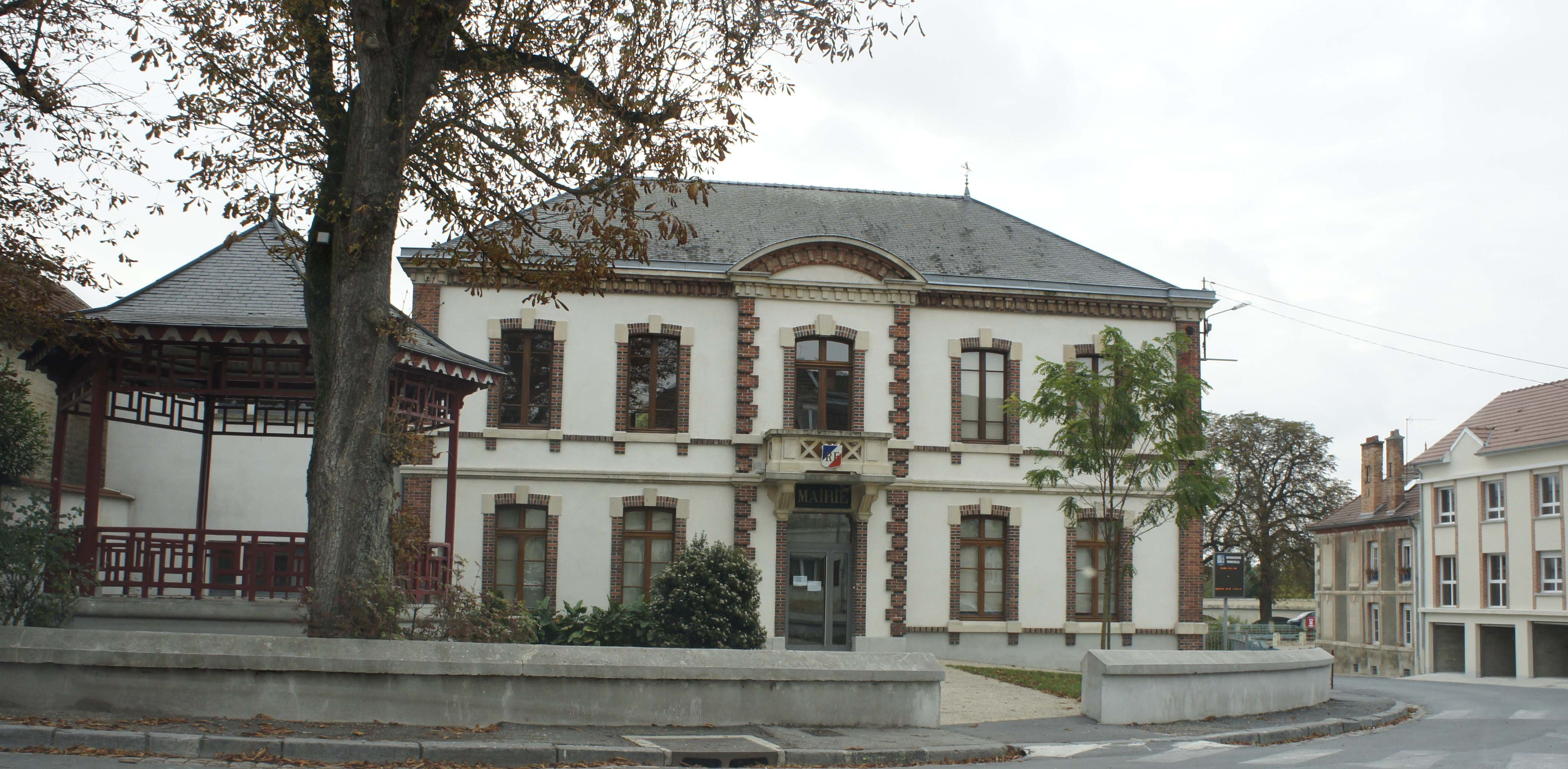
- The town hall in Tours-sur-Marne

- Coat of arms
- Location of Tours-sur-Marne
- Location within France Location within Grand Est
- Coordinates: 49°02′57″N 4°07′14″E
- Country: France
- Region: Grand Est
- Department: Marne
- Arrondissement: Épernay
- Canton: Épernay-1
- Intercommunality: Grande Vallée de la Marne

Government
  - Mayor (2020–2026): Jean-Michel Godron
- Area^{1}: 23.51 km^{2} (9.08 sq mi)
- Elevation: 143 m (469 ft)
- Population (2023): 1,360
  - Density: 57.8/km^{2} (150/sq mi)
- Time zone: UTC+01:00 (CET)
  - Summer (DST): UTC+02:00 (CEST)
- INSEE/Postal code: 51576 /51150
- ^{1} French Land Register data, which excludes lakes, ponds, glaciers > 1 km^{2} (0.386 sq mi or 247 acres) and river estuaries.

Tours-sur-Marne (French pronunciation: [tuʁ syʁ maʁn], literally Tours on Marne) is a commune in the Marne department in north-eastern France.

== Champagne ==
The village's vineyards are located in the Vallée de la Marne subregion of Champagne, and are classified as Grand Cru (100%) in the Champagne vineyard classification. Tours-sur-Marne is well known for its thriving crops of quality grapes which feed the nearby winery.

== See also ==
- Communes of the Marne department
- Classification of Champagne vineyards
- Montagne de Reims Regional Natural Park
