= Marshall Flaum =

American actor

- Born: September 13, 1925; Brooklyn, New York City, U.S.
- Died: October 1, 2010 (aged 85); Los Angeles, California, U.S.
- Years active: 1948–2003

Marshall Allen Flaum (September 13, 1925 – October 1, 2010) was an American Emmy Award-winning documentary and television director, producer and screenwriter. In addition to his five Emmy Awards, Flaum earned two Academy Award nominations for his work on the documentary films The Yanks Are Coming in 1963 and Let My People Go: The Story of Israel in 1965.

Flaum was born in Bensonhurst, Brooklyn, New York, on September 13, 1925, and was raised in Union City, New Jersey. He enlisted in the United States Army during World War II. Flaum earned a bachelor's degree in acting from the University of Iowa in 1948.

He pursued a career as a stage actor following his graduation from Iowa. Flaum returned to New York City, where he studied with acting teacher Lee Strasberg while appearing on Broadway. His Broadway credits during the period he studied under Strasberg included the 1950 production of Romeo and Juliet, which starred Olivia de Havilland, and Julius Caesar in 1951, in which he appeared opposite Basil Rathbone.

In 1957, Flaum joined the staff of the CBS documentary television series, Twentieth Century, hosted by Walter Cronkite, as a story editor, producer and writer. He won his first two Emmy Awards for his work as a writer for segments on the show.

He relocated to the Los Angeles area in 1962, where he took a position in David L. Wolper's production company. His credits at Wolper's company included Hollywood: The Selznick Years and The Battle of Britain. Flaum produced Hollywood documentaries covering such notables as Humphrey Bogart and Bing Crosby.

His 1963 Academy Award-nominated documentary The Yanks are Coming told the story of the military history of the United States in World War I, integrating music of the time with historical footage. His 1965 documentary Let My People Go: The Story of Israel provided a history of the creation of the State of Israel in the wake of The Holocaust, earning an Academy Award nomination in 1965. Let My People Go was described by critic Donald Kirkley of The Baltimore Sun as being "one of those rare programs which remind us of the heights to which television can soar when it is at its best.".

He earned a pair of Emmy Awards in 1972 for segments on dolphins and sea otters that were broadcast as part of The Undersea World of Jacques Cousteau. In 1975 and 1976, all along with Cousteau and Cousteau's son, Philippe Cousteau, he codirected Voyage to the Edge of the World. His fifth Emmy Award came the following year, when he was recognized for producing Jane Goodall and the World of Animal Behavior: The Wild Dogs of Africa.

Flaum died at the age of 85 on October 1, 2010, in Los Angeles due to complications of hip surgery. He was survived by his wife, the former Gita Miller, as well as by a daughter, a son and two grandchildren. Both of his children are film editors.
