= Deaths in July 2010 =

The following is a list of notable deaths in July 2010.

Entries for each day are listed alphabetically by surname. A typical entry lists information in the following sequence:

- Name, age, country of citizenship at birth, subsequent country of citizenship (if applicable), reason for notability, cause of death (if known), and reference.

== July 2010 ==
=== 1 ===
- Kwasi Annoh Ankama, 53, Ghanaian lawyer and politician.
- Azad, 57–58, Indian politician, shot.
- Black Tie Affair, 24, American Thoroughbred racehorse, euthanized.
- Alison Booker, 47, British radio broadcaster (BBC Oxford), breast cancer.
- Francisco Claver, 84, Filipino Jesuit priest, first Igorot bishop, Bishop of Malaybalay (1969–1984).
- Gareth Clayton, 68, Australian politician, member of the House of Representatives (1974–1975).
- Don Coryell, 85, American football coach (San Diego Chargers, St. Louis Cardinals).
- Arnold Friberg, 96, American painter, complications from a fall.
- Geoffrey Hutchings, 71, English actor (Poppy, Henry V, Topsy-Turvy), viral infection.
- Aurelio Macchi, 94, Argentine sculptor.
- Eleanor Morse, 97, American art collector, co-founder of the Salvador Dalí Museum, after long illness.
- Eddie Moussa, 26, Swedish footballer (Assyriska Föreningen), shot.
- Ong Yoke Lin, 92, Malaysian politician, minister and ambassador, founder of the Malaysian Chinese Association.
- John Rinne, 86, Finnish Orthodox prelate, archbishop of Karelia and All Finland (1987–2001).
- Singspiel, 18, Irish Thoroughbred racehorse, euthanized.
- Borivoj Vukov, 80, Serbian Olympic wrestler.
- Ilene Woods, 81, American singer and actress (Cinderella), complications from Alzheimer's disease.
- Betty Lou Young, 91, American writer and conservationist, after short illness.

=== 2 ===
- Wilfredo Alarcón, 77, Chilean Catholic priest.
- Dame Beryl Bainbridge, 77, English novelist (Harriet Said..., An Awfully Big Adventure), cancer.
- Mahfoud Ali Beiba, 57, Sahrawi politician and negotiator, President of Sahrawi National Council (2003–2010), heart attack.
- Frank Colacurcio, 93, American organized crime figure.
- Stephen Kanner, 54, American architect, co-founder of the A+D Museum, cancer.
- Simon Kornblit, 76, Belgian-born American studio executive, Executive Vice President of worldwide marketing (Universal Pictures), myeloid leukemia.
- Fred Maryanski, 63, American educator, President of Nevada State College (2005–2010).
- Carl Adam Petri, 83, German computer scientist.
- Félix Pons, 68, Spanish politician, President of the Congress of Deputies (1986–1996), cancer.
- M. G. Radhakrishnan, 70, Indian music director, liver disease.
- Leonard Searle, 79, American astronomer.
- Steve Stanlee, 90, American professional wrestler.
- Tommy Tabermann, 62, Finnish poet and politician, Member of Parliament (2007–2010), brain tumour.
- Laurent Terzieff, 75, French actor, lung complications.
- Ann Waldron, 85, American writer and biographer, heart failure.

=== 3 ===
- Carlo Aymonino, 83, Italian architect.
- Murray Chercover, 80, Canadian broadcaster and CEO (CTV Television), complications from pneumonia.
- Abu Daoud, 73, Palestinian politician and military commander, planned 1972 Summer Olympics Munich massacre, kidney failure.
- William Dougherty, 78, American politician, Lieutenant Governor of South Dakota (1971–1975), cancer.
- Herbert Erhardt, 79, German footballer, 1954 FIFA World Cup winner.
- Colin Gardner, 69, British football manager, brain cancer.
- Israel Hicks, 66, American stage director (Pittsburgh Cycle), prostate cancer.
- Cle Jeltes, 86, Dutch sailor.
- Carlos Juárez, 94, Argentine politician, Governor of Santiago del Estero Province, cardiac arrest.
- Ed Limato, 73, American talent agent, after long illness.
- Oguri Cap, 25, Japanese Thoroughbred racehorse, euthanized.
- Clara Claiborne Park, 86, American author, complications from a fall.
- Roberto Piva, 72, Brazilian poet and writer, complications from Parkinson's disease.
- Johnny Sellers, 72, American jockey.
- Michael Keith Smith, 56/7, British politician.
- Sir Frederick Warner, 100, British chemical engineer.

=== 4 ===
- Bal Bahadur Rai, 89, Nepali politician.
- Robert N. Butler, 83, American physician, Pulitzer Prize winner (Why Survive? Being Old in America), founder of NIA, leukemia.
- Mohammad Hussein Fadlallah, 74, Lebanese militant, spiritual leader to Hezbollah.
- Glenn Falkenstein, 78, American magician, complications of Alzheimer's disease.
- James Forrest, 88, South African cricketer.
- John Hampton, 103, American philanthropist, co-founder of Toys for Tots.
- Alf Howard, 104, Australian explorer.
- Hwang Yau-tai, 98, Taiwanese musician and composer, multiple organ failure.
- Oscar Kruger, 77, Canadian football player (Edmonton Eskimos), after long illness.
- John Morkel, 81, Rhodesian international rugby union player, complications from hip surgery.

=== 5 ===
- Nasr Abu Zayd, 66, Egyptian Qur'anic theologian, brain infection.
- Jim Bohlen, 84, American-born Canadian environmentalist, founder of Greenpeace.
- William R. Callahan, 78, American Jesuit priest, challenged policies of the Vatican, Parkinson's disease.
- Brazeal Dennard, 81, American conductor.
- David Fanshawe, 68, British composer (African Sanctus), explorer and ethnomusicologist, stroke.
- Jia Hongsheng, 43, Chinese actor, suicide by jumping.
- Andriy Horak, 64, Ukrainian Orthodox prelate, Metropolitan of Lviv and Sokal in Ukrainian Orthodox Church of the Kyivan Patriarchate (since 1993), after long illness.
- Juanita M. Kreps, 89, American economist, Secretary of Commerce (1977–1979), Alzheimer's disease.
- Pete Morgan, 71, British poet.
- Bob Probert, 45, Canadian ice hockey player (Detroit Red Wings, Chicago Blackhawks), heart attack.
- Victor Rodrigues, 66, Indian Konkani litterateur and novelist.
- Cesare Siepi, 87, Italian opera singer, respiratory failure.
- Tony Younger, 91, British general.

=== 6 ===
- Tilly Armstrong, 83, British writer.
- Jan Blokker, 83, Dutch journalist.
- Harvey Fuqua, 80, American rhythm and blues singer (The Moonglows), and record producer (Marvin Gaye), heart attack.
- Kristofer Leirdal, 94, Norwegian sculptor.
- Stanislaus Tobias Magombo, 42, Malawian Roman Catholic prelate, Auxiliary Bishop of Lilongwe (2009–2010).
- A. T. Mahmud, 80, Indonesian composer and television host, pneumonia.
- Igor Misko, 23, Russian ice hockey player (SKA Saint Petersburg), cardiac arrest.
- Johnny North, 89, American football player (Baltimore Colts) and coach (New Orleans Saints), after long illness.
- José Rico Pérez, 92, Spanish businessman, president of Hércules CF.
- Glenn Simpson Pound, 96, American educator.
- Ramón Eduardo Ruiz, 88, American historian of Mexico and Latin America.
- Alekos Sofianidis, 77, Turkish-born Greek footballer, manager of the Greece national football team (1988–1989).
- Rebecca Spikings-Goldsman, 42, American film producer (Mindhunters), heart attack.
- Simion Stanciu, 60, Romanian pan flautist, after long illness.
- Roberto Suárez, 82, Cuban-born American newspaper publisher (El Nuevo Herald), complications from Alzheimer's disease.
- Roy Waller, 69, British radio presenter, liver disease.

=== 7 ===
- Asher Arian, 71, American and Israeli political scientist.
- Emilio Q. Daddario, 91, American politician, U.S. Representative for Connecticut (1959–1971), heart failure.
- Frank Dochnal, 89, American racecar driver.
- Bob Harvie, Sri Lankan cricket commentator.
- John Henning, 73, American newscaster (WNAC, WCVB, WBZ), complications from leukemia.
- Robbie Jansen, 60, South African jazz musician, after long illness.
- Moko, 4, New Zealand dolphin, beached.
- Brian O'Shaughnessy, 84, Australian philosopher.
- Sándor Páll, 56, Serbian politician, leader of Democratic Fellowship of Vojvodina Hungarians.
- Bill Porter, 79, American sound engineer.
- Luz Sapag, 66, Argentine politician, mayor of San Martín de los Andes (2007–2010), car crash.
- Frederick John Thompson, 75, Canadian politician, member of the Legislative Assembly of Saskatchewan.

=== 8 ===
- Goro Azumaya, 90, Japanese mathematician.
- David Blackwell, 91, American academic, stroke.
- David Blewitt, 81, American film editor (Ghostbusters, The Competition), Parkinson's disease.
- Anders Bratholm, 90, Norwegian jurist.
- Robert Freitag, 94, Austrian-born Swiss actor.
- Clint Hartung, 87, American baseball player (New York Giants).
- Donald Hawgood, 93, Canadian Olympic silver medal-winning (1952) canoeist.
- Bidzina Kvernadze, 82, Georgian composer, Parkinson's disease.
- Guillermo León, 82, Costa Rican footballer (Deportivo Saprissa).
- Lelio Luttazzi, 87, Italian composer, actor, television and radio presenter.
- Maje McDonnell, 89, American baseball coach and official (Philadelphia Phillies).
- Achdiat Karta Mihardja, 99, Indonesian novelist and playwright, stroke.
- John Moore, 88, British naval officer and editor.
- Thomas C. Peebles, 89, American physician, isolated the measles virus.
- Willi Railo, 69, Norwegian sports psychologist.
- Patrick Rice, 64, Irish human rights activist.
- Melvin Turpin, 49, American basketball player, suicide by gunshot.
- Peter Walker, 68, Australian football player, cancer.

=== 9 ===
- Yehuda Amital, 85, Israeli rabbi and politician.
- Jessica Anderson, 93, Australian writer (Tirra Lirra by the River).
- Olle Barkander, 92, Swedish Olympic equestrian.
- Kenneth Beard, 83, British cathedral organist.
- Mark Bytheway, 46, British Quizzing world champion, esophageal cancer.
- Eleanor Coen, 93, American artist.
- Basil Davidson, 95, British journalist and historian.
- Sir Marrack Goulding, 73, British diplomat.
- Clément Guillon, 78, French Roman Catholic prelate, Bishop of Quimper and Leon.
- Daryl Hunt, 53, American football player (Houston Oilers), heart attack.
- Vonetta McGee, 65, American actress (Blacula, The Eiger Sanction), cardiac arrest.
- Milt Morin, 67, American football player (Cleveland Browns), heart attack.
- Nobuyoshi Tamura, 77, Japanese aikidoka, cancer.
- Frank Verdi, 84, American baseball player (New York Yankees).

=== 10 ===
- Eric Batchelor, 89, New Zealand soldier, twice awarded Distinguished Conduct Medal for bravery.
- Ray Beachey, 94, Canadian historian.
- John Coates, 88, British naval architect.
- David Gay, 90, English Army officer, cricketer and educator, awarded Military Cross for bravery.
- Seán Dublin Bay Rockall Loftus, 82, Irish politician and lawyer, TD for Dublin North-East (1981–1982).
- Sugar Minott, 54, Jamaican reggae singer.
- Ed Palmquist, 77, American baseball player.
- Aldo Sambrell, 79, Spanish actor, stroke.
- Ernie Stierly, 79, American racing driver.
- Kōhei Tsuka, 62, Japanese playwright, lung cancer.
- George W. Webber, 90, American minister, President of New York Theological Seminary, complications of Alzheimer's disease.

=== 11 ===
- Sheila Amos, 63, American film editor (The Thing About My Folks), leukaemia.
- Idham Chalid, 88, Indonesian politician, speaker of MPR/DPR in Indonesia (1971–1977), stroke.
- Stuart F. Feldman, 73, American lawyer and lobbyist, co-founded the Vietnam Veterans of America, pneumonia.
- Walter Hawkins, 61, American gospel music singer ("Oh Happy Day"), pancreatic cancer.
- Daja Wangchuk Meston, 39, Tibetan-born American Buddhist monk.
- Marco Aurelio Martínez Tijerina, 45, Mexican journalist, shot.
- Bob Sheppard, 99, American public address announcer (New York Yankees, New York Giants).
- Rudi Strittich, 88, Austrian football player and coach.
- Don Vélez, 62, Nicaraguan Olympic athlete.
- Arthur Williams, 63, American criminal, head injury from car crash.

=== 12 ===
- Mary Adams, 87, Scottish interceptor, Alzheimer's disease.
- Günter Behnisch, 88, German architect.
- William Derwood Cann Jr., 90, American army officer and businessman.
- Buff Cobb, 82, American actress and talk show host.
- Olga Guillot, 87, Cuban singer, infarction.
- James P. Hogan, 69, British science fiction author.
- Henryk Jankowski, 73, Polish Roman Catholic priest.
- Tuli Kupferberg, 86, American poet, cartoonist and musician (The Fugs).
- Paul Locatelli, 71, American Jesuit priest and accountant, Chancellor (2008–2010) and President (1988–2008) of Santa Clara University, pancreatic cancer.
- Thomas P. Morahan, 78, American politician, member of the New York State Assembly (1981–1982); State Senator (1999–2010), leukemia.
- Paulo Moura, 77, Brazilian saxophonist and clarinetist, lymphoma.
- Pius Njawé, 53, Cameroonian journalist and activist, car accident.
- Harvey Pekar, 70, American comic book writer (American Splendor) and music critic, accidental medication overdose.
- Mau Piailug, 78, Micronesian navigator.
- Bernardino Rivera Álvarez, 85, Bolivian Roman Catholic prelate, Auxiliary Bishop of Potosí.

=== 13 ===
- Vernon Baker, 90, American soldier, Medal of Honor recipient, cancer.
- Ken Barnes, 81, British footballer, lung cancer.
- Amanda Berenguer, 89, Uruguayan poet.
- Gilly Coman, 54, British actress (Bread), suspected heart attack.
- Dave Cox, 72, American politician, member of the California State Assembly (1998–2004), state senator (2004–2010), prostate cancer.
- Nino Defilippis, 78, Italian cyclist.
- Gene Goodreault, 91, American football player (Boston College), after long illness.
- Alan Hume, 85, English cinematographer (Return of the Jedi, A Fish Called Wanda, A View to a Kill).
- Pentti Linnosvuo, 77, Finnish sport shooter, 1956 and 1964 Olympic champion.
- Lloyd Morain, 93, American businessman, philanthropist, writer and humanist.
- Abdel Kader Rabieh, 52, Egyptian Olympic basketball player.
- André Kagwa Rwisereka, 60, Rwandan politician, murder.
- Manohari Singh, 79, Indian saxophonist, heart attack.
- George Steinbrenner, 80, American baseball team owner (New York Yankees), heart attack.

=== 14 ===
- Charles Beirne, 71, American Jesuit priest, president of Le Moyne College (2000–2007), cancer.
- Mike Kerruish, 61, Manx politician and chief judge.
- Seymour London, 95, American doctor, invented automatic sphygmomanometer, heart disease.
- Gene Ludwig, 72, American jazz organist.
- Sir Charles Mackerras, 84, American-born Australian conductor, cancer.
- Mădălina Manole, 43, Romanian pop singer, suicide by pesticide poisoning.
- Tetsuo Mizutori, 71, Japanese voice actor.
- Bernhard Nermerich, 71, German Olympic athlete.
- Derek Nicholls, 63, English cricketer, stroke.
- Joseph Rodericks, 83, Indian Roman Catholic prelate, Bishop of Jamshedpur (1970–1996).
- Eduardo Sánchez Junco, 67, Spanish businessman, founder and owner of Hello!.
- SJ Stovall, 84, American politician, mayor of Arlington, Texas (1977–1983).

=== 15 ===
- Bulbul Ahmed, 68, Bangladeshi actor.
- James E. Akins, 83, American diplomat, Ambassador to Saudi Arabia (1973–1976), heart attack.
- Wye Jamison Allanbrook, 67, American musicologist, cancer.
- Nicolas Carone, 93, American painter.
- Hank Cochran, 74, American country music singer-songwriter, pancreatic cancer.
- Peter Fernandez, 83, American voice actor (Speed Racer), lung cancer.
- Tom Gage, 67, American Olympic hammer thrower, heart failure.
- Kip King, 72, American actor, voice actor and comedian, after long illness.
- Sally Laird, 54, British editor (Index on Censorship) and translator.
- Billy Loes, 80, American baseball player (Brooklyn Dodgers), complications from diabetes.
- Luo Pinchao, 98, Chinese opera singer.
- Billy McKinney, 83, American politician, member of Georgia House of Representatives (1973–2003), cancer.
- Saša Marković Mikrob, 50, Serbian artist and journalist.
- Robin Roe, 81, Irish rugby union player, British Army chaplain.
- Knut Stensholm, 56, Norwegian drummer (Sambandet).

=== 16 ===
- Verily Anderson, 95, British novelist, memoirist and biographer.
- Aleksandr Boloshev, 63, Russian Soviet basketball player, 1972 Olympic gold medalist, stroke.
- James Gammon, 70, American actor (Major League, Nash Bridges, Cold Mountain), liver cancer.
- Kenny Kuhn, 73, American baseball player (Cleveland Indians), pancreatic cancer.
- Carlos Torres Vila, 63, Argentine folk singer, after long illness.
- David Twersky, 60, American journalist, cancer.

=== 17 ===
- Nick Bacon, 64, American soldier, Medal of Honor recipient, cancer.
- John R. Branca, 86, American Chairman of the New York State Athletic Commission, vascular disease.
- Fred Carter Jr., 76, American musician, stroke.
- Bernard Giraudeau, 63, French actor, cancer.
- Sir Simon Hornby, 75, British businessman.
- Denise Jefferson, 65, American dancer, director of the Ailey School, ovarian cancer.
- Larry Keith, 79, American actor (All My Children), cancer.
- Shaun Mawer, 50, English footballer (Grimsby Town F.C.), kidney failure.
- Pres Romanillos, 47, Filipino-born American animator (Mulan, Spirit: Stallion of the Cimarron, Pocahontas).
- Shirley Silvey, 82, American animator (The Rocky and Bullwinkle Show, Dudley Do-Right, George of the Jungle), heart failure.
- Ioannis Stefas, 61, Greek footballer (PAOK), cancer.
- Joyce Sumbi, 74, American librarian.
- Evaristus Thatho Bitsoane, 71, Mosotho Roman Catholic prelate, Bishop of Qacha's Nek (1981–2010).
- Gunārs Ulmanis, 71, Latvian footballer (FK Daugava Rīga), natural causes.

=== 18 ===
- Ashpan Annie, 94, Canadian survivor of the Halifax Explosion.
- Mary Brancker, 95, British veterinary surgeon.
- Barry Bresnihan, 66, Irish rugby union player and rheumatologist.
- Jorge Cepernic, 95, Argentine politician, governor of Santa Cruz Province (1973–1976), after long illness.
- Richard Hare, 87, British Anglican prelate, Bishop of Pontefract (1971–1992).
- John Methuen, 62, British Anglican priest, Dean of Ripon (1995–2005).

=== 19 ===
- Joseph Aghoghovbia, 69, Nigerian Olympic footballer.
- Cécile Aubry, 81, French film actress, author, screenwriter and director, lung cancer.
- Rory Brady, 52, Irish public servant, Attorney General (2002–2007).
- Jon Cleary, 92, Australian novelist (The Sundowners, High Road to China), creator of Scobie Malone.
- Mac Foster, 68, American boxer, MRSA infection.
- Sokratis Giolias, 37, Greek reporter, shot.
- Gerson Goldhaber, 86, American physicist, natural causes.
- Andy Hummel, 59, American musician (Big Star), cancer.
- Antoinette Meyer, 90, Swiss Olympic silver medal-winning (1948) alpine skier.
- Jim Neu, 66, American playwright, lung cancer.
- Stephen Schneider, 65, American climate scientist, heart attack.
- Kottakkal Sivaraman, 74, Indian Kathakali actor.
- David Warren, 85, Australian inventor of the flight data recorder.
- Lorenzen Wright, 34, American basketball player (Memphis Grizzlies), shot.

=== 20 ===
- Tyras S. Athey, 83, American politician, Maryland House of Delegates (1967–1993), Secretary of State (1993–1995).
- Milon K. Banerji, 82, Indian jurist, Attorney General (1992–1996, 2004–2009), after long illness.
- Raúl Arsenio Casado, 81, Argentine Roman Catholic prelate, Archbishop of Tucumán (1994–1999).
- John Chaston, 93, British army officer.
- Carlos Dávila Dávila, 96, American judge, Associate Justice of the Supreme Court of Puerto Rico (1961–1984).
- Sir Randal Elliott, 87, New Zealand surgeon and campaigner for safety glass, after short illness.
- Trausti Eyjólfsson, 82, Icelandic Olympic sprinter.
- Emil Gabrielian, 79, Armenian physician.
- Sandra Gardebring Ogren, 63, American judge, justice of the Minnesota Supreme Court, cancer.
- Carl Gordon, 78, American actor (Roc), non-Hodgkin lymphoma.
- Iris Gower, 75, Welsh novelist, after short illness.
- Benedikt Sigurðsson Gröndal, 86, Icelandic politician, Prime Minister (1979–1980).
- Amit Jethwa, 34, Indian environmental activist, shot.
- Jimmy McMath, 60, American baseball player.
- Lin Tsung-yi, 89, Taiwanese psychiatrist.
- Sir Robin McLaren, 75, British diplomat, cancer.
- Thomas Molnar, 89, American Roman Catholic philosopher, historian and political theorist.
- Yūzo Nakamura, 68, Japanese Olympic gold (1972) and bronze (1964) medal-winning volleyball player.
- Robert Sandall, 58, British radio presenter and music journalist, cancer.
- Peter Walls, 83, British-born Rhodesian military commander.

=== 21 ===
- Bae Ki-suk, 23, South Korean boxer, brain injury sustained during a match.
- Luis Corvalán, 93, Chilean politician, General Secretary of the Communist Party of Chile (1958–1989), natural causes.
- Edna Healey, 92, British writer, wife of Denis Healey, heart failure.
- Ralph Houk, 90, American baseball player (New York Yankees) and manager (New York Yankees, Detroit Tigers, Boston Red Sox), natural causes.
- John E. Irving, 78, Canadian businessman, after short illness.
- Randy Jackson, 61, American football player (Buffalo Bills, Philadelphia Eagles), pancreatic cancer.
- Mabel Lang, 92, American archaeologist.
- Doug Oldham, 79, American gospel music singer, complications from a fall.
- Anthony Rolfe Johnson, 69, English tenor, Alzheimer's disease.
- Wesley C. Skiles, 52, American underwater photographer and filmmaker, drowning.
- Domingos Gabriel Wisniewski, 82, Brazilian Roman Catholic prelate, Bishop of Apucarana (1983–2005).

=== 22 ===
- Magnolia Antonino, 94, Filipino politician, Senator (1969–1972).
- Vittorio Amandola, 57, Italian actor and voice actor, cancer.
- Robert Freeman Asleson, 74, American publisher, prostate cancer.
- Harry Beckett, 75, Barbadian-born British trumpeter and flugelhorn player, stroke.
- Alvin Boretz, 91, American television writer (Armstrong Circle Theatre, N.Y.P.D.).
- Dick Buckley, 85, American jazz historian and DJ, pneumonia.
- Herbert Giersch, 89, German economist.
- Kenny Guinn, 73, American politician, Governor of Nevada (1999–2007), fall.
- Peter Hart, 46, Canadian historian, brain hemorrhage.
- Bernard Knox, 95, British-born American classicist, heart failure.
- Milan Paumer, 79, Czech anti-communist fighter (1948–1953), heart failure.
- Rebel Randall, 88, American actress.
- Florencio Vargas, 78, Filipino politician, Representative for 2nd District of Cagayan (2004–2010), leukemia.
- Phillip Walker, 73, American blues musician, heart failure.

=== 23 ===
- Willy Bakken, 59, Norwegian musician and writer, cancer.
- Willem Breuker, 65, Dutch jazz musician, lung cancer.
- Kenyon Cotton, 36, American football player (Baltimore Ravens, 1997–1998), complications following surgery.
- Louis Danto, 81, Polish-born Canadian singer.
- Freddie Dunkelman, 90, British Olympic ice hockey player.
- Sol Encel, 85, Polish-born Australian sociologist.
- Jan Halldoff, 70, Swedish film director.
- A. Sreedhara Menon, 84, Indian historian.
- Feodosiy Petsyna, 60, Ukrainian Orthodox prelate, archbishop of Drohobych and Sambir in Ukrainian Orthodox Church of the Kyivan Patriarchate (1994–2006) and Ukrainian Autocephalous Orthodox Church (since 2007), diabetes mellitus.
- Daniel Schorr, 93, American journalist (CBS News, National Public Radio).
- Dorothy Stowe, 89, American-born Canadian activist, co-founder of Greenpeace.
- Bertrand Vac, 95, Canadian writer and surgeon.
- Vic Ziegel, 72, American sports writer (Daily News), lung cancer.

=== 24 ===
- David Ablett, 69, Canadian journalist and editor.
- Theo Albrecht, 88, German entrepreneur and billionaire (Aldi Nord, Trader Joe's).
- Giuseppe Aveni, 91, Italian priest and missionary, malignant tumor.
- John Callahan, 59, American cartoonist and musician.
- Alex Higgins, 61, Northern Irish snooker player, malnutrition, pneumonia, bronchial condition and throat cancer.
- Hugh Mason, 95, British Olympic rower.
- Mia Oremović, 91, Croatian actress, natural causes.
- Jean-Louis Pezant, 71, French member of the Constitutional Council of France (since 2004).
- Sir John Riddell, 13th Baronet, 76, British public servant, Private Secretary to the Prince of Wales (1985–1990).
- Haakon Sandvold, 89, Norwegian industrialist.
- Véronique Silver, 77, French actress.
- Igor Talankin, 82, Russian film director and screenwriter, People's Artist of the USSR.

=== 25 ===
- David Alexander, 77, American academic, cancer.
- Vasco de Almeida e Costa, 77, Portuguese politician, Prime Minister (1976) and Governor of Macau (1981–1986), after long illness.
- Domenico Alvaro, 85, Italian criminal, natural causes.
- Kamel Asaad, 78, Lebanese politician, after long illness.
- Donald C. Backer, 66, American astrophysicist and radio astronomer.
- Barrie Devenport, 75, New Zealand swimmer, cancer.
- Judith Peabody, 80, American socialite and philanthropist, complications of strokes.
- Nathan Quinones, 79, American educator, New York City School Chancellor (1984–1987), stroke.
- Erich Steidtmann, 95, German Nazi SS officer.
- Henk Vonhoff, 79, Dutch politician, Queen's Commissioner of Groningen (1980–1996), after short illness.
- Redford White, 54, Filipino actor and comedian, brain tumor.

=== 26 ===
- John Barbero, 65, American public address announcer (Pittsburgh Penguins, 1972–2008), brain tumor.
- Sir Brian Bell, 82, Papua New Guinean businessman and philanthropist.
- Al Goodman, 67, American soul singer (Ray, Goodman & Brown), heart failure.
- Eric Hill, 87, English cricketer.
- Jake Jacobs, 73, American baseball player.
- Ben Keith, 73, American rock musician and record producer, heart attack.
- Charles Allen Moye Jr., 92, American senior (former chief) judge, of the District Court for the Northern District of Georgia.
- Brigitte Schwaiger, 61, Austrian writer.
- Sivakant Tiwari, 64, Singaporean lawyer (Singapore Legal Service), cerebral hemorrhage.

=== 27 ===
- Andraos Abouna, 67, Iraqi Chaldean Catholic prelate, auxiliary bishop of Baghdad (2002–2010), renal failure.
- Ravi Baswani, 63, Indian actor and comedian, heart attack.
- Maury Chaykin, 61, American-born Canadian actor (Dances with Wolves, My Cousin Vinny, A Nero Wolfe Mystery), kidney failure.
- Jon Douglas, 73, American college athlete and realtor.
- Harry Galbreath, 45, American football player (Miami Dolphins), heart condition.
- Edward Gamblin, 62, Canadian First Nations singer-songwriter
- André Geerts, 54, Belgian cartoonist, cancer.
- Alan Gilbert, 65, Australian academic administrator and historian, Vice Chancellor of the University of Manchester, illness.
- Wallace Souza, 51, Brazilian television presenter, politician and criminal.
- Jack Tatum, 61, American football player (Oakland Raiders), heart attack.
- Elinor Z. Taylor, 89, American politician, member of the Pennsylvania House of Representatives (1977–2006).
- Morrie Yohai, 90, American businessman, inventor of Cheez Doodles, natural causes.

=== 28 ===
- Valentín Abecia Baldivieso, 84, Bolivian lawyer, historian, writer and diplomat.
- Thomas Anderson, 71, Australian Olympic gold medal-winning (1972) sailor.
- John Aylesworth, 80, Canadian-born American television writer and producer, co-creator of Hee Haw, complications of pneumonia.
- Michael Batterberry, 78, American editor, founder of Food and Wine Magazine, cancer.
- Ivy Bean, 104, British Internet celebrity, one of the oldest people on Facebook and Twitter, natural causes.
- Abdul Mannan Bhuiyan, 67, Bangladeshi politician.
- Maria Canals, 96, Spanish pianist.
- Bob Fenimore, 84, American football player (Chicago Bears), cancer.
- Arthur Gish, 70, American peace activist and author, tractor accident.
- Todd Hardy, 53, Canadian politician, MLA for Whitehorse Centre (1996–2000, since 2002), leader of the Yukon NDP (2002–2009).
- Kemal Idris, 87, Indonesian Army general and political dissident, pneumonia.
- George P. Lee, 67, American Mormon leader and sex offender, first Native American to become a general authority of The Church of Jesus Christ of Latter-day Saints.
- Sven Ljungberg, 96, Swedish visual artist.
- J. J. Maura, 61, American television announcer and voiceover artist (WCAU, QVC), cancer.
- István Móna, 69, Hungarian Olympic modern pentathlete, gold medalist (1968 Summer Olympics).
- Sir Daniel Pettit, 95, British Olympic footballer and industrialist.
- Derf Scratch, 58, American bassist (Fear).
- Katarzyna Sobczyk, 65, Polish singer, breast cancer.
- David William, 84, British-born Canadian actor and artistic director, head injury.

=== 29 ===
- Giancarlo Astrua, 82, Italian road bicycle racer.
- Michèle Causse, 74, French lesbian theorist, author and translator, physician-assisted suicide.
- Ignacio Coronel Villarreal, 56, Mexican drug lord (Sinaloa Cartel), shot.
- Carl Dooler, 67, British rugby league player (Featherstone Rovers).
- Martin Drew, 66, British jazz drummer, heart attack.
- António Feio, 55, Portuguese actor and comedian, pancreatic cancer.
- C. I. Gunasekera, 90, Sri Lankan cricketer.
- Bob Kennedy, 89, American football player (New York Yanks).
- Sabina Mugabe, 75, Zimbabwean politician, MP (1985–2008) and sister of Robert Mugabe, after long illness.
- Joe Perrault, 85, American Olympic ski jumper.
- Nicolae Popescu, 72, Romanian mathematician.
- Peter R. Romero, 90, American art director (The Right Stuff, The Waltons).
- Robert C. Tucker, 92, American political scientist.
- Bernie West, 92, American television writer (All in the Family, Three's Company, The Jeffersons), complications from Alzheimer's disease.
- Alex Wilson, 76, British footballer (Portsmouth F.C.).
- Lorene Yarnell, 66, American mime artist (Shields and Yarnell), brain aneurysm.
- Zheng Ji, 110, Chinese nutritionist and biochemist, world's oldest professor.

=== 30 ===
- Eugene Anderson, 82, American lawyer, pneumonia.
- Robert M. Chanock, 86, American biologist.
- Cyro Del Nero, 78, Brazilian scenographer (Fantástico), coronary disease.
- Otto Joachim, 99, German-born Canadian violist and composer of electronic music.
- Stanley Milburn, 83, British footballer.
- Qian Weichang, 96, Chinese physicist and applied mathematician.
- Keith Richman, 56, American physician and politician, California State Assemblyman (2000–2006), brain cancer.

=== 31 ===
- Suso Cecchi d'Amico, 96, Italian screenwriter (Bicycle Thieves, Senso).
- James Atkinson, 81, American Olympic silver medal-winning (1952) bobsledder.
- Olle Boström, 84, Swedish Olympic archer.
- Pedro Dellacha, 84, Argentine footballer.
- Tony Fox, 82, British Olympic rower.
- Sir John Gorst, 82, British politician, MP for Hendon North (1970–1997).
- Bill Lane, 90, American publisher and diplomat, founder of Sunset magazine, Ambassador to Australia and Nauru, respiratory failure.
- Lee Lockwood, 78, American photojournalist, diabetes.
- Tom Mankiewicz, 68, American screenwriter (James Bond, Superman), cancer.
- Mitch Miller, 99, American music executive and television host (Sing Along with Mitch), after short illness.
- Mohammad Nouri, 80, Iranian singer, blood disorder.
- Dan Resin, 79, American actor (Caddyshack, On Our Own), complications from Parkinson's disease.
- George Richey, 74, American songwriter and record producer, chronic obstructive pulmonary disease.
- Joby Shaw, 76, British rugby league player.
- Clara Sherman, 96, American Navajo artist.
- Donald Shiley, 89, American engineer, co-inventor of the Bjork–Shiley heart valve.
- Roy Smith, 56, Australian politician, member of the New South Wales Legislative Council (2007–2010).
- Iwan Tirta, 75, Indonesian batik fashion designer, complications from strokes.
