= Alarcon =

Alarcón is a historic municipality in Castile–La Mancha, Spain.

The surname Alarcón or Alarcon is of Spanish origin and may refer to:

- Agustín Alarcón (born 1962), Spanish rower, brother of Bartolomé Alarcón
- Alberto Alarcón (born 1986), Argentine footballer
- Arthur Alarcón (1925–2015), American judge
- Bartolomé Alarcón (born 1963), Spanish rower, brother of Agustín Alarcón
- Belkisyole Alarcón de Noya (born 1952), Venezuelan physician and parasitologist
- Daniel Alarcón (born 1977), Peruvian-American author
- Enrique Alarcón (1917–1995), Spanish art director
- Francisco X. Alarcón (1954–2016), Chicano poet and educator
- Francisco Alarcón Estaba (born 1950), Venezuelan writer
- Hernando de Alarcón (1485–1547), Spanish navigator
- Hugo Alarcón (1993–2019), Chilean footballer
- Isaac Alarcón (born 1998), Mexican American football player
- Isco, birth name Francisco Román Alarcón Suárez (born 1992), Spanish footballer
- Jestoni Alarcon (born 1964), Filipino actor
- Jorge Alarcón (footballer) (born 1956), Ecuadorian footballer
- Jorge Alarcón (swimmer) (born 1969), Mexican swimmer
- José Alarcón (cyclist) (born 1988), Venezuelan cyclist
- José Alarcón (politician) (1878–1940), Spanish politician
- José Alarcón Hernández (born 1945), Mexican politician
- Juan Ruiz de Alarcón (c. 1581–1639), Spanish dramatist
- Julián Alarcón (1888–1957), Paraguayan composer and violinist
- Laura Alarcón Rapu, Rapa Nui Chilean politician, Governor of Easter Island
- Lucas Alarcón (born 2000), Chilean footballer
- Manolo Alarcon de los Santos (born 1947), bishop of Virac, Philippines
- Manuel Alarcón (1941–1998), Cuban baseball player
- Mariana Alarcón (1986–2014), Argentine activist
- Martín Alarcón (1928–1988), Argentine footballer
- Martín Alarcón (athlete), Mexican long-distance runner
- Miriam Alarcón (born 1993), Spanish sports archer
- Nelly Garzón Alarcón (1932–2019), Colombian nurse, teacher
- Norma Alarcón (born 1943), Chicana author and professor
- Pedro Antonio de Alarcón, nineteenth-century Spanish novelist
- Raúl Alarcón (born 1986), Spanish cyclist
- Ricard Alarcón (born 1991), Spanish water polo player
- Ricardo Alarcón (1937–2022), Cuban politician, former president of the National Assembly of Cuba
- Richard Alarcon (born 1953), American politician, member of the Los Angeles City Council and former member of the California State Senate
- Richard Alarcón Urrutia (1952–2026), Peruvian Roman Catholic archbishop
- Rolando Alarcón Soto (1929–1973), Chilean musician
- Ruben Alarcon (died 2003), Belizean shooting victim
- Tomás Alarcón (born 1999), Chilean footballer
- Wilfredo Alarcón (1932–2010), Chilean catholic priest who survived torture and attempted execution by agents of the Pinochet dictatorship
- Williams Alarcón (born 2000), Chilean footballer
- Yosvany Alarcón (born 1984), Cuban baseball player
