= Arthur Williams =

Arthur or Art Williams may refer to:

== Government and politics ==
- Arthur B. Williams (1872–1925), U.S. congressman from Michigan
- Arthur J. Williams, member of the North Carolina General Assembly
- Arthur Henry Williams (1894–1968), Canadian trade unionist and politician
- Arthur Henry Winnington Williams (1913–2012), member of the Jamaican House of Representatives
- Arthur Trefusis Heneage Williams (1837–1885), Canadian politician and soldier
- Arthur James Williams (politician) (1880–1962), British trade unionist and Lord Mayor of Cardiff
- Arthur Williams (Australian politician) (1888–1968), Australian politician and member of the New South Wales Legislative Assembly
- Arthur John Williams (1834–1911), Welsh lawyer, author and Member of Parliament for South Glamorganshire, 1885–1895
- Arthur Williams (Samoan politician) (died 1953), member of the Legislative Council of Samoa

== Sports ==
- Art Williams (outfielder) (1877–1941), American baseball player
- Arthur Williams (footballer) (1902–1960), Australian rules footballer
- Arthur Williams (cricketer) (active 1927/8), New Zealand cricketer
- Art Williams (umpire) (1934–1979), American baseball umpire
- Art Williams (1939–2018), American basketball player
- Arthur Howard Williams (born 1950), Welsh chess master
- Essop Moosa (born 1952/1953), South African soccer player under pseudonym Arthur Williams
- Arthur Williams (boxer) (born 1964), American boxer
- Arthur Williams (presenter) (born 1986), British television presenter and Paralympic cyclist
- Pop Williams (American football) (1906–1979), American football player

== Other ==
- Arthur Williams (actor) (1844–1915), English actor, singer and playwright
- Arthur Williams (bishop) (1848–1914), Anglican colonial bishop
- Arthur Williams (trade unionist) (1899–?), British trade union leader
- Arthur Benjamin Williams Jr. (born 1935), bishop of the Episcopal Diocese of Ohio
- Arthur Williams (electrical engineer) (1868–1937), American electrical engineer and executive
- Arthur Williams (priest) (1899–1974), English Anglican Archdeacon of Bodmin
- Arthur J. Williams Jr. (born 1972), American-born counterfeiter and subject of the book, The Art of Making Money
- Arthur Williams (Elevator Bandit) (1946–2010), American career criminal known as the "Elevator Bandit"
- Arthur E. Williams (born 1938), U.S. Army general
- Arthur G. Jones-Williams (1898–1929), Welsh pilot
- Arthur L. Williams Jr. (born 1942), founder of Primerica Financial Services
- Lukyn Williams (Arthur Lukyn Williams, 1853–1943), Christian author
- Arthur Stanley Williams (1861–1938), British solicitor and amateur astronomer
- Arthur James Williams, pilot who helped develop aviation in Guyana, then British Guiana
- Arthur Llewellyn Williams (1856–1919), bishop of Nebraska
- Arthur Williams (rugby league) (1902–1948), Australian rugby league footballer
