= 2010–11 in English football =

Football in England
- Season: 2010–11

Men's football
- Premier League: Manchester United
- Championship: Queens Park Rangers
- League One: Brighton & Hove Albion
- League Two: Chesterfield
- Conference National: Crawley Town
- FA Cup: Manchester City
- League Cup: Birmingham City
- Community Shield: Manchester United

Women's football
- WSL: Arsenal
- FA Women's Premier League National Division: Sunderland
- FA Women's Premier League Northern Division: Aston Villa
- FA Women's Premier League Southern Division: Charlton Athletic
- FA Women's Cup: Arsenal
- WSL Cup: Arsenal

The 2010–11 season was the 131st season of competitive football in England.

The season began on 6 August 2010 for the Football Leagues, with the Premier League and Football Conference both starting eight days later on 14 August 2010. The Championship, League One, and League Two ended on 7 May 2011. The Premier League finished on 22 May 2011.

== Promotion and relegation ==
Teams promoted to Premier League ▲

- Newcastle United ▲
- West Bromwich Albion ▲
- Blackpool ▲

Teams relegated from Premier League ▼

- Hull City ▼
- Burnley ▼
- Portsmouth ▼

Teams promoted to Championship ▲

- Norwich City ▲
- Leeds United ▲
- Millwall ▲

Teams relegated from Championship ▼

- Sheffield Wednesday ▼
- Plymouth Argyle ▼
- Peterborough United ▼

Teams promoted to League One ▲

- Notts County ▲
- Rochdale ▲
- Bournemouth ▲
- Dagenham & Redbridge ▲

Teams relegated from League One ▼

- Gillingham ▼
- Wycombe Wanderers ▼
- Southend United ▼
- Stockport County ▼

Teams promoted to League Two ▲

- Stevenage ▲
- Oxford United ▲

Teams relegated from League Two ▼

- Grimsby Town ▼
- Darlington ▼

== Managerial changes ==
| Name | Club | Date of departure | Replacement | Date of appointment |
|---|---|---|---|---|
| Martin O'Neill | Aston Villa | 9 August 2010 | Gérard Houllier | 8 September 2010 |
| Steve Coppell | Bristol City | 12 August 2010 | Keith Millen | 12 August 2010 |
| Kevin Blackwell | Sheffield United | 14 August 2010 | Gary Speed | 17 August 2010 |
| Chris Turner | Hartlepool United | 19 August 2010 | Mick Wadsworth | 1 December 2010 |
| Alan Pardew | Southampton | 30 August 2010 | Nigel Adkins | 12 September 2010 |
| Nigel Adkins | Scunthorpe United | 12 September 2010 | Ian Baraclough | 24 September 2010 |
| Chris Sutton | Lincoln City | 29 September 2010 | Steve Tilson | 15 October 2010 |
| Paulo Sousa | Leicester City | 1 October 2010 | Sven-Göran Eriksson | 3 October 2010 |
| Simon Davey | Hereford United | 4 October 2010 | Jamie Pitman | 16 December 2010 |
| Gordon Strachan | Middlesbrough | 18 October 2010 | Tony Mowbray | 26 October 2010 |
| Craig Short | Notts County | 24 October 2010 | Paul Ince | 28 October 2010 |
| Chris Hughton | Newcastle United | 6 December 2010 | Alan Pardew | 9 December 2010 |
| Sam Allardyce | Blackburn Rovers | 13 December 2010 | Steve Kean | 22 December 2010 |
| Gary Speed | Sheffield United | 14 December 2010 | Micky Adams | 30 December 2010 |
| Paul Trollope | Bristol Rovers | 15 December 2010 | Dave Penney | 10 January 2011 |
| Brian Laws | Burnley | 29 December 2010 | Eddie Howe | 17 January 2011 |
| Darren Ferguson | Preston North End | 29 December 2010 | Phil Brown | 6 January 2011 |
| Micky Adams | Port Vale | 30 December 2010 | Jim Gannon | 6 January 2011 |
| George Burley | Crystal Palace | 1 January 2011 | Dougie Freedman | 11 January 2011 |
| Mark Stimson | Barnet | 1 January 2011 | Martin Allen | 23 March 2011 |
| Chris Hutchings | Walsall | 4 January 2011 | Dean Smith | 21 January 2011 |
| Phil Parkinson | Charlton Athletic | 4 January 2011 | Chris Powell | 14 January 2011 |
| Paul Simpson | Stockport County | 4 January 2011 | Ray Mathias | 9 March 2011 |
| Roy Keane | Ipswich Town | 7 January 2011 | Paul Jewell | 10 January 2011 |
| Roy Hodgson | Liverpool | 8 January 2011 | Kenny Dalglish | 8 January 2011 |
| Kevin Dillon | Aldershot Town | 10 January 2011 | Dean Holdsworth | 11 January 2011 |
| Gary Johnson | Peterborough United | 10 January 2011 | Darren Ferguson | 12 January 2011 |
| Eddie Howe | Bournemouth | 17 January 2011 | Lee Bradbury | 28 January 2011 |
| Alan Irvine | Sheffield Wednesday | 3 February 2011 | Gary Megson | 4 February 2011 |
| Andy Scott | Brentford | 3 February 2011 | Nicky Forster | 2 March 2011 |
| Roberto Di Matteo | West Bromwich Albion | 6 February 2011 | Roy Hodgson | 11 February 2011 |
| Peter Taylor | Bradford City | 26 February 2011 | Peter Jackson | 28 February 2011 |
| Ian Sampson | Northampton Town | 2 March 2011 | Gary Johnson | 5 March 2011 |
| Danny Wilson | Swindon Town | 2 March 2011 | Paul Hart | 3 March 2011 |
| Dave Penney | Bristol Rovers | 7 March 2011 | Paul Buckle | 30 May 2011 |
| Aidy Boothroyd | Coventry City | 14 March 2011 | Andy Thorn | 28 April 2011 |
| Ian Baraclough | Scunthorpe United | 16 March 2011 | Alan Knill | 31 March 2011 |
| Jim Gannon | Port Vale | 21 March 2011 | Micky Adams | 13 May 2011 |
| Ronnie Moore | Rotherham United | 22 March 2011 | Andy Scott | 13 April 2011 |
| Alan Knill | Bury | 31 March 2011 | Richard Barker | 1 June 2011 |
| Paul Ince | Notts County | 3 April 2011 | Martin Allen | 11 April 2011 |
| Martin Allen | Barnet | 11 April 2011 | Lawrie Sanchez | 13 May 2011 |
| Paul Hart | Swindon Town | 27 April 2011 | Paolo Di Canio | 20 May 2011 |
| Sammy McIlroy | Morecambe | 9 May 2011 | Jim Bentley | 13 May 2011 |
| Micky Adams | Sheffield United | 10 May 2011 | Danny Wilson | 26 May 2011 |
| Mark Robins | Barnsley | 12 May 2011 | Keith Hill | 31 May 2011 |
| Avram Grant | West Ham United | 15 May 2011 | Sam Allardyce | 1 June 2011 |
| Nicky Forster | Brentford | 19 May 2011 | Uwe Rosler | 10 June 2011 |
| Carlo Ancelotti | Chelsea | 22 May 2011 | André Villas-Boas | 22 June 2011 |
| Dave Jones | Cardiff City | 30 May 2011 | Malky Mackay | 17 June 2011 |
| Paul Buckle | Torquay United | 30 May 2011 | Martin Ling | 13 June 2011 |
| Keith Hill | Rochdale | 31 May 2011 | Steve Eyre | 12 June 2011 |
| Gérard Houllier | Aston Villa | 1 June 2011 | Alex McLeish | 17 June 2011 |
| Mark Hughes | Fulham | 2 June 2011 | Martin Jol | 7 June 2011 |
| Billy Davies | Nottingham Forest | 12 June 2011 | Steve McClaren | 13 June 2011 |
| Alex McLeish | Birmingham City | 12 June 2011 | Chris Hughton | 22 June 2011 |
| Malky Mackay | Watford | 17 June 2011 | Sean Dyche | 21 June 2011 |
| Ray Mathias | Stockport County | 5 July 2011 | Dietmar Hamann | 5 July 2011 |

== New clubs ==
- Bromsgrove Sporting F.C. was formed by fans of Bromsgrove Rovers before the season began and before the original club folded. They were accepted into the Midland Football Combination Division two (level 12) while the original club was expelled from the Southern League, Division One South & West (Level 8)
- Chester F.C. was formed by fans of Chester City F.C. which had folded. They were accepted into the Northern Premier League Division One North (level 8), while the original club had been expelled from the Conference National (level 5).
- Merthyr Town F.C. was formed by fans of Merthyr Tydfil F.C. which had folded. They were accepted into the Western Football League Division One (level 10), while the original club had been expelled from the Southern Football League Premier Division (level 7)

== Clubs removed ==
- Bromsgrove Rovers, expelled from Southern League, Division One South & West (Level 8), 11 August 2010.
- Ilkeston Town, expelled from Conference North (Level 6), 8 September 2010.
- Leyton, expelled from Isthmian League, Division One North (Level 8), 14 January 2011.
- Atherstone Town, resigned from Southern League Division One Central (Level 8) at the end of the season. Announced 18 December 2010.
- Windsor & Eton, expelled from Southern League, Premier Division (Level 7), 2 February 2011.
  - Windsor formed out of club's demise, and competed in the Combined Counties Football League (level 9) in 2011–12
- Almondsbury Town, resigned from Southern League, Division One South & West (Level 8) at end of season. Announced 7 April 2011.
- Leigh Genesis, resigned from North West Counties Football League (level 9) after season finished. Announced 2 June 2011.
- Rushden & Diamonds, expelled from 2011–12 Conference National (level 5) after season finished. Announced 11 June 2011.
  - AFC Rushden & Diamonds formed out of club's demise and will field a senior team in 2012–13.
- Rossendale United, expelled from 2011–12 North West Counties Football League (level 9) after season finished. Announced 18 June 2011.

== Retirements ==
- July 2010 – Chris Lumsdon, 30, former Sunderland, Barnsley, Carlisle United and Darlington midfielder.
- 24 August 2010 – Sam Hutchinson, 21, former Chelsea defender.
- 26 August 2010 – Matt Murray, 29, former Wolverhampton Wanderers goalkeeper.
- January 2011 – Gavin McCann, 33, former Everton, Sunderland, Aston Villa and Bolton Wanderers midfielder who won one cap for England.
- 2 February 2011 – Gary Neville, 35, former England and Manchester United full back.
- 5 March 2011 – Miki Roqué, 22, former Liverpool and Oldham Athletic defender.
- 8 March 2011 – Chris Armstrong, 28, former Bury, Oldham Athletic, Sheffield United and Reading defender.
- 10 March 2011 – Sean McDaid, 25, former Doncaster Rovers and Carlisle United defender.
- 29 April 2011 – Michael Bridges, 32, former Sunderland, Leeds United, Bristol City, Carlisle United, Hull City and MK Dons striker.
- 22 May 2011 – Jerzy Dudek, 38, former Poland and Liverpool goalkeeper.
- 30 May 2011 – Claude Makélélé, 38, former France and Chelsea midfielder.
- 31 May 2011 – Paul Scholes, 36, former England and Manchester United midfielder.
- 6 June 2011 – Jon Dahl Tomasson, 34, former Denmark and Newcastle United striker.
- Summer 2011 – Edwin van der Sar, 40, former Netherlands, Fulham and Manchester United goalkeeper.
- Summer 2011 – Sami Hyypiä, 37, former Finland and Liverpool defender.
- Summer 2011 – Robbie Savage, 36, former Wales, Crewe Alexandra, Leicester City, Birmingham City, Blackburn Rovers and Derby County midfielder.
- Summer 2011 – Paul Hartley, 34, former Scotland, Millwall and Bristol City midfielder.
- Summer 2011 – Tony Roberts, 41, former Dagenham & Redbridge, QPR & Wales goalkeeper.

== Deaths ==
- 14 July 2010 – Ken Barnes, 81, wing-half who made 283 appearances for Manchester City, and was a member of the City side that won the FA Cup in 1956. Later became manager of Wrexham before returning to City as chief scout
- 17 July 2010 – Shaun Mawer, 50, full back who made 60 appearances for Grimsby Town from 1977 to 1980
- 30 July 2010 – Stanley Milburn, 83, played for Ashington, Chesterfield, Leicester City and Rochdale and had one England B team cap. Uncle of Jack and Bobby Charlton.
- 10 August 2010 – Brian Clark, 67, forward who made over 600 appearances in The Football League, most notably with Cardiff City and Bristol City.
- 10 August 2010 – Adam Stansfield, 31, Exeter City forward who made over 300 career appearances for Yeovil Town, Hereford United and Exeter City.
- 10 August 2010 – Markus Liebherr, 62, owner of Southampton F.C.
- 15 August 2010 – John Green, 71, midfielder who made 250 league appearances for Tranmere Rovers, Blackpool and Port Vale.
- 18 September 2010 – Bobby Smith, 77, who was a key member of Tottenham Hotspur's double winning side of 1961 .
- 1 October 2010 – Ian Buxton, 72, inside-forward who made 215 league appearances for Derby County, Luton Town, Notts County and Port Vale; also a captain of Derbyshire County Cricket Club.
- 13 October 2010 – Eddie Baily, 85, inside-forward who made 419 league appearances for Tottenham Hotspur, Port Vale, Nottingham Forest, and Leyton Orient, and the England national team; part of the Spurs 1950–51 League winning side.
- 15 October 2010 – Malcolm Allison, 83, best remembered for his spell as coach under Joe Mercer at Manchester City during the successes of the late 1960s and early 1970s, and for his later but less successful spell as the club's manager.
- 29 October 2010 – Ronnie Clayton, 76, Right-half who made 35 appearances England, many as the skipper. Clayton was one of the most recognised wing-halves of his generation, during his 21-year career from 1950 to 1971, he spent 19 years at Blackburn Rovers.
- 30 October 2010 – John Benson, 67, Scottish football player and manager. Notably playing for Torquay United in the 60's, and for managing and directing Wigan Athletic.
- 14 December 2010 – Dale Roberts, 24, former Nottingham Forest goalkeeper playing for Conference National team Rushden & Diamonds. Roberts also featured for the England C team. His death was a suspected suicide.
- 17 December 2010 – Ralph Coates, 64, former Burnley, Tottenham Hotspur, Leyton Orient and England forward.
- 28 December 2010 – Avi Cohen, 54, former Liverpool defender who scored the club's title-clinching goal in 1980. Was also a captain of the Israel national football team. Died from injuries sustained in a motorcycling accident in his native Israel.
- 10 January 2011 – Richard Butcher, 29, Macclesfield Town midfielder, who also enjoyed spells with Northampton Town, Kettering Town, Oldham Athletic, Peterborough United, Notts County and Lincoln City.
- 15 January 2011 – Nat Lofthouse, 85, spent his entire career at Bolton Wanderers as a striker, scoring 285 goals in 503 appearances from 1946 to 1960, along with scoring 30 goals in 33 appearances for England.
- 26 January 2011 – David Knowles, 69, former Bradford City goalkeeper.
- 3 February 2011 – Neil Young, 66, former Manchester City striker.
- 20 February 2011 – Tony Kellow, 58, former Exeter City, Blackpool, Plymouth Argyle, Swansea and Newport County striker.
- 26 February 2011 – Dean Richards, 36, former Tottenham and Wolves defender.
- 23 March 2011 – Trevor Storton, 61, former Tranmere Rovers, Liverpool and Chester City defender.

== Honours ==
=== Trophy and League champions ===
| Competition | Winner | Details | At | Match Report |
|---|---|---|---|---|
| FA Cup | Manchester City | 2010–11 FA Cup beat Stoke City 1–0 | Wembley | Report |
| League Cup | Birmingham City | 2010–11 Football League Cup beat Arsenal 2–1 | Wembley | Report |
| Premier League | Manchester United | 2010–11 Premier League | Ewood Park | Report |
| Football League Championship | Queens Park Rangers | 2010–11 Football League Championship | Loftus Road | Report |
| Football League One | Brighton & Hove Albion | 2010–11 Football League One | Withdean Stadium | Report |
| Football League Two | Chesterfield | 2010–11 Football League Two | B2net Stadium | Report |
| FA Community Shield | Manchester United | 2010 FA Community Shield beat Chelsea 3–1 | Wembley | Report |
| Football League Trophy | Carlisle United | 2010–11 Football League Trophy beat Brentford 1–0 | Wembley | Report |
| FA Trophy | Darlington | 2010–11 FA Trophy beat Mansfield Town 1–0 | Wembley | Report |

=== Playoff winners ===
| Competition | Winner | Details |
|---|---|---|
| Football League Championship | Swansea City | 2010–11 Football League Championship; Beat Reading 4–2 |
| Football League One | Peterborough United | 2010–11 Football League One; Beat Huddersfield Town 3–0 |
| Football League Two | Stevenage | 2010–11 Football League Two; Beat Torquay United 1–0 |
| Conference National | AFC Wimbledon | 2010–11 Conference National; Beat Luton Town 4–3 on penalties (0–0 final score) |
| Conference North | Telford United | 2010–11 Conference North; Beat Guiseley 3–2 |
| Conference South | Ebbsfleet United | 2010–11 Conference South; Beat Farnborough 4–2 |

== League tables ==
=== Premier League ===
Manchester United won their 12th Premier League title and their 19th championship overall, beating Liverpool's record of 18 championships set in 1990. A late surge consigned Chelsea to a second-place finish; their season fell apart following the departure of first-team coach Ray Wilkins in early November and this coincided with a horrendous run of form in the winter as they picked up just 10 points from 11 games, with manager Carlo Ancelotti losing his job on the final day. Arsenal qualified for the Champions League in 4th, having been realistic outsiders for the league title until losing the League Cup final, at which point they won just two of their last 11 league games, falling behind 3rd placed Manchester City, who entered Europe's elite competition for the first time after overturning a 5-point deficit with 3 games left. Tottenham settled for the Europa League spot, though they had an impressive first Champions League run that took them to the quarterfinals.

Liverpool – who managed to put a terrible League start under Roy Hodgson behind them – seemed as if they were going to finish 5th under Kenny Dalglish, but lost their last two games and had to settle for 6th. This meant that they failed to qualify for any European competition for the first time in 12 years. Merseyside rivals Everton finished immediately behind them in seventh place, after a much improved second half of the campaign. Fulham rose up the table to finish eighth, and qualify for the Europa League via the Fair Play League. Stoke also qualified for the Europa League by reaching their first ever FA Cup Final, despite losing by a single goal to eventual winners Manchester City. Martin O'Neill, just days before the campaign began, resigned from his position as Aston Villa manager. This hit Villa immensely and they found themselves in a relegation battle for much of the season, despite the efforts of former Liverpool manager Gérard Houllier. They confirmed survival with a 9th-place finish, but only after Houllier took a leave of absence following a heart scare with a few weeks to go.

Newly promoted West Bromwich Albion and Newcastle United also enjoyed decent finishes, in eleventh and twelfth places respectively. Albion began the season well under Roberto di Matteo until a loss in form saw them fall down the table. With Albion just above the drop zone, the Italian was replaced by Roy Hodgson, who recovered from his disappointing Liverpool tenure to steer the Baggies away from relegation trouble. Newcastle's twelfth place was achieved despite the surprise sacking of Chris Hughton, who was replaced by Alan Pardew, and the departure of striker Andy Carroll to Liverpool for £35 million in January.

West Ham United were the first team to go down, despite the efforts of their star midfielder Scott Parker (who won the Footballer of the Year Award); the Hammers' relegation was confirmed following a 3–2 defeat at Wigan. Blackpool returned to the Championship after a run of only three wins from their last 21 games, despite a league double over Liverpool. Despite winning the Football League Cup (and thereby qualifying for the following season's Europa League), Birmingham were relegated on the last day after they suffered a late season slump in form, enabling close rivals Wolves, as well as Blackburn and Wigan, to survive in one of the top-flight's tightest relegation battles.

| Pos | Team | Pld | W | D | L | GF | GA | GD | Pts | Qualification or relegation |
|---|---|---|---|---|---|---|---|---|---|---|
| 1 | Manchester United (C) | 38 | 23 | 11 | 4 | 78 | 37 | +41 | 80 | Qualification for the Champions League group stage |
| 2 | Chelsea | 38 | 21 | 8 | 9 | 69 | 33 | +36 | 71 | Qualification for the Champions League group stage |
| 3 | Manchester City | 38 | 21 | 8 | 9 | 60 | 33 | +27 | 71 | Qualification for the Champions League group stage |
| 4 | Arsenal | 38 | 19 | 11 | 8 | 72 | 43 | +29 | 68 | Qualification for the Champions League play-off round |
| 5 | Tottenham Hotspur | 38 | 16 | 14 | 8 | 55 | 46 | +9 | 62 | Qualification for the Europa League play-off round |
| 6 | Liverpool | 38 | 17 | 7 | 14 | 59 | 44 | +15 | 58 | |
| 7 | Everton | 38 | 13 | 15 | 10 | 51 | 45 | +6 | 54 | |
| 8 | Fulham | 38 | 11 | 16 | 11 | 49 | 43 | +6 | 49 | Qualification for the Europa League first qualifying round (Note: Fulham, as the highest-ranked team from the Fair Play table not yet qualified for any European competition, entered the first qualifying round of the Europa League.) |
| 9 | Aston Villa | 38 | 12 | 12 | 14 | 48 | 59 | −11 | 48 | |
| 10 | Sunderland | 38 | 12 | 11 | 15 | 45 | 56 | −11 | 47 | |
| 11 | West Bromwich Albion | 38 | 12 | 11 | 15 | 56 | 71 | −15 | 47 | |
| 12 | Newcastle United | 38 | 11 | 13 | 14 | 56 | 57 | −1 | 46 | |
| 13 | Stoke City | 38 | 13 | 7 | 18 | 46 | 48 | −2 | 46 | Qualification for the Europa League third qualifying round (Note: Stoke City qualified for the third qualifying round of the Europa League as FA Cup runners-up to Champions League-qualified Manchester City.) |
| 14 | Bolton Wanderers | 38 | 12 | 10 | 16 | 52 | 56 | −4 | 46 | |
| 15 | Blackburn Rovers | 38 | 11 | 10 | 17 | 46 | 59 | −13 | 43 | |
| 16 | Wigan Athletic | 38 | 9 | 15 | 14 | 40 | 61 | −21 | 42 | |
| 17 | Wolverhampton Wanderers | 38 | 11 | 7 | 20 | 46 | 66 | −20 | 40 | |
| 18 | Birmingham City (R) | 38 | 8 | 15 | 15 | 37 | 58 | −21 | 39 | Qualification for the Europa League play-off round and relegation to Football League Championship (Note: Birmingham City qualified for the play-off round of the Europa League after winning the League Cup, worth a third qualification round spot, and subsequently being moved up a round due to the outcome of the FA Cup final.) |
| 19 | Blackpool (R) | 38 | 10 | 9 | 19 | 55 | 78 | −23 | 39 | Relegation to Football League Championship |
| 20 | West Ham United (R) | 38 | 7 | 12 | 19 | 43 | 70 | −27 | 33 | Relegation to Football League Championship |

Source: Barclays Premier League
Rules for classification: 1) points; 2) goal difference; 3) number of goals scored.
(C) Champions; (R) Relegated
Notes:

Leading goalscorers: Dimitar Berbatov (Manchester United) and Carlos Tevez (Manchester City) – 21

=== Football League Championship ===
Queens Park Rangers won the Championship and returned to the Premier League after a fifteen-year absence. Neil Warnock became the first manager in six years to complete a full season in charge with the club, and equalled the record for the most promotions ever won by a single manager. The runners-up spot was taken by Norwich City, who earned their second successive promotion under Paul Lambert and became only the third English club to achieve back to back promotions to the top flight, and the first since Manchester City 11 years previous. Swansea City were promoted via the play-offs after beating Reading in the play-off final, becoming the first Welsh club ever to play in the Premier League. Ironically, Swansea manager Brendan Rodgers was a former manager of Reading, having been sacked by the Royals midway through the previous season.

None of the three teams relegated from the Premier League in the previous season were able to mount a challenge for promotion. Burnley, whom many tipped for an immediate return to the top flight, ultimately fell just short of the top six, but the efforts of Hull City and Portsmouth were hindered by respective financial constraints. Cardiff City were the league's biggest chokers as they threw away their chances of automatic promotion in shocking fashion, amid reports of several players seen out drinking in the early hours before a crucial game against Middlesbrough, meaning they had to settle for the play-offs. Dave Jones was sacked at the end of May after they were crushed by losing play-off finalists Reading.

Scunthorpe United were unable for a consecutive season to escape the consequences of competing against teams with more financial resources and were relegated, despite the arrival of Alan Knill. Sheffield United were relegated only a year after their cross-city counterparts, meaning that the Steel City derby would now be taking place in the third tier since 1980, the sacking of Kevin Blackwell after just two games and subsequent managerial instability proving their downfall. The third relegated club was Preston North End, who had been the longest-serving members of the Championship, having been in the division since 2000. Much like Sheffield United, their decision to replace manager Darren Ferguson backfired on them.

| Pos | Team | Pld | W | D | L | GF | GA | GD | Pts | Promotion, qualification or relegation |
|---|---|---|---|---|---|---|---|---|---|---|
| 1 | Queens Park Rangers (C, P) | 46 | 24 | 16 | 6 | 71 | 32 | +39 | 88 | Promotion to the Premier League |
| 2 | Norwich City (P) | 46 | 23 | 15 | 8 | 83 | 58 | +25 | 84 | Promotion to the Premier League |
| 3 | Swansea City (O, P) | 46 | 24 | 8 | 14 | 69 | 42 | +27 | 80 | Qualification for Championship play-offs |
| 4 | Cardiff City | 46 | 23 | 11 | 12 | 76 | 54 | +22 | 80 | Qualification for Championship play-offs |
| 5 | Reading | 46 | 20 | 17 | 9 | 77 | 51 | +26 | 77 | Qualification for Championship play-offs |
| 6 | Nottingham Forest | 46 | 20 | 15 | 11 | 69 | 50 | +19 | 75 | Qualification for Championship play-offs |
| 7 | Leeds United | 46 | 19 | 15 | 12 | 81 | 70 | +11 | 72 | |
| 8 | Burnley | 46 | 18 | 14 | 14 | 65 | 61 | +4 | 68 | |
| 9 | Millwall | 46 | 18 | 13 | 15 | 62 | 48 | +14 | 67 | |
| 10 | Leicester City | 46 | 19 | 10 | 17 | 76 | 71 | +5 | 67 | |
| 11 | Hull City | 46 | 16 | 17 | 13 | 52 | 51 | +1 | 65 | |
| 12 | Middlesbrough | 46 | 17 | 11 | 18 | 68 | 68 | 0 | 62 | |
| 13 | Ipswich Town | 46 | 18 | 8 | 20 | 62 | 68 | −6 | 62 | |
| 14 | Watford | 46 | 16 | 13 | 17 | 77 | 71 | +6 | 61 | |
| 15 | Bristol City | 46 | 17 | 9 | 20 | 62 | 65 | −3 | 60 | |
| 16 | Portsmouth | 46 | 15 | 13 | 18 | 53 | 60 | −7 | 58 | |
| 17 | Barnsley | 46 | 14 | 14 | 18 | 55 | 66 | −11 | 56 | |
| 18 | Coventry City | 46 | 14 | 13 | 19 | 54 | 58 | −4 | 55 | |
| 19 | Derby County | 46 | 13 | 10 | 23 | 58 | 71 | −13 | 49 | |
| 20 | Crystal Palace | 46 | 12 | 12 | 22 | 44 | 69 | −25 | 48 | |
| 21 | Doncaster Rovers | 46 | 11 | 15 | 20 | 55 | 81 | −26 | 48 | |
| 22 | Preston North End (R) | 46 | 10 | 12 | 24 | 54 | 79 | −25 | 42 | Relegation to Football League One |
| 23 | Sheffield United (R) | 46 | 11 | 9 | 26 | 44 | 79 | −35 | 42 | Relegation to Football League One |
| 24 | Scunthorpe United (R) | 46 | 12 | 6 | 28 | 43 | 87 | −44 | 42 | Relegation to Football League One |

Updated to match(es) played on 7 May 2011. Source: The Football League
Rules for classification: 1) points; 2) goal difference; 3) number of goals scored.
(C) Champions; (O) Play-off winners; (P) Promoted; (R) Relegated

Leading goalscorer Danny Graham (Watford) – 24

=== Football League One ===
Brighton and Hove Albion gave their old Withdean Stadium a memorable send-off as they dominated the division for nearly the whole season and won the League One title, ensuring that the new Falmer Stadium would open to Championship football. Fellow south coast club Southampton, whose promotion challenge had been derailed by a ten-point administration penalty in the previous season, were promoted at the second time of asking, finishing as runners-up. At first, they didn't look like promotion chasers when Alan Pardew was sacked in early September and replaced by Nigel Adkins. But Adkins gave Saints fans what they wanted for years; attacking football and a 2nd-place finish. Peterborough United, who were the top scorers in any of the top four divisions, won the play-offs and clinched an immediate return to the Championship after the previous year's relegation. It meant that manager Darren Ferguson – who had left the Posh 2 years ago – had achieved his third successive promotion with the club.

Swindon Town suffered a shock relegation: having been runners-up in the play-off final the previous season, they struggled for the entire campaign and were eventually relegated in bottom place after the departures of strike-duo Billy Paynter and Charlie Austin. Plymouth Argyle suffered their second successive relegation, the loss of ten points for entering administration proving fatal. Bristol Rovers, who had been promoted alongside Swindon in 2007, were relegated with them this year. Dagenham & Redbridge battled until the final day of the season, but ultimately suffered relegation in their first-ever season at this level. Coincidentally, had it not been for Plymouth's points deduction then Walsall would have been relegated, meaning that three of the four clubs promoted from League Two at the end of the 2006–07 season would have gone down together.

| Pos | Team | Pld | W | D | L | GF | GA | GD | Pts | Promotion, qualification or relegation |
|---|---|---|---|---|---|---|---|---|---|---|
| 1 | Brighton & Hove Albion (C, P) | 46 | 28 | 11 | 7 | 85 | 40 | +45 | 95 | Promotion to Football League Championship |
| 2 | Southampton (P) | 46 | 28 | 8 | 10 | 86 | 38 | +48 | 92 | Promotion to Football League Championship |
| 3 | Huddersfield Town | 46 | 25 | 12 | 9 | 77 | 48 | +29 | 87 | Qualification for League One play-offs |
| 4 | Peterborough United (O, P) | 46 | 23 | 10 | 13 | 106 | 75 | +31 | 79 | Qualification for League One play-offs |
| 5 | Milton Keynes Dons | 46 | 23 | 8 | 15 | 67 | 60 | +7 | 77 | Qualification for League One play-offs |
| 6 | Bournemouth | 46 | 19 | 14 | 13 | 75 | 54 | +21 | 71 | Qualification for League One play-offs |
| 7 | Leyton Orient | 46 | 19 | 13 | 14 | 71 | 62 | +9 | 70 | |
| 8 | Exeter City | 46 | 20 | 10 | 16 | 66 | 73 | −7 | 70 | |
| 9 | Rochdale | 46 | 18 | 14 | 14 | 63 | 55 | +8 | 68 | |
| 10 | Colchester United | 46 | 16 | 14 | 16 | 57 | 63 | −6 | 62 | |
| 11 | Brentford | 46 | 17 | 10 | 19 | 55 | 62 | −7 | 61 | |
| 12 | Carlisle United | 46 | 16 | 11 | 19 | 60 | 62 | −2 | 59 | |
| 13 | Charlton Athletic | 46 | 15 | 14 | 17 | 62 | 66 | −4 | 59 | |
| 14 | Yeovil Town | 46 | 16 | 11 | 19 | 56 | 66 | −10 | 59 | |
| 15 | Sheffield Wednesday | 46 | 16 | 10 | 20 | 67 | 67 | 0 | 58 | |
| 16 | Hartlepool United | 46 | 15 | 12 | 19 | 47 | 65 | −18 | 57 | |
| 17 | Oldham Athletic | 46 | 13 | 17 | 16 | 53 | 60 | −7 | 56 | |
| 18 | Tranmere Rovers | 46 | 15 | 11 | 20 | 53 | 60 | −7 | 56 | |
| 19 | Notts County | 46 | 14 | 8 | 24 | 46 | 60 | −14 | 50 | |
| 20 | Walsall | 46 | 12 | 12 | 22 | 56 | 75 | −19 | 48 | |
| 21 | Dagenham & Redbridge (R) | 46 | 12 | 11 | 23 | 52 | 70 | −18 | 47 | Relegation to Football League Two |
| 22 | Bristol Rovers (R) | 46 | 11 | 12 | 23 | 48 | 82 | −34 | 45 | Relegation to Football League Two |
| 23 | Plymouth Argyle (R) | 46 | 15 | 7 | 24 | 51 | 74 | −23 | 42 (Note: Plymouth Argyle deducted 10 points for insolvency.) | Relegation to Football League Two |
| 24 | Swindon Town (R) | 46 | 9 | 14 | 23 | 50 | 72 | −22 | 41 | Relegation to Football League Two |

Updated to match(es) played on 2 May 2011. Source: BBC
Rules for classification: 1) points; 2) goal difference; 3) number of goals scored.
(C) Champions; (O) Play-off winners; (P) Promoted; (R) Relegated
Notes:

Leading goalscorer: Craig Mackail-Smith (Peterborough United) – 27

=== Football League Two ===
Chesterfield enjoyed a dream start to life at their new stadium, winning the title. Runners-up were Bury, who had been in impressive form for most of the season and secured second place with a blistering late run of form under new manager Richard Barker, even threatening to overtake Chesterfield in the final weeks of the season. Wycombe Wanderers were the final automatically promoted team, making an immediate return to League One after being relegated the previous season. Stevenage won the play-offs and earned promotion in their first ever Football League season.

Stockport suffered their second successive relegation, with continued financial problems and the worst defensive record in the whole Football League costing them dearly. Barnet escaped relegation on the last day of the season with a 1–0 win over Port Vale at Underhill, and along with Lincoln City losing 3–0 to Aldershot, condemned Lincoln to their second relegation from the Football League. They had looked safe with two months to go, but an appalling run, with only two points gained from their last eleven matches saw them dumped into the relegation zone on the last day (their first relegation from the League in 1987 occurred under nearly identical circumstances).

Promoted from the Football Conference as champions were Crawley Town, who entered the Football League for the first time in their history. Also promoted (via the play-offs) were AFC Wimbledon, who were technically also newcomers to the League, but widely seen as the continuation of the original Wimbledon, who became the Milton Keynes Dons at the start of the 2004–05 season.

| Pos | Team | Pld | W | D | L | GF | GA | GD | Pts | Promotion, qualification or relegation |
|---|---|---|---|---|---|---|---|---|---|---|
| 1 | Chesterfield (C, P) | 46 | 24 | 14 | 8 | 85 | 51 | +34 | 86 | Promotion to League One |
| 2 | Bury (P) | 46 | 23 | 12 | 11 | 82 | 50 | +32 | 81 | Promotion to League One |
| 3 | Wycombe Wanderers (P) | 46 | 22 | 14 | 10 | 69 | 50 | +19 | 80 | Promotion to League One |
| 4 | Shrewsbury Town | 46 | 22 | 13 | 11 | 72 | 49 | +23 | 79 | Qualification to League Two play-offs |
| 5 | Accrington Stanley | 46 | 18 | 19 | 9 | 73 | 55 | +18 | 73 | Qualification to League Two play-offs |
| 6 | Stevenage (O, P) | 46 | 18 | 15 | 13 | 62 | 45 | +17 | 69 | Qualification to League Two play-offs |
| 7 | Torquay United | 46 | 17 | 18 | 11 | 74 | 53 | +21 | 68 (Note: Torquay United deducted one point and Hereford United deducted three points) | Qualification to League Two play-offs |
| 8 | Gillingham | 46 | 17 | 17 | 12 | 67 | 57 | +10 | 68 | |
| 9 | Rotherham United | 46 | 17 | 15 | 14 | 75 | 60 | +15 | 66 | |
| 10 | Crewe Alexandra | 46 | 18 | 11 | 17 | 87 | 65 | +22 | 65 | |
| 11 | Port Vale | 46 | 17 | 14 | 15 | 54 | 49 | +5 | 65 | |
| 12 | Oxford United | 46 | 17 | 12 | 17 | 58 | 60 | −2 | 63 | |
| 13 | Southend United | 46 | 16 | 13 | 17 | 62 | 56 | +6 | 61 | |
| 14 | Aldershot Town | 46 | 14 | 19 | 13 | 54 | 54 | 0 | 61 | |
| 15 | Macclesfield Town | 46 | 14 | 13 | 19 | 59 | 73 | −14 | 55 | |
| 16 | Northampton Town | 46 | 11 | 19 | 16 | 63 | 71 | −8 | 52 | |
| 17 | Cheltenham Town | 46 | 13 | 13 | 20 | 56 | 77 | −21 | 52 | |
| 18 | Bradford City | 46 | 15 | 7 | 24 | 43 | 68 | −25 | 52 | |
| 19 | Burton Albion | 46 | 12 | 15 | 19 | 56 | 70 | −14 | 51 | |
| 20 | Morecambe | 46 | 13 | 12 | 21 | 54 | 73 | −19 | 51 | |
| 21 | Hereford United | 46 | 12 | 17 | 17 | 50 | 66 | −16 | 50 | |
| 22 | Barnet | 46 | 12 | 12 | 22 | 58 | 77 | −19 | 48 | |
| 23 | Lincoln City (R) | 46 | 13 | 8 | 25 | 45 | 81 | −36 | 47 | Relegation to Conference National |
| 24 | Stockport County (R) | 46 | 9 | 14 | 23 | 48 | 96 | −48 | 41 | Relegation to Conference National |

Updated to match(es) played on 28 May 2011. Source: The Football League
Rules for classification: 1) points; 2) goal difference; 3) number of goals scored.
(C) Champions; (O) Play-off winners; (P) Promoted; (R) Relegated
Notes:

Leading goalscorer: Clayton Donaldson (Crewe Alexandra) – 28

== Women's football ==
=== Women's Super League ===
| Pos | Team | Pld | W | D | L | GF | GA | GD | Pts | Qualification |
|---|---|---|---|---|---|---|---|---|---|---|
| 1 | Arsenal (C) | 14 | 10 | 2 | 2 | 29 | 9 | +20 | 32 | Qualification for the Champions League knockout phase |
| 2 | Birmingham City | 14 | 8 | 5 | 1 | 29 | 13 | +16 | 29 | Qualification for the Champions League knockout phase |
| 3 | Everton | 14 | 7 | 4 | 3 | 19 | 13 | +6 | 25 | |
| 4 | Lincoln | 14 | 6 | 3 | 5 | 18 | 16 | +2 | 21 | |
| 5 | Bristol Academy | 14 | 4 | 4 | 6 | 14 | 20 | −6 | 16 | |
| 6 | Chelsea | 14 | 4 | 3 | 7 | 14 | 19 | −5 | 15 | |
| 7 | Doncaster Rovers Belles | 14 | 2 | 3 | 9 | 9 | 26 | −17 | 9 | |
| 8 | Liverpool | 14 | 1 | 4 | 9 | 10 | 26 | −16 | 7 | |

Source: FA WSL results
Rules for classification: 1) Points; 2) Goal difference; 3) Number of goals scored
(C) Champions

=== Women's Premier League ===
==== National Division ====
| Pos | Team | Pld | W | D | L | GF | GA | GD | Pts | Qualification or relegation |
|---|---|---|---|---|---|---|---|---|---|---|
| 1 | Sunderland (C) | 14 | 9 | 3 | 2 | 30 | 16 | +14 | 30 | |
| 2 | Nottingham Forest | 14 | 6 | 5 | 3 | 19 | 16 | +3 | 23 | |
| 3 | Reading | 14 | 6 | 2 | 6 | 24 | 21 | +3 | 20 | |
| 4 | Leeds United | 14 | 5 | 3 | 6 | 17 | 17 | 0 | 18 | |
| 5 | Barnet | 14 | 4 | 4 | 6 | 20 | 22 | −2 | 16 | |
| 6 | Watford | 14 | 3 | 7 | 4 | 21 | 26 | −5 | 16 | |
| 7 | Blackburn Rovers (R) | 14 | 4 | 4 | 6 | 18 | 24 | −6 | 16 | Relegation to the Northern Division |
| 8 | Millwall Lionesses (R) | 14 | 3 | 4 | 7 | 22 | 29 | −7 | 13 | Relegation to the Southern Division |

Updated to match(es) played on 17 May 2012. Source: FA WPL
Rules for classification: 1) points; 2) goal difference; 3) number of goals scored.
(C) Champions; (R) Relegated

==== Northern Division ====
| Pos | Team | Pld | W | D | L | GF | GA | GD | Pts | Promotion or relegation |
|---|---|---|---|---|---|---|---|---|---|---|
| 1 | Aston Villa (C, P) | 18 | 14 | 0 | 4 | 40 | 18 | +22 | 42 | Promotion to the National Division |
| 2 | Coventry City (P) | 18 | 13 | 2 | 3 | 45 | 22 | +23 | 41 | Promotion to the National Division |
| 3 | Leicester City | 18 | 12 | 1 | 5 | 59 | 20 | +39 | 37 | |
| 4 | Manchester City | 18 | 12 | 1 | 5 | 37 | 18 | +19 | 37 | |
| 5 | Derby County | 18 | 8 | 3 | 7 | 27 | 28 | −1 | 27 | |
| 6 | Leeds City Vixens | 18 | 5 | 2 | 11 | 31 | 46 | −15 | 17 | |
| 7 | Rochdale | 18 | 5 | 1 | 12 | 36 | 57 | −21 | 16 | |
| 8 | Preston North End | 18 | 4 | 3 | 11 | 22 | 46 | −24 | 15 | |
| 9 | Newcastle United (R) | 18 | 4 | 3 | 11 | 22 | 48 | −26 | 15 | Relegation to Northern Combination League |
| 10 | Curzon Ashton (R) | 18 | 3 | 4 | 11 | 22 | 38 | −16 | 13 | Relegation to Midland Combination League |

Updated to match(es) played on 17 May 2012. Source: FA WPL
Rules for classification: 1) points; 2) goal difference; 3) number of goals scored.
(C) Champions; (P) Promoted; (R) Relegated

==== Southern Division ====
| Pos | Team | Pld | W | D | L | GF | GA | GD | Pts | Promotion or relegation |
|---|---|---|---|---|---|---|---|---|---|---|
| 1 | Charlton Athletic (C, P) | 18 | 11 | 3 | 4 | 30 | 12 | +18 | 36 | Promotion to the National Division |
| 2 | Cardiff City (P) | 18 | 11 | 3 | 4 | 26 | 19 | +7 | 36 | Promotion to the National Division |
| 3 | West Ham United | 18 | 10 | 3 | 5 | 29 | 17 | +12 | 33 | |
| 4 | Portsmouth | 18 | 10 | 1 | 7 | 33 | 30 | +3 | 31 | |
| 5 | Keynsham Town | 18 | 9 | 3 | 6 | 26 | 22 | +4 | 30 | |
| 6 | Colchester United | 18 | 6 | 3 | 9 | 22 | 23 | −1 | 21 | |
| 7 | Brighton & Hove Albion | 18 | 5 | 4 | 9 | 25 | 35 | −10 | 19 | |
| 8 | Queens Park Rangers | 18 | 5 | 3 | 10 | 16 | 26 | −10 | 18 | |
| 9 | Gillingham | 18 | 5 | 2 | 11 | 17 | 27 | −10 | 17 | |
| 10 | Yeovil Town (R) | 18 | 3 | 5 | 10 | 18 | 31 | −13 | 14 | Relegation to the South West Combination League |

Updated to match(es) played on 17 May 2012. Source: FA WPL
Rules for classification: 1) points; 2) goal difference; 3) number of goals scored.
(C) Champions; (P) Promoted; (R) Relegated

=== FA Women's Cup ===
==== Final ====
21 May 2011
15:00 BST

| Arsenal | 2–0 | Bristol Academy |
|---|---|---|
| Little 19'; Fleeting 32' | Report |

Ricoh Arena, Coventry
Attendance: 13,885
Referee: Sian Massey

=== FA WSL Cup ===
==== Final ====
25 September 2011
14:15 BST

| Arsenal | 4–1 | Birmingham City |
|---|---|---|
| White 26'; Ludlow 27'; Yankey 70', 84' | Report | Williams 72' |

Pirelli Stadium, Burton-on-Trent
Attendance: 2,167
Referee: Saša Ihringová

== England national football team ==
=== Euro 2012 qualification ===
During the season, the England national football team played the first five of their eight scheduled Group G qualifying matches for Euro 2012.

| 3 September 2010 | England | 4–0 | Bulgaria | Wembley Stadium, London |
| 20:00 BST | Defoe 3', 61', 86'; A. Johnson 83' | Report | | Attendance: 73,246; Referee: Viktor Kassai (Hungary) |

| 7 September 2010 | Switzerland | 1–3 | England | St. Jakob Park, Basel |
| 19:45 BST | Shaqiri 71' | Report | Rooney 10'; A. Johnson 69'; Bent 88' | Attendance: 39,700; Referee: Nicola Rizzoli (Italy) |

| 12 October 2010 | England | 0–0 | Montenegro | Wembley Stadium, London |
| 20:00 BST | | Report | | Attendance: 73,451; Referee: Manuel Grafe (Germany) |

| 26 March 2011 | Wales | 0–2 | England | Millennium Stadium, Cardiff |
| 15:00 GMT | | Report | Lampard 7' (pen.); Bent 14' | Attendance: 68,959; Referee: Olegario Benquerenca (Portugal) |

| 4 June 2011 | England | 2–2 | Switzerland | Wembley Stadium, London |
| | Lampard 37' (pen.); Young 51' | Report | Barnetta 32', 35' | Attendance: 84,459 |

=== Friendlies ===
England also participated in a number of friendly matches.

| 11 August 2010 | England | 2–1 | Hungary | Wembley Stadium, London |
| 20:00 BST | Gerrard 69', 73' | Report | Jagielka 63' (o.g.) | Attendance: 72,024; Referee: Stéphane Lannoy (France) |

| 17 November 2010 | England | 1–2 | France | Wembley Stadium, London |
| 21:00 CET | Crouch 82' | Report | Benzema 16'; Valbuena 55' | Attendance: 85,495; Referee: Claus Bo Larsen (Denmark) |

| 9 February 2011 | Denmark | 1–2 | England | Parken, Copenhagen |
| | Agger 8' | Report | Bent 10'; Young 68' | Attendance: 21,523; Referee: Jonas Eriksson (Sweden) |

| 29 March 2011 | England | 1–1 | Ghana | Wembley Stadium, London |
| 20:00 BST | Carroll 43' | | Gyan 90+1' | Attendance: 80,102; Referee: Cüneyt Çakır (Turkey) |

== English clubs' performance in Europe ==
These are the results of the English teams in European competitions during the 2010–11 season. (English team score displayed first)

| Team | Contest and round | Opponent | 1st leg score* | 2nd leg score** | Aggregate score |
|---|---|---|---|---|---|
| Manchester United | Champions League Group Phase | (Spain) Valencia | 1–1 | 1–0 | None |
| Manchester United | Champions League Group Phase | (Scotland) Rangers | 0–0 | 1–0 | None |
| Manchester United | Champions League Group Phase | (Turkey) Bursaspor | 1–0 | 3–0 | None |
| Manchester United | Champions League Round of 16 | (France) Marseille | 0–0 (A) | 2–1 (H) | W 2–1 |
| Manchester United | Champions League Quarter Final | (England) Chelsea | 1–0 (A) | 2–1 (H) | W 3–1 |
| Manchester United | Champions League Semi-final | (Germany) Schalke 04 | 2–0 (A) | 4–1 (H) | W 6–1 |
| Manchester United | Champions League Final | (Spain) Barcelona | 1–3 (N) | None | L 1–3 |
| Chelsea | Champions League Group Phase | (France) Olympique Marseille | 2–0 | 0–1 | None |
| Chelsea | Champions League Group Phase | (Russia) FC Spartak Moscow | 4–1 | 2–0 | None |
| Chelsea | Champions League Group Phase | (Slovakia) MŠK Žilina | 2–1 | 4–1 | None |
| Chelsea | Champions League Round of 16 | (Denmark) Copenhagen | 2–0 (A) | 0–0 (H) | W 2–0 |
| Chelsea | Champions League Quarter Final | (England) Manchester United | 0–1 (H) | 1–2 (A) | L 1–3 |
| Arsenal | Champions League Group Phase | (Serbia) Partizan Belgrade | 3–1 | 3–1 | None |
| Arsenal | Champions League Group Phase | (Ukraine) Shakhtar Donetsk | 5–1 | 1–2 | None |
| Arsenal | Champions League Group Phase | (Portugal) Braga | 6–0 | 0–2 | None |
| Arsenal | Champions League Round of 16 | (Spain) Barcelona | 2–1 (H) | 1–3 (A) | L 3–4 |
| Tottenham Hotspur | Champions League Playoff Round | (Switzerland) BSC Young Boys | 2–3 (A) | 4–0 (H) | W 6–3 |
| Tottenham Hotspur | Champions League Group Phase | (Italy) Inter Milan | 3–4 | 3–1 | None |
| Tottenham Hotspur | Champions League Group Phase | (Germany) SV Werder Bremen | 3–0 | 2–2 | None |
| Tottenham Hotspur | Champions League Group Phase | (Netherlands) FC Twente | 4–1 | 3–3 | None |
| Tottenham Hotspur | Champions League Round of 16 | (Italy) A.C. Milan | 1–0 (A) | 0–0 (H) | W 1–0 |
| Tottenham Hotspur | Champions League Quarter Final | (Spain) Real Madrid | 0–4 (A) | 0–1 (H) | L 0–5 |
| Manchester City | Europa League Playoff Round | (Romania) FC Timişoara | 1–0 (A) | 2–0 (H) | W 3–0 |
| Manchester City | Europa League Group Phase | (Italy) Juventus | 1–1 | 1–1 | None |
| Manchester City | Europa League Group Phase | (Poland) Lech Poznań | 3–1 | 1–3 | None |
| Manchester City | Europa League Group Phase | (Austria) Red Bull Salzburg | 3–0 | 2–0 | None |
| Manchester City | Europa League Round of 32 | (Greece) Aris | 0–0 (A) | 3–0 (H) | W 3–0 |
| Manchester City | Europa League Round of 16 | (Ukraine) Dynamio Kyiv | 0–2 (A) | 1–0 (H) | L 1–2 |
| Aston Villa | Europa League Playoff Round | (Austria) SK Rapid Wien | 1–1 (A) | 2–3 (H) | L 3–4 |
| Liverpool | Europa League 3rd Qual. Round | (North Macedonia) FK Rabotnički | 2–0 (A) | 2–0 (H) | W 4–0 |
| Liverpool | Europa League Playoff Round | (Turkey) Trabzonspor | 1–0 (H) | 2–1 (A) | W 3–1 |
| Liverpool | Europa League Group Phase | (Italy) Napoli | 3–1 | 0–0 | None |
| Liverpool | Europa League Group Phase | (Romania) Steaua București | 4–1 | 1–1 | None |
| Liverpool | Europa League Group Phase | (Netherlands) Utrecht | 0–0 | 0–0 | None |
| Liverpool | Europa League Round of 32 | (Czech Republic) Sparta Prague | 0–0 (A) | 1–0 (H) | W 1–0 |
| Liverpool | Europa League Round of 16 | (Portugal) Braga | 0–1 (A) | 0–0 (H) | L 0–1 |

* For group games in Champions League or Europa League, score in home game is displayed
** For group games in Champions League or Europa League, score in away game is displayed
