= CLE =

CLE or Cle may refer to:

== Places ==
=== United States ===
- A common abbreviation for the U.S. city of Cleveland, Ohio and the city's major professional sports teams:
  - Cleveland Guardians, the city's Major League Baseball team
  - Cleveland Browns, the city's National Football League team
  - Cleveland Cavaliers, the city's National Basketball Association team

== Science and technology ==
- Chemical Langevin equation, a stochastic ordinary differential equation
- Conformal loop ensemble, a conformally invariant collection of fractal loops which models interfaces in two-dimensional statistical physics
- Chu–Liu/Edmonds algorithm, an algorithm for finding optimal branchings in graph theory
- Current-limiting element, a fuse designed to limit current in power systems

=== Medicine ===
- Clear lens extraction, a surgical procedure to correct refractive errors
- Congenital lobar emphysema
- Continuous lumbar epidural infusion, a common type of epidural anesthesia
- Leukoencephalopathy with vanishing white matter

== Organizations ==
- Cleveland Weather Forecast Office, of the U.S. National Weather Service
- Central Landing Establishment,
- Claire's (stock symbol), a retailer of accessories, jewelry, and toys

== People ==
People with the name Cle (or Clé) include:

- Clé Bennett, Canadian television, film, and stage actor
- Cle Jeltes (1924–2010), Dutch sailor and Olympic measurer
- Cle Newhook (1943–2018), Canadian theologian, author and politician
- Cle Shaheed Sloan (born 1963), American activist, actor and documentary director
- Clé (footballer) (born 1997), Euclides Tavares Andrade, Cape Verdean footballer

== Transport ==
- Clementi MRT station (MRT station abbreviation)
- Cleveland Hopkins International Airport (IATA airport code)

== Other uses ==
- Canadian Lakehead Exhibition, in Thunder Bay, Ontario, Canada
- Consistent life ethic, an ideology opposing abortion, capital punishment, and assisted suicide
- Continuing legal education, the professional education of lawyers that takes place after their initial admission to the bar
- Clé, a collection of albums by South Korean boy band Stray Kids
- Mercedes-Benz CLE
