= Elizabeth Young =

Elizabeth Young may refer to:

- Elizabeth Young, Baroness Kennet (1923–2014), British writer
- Elizabeth Young (actress) (1913–2007), American film actress of the 1930s
- Elizabeth Young (author), chick lit and contemporary romance writer
- Elizabeth Young (contralto) (1730s–1773), English opera singer and actress
- Elizabeth Young (journalist) (1950–2001), English literary critic and author
- Elizabeth Younge (1740–1797), English actress
- Liz Young (golfer) (born 1982), English golfer

== See also ==
- Sally Blane (born Elizabeth Jane Young; 1910–1997), American actress
- Eliza R. Snow (1804–1887), American Latter-day Saint, a plural wife of Brigham Young
- Beth Young, a fictional character on Desperate Housewives
- Betty Young, American educator
- Betty Lou Young, American writer and conservationist
- Liz Young (1958–2020), American artist
- John Quincy Adams and Elizabeth Young House, in Washington County, Oregon
