= Arthur L. Williams =

Arthur L. Williams may refer to:

- Arthur Leonard Williams (politician) (1904–1972), British politician and Governor General of Mauritius
- Arthur Llewellyn Williams (1856–1919), Episcopal bishop
- Arthur L. Williams Jr. (born 1942), billionaire insurance executive

== See also ==
- Arthur Williams (disambiguation)
