= Estaba =

Estaba is a Spanish-language surname. Notable people with the surname include:

- Francisco Alarcón Estaba (born 1950), Venezuelan writer and poet
- Gabriel Estaba (born 1965), Venezuelan basketball player
- Luis Estaba (1938–2025), Venezuelan boxer
- Magalvi Estaba (born 1957), Venezuelan politician
