= Macdonald Commission =

Royal Commission on the Economic Union and Development Prospects for Canada
- Also known as: Macdonald Commission
- Commissioners: Donald S. Macdonald (Chair); Clarence Barber; Albert Breton; Laurent Picard; Angela Cantwell-Peters; E. Gérard Docquier; William McLean Hamilton; John Rissler Messer; J. J. Michel Robert; Daryl Seaman; Thomas Shoyama; Jean Casselman Wadds; Catherine T. Wallace
- Inquiry period: November 5, 1982 – August 1985
- Authorized: Order in Council P.C. 1982-3438

The Royal Commission on the Economic Union and Development Prospects for Canada, also known as the Macdonald Commission, was a historic landmark in Canadian economy policy. Prime Minister Pierre Trudeau appointed the Royal Commission in 1982, and it presented its recommendations to Prime Minister Brian Mulroney in 1984. The commission's recommendations reflect three broad themes mainly derived from neoconservative ideology.

Firstly, the report suggested for Canada to foster a more flexible economy, which would be capable of adjusting to international and technological change, and it recommended greater reliance on the market mechanisms and a free trade agreement with the United States. Secondly, the commission recommended various reforms to the welfare state model and emphasized social equity and economic efficiency. Thirdly, the commission recommended the adoption of an elected Senate in order to better represent Canada's diverse regions.

Most notably, the commission’s recommendations affected trade policy directly by giving greater legitimacy and momentum to the debate surrounding free trade with the United States. Mulroney began trade negotiations with the American administration shortly after the report was released. Indeed, free trade is regarded as the signature recommendation of the commission.

== Members ==
- Chair – Donald S. Macdonald
- Executive Director – Gerry Godsoe
- Director of Policy – Alan Nymark
- Directors of Research – Ivan Bernier, Alan Cairns, and David Chadwick Smith (Later, Kenneth Norrie and John Hartley Sargent took on the roles of co-Directors of Research).
- Joint Editorial Head – David Ablett and Michel Vastel.
