= Kenneth Norrie =

Canadian economic historian

Kenneth Harold Norrie
- Born: 1946 (age 79–80); Saskatoon, Saskatchewan, Canada

Academic background
- Education: University of Saskatchewan; Yale University

Academic work
- Main interests: economy of Western Canada
- Notable works: MacDonald Commission research

Kenneth Harold Norrie (born 1946) is a Canadian economic historian specializing in the economy of Western Canada at the turn of the century.

Born in Saskatoon, Saskatchewan, Norrie received his undergraduate degree from the University of Saskatchewan and his PhD from Yale University. He spent much of his career at the University of Alberta, serving as chair of the Department of Economics and then as dean of the Faculty of Arts (1999–2001). He was provost of McMaster University from January 1, 2002, succeeding psychologist Harvey Weingarten who had left to become president of the University of Calgary. On September 22, 2006, Norrie suddenly resigned the provost position and resumed teaching and research activities as a member of the Faculty of Social Science. Since then he has been appointed as Vice-President (Research) of the Higher Education Quality Council of Ontario.

Norrie is perhaps best known for his work with prairie wheat farming. He was a key researcher for the MacDonald Commission of the early 1980s, which recommended signing the Canadian-American Free Trade Agreement.

== Publications ==
The National Policy and Prairie Economic Discrimination, 1870–1930
