= Gerry Godsoe =

J. Gerald "Gerry" Godsoe (died April 1996) LL.B, QC, and Rhodes Scholar, was a Canadian lawyer, former executive director of the MacDonald Commission and president and CEO of Nova Scotia Power.

Godsoe was a frequent advisor to governments, both provincially and federally. In the 1970s, he advised on energy policies for his home province of Nova Scotia. In the 1980s, he was a special advisor and counsel to the federal government of Canada on offshore mineral rights and the Canadian constitution. He is most well known for being the executive director of the MacDonald Commission, which set the agenda for economic policy in Canada for years to come. In particular, it paved the way for free trade negotiations between Canada and the United States.

He died in Halifax at the age of 54, as a result of complications following treatment for leukemia. His family and Dalhousie University created the J. Gerald Godsoe Scholarship to honour his memory by supporting students with a passion for public policy issues facing Canada.

He was survived by his wife, Dale Godsoe, and their three children, Suzanne, Stacey and Laura.
