= Claire Bazy-Malaurie =

French official

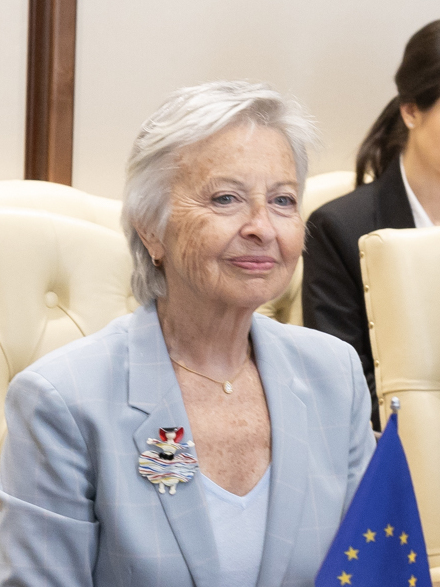

President of the Venice Commission
- In office 10 December 2021 – 16 December 2025

Member of the Constitutional Council
- In office 7 September 2010 – 13 March 2022
- Appointed by: Bernard Accoyer; Claude Bartolone
- President: Jean-Louis Debré; Laurent Fabius
- Preceded by: Jean-Louis Pezant
- Succeeded by: Véronique Malbec

Personal details
- Born: 14 April 1949 (age 77) Paris, France
- Education: Sciences Po, ÉNA

Claire Bazy-Malaurie (born 14 April 1949) is a former member of the Constitutional Council of France. Bazy-Malaurie is president of the Venice Commission since 10 December 2021.
