= Jorge Cepernic =

Argentine politician

Governor of Santa Cruz
- In office 1973–1974
- Preceded by: Fdo. Diego García
- Succeeded by: Augusto Saffores

Personal details
- Born: 23 February 1915; Río Gallegos, Santa Cruz
- Died: 18 July 2010 (aged 95); Río Gallegos, Santa Cruz

Jorge Cepernic (23 February 1915 – 18 July 2010) was an Argentine politician and Governor of Santa Cruz Province between 1973 and 1974.

In 1974, during Isabel Perón's term in office, he was removed from office. Afterwards, he was given a five-year jail sentence at the Magdalena jail for allowing the filming of Rebellion in Patagonia during his tenure in office. He was then forced into house arrest with his family in their farm nearby El Calafate. One day he escaped and managed to arrive to a police station, where he waited for the chief of police and asked him to have him removed from his house arrest and sent to a prison so that his family would not be victims of his sentence.

On 18 July 2010, Jorge died in his house in Río Gallegos after a long illness at the age of 95. The Santa Cruz governor Daniel Peralta declared provincial mourning for three days.
