= Seymour London =

American physician

Seymour B. London (July 1, 1915 – July 14, 2010) was an American physician and inventor who created the first automatic blood pressure monitor.

London was born on July 1, 1915, in Detroit and moved to Miami Beach, Florida as a youth together with his family, where he graduated from Miami Beach Senior High School in 1932. He earned his undergraduate degree at the University of Florida, was awarded a master's degree from the University of Michigan and received his medical degree from Harvard Medical School in 1940. He did an internship in cardiopulmonary medicine at Bellevue Hospital Center, where he met and married Rose Perrone, a fellow medical student. He returned to Miami Beach after completing his medical training and operated a medical practice for 50 years together with his wife, who died in 2008. They helped found the University of Miami Miller School of Medicine and the Miami Heart Institute at Mount Sinai Medical Center.

London developed the automated blood pressure machine after having to spend time on multiple occasions fumbling to take a patient's blood pressure by hand. He created the original prototype of his patented device using an old blood pressure cuff, a column of mercury, a pump from a fish tank and a microphone. To demonstrate the accuracy of their device, London and his wife conducted a double blind study of 400 physicians at the 1965 annual convention of the American Medical Association. The study findings, which demonstrated that there was no statistically significant difference between the results taken automatically and those done by hand, were published in a November 1966 issue of the Journal of the American Medical Association. In addition to a United States patent, the device was also patented in France, Germany and Italy. After his death, his daughter announced plans to donate the original model of the device to the Medical School of the University of Miami.

London died on July 14, 2010, at age 95, at his home in Miami Beach, Florida from heart disease.
