= Ashpan Annie =

Halifax Explosion survivor

Anne Welsh
- Born: Anne Liggins; January 25, 1916; Halifax, Nova Scotia, Canada
- Died: July 18, 2010 (aged 94); Halifax, Nova Scotia, Canada
- Resting place: Mount Olivet Cemetery
- Other name: Ashpan Annie
- Known for: Survivor of the Halifax Explosion

Ashpan Annie (January 25, 1916 – July 18, 2010) was the name given to Anne M. Welsh (née Liggins), a "Halifax Explosion" survivor.

At the time she was 23 months old. Her brother Edwin and mother Anne were killed in the blast, which leveled most of the north Barrington Street structure. She was blown under the kitchen stove, where the still warm ashes in the ashpan kept her alive until she was rescued by a soldier, Sgt Davies, and his dog, along with a neighbour, Mr Henneberry, who was looking for his own family who had lived nearby some 26 hours later.

Her father, Pte Edward, was a soldier who was overseas at the time. She was taken to the Pine Hill Convalescent Hospital, where she was discovered by her grandmother and aunt.

She worked as a laundry worker at a young age, married and raised her own family. Her husband, Angus Welsh, died in the 1990s.

She lived most of her life in the Hydrostone district. She died at The Berkeley, Gladstone Ridge, in Halifax, Nova Scotia.

== Legacy ==
Several songs have been written about her.

- "Ash Pan Annie" - Samantha Gracie
- "Ash Pan Annie" - David Stone and Friends
