= Conformal loop ensemble =

In critical percolation on the honeycomb lattice, each hexagon face is colored red or black independently with equal probability. Every interface separating a black cluster from a red cluster is shown in green. This random collection of interfaces converges in law to CLE_{6} as the lattice spacing goes to zero.

To define a random interface converging to SLE, we fix the colors of the hexagons along the boundary of the domain. This procedure defines a single interface separating red hexagons from black hexagons. This path converges in law to SLE_{6} as the lattice spacing goes to zero.

A conformal loop ensemble (CLE_{κ}) is a random collection of non-crossing loops in a simply connected, open subset of the plane. These random collections of loops are indexed by a parameter κ, which may be any real number between 8/3 and 8. CLE_{κ} is a loop version of the Schramm–Loewner evolution: SLE_{κ} is designed to model a single discrete random interface, while CLE_{κ} models a full collection of interfaces.

In many instances for which there is a conjectured or proved relationship between a discrete model and SLE_{κ}, there is also a conjectured or proved relationship with CLE_{κ}. For example:

- CLE_{3} is the limit of interfaces for the critical Ising model.
- CLE_{4} may be viewed as the 0-set of the Gaussian free field.
- CLE_{16/3} is a scaling limit of cluster interfaces in critical FK Ising percolation.
- CLE_{6} is a scaling limit of critical percolation on the triangular lattice.

== Constructions ==
For 8/3 < κ < 8, CLE_{κ} may be constructed using a branching variation of an SLE_{κ} process. When 8/3 < κ ≤ 4, CLE_{κ} may be alternatively constructed as the collection of outer boundaries of Brownian loop soup clusters.

== Properties ==
CLE_{κ} is conformally invariant, which means that if $\varphi:D\to D'$ is a conformal map, then the law of a CLE in D' is the same as the law of the image of all the CLE loops in D under the map $\varphi$.

Since CLE_{κ} may be defined using an SLE_{κ} process, CLE loops inherit many path properties from SLE. For example, each CLE_{κ} loop is a fractal with almost-sure Hausdorff dimension 1 + κ/8. Each loop is almost surely simple (no self intersections) when 8/3 < κ ≤ 4 and almost surely self-touching when 4 < κ < 8.

The set of all points not surrounded by any loop, which is called the gasket, has Hausdorff dimension 1 + 2/κ + 3κ/32 almost surely (random soups, carpets and fractal dimensions by Nacu and Werner. Since this dimension is strictly greater than 1+κ/8, there are almost surely points not contained in or surrounded by any loop. However, since the gasket dimension is strictly less than 2, almost all points (with respect to area measure) are contained in the interior of a loop.

CLE is sometimes defined to include only the outermost loops, so that the collection of loops is non-nested (no loop is contained in another). Such a CLE is called a simple CLE to distinguish it from a full or nested CLE. The law of a full CLE can be recovered from the law of a simple CLE as follows. Sample a collection of simple CLE loops, and inside each loop sample another collection of simple CLE loops. Infinitely many iterations of this procedure gives a full CLE.
