= Arthur James Williams =

American pilot and aviation pioneer in Guyana

- Known for: a pioneering pilot who helped develop aviation in Guyana

Lt. Col. Arthur "Art" James Williams, USAAF, AAM, OBE was a pilot who helped develop aviation in Guyana, then British Guiana.

He arrived in British Guiana in 1934, flying a Ireland N-2C Neptune amphibian biplane. In 1938, he registered British Guiana Airways Limited. Also known as B.G. Airways, Williams was contracted by the government doing mail delivery and survey work. During World War II volunteered for service, performing anti-submarine patrols until he was called up for military service as Major in the U.S. Air force.

Willams was also advisor for the development of Atkinson Field and many hinterland airstrips.

On April 1, 1942, Major Williams, accompanied by Thomas Persaud, flew into the Orinoco Delta and rescued 20 men from a US Army plane which had lost its way, and had crash-landed on the Venezuelan Coast. In May 1943, when a US C54, which was carrying headquarters staff to China with gold bullion, made a forced landing on the Ituribisi River.

After leaving Guiana, Williams moved to Jupiter, Florida to be with wife Inez and his two children.

The Art Williams & Harry Wendt Aeronautical Engineering School in Guyana was named for Williams in 1993.
