= David Knowles (footballer) =

English footballer

Personal information
- Full name: John David Knowles
- Date of birth: 11 April 1941
- Place of birth: Halifax, England
- Date of death: 26 January 2011 (aged 69)
- Place of death: Brighouse, England
- Position: Goalkeeper

Youth career
- 1958: Halifax Town

Senior career*
| Years | Team | Apps | (Gls) |
| 1958–1964 | Halifax Town | 72 | (0) |
| 1964–1966 | Bury | 1 | (0) |
| 1966–1967 | Bradford City | 21 | (0) |
| Total | | 94 | (0) |
- * Club domestic league appearances and goals

John David Knowles (11 April 1941 – 26 January 2011) was an English professional footballer who played as a goalkeeper. He played for Halifax Town, Bury and Bradford City.

== Career ==
Born in Halifax, in 1941, Knowles attended Clare Hall County Secondary Modern School, playing football for the school side and the Halifax representative side. He joined hometown team Halifax Town at the age of 17 and signed professional forms six months later, going on to make 72 appearances in the Football League over the next six seasons. Knowles later played for Bury, making just one league appearance, before spending a final season with Bradford City. He waited until the third game of the 1966–67 season to make his debut for City, which came against city rivals Bradford (Park Avenue) in a 3–2 defeat, going on to play 21 games.

== Later life and death ==
After retiring as a player, Knowles became postmaster of Oakenshaw. He married Jennifer, with whom he had two children, Heather and Ian. Knowles died on 26 January 2011 at the age of 69, in Elm Royd Nursing Home, Brighouse, following a long illness.
