= Belkisyole Alarcón de Noya =

- Born: 11 January 1952 (age 74); Guanta, Venezuela
- Education: Central University of Venezuela
- Occupation: Physician
- Spouse: Óscar Noya
- Parent(s): Gustavo Alarcón; Lida Marcano de Alarcón
- Awards: 2017 Women in Science Award

Belkisyole Alarcón de Noya (born 11 January 1952) is a Venezuelan physician with a PhD in medical parasitology. She is a pioneer in studies in this area of medicine and she received the 2017 Women in Science Award, granted by the Academy of Physical, Mathematical and Natural Sciences of Venezuela.

== Biography ==
Her parents are Gustavo Alarcón and Lida Marcano de Alarcón and Belkisyole is the oldest of four siblings. She studied elementary education at Colegio La Florida in Caracas, where she received the medal of honor in all primary courses. While she lived in Simón Rodríguez and before that in La Pastora. Starting in 1963, Belkisyole studied high school at Colegio Santo Domingo de Guzmán, where she graduated with a Bachelor of Science degree in 1968. On 20 October 1975 the Noya's graduated as physicians and on 5 September 1975 Belkisyolé and Oscar Noya married.

She and her husband joined the Central University of Venezuela in 1980 to study parasitology, and Belkis graduated from Tulane University, United States, with a PhD Field work constituted much of the work of her first years at the university, among which the epidemiological work of bilharzia in Caraballeda, the antimalarial vaccine project with the Sp f 66, pioneering work in this area, stand out.

Belkisyolé was president of this Scientific Society. In research, the line developed has been epidemiological studies in schistosomiasis and cysticercosis and immunodiagnosis in parasitic diseases. She contributed new elements in diagnosis and basic guidelines for epidemiological work in schistosomiasis and management of selective or mass chemotherapy of communities. Already with 22 years teaching parasitology at the Faculty of the Central University of Venezuela, she alternated classroom teaching, community work, basic research in the laboratory and administrative work as Head of the department. Belkisyolé's perseverance led to the foundation of the National Postgraduate Project in Parasitology in July 1996, which culminated an aspiration of the Venezuelan Parasitology Society. She had just been Head of the Department of Microbiology, Parasitology and Tropical Medicine, combining the integration of undergraduate studies in the area of infectious diseases. She has been the general coordinator of the Faculty of Medicine for over five years, developing academic initiatives of integration in the teaching and learning process between the different schools of the Faculty of Medicine and in the policies of personnel admission.

She received the 2017 Women in Science Award from the Academy of Physical, Mathematical and Natural Sciences of Venezuela.
