= James Forrest (South African cricketer) =

South African cricketer (1921–2010)

Personal information
- Born: 14 December 1921; Ipswich, Suffolk, England
- Died: 4 July 2010 (aged 88); Cape Town, South Africa
- Source: ESPNcricinfo, 8 June 2016

James Forrest (14 December 1921 – 4 July 2010) was a South African cricketer. He played one first-class match for Transvaal in 1952/53.
