= Jean-Louis Pezant =

French official

Member of the Constitutional Council of France
- In office 10 March 2004 – 24 July 2010
- President: Pierre Mazeaud; Jean-Louis Debré
- Preceded by: Michel Ameller
- Succeeded by: Claire Bazy-Malaurie

Personal details
- Born: 5 October 1938 Dun-le-Palestel, France
- Died: 24 July 2010 (aged 71) Paris, France
- Education: Sciences Po

Jean-Louis Pezant (5 October 1938 in Dun-le-Palestel, Creuse – 24 July 2010) was a member of the Constitutional Council of France from 2004 until his death.

== Bibliography ==
- Les Idées Politiques de Waldeck-Rousseau (1962)
- Le Nouveau Statut de Paris : loi du 31 décembre 1975 (1977)
- L'Election des Députés (co-author, 1997)
- L'Assemblée Nationale (co-author, 2007)
