= Freddie Dunkelman =

British ice hockey player

Personal information
- Full name: Frederick Francis Dunkelman
- Born: 5 or 19 February 1920 East Ham, Greater London, England
- Died: 23 July 2010 (aged 90) London, England

Sport
- Sport: Ice hockey

Frederick Francis Dunkelman (5 or 19 February 1920 – 23 July 2010) was a British ice hockey player who competed at the 1948 Winter Olympics. In St. Moritz he was a member of the British team that placed fifth in the ice hockey tournament. He was born in East Ham, Greater London, and was a member of the Harringay Greyhounds. In 1946 he founded Dunkelman & Son Ltd, now known as Dasco Shoe Care, in Battersea to manufacture and sell ice hockey sticks, but moved into the shoe trade in 1950 and to a new location in Desborough in 1969. He retired from the business after 61 years in 2007 and died in his sleep on 23 July 2010.
