= Arthur Williams (footballer) =

Australian rules footballer

Personal information
- Full name: Arthur Williams
- Born: 23 April 1902
- Died: 23 July 1960 (aged 58)
- Original team: Castlemaine

Playing career^{1}
Years	Club	Games (Goals)
1929–1932	Footscray	38 (4)
1933	Fitzroy	3 (0)
Total		41 (4)
- ^{1} Playing statistics correct to the end of 1933.

Arthur Williams (23 April 1902 – 23 July 1960) was an Australian rules footballer who played for the Footscray Football Club and Fitzroy Football Club in the Victorian Football League (VFL).
