= Aurelio Macchi =

Argentine sculptor (1916–2010)

Aurelio Macchi (27 January 1916 – 1 July 2010) was an Argentine sculptor.

== Education and Career ==
He graduated from the Academy of Fine Arts (Academia de Bellas Artes) in 1938, and worked as an assistant to José Fioravanti. Macchi's work was primarily displayed in the United States and Europe, but also the Museo Nacional de Bellas Artes in Buenos Aires incorporated one of his work, only four years before his death. His used mostly wood and metal for his work. In addition to his individual work, he was also a teacher, and greatly influenced several generations of Argentine sculptors. He was granted the Konex Award in 1982 and 2012 (posthumous).
