= Arthur Williams (rugby league) =

Australian rugby league player (1902–1948)

- Arthur 'spider' Williams. 1930

Personal information
- Full name: Arthur Leo Williams
- Born: 8 April 1902 Temora, New South Wales, Australia
- Died: 24 March 1948 (aged 45) Concord, New South Wales, Australia

Playing information
- Position: Centre
Club
Years	Team	Pld	T	G	FG	P
1926–30	St. George	20	11	0	0	33

Arthur Leo Williams (1902–1948) was an Australian rugby league footballer who played in the 1920s and 1930s.

== Career ==
Known by the nickname of 'Spider', Williams played 5 seasons at St. George between 1926 and 1930.

He was later to Captain/Coach the Fairfield A Grade team in the mid 1930s. Arthur Williams was on the wing for Saints on 11 August 1928, the day of the Earl Park Riot, played at Earl Park, Arncliffe.

== War service ==
He later served in World War Two and was based in Oro Bay with his small ships regiment.

Williams died on 24 March 1948 in Concord, New South Wales 15 days before his 46th birthday.
