= Hugo Alarcón =

Chilean footballer (1993–2019)

Personal information
- Full name: Hugo Andrés Alarcón Abarzúa
- Date of birth: 11 January 1993
- Place of birth: Collipulli, Chile
- Date of death: 11 January 2019 (aged 26)
- Place of death: Santiago de Chile
- Height: 1.80 m (5 ft 11 in)
- Position: Striker

Youth career
- 2004–2013: Universidad Católica

Senior career*
Years	Team	Apps	(Gls)
2013–2016	Universidad Católica	0	(0)
2014–2015	→ Deportes La Pintana (loan)	1	(0)
2015–2016	→ Deportes Linares (loan)	24	(6)
2016–2018	Deportes Melipilla	32	(11)
2018	Deportes La Serena	0	(0)
2018–2019	Deportes Iberia	0	(0)
- * Club domestic league appearances and goals as of 31 August 2018

Hugo Andrés Alarcón Abarzúa (11 January 1993 – 11 January 2019) was a Chilean footballer who played as a striker for football club Deportes Iberia.

== Club career ==
Alarcón made his debut at Universidad Católica in 2013 against Palestino which ended in a 0–0 draw. In July 2014 he went on loan to Deportes La Pintana for one year.

== Death ==
Alarcón died on 11 January 2019, his 26th birthday.
