= John Chaston =

British Colonel

- Born: 17 December 1916; Bedwellty, Monmouthshire, Wales
- Died: 20 July 2010 (aged 93); Newport, Pembrokeshire, Wales
- Military career
- Allegiance: United Kingdom
- Branch: British Army
- Service years: 1937–1960
- Rank: Colonel
- Service number: 71593
- Unit: Monmouthshire Regiment
- Commands: 2nd Battalion, Monmouthshire Regiment
- Conflicts: Second World War
- Awards: Commander of the Order of the British Empire; Military Cross; Efficiency Decoration

Colonel Alfred John Chaston CBE MC TD DL (17 December 1916 – 20 July 2010) was a British Army officer and recipient of the Military Cross.

Chaston was born at Bedwellty, Monmouthshire and educated at Monmouth School. He commissioned into the Monmouthshire Regiment as a territorial on 1 May 1937, and in August 1939 was mobilized following the outbreak of the Second World War. On 26 June 1944, Chaston landed in France in command of "C" Company, 2nd Battalion, Monmouthshire Regiment. On 24 September 1944, Chaston organised and led the defence of the village of Voorheide on the Antwerp-Turnhout canal against a considerable German counter-attack. He was awarded the Military Cross for his actions.

In February 1945, during fighting in the Klever Reichswald, he was wounded and invalided home. He rejoined 2 MONS in 1947 as second-in-command and was appointed commanding officer in 1950, serving in that position until 1953. In 1954 he became a Deputy Lieutenant for Monmouthshire. In 1956 Chaston became Deputy Commander, 160th (Wales) Brigade and he served as an Aide-de-Camp to Elizabeth II in 1968. He was Honorary Colonel of the 2nd Battalion, Monmouthshire Regiment from 1959 to 1969, and in December 1980 he was invested as a Commander of the Order of the British Empire.

Chaston served as a member of the Monmouthshire and, subsequently, Wales Territorial, Auxiliary and Volunteer Reserve Association for more than 30 years, acting as chairman from 1974 until 1981.
