= Mariana Alarcón =

Argentine LGBT rights activist (1986–2014)

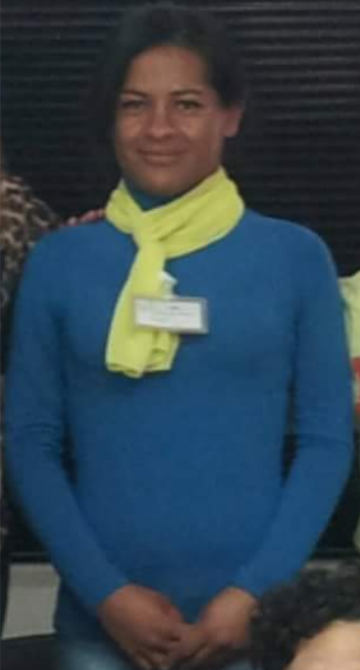
- Born: 20 November 1986; Tucumán Province, Argentina
- Died: 2 August 2014 (aged 27)
- Occupation: Activist

Mariana Alarcón (20 November 1986 – 2 August 2014) was an Argentine human rights activist focused on labor rights for trans women, establishing citizenship, and the health of transgender people. A member of the Crisálida Popular Library of Gender, Sexual Affective Diversity, and Human Rights of Tucumán, she was a pioneer in the public visibility of the trans community in the social sphere of San Miguel de Tucumán. From 2012 to 2014, she conducted training and sensitization of the police forces of Tucumán Province for the full application of the Gender Identity Law.

== Biography ==
Mariana Alarcón was born in Tucumán Province and grew up in the San Miguel neighborhood of Juan XXIII, nicknamed "La Bombilla" for its high rates of social violence. She began to manifest her trans identity at a very young age, enduring discrimination that led her to abandon her studies after finishing primary school.

=== Career ===
In 2011 Alarcón was approached to participate in the Crisálida Popular Library of Gender, Sexual Affective Diversity, and Human Rights of Tucumán. Through Crisálida, she advocated for sanction of the Gender Identity Law project, which was enacted on 24 May 2012 as Law 26.743. Based on this, Alarcón was one of the first transgender people to have access to the correction of identification documents to reflect her gender identity. Beginning in September 2012, she organized a space for more trans people to be advised on the steps to be taken to carry out the process, as well as including applicants from the community in national Employment Management training. In Crisálida she assumed the role of project coordinator for 2013–2014, taking charge of the library's Trans Labor Inclusion Line, where she coordinated education and job training for members of the community. She focused her visibility work on sensitizing society as a trainer, setting up the 2012 to 2016 "Right to Identity" workshop for the Tucumán Security Forces, and teaching the workshop until her death in 2014. She also led the aforementioned workshop at the National University of Tucumán's Faculty of Philosophy and Letters and for the Ombudsman of Tucumán. She also participated in the university volunteering project "Youth, Sexual and Reproductive Rights, and Diversity" (DSyR) and the publication of its results.

== Recognitions ==
After Mariana Alarcón's death in 2014, following the guidelines of Law 26.657 and Law 26.743, an assembly began for articulation of the topics of sexual diversity and gender identities with a mental health perspective. In honor of her work, in 2016 this was designated a Mariana Alarcón Friendly Node, consisting of a First Listening space that provides non-clinical care for the LGBT community, their families, reference groups, and the communities in general. It provides guidance and support to those who attend, promoting links with state services.

== See also ==
- LGBT rights in Argentina
