= Simon Kornblit =

Belgian-American actor (1933–2010)

- Born: August 1, 1933; Antwerp, Belgium
- Died: July 2, 2010 (aged 76); Sandy Springs, Georgia, U.S.
- Spouse: Bobbi
- Children: 2

Simon Kornblit (August 1, 1933 – July 2, 2010) was a Belgian-born American studio executive and actor. Kornblit worked as the Executive Vice President of worldwide marketing for Universal Pictures before pursuing an acting career during retirement.

== Early life and education ==
Simon Kornblit was born to a Jewish family in Antwerp, Belgium, on August 1, 1933. His father, Nathan Kornblit, was a diamond cutter originally from Poland, while his mother, Sonia, was Russian. Kornblit fled the country with his parents and sister, Dora, in 1940, just months before the invasion of Belgium by Nazi Germany. The family escaped to the United States in a cargo ship.

Kornblit settled with his family in New York City, where he graduated from Stuyvesant High School in 1951.

== Career ==
Kornblit began his career in marketing and advertising by working in the mailroom at DDB Worldwide in New York as a summer job in high school. DDB (Doyle Dane Bernbach) had less than 20 employees when Kornblit joined the company, where he would work for 35 years. Kornblit simultaneously attended the School of Commerce and Management at New York University while at DDB. He temporarily left DDB to enlist in the United States Army during the Korean War.

He was gradually promoted within DDB. Kornblit was responsible for managing such advertising accounts as American Tourister's "The Gorilla with the Suitcase" commercial early in his career. He later decided to relocate from New York City to the DDB Worldwide offices in Los Angeles to be closer to his main clients in the entertainment industry, 20th Century Fox and Universal Pictures. He would ultimately become Executive Vice President and general manager of DDB Worldwide in Los Angeles. Kornblit headed the advertising campaign for 20th Century Fox's launch of Star Wars in 1977.

Kornblit left DDB and joined Universal Pictures in 1987. He oversaw the marketing campaigns for the releases of more than 100 films for Universal Pictures from 1987 until 1993, including Field of Dreams (1989), Fried Green Tomatoes (1994) and Jurassic Park (1993). Kornblit was named a voting member of the Academy of Motion Picture Arts and Sciences for the Academy Awards for his work.

=== Later life ===
Kornblit retired from Universal Pictures in 1993. He moved with his wife, Bobbi, to Atlanta in 1994, following the Northridge earthquake to be closer to family in the Southeast. The couple ultimately settled in Sandy Springs, Georgia.

Kornblit quickly became involved with the arts and entertainment industries in Atlanta. He co-founded and developed Kennesaw State University's film institute, also serving as its director from 2001 until 2003. He was a member of the Atlanta Jewish Film Festival's executive committee and co-chaired the High Museum of Art's photo forum. He also served on the board of governors for the Atlanta chapter of the National Academy of Television Arts and Sciences. Kornblit also lectured as a guest professor of film marketing at Georgia State University and the Goizueta Business School at Emory University.

Kornblit decided to become an actor during his early-70s. He trained under Steve Coulter and other Atlanta–area acting coaches. He was able to get a talent agent after just six weeks of study. Kornblit landed roles in local community theater productions, independent films, and television pilots.

== Filmography ==
=== Film ===
Year	Title	Role	Notes
2008	Grandpa for a Night	Grandpa	Short film
2009	Hungry for Love	Hambone's dad	Short film
2010	Revamp	Leo	Short film
2011	Day of Vengeance	Douglas Mason	Short film; also boom operator

=== Television ===
Year	Title	Role	Notes
2007	The Green Room	Upton Drake	Television

== Personal life ==
Simon Kornblit died of acute myeloid leukemia at his home in Sandy Springs on July 2, 2010, at the age of 76.
