= Joe Perrault =

American ski jumper

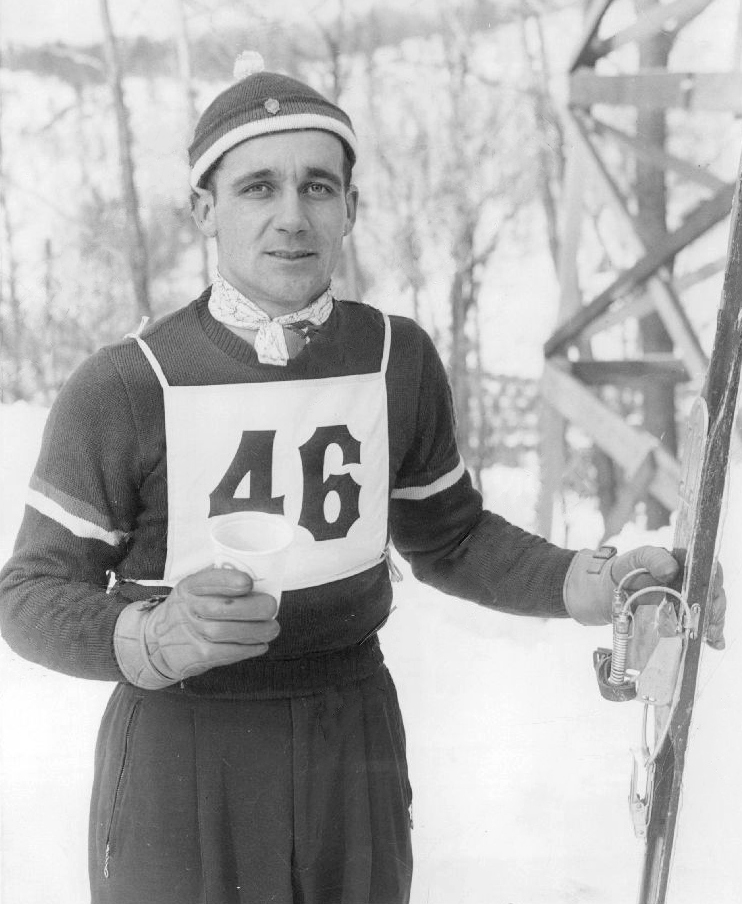
- Perrault in 1949

Personal information
- Born: December 3, 1924 Green Bay, Wisconsin, U.S.
- Died: July 29, 2010 (aged 85) Ishpeming, Michigan, U.S.

Sport
- Sport: Ski jumping
- Club: Ishpeming Ski Club

Paul Joseph Perrault (December 3, 1924 – July 29, 2010) was an American ski jumper. He competed in the normal hill even at the 1948 Winter Olympics and placed 15th. In 1949 he set the North American record at 297 feet (91 m). He would also qualify for the 1952 Winter Olympics, but had to withdraw due to a back injury.

Perrault was born in Green Bay, Wisconsin, later moving to Ishpeming, Michigan. He served in the United States Army during World War II with the 10th Mountain Division based out of Camp Hale in Colorado, earning a Silver Star for his service. He was inducted into the U.S. Ski Jumping Hall of Fame in 1971.
