= David Ablett =

Canadian journalist

David Ablett (4 February 1941 – 24 July 2010) was a Canadian journalist and editor for The Vancouver Sun, the Toronto Star, and other media. He was born in Gibson's Landing, British Columbia, Canada.

Ablett attended the University of British Columbia for his undergraduate studies. At the University of British Columbia he started his journalism career as the editorial page editor of the student newspaper, The Ubyssey. After university, he worked as a journalist at the Vancouver Sun.

In 1965, the Vancouver Sun sent him to Columbia University School of Journalism, where he graduated in 1967 and he was awarded the Pulitzer Prize Traveling Fellowship.

The prize allowed him to spend the next two years abroad - first in Japan, where he worked as a journalist for the Asahi Shimbun, then Europe, where he covered the Soviet invasion of Czechoslovakia for Radio Free Europe.

He returned to the Vancouver Sun in 1969 and became the Washington, and then Ottawa Bureau Chief. He then became the Vancouver Sun's editorial page editor.

In 1977, while at the Vancouver Sun, Ablett won Canada's National Newspaper Award for editorial writing.

Later, he joined the Privy Council for Canada where he served as speech writer and special adviser to Canadian Prime Minister Pierre Elliott Trudeau.

In 1982, Trudeau appointed David to the Royal Commission on the Economic Union and Development Prospects for Canada headed by Donald Stovel Macdonald. David was Joint Editorial Head along with Michel Vastel.

Ablett then went on to work at the Bank of Montreal and then the Bank of Nova Scotia where he became head of Public Affairs. He later joined the editorial board of the Toronto Star.

He eventually finished his career at the Toronto Stock Exchange where he retired as VP of Public and Corporate Affairs in 2007.

David Ablett died on July 24, 2010, in Peterborough, Ontario.
