= Cle Jeltes =

Dutch sailor and measurer (1924–2010)

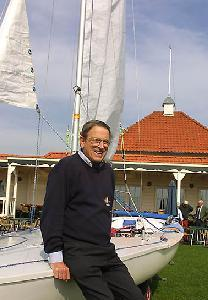
- Jeltes in 2002
- Born: Clemens Henricus Jeltes; 11 March 1924; The Hague, Netherlands
- Died: 3 July 2010 (aged 86); Nederhorst den Berg, Netherlands
- Occupation(s): Sailor, measurer
- Awards: Ridder in de Orde van Oranje Nassau

Clemens Henricus "Clé" Jeltes (11 March 1924 – 3 July 2010) was a Dutch sailor and measurer at seven Olympic games. He was heavily involved with the technical development of the Flying Dutchman and was the driving force to focus at boat measurement to the parameters that really matter. From 1968 until 1992, he was the International FD measurer at seven consecutive Olympic Games, making sure that the sailing took place in correct boats. He was appointed the Ridder in de Orde van Oranje Nassau in 2002 for, among other things, his services to sailing.

Cle Jeltes (left) measuring the East German Flying Dutchman at the 1976 Summer Olympics in Kingston (CAN).
