= Betty Lou Young =

American writer and conservationist

Betty Lou Young (May 18, 1919 – July 1, 2010) was a United States writer and conservationist. Young was born in Minneapolis to Chester Haller, the owner of a lumber warehouse, and his wife Amy, who was a teacher. While Young was still a baby, her parents separated, and her mother relocated in Long Beach. Young received her undergraduate education at UCLA, and her masters at Smith College in 1942, at which point she met and married Thomas Young.

Young became deeply involved in her local community of Rustic Canyon, Los Angeles, writing several books about the Pacific Palisades area. In the 1960s she campaigned to preserve the Santa Monica Mountains against plans for commercial and residential development. Thomas died in 1994, and Young in 2010. They had one son, Thomas R. Young – who collaborated with Betty Lou on some of her books – and two daughters.

== Select publications ==
- Pacific Palisades: Where the Mountains Meet the Sea. Pacific Palisades, Calif: Casa Vieja Press. 2001. ISBN 0-9706409-1-9.
- Rustic Canyon and the Story of the Uplifters. Los Angeles: Hennessey; Ingalls. 1999. ISBN 0-940512-17-3.
- Santa Monica Canyon: A Walk through History. Pacific Palisades, Calif: Casa Vieja Press. 1997. ISBN 0-9706409-0-0.
- Our First Century: The Los Angeles Athletic Club, 1880-1980. Los Angeles: LAAC Press. 1979.
