= Arthur Williams (Elevator Bandit) =

American criminal, born 1946

Arthur Williams (September 26, 1946 – July 11, 2010) was an American career criminal who achieved early notoriety as New York City's "Elevator Bandit", who perpetrated a string of armed robberies in apartment buildings across Manhattan, mostly to support a heroin addiction. Given a three-year term in prison, Williams was released after two years. During the 34 years from 1975 to 2009, Williams spent 33 of those years in prison, with the exception of a two-month period after his release from jail when he went on a drug-fueled crime spree in 1980 that was widely publicized in the media. In 2010, he drove from his home in Alabama to New York City, where he conducted an armed robbery of a Manhattan boutique while using a cane and an oxygen tank and wielding a gun which he fired in the store. On the road back to Alabama, Williams robbed a pair of roadside hotels and then went back on the highway, where a police chase in Maryland ended in his death when he was thrown out of his Cadillac, which he had been driving at 120 miles per hour (190 km/h).

Williams came from a family of ten children and grew up in the Hamilton Heights neighborhood of Manhattan. He variously posed as a doorman, a messenger or a Vietnam War veteran, offering pleasantries before pulling a gun and taking cash and other property from his victims, most frequently in an elevator, earning him the moniker the "Elevator Bandit".

After being paroled from Green Haven Correctional Facility in June 1974 after serving two years of three-year sentence, Williams was arrested the following September and charged with 40 separate holdups, with as many as 100 victims including a deputy United States Attorney and a Legal Aid Society lawyer. In one of the incidents in the spree, Williams dressed as the doorman of an Upper West Side apartment building, greeted residents in the lobby and then robbed them in the elevator. Precincts across Manhattan had reported similar incidents that were traced to Williams. In other crimes, he and a female accomplice, both well dressed, would enter a building and join residents on the elevator, with the woman pulling a gun out of her purse and Williams taking the belongings. Over the objections of prosecutors, New York State Supreme Court Justice James J. Leff sentenced Williams to 10 to 20 years in jail after Williams pleaded guilty to each of the 84 robberies he was charged with. New York County District Attorney Robert M. Morgenthau argued that Williams was a "persistent felony offender" and should have been sentenced to a longer term in prison, but Leff said he would not "be badgered or harassed" and that the 10-year sentence was sufficient, noting that Williams had never physically assaulted any of his victims.

== The final spree ==
He became a preacher while in prison and was released from jail by the New York State Parole Board on July 9, 2009, after telling the board that it would kill him if he committed any more crimes. He moved with his wife to Gadsden, Alabama and lived in a modest home there. A year later, he took a loan from the Family Loan Company and would show up frequently to make payments and interact with the employees there. The company's president recalled that an employee "witnessed to him", which was "not something we do just as a general rule to anybody". On July 1, he came back to Family Loan wearing a bandanna over his face and wielding a gun. After being given cash by a teller, Williams locked three employees in a room. Needing a rest, he took off his cap and bandanna, and was photographed by security cameras. Police were able to get several clear photos of the perpetrator, but Williams never came up as a suspect.

On July 6, 2010, he told his wife that he was going for a dialysis treatment, the last time that his wife would ever see him. Based on a reconstruction of his travels over the next few days, he stopped off at a motel in Knoxville, Tennessee one night and was in Manhattan by the next day, where he had the oil in his Cadillac changed at a garage on 145th Street, near his mother's apartment. The afternoon of July 9, he wore a red shirt and a cap, and entered Serar, a Madison Avenue clothing store located at 46th Street. After asking for a pair of pants to match his jacket, he pulled out a handgun in one hand, while wielding a cane in the other and having an oxygen tank strapped to his body and connected to his nose. A customer in the store ran out, and Williams fired his gun damaging some shelving and a number of suits. Witnesses saw him cross the street to his getaway car, a black Cadillac with Alabama license plates.

Back on the road to Alabama that night, Williams robbed a Super 8 Hotel location in Hancock, Maryland, tying up the desk clerk and his daughter and stealing $580 in cash. He stopped to catch his breath and threatened to shoot his captives after they looked at him with his mask removed. Down the road, he robbed a Sleep Inn located in Clear Spring, Maryland, but the desk clerk there ran away and Williams was unable to find any cash behind the counter. A Maryland State Police officer saw the black Cadillac driving erratically and began a chase. Williams hit 120 mph and went off the road and died of severe head trauma after he, his pistol and his oxygen tank were all thrown from the vehicle.

His 92-year-old mother remembered him as someone who preached and who "really served God. He served him the last 10 or 20 years." A sister called him "a decent person".
