= Wilfredo Alarcón =

Chilean Catholic priest

Personal life
- Born: Carlos Wilfredo Alarcón Ferrada; September 18, 1932 Curacautín, Temuco
- Died: February 7, 2010 (aged 77) Temuco, Chile

Religious life
- Religion: Catholic
- Institute: Missionaries of Charity

Senior posting
- Period in office: 1970–2010

Carlos Wilfredo Alarcón Ferrada (Curacautín, Chile, September 18, 1932 - Temuco, Chile, July 2, 2010) was a Chilean Catholic priest. He was imprisoned, tortured, and survived an attempted execution by agents of Augusto Pinochet's dictatorship.

== Life ==
Father Wilfredo served as a priest of Perquenco, a town and commune in southern Chile's Araucanía Region. When he was arrested on September 13, 1973, by Carabineros de Chile from the city of Lautaro, he was accused of "slandering and defacing" the Armed Forces and illegally taking land and acting as a militant of the MIR. He was detained for one week in the Lautaro prison, where he was subjected to multiple interrogations.

On the night of September 17 of the same year, his feet and hands were wrapped with barbed wire. He was transferred by a truck to the air base "Maquehue" of Temuco. He was a victim of poisoning and brutal beatings there. Later he was taken to the banks of the Cautín River where he was tortured and shot. Ferrada was thrown in the river, but survived.

He was secularized, had two children and died in July 2010.
