= Francisco Alarcón Estaba =

Venezuelan writer and poet (born 1950)

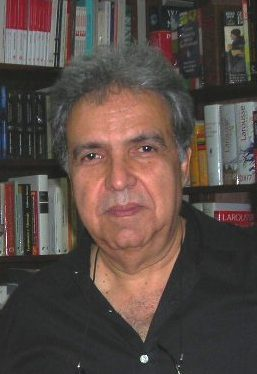
- Born: January 4, 1950 (age 76); Caracas, Venezuela
- Occupations: Poet, writer and editor

Francisco de Asís Alarcón Estaba (born January 4, 1950) is a Venezuelan writer, poet and editor.

== Career ==
Popularly known as Francisco Alarcón, he is the founder and editor of the Venezuelan digital newspaper, PUBLICACIONES FRANCISCO ALARCÖN in Caracas dated 2000.

At age of 21, Alarcon completed his academic studies, earning a Doctorate in Economics and Social Sciences. In his Biographical essays Francisco Alarcón see us being work by famous poets and writers. Without a premeditated order their biographies take us to The Generation of the 98, The Generation of 27, and The "Modernism", and continues among others with Jules Verne, Victor Hugo, Charles Baudelaire, Walt Whitman, Mark Twain There is no order precipitated with the grace and depth emerging authors, in his poetry begins with rhymed verses and sonnets with sadness and humor. Then, free verse, and deviations from the Castilian meters, looking abyss, fears and ghosts, Exchange is intended for itself.

Currently, Alarcon devotes himself to intellectual activity, being a regular columnist for printed media, such as: El Nacional, Últimas Noticias, 2001, El Globo, Tal Cual y Abril, and electronic media such as Analitica, NoticieroDigital, La Historia Paralela (Argentina) and Diario de América (EEUU)

His poems, short stories and essays have been translated into several languages and published in different Latin American media, including Brazil, Argentina, Peru, Mexico, Cuba as well as, in the United States, Europe and Australia.

His poetry work is part of "Como Ángeles en llamas. Algunas voces latinoamericanas del Siglo XX".

Américo Martín has described his style as "centauric" or " integralistic'.

Francisco Alarcón has more than fifty published books.

== Personal life ==
Heis the son of Pedro Alarcón Lazarde and Rosario Estaba de Alarcón.

== Works ==
- Poemas número uno (1968)
- Cuentos del gallero (1969)
- Segundos aires ISBN 980-12-0195-9 (2003)
- Sueños de agua (2003) ISBN 9789803900502.
- Ven, niña ISBN 980-12-0496-6 (2004)
- Resplandores hueros I y II (2004)
- Alucinación (2005)
- Encuentro ISBN 980-12-1034-6 (2005)
- Cuéntese, camarada (2006)
- Ensayos (2005)
- Chavéz no es un problema teórico (2007) ISBN 9789801227748
- Obras escogidas (2007)
- Mujer ISBN 978-980-122926-1 (2008)
- Da la cara ISBN 978-980-12-2926-1(2008)
- Prosas fúnebres ISBN 978-980-12-3308-4 (2008)
- La historia de lo ajeno 978-980-12-2774-8 (2009)
- Venezuela es tuya y mía también. (2009)
- A... ISBN 978-980-12-4332-8 (2010)
- Soledad y otros poemas (2011)
- Sutilezas Tomo I y II (2012)
