= Shaun Mawer =

English footballer

Personal information
- Full name: Shaun Kerry Mawer
- Date of birth: 6 August 1959
- Place of birth: Ulceby, England
- Date of death: 17 July 2010 (aged 50)
- Place of death: Hull, England
- Position: Full back

Youth career
- Grimsby Town

Senior career*
| Years | Team | Apps | (Gls) |
| 1977–1980 | Grimsby Town | 60 | (0) |
| 1980–19xx | Louth United | ? | (?) |
- * Club domestic league appearances and goals

Shaun Kerry Mawer (6 August 1959 – 17 July 2010) was an English professional footballer who played for Grimsby Town as a full back.

== Career ==
Born in Ulceby, North Lincolnshire, Mawer made his senior professional debut for Grimsby Town in September 1977, and was awarded the Young Player of the Year Award that same season. Mawer left Grimsby in 1980 after suffering a knee injury, and he later played non-League football with Louth United. During his three seasons as a professional with Grimsby, Mawer made 60 appearances in the Football League.

== After football ==
After retiring from football, Mawer became a marine engineer.

== Death ==
He died in hospital in Kingston upon Hull on 17 July 2010, aged 50, after a long illness. His funeral was held at lunchtime on 26 July at St Nicholas's Church, Ulceby.

Mawer had three daughters and two grandsons.
