= The Dressmaker =

The Dressmaker may refer to:

- The Dressmaker (Bainbridge novel), a 1973 gothic psychological novel written by Beryl Bainbridge

- The Dressmaker (1988 film), a 1988 British film based on the Bainbridge novel, directed by Jim O'Brien

- The Dressmaker (Ham novel), a gothic novel written by the Australian author Rosalie Ham

- The Dressmaker (2015 film), a 2015 Australian film based on the Ham novel, directed by Jocelyn Moorhouse

- The Dressmaker (opera), an operetta by Franz Berwald
