= Black Bag (disambiguation) =

Black Bag is a 2025 American spy thriller film directed by Steven Soderbergh.

Black Bag may also refer to:

- Black Bag (character), "The faithful border bin liner" character from Viz comic strips, drawn by Graham Murdoch, under the pen name of Snoddy
- Black Bag (novel), a 2026 novel by Luke Kennard
- The Black Bag, a 1922 American silent mystery film directed by Stuart Paton

== See also ==
- Black bag operation, a covert burglary, as an espionage technique, referring to the black bag of equipment that a burglar would carry
- Black-bag cryptanalysis, stealing of cryptographic secrets via burglary, or other covert means
- Black operation, a military or police operation under an assumed cover to conceal the identity of the party responsible
- That Dirty Black Bag, a 2022 television series on AMC+
