= Sweet William =

Sweet William may refer to:

- Dianthus barbatus, a species of flowering plant
- Mustelus antarcticus, a species of shark
- Sweet William (novel), a 1975 novel by Beryl Bainbridge
- Sweet William (film), a 1980 British drama film, based on the novel
- Sweet William (short story collection), a short story collection in the Just William series by Richmal Crompton
- "Lord William" or "Sweet William", a traditional Scottish folk ballad
