= An Awfully Big Adventure (novel) =

1989 novel by Beryl Bainbridge

- First edition
- Author: Beryl Bainbridge
- Language: English
- Genre: Psychological Fiction, Theatre-fiction
- Publisher: Duckworth
- Publication date: 1989
- Publication place: United Kingdom
- Media type: Print (Hardcover)
- ISBN: 978-0-7531-5120-4
- Preceded by: Watson's Apology
- Followed by: The Birthday Boys

An Awfully Big Adventure is a novel written by Beryl Bainbridge. It was shortlisted for the Booker Prize in 1990 and adapted as a movie in 1995. The story was inspired by Bainbridge's own experiences working at the Liverpool Playhouse in her youth. The title is an ironic reference to the original Peter Pan story, in which Peter says "To die will be an awfully big adventure."

== Storyline ==
Set in working-class England in 1950, the story observes sexual politics among a troupe of actors working at a shabby regional playhouse. During a Christmas production of Peter Pan, the play turns into a dark metaphor for youth when Stella Bradshaw, an ambitious teenage girl from the slums of Liverpool, joins the company and gets entangled in the backstage intrigue.

== Film adaptation ==
In 1995, Fine Line Features released a motion picture adaptation starring Alan Rickman, Hugh Grant and then-unknown actress Georgina Cates in the central role. The film was directed by Mike Newell and is one of the few film versions of Bainbridge's works.
