= Parker–Hulme murder case =

1954 New Zealand murder case

The Parker–Hulme murder case was the murder of Honorah Mary Rieper (also known as Honorah Mary Parker) in Christchurch, New Zealand, on 22 June 1954. The perpetrators were Rieper's teenaged daughter Pauline Parker and Pauline's friend Juliet Hulme. Parker was 16 at the time, while Hulme was 15. Both were sentenced to five years imprisonment and given new identities upon release. Hulme, under the name Anne Perry, became a detective fiction author, which only became public knowledge in 1994.

The murder received wider public attention following the release of Peter Jackson's 1994 film Heavenly Creatures.

== Background ==
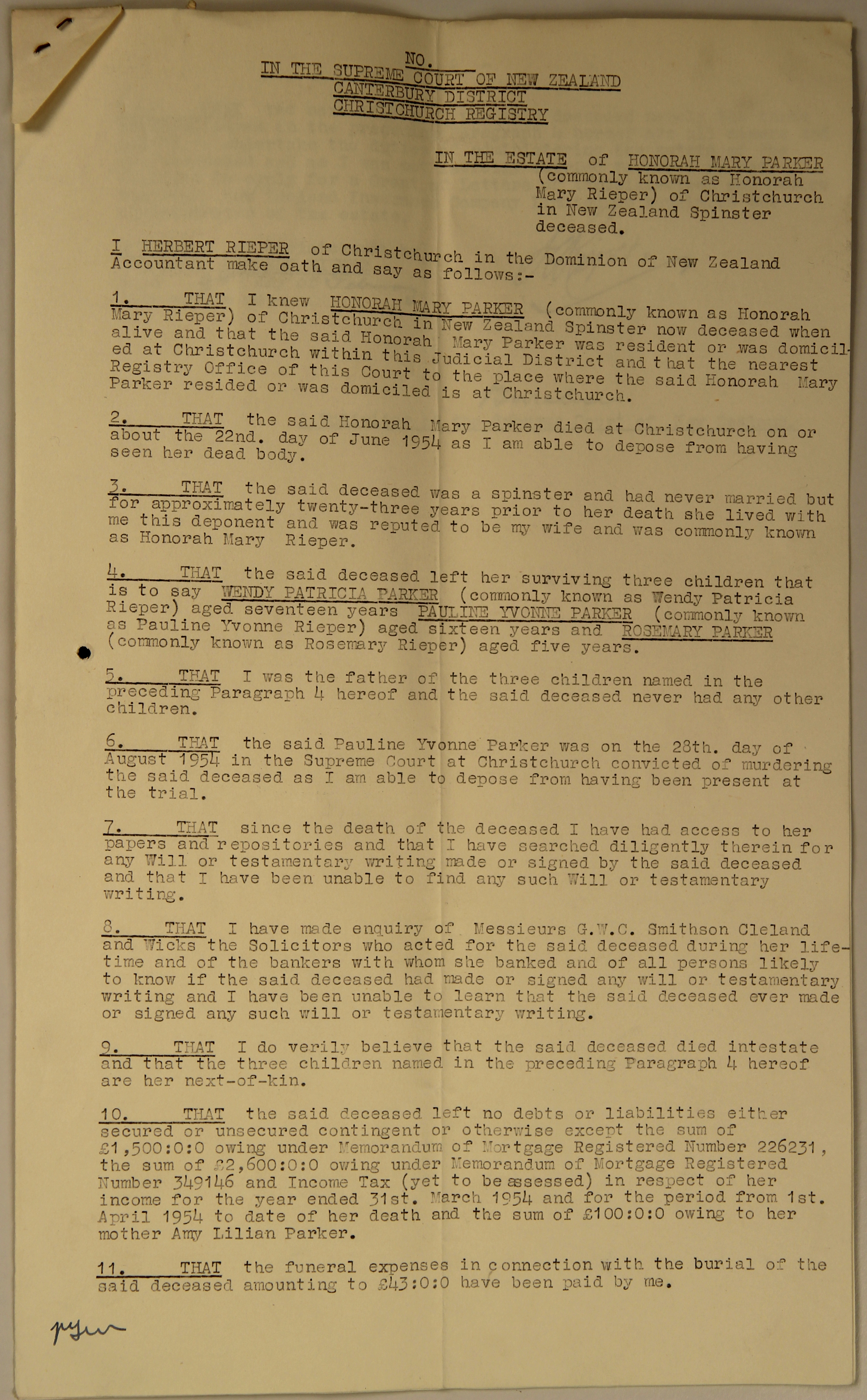
Deposition made by Herbert Rieper with regard to the estate of Honorah Mary Parker. As they were not married, her estate passed to her children.

Pauline Yvonne Parker (also known as Pauline Rieper) was born on 26 May 1938 in Christchurch. She met Juliet Hulme when they were both in their early teens. Parker came from a working-class background. Her parents were part-time house staff and gardeners, employed by the University of Canterbury. Her father, Herbert Rieper, and her mother, Honorah Mary Parker, were living together but were not actually married; this was not public knowledge and was only revealed at the trial.

Juliet Hulme was born in London on 28 October 1938 and immigrated to New Zealand in 1948 with her parents. She was the daughter of Henry Hulme, a physicist who became the rector of the University of Canterbury. The university provided their accommodation and the family lived at Ilam Homestead. Both Hulme and Parker attended Christchurch Girls' High School. The girls had both suffered illnesses as children, Parker with osteomyelitis and Hulme with tuberculosis, which formed the basis of an initial connection.

As their friendship developed, Parker and Hulme formed an elaborate fantasy life together. They wrote plays, books, and stories centred in this world and invented their own personal religion, with their own ideas on morality. They rejected Christianity and worshipped their own saints, envisioning a parallel dimension called The Fourth World, essentially their version of Heaven. The Fourth World was a place that they felt they were already able to enter occasionally, during moments of spiritual enlightenment. By Parker's account, they had achieved this spiritual enlightenment because of their friendship.

The girls' intense friendship caused Parker's parents to be concerned that they were engaged in a sexual relationship; at the time homosexuality was considered a mental illness. The Hulmes also had concerns, but both families continued to allow the girls to see one another, and Parker was accepted at the Hulme home in Ilam for overnights and vacations. Hulme became withdrawn and ill when Parker would leave her home without her.

Parker was not invited to go to Ilam over the summer holidays in 1953 as she had been in previous years. In 1954, Hulme's parents separated. Problems with faculty and the board forced Hulme’s father to resign from his position as rector of the university, and her mother was involved in an extramarital affair. Hulme's family planned to return to England, but it was decided that Hulme herself would be sent to live with relatives in South Africa—ostensibly for her health.

Both girls were heartbroken over their upcoming separation and decided that Parker should go to South Africa as well. They thought the Hulmes would agree to this plan. Parker was certain her mother would not allow her to go with Hulme. The girls formed a plan to murder Parker's mother in order to remove the perceived obstacle to their remaining together. Their long-term plan was to go from South Africa to Hollywood or New York City, where they believed they would publish their writing and work in film.

== Murder ==
On the afternoon of 22 June 1954, Parker and Hulme had afternoon tea with Parker's mother, Honorah Rieper, in a tea kiosk in Victoria Park, Christchurch. Following their meal they walked approximately 130 metres (430 ft) down the path through a wooded area of the park, where Hulme and Parker bludgeoned Rieper to death with half of a brick enclosed in an old stocking. After committing the murder, the two girls ran back to the tea kiosk. They were met by Agnes and Kenneth Ritchie, owners of the tea shop, whom they told that Rieper had fallen and hit her head.

Rieper's body was discovered in the park by Ritchie. Major lacerations were found about her head, neck, and face, with minor injuries to her fingers. Police soon discovered the murder weapon in the nearby woods. The girls' story of Rieper's accidental death quickly fell apart especially when Pauline's diary, documenting the whole idea, was discovered at her home.

== Trial and conviction ==
Prior to the trial, Parker had been known as Pauline Rieper, but the police investigations revealed that her mother was not in fact married to her father, Herbert Rieper. Thus, during the trial, both Honorah and Pauline were referred to with the surname "Parker".

The trial was a sensational affair, with speculation about the girls' possible lesbianism and insanity. Parker and Hulme were convicted on 28 August 1954; and, as they were too young to be considered for the death penalty, each spent five years in prison. Hulme served her sentence at Mount Eden prison in Auckland. Some sources say they were released on condition that they never contact each other again, but Sam Barnett, then Secretary for Justice, told journalists there was no such condition. Hulme's release was unconditional, and she immediately rejoined her father in Italy, while Parker was placed on six months' parole in New Zealand, after which she left the country.

Less than four months later, the murder was taken as strong evidence of moral decline by the Special Committee on Moral Delinquency in Children and Adolescents in what became known as the Mazengarb Report, named after Ossie Mazengarb, who chaired the committee.

== Release ==
=== Pauline Parker ===
Following her release from prison, Parker was given a new identity as Hilary Nathan, and spent some time in New Zealand under close surveillance before being allowed to leave for England. From at least 1992, she was living in the small village of Hoo, near Strood, Kent, and running a children's riding school. According to press reports in 1997, she had also worked as a teacher of children with learning disabilities at Abbey Court Special School in Strood, rising to deputy headteacher.

As an adult, she became a devout Roman Catholic. While she never spoke to the press, she expressed strong remorse, in a 1996 statement released through her sister, for having killed her mother. Her sister further stated that "[Pauline] committed the most terrible crime and has spent 40 years repaying it by keeping away from people and doing her own little thing ... After it happened, she was very sorry about it. It took her about five years to realise what she had done". In the early 2000s Parker lived a reclusive existence in a remote location in the Orkney Islands.

Parker died in Orkney in October 2026, at the age of 88. She had run a riding stable on Burray.

=== Juliet Hulme ===
After her release from prison, Hulme spent time in England and the United States, later settling in Scotland and becoming a successful historical detective novelist under her new name, Anne Perry. In approximately 1968, she became a member of The Church of Jesus Christ of Latter-day Saints. Until 1994, it was not well-known that Perry was Hulme. In March 2006, Hulme/Perry stated that, while her relationship with Parker was obsessive, they were not lesbians.

Perry died on 10 April 2023, at the age of 84.

== Media portrayals ==
=== Film ===
- Mais ne nous délivrez pas du mal (1971)
- Heavenly Creatures (1994)
- Reflections of the Past (2011)
- Remake (2009)

=== Books ===
- The Evil Friendship by M. E. Kerr (1958)
- Harriet Said... (1972)
- So Brilliantly Clever: Parker, Hulme, and the Murder That Shocked the World by Peter Graham (2011)
  - The 2013 edition was retitled as Anne Perry and the Murder of the Century.

=== Theatre ===
- The Christchurch Murder by Angela Carter aired on BBC Radio 4 in September 2018.
- Mary Orr and Reginald Denham's 1967 play Minor Murder
- Michelanne Forster's 1992 New Zealand play Daughters of Heaven

== See also ==
- List of solved missing person cases: 1950–1999
- Matricide
- Parricide
- Slender Man stabbing
