= Mum and Mr. Armitage =

1985 story collection by Beryl Bainbridge

- First edition
- Author: Beryl Bainbridge
- Language: English
- Publisher: Gerald Duckworth & Co
- Publication date: 1985
- Publication place: United Kingdom
- Pages: 144
- ISBN: 978-0-715-62080-9

Mum and Mr. Armitage is the first short story collection by English author Beryl Bainbridge containing twelve stories and published in 1985 by Gerald Duckworth & Co and in 1987 by McGraw-Hill in the United States.

== Stories ==
1. "Mum and Mrs Armitage" - Set near Welshpool the eponymous pair (the widowed Rosemary Mumford called 'Mum') regularly visit a hotel and delight the regular guests, playing pranks and games. Miss Elliott feels left out, the pair then play a joke on her, which leads to Mum's comeuppance.
2. "Beggars Would Ride" (Winter's Tale 26, 1980) - In 1605 two horsemen buried a small round object in Hampstead, the ground erupted and the two men disappear. Over 375 years later two businessmen, Ben Lewis and Frobisher, now play tennis in Hampstead. They find that their tennis skills have dramatically improved. Ben Lewis retrieves a lost tennis-ball nearby and then touches a 'small round object' and he then disappears with a loud hissing noise and a large cloud floating away. Frobisher cannot find him - then he notices a round object next to a tennis ball...
3. "The Longstop" - A family in Formby go to watch a cricket match in 1944, where the grandfather and father are talking to themselves without interacting with each other, with the mother and daughter occasionally interjecting.
4. "People For Lunch" - On Sunday, Margaret and Richard invite Charles and Dora to their small house for lunch, their son wanted to watch the television so they moved the table to the front yard next to the dustbins. Then Margaret corners Charles in the bathroom as she tries to kiss him.
5. "You Should Talk to Someone" - Teenager Katie speaks about her mother Agnes's poor communication skills. Katie then spends time with her mothers's friend Moona. Moona talks about relationships to Katie and that Agnes is worried about her daughter. Moona's boyfriend then arrives and asks Katie to go with lodger Bernard to his basement room.
6. "Through a Glass Brightly" - Divorcee Norman Pearson is invited to a meeting planning the Mary Street Carnival. He decides to use his mothers crystal ball to pose as a fortune teller at the carnival. He is surprised that all of his prognostications are believed by his customers.
7. "Bread and Butter Smith" - On The Wirral a couple is plagued by a man called Smith. Every Christmas they stay in different hotels but Smith keeps appearing, sticking to them like a limpet. One year the husband devises a way to get rid of Smith...
8. "Clap Hands, Here Comes Charlie" (online)- A cleaning lady is given six tickets to a Peter Pan pantomime at Liverpool Empire Theatre. Her family enjoy the show and they discuss it at the interval. Her husband Charlie then suffers a heart attack at the end of the show.
9. "Somewhere More Central" - Alice's grandma has died as her and her mother travel by train from London to Liverpool and then to the funeral. Alice thinks about her mother and grandma.
10. "The Worst Policy" - Sarah is married to John but is having a relationship with Tony but they have nowhere to be in private. Her friend Penny has offered that they can come to her house when Penny is away having her haircut. When Sarah and Tony arrive and get into bed, Penny's son and his girlfriend climb through a window...
11. "The Man Who Blew Away" - Pinkerton's wife Gloria thought he was coarse fishing in Ireland but in fact he was traveling to Corfu to meet Agnes who gave him an ultimatum: to visit her or it was all over. On the journey to visit her Pinkerton had several 'religious experiences' on the last day Pinkerton decided to try parascending, but the rope snapped and he was blown away...
12. "Helpful O'Malley" - O'Malley is a lodger; his landlady has returned to Dublin and trusts him to look after the house and to vet any new lodgers. The arrangement is successful but there was always a problem with the second floor as the lodgers did not stay long on it. O'Malley thought that new lodger Edith Carp had no issues but then the curse of the second floor struck.

== Reception ==
- Nicholas Best in the Financial Times is generally positive: "Ordinary people in ordinary situations are Beryl Bainbridge's forte...the author has a good eye for the miseries of life...Not all the stories succeed but her fans will find that there is plenty to savour"
- Elizabeth Ward in The Washington Post finds the collection rather bleak: "All the stories distil an unmistakably English quality of rooted eccentricity. Possibly not since Joyce's Dubliners has there been so depressing a group-portrait of people trapped and stunted by their cultural circumstances...All dozen stories in Mum and Mr. Armitage are pretty funny; what limits them is that the laughter they prompt is so often uneasy. The humour which leavens these scenes of people getting, in various ways, their just deserts, is after all thoroughly dismissive. There are no second chances, no possibilities of redemption or life-altering revelation."
- Publishers Weekly praises the collection: "contains 12 faultlessly crafted and indisputably original tales...Embracing savage irony, supernatural adventures, gothica, misunderstandings, every story in this collection is a gem."
- In contrast Michiko Kakutani writing in The New York Times writes "such bleak settings are meant to mirror the emotional emptiness of the characters' lives. Nearly everyone in this collection suffers from alienation, loneliness or suppressed rage; not one has what could be considered a satisfying day-to-day existence or a sustaining relationship...In an effort, no doubt, to escape the confines of home life, some of Ms. Bainbridge's people turn to adultery or shadowy couplings, but more often than not, these liaisons also become cheerless affairs...it's clear that Ms. Bainbridge has a dry, dark-humoured wit as well as a sharp eye for incongruous details...Several of the stories in this collection rely on contrived deaths or descents into madness to underscore their characters' sad plights. Others pivot around heavy-handed reversals that fail to encompass the ambiguities and complexities of life." Kakutani concludes that "To make matters worse, these stories share a severely limited image bank...they contribute to the feeling that these stories are nearly as attenuated as the world portrayed by the author.

== Adaptations ==
Somewhere More Central was adapted for UK television in 1981, directed by Anne-Louise Wakefield, produced by Mike Healey and starring Caroline Embling (daughter) and Anne Dyson (grandma). It was broadcast on BBC1 on Tue 19 May 1981 at 22:35.
