= Michael Wood (literary scholar) =

British and American academic (born 1936)

Michael George Wood (born Lincoln, 19 August 1936) is a British and American professor emeritus of English at Princeton University. He is a literary and cultural critic, and an author of critical and scholarly books, and a writer of reviews, review articles, and columns.

Before joining Princeton, Wood taught at Columbia University's Department of English and Comparative Literature and chaired the English department at the University of Exeter in Devon, England.

== Early life and education ==
Michael George Wood was born in Lincoln, England on 19 August 1936. He obtained his BA in 1957 in French and German from St John's College, Cambridge and his PhD in 1962, also from Cambridge, for a thesis titled The Dramatic Function of Symbol in Maeterlinck and Claudel.

== Career ==
From 1964 to 1982 Wood taught at Columbia University, becoming Professor of English and Comparative Literature. He then took up the Professorship of English Literature at the University of Exeter (1982–95). In 1995 he was appointed Charles Barnwell Straut Class of 1923 Professor of English and Comparative Literature at Princeton University, a post he held until retiring in 2013.

Wood was director of the Gauss Seminars in Criticism at Princeton from 1995 to 2001, and he chaired Princeton's English department from 1998 to 2004. He contributes to literary publications such as The New York Review of Books and the London Review of Books, where he has been an editorial board member and wrote a column, "At the Movies". Wood also teaches at Middlebury College's Bread Loaf School of English in Vermont during the summers.

In addition to many reviews, he also has written books on Nabokov, the trans-historical appeal of the oracle from the Greeks to the cinema, on the relations between contemporary fiction and storytelling, and on literary figures including Luis Buñuel, Franz Kafka, Stendhal, Gabriel García Márquez, and W. B. Yeats. He is a Fellow of the Royal Society of Literature and a member of the British Academy, the American Academy of Arts and Sciences, and the American Philosophical Society.

== Personal life ==
Wood lives in New Jersey with his wife, Elena Uribe, and has three children: Gaby Wood, the chief executive of the Booker Prize Foundation, Patrick Wood, CEO of Util, and Tony Wood, former editor at the New Left Review and author of Chechnya: The Case For Independence. He lived briefly in Mexico City.

== Selected works ==
- Stendhal (Cornell University Press, 1971)
- America in the Movies (Basic Books, 1975)
- García Márquez: One Hundred Years of Solitude (Cambridge University Press, 1990)
- The Magician's Doubts: Nabokov and the risks of fiction (Chatto and Windus, 1994)
- Children of Silence: on contemporary fiction (Columbia University Press, 1998)
- Belle de Jour (British Film Institute Publishing, 2001)
- The Road to Delphi: the Life and Afterlife of Oracles (Farrar Straus and Giroux, 2003)
- Franz Kafka (Northcote House/British Council, 2004)
- Nation, Language, and the Ethics of Translation, editor with Sandra Bermann (Princeton University Press, 2005)
- Literature and the Taste of Knowledge (Cambridge University Press, 2005)
- Yeats and Violence (Oxford University Press, 2010)
- Film: A very short introduction (Oxford University Press, 2012)
- Alfred Hitchcock: The Man Who Knew Too Much (Houghton Mifflin Harcourt, 2015)
- On Empson (Princeton University Press, 2017)

Preceded by Edmund Keeley	Straut Professor of English at Princeton University; 1995–present	Succeeded by incumbent
