= Children's Booker Prize =

British award for children's literature

The Children's Booker Prize
- Awarded for: Best contemporary fiction for children aged 8 to 12
- Country: United Kingdom
- Presented by: The Booker Prize Foundation
- Reward: £50,000
- Website: www.thebookerprizes.com
- Related: Booker Prize, International Booker Prize

The Children's Booker Prize was announced by the Booker Prize Foundation in October 2025. Complementing the existing Booker Prize for English-language fiction and the International Booker Prize for works translated into English, it will be awarded annually to recognise the best contemporary fiction for children aged eight to twelve published in the United Kingdom or Ireland, either originally written in English or translated from other languages. The winner will receive £50,000.

Gaby Wood, the foundation's chief executive, said that the prize aimed to be several things at once: "an award that will champion future classics written for children; a social intervention designed to inspire more young people to read; and a seed from which we hope future generations of lifelong readers will grow."

== 2027 prize ==
To be eligible for the 2027 prize, nominated books must be published between 1 November 2025 and 31 October 2026. Submissions for the inaugural prize will open in early 2026, with the first winner to be announced in February 2027.

Three adult judges will form the panel responsible for selecting the shortlist of eight books. Three children judges will then assist them in selecting the final winner. The inaugural panel of judges is to be chaired by Frank Cottrell-Boyce, the Children's Laureate.

The winner will receive £50,000, with an additional £2,500 for each of the shortlisted authors. If the winning book is a translation or a graphic novel, the prize money will be split equally between the author and the translator or illustrator; if the winner is a "highly illustrated" book, the publisher will decide how the prize is to be shared. The Booker Prize Foundation, in partnership with the AKO Foundation, plans to gift 30,000 copies of the shortlisted and winning books to encourage reading for pleasure among children.
