= An Awfully Big Adventure =

1995 British film

- Theatrical release poster
- Directed by: Mike Newell
- Screenplay by: Charles Wood
- Based on: An Awfully Big Adventure by Beryl Bainbridge
- Produced by: Hilary Heath; Philip Hinchcliffe; Victor Glynn
- Starring: Alan Rickman; Hugh Grant; Georgina Cates
- Cinematography: Dick Pope
- Edited by: Jon Gregory
- Music by: Richard Hartley
- Distributed by: 20th Century Fox
- Release date: 7 April 1995
- Running time: 112 minutes
- Country: United Kingdom
- Language: English
- Budget: $4 million
- Box office: $2 million

An Awfully Big Adventure is a 1995 British coming-of-age film directed by Mike Newell. The story concerns a girl who joins a local repertory theatre troupe in Liverpool. During a winter production of Peter Pan, the play quickly turns into a dark metaphor for youth as she becomes drawn into a web of sexual politics and intrigue.

The title is an ironic nod to the original Peter Pan story, in which Peter says, "To die will be an awfully big adventure." Set in 1947, the film was adapted from the Booker Prize-nominated 1989 novel of the same name by Beryl Bainbridge.

== Plot ==
In the film's prologue, a hotelier ushers someone into a bomb shelter during the Liverpool Blitz. We see a brief flashback to a woman leaving her baby in a basement surrounded by flickering candles. Before departing from the house, she quickly drops a string of pearls on her child's pillow, twined around a single rose.

Some time later, Stella Bradshaw lives in a working class household with her Uncle Vernon and Aunt Lily in Liverpool. Lacking a person in her life to whom she feels close, she frequently goes into phone booths to "speak with her mother", who never appears in the film. Her uncle, who sees a theatrical career as being her only alternative to working behind the counter at Woolworth's, signs her up for speech lessons and pulls strings to get her involved at a local repertory theatre. After an unsuccessful audition, Stella gets a job gofering for Meredith Potter, the troupe's sleazy, eccentric director, and Bunny, his faithful stage manager.

The impressionable Stella develops a crush on the worldly, self-absorbed Meredith, whose homosexuality completely eludes her. Amused, he gives her the small role of Ptolemy the boy-king in Caesar and Cleopatra but ignores her otherwise. Meredith reveals himself to be an amoral, apathetic man who treats Stella and everyone else around him with scorn and condescension. He reserves his greatest cruelty for Dawn Allenby, a desperate actress whom he callously dismisses from the company, who later attempts suicide.

Meredith also has a long history of preying upon young men. Stella is quickly caught up in the backstage intrigue and also becomes an object of sexual advances from boys in and around the theatre company, including P. L. O'Hara, a brilliant actor who has returned to the troupe in a stint playing Captain Hook for its Christmas production of Peter Pan. In keeping with theatrical tradition, O'Hara also doubles as Mr. Darling.

O'Hara carries himself with grace and charisma, but privately is as troubled and disillusioned as the other members of the cast. Haunted by his wartime experiences and a lost love who he believes bore him a son, O'Hara embarks on an affair with Stella, to whom he feels an inexplicably deep emotional connection. Stella, who is still determined to win over Meredith, remains emotionally detached, but takes advantage of O'Hara's affections, seeing an opportunity to gain sexual experience.

The last straw for Stella is during a cast outing when Geoffrey, a fellow stagehand whom Meredith has been sexually toying with, bursts out and hits him in the nose. The cast rushes to comfort Geoffrey, but Stella exclaims that he ought to be sacked. O'Hara explains to her that Meredith has spent his life harming people like Geoffrey and causing pain to people like Bunny who really love him: "believe it or not, it doesn't much matter him or her to Meredith. What he wants is hearts."

Concerned, O'Hara visits her aunt and uncle, who disclose Stella's history. He finds out that Stella's long-missing mother was his lost love, whom he then knew by the nickname Stella Maris, making Stella — whom he's been sleeping with, his child, a daughter rather than the son he had imagined. Keeping his discovery to himself, O'Hara gets on his motorcycle and drives back out to the seaport. Distracted by his new findings, he slips on a wet gangplank, hits his head, and is pitched into the water. Before he drowns, he sees the girl from earlier flashbacks, clutching her infant. Stella is later seen hastening to the phone booth to confide her woes over the phone. The absent Stella Maris had years ago won a nationwide contest to be the voice of the speaking clock. It is her recorded voice that provides the only response to her daughter's confidences.

== Cast ==
- Alan Rickman as P.L. O'Hara
- Hugh Grant as Meredith Potter
- Georgina Cates as Stella Bradshaw
- Alun Armstrong as Uncle Vernon
- Peter Firth as Bunny
- Carol Drinkwater as Dawn Allenby
- Rita Tushingham as Aunt Lily
- Prunella Scales as Rose Lipton
- Edward Petherbridge as Richard St. Ives
- Nicola Pagett as Dotty Blundell
- Clive Merrison as Desmond Fairchild
- Alan Cox as Geoffrey
- James Frain as John Harbour
- Patti Love as Mary Deare

== Production ==
Georgina Cates was initially declined when she first auditioned for the film under her real name, Clare Woodgate. Upon rejection, she dyed her hair red, changed her name and reinvented herself as a teenage girl from Liverpool with no acting experience and applied again. The second time she got the role. Alan Rickman was reportedly miffed when he found out her true age. According to Mike Newell, he "treated her very tactfully, presuming that she was sexually inexperienced and could get upset by the scene."

Hugh Grant based his characterization of Meredith on Richard Digby Day, a past director of his from Nottingham Playhouse.

Principal photography took place mostly in Dublin; the playhouse in the film was the Olympia Theatre.

== Soundtrack ==
A soundtrack album was released on 20 June 1995 by Silva Screen Records. In addition to the original film score composed by Richard Hartley, the Irish folk song "The Last Rose of Summer" is used as O'Hara's theme music throughout the film.

== Reception ==
=== Box office ===
The film did not perform well at the box office, grossing only £593,354 in the United Kingdom and $258,195 in the United States. It grossed $2 million worldwide.

=== Critical response ===
On review aggregator Rotten Tomatoes the film holds an approval rating of 40% based on 15 reviews, with an average rating of 4.5/10.

Although Rickman and Grant were unanimously praised, many were indifferent to the film's bleak, subtle humor and episodic structure. Lisa Schwarzbaum of Entertainment Weekly wrote that "Rickman... is the most interesting thing going in this unwieldy muddle... There's a creepy allure to O'Hara, and it is his energy that moves the story along to its unsettling surprise ending." Edward Guthmann of the San Francisco Chronicle wrote, "This isn't a sentimental slice of British eccentricity, or a gentle glance at amateur theatricals and the oddballs who inhabit them... Instead, it's a sour, unpleasant experience that gives us every reason not to become involved. Newell, who directed Four Weddings with such a light touch and such fondness, leaves the impression here that he doesn't like his characters and doesn't mind if we don't, either."

Janet Maslin of The New York Times, however, felt that it captured "Mr. Grant as the clever, versatile character actor he was then becoming, rather than the international dreamboat he is today... [the film] isn't overly concerned with making its stars look good. Mr. Grant wears a monocle, has nicotine-stained fingers and appears in one scene looking dissolute and vomit-stained... As it turns out, a public relations blackout is only the least of this admirable film's problems. Its Liverpool accents are thickly impenetrable. And Ms. Bainbridge's book is elliptical to begin with, which guarantees that some of its fine points will be lost in translation. Mr. Newell directs his actors beautifully, but the screenplay by Charles Wood echoes Ms. Bainbridge in letting important information fly by obliquely. So listen closely. This is a dark, eccentric film that both requires and rewards keen attention."

Similarly, Joel Pearce of DVD Verdict commented that "An Awfully Big Adventure is disappointing, but not because it's a bad movie... In fact, it's a good movie that's been the victim of extremely bad marketing... Hugh Grant is at his sleazy, sardonic best... Some elements of the film are too subtle, so it takes a while to figure out what's really going on."

Alan Rickman later said that he felt the film suffered comparisons to Four Weddings and a Funeral.

Hugh Grant later stated he wished that movie were more successful as it could have allowed him to play a wider range of roles earlier in his career.

=== Honours ===
- Crystal Globe - Karlovy Vary International Film Festival, Czech Republic (nominated)
- Actress of the Year (Georgina Cates) - London Film Critics Circle (nominated)
