= The Bottle Factory Outing =

1974 novel by Beryl Bainbridge

- First edition (UK)
- Author: Beryl Bainbridge
- Language: English
- Genre: Black comedy
- Publisher: Duckworth (UK); George Braziller (US)
- Publication date: Oct 1974 (UK); Jan 1975 (US)
- Publication place: United Kingdom
- Media type: Print, audio & ebook
- Pages: 160 (UK)
- ISBN: 0-7156-0864-9
- OCLC: 1255205
- Dewey Decimal: 823/.9/14
- LC Class: PZ4.B162 Bo PR6052.A3195

The Bottle Factory Outing is a 1974 novel by English writer Beryl Bainbridge. It was shortlisted for the Booker Prize that year, won the Guardian Fiction Prize and is regarded as one of her best. It is also listed as one of the 100 greatest novels of all time by Robert McCrum of The Observer. The book was inspired by Beryl Bainbridge's own experiences working as a cellar girl in a bottling factory after her divorce in 1959.

== Plot ==
Freda and Brenda are two young women living and working in north London. Freda, aged 26, is a large, flamboyant and assertive blonde, with aspirations of going on the stage. The privately educated Brenda, aged 32, is more reticent and strives to avoid confrontation: she was previously married and lived in rural Yorkshire, but has left her husband and moved south. The two live together in a dismal bedsit, sharing a double bed, although Brenda insists on a barrier made up of a bolster and books to separate their respective halves. By day they work as labellers in a wine-bottling factory owned by Mr Paganotti, an Italian.

The workers in the factory are also almost all Italian, and largely male. The senior staff members are Rossi, the manager; and Vittorio, a trainee manager and Paganotti's nephew. The workforce forms a strongly Italian enclave, deeply respectful of Paganotti, and in cautious awe of the two English women. Rossi regularly summons Brenda to the remoter parts of the factory to make amorous advances towards her, which she resists. Patrick, an Irish van driver, also takes an interest in her: his advances are less overt, but equally unwelcome. Freda, meanwhile, has romantic designs on Vittorio.

A works outing has been proposed by Freda (with hopes that it might provide an opportunity to seduce Vittorio), and approved by Paganotti, who has donated four barrels of wine. However, on the appointed Sunday in October, the van supposedly booked as transport is unavailable (surreptitiously cancelled by Vittorio, who wants to discourage Freda's attentions). The only transport therefore comprises Rossi's Ford Cortina and the Mini belonging to Salvatore, one of the workers, which means that the number of those who can go on the trip is limited to nine (including Freda, Brenda, Vittorio, and Patrick). The other workers all have to return home.

Freda had planned to visit a stately home in Hertfordshire, but Rossi instead decides to head for Windsor. The cars lose one another twice, but the two groups eventually visit Windsor Castle and St George's Chapel, before moving on to Windsor Great Park for a picnic. Later, Brenda and Freda argue, and Freda storms off into the bushes. Brenda eventually goes in search of her and finds her dead. She has no obvious injuries, and it is unclear exactly what has happened.

Rossi, Vittorio and Patrick all become privy to Freda's death. There is a tacit agreement not to call an ambulance or the police. The other members of the party are still unaware of the incident, and so Freda's body is bundled into the back of the Cortina under the pretence that she is drunk, and the cars proceed as planned to Windsor Safari Park. The Cortina is refused admittance because it has a soft top, and the party has to take a bus tour, leaving Freda in the car. There are hints that Patrick may have been responsible for the death; but Patrick himself points the finger at Rossi.

The cars return to London, where Freda's body is placed in an upstairs storage area in the factory: the occupants of the Mini now become aware of what has happened. The next day, Monday, Maria, a fellow labeller, cleans and prepares Freda's body, dressing her in a white nightgown. Everything is concealed from Mr Paganotti, but after he has left for the day a funeral supper takes place, with Italian confectionery and plastic tulips. A plan is hatched for disposing of the body. It will be placed in an empty sherry barrel, one of a consignment being returned to Spain: the barrel will be marked as defective, and Rossi knows that this means it will be disposed of by being thrown into the sea at Santander.

Rossi confesses that it was he who was responsible for Freda's death: he had made a pass at her, she, in avoiding him, had fallen backwards, and he had fallen on top of her. Mulling over events afterwards, Brenda realises that, out of loyalty to the Paganotti family, Rossi is covering up for the true perpetrator, Vittorio. However, she concludes that the matter is no longer of importance. The next morning she watches as the barrel is loaded onto the back of a lorry for its final journey.

== Reception ==
- Peter Tinniswood in The Times writes "This is a superb novel. It is taut in construction, expansive in characterization, vibrant in atmosphere and profoundly comic".
- Harry Blamires likens Freda's romantic dreams to those of Joyce's Gerty MacDowell in Ulysses and he concludes "Beryl Bainbridge manages plots of escalating comedy and grotesqueness with consummate skill. She is brilliant at scattering humour over seemingly gruesome terrain".
- Sam Jordison also praises the novel in The Guardian: "The Bottle Factory Outing more than delivers on that initial promise. Its sentences remain so masterfully restrained that you barely notice the barb until you’ve taken a few steps on – and find yourself hooked back...It's a novel with a uniquely woozy feel – a jelly-legged sense of uncertainty – that feels all the stranger because the sentences appear so superficially straightforward. It is, in short, superb prose. There are perhaps few sentences that stand out as individual gems. But there are also few writers who offer more control and delight line-by-line."

== Film adaptation ==
A BBC-sponsored film adaptation was planned in 1991 starring Dawn French and Jennifer Saunders with a script by Alan Plater, but the project was never made.
