= Young Adolf =

1978 novel by Beryl Bainbridge

- Cover of the first edition
- Author: Beryl Bainbridge
- Language: English
- Subject: Adolf Hitler
- Genre: Novel
- Set in: Liverpool
- Publisher: Gerald Duckworth & Co.
- Publication date: 1978
- Publication place: London, England, United Kingdom
- Media type: Print
- Pages: 174
- ISBN: 978-0-7156-1323-8

Young Adolf is a novel written by author Beryl Bainbridge, and first published in 1978 by Duckworth. Presented as biographical fiction, the book's main character is 23-year-old Adolf Hitler. Hitler visits relatives in Liverpool, where he gets into serious trouble with the English.

The book was adapted for television as The Journal of Bridget Hitler in 1981.
