= The Dressmaker (1988 film) =

1988 film by Jim O'Brien

- Directed by: Jim O'Brien
- Written by: John McGrath
- Based on: The Dressmaker by Beryl Bainbridge
- Produced by: Steve Clark-Hall; John McGrath; Ronald Shedlo
- Starring: Joan Plowright; Billie Whitelaw; Jane Horrocks
- Cinematography: Michael Coulter
- Edited by: William Diver
- Music by: George Fenton
- Production companies: British Screen Productions; Channel Four Films
- Distributed by: Rank Organisation
- Release dates: 16 November 1988 (London Film Festival); 14 December 1988 (United States)
- Running time: 92 minutes
- Country: United Kingdom
- Language: English
- Budget: £1.28 million

The Dressmaker is a 1988 British drama film directed by Jim O'Brien and starring Joan Plowright, Billie Whitelaw and Pete Postlethwaite. It is an adaptation of the 1973 novel The Dressmaker by Beryl Bainbridge.

== Plot ==
Set during the Second World War in England, the story concerns a claustrophobic relationship between two middle-aged sisters and their fragile 17-year-old niece.

== Production ==
Some scenes were shot on location in Liverpool, including at Liverpool Cathedral.

The costume designer for The Dressmaker was Academy Award-nominated British designer Judy Moorcroft.

== Cast ==
- Joan Plowright – Nellie
- Billie Whitelaw – Margo
- Pete Postlethwaite – Jack
- Jane Horrocks – Rita
- Tim Ransom – Wesley
- Pippa Hinchley – Val
- Rosemary Martin – Mrs Manders
- Tony Haygarth – Mr Manders
- Michael James Reed – Chuck
- Sam Douglas – Corporal Zawadski
- Bert Parnaby – Mr Barnes
- Lorraine Ashbourne – Factory Girl
- Mandy Walsh – Factory Girl
- Margi Clarke – Shopwoman
- Andrew Moorcroft – Butcher's Boy
- Marie Jelliman – Mrs O'Toole

== Release ==
The film was shown at the London Film Festival on 16 November 1988. It opened in New York and Los Angeles on 14 December.

== Reception ==
Time Out Magazine reported: "John McGrath's wittily scripted adaptation of Beryl Bainbridge's novel is played with stylish gusto by all concerned. Horrocks plays the innocent so well that you feel like strangling her; Plowright and Whitelaw are a joy throughout."
