= Injury Time =

Injury Time may refer to:

- Injury time
- Injury Time (novel), a novel by Beryl Bainbridge
- Injury Time (radio series), a radio comedy programme
