= Harriet Said... =

1972 novel by Beryl Bainbridge

- First edition (UK)
- Author: Beryl Bainbridge
- Language: English
- Publisher: Duckworth (UK); George Braziller (US)
- Publication date: 1972 (UK), 1973 (US)
- Publication place: United Kingdom
- Media type: Print
- Pages: 152
- ISBN: 0-7156-0657-3
- OCLC: 632645
- Dewey Decimal: 823/.9/14
- LC Class: PZ4.B162 Har PR6052.A3195

Harriet Said... was the first novel written by Beryl Bainbridge, based on newspaper reports about the Parker–Hulme murder case in New Zealand which involved two young girls.

Although completed in 1958 it was rejected by several publishers in the late fifties, and one of the rejections is quoted on the flyleaf of the first edition:

What repulsive little creatures you have made the two central characters, repulsive almost beyond belief! And I think the scene in which the two men and the two girls meet in the Tsar's house is too indecent and unpleasant even for these lax days. What is more, I fear that even now a respectable printer would not print it!

The manuscript was thought lost but was found by one publisher, returned to the author and finally published by Duckworth in 1972, and by George Braziller in the US the following year.

== Plot ==
It concerns two schoolgirls spending their holiday in an English coastal town. Harriet is the older at 14 and the leader of the two. The 13-year-old unnamed narrator develops a crush on an unhappily married middle-aged man, Peter Biggs, whom they nickname "the Tsar". Led by pretty, malevolent Harriet, they study his relationship with his wife, planning to humiliate him. Their plan quickly goes wrong, however, with horrifying results.
