= Every Man for Himself (novel) =

1996 novel written by Beryl Bainbridge

- First edition (publ. Duckworth)
- Author: Beryl Bainbridge
- Language: English
- Publication date: 1996

Every Man for Himself is a 1996 novel by Beryl Bainbridge about the 1912 RMS Titanic disaster. The novel won the 1996 Whitbread Prize, and was a nominee of the Booker Prize. It also won the 1997 Commonwealth Writers' Prize (Europe and South Asia).

== Plot synopsis ==
The novel is narrated by 22-year-old Morgan, a rich young American orphan who is a relation of banker J. P. Morgan, having been brought up by his aunt and cousin. The book is divided into four sections, each one corresponding to a day Morgan spends on the RMS Titanic. He provides a lively account of the middle-class to upper-class passengers found on the luxury liner, while finding time to fall in love with spoilt young socialite Wallis Ellery. Leading figures in the tragedy appear prominently including Captain Smith, naval architect Thomas Andrews and White Star Line owner J. Bruce Ismay. The narrator finally makes his way to a collapsible lifeboat after the sinking of the Titanic, and is rescued by the crew of Carpathia.
