= Quiet life =

Quiet Life is a 1979 album by Japan.

Quiet life may also refer to:

- "Quiet Life" (song), a song by Japan
- Quiet Life (film), a 2024 film by Alexandros Avranas
- A Quiet Life, a 2010 film directed by Claudio Cupellini
- A Quiet Life (novel), a 1976 fiction novel by Beryl Bainbridge
- "A Quiet Life", a song from Dracula, the Musical
- The Quiet Life, 2012 album by Anchor and Braille

== See also ==
- Anything for a Quiet Life, a 1662 play by Thomas Middleton and John Webster
- Anything for a Quiet Life (short story collection), a 1990 collection of short stories by Michael Gilbert
