= Mazengarb Report =

New Zealand Report

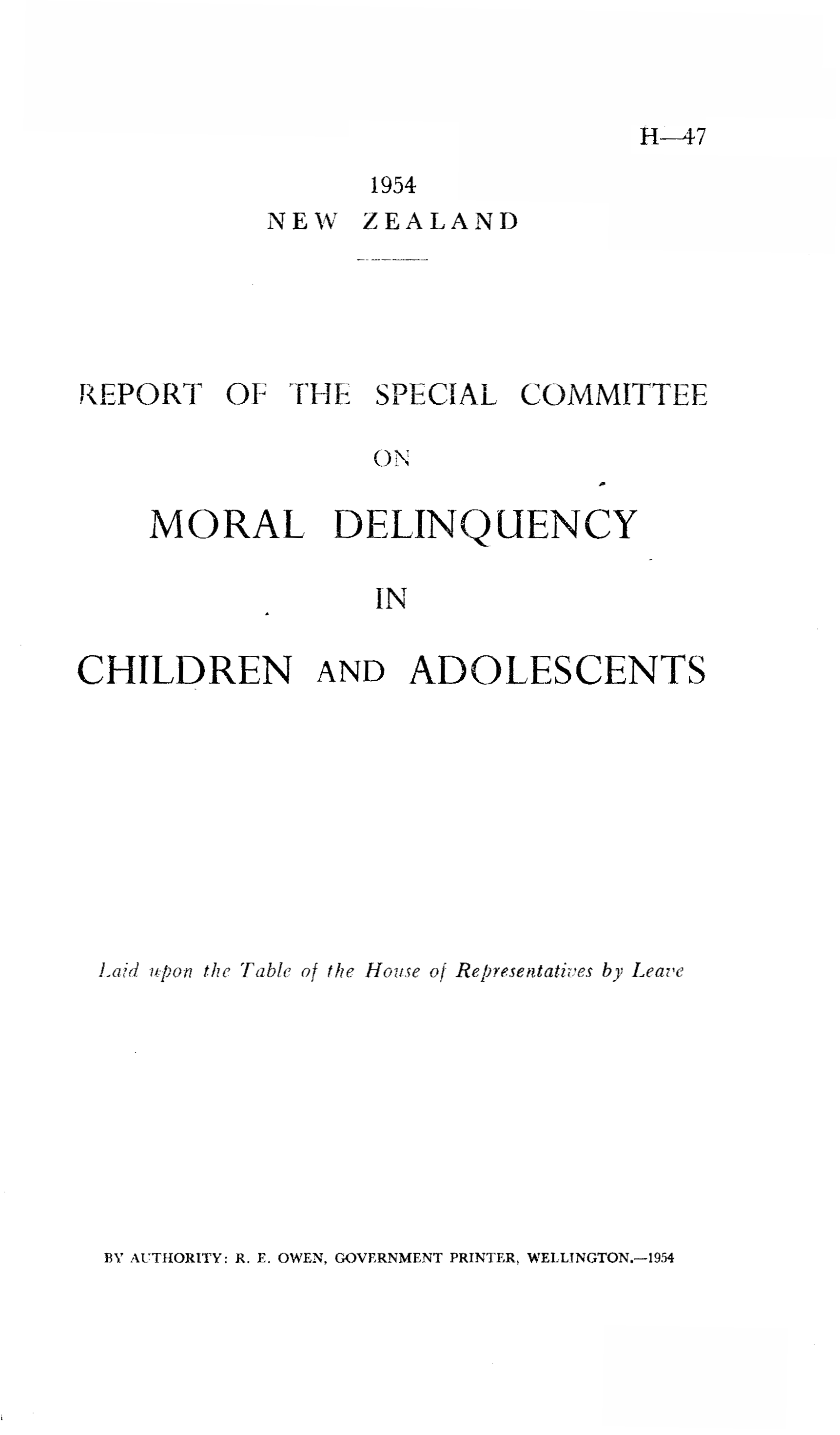
The cover page of the report.

The Mazengarb Report of 1954, formally titled the Report of the Special Committee on Moral Delinquency in Children and Adolescents, resulted from a New Zealand ministerial inquiry (the Special Committee on Moral Delinquency in Children and Adolescents). The report gained its name from the inquiry chairman, Queen's Counsel Ossie Mazengarb. The Report, its origins and its significance still remain key items in the mythology of 1950s New Zealand social history. This is not to deny the importance of the Report; however, its real significance has been obscured by inaccurate accounts in popular histories and newspaper and magazine articles. It is frequently cited as an example case of moral panic in New Zealand.

== The Petone incident ==
On 20 June 1954, shortly after her mother and stepfather had reported her as missing, a 15½-year-old girl turned up at the local police station in the former Hutt Valley borough of Petone. The report details from page 11:

She stated that, being unhappy at home with her stepfather, she had[...] been a member of what she called a "Milk Bar Gang", which [...] met "mostly for sex purposes"; she [...] was worried about the future of its younger members, and desired the police to break up the gang.

Shortly after, following a police round up of some of those named, a moral panic ensued in New Zealand, in which the above incident played no small part among several others, including a milk bar murder in Auckland (which resulted in one of the last executions in New Zealand.)

== The Inquiry ==
A review of New Zealand newspapers of the time reveals reports of "youths charged with indecent assault upon, or carnal knowledge of" underage females. The inquiry's report notes this occurred "[in] the second week of July 1954".

After an outbreak of moral panic among the public and in newspaper media, the Crown appointed the Special Committee on 23 July, and it started its work only four days later, on 27 July. With what some contemporary commentators considered unreasonable alacrity, the Committee began hearing evidence on 3 August in Wellington, completing its hearings in Auckland on 10 September. Barely ten days later, on 20 September, the Committee had reported; Hansard records that the responsible cabinet minister had already sent the report to the Government Printer for printing before its actual tabling in Parliament.

Unusually for an inquiry report of that era, the report became one of the biggest jobs for the Government Printer at the time. It was noted that postal staff complained of the weight when carrying out another unusual task: distributing copies of the report to every household in the country.

=== Conclusions and recommendations ===
The report came up with 27 conclusions and about 20 recommendations.

==== Conclusions ====
Among the conclusions, in summary:

- 1 to 4 and 26 dealt with sexual immorality, noting that "immorality has been [organised]", and the unfairness that the authorities could charge boys for indecent conduct, but not girls.
- 5 to 9 urged a tightening of censorship-laws.
- 10 urged a "closer bond between school and home".
- 11 discounted the contribution that co-educational schools had made to "sexual delinquency".
- 12 urged tighter administration of a school leaving-age of 15.
- 13 recommended notifying school principals of students under government care.
- 14 and 21: "The school is not the proper place for fully instructing children about sex." However, the report characterised schools as good places to "listen to addresses or see appropriate films". It also claimed (21) that police found in many incidents that many youths were either "too ignorant" about sex, or knew too much about it.
- 15 appears to attack the previous Labour government's state-housing scheme, recording the belief that "the new housing developments" contained large numbers of young children without the good modelling of older people and organisations. Similarly, 16 says that despite community-groups doing their best, "facilities for recreation and entertainment will not cure juvenile delinquency".
- 17 placed some blame on parents' allowing consumption of alcohol at "young people's parties" (without specifying the age of the said young people).
- 18 and 19 noted the opinion that parental neglect left children feeling unloved, something the Committee believed conducive to delinquent acts.
- 20 appears to blame high wages of the time for discouraging the careful use of money (and thus, the Committee concluded, discouraging self-reliance).
- 22 and 23 addressed the state of religion and of family life: the "present state of morals in the community has indicated the value of a religious faith" and stated that a decline in family life resulted from a lack of respect for the "worth" of religious and social boundaries.
- 24 blamed "new concepts" coming about due to the destabilising effects of world wars, contraceptives, divorce liberalisation and increasing popularity of sexual relations before marriage.
- 25 conveyed the unanimous recommendation that minors should not have access to contraceptives.
- 27 urged that the Government take more preventive measures in the field of child welfare.

==== Recommendations ====
The recommendations covered legislative proposals, administrative suggestions and even "parental example". Highlights included:

- Crime:
  - Research: That long-term research into 'all aspects' of juvenile delinquency should begin.
  - Suggested legislative changes: That the legal system should have the ability to charge both girls and boys (implying underage persons) with indecent conduct. Additionally, if children are summonsed, their parents should be similarly compelled to attend court, and that courts should have the power (if the parent's behaviour was said to have "conduced" the child's offending) to order that parents pay fines and court costs and that parents give an assurance of the child's "future good behaviour". (Other sanctions suggested by the Committee included suspending social-security benefits relating to the child.)
  - Police: That policewomen's duties and training should include dealing with 'girls involved in sexual offences'.
  - Social welfare: That child welfare should become an autonomous service under the Minister of Social Welfare.
- Censorship:
  - Print publications: That tightening of censorship laws should occur to take into account "undue emphasis on sex, crime or horror". Additionally, that distributors of print publications be registered, with the spectre of cancellation of this licence to print or distribute should they distribute "objectionable publications" under proposed legislation.
  - Films and other publications generally: That the film-censorship office within the Department of Internal Affairs should finish gazetting some regulations as already authorised. Overall, that they and other censorship authorities should liaise regularly to maintain "a uniform interpretation of public opinion and taste".
  - Radio: That the New Zealand Broadcasting Service make sure the crime must never pay become "more prominently featured" in its radio-dramas, and that a "married woman" be "immediately"' appointed to its "auditioning panel".
- Education:
  - Schools: That the Department of Education consider the best way to deal with "problem pupils in post-primary schools".
  - Community groups: That the Department of Education consider allowing "responsible organisations" use of "school grounds and buildings" in areas with "a lack of facilities for recreation and entertainment".
  - Housing: That the Department of Education consider requesting the setting aside for schoolteachers of some houses in "housing settlements".
  - Parental example: That "new laws" and "stricter administration" might "allay the well-founded fears of many parents", but that the risk existed that parents might relax "their own efforts". "Wise parenthood implies firm control and continual interest in the doings of sons and daughters", the Committee advised, but also said that parents' own conduct would be the "best example for the [...] rising generation".

== Follow-up ==
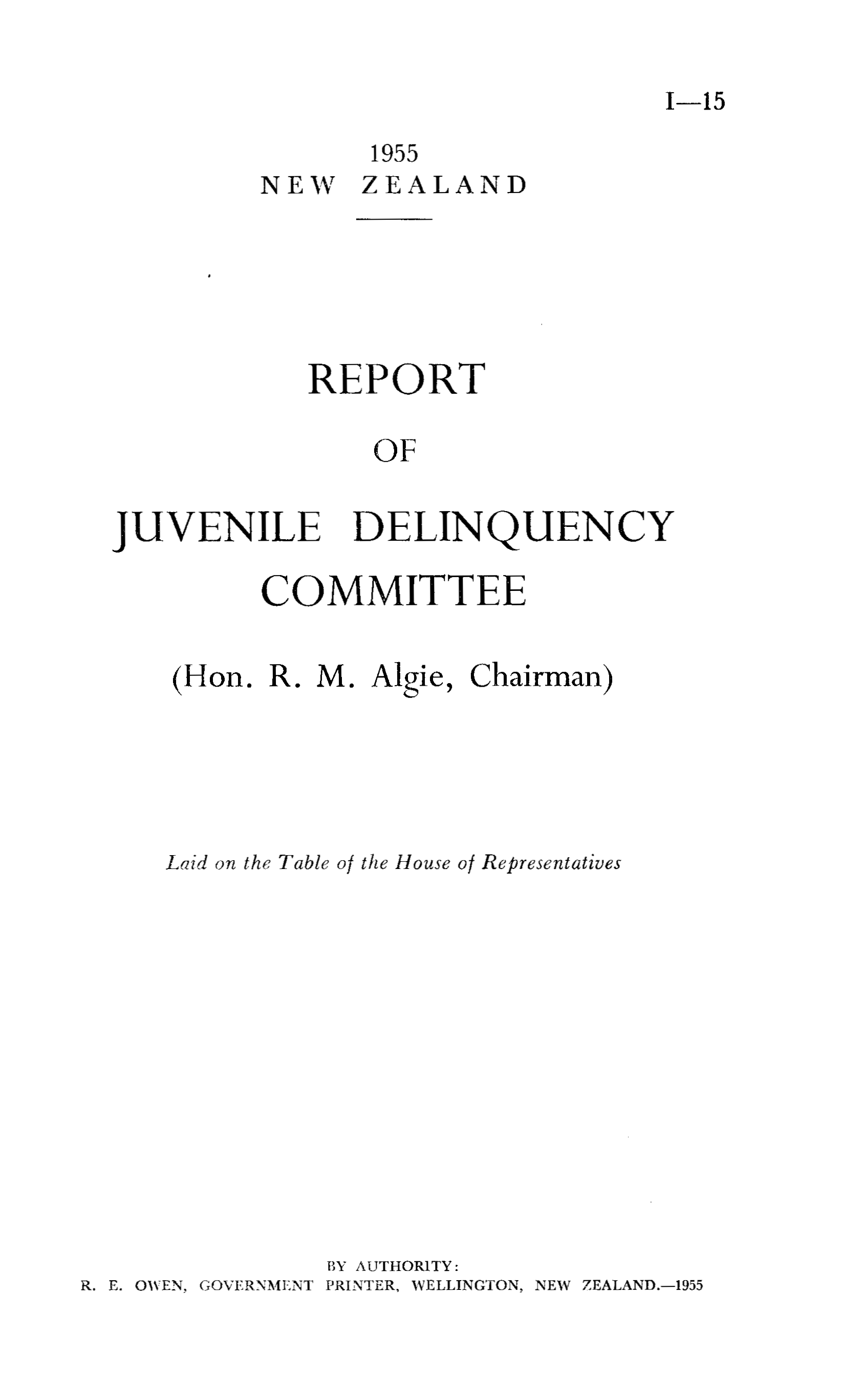
The cover page of the follow-up Report of Juvenile Delinquency Committee (AJHR 1955, I-15).

Parliament responded to the Mazengarb Report with a special select committee appointed on September 28, 1954. Its report (AJHR 1955, I-15) was due to be issued on October 1, 1955.
