= The Girl in the Polka Dot Dress =

2011 novel by Beryl Bainbridge

- First edition
- Author: Beryl Bainbridge
- Language: English
- Publisher: Little, Brown
- Publication date: 2011
- Publication place: United Kingdom
- Media type: Print
- Pages: 197

The Girl in the Polka Dot Dress is the last novel by writer Beryl Bainbridge published in 2011 following her death. As explained in the postscript:

Beryl Bainbridge was in the process of finishing The Girl in the Polka Dot Dress when she died on 2 July 2010. Her long-time friend and editor, Brendan King prepared the text for publication from her working manuscript, taking into account suggestions Beryl made at the end of her life. No additional material has been included.

== Plot ==
Set in the summer of 1968 the novel is based on the true story surrounding the assassination of Robert F. Kennedy where a woman wearing a polka dot is seen before and after the assassination of Robert F. Kennedy in the Ambassador Hotel in Los Angeles.

Rose, a dental receptionist, is the owner of the dress, and has travelled from Kentish Town (London) to the United States to find the enigmatic Dr. Wheeler, who rescued her from a terrible childhood. On her arrival in Baltimore she meets 'Washington Harold' who accompanies her in a camper van to track down Dr. Wheeler. Harold has ulterior motives for confronting Wheeler without telling Rose. They travel via Washington, Wanakena, Chicago, Santa Ana and then onto Los Angeles, where they arrive at Ambassador Hotel where Wheeler is part of Robert Kennedy's entourage.

== Reception ==
Alex Clark, writing in The Guardian, concludes that "It's no accident that when Rose and Harold reach Los Angeles they intersect with an episode from American history not only so painfully fateful but also so bewildering. The brief appearance of Sirhan Sirhan - Bobby Kennedy's assassin, whose actions have been the subject of theories that include hypnotism and mind control - pulls us towards dizzying thoughts of individual responsibility and the effects of charisma and personal magnetism. The Girl in the Polka Dot Dress may not have every final i dotted and t crossed but, as most of Bainbridge's oeuvre did, it leaves its readers with more to think about than one might imagine possible for such a slender tale. It is a fitting finale and a poignant farewell to a career defiantly and uncontestably sui generis."

Paul Bailey from The Independent also praises the novel "It is a pleasure to record that The Girl in the Polka-dot Dress ranks among the finest of Bainbridge's fine works of fiction. The narrative is by turns sombre, terrifying and hilarious... The Girl in the Polka-dot Dress reads like a summation of Beryl Bainbridge's art. It is carefully constructed, as always, but there is a sense in which the author is returning to her roots, using the rich material of her early life in wartime Liverpool to devastating effect, and that Rose is the last repository for those feelings that first inspired her to abandon acting and become a novelist. The constant theme in Bainbridge's novels, the all-important concern, is death. The idea of extinction informs her fiction from the beginning to the end of her writing life."

William Boyd writing in The New York Times explains that what "makes this novel different from the ones that have gone before is its darkness. The novel is suffused with death — the famous assassinations that marked the 1960s, of J.F.K. and Martin Luther King Jr., and Jack Ruby’s murder of Lee Harvey Oswald — but also the deaths encountered as the journey progresses. A funeral for a young man killed in Vietnam, a dog run over, a pervert stabbed by his victim: the body count is bleak and impossible to ignore. And because this is Bainbridge’s last novel, written during what she knew was a fatal illness, one wonders — legitimately — if her own prospective demise prompted these sombre meditations..."

Michael Dirda also praises the novel in The Washington Post, where he writes, "In the end, The Girl in the Polka-Dot Dress is strong on atmosphere, incident and wit, while remaining rather nebulous and tantalizing in its plot and resolution. So it’s not quite as fine a novel as those various Booker short-listed titles. Still, you’ll almost certainly enjoy Beryl Bainbridge’s dry humor and her book’s pervasive sense of menace. It’s an odd combination, but Bainbridge brings it off beautifully."
