= A Quiet Life (novel) =

1976 novel by Beryl Bainbridge

- First edition
- Author: Beryl Bainbridge
- Language: English
- Publisher: Duckworth (1976, UK); George Braziller (1977, US)
- Publication place: United Kingdom
- Media type: Print
- Pages: 200
- ISBN: 978-0-7156-11395

A Quiet Life is a novel by English author Beryl Bainbridge published in 1976 by Gerald Duckworth & Co, it 'depicts a dysfunctional family modelled closely on the author's own'.

== Plot ==
Set in the 1950s in a seaside village near Southport, the story centres around 17-year-old Alan who appears to be the sanest member of his family. His sister Madge is only 15 and is involved with a German POW, his bankrupt father Joe is unbalanced and has a blazing temper, and his mother Connie only married him for the money he no longer has and she keeps disappearing every evening. Alan's parents are considering divorce meanwhile his relationship with his girlfriend isn't always smooth. The novel is topped and tailed by short chapters set twenty-five years later where Alan meets with Madge following the death of their mother.

== Reception ==
- David Evans from The Independent says 'Bainbridge chooses to focus not on her ostensible avatar Madge (whose affair with the POW is based on a real-life romance) but on the scandalised brother. Bainbridge sensitively evokes Alan's growing awareness that "he could only hope to be an extension of his parents", trapped by the same notions of middle-class rectitude that Madge gleefully flouts. He never attains his sister's insight that what one does with one's life is "never important to anyone else". By the end of the novel they have come to represent two different kinds of people: those who care what people think, and those who don't. Bainbridge's fiction owes its enduring sharpness and vitality to the fact that she always belonged squarely in the latter category.
- Julia O'Faolain in The New York Times explains 'The novel itself is quiet: a feat of concealed craft. It is hard to deal with semi-articulate people without either short-changing them or boring the reader, and it must have been harder still to tell the story through the consciousness of someone as fact-shy as Alan. Mrs. Bainbridge turns the disability into a tool. Alan's flinching apprehension speeds the pace and gives it a life-like rhythm. His strobe-light vision allows sharp focus, flashes of intelligence and believable returns to bewilderment ...Twenty-five years later, when Alan has become a replica of his parents, the anarchic Madge, still refusing the bonds of adulthood, turns up in a school coat. Such devices help Mrs. Bainbridge catch the essential selves of her lower middle-class people, while respecting their reticence. Her ear for speech seems to me perfect. Her 1940's are authentically drab but returning to them in her company is a delight. She is a subtle and protean writer.'
- Phoebe-Lou Adams writing in The Atlantic is more circumspect about the novel: 'Without a single decisive action-unless tossing a collapsing family heirloom on the bonfire can be counted as such—Ms. Bainbridge's characters achieve a high degree of domestic misery. This is the kind of novel that one is obliged to respect while not enjoying a word of it.'
