= Sweet William (novel) =

1975 novel by Beryl Bainbridge

- First edition (UK)
- Author: Beryl Bainbridge
- Language: English
- Publisher: Duckworth (UK); George Braziller (US)
- Publication date: 1975
- Publication place: United Kingdom
- Media type: Print
- Pages: 160
- ISBN: 0-7156-0927-0

Sweet William is a 1975 novel written by Beryl Bainbridge, it was made into a 1980 film of the same name (starring Jenny Agutter and Sam Waterston) for which Bainbridge wrote the screenplay.

== Plot introduction ==
Ann lives in Hampstead and works for the BBC in Bush House in London. She is recently engaged but her academic fiancé Gerald is leaving for America, intending her to follow. Shortly afterwards she meets William, a Scottish playwright who sweeps her off her feet and moves in. Within days she has "encouraged adultery, committed a breach of promise, given up her job, abetted an abortion". But William's a compulsive philanderer, twisting the truth to cover his tracks...

== Inspiration ==
She based the title character on writer Alan Sharp with whom she had a daughter, "I didn’t exaggerate his character" recalled Beryl Bainbridge of her muse. "If anything I toned him down.".

== Reception ==
Katha Pollitt in The New York Times described the novel as being both witty and subtly and ominously grotesque, she finishes her review with "This is a strange, sly novel with a great deal to say about the mixture of resentment and dependency often mistaken for love."

== Publication history ==
- 1975, UK, Gerald Duckworth, ISBN 0-7156-0927-0, Hardback
- 1976, US, George Braziller, ISBN 0-8076-0816-5, Pub date Mar 1976, Hardback
- 1976, UK, Fontana, ISBN 0-00-614309-1, Pub date 30 Sep 1976, Paperback
- 1977, US, Signet, ISBN 0-451-07525-0, Pub date 06 Apr 1977, Paperback
- 1979, UK, Fontana, ISBN 0-00-615589-8, Paperback
- 1986, UK, Flamingo, ISBN 0-00-654175-5, Pub date 13 Nov 1986, Hardback
- 1992, UK, Penguin, ISBN 0-14-015697-6, Pub date 24 Sep 1992, Paperback
- 2013, UK, Virago, ISBN 1-84408-862-6, Pub date 07 Mar 2013, Paperback
