= Injury Time (novel) =

1977 novel by Beryl Bainbridge

- First edition (UK)
- Author: Beryl Bainbridge
- Language: English
- Publisher: Duckworth (UK); George Braziller (US)
- Publication date: 1977
- Publication place: United Kingdom
- Media type: Print & Audio & eBook
- Pages: 158
- ISBN: 0-7156-1246-8

Injury Time is a novel by English author Beryl Bainbridge and first published in 1977 by Duckworth. It won the 1977 Whitbread Book of the Year Award.

== Plot introduction ==
Edward Freeman is married to Helen but has an affair with Binny. The lovers are holding their first dinner party, although Edward has promised his wife that he will not be home late. Edward also invites his friend Simpson and Simpson’s wife, Muriel to Binny's house. Unfortunately, things don't go as planned, and the dinner party is gate-crashed by desperate bank-robbers wielding sawn-off shotguns and seeking hostages.
