= Gaby Wood =

English journalist and literary critic (born 1971)

Gaby Wood Hon. FRSL
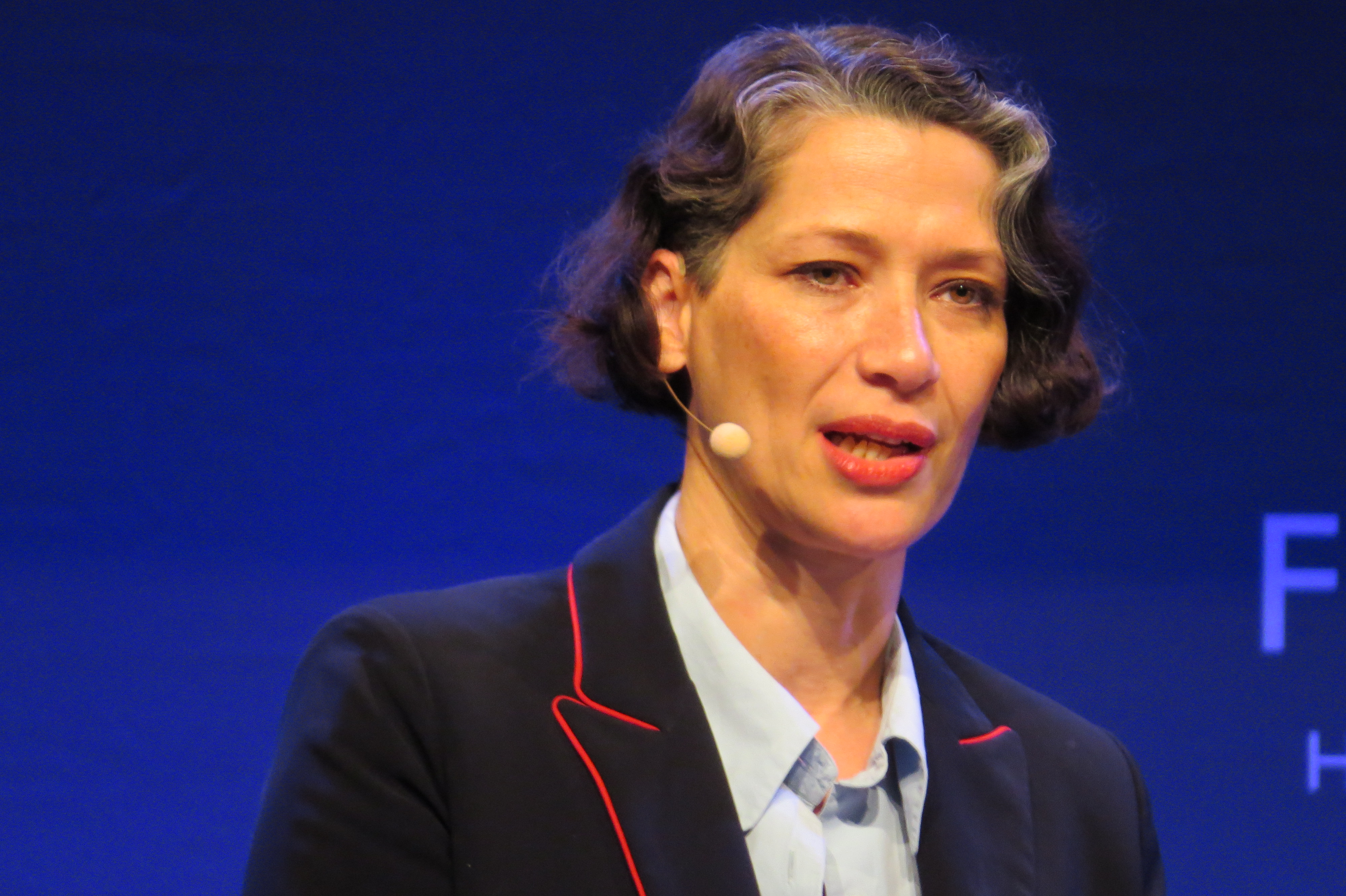
- Wood at the 2023 Hay Festival
- Born: 1971 (age 54–55)
- Education: University of Cambridge
- Occupations: Journalist, literary critic, author
- Known for: Literary director of the Booker Prize Foundation
- Parent: Michael Wood (father)

Gaby Wood (born 1971) is an English journalist, author and literary critic who has written for publications including The Observer, The Daily Telegraph, London Review of Books, Granta, and Vogue. She is the literary director of the Booker Prize Foundation, appointed in succession to Ion Trewin and having taken over the post at the conclusion of the prize for 2015.

== Education ==
Wood read French literature at Cambridge University, and was a recipient of the Harper-Wood Studentship from St John's College in 1999.

== Career ==
She was a journalist at The Observer from 2002, and during her time at the newspaper was deputy literary editor, arts editor, editor of the review section and New York correspondent for seven years.

Wood's book Living Dolls: A Magical History of the Quest for Mechanical Life (US edition: Edison's Eve) was published in 2002. Described by Miranda Seymour in The New York Times as a "lively, elegant and surprising book, packed with curious details and enticing anecdotes", it was shortlisted for the National Book Critics Circle Award in 2003.

Wood was awarded a 2007–2008 Cullman fellowship at the New York Public Library.

Wood was The Daily Telegraph's head of books, overseeing literature coverage, from January 2010 until 2015, and continues to write for the paper. She has also written for the London Review of Books, The Guardian, Granta, and US Vogue, among other publications, and has served as a judge for literary awards including the Man Booker Prize in 2011, Granta magazine's Best of Young British Novelists, the Jerwood Award, the Geoffrey Faber Memorial Prize (2013), and the Bookseller Industry Awards.

Wood was announced as literary director of the Booker Prize Foundation in April 2015, a few weeks after the death of her predecessor Ion Trewin (who had held the role since 2006, taking over from Martyn Goff, who ran the prize for three decades).

In July 2021, Wood was elected an honorary Fellow of the Royal Society of Literature.

== Personal life ==
Wood is the daughter of Michael Wood, Professor Emeritus in English at Princeton University, and has described herself as "half-Mexican, half-British ... growing up in Mexico and England". She has two daughters.

== Selected bibliography ==
- The Smallest of All Persons Mentioned in the Records of Littleness, Profile Books, 1998 ISBN 978-1861970886.
- Living Dolls: A Magical History of the Quest for Mechanical Life, Faber and Faber, 2002, ISBN 978-0571178797; paperback 2003, ISBN 978-0571214662.
  - US edition: Edison's Eve: A Magical History of the Quest for Mechanical Life, Alfred A. Knopf, 2002, ISBN 978-0679451129; Anchor Books, 2003, ISBN 978-1400031580.
