= The Birthday Boys =

1991 novel by Beryl Bainbridge

- First edition
- Author: Beryl Bainbridge
- Language: English
- Genre: Historical novel
- Publisher: Gerald Duckworth and Company
- Publication date: 5 December 1991
- Publication place: United Kingdom
- Media type: Print (Hardback & Paperback)
- Pages: 200 pp
- ISBN: 0-7156-2378-8
- OCLC: 25110855

The Birthday Boys is a novel by Beryl Bainbridge. First published in 1991, this book tells the story of Captain Robert Scott's 1910-13 expedition to Antarctica.

== Plot introduction ==
Five first-person narratives give different perspectives on the voyage: Petty Officer Taff Evans; the ship's scholar, medic, and biologist Dr. Edward Wilson; Robert Falcon Scott; Lieutenant Henry Bowers; and Captain Lawrence Oates each give their account of the hardships, the problems, and finally the failure of their endeavour: Norwegian explorer Roald Amundsen beats them to the South Pole by a month.

== Major themes ==
Beryl Bainbridge's book unites many features which have come to be seen as typical of Postmodernism: The five tales differ greatly and it is clear that readers are expected to make up their own minds as to the extent of "truth" in historical accounts of the events.

Post-modernist literature often tries to subvert the assumption that there is a definite distinction between the imagined and the real. Traditionally, historiography is concerned with the domain of "truth" and "reality" and literature, on the other hand, deals with the "imaginative". The Birthday Boys blurs the borders between "fact" and "fiction".
