= Alan Sharp =

Scottish novelist and screenwriter

- Born: 12 January 1934; Alyth, Scotland
- Died: 8 February 2013 (aged 79); Los Angeles, California, United States
- Occupations: Novelist, screenwriter
- Children: 6
- Relatives: Jack Perry (grandson)

Alan Sharp (12 January 1934 – 8 February 2013) was a Scottish novelist and screenwriter. He published two novels in the 1960s, and subsequently wrote the screenplays for about twenty films, mostly produced in the United States.

According to one obituary, "his best-known narratives created and then disassembled audience expectations about all the usual Hollywood verities, especially the triumph of justice, love and friendship."

== Biography ==
=== Early life ===
Sharp was born Alan Foote in Alyth, Perthshire, the son of a single mother, Ethel Pretoria Foote, a hairdresser and dressmaker in Lochee, Dundee. His father was Peter Fenton Craig. He was adopted at the age of six weeks by Joseph and Margaret Sharp, a shipyard worker and his wife who were members of the Salvation Army church, and raised in Greenock.

Alan left school at 14 to apprentice in the yards, the first of a long series of odd jobs. He also worked as assistant to a private detective, as an English teacher in Germany, construction laborer, dishwasher, night switchboard operator for a burglar alarm firm, packer for a carpet company, and had a role at IBM. From 1952 to 1954, he did his National Service.

When he left the army he returned to Greenock, got married and intended to train as a teacher. However, when his college grant arrived, he gave the money to his wife and left for Germany. He then relocated to London with the intention of becoming a writer.

=== Career ===
One of Sharp's screenplays was broadcast on British television in 1963, and his play A Knight in Tarnished Armour, based on his time on the docks, was broadcast in 1965.

His first novel, A Green Tree in Gedde, was published in 1965 to acclaim and won the 1967 Scottish Arts Council Award. It was banned in Edinburgh's public libraries for a time due to its sexual content.

It was the first part of a proposed trilogy, and Sharp published the second novel, The Wind Shifts, in 1967. The third novel, which had the working title The Apple Pickers, was left incomplete when Sharp emigrated to Hollywood and focused on screenwriting.

Sharp married for a second time and also had a relationship with the novelist Beryl Bainbridge, with whom he had a daughter, Ruth. Bainbridge later said, "He showed up for Rudi's birth, but then went downstairs saying he was going to get a book out of the car and never came back."

=== Screenwriting ===
When Sharp moved to Hollywood, he said he was interested in writing detective and Western films. "They satisfied some requirements of detachment from personal content and yet allowed me to write about themes that interested me," he said.

He wrote The Last Run, which he called "an attempt to use the melodramatic crime chase to deal with whatever the hero's preoccupations might be." He then wrote a series of Westerns, such as Ulzana's Raid and Billy Two Hats. He called Night Moves "an attempt to use the classic detective format, the private eye, and then set him in a landscape in which he was unable to solve the case."

=== TV movies ===
From the 1980s, most of Sharp's screenplays were for American television productions. His 1993 television screenplay (with Walter Klenhard) for The Last Hit was nominated for the Edgar Allan Poe Award (best TV feature or miniseries). His feature film projects included The Osterman Weekend (Sam Peckinpah's swan song in 1982), Rob Roy (1995), and Dean Spanley (2008).

He lived for a number of years in New Zealand on Kawau Island, but moved back to Scotland in 2000. In 1996, Peter Broughan announced that he and Sharp would be making two further feature films together, Vain Glory about Christopher Marlowe and Confessions of a Justified Sinner; neither was made, nor was a film Sharp wrote about Scottish poet Robert Burns.

== Personal life ==
The actress Rudi Davies is the daughter of Sharp and novelist Beryl Bainbridge, who used Sharp as the inspiration for the main character in the novel Sweet William (1975). Sharp was also one inspiration for Sometimes She'll Dance, by Brian Pendreigh, originally published as a short story in 2012 and used in a revised form as the concluding part of his novel The Man in the Seventh Row and Related Stories of the Human Condition in 2020.

A second daughter, Rachel Minnie Sharp, also briefly an actress, was married to Luke Perry.

Sharp was survived by his fourth wife, Harriet Sharp, and a total of six children, two stepsons and 14 grandchildren, including professional wrestler Jack Perry.

== Reception ==
According to one obituary of Sharp, "He never quite became a household name. He had a life and a lifestyle he enjoyed and that seemed to be enough. He had a huge talent, but sometimes seemed to lack ambition, or was reluctant to commit himself or seemed afflicted with doubt about his own abilities, dismissing his work as 'pastiche'."

In the 1970s, six of Sharp's screenplays became high-profile Hollywood feature films, most of them dealing with quintessentially American themes and characters. Walter Chaw writes of Sharp's screenplays from this period, "On the strength of his scripts for The Hired Hand, Ulzana's Raid, and Night Moves, Scottish novelist Alan Sharp seems well at home with the better-known, more highly regarded writers and directors of the New American Cinema. Sharp's screenplays are marked by a narrative complexity and situations gravid with implication and doom."

Trevor Johnston has written that "There's an argument to suggest that a certain seventysomething Scot could well be Britain's greatest living screenwriter. Much is made of pre-Star Wars '70s Hollywood as a kind of celluloid golden age, and Alan Sharp was there in the thick of it, working with the very best, generating the sort of track record few British screenwriters are likely to match."

David N. Meyer has incorporated an appreciation of Sharp's writing in his review of Night Moves (directed by Arthur Penn in 1975). Following a description of an important seduction scene from the film, Meyer adds: "These delicious, poisonous moments – these cookies full of arsenic – come courtesy of Alan Sharp's venomous, entrapping, perfectly circular screenplay. It's hard not to regard him – rather than Penn – as the engine of Night Moves' enduring power. Sharp had an unbroken forty year career writing features and television."

Quentin Curtis called the screenplay for Rob Roy "one of the best screenplays in the last decade".

== Archives ==
Following Sharp's death, his friend Brian Cox requested that his widow Harriet gather his papers together. She herself died before these could be collected in New Zealand, but Sharp's papers are now held by Archive Services at the University of Dundee. The collection includes original screenplays, unpublished works and personal and professional correspondence.

== Selected credits ==
- First Night – episode "Funny Noises with Their Mouths" (1963) – writer – starred Michael Caine, Ian McShane
- The Wednesday Play – episode "A Knight in Tarnished Armour" (1965) – writer
- Double Image – episode "Home and Away" (1966) – writer
- ITV Playhouse – episode "A Sound from the Sea" (1970) – writer
- Play for Today – episode "The Long Distance Piano Player" (1970) – writer
- The Last Run (1971) – writer
- The Hired Hand (1971) – writer
- Ulzana's Raid (1972) – writer, associate producer
- Billy Two Hats (1974) – writer
- Night Moves (1975) – writer
- Damnation Alley (1977) – writer
- Coming Out of the Ice (1982) – writer
- The Year of Living Dangerously (1982) – writer (uncredited)
- The Osterman Weekend (1983) – writer
- Little Treasure (1985) – writer, director
- The Edge (1989) – writer
- Love and Lies (1990) – writer
- Descending Angel (1990) – writer
- Mission of the Shark: The Saga of the U.S.S. Indianapolis (1991) – writer
- The Last Hit (1993) – writer
- Betrayed by Love (1994) – writer
- Rob Roy (1995) – writer
- Little Girl Fly Away (1998) – writer
- Lathe of Heaven (2002) – writer
- Reversible Errors (2004) – writer
- While I Was Gone (2004) – writer
- Avenger (2006) – writer
- Nightmares & Dreamscapes: From the Stories of Stephen King – episode "The Fifth Quarter" (2006)
- My Talks with Dean Spanley (2008) – writer, executive producer
- Ben Hur (2010) – writer

== Bibliography ==
- A Green Tree in Gedde (New ed.). Richard Drew. 1985. ISBN 978-0-86267-129-7. OCLC 59871279. Re-issue of Sharp's 1965 novel.
- The Wind Shifts. London: Michael Joseph. 1967. ISBN 978-0-450-00362-2. OCLC 758296950.
- The Hired Hand. Bantam Books. 1971. ISBN 978-0-552-08772-8. OCLC 252406292.
- Night Moves. Warner Paperback Library. 1975. ISBN 978-0-446-76626-5. OCLC 466207452.
- Lord Dunsany (2008). Dean Spanley: The Novel. Harper. ISBN 978-0-00-729045-1. OCLC 606056670. Film tie-in incorporating the original 1936 novella and Sharp's screenplay.
