= New Zealand official publications =

New Zealand official publications are frequently quoted by their abbreviation; they include those listed below. Past copies of most by year or session are held in bound volumes in major public libraries.

== AJHR, AtoJs, or Appendix to the Journal of the House of Representatives ==
The Appendix to the Journal of the House of Representatives is published annually or by each sitting of Parliament. It includes annual reports of government departments, and various special reports e.g. reports of commissions or Royal Commissions.

Most of the 1860 to 1950 volumes of AJHR have been digitised and are available online at AtoJsOnline.

== NZOYB or New Zealand Official Yearbook ==
The New Zealand Official Yearbook was published annually from 1893 to 2012. It provided a wide range of statistical and general information about New Zealand. It covered various aspects of the country, including its demographics, economy, society and government.

== NZG or New Zealand Gazettes ==
The New Zealand Gazette is published weekly. In the 19th century the New Ulster Gazette, the New Munster Gazette and gazettes of the various provinces were also published.

== NZPD or New Zealand Parliamentary Debates ==
The New Zealand Parliamentary Debates (Hansard) is published daily when Parliament is in session. Available online, see Hansard.

== AJLC or Appendix to the Journal of the Legislative Council ==
Published up to 1951, when the Legislative Council of New Zealand (the Upper House) was abolished.
