= Martyn Goff =

British literary administrator and author (1923–2015)

Martyn Goff CBE
- Born: 7 June 1923
- Died: 25 March 2015 (aged 92)
- Education: Clifton College; Oxford University
- Occupations: Literary administrator, author and bookseller

Martyn Goff, CBE (7 June 1923 – 25 March 2015) was a British literary administrator, author and bookseller. He made a significant contribution to the organisation and popularity of the Booker Prize for many years, and was involved in efforts to increase literacy and book ownership, particularly among children.

== Background ==
Born in 1923, he grew up in Hampstead, London. His father, Jacob Gulkov (anglicised: Gee Morton Goff), was a Russian fur dealer who had emigrated to Britain and became a supplier to department stores. After studying at Clifton College in Bristol, he won a place at Oxford University to study English. Goff was demobilised in 1946.

== Personal life and honours ==
Goff is said to have acquired, and relished, a reputation as a dandy. His partner, Rubio Tapani Lindroos, a Finnish poet who moved to London in 1970, died in 2014.

Goff was appointed an Officer of the Order of the British Empire (OBE) in 1977 and promoted to Commander of the Order of the British Empire (CBE) in 2005. In 2003, Oxford Brookes University awarded him an honorary doctorate.
