= Ossie Mazengarb =

New Zealand barrister (1890–1963)

The Honourable Ossie Mazengarb CBE QC
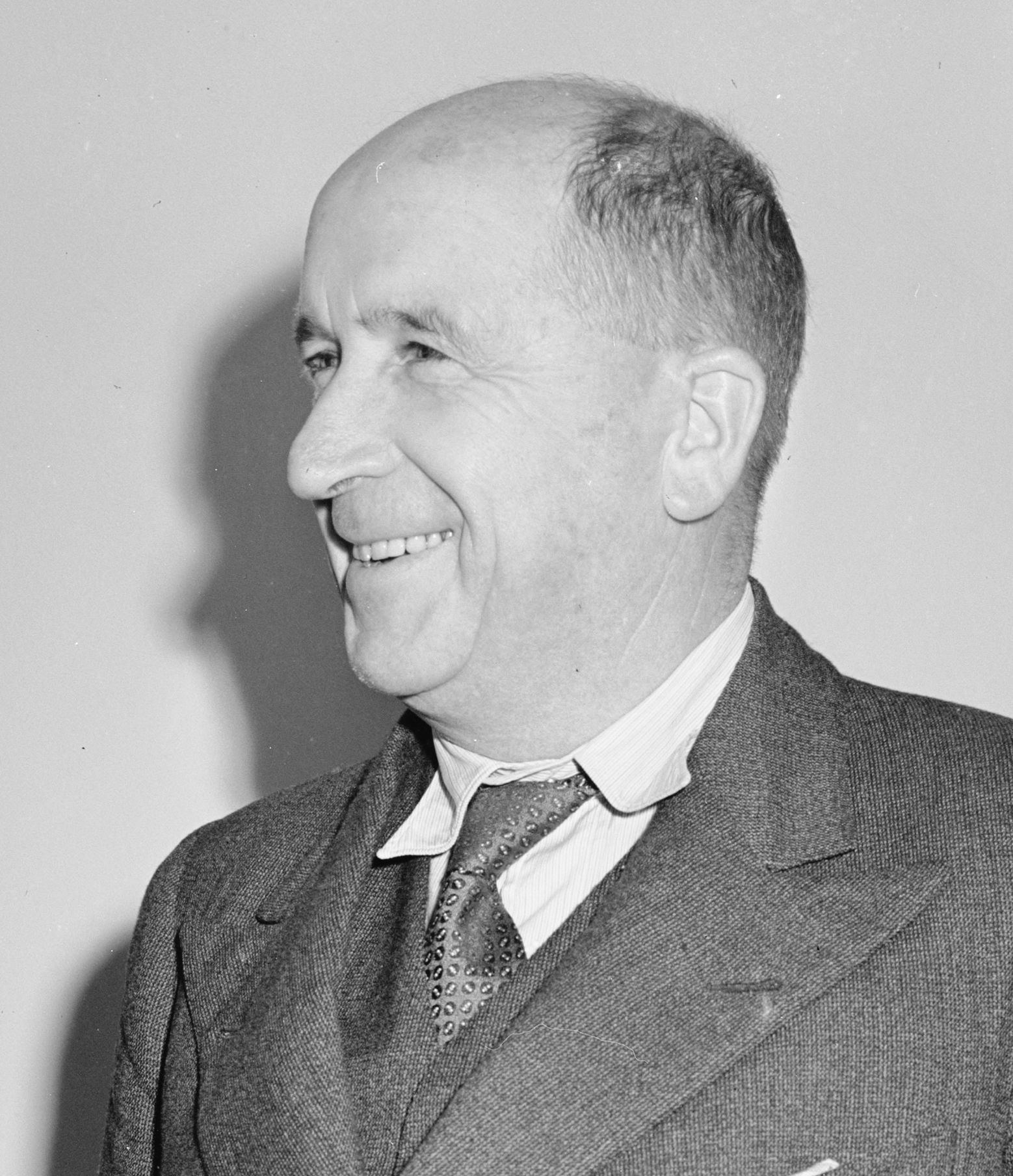
- Mazengarb in 1950

Member of the New Zealand Legislative Council
- In office 22 June 1950 – 31 December 1950

Personal details
- Born: Oswald Chettle Mazengarb; 31 May 1890 Prahran, Victoria, Australia
- Died: 27 November 1963 (aged 73) Wellington, New Zealand
- Spouse: Margaret Isabel Campbell (m. 1920)
- Profession: Barrister

Oswald Chettle Mazengarb CBE QC (31 May 1890 – 27 November 1963), known as Ossie Mazengarb, was a New Zealand barrister.

== Biography ==
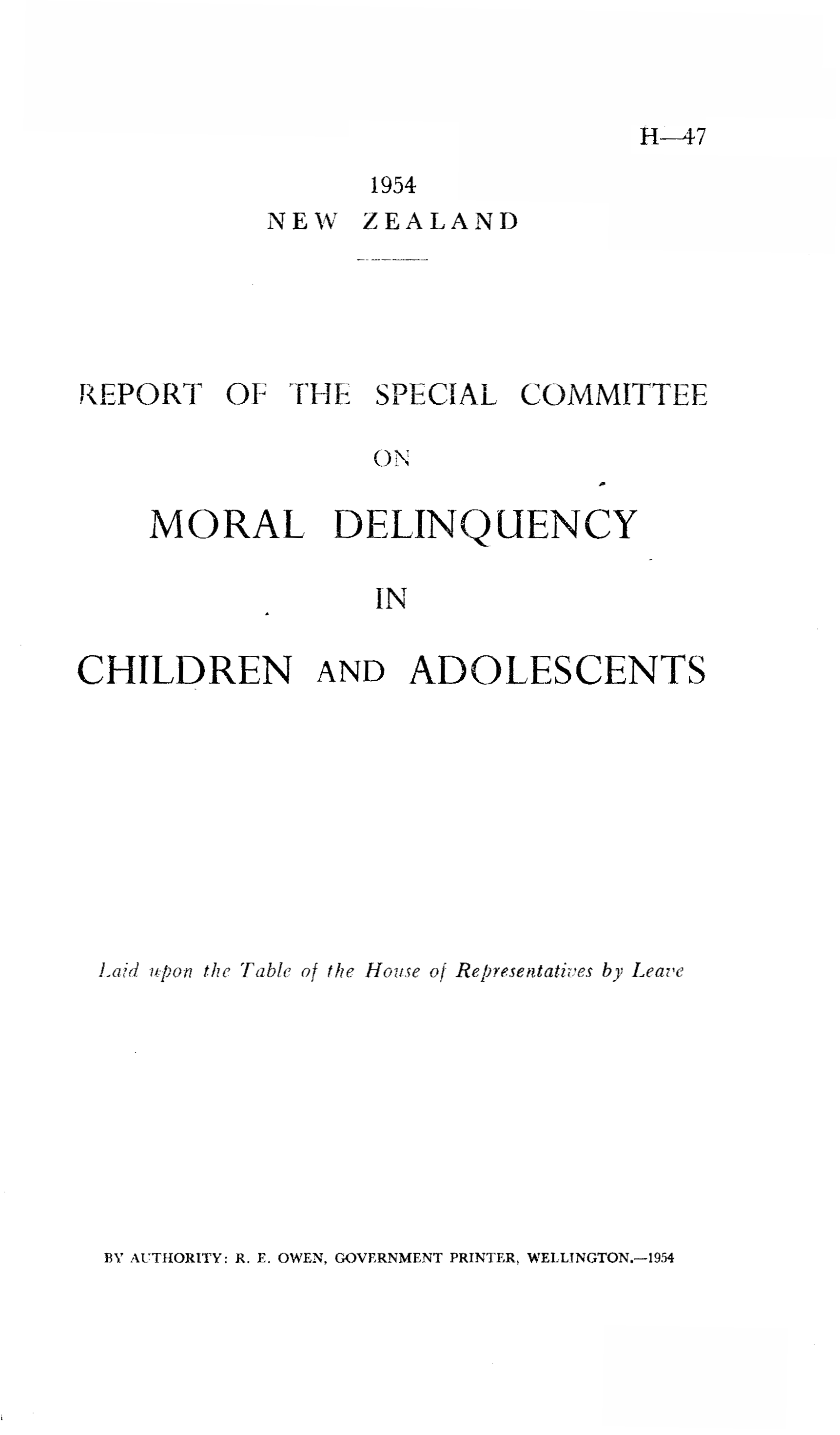
Cover page of the Report of the Special Committee on Moral Delinquency in Children and Adolescents, 1954, known as the Mazengarb Report

Mazengarb was born in Prahran, a suburb of Melbourne, in 1890. His family moved to Dunedin soon after his birth and he received his education at Otago Boys' High School, which he attended from 1903 to 1905. From 1908 to 1911, he studied for a Bachelor of Arts at Otago University. A scholarship in political economy enabled him to study a further year and he graduated with a Master of Arts in 1912. He then moved to Wellington to study law at Victoria College and obtained a Bachelor of Laws in 1914 and a Master of Laws in 1917. He was a member of the debating club at both universities.

In 1914, Mazengarb was admitted to the bar. He formed a partnership with John Barton in 1915. Barton was appointed magistrate in Gisborne and had to dissolve the partnership. Mazengarb was joined by Ernst Peterson Hay and Robert Macalister and their practice soon rose to one of the largest in the capital city.

Mazengarb wrote a few legal textbooks. Aside from his legal and judicial careers, he was also a politician. For 16 years he was the president of the Reform Union, Wellington's junior branch of the Reform Party which later became the National Union, the intermediate section of the Wellington National Party from 1935 to 1951. He stood as a candidate for the United–Reform Coalition government in the 1935 election in the Wellington East electorate, and for National in the 1938 election in the Wellington Suburbs electorate. He was appointed in 1950 as one of the so-called suicide squad in the Legislative Council to vote for its abolition.

Alongside Alfred North, Mazengarb was appointed King's Counsel on 18 April 1947. In the 1953 Coronation Honours, Mazengarb was appointed a Commander of the Order of the British Empire, for charitable and public services, especially in the field of law.

A well-known public appointment was in 1954, by the National government of the time, to chair the Special Committee on Moral Delinquency in Children and Adolescents, otherwise better known as the Mazengarb Report.

On 6 April 1920 at St John's Church in Invercargill, Mazengarb married Margaret Isabel Campbell. The couple had three daughters. Mazengarb died in Wellington on 27 November 1963.

Mazengarb was well known for his voluntary and philanthropic involvement in organisations such as the New Zealand Hemophilia Society, Wellington Rose Society, Kelliher Art Competition Trust, New Zealand Road Safety Council, Masonic Grand Lodge, and participation on the Board of Governors at Queen Margaret College. By far his most notable contribution was to the establishment of Heritage Incorporated, colloquially known as the Heritage Movement. A year before his death in 1963 the lawyer published The Story of Heritage: An Epic of Accomplishment through Faith and an Earnest of More to be Done on the work of the movement.

== Publications (partial list) ==
- The law relating to negligence on the highway (first edition, Wellington: Butterworth, 1942; second edition, Sydney: Butterworth, 1952)
- Advocacy in our time (London and Wellington: Sweet and Maxwell, 1964)
- Mazengarb's negligence on the highway: law and practice in Australia, third edition (Sydney: Butterworths, 1957)
- Mazengarb's law and practice relating to actions for negligence on the highway, fourth edition (Sydney: Butterworths, 1962)
- The Story of Heritage: An Epic of Accomplishment through Faith and an Earnest of More to be Done (Dunedin: Reed, 1962)
- Report of the Special Committee on Moral Delinquency in Children and Adolescents (Wellington: Government Printer, 1954) [chairperson] (Project Gutenberg edition also available)

== See also ==
- List of King's and Queen's Counsel in New Zealand
