= Sweet William (film) =

- Directed by: Claude Whatham
- Written by: Beryl Bainbridge
- Based on: novel by Beryl Bainbridge
- Produced by: Jeremy Watt
- Starring: Sam Waterston; Jenny Agutter
- Cinematography: Les Young
- Edited by: Peter Coulson
- Production company: Kendon Films
- Release date: April 1980
- Running time: 92 minutes
- Country: United Kingdom
- Language: English

Sweet William is a 1980 British drama film directed by Claude Whatham, executive produced by Don Boyd and starring Sam Waterston, Jenny Agutter, Anna Massey, Arthur Lowe, Geraldine James, Daphne Oxenford, Tim Pigott-Smith and Melvyn Bragg. It is based on the 1975 novel of the same title by Beryl Bainbridge.

== Cast ==
- Sam Waterston - William McClusky
- Jenny Agutter - Ann Walton
- Anna Massey - Edna McClusky
- Arthur Lowe - Captain Walton
- Geraldine James - Pamela
- Daphne Oxenford - Mrs. Walton
- Peter Dean - Roddy
- Rachel Bell - Mrs. Kershaw
- Tim Pigott-Smith - Gerald
- Melvyn Bragg - Himself

== Production ==
The film was part of a slate of five films worth £3 million produced by Don Boyd, who called the movie "a comedy of modern relationships".
