= Booker Prize =

British literary award

The Booker Prize
- Awarded for: Best work of sustained fiction of the year, written in English and published in the UK or Ireland
- Location: Somerset House, Strand, London, England
- Country: United Kingdom
- Presented by: Booker, McConnell Ltd (1969–2001); Man Group (2002–2019); Crankstart (2019 onwards)
- Reward: £50,000
- First award: 1969; 57 years ago
- Website: www.thebookerprizes.com

The Booker Prize, formerly the Booker Prize for Fiction (1969–2001) and the Man Booker Prize (2002–2019), is a literary award conferred each year for the best single work of sustained English fiction which was published in the United Kingdom or Ireland. It is regarded as one of the most prestigious literary awards, and the winner receives £50,000, as well as international publicity that usually leads to a significant sales boost. When the prize was created, only novels written by Commonwealth, Irish and South African (and later Zimbabwean) citizens were eligible to receive the prize; in 2014, eligibility was widened to any English-language novel—a change that proved controversial.

A five-person panel of authors, publishers and journalists, as well as politicians, actors, artists and musicians, is appointed by the Booker Prize Foundation each year to choose the winning book. Gaby Wood has been the chief executive of the Booker Prize Foundation since 2015.

A high-profile literary award in British culture, the Booker Prize is greeted with anticipation and fanfare around the world. Literary critics have noted that it is a mark of distinction for authors to be selected for inclusion in the shortlist or to be nominated for the "longlist".

A sister prize, the International Booker Prize, is awarded for a work of fiction translated into English and published in the United Kingdom or Ireland. Unlike the Booker Prize, short story collections are eligible for the International Booker Prize. The £50,000 prize money is split evenly between the author and translator of the winning book. A third award, the Children's Booker Prize, was launched in 2025, with the inaugural winner to be announced in 2027.

== History and administration ==
The prize was established as the "Booker Prize for Fiction" after the company Booker, McConnell Ltd began sponsoring the event in 1969 with the first award ceremony being held that year on Tuesday, 22 April, at Drapers' Hall on Throgmorton Street in the City of London; it became commonly known as the "Booker Prize" or the "Booker". Jock Campbell, Charles Tyrrell and Tom Maschler were instrumental in establishing the prize.

When administration of the prize was transferred to the Booker Prize Foundation in 2002, the title sponsor became the investment company Man Group, which opted to retain "Booker" as part of the official title of the prize. The foundation is an independent registered charity funded by the entire profits of Booker Prize Trading Ltd, of which it is the sole shareholder. The prize money awarded with the Booker Prize was originally £5,000. It doubled in 1978 to £10,000 and was subsequently raised to £50,000 in 2002 under the sponsorship of the Man Group, making it one of the world's richest literary prizes. Each of the shortlisted authors receives £2,500 and a specially bound edition of their book.

The original Booker Prize trophy was designed by the artist Jan Pieńkowski and the design was revived for the 2023 prize.

=== 1969–1979 ===
The first winner of the Booker Prize was P. H. Newby in 1969 for his novel Something to Answer For. W. L. Webb, The Guardian's Literary Editor, was chair of the inaugural set of judges, which included Rebecca West, Stephen Spender, Frank Kermode and David Farrer.

In 1970, the prize's second year, Bernice Rubens became the first woman to win the Booker Prize, for The Elected Member.

The rules of the Booker changed in 1971; previously, it had been given retrospectively, to books published in the year prior to each award. In 1971, eligibility was changed to make the year of a novel's publication the same as the year of the award, which was made in November; in effect, this meant that books published in 1970 were not considered for the Booker in either year. Forty years later, the Booker Prize Foundation announced in January 2010 the creation of a special award called the "Lost Man Booker Prize", with the winner chosen from a longlist of 22 novels published in 1970. The prize was won by J. G. Farrell for Troubles, though the author had died in 1979.

In 1972, winning writer John Berger, known for his Marxist worldview, protested during his acceptance speech against Booker McConnell. He blamed Booker's 130 years of sugar production in the Caribbean for the region's modern poverty. Berger donated half of his £5,000 prize to the British Black Panther movement, because it had a socialist and revolutionary perspective in agreement with his own.

=== 1980–1999 ===
In 1980, Anthony Burgess, writer of Earthly Powers, refused to attend the ceremony unless it was confirmed to him in advance whether he had won. His was one of two books considered likely to win, the other being Rites of Passage by William Golding. The judges decided only 30 minutes before the ceremony, giving the prize to Golding. Both novels had been seen as favourites to win leading up to the prize, and the dramatic "literary battle" between two senior writers made front-page news.

Alice Munro's The Beggar Maid was shortlisted in 1980, and remains the only short-story collection to be shortlisted (although another short-story collection, Banu Mushtaq's Heart Lamp: Selected Stories, later won the International Booker Prize in 2025).

In 1981, nominee John Banville wrote a letter to The Guardian requesting that the prize be given to him so that he could use the money to buy every copy of the longlisted books in Ireland and donate them to libraries, "thus ensuring that the books not only are bought but also read – surely a unique occurrence". The prize was eventually won by Salman Rushdie's Midnight's Children.

Judging for the 1983 award produced a draw between J. M. Coetzee's Life & Times of Michael K and Salman Rushdie's Shame, leaving chair of judges Fay Weldon to choose between the two. According to Stephen Moss in The Guardian, "Her arm was bent and she chose Rushdie", only to change her mind as the result was being phoned through. At the award ceremony, Fay Weldon used her speech to attack the assembled publishers, accusing them of exploiting and undervaluing authors. "I will ask you if in your dealings with authors you are really being fair, and honourable, and right? Or merely getting away with what you can? If you are not careful, you will kill the goose that lays your golden eggs."

In 1992, the jury split the prize between Michael Ondaatje's The English Patient and Barry Unsworth's Sacred Hunger. This prompted the foundation to draw up a rule that made it mandatory for the appointed jury to make the award to just a single author/book.

The choice of James Kelman's book How Late It Was, How Late as 1994 Booker Prize winner proved to be one of the most controversial in the award's history. Rabbi Julia Neuberger, one of the judges, declared it "a disgrace" and left the event, later deeming the book to be "crap"; WHSmith's marketing manager called the award "an embarrassment to the whole book trade"; Waterstones in Glasgow sold a mere 13 copies of Kelman's book the following week. In 1994, The Guardian's literary editor Richard Gott, citing the lack of objective criteria and the exclusion of American authors, described the prize as "a significant and dangerous iceberg in the sea of British culture that serves as a symbol of its current malaise".

In 1996, A. L. Kennedy served as a judge; in 2001, she called the prize "a pile of crooked nonsense" with the winner determined by "who knows who, who's sleeping with who, who's selling drugs to who, who's married to who, whose turn it is".

In 1997, the decision to award Arundhati Roy's The God of Small Things proved controversial. Carmen Callil, chair of the previous year's Booker judges, called it an "execrable" book and said on television that it should not even have been on the shortlist. Booker Prize chairman Martyn Goff said Roy won because nobody objected, following the rejection by the judges of Bernard MacLaverty's shortlisted book due to their dismissal of him as "a wonderful short-story writer and that Grace Notes was three short stories strung together".

In 1999, J. M. Coetzee became the first author to win the Booker Prize for a second time. Coetzee was the first of four writers to have won the Booker Prize twice, the others being Peter Carey, Hilary Mantel, and Margaret Atwood.

=== 2000–2019 ===
Before 2001, each year's longlist of nominees was not publicly revealed. From 2001, the longlisted novels started to be published each year, and in 2007 the number of nominees was capped at 12 or 13 each year.

John Sutherland, who was a judge for the 1999 prize, was reported as saying in 2001:

There is a well-established London literary community. Rushdie doesn't get shortlisted now because he has attacked that community. That is not a good game plan if you want to win the Booker. Norman Mailer has found the same thing in the US – you have to "be a citizen" if you want to win prizes. The real scandal is that [Martin] Amis has never won the prize. In fact, he has only been shortlisted once and that was for Time's Arrow, which was not one of his strongest books. That really is suspicious. He pissed people off with Dead Babies and that gets lodged in the culture. There is also the feeling that he has always looked towards America.

The Booker Prize created a permanent home for the archives from 1968 to present at Oxford Brookes University Library. The Archive, which encompasses the administrative history of the Prize from 1968 to date, collects together a diverse range of material, including correspondence, publicity material, copies of both the Longlists and the Shortlists, minutes of meetings, photographs and material relating to the awards dinner (letters of invitation, guest lists, seating plans). Embargoes of ten or twenty years apply to certain categories of material; examples include all material relating to the judging process and the Longlist prior to 2002.

Between 2005 and 2008, the Booker Prize alternated between writers from Ireland and India. "Outsider" John Banville began this trend in 2005 when his novel The Sea was selected as a surprise winner: Boyd Tonkin, literary editor of The Independent, famously condemned it as "possibly the most perverse decision in the history of the award" and rival novelist Tibor Fischer poured scorn on Banville's victory. Kiran Desai of India won in 2006. Anne Enright's 2007 victory came about due to a jury split over Ian McEwan's novel On Chesil Beach. The following year it was India's turn again, with Aravind Adiga narrowly defeating Enright's fellow Irishman Sebastian Barry.

2015 logo of the then Man Booker Prize

Historically, the winner of the Booker Prize was required to be a citizen of the Commonwealth of Nations, the Republic of Ireland, or Zimbabwe. It was announced on 18 September 2013 that future Booker Prize awards would consider authors from anywhere in the world, so long as their work was in English and published in the United Kingdom or Ireland. This change proved controversial in literary circles. Former winner A. S. Byatt and former judge John Mullan said the prize risked diluting its identity, whereas former judge A. L. Kennedy welcomed the change. Following this expansion, the first winner not from the Commonwealth, Ireland, or Zimbabwe was American Paul Beatty in 2016. Another American, George Saunders, won the following year. In 2018, publishers sought to reverse the change, arguing that the inclusion of American writers would lead to homogenisation, reducing diversity and opportunities everywhere, including in America, to learn about "great books that haven't already been widely heralded".

Man Group announced in early 2019 that the year's prize would be the last of eighteen under their sponsorship. A new sponsor, Crankstart – a charitable foundation run by Sir Michael Moritz and his wife, Harriet Heyman – then announced it would sponsor the award for five years, with the option to renew for another five years. The award title was changed to simply "The Booker Prize".

In 2019, despite having been unequivocally warned against doing so, the foundation's jury – under the chair Peter Florence – split the prize, awarding it to two authors, in breach of a rule established in 1993. Florence justified the decision, saying: "We came down to a discussion with the director of the Booker Prize about the rules. And we were told quite firmly that the rules state that you can only have one winner ... and as we have managed the jury all the way through on the principle of consensus, our consensus was that it was our decision to flout the rules and divide this year's prize to celebrate two winners." The two were British writer Bernardine Evaristo for her novel Girl, Woman, Other and Canadian writer Margaret Atwood for The Testaments. Evaristo's win marked the first time the Booker had been awarded to a black woman, while Atwood's win, at 79, made her the oldest winner. Atwood had also previously won the prize in 2000.

=== 2020–present ===
In 2020, due to the COVID-19 pandemic, the annual award ceremony was replaced with a livestream from the Roundhouse in London, without the shortlisted authors in attendance. The winner was Douglas Stuart for his debut novel Shuggie Bain, which had been rejected by more than 30 publishers.

2021's small-scale ceremony, once again impacted by COVID-19, saw South African writer Damon Galgut, who had been shortlisted in 2003 and 2010, win the prize for The Promise.

2022 saw a re-imagined winner ceremony at the Roundhouse, hosted by comedian Sophie Duker and featuring a keynote speech by singer Dua Lipa. The prize was won by Sri Lankan author Shehan Karunatilaka for his second novel, The Seven Moons of Maali Almeida.

In 2023, for the first time, the shortlist featured three writers named Paul (Paul Lynch, Paul Murray and Paul Harding). The prize was won by Irish writer Paul Lynch for his novel Prophet Song. In the media, reaction was mixed. In The Guardian, Justine Jordan wrote that "This is a novel written to jolt the reader awake to truths we mostly cannot bear to admit", while in The Daily Telegraph, Cal Revely-Calder wrote that Prophet Song is "political fiction at its laziest" and "the weak link in a strong shortlist".

The 2024 prize was won by Samantha Harvey for Orbital, the first book set in space to win the prize and, at 136 pages, the second shortest book to win the Booker after Penelope Fitzgerald's Offshore. Harvey was also the first woman to win the Booker since 2019. Since winning the Booker, Orbital became a UK bestseller, selling more than 20,000 print copies in the UK in the week following its win, making it the fastest selling winner of the Booker Prize since records began.

The 2025 Booker Prize was won by the Hungarian-British writer David Szalay for his novel Flesh.

2026 saw the first science fiction author and oldest recipient of the prize at 81, with M John Harrison for The End of Everything. Booker Prize Foundation Chief Executive Gaby Wood noted that while other winners had written science fiction, Harrison was the first winner to be known as a science fiction author. At 198 pages the shortest on the shortlist, the novel is set on the Kent coastline and follows the protagonist and his aunt in the aftermath of a largely unexplained apocalyptic event. Chief Judge Mary Beard said that the decision was unanimous and that "One main point of the book is that if, or when, such an apocalypse comes it will be incomprehensible. And the old rules won't matter either … This is the politics of now seen through the lens of the future." The shortlist also featured Marlon James for The Disappearers, Luke Kennard for Black Bag, Rebecca Perry for May We Feed the King, Elizabeth Strout for The Things We Never Say, and Douglas Stuart for John of John.

== Judging ==
The selection process for the winner of the prize commences with the appointment of a panel of five judges, which changes each year. Gaby Wood, the chief executive of the Booker Prize Foundation, chooses the judges in consultation with an advisory committee made up of senior figures from the UK publishing industry. On rare occasions a judge may be selected a second time. Judges are selected from amongst leading literary critics, writers, academics, and public figures.

Unlike some other literary prizes, each judge is expected to read all of the books that have been submitted. In 2023, the judges read 163 books over seven months. After doing so, they select a longlist of 12 or 13 titles (the "Booker Dozen"), before each reading those books for a second time. They then select a shortlist of six titles, and read the six books a third time before selecting a winner.

The Booker judging process and the very concept of a "best book" being chosen by a small number of literary insiders is controversial for many. The Guardian introduced the "Not the Booker Prize" voted for by readers partly as a reaction to this. Author Amit Chaudhuri wrote: "The idea that a 'book of the year' can be assessed annually by a bunch of people – judges who have to read almost a book a day – is absurd, as is the idea that this is any way of honouring a writer."

The author Julian Barnes once dismissed the prize as "posh bingo" for the apparently arbitrary way winners are selected. On winning the prize in 2011 he joked that he had revised his opinion, telling reporters that he had realised "the judges are the wisest heads in literary Christendom".

For many years, the winner was announced at a formal, black-tie dinner in London's Guildhall in early October. However, in 2020, with COVID-19 pandemic restrictions in place, the winner ceremony was broadcast in November from the Roundhouse, in partnership with the BBC. The ceremony returned to the Roundhouse for a more casual in-person ceremony in 2022, before moving to Old Billingsgate in London in 2023 and 2024.

== Winners ==
Year	Author	Title	Genre(s)	Country
1969	P. H. Newby	Something to Answer For	Literary fiction	ENG
1970	Bernice Rubens	The Elected Member	Literary fiction	WAL
1971	V. S. Naipaul	In a Free State	Literary fiction	UK; TTO
1972	John Berger	G.	Experimental literature	ENG
1973	J. G. Farrell	The Siege of Krishnapur	Literary fiction	ENG; IRL
1974	Nadine Gordimer	The Conservationist	Literary fiction	(South Africa) ZAF
1974	Stanley Middleton	Holiday	Literary fiction	ENG
1975	Ruth Prawer Jhabvala	Heat and Dust	Historical fiction	UK; DE
1976	David Storey	Saville	Literary fiction	ENG
1977	Paul Scott	Staying On	Literary fiction	ENG
1978	Iris Murdoch	The Sea, the Sea	Philosophical novel	ENG; IRL
1979	Penelope Fitzgerald	Offshore	Literary fiction	ENG
1980	William Golding	Rites of Passage	Literary fiction	ENG
1981	Salman Rushdie	Midnight's Children	Magical realism	ENG
1982	Thomas Keneally	Schindler's Ark	Biographical novel	AUS
1983	J. M. Coetzee	Life & Times of Michael K	Literary fiction	(South Africa) ZAF
1984	Anita Brookner	Hotel du Lac	Literary fiction	ENG
1985	Keri Hulme	The Bone People	Literary fiction	NZL
1986	Kingsley Amis	The Old Devils	Comic novel	ENG
1987	Penelope Lively	Moon Tiger	Literary fiction	ENG
1988	Peter Carey	Oscar and Lucinda	Historical fiction	AUS
1989	Kazuo Ishiguro	The Remains of the Day	Historical fiction	ENG
1990	A. S. Byatt	Possession	Historiographic metafiction	ENG
1991	Ben Okri	The Famished Road	Magical realism	NGR
1992	Michael Ondaatje	The English Patient	Historiographic metafiction	CAN; SRI
1992	Barry Unsworth	Sacred Hunger	Historical fiction	ENG
1993	Roddy Doyle	Paddy Clarke Ha Ha Ha	Literary fiction	IRL
1994	James Kelman	How Late It Was, How Late	Stream of consciousness	SCO
1995	Pat Barker	The Ghost Road	War novel	ENG
1996	Graham Swift	Last Orders	Literary fiction	ENG
1997	Arundhati Roy	The God of Small Things	Literary fiction	IND
1998	Ian McEwan	Amsterdam	Literary fiction	ENG
1999	J. M. Coetzee	Disgrace	Literary fiction	RSA
2000	Margaret Atwood	The Blind Assassin	Historical fiction	CAN
2001	Peter Carey	True History of the Kelly Gang	Historical fiction	AUS
2002	Yann Martel	Life of Pi	Fantasy and adventure fiction	CAN
2003	DBC Pierre	Vernon God Little	Black comedy	AUS
2004	Alan Hollinghurst	The Line of Beauty	Historical fiction	ENG
2005	John Banville	The Sea	Literary fiction	IRL
2006	Kiran Desai	The Inheritance of Loss	Literary fiction	IND
2007	Anne Enright	The Gathering	Literary fiction	IRL
2008	Aravind Adiga	The White Tiger	Literary fiction	IND
2009	Hilary Mantel	Wolf Hall	Historical fiction	ENG
2010	Howard Jacobson	The Finkler Question	Comic novel	ENG
2011	Julian Barnes	The Sense of an Ending	Literary fiction	ENG
2012	Hilary Mantel	Bring Up the Bodies	Historical fiction	ENG
2013	Eleanor Catton	The Luminaries	Historical fiction	NZL
2014	Richard Flanagan	The Narrow Road to the Deep North	Historical fiction	AUS
2015	Marlon James	A Brief History of Seven Killings	Historical/experimental novel	JAM
2016	Paul Beatty	The Sellout	Satire	USA
2017	George Saunders	Lincoln in the Bardo	Historical/experimental novel	USA
2018	Anna Burns	Milkman	Literary fiction	NIR
2019	Margaret Atwood	The Testaments	Literary fiction	CAN
2019	Bernardine Evaristo	Girl, Woman, Other	Experimental literature	ENG
2020	Douglas Stuart	Shuggie Bain	Literary fiction	SCO; USA
2021	Damon Galgut	The Promise	Literary fiction	RSA
2022	Shehan Karunatilaka	The Seven Moons of Maali Almeida	Fantasy / History / Political Satire	SRI
2023	Paul Lynch	Prophet Song	Dystopian novel	IRL
2024	Samantha Harvey	Orbital	Literary fiction	ENG
2025	David Szalay	Flesh	Literary fiction	ENG; HUN
2026	M. John Harrison	The End of Everything	Post-apocalyptic fiction	ENG

== Special awards ==
In 1971, the nature of the prize was changed so that it was awarded to novels published in that year instead of in the previous year; therefore, no novel published in 1970 could win the Booker Prize. This was rectified in 2010 by the awarding of the "Lost Man Booker Prize" to J. G. Farrell's Troubles.

In 1993, a special Booker of Bookers prize was awarded to mark the prize's 25th anniversary. Three previous judges of the award, Malcolm Bradbury, David Holloway and W. L. Webb, met and chose Salman Rushdie's Midnight's Children, the 1981 winner, as "the best novel out of all the winners".

In 2006, the Man Booker Prize set up a "Best of Beryl" prize, for the author Beryl Bainbridge, who had been nominated five times and yet failed to win once. The prize is said to count as a Booker Prize. The nominees were An Awfully Big Adventure, Every Man for Himself, The Bottle Factory Outing, The Dressmaker and Master Georgie, which won.

Similarly, The Best of the Booker was awarded in 2008 to celebrate the prize's 40th anniversary. A shortlist of six winners was chosen — Rushdie's Midnight's Children, Coetzee's Disgrace, Carey's Oscar and Lucinda, Gordimer's The Conservationist, Farrell's The Siege of Krishnapur, and Barker's The Ghost Road — and the decision was left to a public vote; the winner was again Midnight's Children.

In 2018, to celebrate the 50th anniversary, the Golden Man Booker was awarded. One book from each decade was selected by a panel of judges: Naipaul's In a Free State (the 1971 winner), Lively's Moon Tiger (1987), Ondaatje's The English Patient (1992), Mantel's Wolf Hall (2009) and Saunders's Lincoln in the Bardo (2017). The winner, by popular vote, was The English Patient.

== Nomination ==
Since 2014, each publisher's imprint may submit a number of titles based on their longlisting history (previously they could submit two). Non-longlisted publishers can submit one title, publishers with one or two longlisted books in the previous five years can submit two, publishers with three or four longlisted books are allowed three submissions, and publishers with five or more longlisted books can have four submissions.

In addition, previous winners of the prize are automatically considered if they enter new titles. Books may also be called in: publishers can make written representations to the judges to consider titles in addition to those already entered. In the 21st century the average number of books considered by the judges has been approximately 130.

== Related awards ==
A separate prize for which any living writer in the world may qualify, the Man Booker International Prize, was inaugurated in 2005. Until 2015, it was given every two years to a living author of any nationality for a body of work published in English or generally available in English translation. In 2016, the award was significantly reconfigured, and is now given annually to a single book in English translation, with a £50,000 prize for the winning title, shared equally between author and translator. The award has been known as the International Booker Prize since the Man Group ended its association with the prizes in 2019.

A Russian version of the Booker Prize was created in 1992 called the Booker-Open Russia Literary Prize, also known as the Russian Booker Prize. In 2007, Man Group plc established the Man Asian Literary Prize, an annual literary award given to the best novel by an Asian writer, either written in English or translated into English, and published in the previous calendar year.

For many years, as part of The Times's Literature Festival in Cheltenham, a Booker event was held on the last Saturday of the festival. Four guest speakers/judges debated a shortlist of four books from a given year from before the introduction of the Booker Prize, and a winner was chosen. Unlike the real Booker Prize (1969 through 2014), writers from outside the Commonwealth were also considered. In 2008, the winner for 1948 was Alan Paton's Cry, the Beloved Country, beating Norman Mailer's The Naked and the Dead, Graham Greene's The Heart of the Matter and Evelyn Waugh's The Loved One. In 2015, the winner for 1915 was Ford Madox Ford's The Good Soldier, beating The Thirty-Nine Steps (John Buchan), Of Human Bondage (W. Somerset Maugham), Psmith, Journalist (P. G. Wodehouse) and The Voyage Out (Virginia Woolf).

In October 2025, the Booker Foundation announced the Children's Booker Prize, supported by AKO Foundation, for the best contemporary fiction for children aged 8-12. The inaugural prize would be awarded in 2027 and be awarded annually thereafter. The jury's first chairperson is Frank Cottrell-Boyce, who has been serving since 2024 as Children's Laureate.

== See also ==
- Baillie Gifford Prize (formerly the Samuel Johnson Prize)
- Commonwealth Writers Prize
- Costa Book Awards
- German Book Prize (Deutscher Buchpreis)
- Giller Prize (known as the Scotiabank Giller Prize from 2005 to 2023)
- Governor General's Awards
- Grand Prix of Literary Associations
- Miles Franklin Award
- Prix Goncourt
- Russian Booker Prize
- List of British literary awards
- List of literary awards
