= The Dressmaker (Bainbridge novel) =

Novel by Beryl Bainbridge

- First edition
- Author: Beryl Bainbridge
- Language: English
- Genre: Psychological Fiction
- Publisher: Duckworth (UK); George Braziller (US)
- Publication date: 1973 (UK), 1974 (US)
- Publication place: United Kingdom
- Media type: Print
- Pages: 152
- ISBN: 0-7156-0721-9
- OCLC: 746555
- LC Class: PZ4.B162 Dr PR6052.A3195

The Dressmaker (US title The Secret Glass) is a gothic psychological novel written by Beryl Bainbridge. In 1973, it was shortlisted for the Booker Prize. Like many of Bainbridge's earlier works, the novel is semi-autobiographical. In particular, the story was inspired by a relationship that she had with a soldier as a teenager. The characters of Nellie and Margo were based upon two of her paternal aunts.

== Plot ==
Set in Liverpool and Lancashire during World War II, a repressed dressmaker and her sister struggle looking after their 17-year-old niece, who is having a delusional affair with an American soldier.

== Reception ==
The Dressmaker was almost unanimously praised by critics. Karl Miller of the New York Review of Books called it "a magnificent book" about isolation and family strife. The Times Literary Supplement said that the novel was a "remarkable achievement ... Miss Bainbridge's imagination pushes her towards nightmare, and her eye for detail is macabre."

== Film adaptation ==
The novel was adapted for film in 1988 by starring Jane Horrocks as Rita, Billie Whitelaw as Marge and Joan Plowright as Nellie. The screenwriter was John McGrath and Billie Whitelaw won the 1988 Evening Standard British Film Award for best actress for her role.
