= Luke Kennard (poet) =

British poet, critic, novelist and lecturer

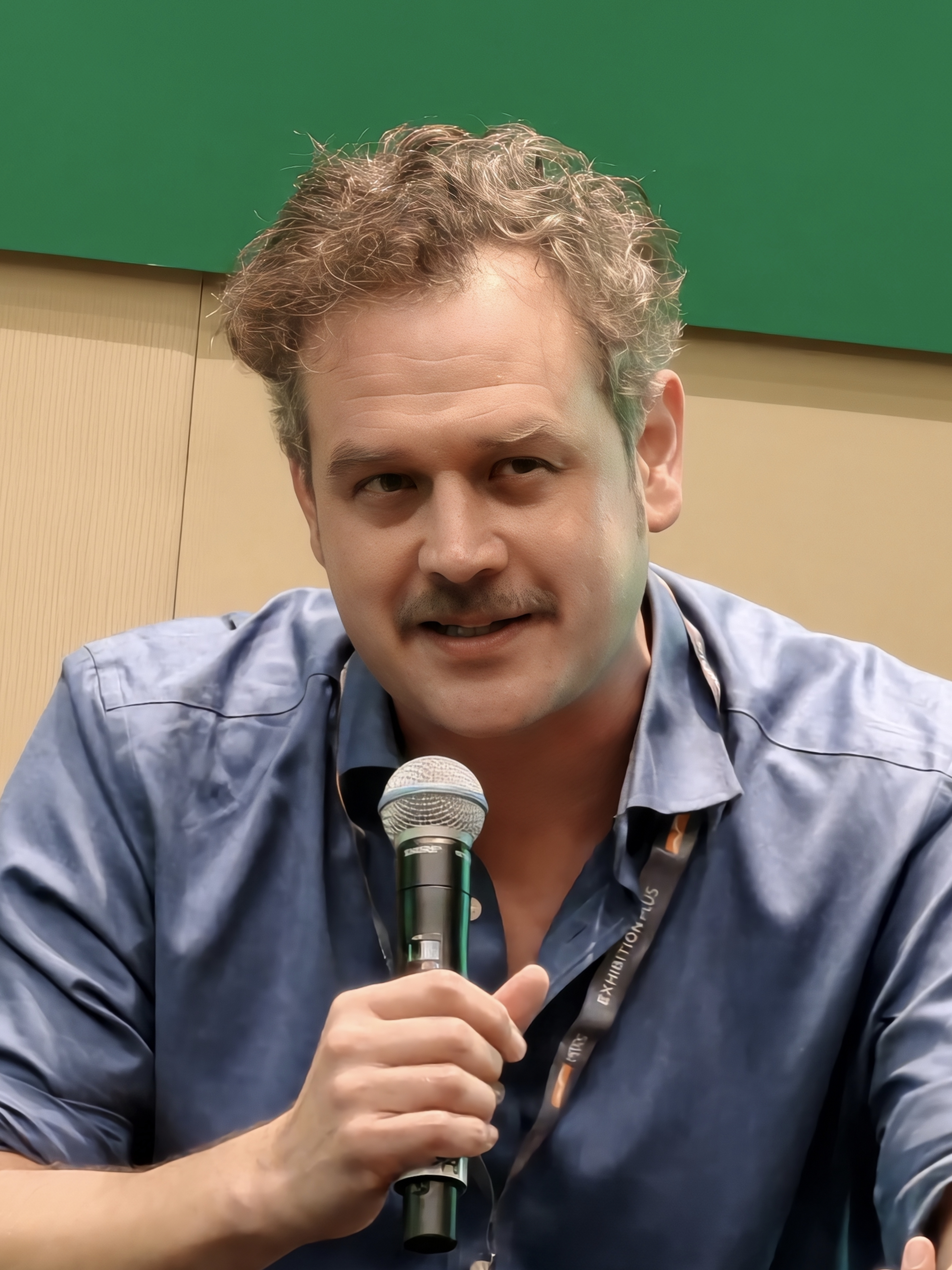
- Kennard at 2026 Hong Kong Book Fair
- Born: 1981 (age 44–45); Kingston-upon-Thames, England
- Education: University of Exeter (BA Hons; MA; PhD)
- Occupations: Poet, critic, novelist and lecturer
- Organizations: University of Birmingham
- Writing career
- Notable works: The Solex Brothers (2005); The Harbour Beyond The Movie (2007); The Transition (2017); Notes on the Sonnets (2021); Black Bag (2026)
- Notable awards: Eric Gregory Award; Forward Prize for Poetry

Luke Kennard (born 1981) is a British poet, critic, novelist and lecturer.

== Early life and education ==
Born in Kingston-upon-Thames, Kennard grew up in Luton. He studied English and Creative Writing at the University of Exeter, where he earned a BA (Hons), MA, and PhD.

== Career ==
Kennard won an Eric Gregory Award in 2005 for his first collection The Solex Brothers. His second collection, The Harbour Beyond The Movie, was shortlisted for the 2007 Forward Prize for Best Collection, making him the youngest ever poet to be nominated. In 2014, he was named as one of the Poetry Book Society's Next Generation Poets.

His debut novel, The Transition, was published by Fourth Estate in March 2017. The novel was a BBC Radio 4 Book at Bedtime.

His poetry collection Notes on the Sonnets won the 2021 Forward Prize for Best Collection.

His novel Black Bag was shortlisted for The Booker Prize in September 2026.

He lectures in Creative Writing at the University of Birmingham.

== Publications ==
=== Poetry collections ===
- The Solex Brothers (2005)
- The Harbour Beyond The Movie (2007)
- The Migraine Hotel (2009)
- Planet Shaped Horse (2011)
- The Necropolis Boat (2012)
- A Lost Expression (2012)
- Cain (2016)
- Truffle Hound (2018)
- Notes on the Sonnets (2021)
- Bad Sermons (2021)
- The Book of Jonah (2025)

=== Novels ===
- The Transition (2017)
- The Answer to Everything (2021)
- Black Bag (2026)

=== Other fiction ===
- Holophin (2012)
