= Beryl Bainbridge =

English writer (1932–2010)

Dame Beryl Bainbridge DBE
- Born: 21 November 1932; Liverpool, England
- Died: 2 July 2010 (aged 77); London, England
- Occupation: Novelist
- Spouse: Austin Davies (m. 1954; div. 1959)
- Partner: Alan Sharp
- Children: 3, including Rudi Davies
- Writing career
- Notable works: The Dressmaker (1973); The Bottle Factory Outing (1974); An Awfully Big Adventure (1989); Every Man for Himself (1996); Master Georgie (1998)

Dame Beryl Margaret Bainbridge (21 November 1932 – 2 July 2010) was an English writer. She was primarily known for her works of psychological fiction, often macabre tales set among the English working class. She won the Whitbread Awards prize for best novel in 1977 and 1996, and was nominated six times for the Booker Prize. She was described in 2007 as a national treasure. In 2008, The Times named Bainbridge on their list of the "50 greatest British writers since 1945".

== Biography ==
=== Early life ===
Beryl Margaret Bainbridge was born in Liverpool's Allerton suburb on 21 November 1932, the daughter of Winifred Baines and Richard Bainbridge. She grew up in the nearby town of Formby. Although she often gave her date of birth as 21 November 1934, she was born in 1932 and her birth was registered in the first quarter of 1933. When German former prisoner of war Harry Arno Franz wrote to her in November 1947, he mentioned her 15th birthday.

Bainbridge enjoyed writing, and by the age of 10 she was keeping a diary. She had elocution lessons and, when she was 11, appeared on the Northern Children's Hour radio show, alongside Billie Whitelaw and Judith Chalmers. She was expelled from Merchant Taylors' Girls' School in Great Crosby when she was caught with a "dirty rhyme" (as she later described it) written by someone else in her gymslip pocket. She then went on to study at Cone-Ripman School in Tring (now the Tring Park School for the Performing Arts), where she found she was good at history, English, and art. The summer she left school, she fell in love with former German prisoner of war Harry Arno Franz who was waiting to be repatriated. For the next six years, the couple corresponded and tried to get permission for him to return to Britain so that they could marry, but permission was denied and the relationship ended in 1953.

=== Subsequent years ===
In the following year (1954), Bainbridge married artist Austin Davies. In 1958, she attempted suicide by putting her head in a gas oven. The two divorced soon after, leaving Bainbridge a single mother of two children. Bainbridge spent her early years working as an actress, and she appeared in one 1961 episode of the soap opera Coronation Street playing an anti-nuclear protester. She later had a third child by Alan Sharp, the actress Rudi Davies (born 1965). Sharp, a Scotsman, was at the start of his career as novelist and screenwriter; Bainbridge would later let it be thought that he was her second husband; in truth, they never married but the relationship encouraged her on her way to fiction.

To help fill her time, Bainbridge began to write, primarily based on incidents from her childhood. Her first novel, Harriet Said..., was rejected by several publishers, one of whom found the central characters "repulsive almost beyond belief". It was eventually published in 1972, four years after her third novel (Another Part of the Wood). Her second and third novels were published (1967/68) and were received well by critics although they failed to earn much money. She wrote and published seven more novels during the 1970s, of which the fifth, Injury Time, was awarded the Whitbread prize for best novel in 1977.

In the late 1970s, she wrote a screenplay based on her novel Sweet William. The resulting film, starring Sam Waterston, was released in 1980.

From 1980 onwards, eight more novels appeared. The 1989 novel, An Awfully Big Adventure, was adapted into a film in 1995, starring Alan Rickman and Hugh Grant.

In the 1990s, Bainbridge turned to historical fiction. These novels continued to be popular with critics, but this time, were also commercially successful. Among her historical fiction novels are Every Man for Himself, about the 1912 Titanic disaster, for which Bainbridge won the 1996 Whitbread Awards prize for best novel, and Master Georgie, set during the Crimean War, for which she won the 1998 James Tait Black Memorial Prize for fiction. Her final novel, According to Queeney, is a fictionalized account of the last years of the life of Samuel Johnson as seen through the eyes of Queeney Thrale, eldest daughter of Henry and Hester Thrale. The Observer referred to it as a "...highly intelligent, sophisticated and entertaining novel".

From the 1990s, Bainbridge also served as a theatre critic for the monthly magazine The Oldie. Her reviews rarely contained negative content, and were usually published after the play had closed. A collection of reviews 1992-2002 were published in the book "Front Row: Evenings at the Theatre". The introduction described her theatrical experience, from winning a talent competition to assistant stage manager in Liverpool to occasional acting roles.

=== Final years ===
In 2003, Bainbridge's grandson Charlie Russell began filming a documentary, Beryl's Last Year, about her life. The documentary detailed her upbringing and her attempts to write a novel, Dear Brutus (which later became The Girl in the Polka Dot Dress). It was broadcast in the United Kingdom on 2 June 2007 on BBC Four.

In 2009, Bainbridge donated the short story "Goodnight Children, Everywhere" to Oxfam's Ox-Tales project, four collections of UK stories written by 38 authors. Her story was published in the "Air" collection. Bainbridge was the patron of the People's Book Prize.

Bainbridge was still working on The Girl in the Polka Dot Dress at the time of her death. The novel, which was based on a real-life journey Bainbridge made across America in 1968, is about the mystery girl reputed to have been involved in the assassination of Robert F. Kennedy. The novel, which was published in May 2011 by Little, Brown, was edited for publication by Brendan King, whose biography Beryl Bainbridge: Love by All Sorts of Means was published in September 2016.

== Death ==
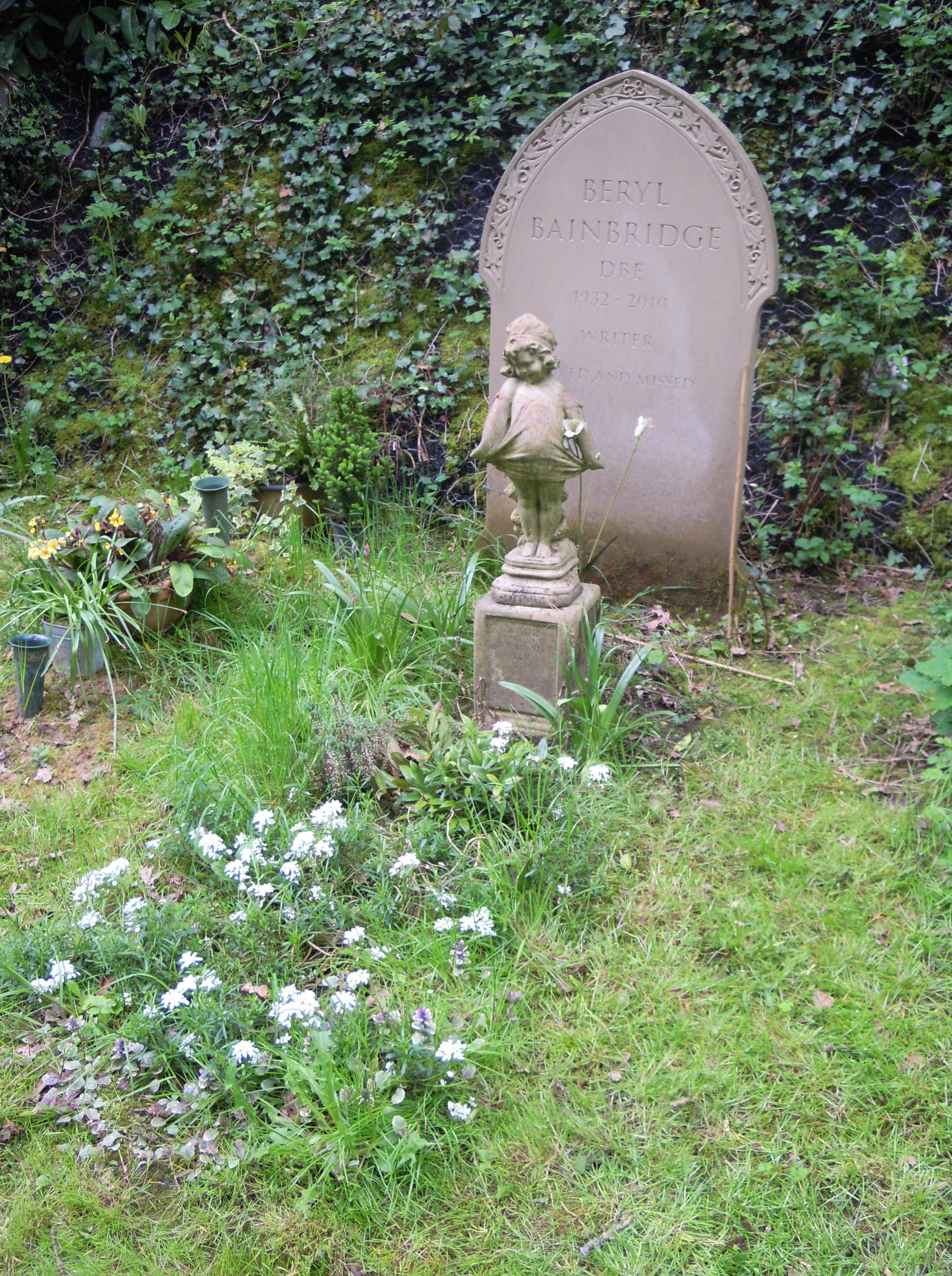
Bainbridge's grave in Highgate Cemetery

Bainbridge had been a heavy smoker for much of her life. Her cancer returned and she died on 2 July 2010, aged 77, in a London hospital. Confusion over her birth year resulted in some reports giving her age at death as 75. She is buried in Highgate Cemetery.

== Honours and awards ==
In 2000, Bainbridge was appointed Dame Commander of the Order of the British Empire (DBE). In June 2001, she was awarded an honorary degree by the Open University as Doctor of the University. In 2003, she was awarded the David Cohen Prize for Literature together with Thom Gunn. In 2005, the British Library acquired many of Bainbridge's private letters and diaries.

Following Bainbridge's death in 2010, the Man Booker Prize set up a "Best of Beryl" prize, the nominees being her books that had previously been shortlisted: The Dressmaker, The Bottle Factory Outing, An Awfully Big Adventure, Every Man for Himself, and Master Georgie; by a public vote, Master Georgie was chosen as the winner. In 2011, Bainbridge was posthumously awarded a special honour by the Booker Prize committee.

Mark Knopfler included a song titled "Beryl" dedicated to her and her posthumous award on his 2015 album Tracker. In 2016, a Blue Plaque was unveiled at the house she resided in while growing up in Formby.

== Bibliography ==
=== Novels ===
- A Weekend with Claude (1967)
- Another Part of the Wood (1968)
- Harriet Said... (1972)
- The Dressmaker (US title The Secret Glass) (1973) – shortlisted for Booker Prize
- The Bottle Factory Outing (1974) – shortlisted for Booker Prize, won the Guardian Fiction Prize
- Sweet William (1975)
- A Quiet Life (1976)
- Injury Time (1977) - winner, Whitbread Prize
- Young Adolf (1978)
- Another Part of the Wood (revised edn) (1979)
- Winter Garden (1980)
- A Weekend with Claude (revised edn) (1981)
- Watson's Apology (1984)
- Filthy Lucre (written as a teenager in 1946 but published 1986)
- An Awfully Big Adventure (1989) – shortlisted for Booker Prize
- The Birthday Boys (1991)
- Every Man for Himself (1996) – shortlisted for Booker Prize, winner of the Whitbread Prize
- Master Georgie (1998) – shortlisted for Booker Prize
- According to Queeney (2001)
- The Girl in the Polka Dot Dress (2011)

=== Short story collections ===
- Mum and Mr. Armitage (1985)
- Collected Stories (1994)
- Northern Stories Vol. 5 (co-editor with David Pownall) ISBN 978-0-946407-97-2 (1994)

=== Non-fiction ===
- English Journey, or The Road to Milton Keynes (1984)
- Forever England: North and South (1987)
- Something Happened Yesterday (1993)
- Front Row: Evenings at the Theatre (2005)
