= Black Bag (novel) =

2026 novel by Luke Kennard

- Author: Luke Kennard
- Set in: London
- Publisher: John Murray
- Publication place: London
- English publication date: 12 March 2026
- ISBN: 9781399826112
- Website: John Murray

Black Bag is a 2026 satirical novel by British poet and novelist Luke Kennard, published in the UK by John Murray. It was shortlisted for the 2026 Booker Prize.

== Plot ==
A down-on-his-luck actor agrees to take on the title role: a recreation of a 1967 experiment into the mere-exposure effect requiring him to attend university classes for a whole term dressed solely in a black leather bag. The experiment will "test life itself", claims the researcher who hires him. As time goes by, the (unnamed) narrator grows fond of his new identity and continues in the role even when outside the lecture theatre.

== Reception ==
Guardian reviewer Christopher Shrimpton described it as "tremendous good fun, with razor-sharp jokes and absurd scenarios", while saying that it also addressed deeper themes of meaning and connection. Chris Rutledge in the Washington Independent Review of Books noted that the novel's satire takes aim at several targets: the prevailing paradigms in academia, consumerism and conformity, cryptocurrencies, and the challenges faced by modern masculinity.

Black Bag was one of 13 books nominated for the 2026 Booker Prize. The panel of judges said they admired its sharply crafted sentences and humour and called it an "of-the-moment satire".
