= Duckworth Books =

British publisher

- Parent company: Duckworth Books Group
- Founded: 1898; 128 years ago
- Founder: Gerald Duckworth
- Country of origin: UK
- Headquarters location: London
- Distribution: Bloomsbury Publishing
- Publication types: Books
- Official website: www.duckworthbooks.co.uk

Duckworth Books, originally Gerald Duckworth and Company, is a British publisher founded in 1898 by Gerald Duckworth.

== History ==
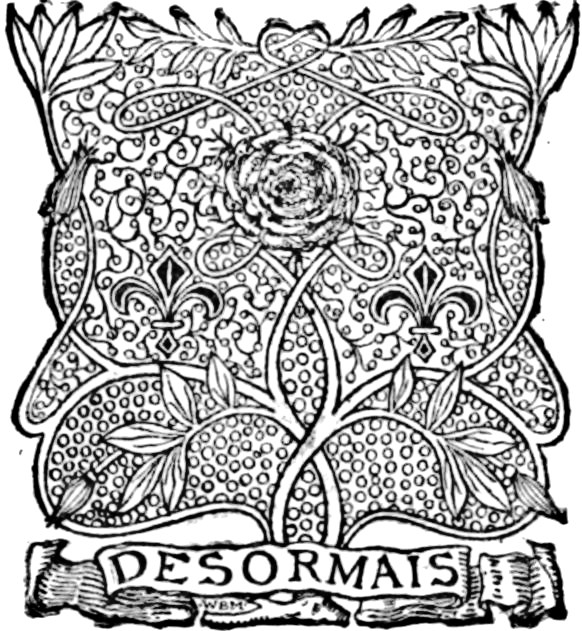
Duckworth printers mark c. 1898

Gerald Duckworth founded the company in 1898, setting up its office at 3 Henrietta Street, Covent Garden. Staff included Edward Garnett as literary advisor and (Herbert) Jonathan Cape as the sales manager.

Until the mid-1920s, the company's notable authors included Hilaire Belloc, Anton Chekhov, W. H. Davies, Elinor Glyn, W. H. Hudson, Henry James, D. H. Lawrence, W. Heath Robinson and Virginia Woolf (the founder's half-sister). Authors in the next two decades included John Galsworthy, Anthony Powell and Edith Sitwell.

Following Gerald Duckworth's death in 1937, control of the company passed to Mervyn Horder and Patrick Crichton-Smith. The company, heavily in debt after the Great Depression, suffered the loss of "its entire stock of unbound sheets" as the result of bomb damage during the Second World War. From 1945 until the 1970s the firm published authors such Simone de Beauvoir, Charlotte Mew and Evelyn Waugh.

In 1968, Gerard Duckworth & Co. was purchased by Colin Haycraft and a friend Tim Simon. Haycraft would run the company until his death in 1994. In this period Haycraft was described as a "one man university press" publishing at Duckworth a "body of works on Greek and Roman literature, philosophy and society" whose scholarship and originality "equalled the output of the large university houses". Meanwhile his wife, the writer Alice Thomas Ellis, was Duckworth's fiction editor and was responsible for publishing "Duckworth's best-selling author", Beryl Bainbridge.

The company moved from Henrietta Street to The Old Piano Factory in Camden, North London, on Old Gloucester Street, made famous by Alan Bennett in his bestselling book, The Lady in the Van.

In the period from the 1970s to the 1990s authors published by the company including John Bayley, Beryl Bainbridge, Jeffrey Bernard, Alice Thomas Ellis, Penelope Fitzgerald, Ogden Nash, Dorothy Parker and Oliver Sacks.

In 1998 the company celebrated its centenary and moved its premises to Frith Street, Soho.

In 2003, the company suffered a financial collapse and was put into receivership. Its assets were bought by Peter Mayer, a former chief executive of Penguin Books, who already owned The Overlook Press of New York City. Under new leadership, the company published authors such as Max Brooks, Julia Child, J. J. Connolly, Suzanne Fagence Cooper and Ray Kurzweil. In 2007 it was reported that Duckworth's trade books were then to be published "under the Duckworth Overlook" imprint while academic books would continue to "carry just the Duckworth name".

In 2010, Duckworth's academic list was acquired by Bloomsbury Publishing.

After Mayer's death in 2018, Duckworth was sold to Prelude Books and is now operated under the leadership of Pete Duncan and Matt Casbourne. Prelude Books rebranded itself under the name Duckworth Books and as of 2020 the company has been operating from an office in Richmond-upon-Thames with a focus on publishing non-fiction and historical fiction. As part of the rebranding, Duckworth was merged with Farrago Books, becoming one of Duckworth's imprints.

== Book series ==
- Covent Garden Library
- Crown Library
- Great Lives
- Greenback Library
- Hundred Years Series
- The Library of Art
- Masters of Painting
- Modern Plays
- New Reader’s Library
- Noted Irish Lives
- The Popular Library of Art
- Reader’s Library
- The Roadmender Series
- The Student Series
- Studies in Theology
- Two Shillings Net Series
