= 2010 in Norway =

- Centuries: 19th; 20th; 21st
- Decades: 1990s; 2000s; 2010s; 2020s
- See also: List of years in Norway

Events in the year 2010 in Norway.

== Incumbents ==
- Monarch – Harald V.
- Prime Minister – Jens Stoltenberg (Norwegian Labour Party)

== Events ==
=== January ===
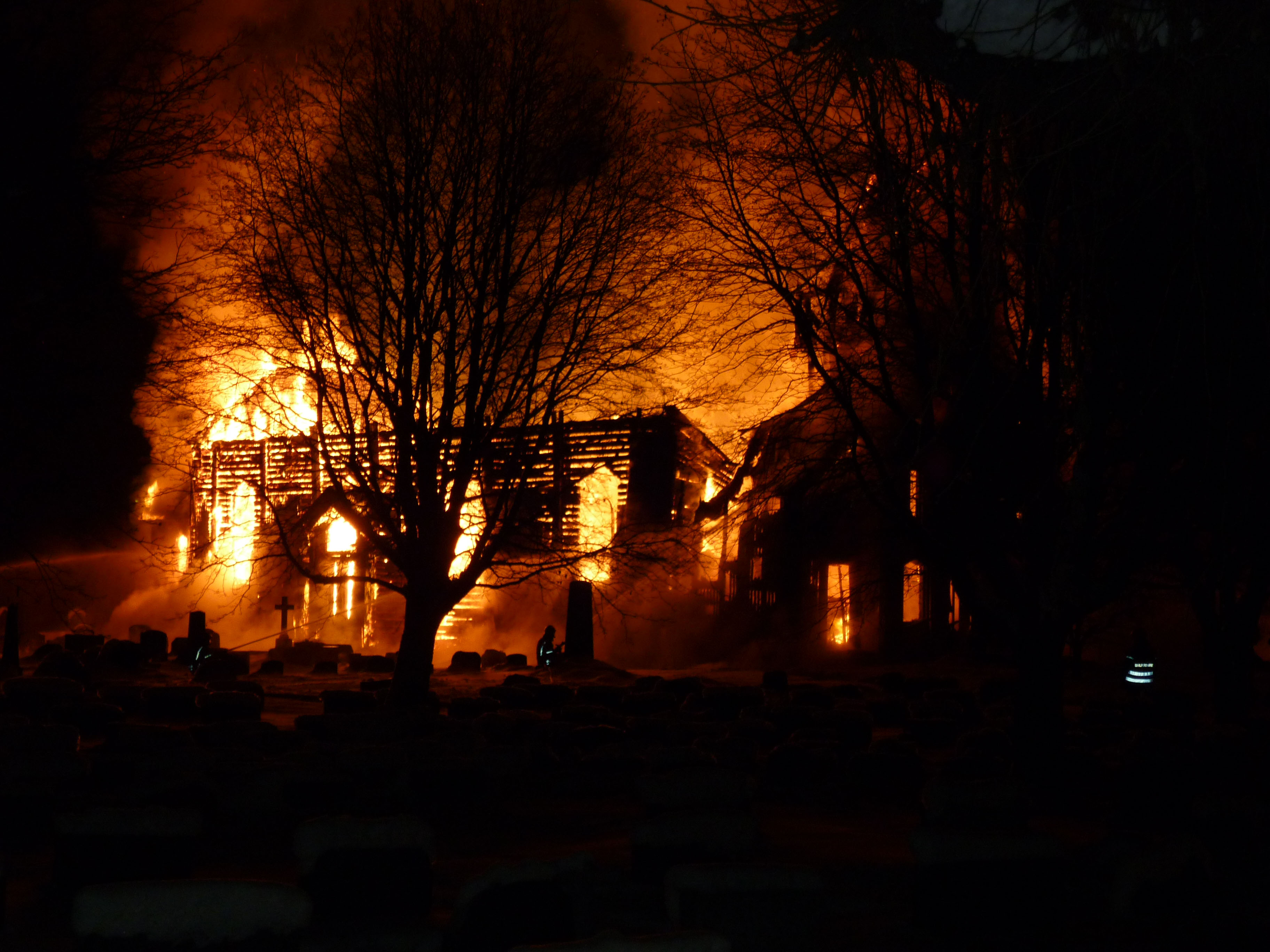
The Hønefoss church burned down to the ground on 26 January 2010.

- 1 January – The new immigration law comes into effect in Norway.
- 16 January – Norway tops the UN human development index.
- 26 January – Hønefoss church in Ringerike municipality, which was built in 1862, was burned down to the ground.

=== February ===
- 24–27 February – The 2010 Women's Bandy World Championship was held in Drammen.

=== March ===
- 24 March – Sjursøya train crash: An out-of-control train derailment at Sjursøya in Oslo killed three people and seriously injured several others.

=== April ===
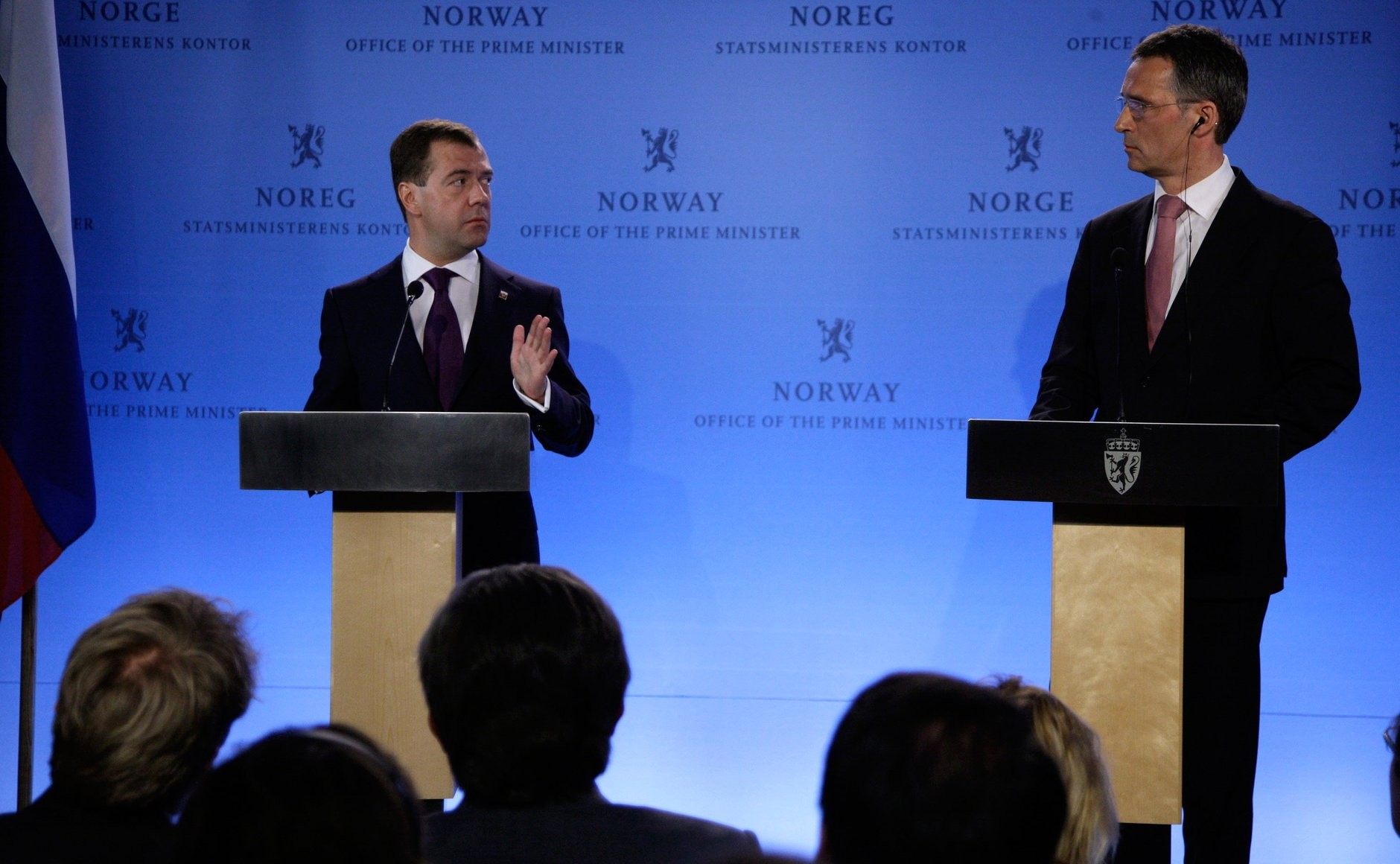
Norwegian Prime Minister Jens Stoltenberg (left) and Russian President Dmitry Medvedev (left) announce that Norway and Russia have settled the long conflict over their maritime border in the Barents Sea, on 27 April 2010.

- 7 April – Norway experiences its first Catholic child abuse scandal as it becomes known that a bishop, Georg Müller, was forced to resign in 2009 because of sexual abuse of an altar boy in the early 1990s.
- 14 April – An ash cloud from the second eruption of Eyjafjallajökull causes the air space over Northern Norway to close down in the evening, then on the 15th all air traffic over Norway is halted, including air ambulances and rescue helicopters.
- 24 April – Norway and Russia settle a 40-year-old conflict over their maritime border in the Barents Sea, announced during President Medvedev's state visit in Norway.
- 26 April – The first half (eastbound) of the new Bjørvika Tunnel opens.

=== June ===
- 10 June – Two Norwegians, including one with British citizenship are sentenced to death by a military court in the Democratic Republic of the Congo on charges of murder and espionage.
- 22 June – The Bergen Light Rail opens.

=== July ===
- 8 July – Three people with a Norwegian residence permit are arrested in Norway on suspicion of having links to Al Qaeda and for planning to detonate bombs in New York and London.
- 12 July – The Norwegian satellite AISSat-1 is launched.
- 24 July – Four Ukrainian tourists die in a rafting accident in the Sjoa river.

=== August ===
- 20 August – Norwegian stand-up comedian Hans Morten Hansen completes a 38-hour-14-minute-long stand-up marathon, setting a new world record for longest stand-up performance.

=== September ===
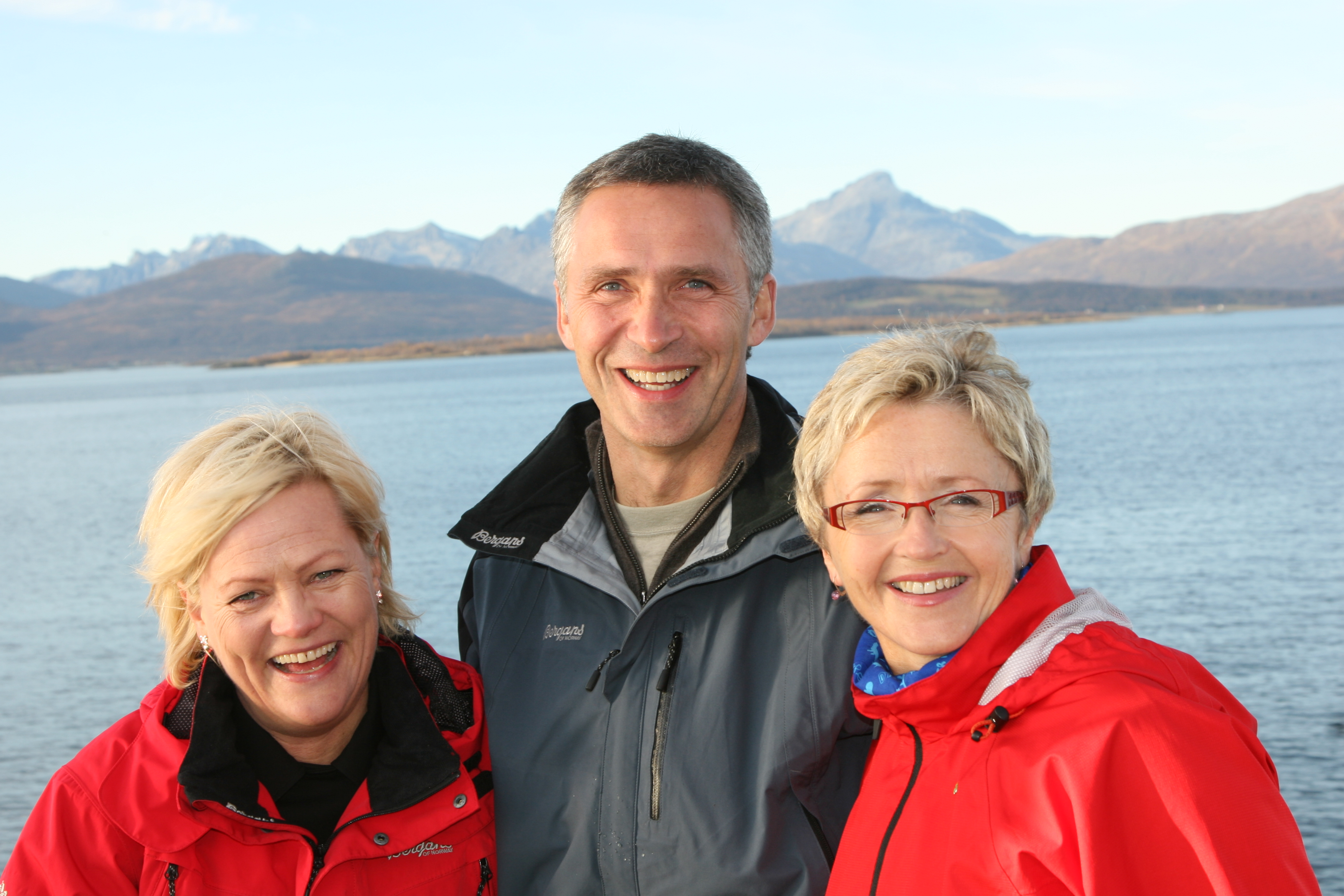
Kristin Halvorsen (left), Jens Stoltenberg (center) and Liv Signe Navarsete (right) in Tromsø, Norway, on 29 September 2010 during a summer day.

- 20 September – The second half (westbound) of the new Bjørvika Tunnel opens
- 21 September – The Russian martial artist and racist political activist Viacheslav Datsik turns himself in to Norwegian immigration authorities requesting political asylum after escaping a Russian mental institution and rowing across the Baltic Sea.

=== November ===
- 5 November – The Government of Norway demands an explanation from the US Government on reports that the US embassy in Oslo conducted illegal surveillance on Norwegian citizens for more than ten years.

=== December ===
- 10 December – A ceremony is held in Norway to award the Nobel Peace Prize to Chinese dissident Liu Xiaobo in absentia.

== Popular culture ==
=== Music ===
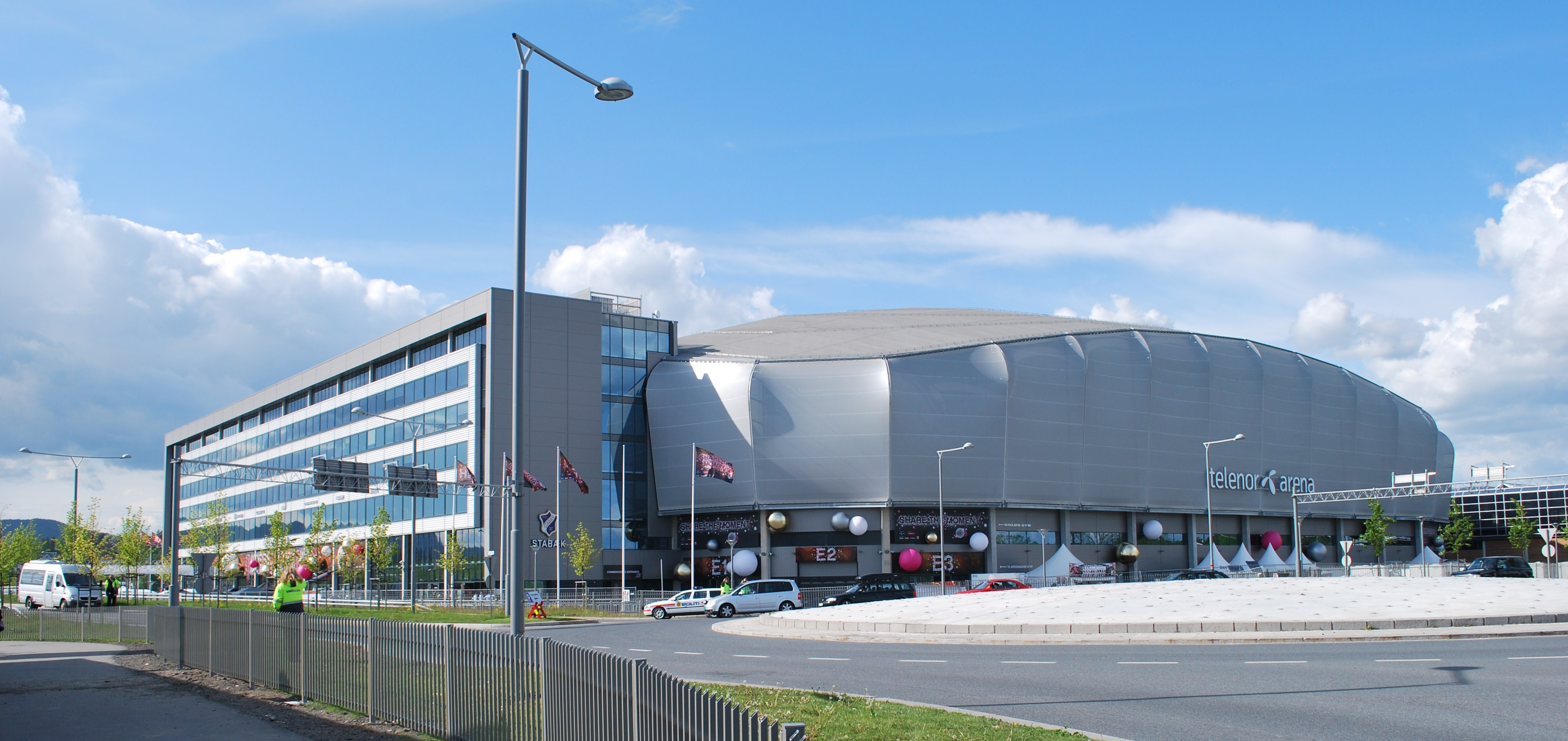
The Telenor Arena in Bærum where the Eurovision Song Contest 2010 was held at

- 29 May – Eurovision Song Contest 2010 was held at Telenor Arena, Bærum. The two semi finals took place on 25 and 27 May. The 2010 winner was Germany.

=== Sports ===
- – 19 January-year-old chess grandmaster Magnus Carlsen is confirmed as the youngest-ever world number one in the official January 2010 FIDE rating list.
- 15 February – Norway delivers its poorest ever olympic performance in the men's 15 km freestyle cross-country competition.
- 30 June – The Oslo football club FK Lyn which was established in 1896 files for bankruptcy.
- 31 July – Norway win the 2010 Women's Junior World Handball Championship.

=== Literature ===
- Karl Ove Knausgård – My Struggle (Min Kamp), vols 4-5
- Sjelens Amerika, October, 2013, ISBN 9788249511488
- Adelheid Seyfarth – 40 kalde bak månen

== Anniversaries ==
- 5 February – 200 years since the birth of Ole Bull (d. 1880)
- 14 February – 100 years since the birth of Leif Juster (d. 1995)
- 26 April – 100 years since the death of Bjørnstjerne Bjørnson (b. 1832)
- 14 May – 150 years since the establishment of Aftenposten (founded 1860)
- 15 December – 200 years since the birth of Peter Andreas Munch (d. 1863)

== Notable deaths ==
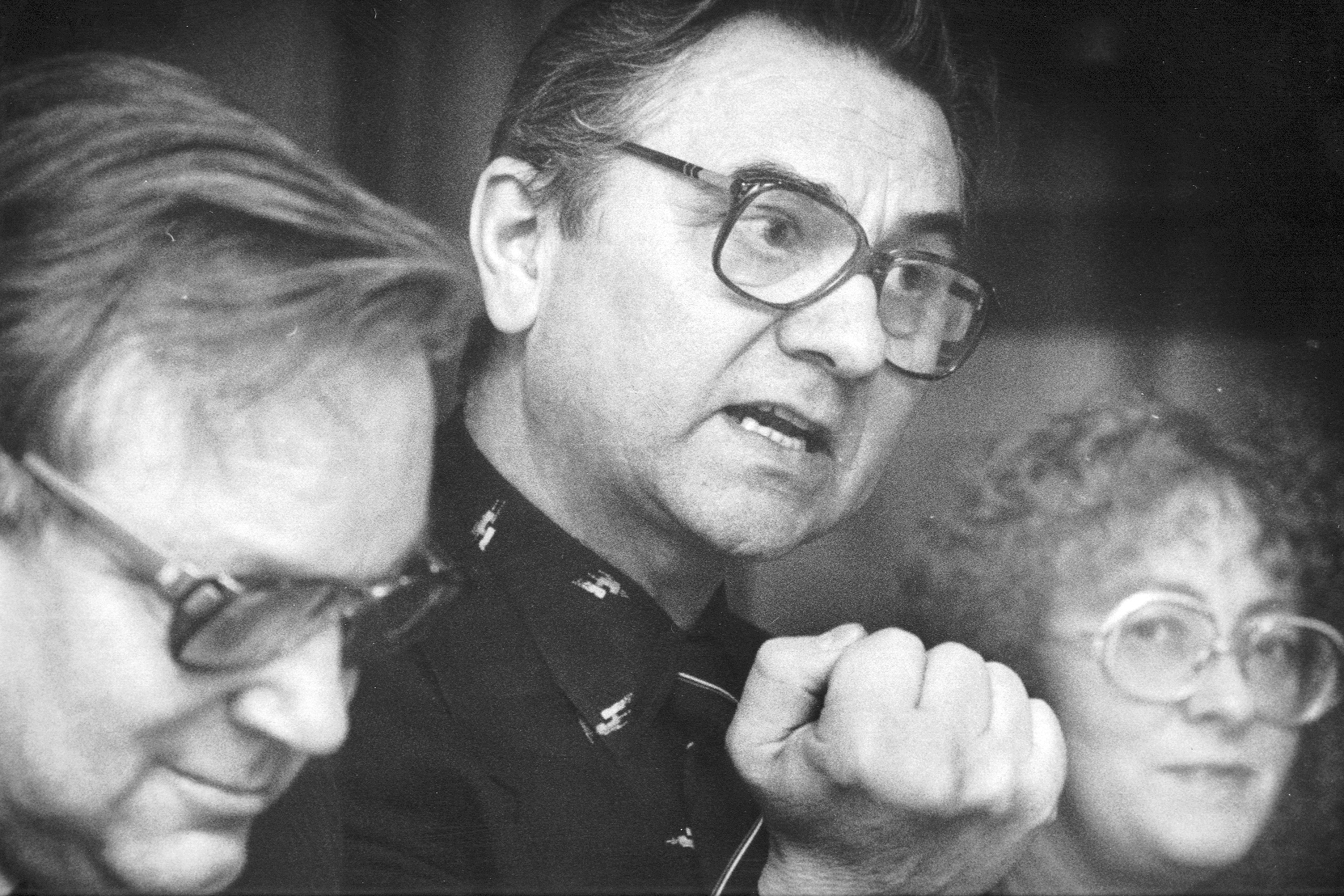
Asbjørn Sjøthun in the middle

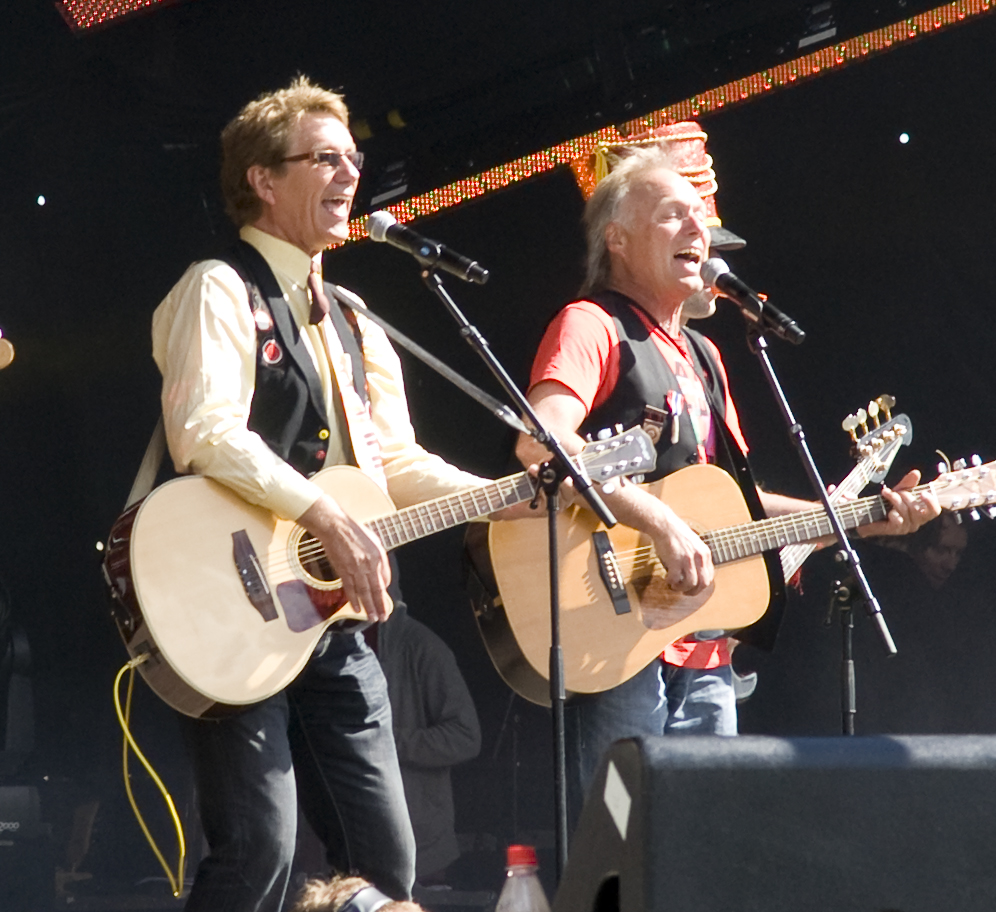
Knutsen & Ludvigsen attending at stage on Rådhusplassen in Oslo. Gustav Lorentzen on the left

=== January ===
- 3 January – Isak Rogde, translator (b. 1947)
- 4 January – Olaug Abrahamsen, politician (b. 1928)
- 9 January – Per N. Hagen, politician (b. 1936)
- 10 January – Torbjørn Yggeseth, ski jumper (b. 1934)
- 15 January – Rolf Normann Torgersen, civil servant (b. 1918)
- 17 January – Paul Vårdal, auditor (b. 1915)
- 18 January – Edel Viola Ski, politician (b. 1918)
- 20 January – Rolf Nyboe Nettum, literary historian (b. 1919)
- 23 January – Ellen Marie Forland, shipowner (b. 1926)
- 25 January – Magne S. Espedal, mathematician (b. 1942, died in Germany)
- 25 January – Hallgrim Kløve, psychologist (b. 1927)
- 26 January – Dag Frøland, comedian and revue artist (b. 1945)
- 30 January – Sølve Grotmol, sports commentator (b. 1939)
- 31 January – Gunnar Aksnes, chemist (b. 1926)
- 31 January – Thorleif Karlsen, police inspector (b. 1909)

=== February ===
- 1 February – Egil Willumsen, physician and civil servant (b. 1925)
- 2 February – Jens-Anton Poulsson, resistance member (b. 1918)
- 7 February – Lars Aspeflaten, barrister and politician (b. 1924)
- 10 February – Kjell Solem, musician (b. 1950)
- 11 February – Mona Hofland, actress (b. 1929)
- 12 February – Alexis Pappas, chemist (b. 1915)
- 14 February – Helge Høva, politician (b. 1928)
- 16 February – Olav Sandvik, veterinarian (b. 1925)
- 17 February – Bjørn Benkow, fraudster (b. 1940)
- 19 February – Arne Knudsen, gymnast (b. 1923)
- 23 February – Ole Rasmus Møgster, businessperson (b. 1958)
- 23 February – Kristin Kverneland Lønningdal, politician (b. 1923)
- 24 February – Dagfin Huseby, wrestler (b. 1922)
- 25 February – Egil Kjølner, politician (b. 1920)
- 25 February – Magnus Midtbø, trade unionist (b. 1942)
- 28 February – Harald Nikolai Brøvig, politician (b. 1917)

=== March ===
- 4 March – Amalie Christie, pianist (b. 1913)
- 8 March – Tor Tank-Nielsen, businessperson (b. 1918)
- 10 March – Per Dalin, educationalist (b. 1936)
- 12 March – Wenche Krossøy, writer (b. 1943)
- 15 March – Erling Danielsen, politician (b. 1922)
- 15 March – Knut Bergersen, architect (b. 1915)
- 18 March – Erik Lorentzen, ship-owner (b. 1930)
- 21 March – Liv Nysted, author (b. 1949)
- 24 March – Anna Louise Beer, judge (b. 1924)
- 25 March – Pål Bang-Hansen, film director, actor and critic (b. 1937).
- 26 March – Morgan Kornmo, Pentecostal leader (b. 1925)
- 28 March – Johan Jørgen Ugland, businessman (b. 1921)
- 28 March – Asbjørn Sjøthun, politician (b. 1927)
- 31 March – Knut Bjøro, professor of medicine (b. 1925)
- 31 March – Thomas Hysing, engineer (b. 1917)

=== April ===
- 1 April – Berge Sæberg, politician (b. 1923)
- 2 April – Rune Refling, DJ (b. 1965)
- 4 April – Hans Bovim, Christian educator (b. 1915)
- 14 April – Lars Jacob Krogh, journalist (b. 1938)
- 15 April – Anne Lise Eriksen, speed skater (b. 1926)
- 21 April – Gustav Lorentzen, musician (b. 1947)
- 21 April – Alv Kragerud, priest and theologian (b. 1932)
- 22 April – Stig Johansson, linguist (b. 1939)
- 23 April – Hans Økland, geophysicist (b. 1918)
- 24 April – Per Bang, journalist (b. 1922)
- 29 April – Anna Elisabeth Ljunggren, physiotherapist (b. 1943)

=== May ===
- 4 May – Aage William Søgaard, politician (b. 1933)
- 7 May – Anders Buraas, journalist (b. 1915, died in Switzerland)
- 8 May – Bjarne Berg, editor and sports investor (b. 1950)
- 10 May – Margit Hvammen, alpine skier (b. 1932)
- 13 May – Adelsten Sivertsen, businessperson (b. 1925)
- 14 May – Kjell Fjørtoft, writer and filmmaker (b. 1930)
- 20 May – Erling Hall-Hofsø, editor and politician (b. 1917)
- 21 May – Eindride Sommerseth, politician (b. 1918)
- 23 May – Erik Brand Olimb, engineer and editor (b. 1930)
- 25 May – Torstein Hjellum, political scientist (b. 1940)
- 26 May – Odd Bye, politician (b. 1916)
- 30 May – Kristian Bergheim, jazz saxophonist (b. 1926)

=== June ===
- 1 June – Omar Andréen, illustrator (b. 1922)
- 2 June – Ole Jacob Bangstad, military officer and sports official (b. 1917)
- 5 June – Arne Nordheim, composer (b. 1931)
- 5 June – Ingeborg Johanna Mestad, supercentenarian (b. 1899)
- 8 June – Alf Bøe, art historian (b. 1927)
- 9 June – Gudrun Omdahl Onshuus, supercentenarian (b. 1899)
- 14 June – Richard Herrmann, journalist, writer and radio personality (b. 1919)
- 16 June – Peter Lødrup, jurist (b. 1932)
- 16 June – Bjørg Aase Sørensen, sociologist (b. 1944)
- 24 June – Egil Johan Ree, journalist and radio personality (b. 1936)
- 27 June – Trond André Bolle, military officer (b. 1968, died in Afghanistan)
- 28 June – Kjartan Ottosson, linguist and philologist (b. 1956, died in Iceland)
- 30 June – Per Johannes Kolsaker, chemist (b. 1931)
- 30 June – Anders Christian Gogstad, physician (b. 1923)

=== July ===
- 4 July – Alex Christiansen, architect (b. 1925)
- 6 July – Kristofer Leirdal, sculptor (b. 1915)
- 7 July – Arild Kristo, photographer (b. 1939)
- 8 July – Anders Bratholm, jurist (b. 1920)
- 8 July – Willy Railo, psychologist (b. 1941)
- 14 July – Arne Novang, cellist (b. 1920)
- 15 July – Knut Stensholm, drummer (b. 1954)
- 23 July – Willy Bakken, musician and popular culture writer (b. 1951)
- 24 July – Haakon Sandvold, businessman (b. 1921)

=== August ===
- 2 August – Ole Ivar Løvaas, psychologist (b. 1927)
- 6 August – Knut Østby, canoer (b. 1922)
- 14 August – Elin Unhjem, politician (b. 1925)
- 14 August – Terje Stigen, writer (b. 1922)
- 14 August – Jan Reinås, businessman (b. 1944)
- 17 August – Else Hagen, painter (b. 1914)
- 21 August – Jan T. Jørgensen, businessperson (b. 1948)
- 22 August – Haakon Andreas Olsen, physicist (b. 1923)
- 27 August – Sigurd Verdal, politician (b. 1927)
- 27 August – Tore Olsen, physicist (b. 1930)
- 31 August – Ba Dedekam, artist (b. 1914, died in Switzerland)

=== September ===
- 5 September – Ludvig Eikaas, artist (b. 1920)
- 6 September – Kalle Zwilgmeyer, musician (b. 1937, died in Denmark)
- 7 September – Anders Svela, footballer (b. 1939)
- 14 September – Alf Kjellman, jazz saxophonist (b. 1938)
- 18 September – Inge Steensland, resistance leader and ship-owner (b. 1923)
- 18 September – Øystein Gåre, football coach (b. 1954)
- 18 September – Ingjald Ørbeck Sørheim, lawyer and politician (b. 1937)
- 20 September – Tore Bernt Ramton, sports official (b. 1945)
- 22 September – Svein Ove Strømmen, businessperson (b. 1949)
- 23 September – Knut Dæhlin, civil servant (b. 1923)
- 25 September – Grete Prytz Kittelsen, artist (b. 1917)
- 29 September – Arne Wang, professor of informatics (b. 1947)
- 30 September – Tor Richter, sport shooter (b. 1938)

=== October ===
- 5 October – Jack Berntsen, folk singer (b. 1940)
- 5 October – Jan Martin Flod, judge (b. 1947)
- 7 October – Halvor Bjellaanes, banker and politician (b. 1925)
- 9 October – Mattis Mathiesen, film photographer (b. 1924)
- 12 October – Tikken Manus, resistance member (b. 1914)
- 12 October – Bjarne Lerum, businessperson (b. 1941)
- 17 October – Finn Hald, artist (b. 1929)
- 17 October – Åsmund Apeland, politician (b. 1930)
- 18 October – Roald Halvorsen, trade unionist and politician (b. 1914)
- 19 October – Bjørn Haga, news anchor (b. 1926)
- 21 October – Kjell Landmark, writer and politician (b. 1930)
- 22 October – Kjell Stormoen, actor and theatre director (b. 1921)
- 23 October – Albert W. Owesen, photographer (b. 1917)
- 25 October – Ada Polak, art historian (b. 1914, died in England)
- 26 October – Viggo Aaberg, biathlon coach (b. 1952)
- 28 October – Erling Fløtten, politician (b. 1937)
- 28 October – Leif Heimstad, war sailor (b. 1920)
- 29 October – John Moberg, writer (b. 1938)
- 31 October – Hans Høegh, organizational leader (b. 1926)
- 31 October – Tore Vigerust, genealogist (b. 1955)

=== November ===
- 2 November – Tonje Strøm, illustrator (b. 1937)
- 5 November – Andreas Gjermstad, actor, (b. 1932)
- 7 November – Per Saugstad, psychologist (b. 1920)
- 10 November – Einar Sæter, athlete, resistance member, editor and writer (b. 1917)
- 16 November – Ragnhild Magerøy, writer (b. 1920)
- 18 November – Gustav Adolf Hegh, actor (b. 1927)
- 19 November – Ole Bjørn Støle, Supreme Court Justice (b. 1950)
- 19 November – Eystein Eggen, writer (b. 1944)
- 21 November – Ottar Helge Johannessen, artist (b. 1929)
- 24 November – Ardis Kaspersen, food writer (b. 1920)
- 27 November – Egil Pettersen, philologist (b. 1922)
- 29 November – Jon Berle, dancer (b. 1932)

=== December ===
- 1 December – Sigurd Resell, sculptor (b. 1920)
- 3 December – Kåre Sandvand, illustrator (b. 1932)
- 4 December – Torodd Hauer, speed skater (b. 1922)
- 5 December – Per Olav Tiller, psychologist (b. 1926)
- 6 December – Ellen Ugland, businessperson (b. 1953)
- 6 December – Sivert Donali, sculptor (b. 1931)
- 8 December – Dag Alveberg, film producer (b. 1951)
- 13 December – Knut Ivar Skeid, journalist (b. 1957)
- 14 December – Håkon Christie, architect (b. 1922)
- 17 December – Arne Arnesen, diplomat (b. 1928)
- 19 December – Terje Hals, police chief (b. 1937)
- 23 December – Knut Aas, politician (b. 1918)
- 24 December – Per Magnus Karstensen, politician (b. 1915)
- 30 December – Hans Kristian Hogsnes, politician (b. 1954)
- 31 December – Lasse Trædal, missionary leader (b. 1923)

== See also ==
- 2009-2010 flu pandemic in Norway
- 2010 in Norwegian music
