= Terje (name) =

Unisex given name

Terje is a masculine given name of Scandinavian origin, a variant of Torgeir. In Estonia, it is a feminine given name. Notable people with the name include:

== Given name ==
=== A–H ===
- Terje Aa (born 1961), Norwegian bridge player
- Terje Aasland (born 1965), Norwegian politician
- Dag Terje Andersen (born 1957), Norwegian politician
- Terje Andersen (born 1952), Norwegian speed skater and president of the Norwegian Skating Association
- Terje Baalsrud (1914–2003), Norwegian newspaper editor
- Terje Bakken (1978–2004), Norwegian black metal vocalist
- Olav Terje Bergo (born 1946), Norwegian journalist
- Terje Bergstad (1938–2014), Norwegian painter and printmaker
- Terje Bjørklund (born 1945), Norwegian pianist and composer
- Terje Bratberg (born 1955), Norwegian historian and encyclopedist
- Terje Breivik (born 1965), Norwegian politician and entrepreneur
- Terje Brofos (aka Hariton Pushwagner; 1940–2018), Norwegian artist
- Terje Dahl (1935–2017), Norwegian jockey and horse trainer
- Terje Dragseth (born 1955), Norwegian poet, author and film director
- Terje Fjærn (1942–2016), Norwegian musician, orchestra leader and musical conductor
- Terje Formoe (born 1949), Norwegian singer, songwriter, actor, playwright and author
- Terje G. Simonsen (born 1963), Norwegian historian and nonfiction author
- Terje Gewelt (born 1960), Norwegian upright-bassist
- Terje Granerud (born 1951), Norwegian politician
- Terje Grøstad (1925–2011), Norwegian painter and illustrator
- Terje Gulbrandsen (1944–2015), Norwegian footballer
- Terje Moe Gustavsen (1954–2019), Norwegian politician
- Terje Håkonsen (born 1974), Norwegian snowboarder
- Terje Halleland (born 1966), Norwegian politician
- Terje Hals (1937–2010), Norwegian jurist and police chief
- Terje Hanssen (born 1948), Norwegian biathlete
- Terje Hartviksen (born 1950), Norwegian actor and theater director
- Terje Hauge (born 1965), Norwegian football referee
- Terje Haugland (born 1944), Norwegian long jumper
- Terje Høilund, Norwegian handball player
- Terje Holtet Larsen (born 1963), Norwegian journalist, novelist and writer
- Terje Høsøien (born 1974), Norwegian football player

=== I–O ===
- Terje Isungset (born 1964), Norwegian drummer and composer
- Terje Joelsen (born 1968), Norwegian footballer
- Terje Johansen (born 1941), Norwegian politician
- Terje Johanssen (1942–2005), Norwegian poet
- Rolf Terje Klungland (born 1963), Norwegian politician
- Terje Kojedal (born 1957), Norwegian footballer
- Terje Knudsen (1942–2017), Norwegian politician
- Terje Krokstad (born 1956), Norwegian biathlete
- Terje Langli (born 1965), Norwegian cross-country skier
- Terje Leonardsen (born 1976), Norwegian footballer
- Terje Liknes (born 1959), Norwegian football player and manager
- Terje Liverød (born 1955), Norwegian footballer and agent
- Leif Terje Løddesøl (1935–2021), Norwegian businessman
- Terje Lømo (born 1935), Norwegian physiologist
- Terje Luik (born 1941), Estonian actress
- Terje Mærli (born 1940), Norwegian playwright and theater director
- Terje Meyer (1942–2020), Norwegian industrial designer
- Terje Mikkelsen (born 1957), Norwegian conductor
- Terje Moe (1933–2009), Norwegian architect
- Terje Moe (1943–2004), Norwegian painter
- Terje Moland Pedersen (born 1952), Norwegian police officer and politician
- Terje Ness (born 1968), Norwegian chef
- Terje Nilsen (1951–2019), Norwegian singer and songwriter
- Terje Nordberg (born 1949), Norwegian comics artist, comics writer, magazine editor and painter
- Terje Nyberget (born 1953), Norwegian military officer and politician
- Terje Olsen (born 1950), Norwegian footballer
- Terje Olsen (born 1951), Norwegian politician
- Terje Olsen (Todd Terje; born 1961), Norwegian DJ
- Terje Olsen (born 1970), Norwegian footballer
- Terje Ottar (born 1945), Norwegian politician
- Jon Terje Øverland (born 1944), Norwegian alpine skier

=== P–Z ===
- Terje Pedersen (born 1943), Norwegian javelin thrower
- Terje Pennie (born 1960), Estonian actress
- Terje Riis-Johansen (born 1968), Norwegian politician
- Terje Rød-Larsen (born 1947), Norwegian diplomat, politician and sociologist
- Terje Rollem (1915–1993), Norwegian military officer and member of the Norwegian Resistance
- Terje Rypdal (born 1947), Norwegian guitarist and composer
- Terje Sagvolden (1945–2011), Norwegian behavioral neuroscientist
- Terje Sandkjær (born 1944), Norwegian politician
- Terje Vik Schei (aka Tchort; b. 1974), Norwegian black metal musician
- Terje Skarsfjord (1942–2018), Norwegian footballer and manager
- Terje Skjeldestad (born 1978), Norwegian footballer
- Terje Sølsnes (born 1945), Norwegian television presenter
- Terje Søviknes (born 1969), Norwegian politician
- Terje Steen (1944–2020), Norwegian ice hockey player
- Terje Stigen (1922–2010), Norwegian author
- Terje Svabø (born 1952), Norwegian journalist
- Terje Thoen (1944–2008), Norwegian ice hockey player
- Terje Thorslund (born 1945), Norwegian javelin thrower
- Terje Tønnesen (born 1955), Norwegian violinist
- Terje Totland (born 1957), Norwegian high jumper
- Terje Trei (born 1967), Estonian politician
- Terje Tvedt (born 1951), Norwegian academic, author and filmmaker
- Terje Tysland (born 1951), Norwegian singer, songwriter and musician
- Terje Vareberg (born 1948), Norwegian economist and business executive
- Terje Venaas (1947–2025), Norwegian jazz musician
- Terje Wesche (born 1947), Norwegian sprint canoer
- Terje Winterstø Røthing (born 1977), Norwegian guitarist
- Terje Wold (1899–1972), Norwegian judge and politician

== Fictional characters ==
- Terje Vigen, an 1862 poem written by Henrik Ibsen
- Terje Vigen, a 1917 Swedish film directed by Victor Sjöström, based on a poem of the same title
