= Terje =

Terje may refer to:

- Terje (name), a form of the Scandinavian name Torgeir
- Tria (Hungarian: Terje), a village in the commune of Derna, Bihor, Romania
