= Sivertsen =

Sivertsen is a surname. Notable people with the surname include:

- Adelsten Sivertsen (1925–2010), Norwegian businessperson
- Celine Sivertsen (born 1993), Norwegian handball player
- Cort Sivertsen (1622–1675), Norwegian seaman
- Eirik Sivertsen (born 1971), Norwegian politician
- Halvdan Sivertsen (born 1950), Norwegian singer-songwriter and guitarist
- Helge Sivertsen (1913–1986), Norwegian discus thrower and politician
- Jan Sivertsen (born 1951), Danish painter
- Kenneth Sivertsen (musician) (1961–2006), Norwegian musician, composer, poet, and comedian
- Kenneth Sivertsen (skier) (born 1973), Norwegian skier
- Kristoffer Sivertsen (born 1988), Norwegian politician
- Odin Sivertsen (1914–2008), Norwegian politician
- Oskar Sivertsen (born 2004), Norwegian footballer
- Rasmus A. Sivertsen (born 1972), Norwegian film director, editor, producer and animator
- Sigvard Sivertsen (1881–1963), Norwegian gymnast
- Solfrid Sivertsen (born 1947), Norwegian librarian
- Stian Sivertsen (born 1989), Norwegian snowboarder
- Sture Sivertsen (born 1966), Norwegian skier

== See also ==
- Sivert (disambiguation)
