= Norderhov Church =

Church in Buskerud, Norway

- Norderhov kirke
- View of the church
- Norderhov Church
- 60°07′53″N 10°16′12″E
- Location: Ringerike, Buskerud
- Country: Norway
- Denomination: Church of Norway
- Previous denomination: Catholic Church
- Churchmanship: Evangelical Lutheran

History
- Status: Parish church
- Founded: c. 1170
- Consecrated: c. 1170

Architecture
- Functional status: Active
- Architectural type: Cruciform
- Completed: c. 1170 (856 years ago)

Specifications
- Capacity: 400
- Materials: Stone

Administration
- Diocese: Tunsberg
- Deanery: Ringerike prosti
- Parish: Norderhov og Ask
- Norwegian Cultural Heritage Site
- Type: Church
- Status: Automatically protected
- ID: 85149

Norderhov Church (Norwegian: Norderhov kirke) is a parish church of the Church of Norway in Ringerike Municipality in Buskerud county, Norway. It is located in the village of Norderhov. It is one of the churches for the Norderhov og Ask parish which is part of the Ringerike prosti (deanery) in the Diocese of Tunsberg. The white, wooden church was built in a cruciform design around the year 1170. The church seats about 400 people.

== History ==
The earliest existing historical records of the church date back to the year 1297, but the church was not built that year. The church is commonly dated to around the year 1170. It was built as a long church of local stone (sandstone and limestone).

The church, like most other churches in Norway, was sold into private ownership during the Norwegian church sale in 1723 to help the King pay off war debts. The parish priest, Daniel Ramus, purchased the church (along with Haug Church, Lunder Church, and Viker Church). In 1739, the church was sold to the local residents of the parish.

In 1814, this church served as an election church (Norwegian: valgkirke). Together with more than 300 other parish churches across Norway, it was a polling station for elections to the 1814 Norwegian Constituent Assembly which wrote the Constitution of Norway. This was Norway's first national election. Each church parish was a constituency that elected people called "electors" who later met together in each county to elect the representatives for the assembly that was to meet at Eidsvoll Manor later that year.

The church was expanded in 1881–1882. The old chancel was torn down and the nave was expanded eastwards. New transepts were built to the north and south which converted the building into a cruciform church. The new parts including a new choir with apse were made of plastered brick. The original parts of the church remaining after the expansion include the tower and western part of the nave. The nave's west portal and south portal as well as the tower's west portal are believed to be original, while the windows have been altered.

The church was restored in 1954–1957 under the direction of Finn Bryn. In its current form, the church is a whitewashed cruciform church with a relatively high spire on the west tower. The tower structure also has four small side towers. Today's choir, like the previous one, ends with an apse. The sacristies from 1882 on each side of the choir were demolished in the 1950s renovations and a new sacristy extension was built on the north side of the choir.

== Media gallery ==

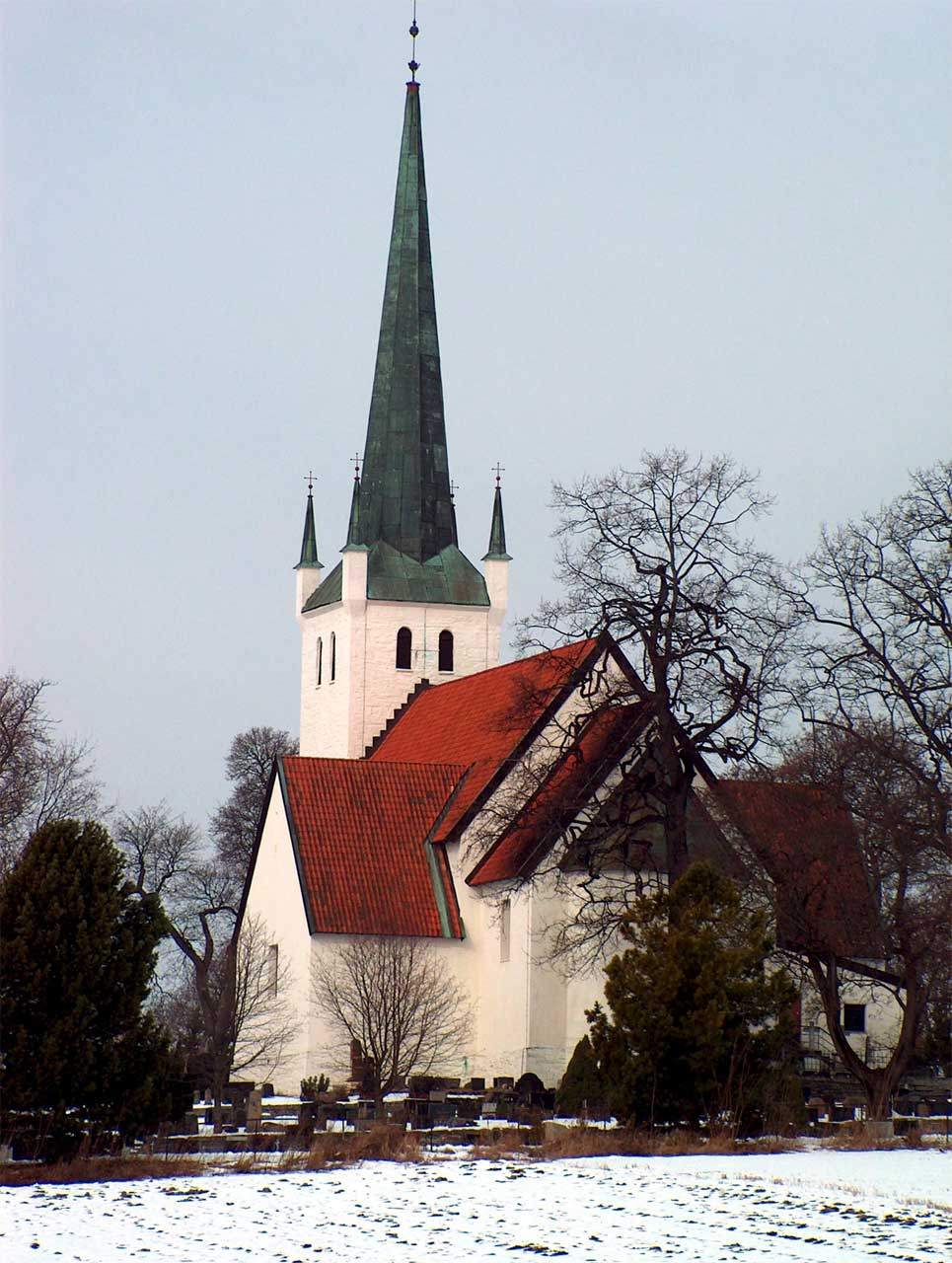

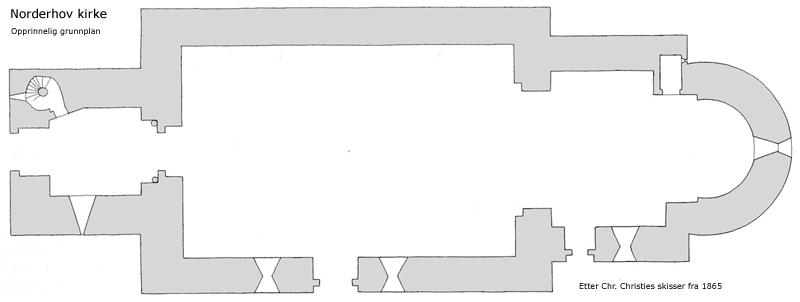

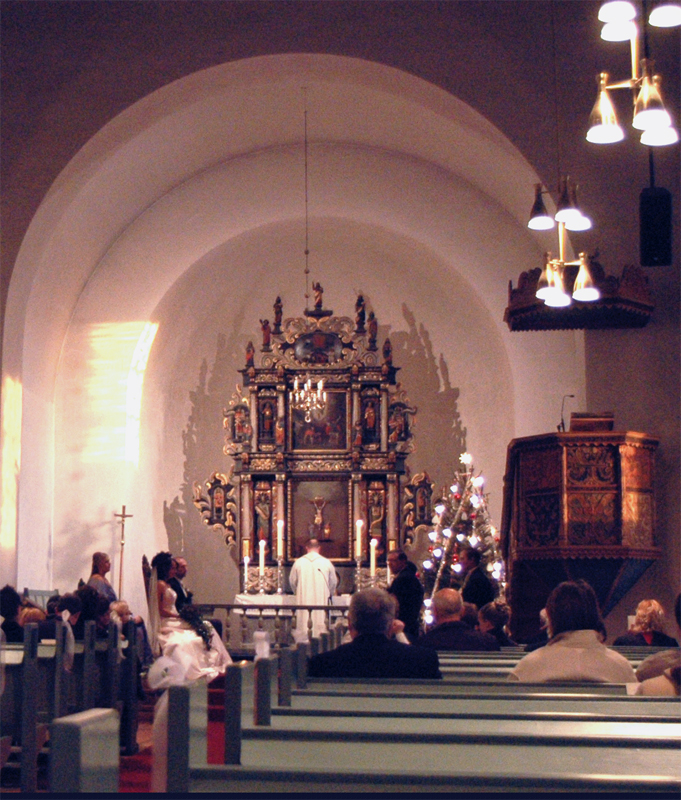

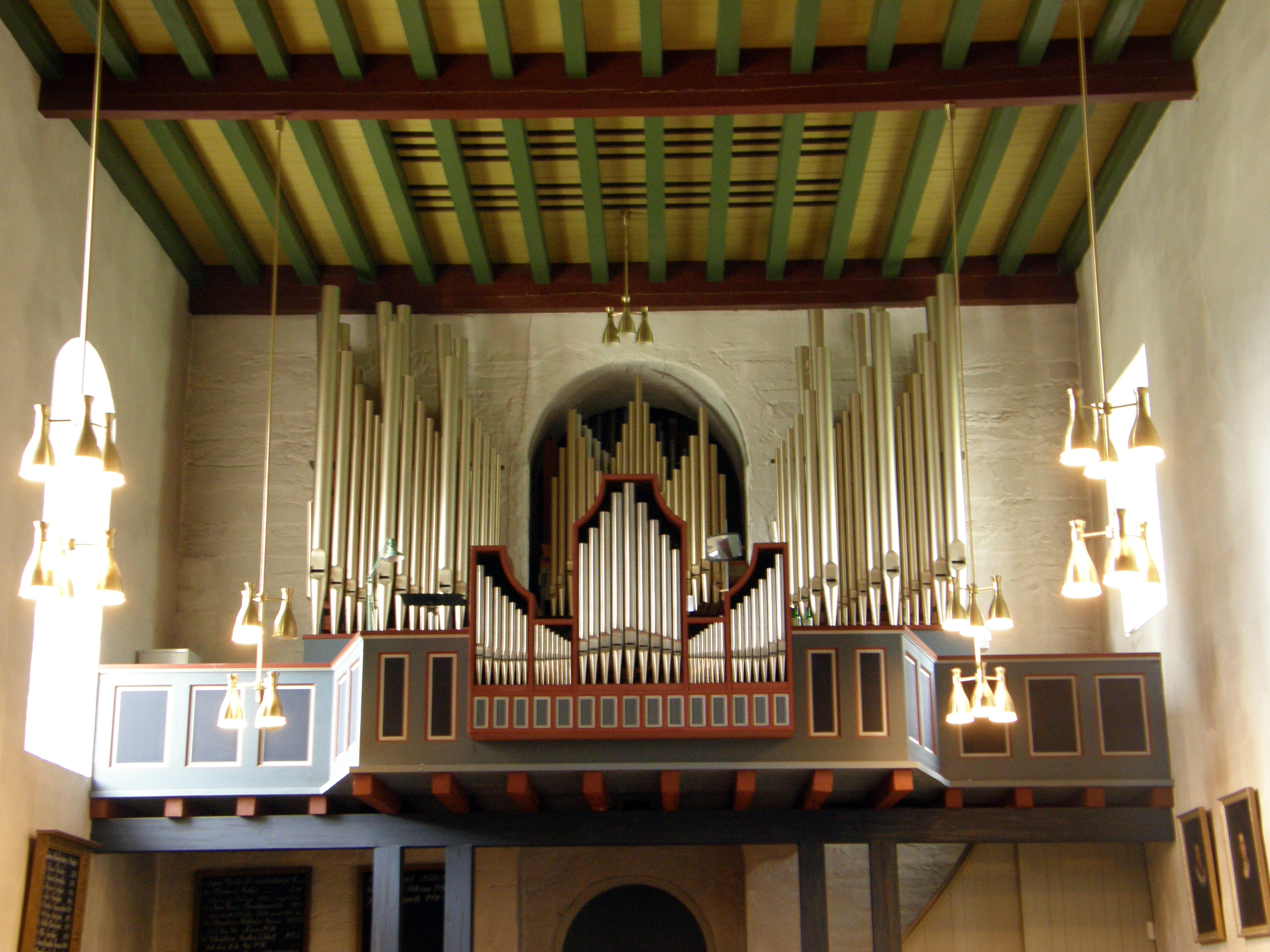

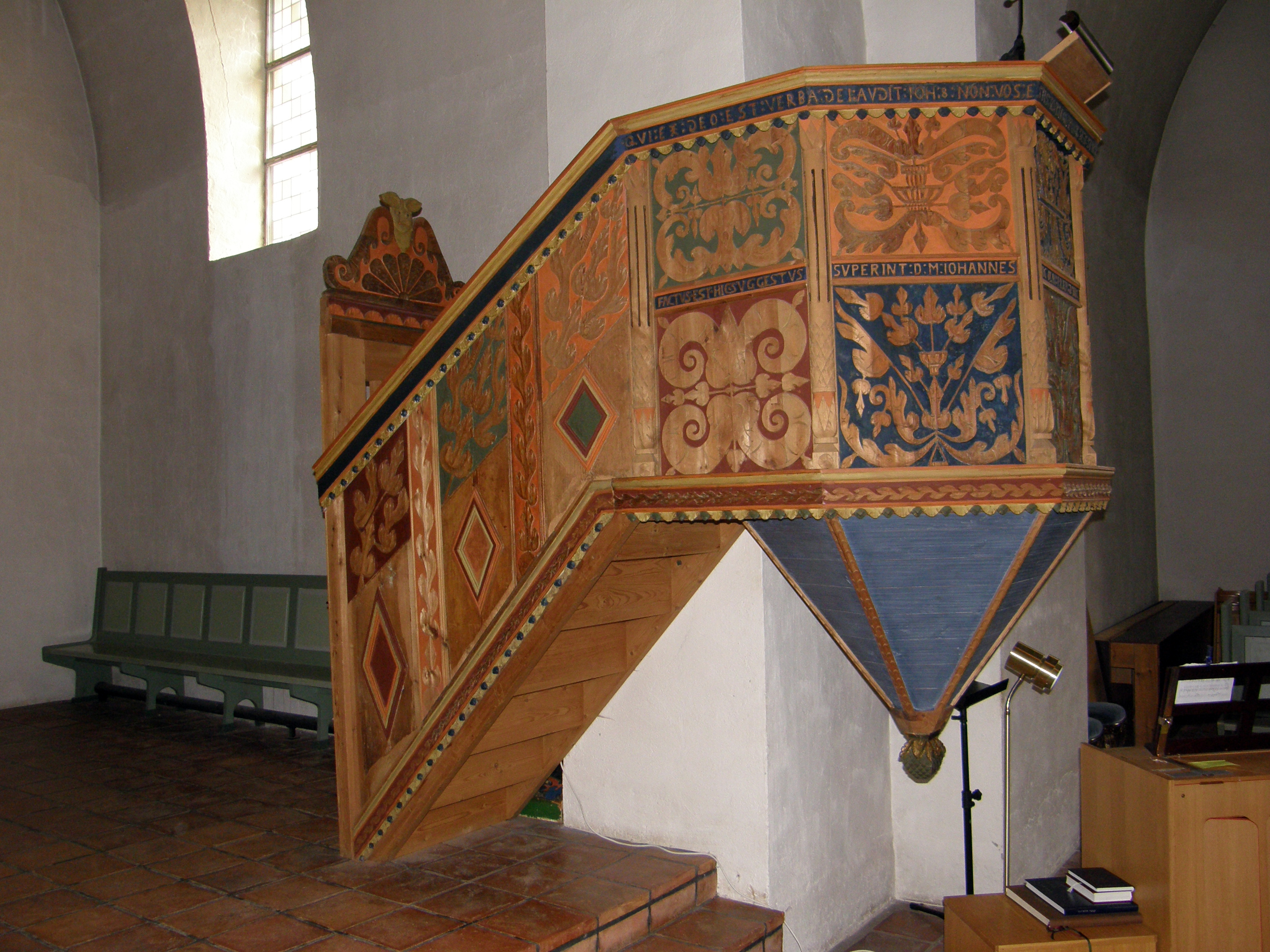

== See also ==
- List of churches in Tunsberg
