= Sandvand =

Sandvand is a Norwegian surname. Notable people with the surname include:

- Kåre Sandvand (1932–2010), Norwegian illustrator
- Ole Johan Sandvand (born 1947), Norwegian health executive
- Margrethe Sandvand (born 1973), Norwegian designer
