= Hønefoss Church =

Church in Buskerud, Norway

- Hønefoss kirke
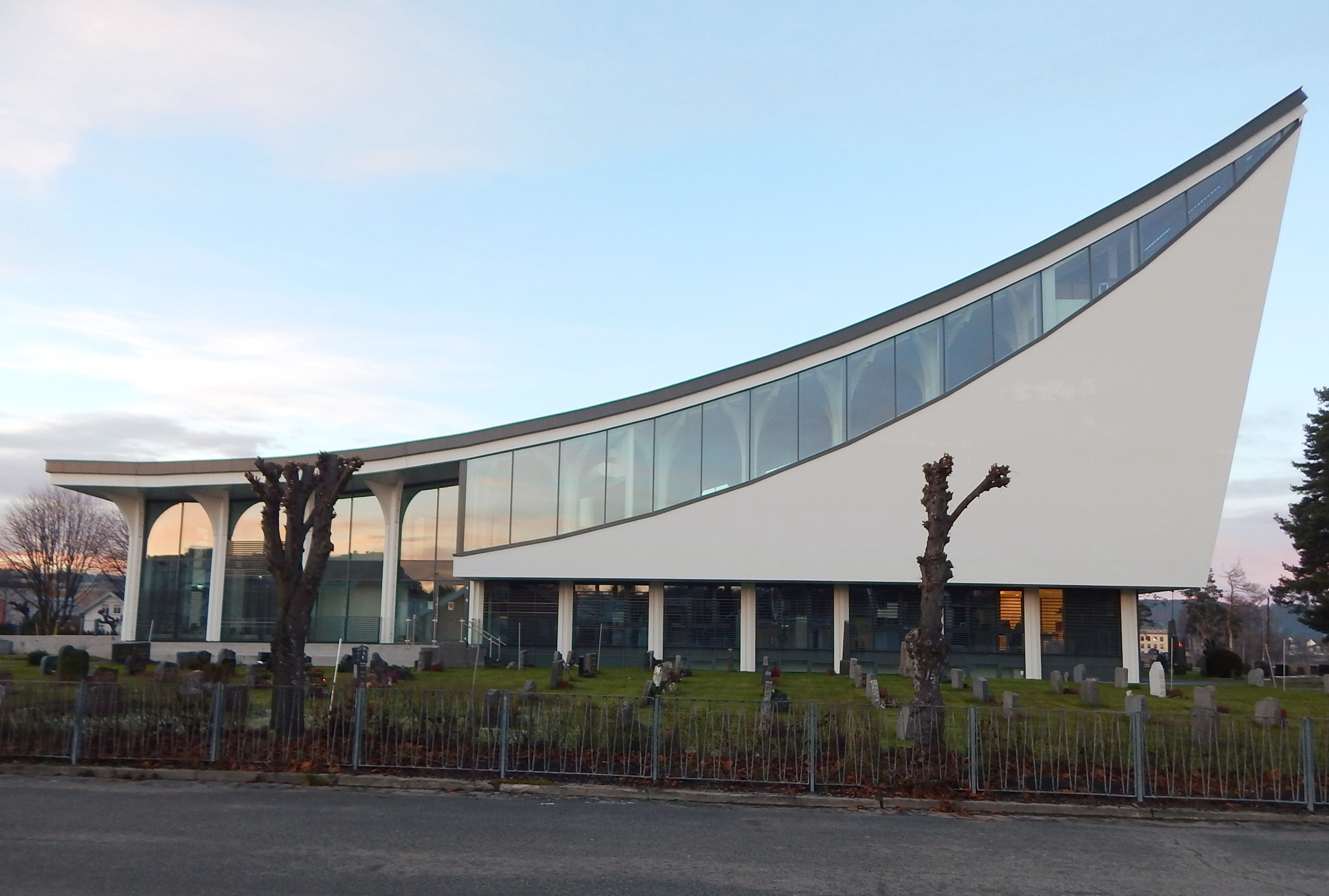
- View of the church
- Hønefoss Church
- 60°10′00″N 10°15′36″E
- Location: Ringerike, Buskerud
- Country: Norway
- Denomination: Church of Norway
- Churchmanship: Evangelical Lutheran

History
- Status: Parish church
- Founded: 1862
- Consecrated: 10 Dec 2017

Architecture
- Functional status: Active
- Architect: Link Arkitektur
- Architectural type: Fan-shaped
- Style: Modern
- Completed: 2017 (9 years ago)

Specifications
- Capacity: 350
- Materials: Concrete

Administration
- Diocese: Tunsberg
- Deanery: Ringerike prosti
- Parish: Hønefoss
- Norwegian Cultural Heritage Site
- Type: Church
- Status: Not protected
- ID: 84695

Hønefoss Church (Norwegian: Hønefoss kirke) is a parish church of the Church of Norway in Ringerike Municipality in Buskerud county, Norway. It is located in the town of Hønefoss. It is the church for the Hønefoss parish which is part of the Ringerike prosti (deanery) in the Diocese of Tunsberg. The white, concrete and glass church was built in a modern fan-shaped style in 2017 using plans drawn up by the architectural firm, Link Arkitektur. The church seats about 350 people.

The historic wooden Hønefoss Church burned down to the ground on 26 January 2010. The new replacement church was constructed on site and opened during 2017.

== History ==
The area of Ringerike has many old churches, and over time, Hønefoss grew into a significant industrial site. Hønefoss was granted town status in 1852. The entire town was then placed under the Norderhov Church parish, but a new, separate church for the town was planned. The church architect Christian Heinrich Grosch was hired to draw plans for the church and he submitted drawings for it in 1858. Approval was obtained, the church was built. The new Hønefoss Church was consecrated on 10 December 1862. The church was a wooden long church with approximately 350 seats. The church received a new chapel, which was dedicated in 1894. The church was restored shortly after 1950 and stood ready for the reopening in 1952. The church had its own cemetery, burial chapel, crematorium, and a modern assembly room (referred to as Kirkestua).

=== Fire ===
The fire department in Ringerike Municipality received the notification that Hønefoss Church was on fire shortly before at 5:00 pm on Tuesday, 26 January 2010. The church building was quickly overtaken by the fire and despite the work of the firefighters, the church burned down quickly and could not be saved. The 40-meter (130 ft) church tower collapsed around 6:00 pm. In November 2009, it had been discovered that there were twelve faults in the electrical system of the church, and the police investigation after the fire concluded that faulty contact in a cable for the electric heating ovens was indeed the cause of the fire. During the summer of 2010, the fire site was cleared, and an open-air altar with remains of burnt planks was set up. After this, the parish began planning for a new church on the same site.

=== New building ===
An architectural competition was held to determine who would design the new building. The winner of the architectural competition was Link Arkitektur, with their design titled Himmeltrærne. The foundation stone was laid on 29 May 2016 and it was built during 2016 and 2017. The new church was consecrated on 10 December 2017. The new church stands on the same site as the old one and it is surrounded by graves on three of its four sides. The building has a somewhat unconventional appearance for a church. It is lowest at the entrance in the west, and the roof swings up towards the east (and is slightly distorted).

== Media gallery ==
Current building

Previous building

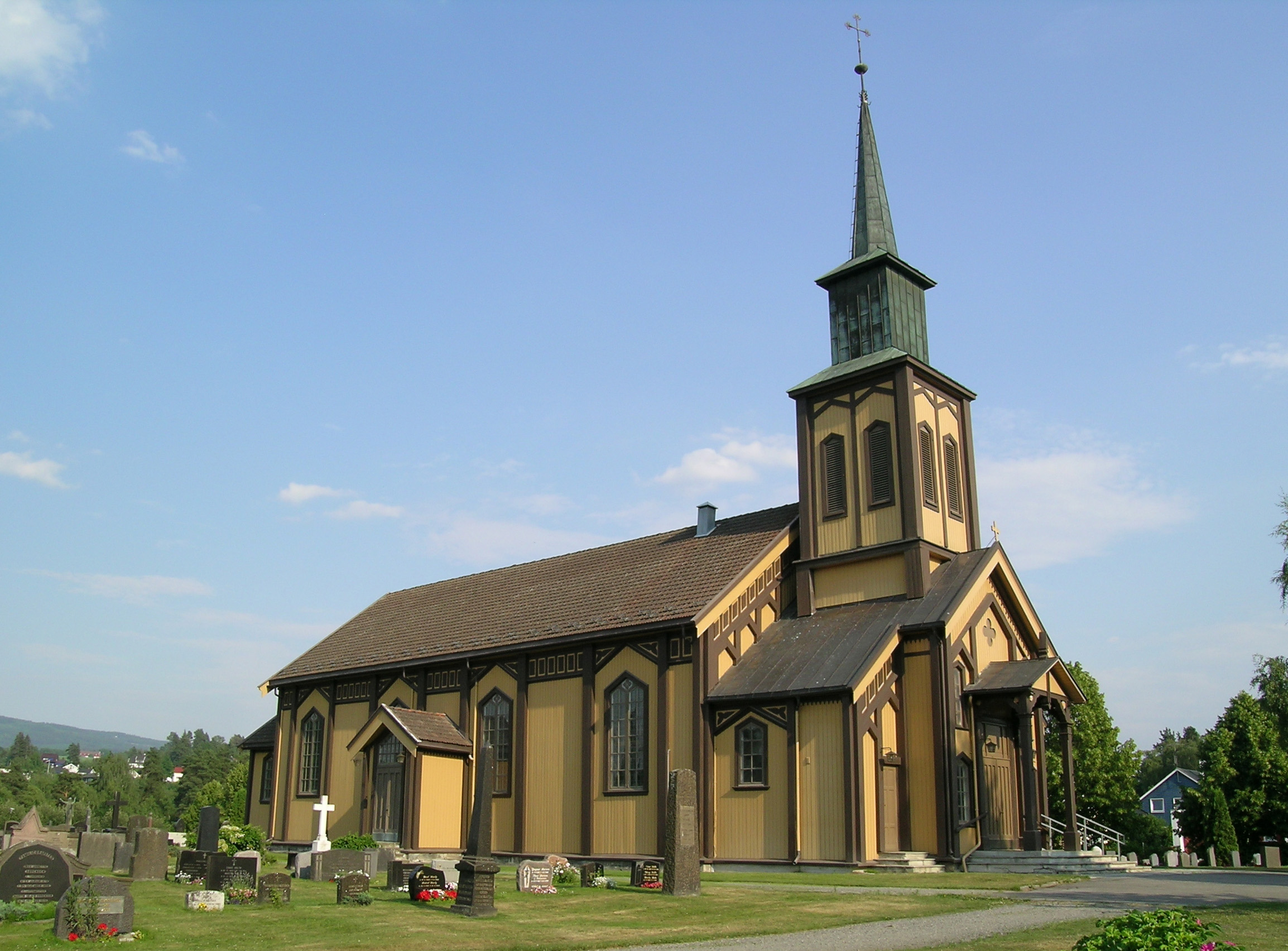

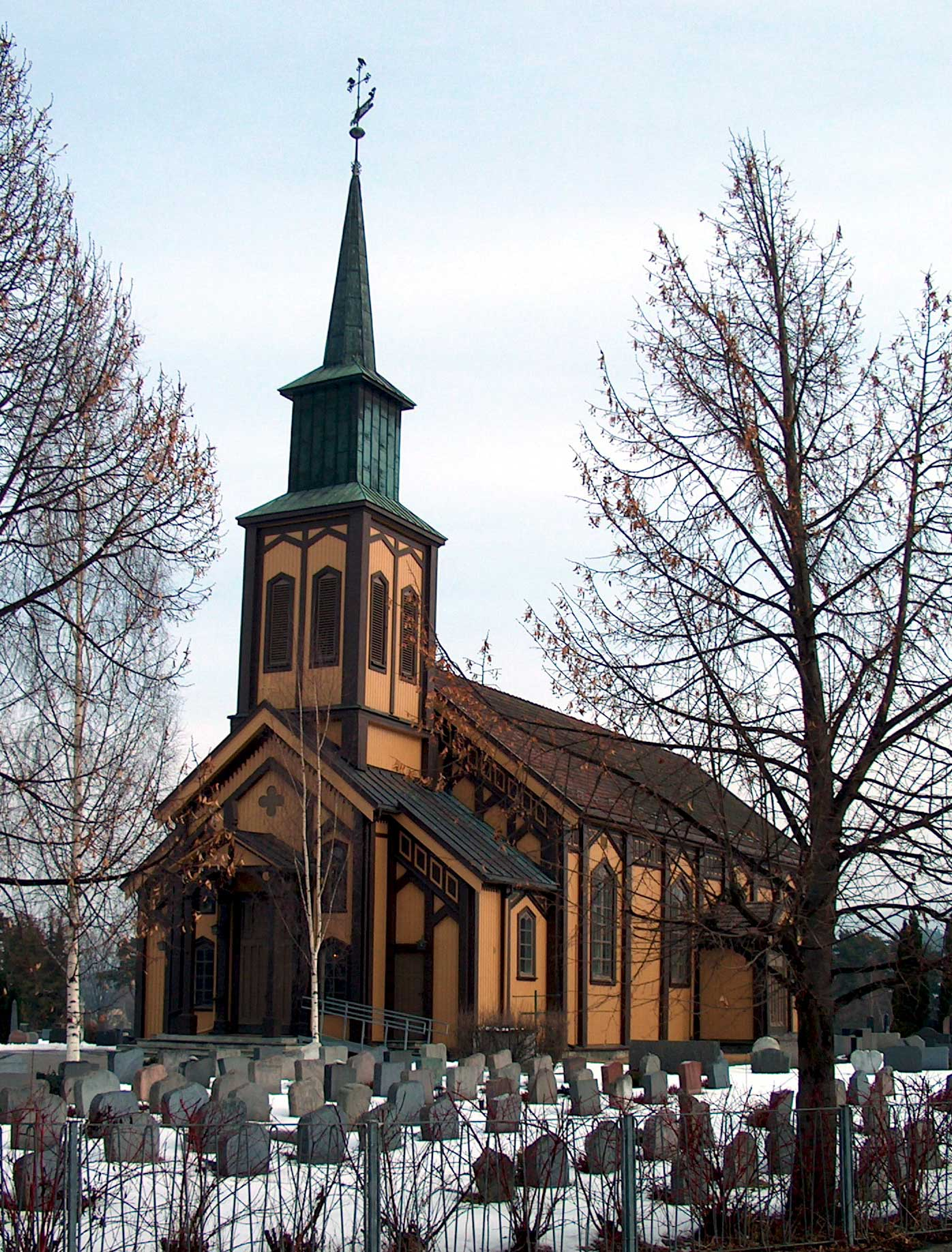

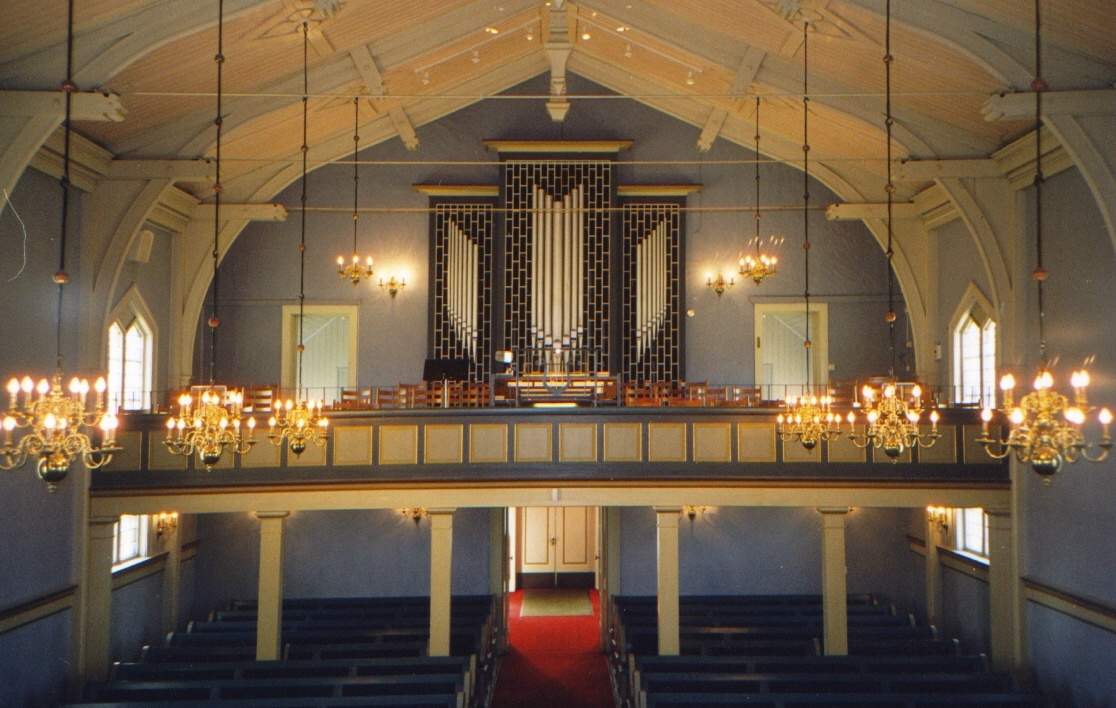
The organ, built by J. H. Jørgensen, Oslo, in 1940 and given to the church by Hønefoss Sparebank.

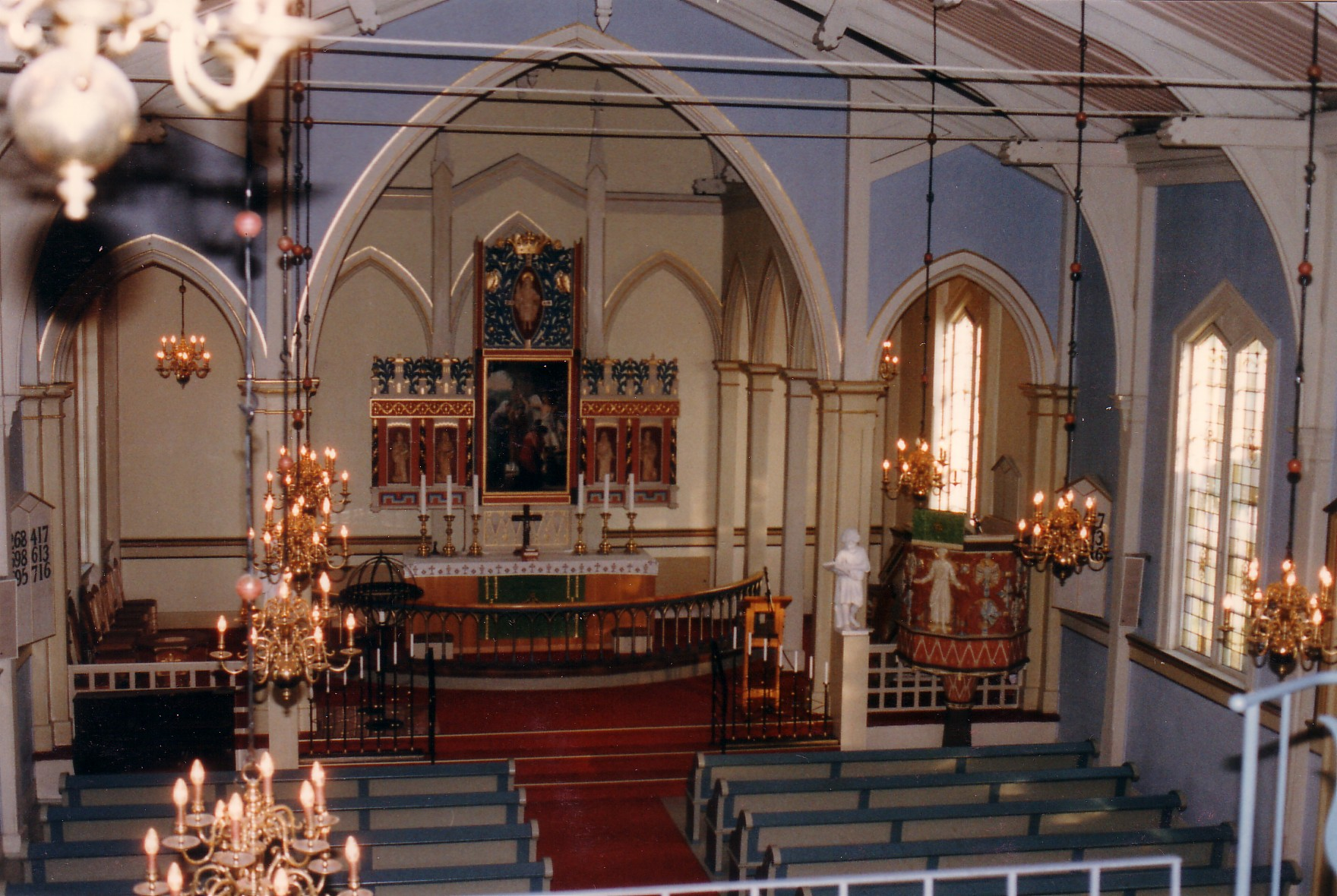
Interior of the old church

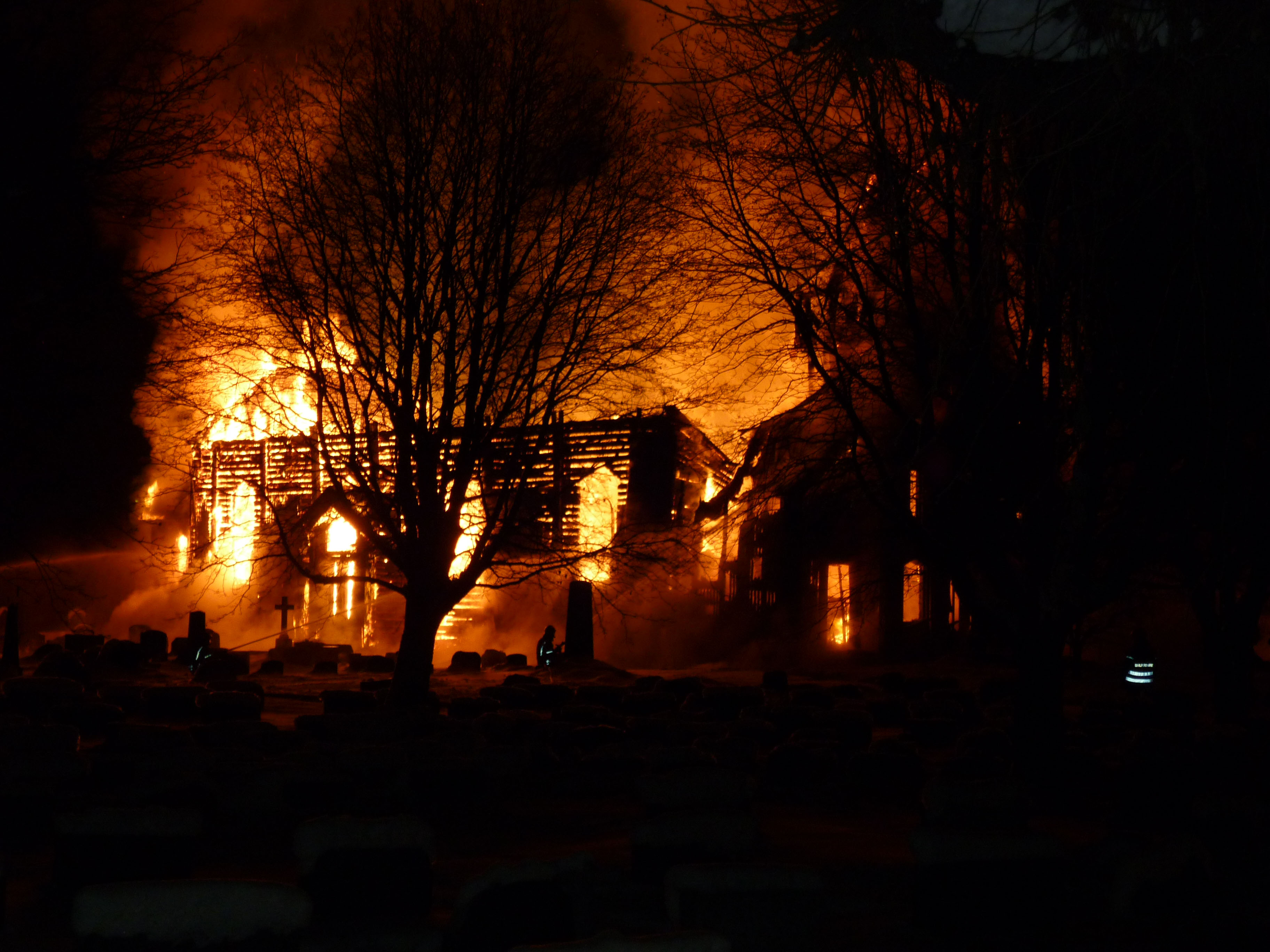
View of the fire

View of the fire

== See also ==
- List of churches in Tunsberg
