= Lasse Trædal (missionary) =

Norwegian schoolteacher and missionary

Lasse Trædal (1923 – 31 December 2010) was a Norwegian schoolteacher and missionary leader.

He worked as a schoolteacher in Haugesund and Ski, but was better known as the managing director of the Norwegian Mission Behind the Iron Curtain (now: the Stefanus Alliance International) from 1982 to 1989. The purpose of the organization was to spread the Christian gospel in the Eastern Bloc, working for human rights.
