= Ottar Helge Johannessen =

Norwegian artist

Ottar Helge Johannessen (23 March 1929 – 25 November 2010) was a Norwegian artist.

He was born and died in Mandal. He took education at the Norwegian National Academy of Fine Arts from 1955 to 1958, and is best known for his woodcuts, etchings and mosaics. Apart from being an active artist, he tutored students at the Norwegian National Academy of Craft and Art Industry between 1967 and 1982.
