= Anders Christian Gogstad =

Norwegian professor of medicine

Anders Christian Gogstad (17 November 1923 – 30 June 2010) was a Norwegian professor of medicine.

After the cand.med. degree he specialized in neurology in 1957, took the dr.med. degree in 1968 and specialized in social medicine in 1976. He was a professor of social medicine at the University of Bergen from 1977 to 1993. He published on health in Norway during World War II.
