= Berge Sæberg =

Norwegian politician (1923–2010)

Berge Sæberg (12 July 1923 – 1 April 2010) was a Norwegian politician for the Centre Party.

He served as a deputy representative to the Parliament of Norway from Hordaland during the terms 1969–1973, 1973–1977 and 1977–1981. In total, he met during 44 days of parliamentary session.
