= Olaug Abrahamsen =

Norwegian politician (1928–2010)

Olaug Abrahamsen (6 July 1928 – 4 January 2010) was a Norwegian politician for the Labour Party.

She was born in Lyngdal Municipality as a daughter of farmer Ola Steinsland (1902–1985). She had modest education, but attended Kvås Folk High School from 1945 to 1946 and Southern Norway Christian Folk High School in 1949. She held miscellaneous low-paying jobs throughout her career.

She was a member of Lyngdal school board from 1963 to 1975 (and the county school board from 1975 to 1979), and the municipal council of Lyngdal Municipality from 1971 to 1983. From 1979 to 1983 she was also a member of Vest-Agder county council. She served as a deputy representative to the Parliament of Norway from Vest-Agder during the terms 1977–1981. In total she met during 157 days of parliamentary session.

She chaired her local party chapter from 1980 to 1981. She was also involved in the local branches of Arbeidernes Opplysningsforbund and the Norwegian Heart and Lung Patient Organization.
