= Haakon Sandvold =

Norwegian engineer and businessman

Haakon Sandvold (1 December 1921 – 24 July 2010) was a Norwegian engineer and businessman.

He was born in Bergen, and graduated as a siv.ing. from the Norwegian Institute of Technology in 1948. He worked at the Chr. Michelsen Institute and the Institute for Nuclear Energy from 1948 to 1951 and the Massachusetts Institute of Technology from 1951 to 1953, then the Chr. Michelsen Institute again. He then entered private enterprise. He was hired in Norsk Hydro 1957, became vice president of Årdal og Sunndal Verk in 1966 and director-general from 1975 to 1986.

After the merger between Hydro and Årdal og Sunndal Verk, he sat on Hydro's board of directors. He was also chairman of NTNF from 1975 to 1979 and chaired the Norwegian Polytechnic Society from 1972 to 1974. He was also president of the Deutsch-Norwegische Handelskammer, and trained the Norwegian delegation for the Earth Summit in 1992. He held the Royal Norwegian Order of St. Olav and the Federal Cross of Merit.
