= Per Dalin =

Norwegian educationalist (1936–2010)

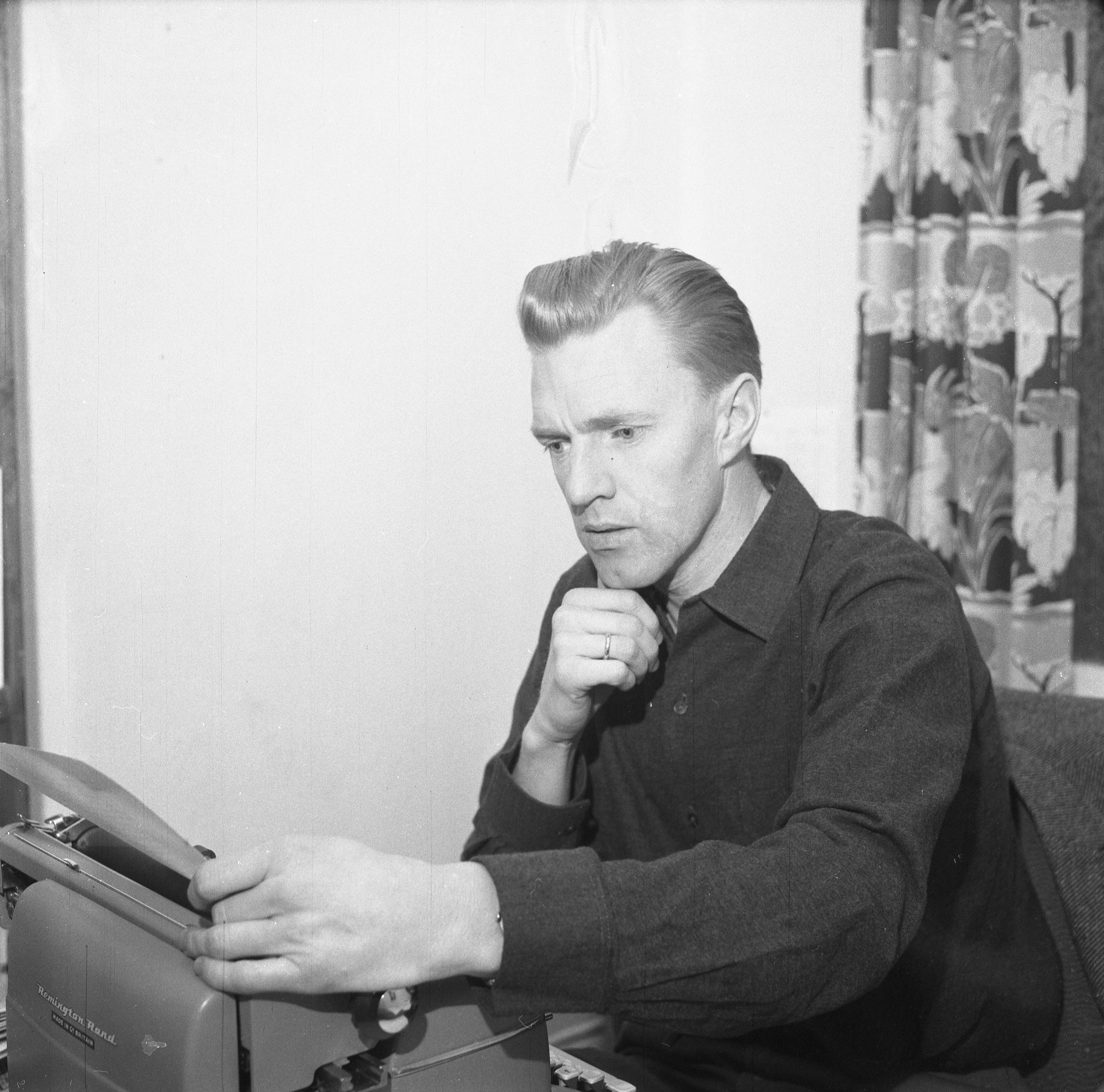
- Portrait of Dalin in 1966 by Sirik Sundvor
- Born: 19 November 1936; Oslo, Norway
- Died: March 10, 2010 (aged 73)
- Occupation: Educationalist

Per Dalin (19 November 1936 – 10 March 2010) was a Norwegian educationalist.

== Biography ==
Dalin was born in Oslo on 19 November 1936. He received his master's degree in 1963 and the Ph.D. in 1973. He cofounded the International Movement Towards Educational Change in 1974, and was also director. He was also research director at OECD's Centre for Educational Research and Innovation, and an adjunct professor at the University of Oslo from 1994.
