= Hallgrim Kløve =

Norwegian psychologist

- Born: 22 June 1927; Moss, Norway
- Died: 25 January 2010 (aged 82)
- Occupation: Psychologist

Hallgrim Kløve (22 June 1927 – 25 January 2010) was a Norwegian psychologist.

Kløve was born in Moss. He was assigned as researcher at the Indiana University, and was appointed professor at the University of Wisconsin in 1970. He worked at the University of Bergen from 1971. His research fields were neuropsychology and epilepsy.
