= Knut Bjøro =

Norwegian physician (1925–2010)

Knut Jahr Bjøro (9 September 1925 – 31 March 2010) was a Norwegian physician.

He was born in Skedsmo. He took the Dr. Med. degree in 1966. He worked at Rikshospitalet, and was hired as a docent at the University of Oslo. He was a professor from 1971 to his retirement, and his specialties were obstetrics and gynaecology. He died in March 2010.
