= Terje Sølsnes =

Norwegian television personality (born 1945)

Terje Egilsønn Sølsnes (born 10 March 1945) is a Norwegian television personality.

He hails from Uranienborg and took secondary education at Oslo Commerce School, and worked in Bankenes Betalingssentral before applying for a job as continuity announcer in the Norwegian Broadcasting Corporation in 1979. He was hired, and held this job for decades. He also had other engagements in the same channel, including a children's show named Hjemme hos meg (1988) and a breakfast show Frokost-TV. He also had the radio music show Musikk for deg, kanskje for meg? in the 1980s.

Sølsnes also had his own company Sølsnes Arrangementer through which he was hired as a master of ceremonies at different events. He has also appeared in stage musicals.
