= Lunder Church =

Church in Buskerud, Norway

- Lunder kirke
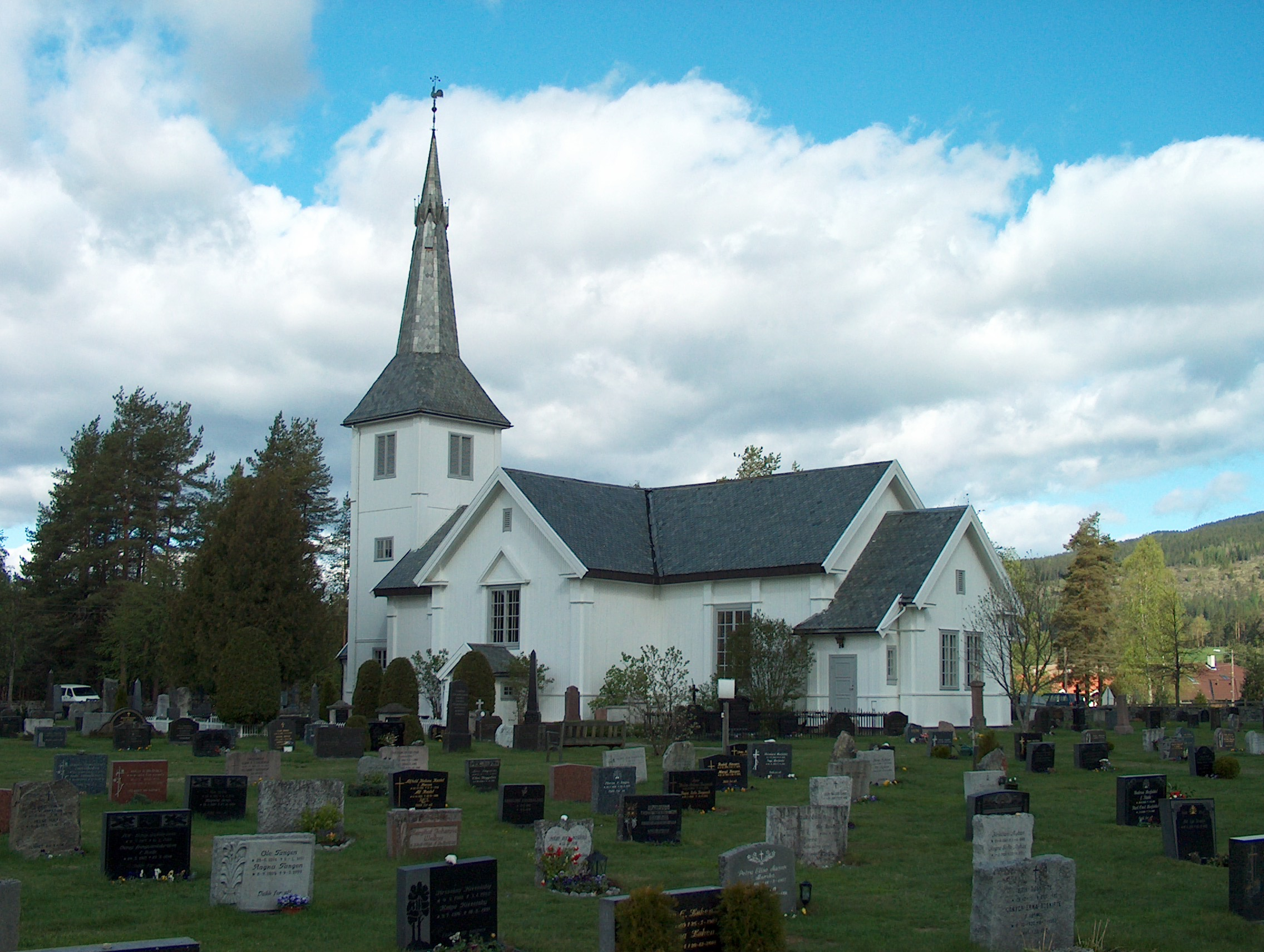
- View of the church
- Lunder Church
- 60°14′31″N 9°55′42″E
- Location: Ringerike, Buskerud
- Country: Norway
- Denomination: Church of Norway
- Previous denomination: Catholic Church
- Churchmanship: Evangelical Lutheran

History
- Status: Parish church
- Founded: 13th century
- Consecrated: 23 Sept 1761

Architecture
- Functional status: Active
- Architectural type: Cruciform
- Completed: 1761 (265 years ago)

Specifications
- Capacity: 300
- Materials: Wood

Administration
- Diocese: Tunsberg
- Deanery: Ringerike prosti
- Parish: Lunder
- Norwegian Cultural Heritage Site
- Type: Church
- Status: Automatically protected
- ID: 84339

Lunder Church (Norwegian: Lunder kirke) is a parish church of the Church of Norway in Ringerike Municipality in Buskerud county, Norway. It is located in the village of Sokna. It is one of the churches for the Lunder parish which is part of the Ringerike prosti (deanery) in the Diocese of Tunsberg. The white, wooden church was built in a cruciform design in 1761 using plans drawn up by an unknown architect. The church seats about 300 people.

== History ==
The earliest existing historical records of the church date back to the year 1574, but the church was not built that year. The first church in Sokna was a small wooden stave church that was probably built in the 13th century. It is said to have stood at Kirkehaugen about 1 kilometre (0.62 mi) northwest of the current church site. The church measured about 10 by 6 metres (33 ft × 20 ft) and is said to have room for 5 chairs on either side of the main aisle. The church was likely in use after the Black Death, but due to the small numbers of people in the area, the church was not used very often and it was not maintained well.

In the early 1700s, it was decided that a new church would be built about 300 metres (980 ft) southeast of the old church site. The new church was built by Niels Olsen Onsagger and it was consecrated on 14 February 1706. The new cruciform stave church was named Vor Frelsers kirke (lit. 'Our Savior's Church'). The church, like most other churches in Norway, was sold into private ownership during the Norwegian church sale in 1723 to help the King pay off war debts. In 1739, the owner of the church sold it back to the local residents.

On 25 December 1759, permission was granted to move the church to the present site about 700 metres (2,300 ft) to the southeast. The old site was determined to be bad because the ground was too wet around it which had been causing near constant repairs to the building because parts of the foundation kept sinking. At the new church site, a new cruciform church was built, reusing some of the old materials from the previous church. The new church was consecrated on 23 September 1761. The new church had a timber-framed cruciform design with a bell tower in the west. The choir was in the eastern transept. In the 1880s, the church was renovated using plans by Henrik Nissen. During this time, the cross-arms were made a little smaller, the tower was rebuilt, and a new sacristy was added. The church was restored again in 1922–1924 according to plans by Ole Stein and reopened on 20 July 1924. The church porch in front of the west tower dates from this time and replaced a larger porch from the 1880s.

== Media gallery ==

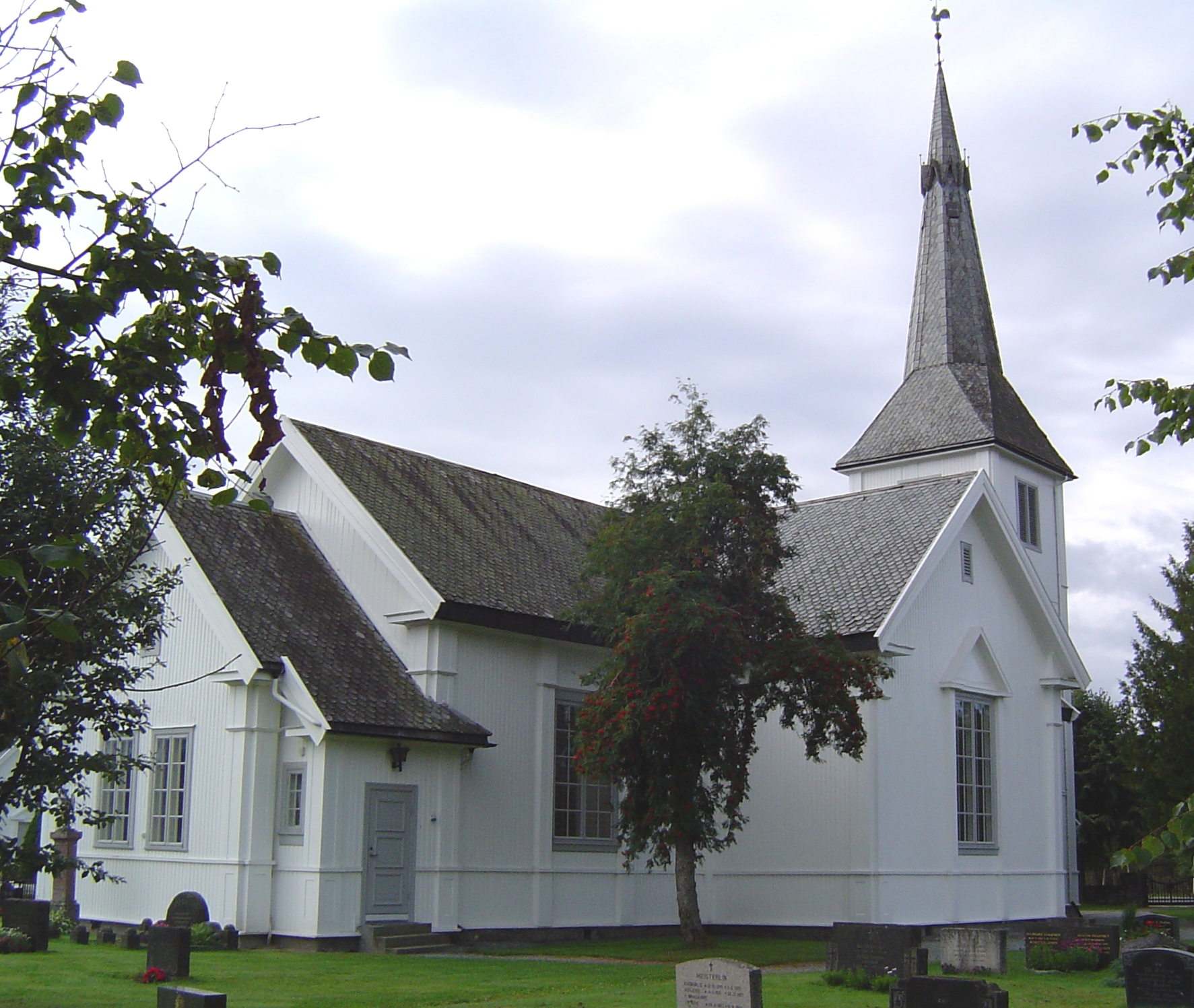

== See also ==
- List of churches in Tunsberg
