= Haug Church (Øvre Eiker) =

Church in Buskerud, Norway

- Haug kirke
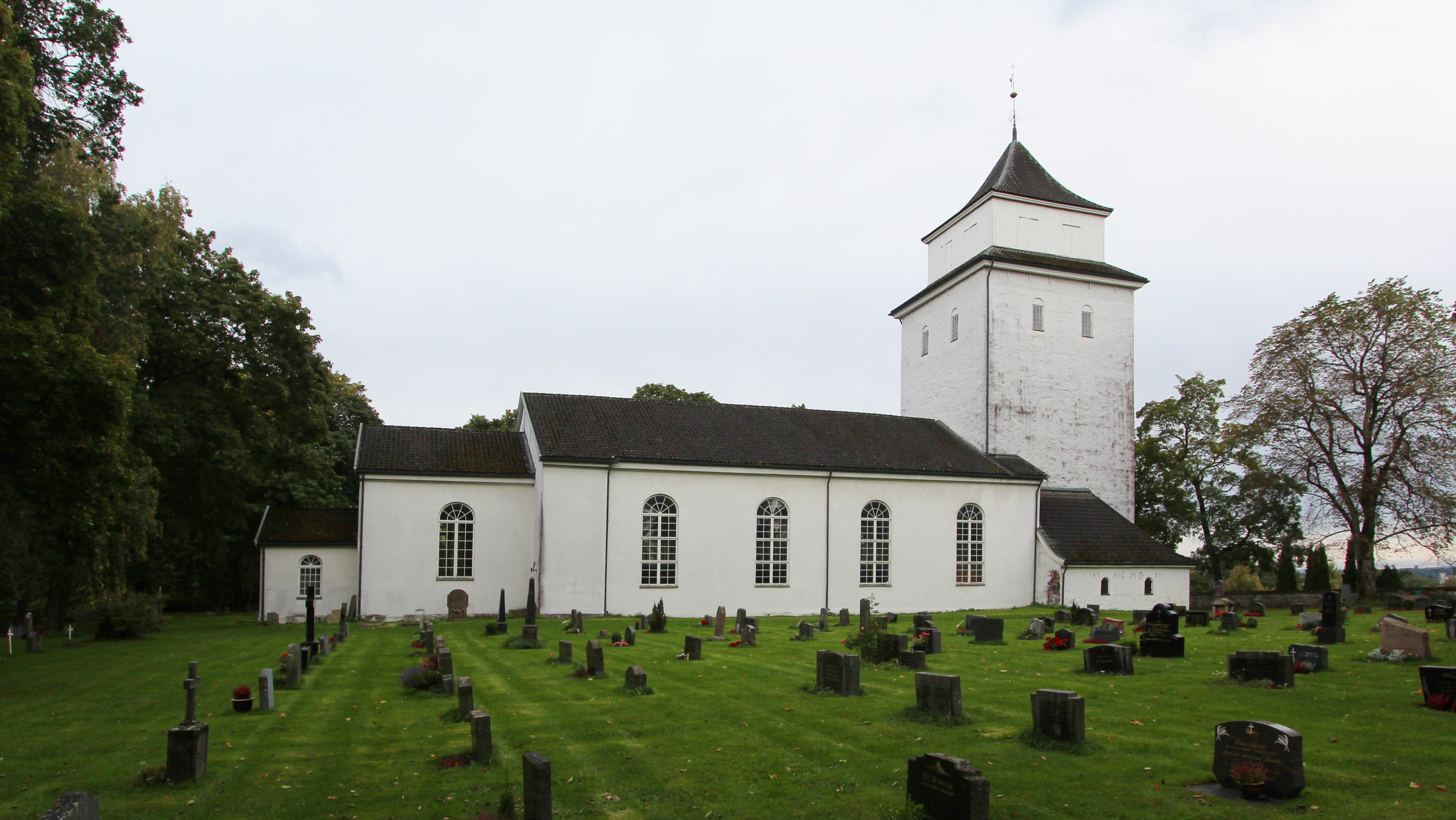
- View of the church
- Haug Church
- 59°45′52″N 9°54′17″E
- Location: Øvre Eiker, Buskerud
- Country: Norway
- Denomination: Church of Norway
- Previous denomination: Catholic Church
- Churchmanship: Evangelical Lutheran

History
- Status: Parish church
- Founded: c. 1152
- Consecrated: 13th century

Architecture
- Functional status: Active
- Architectural type: Long church
- Completed: 13th century

Specifications
- Capacity: 320
- Materials: Stone

Administration
- Diocese: Tunsberg
- Deanery: Eiker prosti
- Parish: Haug
- Norwegian Cultural Heritage Site
- Type: Church
- Status: Automatically protected
- ID: 84498

Haug Church (Norwegian: Haug kirke) is a parish church of the Church of Norway in Øvre Eiker Municipality in Buskerud county, Norway. It is located in the village of Hokksund. It is the church for the Haug parish which is part of the Eiker prosti (deanery) in the Diocese of Tunsberg. The white, stone church was built in a long church design in the early 13th century. The church seats about 320 people.

== History ==
The earliest existing historical records of the church date back to the year 1323, but the church was not built that year. The first church at Haug was likely a wooden stave church that built around the mid-12th century. In the Middle Ages, the church was dedicated to Saints Peter and Paul. Around the early-13th century, the church was torn down and replaced with a Romanesque stone church. Some elements from the older wooden structure can still be found in today's church. The nave is rectangular and has second floor seating galleries, and the choir is also rectangular. In the eastern extension off the choir is a sacristy. The church, like most other churches in Norway, was sold into private ownership during the Norwegian church sale in 1723 to help the King pay off war debts. In 1771, a small burial chapel was built next to the north wall of the bell tower. The burial chapel was paid for by Jørgen von Cappelen who built it for his wife Magdalena Darjes who died in 1769.

In 1814, this church served as an election church (Norwegian: valgkirke). Together with more than 300 other parish churches across Norway, it was a polling station for elections to the 1814 Norwegian Constituent Assembly which wrote the Constitution of Norway. This was Norway's first national election. Each church parish was a constituency that elected people called "electors" who later met together in each county to elect the representatives for the assembly that was to meet at Eidsvoll Manor later that year.

On 14 June 1818, the church was struck by lightning and it caused a large fire, destroying much of the roof and interior of the building. The church was rebuilt using designs by the architect Henrik Thrap-Meyer. The church became municipal property in 1856. In 1858, Wilhelm Hanstein was commissioned to make plans for enlarging the church, which had become too small for the congregation. In 1861, work began on building a new choir and repairing the walls of the nave. Due to the poor condition of the nave walls, however, they ended up demolishing the nave as well. A new nave and choir were built, this time with 60–80 centimetres (24–31 in) thick brick walls instead of the approximately 2-metre (6 ft 7 in) thick stone walls that were used earlier. In 1961-1962, the church was extensively repaired and remodeled again, this time under the direction of Arnstein Arneberg. During this renovation, archaeological excavations were carried out on the site under the direction of Kjeld Magnussen. The church was re-consecrated in 1963.

== Media gallery ==

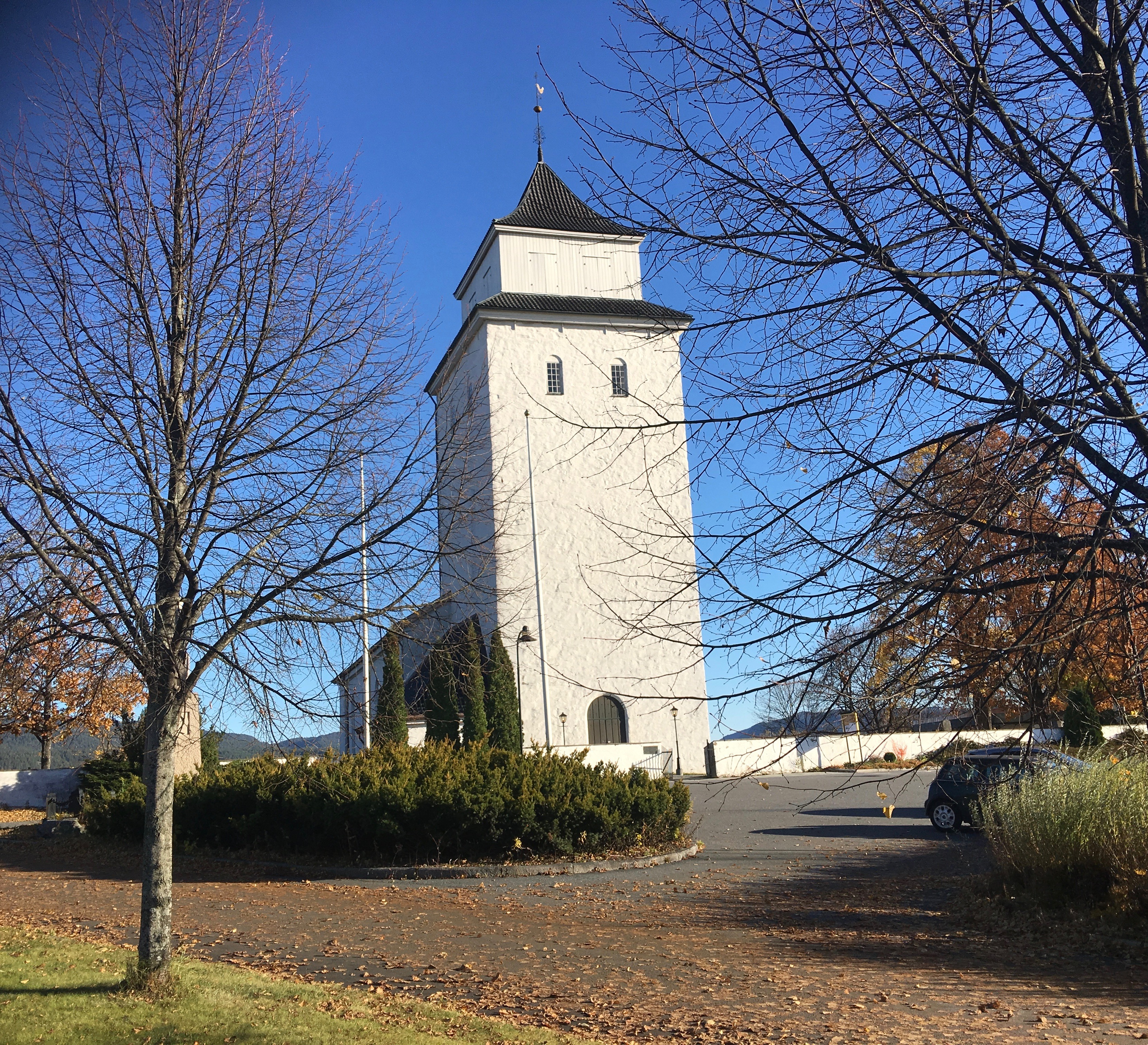

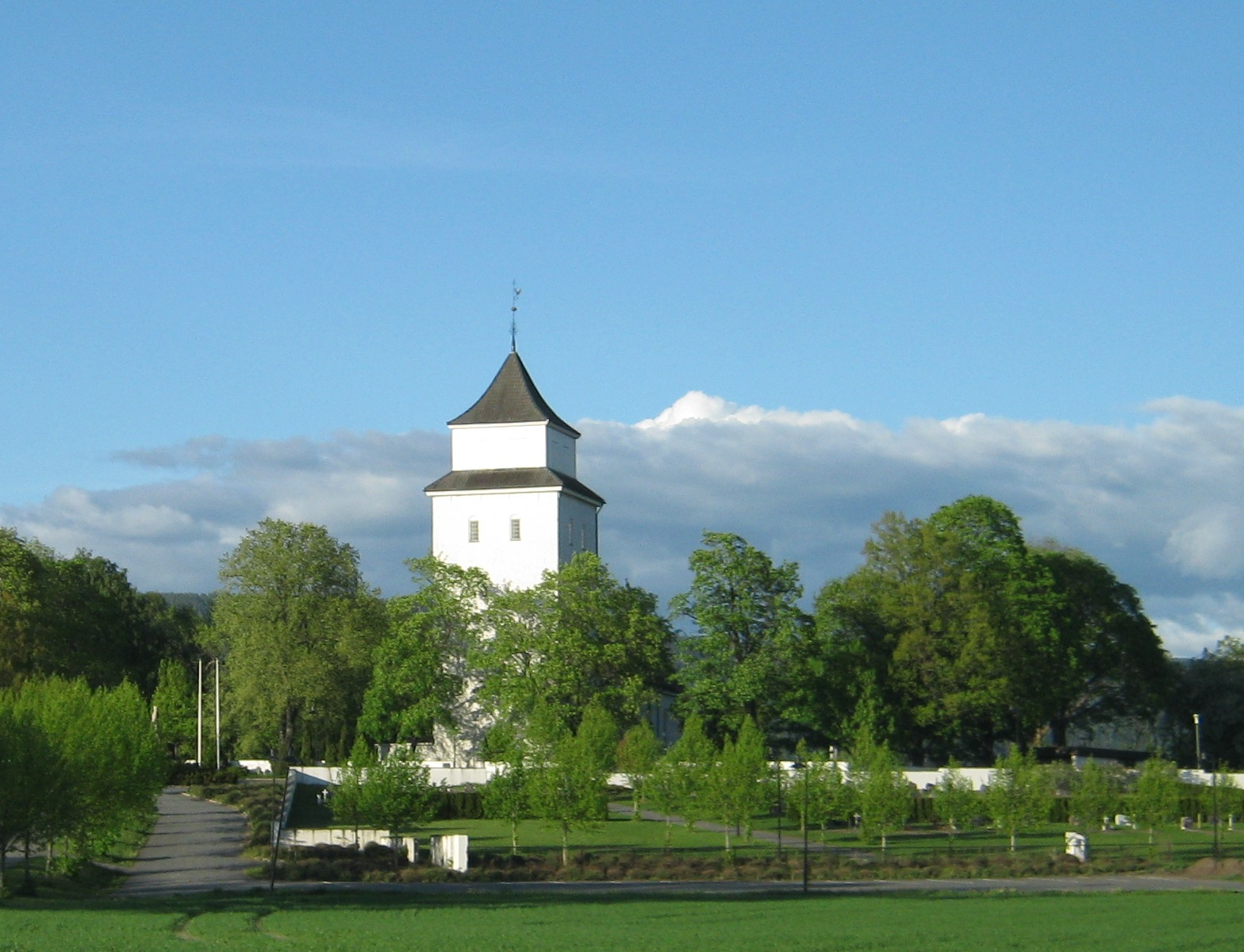

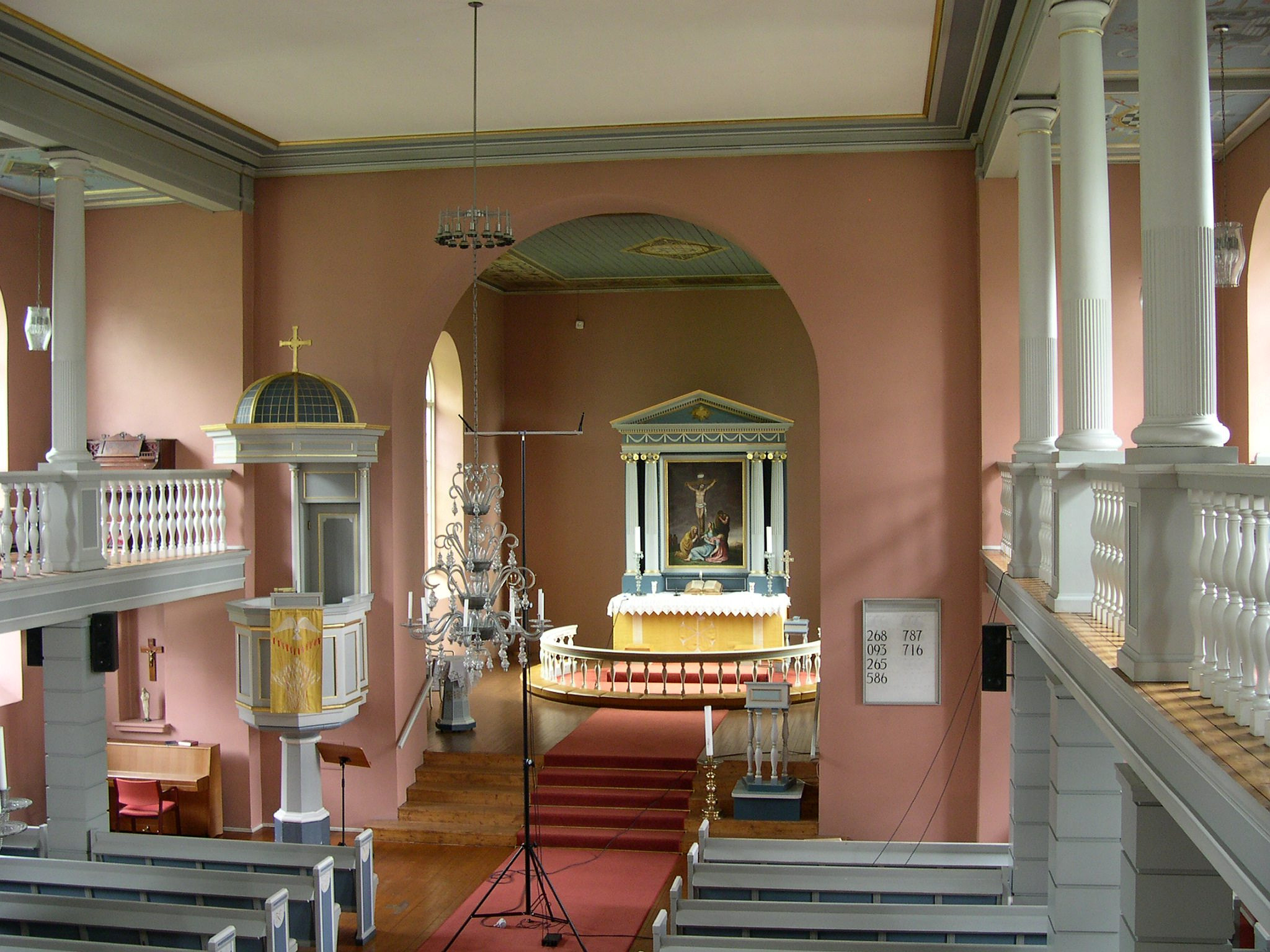

== See also ==
- List of churches in Tunsberg
