= Magne S. Espedal =

Norwegian mathematician

Magne S. Espedal (23 September 1942 – 25 January 2010) was a Norwegian mathematician.

He was born in Fjaler as a son of a smallholder. He finished his secondary education in 1962 and graduated from the University of Oslo with the cand.real. degree in 1966.

Espedal was appointed as an associate professor at the University of Bergen in 1971 before finishing his dr.philos. degree in 1974. He was promoted to docent in 1982 and professor of applied mathematics in 1985. He was also a visiting scholar at the University of Wyoming (1985–86) and Texas A&M University (1993–94). He was inducted into the Norwegian Academy of Science and Letters in 1998.

As a science and education administrator, Espedal sat on the Academic College (the board) of the University of Bergen from 1989, the council of science of NAVF from 1977 to 1984 (chair from 1982–84), the council of NTNF from 1986 to 1993 (deputy chair from 1991–92), and the board of science and technology in the Research Council of Norway from 1993 to 1996. He was also one of the founders of the Centre for Integrated Petroleum Research. Espedal was a visiting scholar at the University of Stuttgart when he died in January 2010, aged 67. After his death, an adjunct professorship at the University of Bergen was named in his honor; the first holder being Margot Gerritsen.
