= Jan Martin Flod =

Norwegian judge

Jan Martin Flod (1947 – 5 October 2010) was a Norwegian judge.

He took the cand.jur. degree in 1974. He was a judge in Oslo City Court before being hired as a presiding judge in Borgarting Court of Appeal in 1990. From 1997 he was a court administrator. Among his important court cases was the murder of Benjamin Hermansen.

He was married and resided at Bærums Verk. In October 2010, while visiting the United States, he died in a car accident east of Spicer, Minnesota.
