= Bjørn Haga =

Norwegian journalist

Bjørn Haga (7 April 1926 – 2010) was a Norwegian journalist.

He was born in Odda Municipality. After finishing his secondary education in 1947 he studied political science between 1949 and 1953, then took one year at the Norwegian Journalist Academy. He began his journalistic career in Nordlys from 1954 to 1959 and Fremtiden from 1959 to 1963. He was a sports journalist, and also wrote about jazz. He later worked for Norwegian Broadcasting Corporation radio and became a news anchor in Dagsrevyen, the main newscast of the Norwegian Broadcasting Corporation, at that time the only television channel in Norway.

The Lund Commission found that Haga was subjected to secret surveillance by the Norwegian Police Security Service in 1968. Haga died in 2010.
