= Sølve Grotmol =

Norwegian television presenter

Sølve Grotmol (29 October 1939 – 30 January 2010) was a Norwegian television personality.

He grew up in Bryne. In the 1960s he was hired by the Norwegian Broadcasting Corporation, working as a news presenter as well as commenting on sports events.

Grotmol died at Mallorca in January 2010.
