= Hans Økland =

Norwegian scientist

Hans Økland (19 August 1918 – 23 April 2010) was a Norwegian meteorologist and geophysicist.

He was born in Trondenes Municipality. He finished his secondary education in Harstad in 1937 and graduated from the University of Oslo with the cand.real. degree in 1942. He worked as a secondary school teacher in Svolvær and Tromsø, as a meteorologist in the Forecasting Division of Northern Norway from 1946 to 1954 and the Norwegian Meteorological Institute from 1954 to 1970. After two years as a researcher at the Meteorological Institute he took his doctorate at the University of Oslo in 1972. In 1977 he was hired as a university lecturer in geophysics, being promoted to professor later. He was a member of the Norwegian Geophysical Society and the Norwegian Academy of Science and Letters. His last academic publication came in 1998, and he died in April 2010, aged 91.
