= Alex Christiansen =

Norwegian architect (1925–2010)

Alex Christiansen (17 February 1925 – 4 July 2010) was a Norwegian architect.

He took his education in Zurich. With his own architect's office, he was central in shaping large residential areas in Oslo like Romsås and Lysejordet. He won an architectural prize from Oslo Municipality in 1984. He died in July 2010 in Bærum.
