= Alv Kragerud =

Norwegian priest and theologian (1932–2010)

Alv Kragerud (20 August 1932 – 21 April 2010) was a Norwegian priest and theologian.

He was born in Høland. He took his cand.theol. degree at the University of Oslo, and took practical-theological education at Uppsala University. He did research while working as a priest, and took his first doctorate with Der Lieblingsjünger im Johannesevangelium in 1958 and the second doctorate with the thesis Die Hymnen der Pistis Sophia in 1967. He was a professor at the University of Bergen, and a member of the Norwegian Academy of Science and Letters. In addition to research in Christianity and the history of religion, he was skilled in the languages Greek, Hebraic, Egyptian, Coptic, Sumerian and Old Norse. He died in April 2010.
