= Kjell Landmark =

Norwegian politician (1930–2010)

Kjell Landmark (14 October 1930 – 21 October 2010) was a Norwegian poet and politician, born in Arendal. He was one of the founders of the party Sosialistisk Folkeparti, today's Socialist Left. He was central in the struggle against Norwegian membership of the European Economic Community, which ended in a 1972 referendum rejecting membership. Also a writer, Landmark published two collections of poems.
