= Åsmund Apeland =

Norwegian politician

Åsmund Apeland (24 March 1930 – 17 October 2010) was a Norwegian politician for the Centre Party.

He served as a deputy representative to the Parliament of Norway from Rogaland during the term 1969–1973. In total he met during 10 days of parliamentary session.
