= Kjell Fjørtoft =

Norwegian journalist and writer (1930–2010)

- Born: 5 March 1930; Tromsø, Norway
- Died: 14 May 2010 (aged 80); Tromsø, Norway
- Occupations: Journalist, non-fiction writer, photographer and film maker

Kjell Fjørtoft (5 March 1930 – 14 May 2010) was a Norwegian journalist, non-fiction writer, photographer and film maker, born in Tromsø.

Fjørtoft wrote books about themes such as World War II, espionage and hunters. Among his books are Spionfamilien from 1986, about the convicted spy Selmer Nilsen and his family. He produced 25 television programmes for the Norwegian Broadcasting Corporation, and also produced more than thirty film documentaries about Northern Norway. He was awarded Troms County's Cultural Prize for 1983. Fjørtoft died on 14 May 2010.

== Selected works ==
=== Books ===
- Troms med bankene utenfor (1966)
- Dramaet på Arnøy (1981)
- Vi fikk vår frihet (1984)
- Spionfamilien (1986)
- Mot stupet. Norge inn i krigen (1989)
- Ulvetiden. Krig og samarbeid (1990)
- På feil side. Den andre krigen (1991)
- Oppgjøret som aldri tok slutt (1997)

=== Films ===
- Hummerfisket på Nordøyane (1959)
- Lille Moskva (1983)
