= Rolf Nyboe Nettum =

Norwegian literary historian and professor

Rolf Nyboe Nettum (17 June 1919 – 20 January 2010) was a Norwegian literary historian and professor at the University of Oslo.

== Biography ==
He grew up at Sandviksåsen in Sandvika, where he was a neighbor of polar explorer Otto Sverdrup (1854–1930).

Nettum attended upper secondary school at Stabekk. He later became a student at the University of Oslo, but during the occupation of Norway by Nazi Germany (1940–1945) he was arrested on 30 November 1943, as a part of the general crackdown that followed the University of Oslo fire. He was imprisoned near Stavern before being transferred to Buchenwald concentration camp on 7 January 1944. He was later transferred to Sennheim concentration camp, then back to Buchenwald before being released on 20 December 1944.

In the spring of 1948, Rolf Nettum submitted his dissertation En undersølelse av Hans E. Kincks livssyn. He was a guest lecturer at the University of Chicago from 1951 to 1953. He then moved back to Norway and was a literary critic in the newspaper Aftenposten from 1954 to 1964. In 1958 he was also hired at the University of Oslo. He remained here until his retirement in 1986, being a professor for the last years.

Nettum took the dr.philos. degree in 1970 on a thesis about Knut Hamsun. He came to be cited as one of the central Hamsun researchers in Norway. He was a member of the Norwegian Academy of Science and Letters.

His most important releases are Hans E. Kincks livssyn in 1949 about Hans E. Kinck, Konflikt og visjon in 1970 about Knut Hamsun, Fantasiens regnbuebro in 1992 about Henrik Wergeland and Christen Pram: Norges første romanforfatter in 2001 about Christen Pram. He also co-authored volume four of Norges litteraturhistorie, published in 1975. It was written together with Bjarte Birkeland and Per Amdam, and edited by Edvard Beyer.

== Personal life ==
In 2008 Nettum released the autobiography Med litteratur gjennom livet. His preferred standard of writing was Riksmål. He resided in Høvik. He died in January 2010 at Rykkinn, having suffered from a stroke in October 2009.
