= Ellen Marie Forland =

Norwegian businesswoman (1926–2010)

Ellen Marie Forland (21 August 1926 – 22 January 2010) was a Norwegian businessperson.

She hailed from Storebø, took her secondary education in Bergen and studied chemistry in Copenhagen. She married Mikkel Forland in 1953, and they cooperated in the business world until 1973, when her husband decided to be a ship broker while Ellen Marie Forland wanted to be a ship-owner. She started the company E. Forland. In 2007 she was awarded the King's Medal of Merit in gold. She ran the company until her death in 2010, following complications after a heart surgery.
