= Egil Pettersen =

Norwegian philologist

- Born: 4 March 1922; Bergen, Norway
- Died: 27 November 2010 (aged 88)
- Occupation: philologist
- Known for: medieval language

Egil Pettersen (4 March 1922 – 27 November 2010) was a Norwegian philologist.

He was born in Bergen and grew up in Fana. He took the cand.philol. degree in 1950, and was a lecturer at Stockholm University, teacher at Bergen Handelsgymnasium and Bergen Teachers' College. He was hired at the University of Bergen in 1958, and was a professor of North Germanic languages from 1971 to 1989, being a scholar on medieval language. He was a member of the Norwegian Language Council from 1972 to 1991, and of the Norwegian Academy of Science and Letters.
