= Haakon Andreas Olsen =

Norwegian physicist

Haakon Andreas Olsen (18 September 1923 – 22 August 2010) was a Norwegian physicist.

Olsen was born in Tromsø and finished his secondary education in 1944. He enrolled at the Norwegian Institute of Technology, first in architecture, then in technical physics and finally theoretical physics under Harald Wergeland. He graduated with the siv.ing. degree in 1950 and the dr.techn. degree in 1953. His specialty was elementary particle physics.

Olsen was appointed as a docent at the Norwegian Institute of Technology in 1956 and professor in 1962. In 1965 he became a professor at the Norwegian College of Teaching in Trondheim, where he served as rector from 1969 to 1975. He became a professor emeritus at the age of 70, but continued working at the university on a daily basis into his 80s.

The Norwegian College of Teaching in Trondheim became a part of the University of Trondheim, where Olsen chaired the interim board from 1972 to 1975. He was also central in the development of Dragvoll campus. He also chaired the CERN Committee within the science research council NTNF from 1980 to 1993, having been a committee member since 1966. He also edited the Norwegian Physical Society's magazine Fra fysikkens verden.

Olsen was a fellow of the Royal Norwegian Society of Sciences and Letters (praeses 1990 to 1995), fellow of the Central European Academy of Science and Art from 1999, of the Norwegian Academy of Science and Letters, and honorary member of the Norwegian Physical Society from 1992.

Olsen resided at Gløshaugen, near the Institute of Technology. He died in August 2010.
