= Terje G. Simonsen =

Norwegian historian and nonfiction author

Terje Simonsen
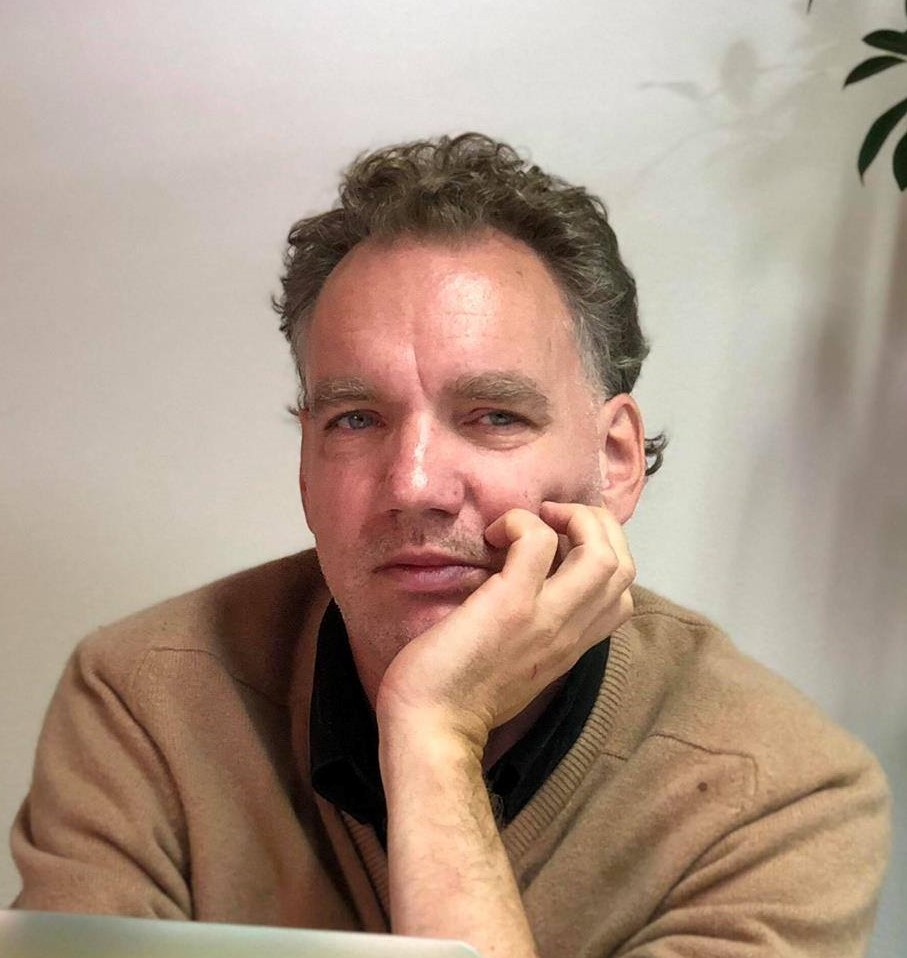
- Terje Simonsen in October 2018
- Born: Terje Gerotti Simonsen; April 23, 1963 (age 63); Kristiansand, Norway
- Education: University of Oslo
- Occupations: Historian, non-fiction writer
- Awards: Parapsychological Association Book Award (2019)

Terje Simonsen (born April 23, 1963) is a Norwegian historian and nonfiction author. He was among the first to predict the arrival of an androgynous pronoun in Norway.

== Early life and education ==
Simonsen was born in Norway on April 23, 1963, in the municipality of Kristiansand and raised in the town of Mandal. He graduated from the University of Oslo in 1993. In 2001, his thesis on the Janus journal and Alf Larsen was published by Solum Forlag as a book JANUS—A Journal and an Era.

== Career ==
In 2003, he wrote an introductory essay to a Norwegian edition of I and Thou by Martin Buber, published by Bokklubben.

In the article “En språklig mutant i anmarsj” (“A Linguistic Mutant Approaching”), published in Morgenbladet, in 2006, Simonsen suggested that gender related changes in culture and society would result in an androgynous pronoun appearing through an evolutionary process resembling natural evolution.

Simonsen's main interest has been esoteric traditions—hermeticism, kabbalah, sufism etc.—and he has also edited and authored writings within this field. Among other things, he instigated the first Norwegian translation and edition of the antique esoteric text Book of Enoch in the series Verdens Hellige Skrifter ("The World’s Holy Scriptures"), where he also wrote an introductory essay.

In 2013, Simonsen authored a book on parapsychology, where he explored various paranormal phenomena in a historical context as well as the evolution of the intellectual foundations of parapsychology. In 2018, an expanded and updated English edition was published by an Italian company Pari Publishing. In November 2019, it received the Parapsychological Association Book Award. A new edition was released in the United Kingdom and United States in 2020 by Watkins Publishing (2020). | In 2013, Simonsen authored a book on parapsychology in Norwegian, where he explored various paranormal phenomena in a historical context as well as the evolution of the intellectual foundations of parapsychology. It was published in English as Our Secret Powers—A Short History of (Nearly) Everything Paranormal (Pari Publishing, 2018) and Czech (Nakladatelství Prah, 2021). In November 2019, the book received the Parapsychological Association Book Award. The following year an upgraded English edition was released under the title A Short History of (Nearly) Everything Paranormal - Our Secret powers: Telepathy, Clairvoyance and Precognition (Watkins Publishing, 2020).

== Publications ==
- Janus—et tidsskrift og en tid [Janus—a Journal and an Era] (in Norwegian). no:Solum Forlag. 2001. ISBN 9788256013128.
- Buber, Martin (2003). "I begynnelsen er forholdet" [In the Beginning is the Relationship]. Jeg og Du [I and Thou] (in Norwegian). Bokklubben. ISBN 9788252537536.
- "Enok—den glemte profet" [Enoch—The Forgotten Prophet]. Enoks bok [Book of Enoch] (in Norwegian). Bokklubben. 2004. ISBN 9788252551778.
- Simonsen, Terje (2013). Våre skjulte evner—telepati, klarsyn og fremsyn [Our Secret Abilities—Telepathy, Clairvoyance and Precognition] (in Norwegian). Pax Forlag. ISBN 978-82-530-3559-8.
- Simonsen, Terje (2018). Our Secret Powers—A Short History of (Nearly) Everything Paranormal. Pari Publishing. ISBN 978-88-95604-33-6.
- Simonsen, Terje (2020). A Short History of (Nearly) Everything Paranormal: Our Secret Powers—Telepathy, Clairvoyance and Precognition. Watkins Publishing. ISBN 978-1786783578.
