= Willi Railo =

Norwegian sports psychologist (1941–2010)

- Born: 22 March 1941; Norway
- Died: 8 July 2010 (aged 69)
- Occupations: Sport psychologist; author; professor
- Known for: Work in performance and sports psychology; authoring *Best når det gjelder*

Willi Sten Railo (22 March 1941 – 8 July 2010) was a Norwegian sport psychologist and professor of performance psychology.

He became known nationally for his 1986 book Best når det gjelder ("Best When it Counts"). Since the 1980s, he worked as a consultant for Swedish football manager Sven-Göran Eriksson, and continued in this position also during the latter's stint as manager for the England national team. He also worked with the Norwegian football club Vålerenga in 2005, when the club won the Norwegian Premier League. In the Norwegian Athletics Association he was a member of the medical committee in 1978 and 1980.
