= Edel Viola Ski =

Norwegian politician

Edel Viola Ski (2 April 1918 – 18 January 2010) was a Norwegian politician for the Labour Party.

She served as a deputy representative to the Parliament of Norway from Buskerud during the term 1961–1965. In total she met during 24 days of parliamentary session.
