= Ole Bjørn Støle =

Norwegian judge (1950-2010)

Ole Bjørn Støle (9 April 1950 – 19 November 2010) was a Norwegian judge.

He was born in Bergen, and graduated as cand.jur. from the University of Bergen in 1976. He worked in the Ministry of Justice and the Police from 1976, was a deputy judge in Kristiansand City Court from 1978, and worked in the Office of the Attorney General of Norway from 1980. He was then a private lawyer from 1985 to 2002, except for the years 1990–1993 when he was a presiding judge in Gulating. He was a Supreme Court Justice from 2002. He was later appointed an ad litem judge at the International Criminal Tribunal for the former Yugoslavia, and was thus granted a leave of absence in Norway. He died in November 2010.
