= Per Johannes Kolsaker =

Norwegian chemist (1931–2010)

Per Johannes Kolsaker (30 September 1931 – 30 June 2010) was a Norwegian chemist.

He was born in Narvik as a son of book printer Johannes Fridtjof Olsen (1898–1975) and Johanne Otelie Trondsen (1896–1988). He, and his family, changed their last name to Kolsaker in 1945. He finished his secondary education in 1950, enrolled at the University of Oslo and graduated with the cand.real. degree in 1958. He also participated in the Independent Norwegian Brigade Group in Germany in 1952.

He became a research assistant in chemistry at the University of Oslo, then a lecturer in 1966 and professor from 1992 to his retirement in 2001. In between he worked for the Norwegian Agency for Development Cooperation in Tanzania from 1982 to 1983, and as an organic chemistry professor at the University of Tromsø from 1983 to 1986.

He was interested in sports, including bridge, chess, golf and orienteering, and chaired the orienteering club IL Tyrving for two periods. He died in June 2010.
