= Terje Hals =

Terje Hals (7 February 1937 – 19 December 2010) was a Norwegian jurist and police chief.

He was born in Drammen, and graduated with the cand.jur. in 1962. He was a police superintendent in Uttrøndelag from 1970 and police inspector from 1971. He served as chief of police in Troms from 1976 to 1986 and in Moss from 1986 to 2001.
