= Adelsten Sivertsen =

Norwegian businessman

Adelsten Gudvan Sivertsen (7 May 1925 – 13 May 2010) was a Norwegian businessperson.

He took the cand.jur. degree at the university in 1951, before working as tax director in Sør-Vågsøy Municipality and deputy judge in Gjerpen Municipality. From 1952 to 1959 he worked as a secretary in the Norwegian Employers' Confederation. From 1959 to 1973 he was a secretary and director of G.C. Rieber & Co, and from 1974 to 1990 he was the CEO of Storli.

Sivertsen chaired the Bergen branch of the Norwegian Shipowners' Association from 1987 to 1988. He was a board member of the bank IS-Banken from 1989 to 1995, and of Hardanger Sunnhordlandske Dampskipsselskap.

He lived in Bergen before retirement, but did in the end reside in Sandvika. Sivertsen died of cancer on 13 May 2010.
