= Kåre Sandvand =

Norwegian illustrator

Kåre Sandvand (25 January 1932 – 3 January 2010) was a Norwegian illustrator.

He grew up in Liknes, in the Sandvand House adjacent to the town hall. The house was erected by Kåre's father Albert Sandvand who was behind several local businesses. For several years, Kåre Sandvand ran his own business from the basement.

He started his working life as a sailor, where he acquired the nicknamed "Sandis", and later started attending the Norwegian National Academy of Craft and Art Industry in Oslo, but was not able to complete that education. He had been hospitalized for tuberculosis at the age of 19. For a time, Sandvand worked as a house painter, and also as a woodcarver in Flekkefjord. He returned to Kvinesdal to produce woodcraft, commencing in 1961 under the name Sandis Kunst. He rotated between some 40 models, changing his output seasonally to meet demands for summer or Christmas items. Dummies carved by Sandvand were duplicated by a pantograph. Several of his products were inspired by Norwegian "souvenirs" such as trolls, hulders and Vikings. Several had humorous and burlesque details, but Sandvand lamented that "the South Norwegians do not prefer this kind of humor. And not woodcarving either. They prefer plaster and everything that's gaudy". Sandvand also produced more neutral items such as door signs.

Nonetheless, he needed to branch out and thus began making posters in the mid-1960s. They were made in plastic and contained aphorisms, jokes, parodies of house rules, safety rules and similar text – accompanied by Sandvand's baroque illustrations. His idol was writer and illustrator Kjell Aukrust. Fædrelandsvennen compared his humour to Bjørn Sand's character Stutum. This meant saying things that crossed the minds of many, but fewer dared to verbalize, "the inner yearnings and essence" of "Ola Nordmann".

Ultimately tiring of repetitive tasks in the workshop, he took a side job as a guard at Øye Smelteverk, where he used stale time to draft new ideas. He also did advertisements and promotional posters. He also illustrated a number of books, both local authors such as Ånen Årli's folkloristic Humor og folkeminne frå det gamle Kvinesdal and books written for a national market such as Men livet skal leves by Lise Valla.

According to the Vest-Agder press, his poster Loven i hjemmet ("Laws of the Domicile") had been produced in a quantity of 50,000 by 1980, and his combined works was displayed "on a couple hundred thousand house and cabin walls throughout Norway". His main market was still Eastern Norway, where various racy tableaus and alcohol jokes were more well-received than in South Norway. Sandvand still shunned "serious art". When he started to illustrate drinking cups, these too became widespread and were exported to Germany, Sweden and Great Britain.

In 1992 he was given the Kvinesdal Municipality Cultural Award. During the visit by Harald and Sonja of Norway to Kvinesdal in 1998, the official gift from the hosting mayor was Kåre Sandvand's portrait of the royal couple.

He was married since 1958, had three children and several grandchildren. In his older age, he moved to his father's origin Sandvann together with his wife. He died in January 2010, shortly before his 78th birthday.
