= 2019 FFAS Senior League =

FFAS Senior League
- Season: 2019
- Champions: Pago Youth
- OFC Champions League: Pago Youth
- Matches: 65
- Goals: 395 (6.08 per match)
- Biggest home win: Pago Youth 27–0 Black Roses (24 August 2019)
- Highest scoring: Pago Youth 27–0 Black Roses (24 August 2019)

The 2019 FFAS Senior League was the 39th edition of the FFAS Senior League, the top football league of American Samoa organized by the Football Federation American Samoa. This season started on 23 August 2019. Most games took place at the 2,000-capacity Pago Park Soccer Stadium.

== Champions ==
Team	Location	Stadium	Capacity
Pago Youth	Pago Pago	Pago Park Soccer Stadium	2,000

== Teams ==
Eleven teams competed in the league.

- Black Roses
- Green Bay
- Ilaoa and To'omata
- Lion Heart
- Pago Youth
- PanSa
- Royal Puma
- Tafuna Jets
- Taputimu Youth
- Utulei Youth
- Vaiala Tongan

== League table ==
The season was ended with one or two games remaining due to the measles outbreak and the remaining matches' irrelevance (Pago Youth had won the championship after Round 14).

Pos	Team	Pld	W	D	L	GF	GA	GD	Pts	Qualification or relegation (Note: Teams are split into two groups (top five and 6th–9th) after each have played 10 matches.)
1	Pago Youth (C)	12	12	0	0	100	12	+88	36	Qualification to 2021 OFC Champions League qualifying stage
2	Utulei Youth	13	8	2	3	45	22	+23	26	
3	Royal Puma	12	8	1	3	57	30	+27	25	
4	Vaiala Tongan	12	5	4	3	34	21	+13	19	
5	Lion Heart	13	6	1	6	26	34	−8	19	
6	Ilaoa and To'omata	12	5	4	3	44	30	+14	19	
7	PanSa	12	5	2	5	23	36	−13	17	
8	Taputimu Youth	12	5	1	6	48	49	−1	16	
9	Black Roses	12	2	0	10	15	91	−76	6	
10	Green Bay (D)	10	1	1	8	3	37	−34	4	Disqualified after two forfeits
11	Tafuna Jets (D)	10	0	0	10	0	33	−33	0	Disqualified after two forfeits

Source: FFAS
(C) Champions; (D) Disqualified

== Results ==
Home \ Away	BR	GB	IT	LH	PG	PS	RP	TJ	TY	UY	VT	BR	GB	IT	LH	PG	PS	RP	TJ	TY	UY	VT
Black Roses			1–9	1–2				3–0	1–14	0–5										3–5		
Green Bay	0–3			0–3				3–0	0–3	0–3												
Ilaoa and To'omata	6–2	0–0			1–8	0–3	5–0				1–1											
Lion Heart			1–1				4–2	3–0	4–3	0–2	0–3										2–5	
Pago Youth	27–0	14–0		5–1				3–0		2–1					4–1							
PanSa	3–0	3–0	3–3	1–3	0–12		0–4															
Royal Puma	0–13	3–0		7–2	3–9			6–0														
Tafuna Jets			0–3			0–3			0–3	0–3	0–3											
Taputimu Youth			1–12		2–0	2–2	5–8				2–7						6–2					
Utulei Youth	1–5		10–3			6–0	2–5		4–2		2–2											
Vaiala Tongan	7–1	5–0			2–5	0–3	1–4			1–1								2–2				

Source: fijifootball.com
Legend: Blue = home team win; Yellow = draw; Red = away team win.
