= 2018 FFAS Senior League =

FFAS Senior League
- Season: 2018
- Champions: Pago Youth
- OFC Champions League: Pago Youth
- Matches: 66
- Goals: 322 (4.88 per match)

The 2018 FFAS Senior League is the 38th edition of the FFAS Senior League, the top football league of American Samoa organized by the Football Federation American Samoa. This season is competed by 12 teams and started on 15 September 2018. The competition was won by Pago Youth.

== Teams ==
These are the teams for the 2018 season.

- Black Roses
- Green Bay
- Ilaoa and To'omata
- Lion Heart
- Pago Youth FC
- Pago Youth B
- PanSa
- Royal Puma
- Tafuna Jets
- Taputimu Youth
- Utulei Youth
- Vaiala Tongan

== Regular season ==
Pos	Team	Pld	W	D	L	GF	GA	GD	Pts	Qualification or relegation
1	Pago Youth FC	11	9	1	1	56	14	+42	28	Qualification to Play-offs
2	Ilaoa and To'omata	11	8	1	2	36	15	+21	25	Qualification to Play-offs
3	Utulei Youth	11	6	5	0	42	14	+28	23	Qualification to Play-offs
4	Taputimu Youth	11	7	1	3	33	20	+13	22	Qualification to Play-offs
5	Vaiala Tongan	11	6	0	5	34	15	+19	18	
6	Royal Puma	11	6	0	5	27	17	+10	18	
7	PanSa	11	4	1	6	22	33	−11	13	
8	Green Bay	11	4	0	7	20	36	−16	12	
9	Pago Youth B	11	3	0	8	19	41	−22	9	
10	Black Roses	11	1	1	9	9	68	−59	4	
11	Tafuna Jets	11	4	1	6	15	23	−8	13	Team disqualified
12	Lion Heart	11	2	1	8	9	26	−17	7	Team disqualified

Updated to match(es) played on 24 November 2018. Source:

== FFAS League Finals ==
=== Semi finals ===
1 December 2018

Pago Youth	4-0	Taputimu Youth
R. Tapui; R. Samuelu; P. Samuelu	Report

Pago Park Soccer Stadium
1 December 2018

Ilaoa and To'omata	0-5	Utulei Youth
	Report	P. Tapusoa; V. Vaieli; A. Kaleopa

Pago Park Soccer Stadium

=== Third place play-off ===
6 December 2018

Ilaoa and To'omata	4-2	Taputimu Youth
	Report

Pago Park Soccer Stadium

=== Final ===
6 December 2018

Pago Youth	3-2	Utulei Youth
P. Samuelu 40'; R. Tapui 48'; L. Amisone Jr. 54'	Report	P. Tapusoa 15'; P. Victor 45'

Pago Park Soccer Stadium

Winner qualifies for 2020 OFC Champions League qualifying stage.
