= American Samoan football clubs in international competitions =

American Samoan soccer clubs have entered association football competitions (OFC Champions League).

The Oceania Club Championship began in 1987, but there was no American Samoan representative during that inaugural season as reigning champions Konica Machine entered in 1999. Currently, American Samoan clubs have only played in the OFC Champions League.

Competition	Who qualifies	Notes
OFC Champions League qualifying stage	FFAS Senior League 1st	

== Full Oceania record for American Samoan clubs ==
Season	Club	Progress	Score	Opponents	Venue(s)
1987	None entered				
1999	Konica Machine	Group stage	N/A	(Solomon Islands) Malaita Eagles, (Australia) South Melbourne	
2001	PanSa	Group stage	N/A	(French Polynesia) A.S. Vénus, (Vanuatu) Tafea, (Samoa) Titavi, (Cook Islands) Tupapa Maraerenga	
2005	PanSa	Preliminary round	w/o	(New Zealand) Auckland City	
2006	None entered				
2007	None entered				
2007–08	None entered				
2008–09	None entered				
2009–10	None entered				
2010–11	None entered				
2011–12	None entered				
2012–13	Pago Youth	Preliminary round	N/A	(Samoa) Kiwi, (Tonga) Lotohaʻapai United, (Cook Islands) Tupapa Maraerenga	
2013–14	Pago Youth	Preliminary round	N/A	(Samoa) Kiwi, (Tonga) Lotohaʻapai United, (Cook Islands) Tupapa Maraerenga	
2014–15	SKBC	Preliminary round	N/A	(Tonga) Lotohaʻapai United, (Samoa) Lupe o le Soaga, (Cook Islands) Puaikura	
2016	Utulei Youth	Preliminary round	N/A	(Samoa) Kiwi, (Cook Islands) Tupapa Maraerenga, (Tonga) Veitongo	
2017	Utulei Youth	Qualifying stage	N/A	(Samoa) Lupe o le Soaga, (Cook Islands) Puaikura, (Tonga) Veitongo	
2018	Pago Youth	Qualifying stage	N/A	(Samoa) Lupe o le Soaga, (Cook Islands) Tupapa Maraerenga, (Tonga) Veitongo	
2019	Pago Youth	Qualifying stage	N/A	(Samoa) Kiwi, (Tonga) Lotohaʻapai United, (Cook Islands) Tupapa Maraerenga	
2020	Pago Youth	Qualifying stage	Withdrew		
2021	Pago Youth	Qualifying stage	Cancelled due to the COVID-19 pandemic		
2023	Ilaoa and To'omata	Qualifying stage	N/A	(Cook Islands) Tupapa Maraerenga, (Tonga) Veitongo	
2024	Vaiala Tonga	Qualifying stage	N/A	(Cook Islands) Tupapa Maraerenga, (Samoa) Vaivase-Tai, (Tonga) Veitongo	
2025	Royal Puma	Qualifying stage	N/A	(Cook Islands) Tupapa Maraerenga, (Samoa) Vaipuna	

=== Performance record and ranking of FFAS Senior League clubs in OFC Champions League ===
Rank	Club	Best Result	99	01	05	12–13	13–14	14–15	16	17	18	19	22	23	24	25
1	PanSa	GS	A	GS	PR	A	A	A	A	A	A	A	A	A	A	A
2	Konica Machine	GS	GS	A	A	A	A	A	A	A	A	A	A	A	A	A
3	Pago Youth	PR x2	A	A	A	PR	PR	A	A	A	QS	QS	A	A	A	A
4	Utulei Youth	PR	A	A	A	A	A	PR	QS	A	A	A	A	A	A	A
5	SKC	PR	A	A	A	A	PR	A	A	A	A	A	A	A	A	A
6	Ilaoa and To'omata	QS	A	A	A	A	A	A	A	A	A	A	A	QS	A	A
7	Vaiala Tonga	QS	A	A	A	A	A	A	A	A	A	A	A	A	QS	A
8	Royal Puma	QS	A	A	A	A	A	A	A	A	A	A	A	A	A	QS

== Performance summary ==
The OFC Champions League (previously known as the Oceania Club Championship) is a seasonal club football competition organized by the Oceania Football Confederation (OFC) since 1987 for the most successful football clubs in Oceania.

As of the end of the 2019 OFC Champions League season, American Samoan clubs have entered the group stage twice and the preliminary round five times leaving no club advancing from these stages. The first representative for American Samoa in the Oceania Club Championship was Konica Machine in 1999 starting from the group stage and did not advance.

=== Early years: 1987–2005 ===
The 1987 competition brought no American Samoan team to play in that tournament. As champions of the ASFA Soccer League in 1999, Konica Machine became the first American Samoan representative in the Oceania Club Championship. They played their first Oceania match against Malaita Eagles resulting in a 14–2 loss. Two days later, they found them eliminated by Australian club South Melbourne in a 10–0 loss.

=== Lack of group stage entrants: 2005–present ===
Since the 2006 Oceania Club Championship, no American Samoan representatives entered for seven consecutive tournaments until Pago Youth qualified for the preliminary round of the 2012–13 OFC Champions League. In the 2017 edition, a new qualifying stage was formed as Utulei Youth was the first American Samoan team to qualify for the qualifying stage, as Pago Youth entered back-to-back qualifying stages. On 17 December 2019, the OFC announced that Pago Youth had withdrawn from the qualifying stage due to concerns about the measles outbreak in the Pacific. The next tournament of the 2021 edition was also unavailable for a qualifying spot with the tournament cancelled due to the COVID-19 pandemic.
