= American Samoa national under-20 football team =

National association football team

American Samoa U20
- Nickname: The Boys from the territory
- Association: Football Federation American Samoa (FFAS)
- Confederation: OFC (Oceania)
- Head coach: (American Samoa) Tunoa Lui
- Captain: Gabriel Taumua
- Most caps: Paul Collins (8)
- Top scorer: Petu Pouli (3)
- FIFA code: ASA
First colors	Second colors

First international
- American Samoa 0–23 Solomon Islands (Apia, Samoa; 15 August 1998)

Biggest win
- None

Biggest defeat
- American Samoa 0–23 Solomon Islands (Apia, Samoa; 15 August 1998)

OFC U-20 Championship
- Appearances: 6 (1998, 2011, 2014, 2016, 2018, 2022)
- Best result: Sixth place (2014)

The American Samoa national under-20 football team is the national U-20 team of American Samoa and is controlled by Football Federation American Samoa.

== History ==
The American Samoa national under-20 football team took part in the OFC U-20 Championship tournament 6 times (1998, 2011, 2014, 2016, 2018 and 2022). The team has never won a game yet. A 1–1 draw against Papua New Guinea in 2014 has been their best result so far. In 2011, the team scored 2 goals, the highest scoring at a tournament so far.

=== OFC ===
The OFC Under 20 Qualifying Tournament is a tournament held once every two years to decide the qualification spots for Oceania Football Confederation (OFC) and representatives at the FIFA U-20 World Cup.

OFC U-19 Championship								Qualification record					
Year	Round	Pld	W	D	L	GF	GA	Pld	W	D	L	GF	GA
(French Polynesia) 1974	Did not enter							No qualification					
(New Zealand) 1978	Did not enter							No qualification					
(Fiji) 1980	Did not enter							No qualification					
(Papua New Guinea) 1982	Did not enter							No qualification					
(Australia) 1985	Did not enter							No qualification					
(New Zealand) 1986	Did not enter							No qualification					
(Fiji) 1988	Did not enter							No qualification					
(Fiji) 1990	Did not enter							No qualification					
(French Polynesia) 1992	Did not enter							No qualification					
(Fiji) 1994	Did not enter							No qualification					
(New Zealand) 1997	Did not enter							No qualification					
(Samoa) 1998	Group stage	3	0	0	3	0	46	No qualification					
(New Caledonia) (Cook Islands) 2001	Did not enter							No qualification					
(Vanuatu) (Fiji) 2002	Did not enter							No qualification					
(Solomon Islands) 2005	Did not enter							No qualification					
(New Zealand) 2007	Did not enter							No qualification					
(French Polynesia) 2008	Did not enter							No qualification					
(New Zealand) 2011	Group stage	3	0	0	3	2	17	No qualification					
(Fiji) 2013	Did not enter							No qualification					
(Fiji) 2014	Sixth place	5	0	1	4	1	23	No qualification					
(Tonga) (Vanuatu) 2016	Did not qualify							3	0	1	2	1	11
(Cook Islands) (French Polynesia) 2018	Did not qualify							3	0	0	3	1	7
(French Polynesia) 2022	Group stage	3	0	0	3	0	19	No qualification					
(Vanuatu) (Samoa) 2024	Did not qualify							3	0	0	0	5	11
(Cook Islands) (Samoa) 2026	Did not enter							Did not enter					
Total	Group stage	14	0	1	13	3	105	9	0	1	8	7	29

== Current squad ==
The following players were called up for the 2022 OFC U-19 Championship from 7 to 20 September 2022. Names in italics denote players who have been capped for the Senior team.

Caps and goals as of 14 September 2022 before the game against the Cook Islands.

No.	Pos.	Player	Date of birth (age)	Caps	Goals	Club
1	GK	Penieli Atu	5 September 2005 (age 21)	3	0	(Football Federation American Samoa) PanSa East
23	GK	Rex Iose		0	0	
2	DF	Poasa Collins	12 January 2004 (age 22)	3	0	(Football Federation American Samoa) Pago Youth
3	DF	Afa Sione	22 June 2003 (age 23)	3	0	(Football Federation American Samoa) Pago Youth
4	DF	Pama Fetuao	3 April 2004 (age 22)	3	0	(Football Federation American Samoa) PanSa East
5	DF	Viliami Topui		2	0	(Football Federation American Samoa) Vaiala Tongan
16	DF	Ioane Palepua	22 April 2003 (age 23)	2	0	(Football Federation American Samoa) PanSa East
17	DF	Zion Moala	8 March 2004 (age 22)	1	0	(Football Federation American Samoa) Taputimu Youth
19	DF	Sekone Faaoga	17 December 2003 (age 22)	2	0	(Football Federation American Samoa) Tafuna Jets
6	MF	Nofomuli Uitalia	1 November 2004 (age 21)	3	0	(Football Federation American Samoa) Vaiala Tongan
7	MF	William Hollister		1	0	(Football Federation American Samoa) Lion Heart
11	MF	Pago Isu	13 November 2005 (age 20)	2	0	(Football Federation American Samoa) Black Roses
12	MF	Jimmy Dong	24 September 2005 (age 21)	1	0	(Football Federation American Samoa) Black Roses
13	MF	Maselino Feula	23 December 2005 (age 20)	3	0	(Football Federation American Samoa) Royal Puma
14	MF	Tamati Lilo	3 November 2003 (age 22)	2	0	(Football Federation American Samoa) Ilaoa and To'omata
15	MF	Nuumotu Sasala	21 February 2004 (age 22)	2	0	(Football Federation American Samoa) Green Bay
18	MF	Leon Aporosa		3	0	
20	MF	Chris Seleni	24 December 2004 (age 21)	0	0	(Football Federation American Samoa) Tafuna Jets
21	MF	Fuahala Malani	17 December 2005 (age 20)	0	0	(Football Federation American Samoa) Vaiala Tongan
8	FW	Petu Pouli	18 December 2005 (age 20)	3	0	(Football Federation American Samoa) Vaiala Tongan
9	FW	Kelvin Seong	5 February 2004 (age 22)	3	0	(Football Federation American Samoa) Pago Youth
10	FW	Johnica Collins	12 January 2006 (age 20)	3	0	(Football Federation American Samoa) Pago Youth

=== Pre-Squad ===
No.	Pos.	Player	Date of birth (age)	Caps	Goals	Club
23	GK	David Tua	22 September 2006 (age 20)	0	0	(Football Federation American Samoa) Vaiala Tongan
5	DF	Mark Nelisi	15 February 2005 (age 21)	0	0	(Football Federation American Samoa) Utulei Youth
7	MF	Rock Kaleopa	6 September 2003 (age 23)	0	0	(Football Federation American Samoa) Utulei Youth
18	MF	Talimalolo Taliauli	13 December 2005 (age 20)	0	0	(Football Federation American Samoa) Vaiala Tongan

== See also ==
- American Samoa national football team
- American Samoa national under-23 football team
- American Samoa national under-17 football team
- American Samoa women's national football team
