= 2017 FFAS Senior League =

FFAS Senior League
- Season: 2017
- Champions: Pago Youth
- Matches: 65

The 2017 FFAS Senior League is the 37th edition of the FFAS Senior League, the top league of the Football Federation American Samoa. This season was competed by 12 teams and started on 2 September 2017.

The league was won by Pago Youth.

== Teams ==
These are the teams for the 2017 season.

- Black Roses
- Green Bay
- Ilaoa and To'omata
- Lion Heart
- Pago Youth
- PanSa East
- Royal Puma
- Tafuna Jets
- Taputimu Youth
- Utulei Youth
- Vaiala Tongan
- Vaiala Tongan B

== Standings ==
Reported final table
Pos	Team	Pld	W	D	L	GF	GA	GD	Pts	Qualification
1	Pago Youth	11	10	1	0	0	0	0	31	
2	Lion Heart	11	8	2	1	0	0	0	26	
3	Royal Puma	11	8	1	2	0	0	0	25	
4	Vaiala Tongan	11	6	2	3	0	0	0	20	
5	Green Bay	11	6	2	3	0	0	0	20	
6	Black Roses	11	5	1	5	0	0	0	16	
7	PanSa East	11	4	2	5	0	0	0	14	
8	Utulei Youth	11	3	1	7	0	0	0	10	
9	Taputimu Youth	11	3	0	8	0	0	0	9	
10	Vaiala Tongan B	11	1	0	10	0	0	0	3	
–	Ilaoa and To'omata	10	4	0	6	0	0	0	12	Disqualified (Note: Ilaoa & To'omata and Tafuna Jets disqualified after two forfeits.)
–	Tafuna Jets	10	1	0	9	0	0	0	3	Disqualified

Rules for classification: 1) points; 2) goal difference; 3) number of goals scored.
