= 2022 OFC U-19 Championship squads =

The 2022 OFC U-19 Championship is an international football tournament being held in Tahiti from 7 to 24 September 2022 for under 19 players. The eleven national teams involved in the tournament were required to register a squad of up to 26 players, including two goalkeepers. Only players in these squads are eligible to take part in the tournament. The two finalists of the tournament qualify for the 2023 FIFA U-20 World Cup.

The position listed for each player is per the official squad list published by the OFC. The age listed for each player is on 7 September 2022, the first day of the tournament. The numbers of caps and goals listed for each player do not include any matches played after the start of tournament. The nationality for each club reflects the national association (not the league) to which the club is affiliated. A flag is included for coaches that are of a different nationality than their own national team.

== Group A ==
=== American Samoa ===
- Coach: Ruben Luvu

No.	Pos.	Player	Date of birth (age)	Club
1	GK	Penieli Atu	5 September 2005 (aged 17)	(Football Federation American Samoa) PanSa East
2	DF	Poasa Collins	12 January 2004 (aged 18)	(Football Federation American Samoa) Pago Youth
3	DF	Afa Sione	22 June 2003 (aged 19)	(Football Federation American Samoa) Pago Youth
4	DF	Pama Fetuao	3 April 2004 (aged 18)	(Football Federation American Samoa) PanSa East
5	DF	Mark Nelisi	15 February 2005 (aged 17)	(Football Federation American Samoa) Utulei Youth
6	MF	Nofomuli Uitalia	1 November 2004 (aged 17)	(Football Federation American Samoa) Vaiala Tongan
7	MF	Rock Kaleopa	6 September 2003 (aged 19)	(Football Federation American Samoa) Utulei Youth
8	FW	Petu Pouli	18 December 2005 (aged 16)	(Football Federation American Samoa) Vaiala Tongan
9	FW	Kelvin Seong	5 February 2004 (aged 18)	(Football Federation American Samoa) Pago Youth
10	FW	Johnica Collins	12 January 2006 (aged 16)	(Football Federation American Samoa) Pago Youth
11	MF	Pago Isu	13 November 2005 (aged 16)	(Football Federation American Samoa) Black Roses
12	MF	Jimmy Dong	24 September 2005 (aged 16)	(Football Federation American Samoa) Black Roses
13	MF	Maselino Feula	23 December 2005 (aged 16)	(Football Federation American Samoa) Royal Puma
14	MF	Tamati Lilo	3 November 2003 (aged 18)	(Football Federation American Samoa) Ilaoa and To'omata
15	MF	Nuumotu Sasala	21 February 2004 (aged 18)	(Football Federation American Samoa) Green Bay
16	DF	Ioane Palepua	22 April 2003 (aged 19)	(Football Federation American Samoa) PanSa East
17	DF	Zion Moala	8 March 2004 (aged 18)	(Football Federation American Samoa) Taputimu Youth
18	MF	Talimalolo Taliauli	13 December 2005 (aged 16)	(Football Federation American Samoa) Vaiala Tongan
19	DF	Sekone Faaoga	17 December 2003 (aged 18)	(Football Federation American Samoa) Tafuna Jets
20	MF	Chris Seleni	24 February 2004 (aged 18)	(Football Federation American Samoa) Tafuna Jets
21	DF	Fusi Malani	17 December 2005 (aged 16)	(Football Federation American Samoa) Vaiala Tongan
22	GK	David Tua	22 September 2006 (aged 15)	(Football Federation American Samoa) Vaiala Tongan
23	GK	Rex Iose	1 January 2005 (aged 17)	(Football Federation American Samoa) Lion Heart

=== Cook Islands ===
- Coach: Tahiri Elikana

No.	Pos.	Player	Date of birth (age)	Club
1	GK	Ngereine Maro	20 March 2005 (age 21)	(New Zealand Football) Western Suburbs
2	MF	Oscar Wichman	1 July 2005 (age 21)	(Cook Islands Football Association) Avatiu
3	DF	Temarii Jubilee	14 May 2005 (age 21)	(Cook Islands Football Association) Titikaveka
4	MF	Brook Kurariki	17 August 2003 (age 23)	(Cook Islands Football Association) Nikao Sokattak
5	MF	Shane Tuteru	29 June 2006 (age 20)	(Cook Islands Football Association) Tupapa Maraerenga
6	MF	Ngametua Tuakana	28 February 2005 (age 21)	(Cook Islands Football Association) Tupapa Maraerenga
7	MF	Silas Trego	26 May 2003 (age 23)	(Cook Islands Football Association) Nikao Sokattak
8	DF	Nuku Mokoroa	15 May 2004 (age 22)	(Cook Islands Football Association) Nikao Sokattak
9	FW	Dalziel Beal	26 April 2005 (age 21)	(Cook Islands Football Association) Matavera Ngatangiia
10	FW	Marcus Gibbens	19 November 2003 (age 22)	(Cook Islands Football Association) Matavera Ngatangiia
11	DF	Jean Tua	10 December 2003 (age 22)	(Cook Islands Football Association) Matavera Ngatangiia
12	DF	Ariki Kiriau	11 November 2005 (age 20)	(Cook Islands Football Association) Avatiu
13	DF	Davida David	18 October 2003 (age 22)	(Cook Islands Football Association) Puaikura
14	DF	Nia Remuera	1 May 2005 (age 21)	(Cook Islands Football Association) Nikao Sokattak
15	FW	Tione Nand	1 January 2006 (age 20)	(Cook Islands Football Association) Avatiu
16	MF	Hubert Tou	15 May 2003 (age 23)	(Cook Islands Football Association) Nikao Sokattak
17	MF	Creedence Kiriwi	21 September 2003 (age 23)	(New Zealand Football) Central United
18	DF	Jordan Matapo	12 July 2006 (age 20)	(Cook Islands Football Association) Nikao Sokattak
19	DF	Dwayne Matapo	12 July 2006 (age 20)	(Cook Islands Football Association) Nikao Sokattak
20	GK	Apiti Arere	2 March 2005 (age 21)	(Cook Islands Football Association) Vaipae
21	MF	Temaru Tutai	12 December 2005 (age 20)	(Cook Islands Football Association) Avatiu
22	FW	Taonga Poila	18 March 2006 (age 20)	(Cook Islands Football Association) Tupapa Maraerenga
23	GK	Moana Rakei	18 July 2003 (age 23)	(Cook Islands Football Association) Nikao Sokattak
24	MF	Christopher Pita	11 November 2005 (age 20)	(Cook Islands Football Association) Avatiu
25	MF	Robert Conesa	12 November 2005 (age 20)	(Cook Islands Football Association) Nikao Sokattak
26	MF	Kadecz Tatuava	21 August 2003 (age 23)	(Cook Islands Football Association) Tupapa Maraerenga

=== New Zealand ===
The 26 man preliminary squad was announced by OFC on 27 August 2022. New Zealand Football announced their final 23 man squad on 1 September 2022.

- Coach: (England) Darren Bazeley

No.	Pos.	Player	Date of birth (age)	Club
1	GK	Joe Knowles	2 November 2004 (aged 17)	(New Zealand Football) Eastern Suburbs
2	DF	Jackson Jarvie	1 May 2003 (aged 19)	(New Zealand Football) Eastern Suburbs
3	DF	Adam Supyk	21 February 2004 (aged 18)	(New Zealand Football) Wellington Phoenix
4	MF	Isaac Hughes	25 March 2004 (aged 18)	(New Zealand Football) Wellington Phoenix
5	DF	Finn Surman (captain)	23 September 2003 (aged 18)	(New Zealand Football) Wellington Phoenix
6	MF	Fin Conchie	10 August 2003 (aged 19)	(New Zealand Football) Wellington Phoenix
7	FW	Noah Karunaratne	27 June 2003 (aged 19)	(New Zealand Football) Wellington Phoenix
8	MF	Jackson Manuel	24 February 2003 (aged 19)	(New Zealand Football) Wellington Phoenix
9	FW	Oliver Colloty	4 July 2003 (aged 19)	(New Zealand Football) Melville United
10	FW	Jay Herdman	14 August 2004 (aged 18)	(Canadian Soccer Association) Vancouver Whitecaps FC 2
11	FW	Oliver Fay	16 July 2003 (aged 19)	(New Zealand Football) Auckland United
12	GK	Oscar Mason	16 August 2004 (aged 18)	(New Zealand Football) Napier City Rovers
13	DF	Lukas Kelly-Heald	18 March 2005 (aged 17)	(New Zealand Football) Wellington Phoenix
14	DF	Marco Lorenz	17 October 2003 (aged 18)	(New Zealand Football) Wellington Phoenix
15	DF	Aaryan Raj	4 May 2003 (aged 19)	(New Zealand Football) Eastern Suburbs
16	MF	Dan McKay	27 November 2003 (aged 18)	(New Zealand Football) Wellington Phoenix
17	MF	Sebastian Barton-Ginger	8 December 2004 (aged 17)	(New Zealand Football) Wellington Phoenix
18	MF	Charlie Beale	3 September 2003 (aged 19)	(New Zealand Football) Wellington Phoenix
19	FW	Kian Donkers	12 September 2004 (aged 17)	(New Zealand Football) Cashmere Technical
20	MF	Wilson Souphanthavong	25 March 2004 (aged 18)	(New Zealand Football) Miramar Rangers
21	MF	Theo Ettema	14 July 2004 (aged 18)	(New Zealand Football) Wellington Olympic
22	DF	Everton O'Leary	4 October 2004 (aged 17)	(New Zealand Football) Birkenhead United
23	GK	Henry Gray	29 March 2005 (aged 17)	(New Zealand Football) Wellington Phoenix
24	FW	Josh Rudland	14 October 2003 (aged 18)	(New Zealand Football) Wellington Phoenix
25	FW	Chase Taylor	12 January 2004 (aged 18)	(New Zealand Football) Birkenhead United
26	GK	Regan Diver	6 July 2003 (aged 19)	(New Zealand Football) Northern Rovers

=== Solomon Islands ===
- Coach: Jerry Allen

No.	Pos.	Player	Date of birth (age)	Club
1	GK	Junior Petua	30 December 2003 (age 22)	(Solomon Islands Football Federation) Honiara City
2	DF	Joel Luiramo	13 May 2003 (age 23)	(Solomon Islands Football Federation) Central Coast
3	DF	Arthur Reginald	19 March 2004 (age 22)	(Solomon Islands Football Federation) Laugu United
4	DF	Jayson Kofela	17 June 2004 (age 22)	(Solomon Islands Football Federation) Isabel United
5	DF	Wilfred Mani	9 June 2003 (age 23)	(Solomon Islands Football Federation) Southern United
6	MF	Cyral Enotarau	2 December 2003 (age 22)	(Solomon Islands Football Federation) Waneagu United
7	MF	Alden Suri	4 April 2004 (age 22)	(New Zealand Football) Petone
8	MF	Dolson Orisimae	29 December 2003 (age 22)	(Solomon Islands Football Federation) Waneagu United
9	FW	Rocky Junior	26 October 2003 (age 22)	(Solomon Islands Football Federation) Honiara City
10	FW	Barrie Limoki	2 March 2004 (age 22)	(Fiji Football Association) Nadi
11	MF	Francis Paul	5 September 2004 (age 22)	(Solomon Islands Football Federation) Waneagu United
12	GK	Ron Sale	7 November 2003 (age 22)	(Solomon Islands Football Federation) Isabel United
13	DF	Zimri Kini	26 July 2004 (age 22)	(Solomon Islands Football Federation) Southern United
14	DF	Edward Aulanga	17 September 2003 (age 23)	(Solomon Islands Football Federation) Honiara City
15	DF	Vincent Liuga	26 January 2003 (age 23)	(Solomon Islands Football Federation) Isabel United
16	DF	Solomon Sale	3 August 2004 (age 22)	(Solomon Islands Football Federation) Honiara City
17	DF	Erick Bekaka	20 December 2003 (age 22)	(Solomon Islands Football Federation) Kossa
18	MF	Prince Dansale	29 May 2003 (age 23)	(Solomon Islands Football Federation) Waneagu United
19	MF	Gregly Talo	28 August 2004 (age 22)	(Solomon Islands Football Federation) Real Kakamora
20	FW	Selwyn Hou	2 December 2003 (age 22)	(Solomon Islands Football Federation) Honiara City
21	GK	John Sanga	22 March 2003 (age 23)	(Solomon Islands Football Federation) Marist
22	DF	Billy Afi	12 June 2005 (age 21)	(Solomon Islands Football Federation) Henderson Eels
23	MF	Alfie Aunga	23 September 2003 (age 23)	(Solomon Islands Football Federation) Marist
24	DF	James Fefera	13 August 2004 (age 22)	(Solomon Islands Football Federation) Isabel United

== Group B ==
=== Fiji ===
- Coach: Ronil Lal

No.	Pos.	Player	Date of birth (age)	Club
1	GK	Aydin Mustahib	28 May 2004 (age 22)	(New Zealand Football) Auckland United
2	MF	Peter Ravai	25 March 2003 (age 23)	(The Football Association) Maidstone United
3	MF	Sailasa Ratu	3 February 2004 (age 22)	(Fiji Football Association) Tavua
4	MF	Abdullah Aiyas	26 September 2003 (age 23)	(Football Australia) Bonnyrigg White Eagles
5	MF	Lachlan Lal	29 November 2004 (age 21)	(Football Australia) Manly United
6	MF	Mustafa Mohammed	2 April 2005 (age 21)	(Football Australia) Brisbane Roar FC U23
7	MF	Melvin Mani	2 June 2003 (age 23)	(Fiji Football Association) Navua
8	MF	Caleb Aaron Prasad	3 March 2003 (age 23)	(New Zealand Football) Manukau United
9	FW	Marcus Lal	24 June 2003 (age 23)	(Football Australia) Manly United
10	MF	Nabil Begg	17 March 2004 (age 22)	(Fiji Football Association) Ba
11	MF	Oliver McFadyan	20 August 2003 (age 23)	(The Football Association) Stockport County Youth
12	MF	Clarence Hussain	4 July 2003 (age 23)	(Fiji Football Association) Nasinu
13	DF	Pawan Singh	16 October 2003 (age 22)	(Fiji Football Association) Labasa
14	MF	Gulam Razool	29 January 2004 (age 22)	(Fiji Football Association) Lautoka
15	FW	Zoheb Rahim	13 January 2003 (age 23)	(Fiji Football Association) Nadroga
16	DF	Geary Kubu	28 April 2003 (age 23)	(Fiji Football Association) Nasinu
17	DF	Mohammed Fataul	10 August 2003 (age 23)	(Fiji Football Association) Seaqaqa
18	DF	Samuela Navoce	22 July 2003 (age 23)	(Fiji Football Association) Suva
19	FW	Junior Dekedeke	25 March 2003 (age 23)	(Fiji Football Association) Lautoka
20	GK	Joji Vuakaca	24 March 2003 (age 23)	(Fiji Football Association) Labasa
21	FW	Sterling Vasconcellos	19 April 2005 (age 21)	(Fiji Football Association) Lautoka
22	GK	Isikeli Sevenaia	11 January 2003 (age 23)	(Fiji Football Association) Nadroga
23	DF	Peniasi Rotidara	10 July 2004 (age 22)	(Fiji Football Association) Suva
24	DF	Sailosi Tawake	12 November 2004 (age 21)	(Fiji Football Association) Labasa
25	FW	Faazil Faizul Ali	8 May 2003 (age 23)	(Fiji Football Association) Ba

=== Papua New Guinea ===
- Coach: Anthony Pakakota

No.	Pos.	Player	Date of birth (age)	Club
1	GK	Jeezreel Apising	10 June 2004 (age 22)	(Papua New Guinea Football Association) PNG FA
2	DF	Issac Basa	27 October 2003 (age 22)	(Papua New Guinea Football Association) PNG FA
3	DF	Lee-Navu Faunt	4 May 2003 (age 23)	(Football Australia) Redlands United
4	MF	Michael Gambu	13 March 2003 (age 23)	(Papua New Guinea Football Association) Northern Youth
5	DF	Kuman Gene	25 May 2004 (age 22)	(Papua New Guinea Football Association) PNG FA
6	MF	Jese Grese	16 September 2003 (age 23)	(Papua New Guinea Football Association) PNG FA
7	DF	Charles Hayes	18 June 2004 (age 22)	(Papua New Guinea Football Association) PNG FA
8	FW	Cyril Kadiko	29 August 2004 (age 22)	(Papua New Guinea Football Association) PNG FA
9	FW	Jeremiah Kamake	31 July 2003 (age 23)	(Papua New Guinea Football Association) Northern Youth
10	DF	Nigel Kiaka	21 June 2004 (age 22)	(Papua New Guinea Football Association) Northern Youth
11	DF	Randell Kuapaitam	18 June 2003 (age 23)	(Papua New Guinea Football Association) PNG FA
12	DF	Balthasar Mari	20 January 2003 (age 23)	(Papua New Guinea Football Association) PNG FA
13	FW	Jahnnel Meio	10 December 2004 (age 21)	(Papua New Guinea Football Association) PNG FA
14	DF	Nick Naa'ru	29 April 2004 (age 22)	(Papua New Guinea Football Association) PNG FA
15	FW	Rex Naime	23 October 2003 (age 22)	(Papua New Guinea Football Association) Hekari United
16	FW	Vianney Noneng	15 January 2004 (age 22)	(Papua New Guinea Football Association) PNG FA
17	DF	Felix Suaimbau	25 June 2003 (age 23)	(Papua New Guinea Football Association) PNG FA
18	DF	Jarvin Sudii	28 August 2004 (age 22)	(Papua New Guinea Football Association) PNG FA
19	DF	Alfred Tinge	23 November 2003 (age 22)	(Papua New Guinea Football Association) Northern Youth
20	GK	Christian Jimmy	16 August 2003 (age 23)	(Papua New Guinea Football Association) PNG FA
21	DF	Maroa Tom	3 March 2003 (age 23)	(Papua New Guinea Football Association) Southern Youth
22	MF	Joshua Urro	16 April 2003 (age 23)	(Papua New Guinea Football Association) Morobe Wawens
23	MF	Jason Wadunah	25 January 2003 (age 23)	(Papua New Guinea Football Association) Tusbab Stallions
24	DF	Claus Wall	8 July 2004 (age 22)	(Papua New Guinea Football Association) PNG FA
25	FW	Jezshril Warren	6 March 2004 (age 22)	(Papua New Guinea Football Association) PNG FA
26	MF	Hamray Wayne	25 July 2004 (age 22)	(Papua New Guinea Football Association) PNG FA

=== Tahiti ===
- Coach: Bruno Tehaamoana

No.	Pos.	Player	Date of birth (age)	Club
1	GK	Keahinui Heinis	3 August 2005 (age 21)	(Tahitian Football Federation) Tefana
2	DF	Josh Hunter	13 October 2005 (age 20)	(Tahitian Football Federation) Tefana
3	MF	Heihau Hanere	5 July 2003 (age 23)	(Tahitian Football Federation) Tiare Anani
4	DF	Haumau Tanetoa	13 November 2004 (age 21)	(Tahitian Football Federation) Pirae
5	DF	Hiurai Vernaudon	18 January 2004 (age 22)	(Tahitian Football Federation) Central Sport
6	MF	Raihiti Douepere	10 February 2003 (age 23)	(Tahitian Football Federation) Temanava
7	FW	Kahutia Pautu	22 May 2003 (age 23)	(Tahitian Football Federation) Tefana
8	MF	Tekaki Sangue	17 June 2003 (age 23)	(Tahitian Football Federation) Mataiea
9	FW	Hauroa Morgant	21 May 2004 (age 22)	(Tahitian Football Federation) Tefana
10	FW	Manuarii Shan	23 February 2004 (age 22)	(Tahitian Football Federation) Vénus
11	FW	Mathis Boube	29 January 2004 (age 22)	(Tahitian Football Federation) Temanava
12	DF	Nehemia Teriitahi	20 January 2004 (age 22)	(Tahitian Football Federation) Pirae
13	MF	Kamalani Bennett	25 December 2005 (age 20)	(Tahitian Football Federation) Tefana
14	MF	Heinoa Aurentz	30 August 2005 (age 21)	(Tahitian Football Federation) Taiarapu
15	MF	Puni Temarii	25 November 2003 (age 22)	(Tahitian Football Federation) Arue
16	GK	Hotuarii Tavaearii	10 April 2003 (age 23)	(Tahitian Football Federation) Taiarapu
17	DF	Tekaviu Teihotu	7 June 2004 (age 22)	(Tahitian Football Federation) Temanava
18	DF	Tevaitini Teumere	2 April 2003 (age 23)	(Tahitian Football Federation) Vénus
19	MF	Jason Malakai	18 February 2005 (age 21)	(Tahitian Football Federation) Vénus
20	MF	Matai Papaura	6 April 2005 (age 21)	(Tahitian Football Federation) Pueu
21	DF	Herehau Bennett	26 March 2005 (age 21)	(Tahitian Football Federation) Tefana
22	GK	Anapa Debruyne	22 September 2003 (age 23)	(Tahitian Football Federation) Vénus
23	DF	Manuarii Vahirua	30 January 2003 (age 23)	(Tahitian Football Federation) Central Sport
24	MF	Mana Teniau	15 January 2005 (age 21)	(Tahitian Football Federation) Vénus
25	DF	Heimana Belin	24 March 2003 (age 23)	(Tahitian Football Federation) Tefana
26	MF	Clement Tehahe	18 June 2003 (age 23)	(Tahitian Football Federation) Taiarapu

=== Tonga ===
- Coach: Timote Moleni

No.	Pos.	Player	Date of birth (age)	Club
1	GK	Nimilote Moala	18 July 2003 (age 23)	(Tonga Football Association) Foloha Marist Kauvai
2	DF	Unaloto Aho	6 April 2004 (age 22)	(Tonga Football Association) Nukuhetulu
3	DF	Macklean Veatupu	11 March 2004 (age 22)	(Tonga Football Association) Nukuhetulu
4	DF	Feleti Lonitenisi	2 April 2004 (age 22)	(Tonga Football Association) Utui
5	DF	Ulukaulupe Akolo	16 September 2003 (age 23)	(Tonga Football Association) Havelu
6	MF	Christopher Kefu	11 February 2003 (age 23)	(Tonga Football Association) Veitongo
7	MF	Sosefo Mailangi	9 November 2003 (age 22)	(Tonga Football Association) Havelu
8	DF	Utu'one Lea'aetoa	16 February 2005 (age 21)	(Tonga Football Association) Veitongo
9	FW	Kulisitofa Kite	17 January 2003 (age 23)	(Tonga Football Association) Lavengatonga
10	FW	Amoni Fifita	26 June 2004 (age 22)	(Tonga Football Association) Makave
11	MF	Lisiate Feke	25 March 2004 (age 22)	(Tonga Football Association) Longolongo
12	FW	Sione Veamatahau	12 April 2003 (age 23)	(Tonga Football Association) Navutoka
13	DF	Napoleone Hala	10 May 2004 (age 22)	(Tonga Football Association) Feletoa
14	MF	Michael Fotu	23 August 2004 (age 22)	(Tonga Football Association) Nukuhetulu
15	MF	Herick Funaki	7 August 2003 (age 23)	(Tonga Football Association) Longolongo
16	GK	Manamo'ui Halahingano	5 November 2003 (age 22)	(Tonga Football Association) Havelu
17	DF	Penisimani Latu	11 December 2005 (age 20)	(Tonga Football Association) Nukuhetulu
18	MF	Kotoni Talia'uli	2 November 2004 (age 21)	(Tonga Football Association) Fasi mo e Afi
19	DF	Fakaofo Tonga	29 October 2004 (age 21)	(Tonga Football Association) Navutoka
20	MF	Sosefo Tolu	25 February 2004 (age 22)	(Tonga Football Association) Longoteme
21	FW	Kipione Fetuiaki	1 April 2003 (age 23)	(Tonga Football Association) Utui
22	GK	Viliame Li	11 January 2004 (age 22)	(Tonga Football Association) Navutoka
23	DF	Motu Pasikala	1 September 2005 (age 21)	(Tonga Football Association) Toloa Old Boys
24	MF	Petelo Naniseni	20 December 2003 (age 22)	(Tonga Football Association) Navutoka
25	FW	Tomasi Teu	11 May 2004 (age 22)	(Tonga Football Association) Foloha Marist Kauvai

== Group C ==
=== New Caledonia ===
- Coach: Pierre Wajoka

No.	Pos.	Player	Date of birth (age)	Club
1	GK	Macane Honakoko	6 May 2003 (age 23)	(New Caledonian Football Federation) Wetr
2	DF	Neyll Passa	6 April 2003 (age 23)	(New Caledonian Football Federation) Wetr
3	DF	Sake Forest	13 August 2003 (age 23)	(New Caledonian Football Federation) Tiga Sport
4	DF	Yael Wjieme	21 January 2004 (age 22)	(New Caledonian Football Federation) Lössi
5	DF	Liorane Waouka	3 November 2003 (age 22)	(New Caledonian Football Federation) Qanono
6	MF	Huna Huna	26 February 2003 (age 23)	(New Caledonian Football Federation) Gaïtcha
7	MF	Yannick Ipunesso	17 February 2004 (age 22)	(New Caledonian Football Federation) Wetr
8	MF	Hector Waheo	17 February 2004 (age 22)	(New Caledonian Football Federation) Mont-Dore
9	FW	Melvin Chenot	15 October 2004 (age 21)	(New Caledonian Football Federation) Horizon Patho
10	FW	Robert Wathiepel	9 June 2003 (age 23)	(New Caledonian Football Federation) Ne Drehu
11	MF	Jymael Upa	15 December 2004 (age 21)	(New Caledonian Football Federation) Lössi
12	FW	Gilbert Kugogne	4 May 2004 (age 22)	(New Caledonian Football Federation) Magenta
13	DF	Tyeou Boano	17 February 2004 (age 22)	(New Caledonian Football Federation) Mont-Dore
14	FW	Luc Boano	17 January 2005 (age 21)	(New Caledonian Football Federation) Saint-Louis
15	MF	Djibril Tufele	25 January 2003 (age 23)	(New Caledonian Football Federation) Lössi
16	GK	Emmanuel Wahnapo	23 May 2005 (age 21)	(New Caledonian Football Federation) Wetr
17	FW	Wesley Samadi	5 December 2003 (age 22)	(New Caledonian Football Federation) Magenta
18	FW	Emmanuel Kayara	26 January 2004 (age 22)	(New Caledonian Football Federation) Hienghène Sport
19	MF	Willy Read	11 January 2003 (age 23)	(New Caledonian Football Federation) Lössi
20	MF	Ritchie Ausu	16 June 2003 (age 23)	(New Caledonian Football Federation) Gaïtcha
21	DF	Bernard Katrawa	27 May 2003 (age 23)	(New Caledonian Football Federation) Lössi
22	MF	Saihnyie Kacoco	20 February 2004 (age 22)	(New Caledonian Football Federation) Lössi
23	GK	Wareen Hlupa	16 April 2004 (age 22)	(New Caledonian Football Federation) Lössi
24	DF	Kryss Pougin	21 July 2004 (age 22)	(New Caledonian Football Federation) Horizon Patho
25	MF	Paul Jone	28 April 2003 (age 23)	(New Caledonian Football Federation) Mont-Dore
26	MF	Claude Forest	9 September 2003 (age 23)	(New Caledonian Football Federation) Ne Drehu

=== Samoa ===
- Coach: (New Zealand) Matt Calcott

No.	Pos.	Player	Date of birth (age)	Club
1	GK	Joel Bartley	13 April 2005 (age 21)	(Football Australia) Sydney United
2	DF	Elijah Uelese	10 March 2003 (age 23)	(Football Australia) Mt Druitt Town Rangers
3	DF	Elijah Fiaalii	2 December 2003 (age 22)	(Football Australia) Dandenong City
4	DF	Taine Wilson	8 November 2004 (age 21)	(New Zealand Football) Western Springs
5	DF	Fetuao Belcher	1 May 2003 (age 23)	(New Zealand Football) Napier City Rovers
6	MF	Laauli Blakelock	29 January 2003 (age 23)	(Football Federation Samoa) Vailima Kiwi
7	FW	Victor Leddy	21 December 2003 (age 22)	(Football Australia) Ipswich Knights
8	FW	Jesse Vine	23 January 2003 (age 23)	(Football Australia) Kemps Creek United
9	FW	Greg Siamoa	21 August 2003 (age 23)	(Football Australia) Western United
10	MF	Jarvis Filimalae	20 April 2003 (age 23)	(Football Federation Samoa) Lupe o le Soaga
11	FW	Juan Gobbi	17 November 2005 (age 20)	(Football Australia) Mounties Wanderers
12	DF	Rushonn Tafunai	3 March 2006 (age 20)	(Football Australia) Melbourne Victory
13	FW	Luke Salisbury	15 September 2004 (age 22)	(New Zealand Football) Roslyn-Wakari
14	DF	Luke Tolo Kent	29 April 2003 (age 23)	(New Zealand Football) Miramar Rangers
15	MF	Reupena Fatu	14 January 2005 (age 21)	(Football Federation Samoa) Goldstar Sogi
16	MF	Alton Leiataua	27 November 2005 (age 20)	(Football Federation Samoa) Vaivase-Tai
17	FW	Kyah Cahill	13 March 2003 (age 23)	(Qatar Football Association) Lusail
18	FW	Alex Malauulu	12 March 2006 (age 20)	(Football Australia) Monaro Panthers
19	DF	Samuel Tauai	17 May 2004 (age 22)	(Football Federation Samoa) Lepea
20	FW	Lesley Bethem	15 May 2004 (age 22)	(Football Federation Samoa) Faleasiu
21	MF	Jonny Aoelua	22 November 2003 (age 22)	(Football Federation Samoa) Lepea
22	GK	Semu Faimata	10 August 2003 (age 23)	(Football Federation Samoa) Vailima Kiwi
23	GK	James Settle	15 July 2003 (age 23)	(United States Soccer Federation) Corondao
24	FW	Ethan Stowers	26 May 2005 (age 21)	(Football Federation Samoa) Fa'atoia United
25	MF	Philip Fatialofa	26 June 2005 (age 21)	(New Zealand Football) Stop Out
26	GK	Neville Peni	18 August 2004 (age 22)	(Football Federation Samoa) Faleasiu

=== Vanuatu ===
- Coach: Francois Sakama

No.	Pos.	Player	Date of birth (age)	Club
1	GK	Brendon Tankon	24 July 2003 (age 23)	(Vanuatu Football Federation) Teouma Academy
2	DF	Quinton Tawia	19 April 2004 (age 22)	(Vanuatu Football Federation) Amicale
3	DF	Enock James	12 January 2004 (age 22)	(Vanuatu Football Federation) ABM Galaxy
4	DF	Edward Roqara	16 April 2004 (age 22)	(Vanuatu Football Federation) VFF Academy
5	DF	Daniel Roro	12 April 2004 (age 22)	(Vanuatu Football Federation) VFF Academy
6	MF	Shem Sopuso	19 October 2003 (age 22)	(Vanuatu Football Federation) VFF Academy
7	MF	Jerison John	2 April 2003 (age 23)	(Vanuatu Football Federation) VFF Academy
8	MF	Jordan Nirua	1 January 2003 (age 23)	(Vanuatu Football Federation) VFF Academy
9	FW	Bill Willie	16 November 2004 (age 21)	(Vanuatu Football Federation) VFF Academy
10	MF	Chima Chillia	24 December 2003 (age 22)	(Vanuatu Football Federation) Tupuji Imere
11	FW	Tari Laurentin	27 July 2003 (age 23)	(Vanuatu Football Federation) United Malampa
12	MF	Gerard Avock	21 December 2004 (age 21)	(Vanuatu Football Federation) Mauriki
13	DF	Bathis Nalau	5 May 2004 (age 22)	(Vanuatu Football Federation) Teouma Academy
14	MF	AJ Rozach Zakarie	19 April 2004 (age 22)	(Vanuatu Football Federation) Teouma Academy
15	MF	Solo Namani	6 October 2004 (age 22)	(Vanuatu Football Federation) VFF Academy
16	DF	Bob Bae	14 December 2003 (age 22)	(Vanuatu Football Federation) VFF Academy
17	DF	Nicholas King	14 April 2004 (age 22)	(Vanuatu Football Federation) Mauriki
18	MF	Thomas Maliwan	26 January 2005 (age 21)	(Vanuatu Football Federation) Tafea
19	MF	Ron Takau	25 July 2004 (age 22)	(Vanuatu Football Federation) VFF Academy
20	FW	Sergio Waoute	3 November 2006 (age 19)	(Vanuatu Football Federation) VFF Academy
21	MF	Newton Tabe	9 February 2004 (age 22)	(Vanuatu Football Federation) Amicale
22	GK	Markson Kalsrap	8 April 2003 (age 23)	(Vanuatu Football Federation) Mauriki
23	MF	Roger Waoute	14 July 2003 (age 23)	(Vanuatu Football Federation) Erakor Golden Star
24	DF	Brian Pakoa	13 August 2004 (age 22)	(Vanuatu Football Federation) Amicale
25	DF	Luis Ute	2 September 2003 (age 23)	(Vanuatu Football Federation) Tafea
26	GK	Alison Hungai	26 June 2004 (age 22)	(Vanuatu Football Federation) ABM Galaxy
