= 2016 FFAS Senior League =

FFAS Senior League
- Season: 2016
- Champions: Pago Youth FC
- Matches: 25
- Goals: 94 (3.76 per match)
- Biggest home win: Pago Youth 10-0 Royal Puma
- Highest scoring: Pago Youth 10-0 Royal Puma

The 2016 season of the FFAS Senior League Division 1 was the thirty-sixth season of association football competition in American Samoa. The league was contested by 10 teams.

== Clubs ==
These are the teams for the 2016 season.

- Black Roses
- Green Bay
- Ilaoa and To'omata
- Lion Heart
- Pago Youth
- PanSa East
- Royal Puma
- Tafuna Jets
- Utulei Youth
- Vaiala Tongan

== League table ==
Pos	Team	Pld	W	D	L	GF	GA	GD	Pts	Qualification
1	Utulei Youth	9	8	1	0	25	6	+19	25	Championship Round
2	Pago Youth	9	7	2	0	37	5	+32	23	Championship Round
3	Lion Heart	9	7	0	2	27	7	+20	21	Championship Round
4	Tafuna Jets	9	4	3	2	16	10	+6	15	Championship Round
5	Vaiala Tongan	9	4	0	5	14	20	−6	12	Championship Round
6	Ilaoa & To’omata	9	3	1	5	12	13	−1	10	
7	Green Bay	9	3	1	5	16	22	−6	10	
8	Black Roses	9	3	0	6	12	18	−6	9	
9	Royal Puma	9	2	0	7	12	28	−16	6	
10	PanSa	9	0	0	9	3	45	−42	0	

Rules for classification: 1) points; 2) goal difference; 3) number of goals scored.

== Championship League table ==
Pos	Team	Pld	W	D	L	GF	GA	GD	Pts	Qualification
1	Pago Youth (C, Q)	4	4	0	0	13	1	+12	12	2018 OFC Champions League: Preliminary Stage
2	Utulei Youth	4	2	0	2	7	4	+3	6	
3	Lion Heart	4	1	1	2	4	5	−1	4	
4	Tafuna Jets	4	1	1	2	3	9	−6	4	
5	Vaiala Tongan	4	0	2	2	1	9	−8	2	

Rules for classification: 1) points; 2) goal difference; 3) number of goals scored.
(C) Champions; (Q) Qualified for the phase indicated
