= 2019 OFC U-19 Women's Championship squads =

The following is the squad list for the 2019 OFC U-19 Women's Championship. Each squad consisted of 20 players in total, 2 of whom had to be goalkeepers.

== Group A ==
=== Cook Islands ===
Head coach: Tuka Tisam

The final squad was announced on 30 August.

No.	Pos.	Player	Date of birth (age)	Club
1	GK	Daimzel Rongokea	29 July 2001 (aged 18)	(Cook Islands Football Association)
2	DF	Merran Munro	22 August 2002 (aged 17)	(Cook Islands Football Association) Puaikura
3	DF	Teretia Teinaki	23 January 2002 (aged 17)	(Cook Islands Football Association) Tupapa Maraerenga
4	DF	Esther Potoru	26 May 2002 (aged 17)	(Cook Islands Football Association) Puaikura
5	DF	Tiamarama Tuivaga	26 June 2001 (aged 18)	(Cook Islands Football Association) Puaikura
6	MF	Tehinnah Tatuava	15 April 2002 (aged 17)	(Cook Islands Football Association) Titikaveka
7	MF	Piri Murare	16 August 2001 (aged 18)	(Cook Islands Football Association) Avatiu
8	MF	Jessica Warmington		(New Zealand Football) Papatoetoe
9	FW	Kuramaeva Mose	26 June 2004 (aged 15)	(Cook Islands Football Association)
10	MF	Ngametua Taringa	2 March 2002 (aged 17)	(Cook Islands Football Association) Titikaveka
11	FW	Moeroa Harmon	8 July 2000 (aged 19)	(Cook Islands Football Association) Tupapa Maraerenga
12	MF	Ngamata Moekaa		(Cook Islands Football Association)
13	MF	Tarita Mamanu		(Cook Islands Football Association)
14	DF	Eitiare Tangirere	8 September 2001 (aged 17)	(Cook Islands Football Association) Titikaveka
15	MF	Lyric Davison	11 April 2002 (aged 17)	(New Zealand Football) Ellerslie
16	FW	Keana Maaka	10 October 2002 (aged 16)	(Cook Islands Football Association) Avatiu
17	DF	Tepaeru Ngaroi	8 September 2003 (aged 15)	(Cook Islands Football Association) Takuvaine
18	DF	Tineke De Jong	26 May 2002 (aged 17)	(Cook Islands Football Association) Titikaveka
20	GK	Alma Ngametua	19 January 2003 (aged 16)	(Cook Islands Football Association) Nikao Sokattak

=== Fiji ===
Head coach: Sunil Kumar

The final squad was announced on 30 August.

No.	Pos.	Player	Date of birth (age)	Club
1	GK	Maria Elder Parr	22 February 2000 (aged 19)	(Fiji Football Association) Ba
2	DF	Lusiana Lagilevu	22 March 2001 (aged 18)	(Fiji Football Association) Ba
3	DF	Ledua Senisea	14 April 2000 (aged 19)	(Fiji Football Association) Nadi
4	DF	Amelia Cevariki	12 August 2001 (aged 18)	(Fiji Football Association) Navua
5	DF	Laniana Qereqeretabua	22 May 2002 (aged 17)	(Fiji Football Association) Ba
6	MF	Sainiana Niubalavu	21 March 2001 (aged 18)	(Fiji Football Association) Ba
7	MF	Koleta Likuculacula	17 August 2000 (aged 19)	(Fiji Football Association) Ba
8	MF	Adi Bakaniceva	9 March 2004 (aged 15)	(Fiji Football Association) Tailevu Naitasiri
9	FW	Asenaca Diranuve	25 May 2000 (aged 19)	(Fiji Football Association) Savusavu
10	MF	Asilika Gasau	15 February 2001 (aged 18)	(Fiji Football Association) Suva
11	FW	Emily Rokociri	12 November 2001 (aged 17)	(Fiji Football Association) Rewa
12	MF	Louisa Simmons	3 March 2000 (aged 19)	(Fiji Football Association) Ba
13	MF	Kelera Radinicalia	31 July 2001 (aged 18)	(Fiji Football Association) Navua
14	FW	Anasimeci Volitikoro	9 May 2002 (aged 17)	(Fiji Football Association) Labasa
15	DF	Losana Bainivalu	19 December 2001 (aged 17)	(Fiji Football Association) Tailevu Naitasiri
16	MF	Dilaisana Drodrolagi	17 February 2001 (aged 18)	(Fiji Football Association) Tailevu Naitasiri
17	MF	Titilia Waqabaca	18 May 2001 (aged 18)	(Fiji Football Association) Ba
18	MF	Fulori Sukulu		(Fiji Football Association) Ba
19	FW	Vitalina Naikore		(Fiji Football Association) Labasa
20	GK	Seru Vasuitoga	21 October 2002 (aged 16)	(Fiji Football Association) Nasinu

=== Solomon Islands ===
Head coach: Patrick Miniti

The final squad was announced on 30 August.

No.	Pos.	Player	Date of birth (age)	Club
1	GK	Serah Alpefolosia		(Solomon Islands Football Federation) Bula Frangipani
2	DF	Edith Nari	28 August 2003 (aged 16)	(Solomon Islands Football Federation) Bula Frangipani
3	DF	Deborah Kali		(Solomon Islands Football Federation) Bula Frangipani
4	MF	Sandra Wale		(Solomon Islands Football Federation) Solomon Warriors
5	DF	Margaret Namoi		(Solomon Islands Football Federation) Bula Frangipani
6	MF	Cecilia Omearo		(Solomon Islands Football Federation) Bula Frangipani
7	FW	Madlyn Arukau		(Solomon Islands Football Federation) Kossa
8	DF	Cathy Fonoisimae		(Solomon Islands Football Federation) Koloale FC Honiara
9	FW	Dollin Usua		(Solomon Islands Football Federation) Bula Frangipani
10	FW	Daylin Kali		(Solomon Islands Football Federation) Bula Frangipani
11	FW	Jojo Ledi		(Solomon Islands Football Federation) Bula Frangipani
12	GK	Florence Ince		(Solomon Islands Football Federation) Bula Frangipani
13	DF	Indy Ringo		(Solomon Islands Football Federation) Koloale FC Honiara
14	FW	Mavis Wale		(Solomon Islands Football Federation) Solomon Warriors
15	MF	Rose Arata		(Solomon Islands Football Federation) Bula Frangipani
16	DF	Sharoly Saeni		(Solomon Islands Football Federation) Solomon Warriors
17	MF	Rachel Rex		(Solomon Islands Football Federation) Solomon Warriors
18	MF	Alisha Donga	12 April 2002 (aged 17)	(Solomon Islands Football Federation) Solomon Warriors
19	MF	Mercy Wateobea		(Solomon Islands Football Federation)
20	FW	Melissa Marei		(Solomon Islands Football Federation) Koloale FC Honiara

=== Vanuatu ===
Head coach: Jean Robert Yelou

The final squad was announced on 30 August.

No.	Pos.	Player	Date of birth (age)	Club
1	GK	Cloe Tate	6 June 2000 (aged 19)	(Vanuatu Football Federation)
2		Dannie Wanemut		(Vanuatu Football Federation)
3		Tiffany Sope		(Vanuatu Football Federation)
4		Limas Erickan		(Vanuatu Football Federation)
5		Noeline Erickan		(Vanuatu Football Federation)
6		Selena Poida		(Vanuatu Football Federation)
7	MF	Rita Solomon	29 March 2001 (aged 18)	(Vanuatu Football Federation)
8		Matilda Kalkau		(Vanuatu Football Federation)
9		Bindy Erickan		(Vanuatu Football Federation)
10		Annie Gere	31 January 2001 (aged 18)	(Vanuatu Football Federation)
11		Anais Kalopong		(Vanuatu Football Federation)
12	FW	Cynthia Ngwele	21 September 2001 (aged 17)	(Vanuatu Football Federation)
13		Suzanne Nawen		(Vanuatu Football Federation)
14		Melanie Timatua		(Vanuatu Football Federation)
15		Emma Wanemut		(Vanuatu Football Federation)
16		Nettie Kalsau	20 February 2001 (aged 18)	(Vanuatu Football Federation)
17		Vaina Alphonse		(Vanuatu Football Federation)
18		Daina Sine		(Vanuatu Football Federation)
19		Celestine Kalopong	30 May 2002 (aged 17)	(Vanuatu Football Federation)
20	GK	Amelia Redy	8 March 2002 (aged 17)	(Vanuatu Football Federation)

== Group B ==
=== American Samoa ===
Head coach: (United States) Steve Settle

The final squad was announced on 31 August.

No.	Pos.	Player	Date of birth (age)	Club
1	GK	Malia Iolama		(Football Federation American Samoa)
2	DF	Olivia Vaiomounga		(Football Federation American Samoa) Green Bay
3	DF	Susanna Lutali		(Football Federation American Samoa) Pago Youth
4	DF	Veronica Iupati		(Football Federation American Samoa) Ilaoa and To'omata
5	DF	Tatiana Jackson		
6	MF	Aileen Ieremia	July 12, 2001 (aged 18)	(Football Federation American Samoa)
7	FW	Aggie Pati	November 19, 2003 (aged 15)	(Football Federation American Samoa) Black Roses
8	MF	Precious Ieremia		(Football Federation American Samoa) Green Bay
9	MF	Elcy Lui	June 19, 2002 (aged 17)	(Football Federation American Samoa) Vaiala Tongan
10	MF	Eseta Enesi		(Football Federation American Samoa) Pago Youth
11	MF	Agnes Siaosi	November 27, 2002 (aged 16)	(Football Federation American Samoa) Vaiala Tongan
12	DF	Ama Faleao		(Football Federation American Samoa) Ilaoa and To'omata
13	FW	Oloa Tofaeono	November 17, 2002 (aged 16)	(Football Federation American Samoa) Vaiala Tongan
14	MF	Eliza Berondo		(Football Federation American Samoa) PanSa East
15	DF	Shaloriana Tauaefa		(Football Federation American Samoa)
16	FW	Precious Faamoana		(Football Federation American Samoa)
17	MF	Grace Malaefono		(Football Federation American Samoa)
23	GK	Destiny Kapisi		(Football Federation American Samoa)

=== New Zealand ===
Head coach: (Wales) Gemma Lewis

The final squad was announced on 6 August.

No.	Pos.	Player	Date of birth (age)	Club
1	GK	Nadia Olla	7 February 2000 (aged 19)	(New Zealand Football) Western Springs
2	DF	Mackenzie Barry	11 April 2001 (aged 18)	(New Zealand Football) Forrest Hill Milford
3	DF	Hannah Mackay-Wright	8 January 2001 (aged 18)	(New Zealand Football) Dunedin Technical
4	DF	Aneka Mittendorff	6 August 2001 (aged 18)	(New Zealand Football) Forrest Hill Milford
5	DF	Marisa van der Meer	9 January 1999 (aged 20)	(New Zealand Football) Cashmere Technical
6	MF	Rose Morton	2 May 2000 (aged 19)	(New Zealand Football) Dunedin Technical
7	FW	Gabi Rennie	7 July 2001 (aged 18)	(New Zealand Football) Waimakariri United
8	MF	Amelia Abbott	22 July 2001 (aged 18)	(New Zealand Football) Nelson Suburbs
9	FW	Maggie Jenkins	14 June 2001 (aged 18)	(New Zealand Football) Glenfield Rovers
10	FW	Grace Wisnewski	28 June 2002 (aged 17)	(New Zealand Football) Hamilton Wanderers
11	FW	Kelli Brown	21 February 2001 (aged 18)	(New Zealand Football) Forrest Hill Milford
12	GK	Alisha Perry		(New Zealand Football) Three Kings United
13	MF	Charlotte Wilford-Carroll		(New Zealand Football) Wellington United
14	FW	Arabella Maynard	8 August 2001 (aged 18)	(New Zealand Football) Forrest Hill Milford
15	DF	Dani Ward		(Football Australia) The Gap
16	DF	Lara Wall		(New Zealand Football) Cashmere Technical
17	DF	Tahlia Herman-Watt		(New Zealand Football) Coastal Spirit
18	FW	Rene Wasi		(New Zealand Football) Forrest Hill Milford
19	MF	Ava Collins		(New Zealand Football) Eastern Suburbs

=== Samoa ===
Head coach: Lanuola Mulipola

The final squad was announced on 31 August.

=== Tahiti ===
Head coach: Stéphanie Spielmann

The final squad was announced on 31 August.

No.	Pos.	Player	Date of birth (age)	Club
1	GK	Corail Harry	19 October 2001 (aged 17)	(Tahitian Football Federation)
2	DF	Temenava Fournier		(Tahitian Football Federation)
4	DF	Babou Tepea	26 July 2002 (aged 17)	(Tahitian Football Federation)
5	MF	Julienne Naomi		(Tahitian Football Federation)
6	DF	Lokelani Hauata	6 July 2001 (aged 18)	(Tahitian Football Federation)
7	MF	Kohai Mai		(Tahitian Football Federation)
8	DF	Merehau Iotua	24 April 2002 (aged 17)	(Tahitian Football Federation)
9	FW	Tetia Mose		(Tahitian Football Federation)
10	MF	Tiarehinano Tekakioteragi	15 March 2003 (aged 16)	(Tahitian Football Federation)
11	FW	Tahia Tamarii	8 May 2001 (aged 18)	(Tahitian Football Federation)
12	MF	Vahuariki Tufaunui	5 September 2002 (aged 16)	(Tahitian Football Federation)
13	DF	Ahuura Chin		(Tahitian Football Federation)
14	DF	Hana Kimitete	11 June 2001 (aged 18)	(Tahitian Football Federation)
15	DF	Mihitua Tihoni	4 November 2000 (aged 18)	(Tahitian Football Federation)
17	MF	Kiani Wong	4 November 2000 (aged 18)	(French Football Federation)
18	FW	Christiane Tetavahi		(Tahitian Football Federation)
19		Mitiura Paint-Koui		(Tahitian Football Federation)
20	GK	Hereura Chu		(Tahitian Football Federation)

== Group C ==
=== New Caledonia ===
Head coach: Coralie Bretegnier

The final squad was announced on 30 August.

No.	Pos.	Player	Date of birth (age)	Club
1	GK	Brigitte Wadra		(New Caledonian Football Federation)
2	MF	Jaëlle Sinyeue		(New Caledonian Football Federation)
3	DF	Océane Zasina		(New Caledonian Football Federation)
4	DF	Edsy Matao	10 August 2001 (aged 18)	(New Caledonian Football Federation) Lössi
5	DF	Mélissa Iekawe	16 July 2003 (aged 16)	(New Caledonian Football Federation) Magenta
6	DF	Justine Malaxan	20 March 2001 (aged 18)	(New Caledonian Football Federation) Ne Drehu
7	FW	Jackie Pahoa	5 November 2001 (aged 17)	(New Caledonian Football Federation) Academie Feminine
8	MF	Chloé Ufepi	22 August 2003 (aged 16)	(New Caledonian Football Federation) Horizon Patho
9	FW	Jennifer Neporo		(New Caledonian Football Federation)
10	FW	Alizé Sakilia	19 May 2003 (aged 16)	(New Caledonian Football Federation) We Luecilla
11	MF	Joana Boula		(New Caledonian Football Federation)
12	MF	Ashley Gelima		(New Caledonian Football Federation)
13	MF	Marthe Katrawa	20 November 2002 (aged 16)	(New Caledonian Football Federation) Qanono Sport
14	FW	Mauranne Meindu		(New Caledonian Football Federation)
15	DF	Shamany Naaoutchoue		(New Caledonian Football Federation)
16	GK	Clarisse Wahnapo		(New Caledonian Football Federation)
17	FW	Salomee Poma		(New Caledonian Football Federation)
18	DF	Laëtitia Leme	9 August 2001 (aged 18)	(New Caledonian Football Federation)
19	MF	Cassidy Cawa	5 April 2000 (aged 19)	(New Caledonian Football Federation) Wetr

=== Papua New Guinea ===
Head coach: Rachel Wadunah

The final squad was announced on 30 August.

No.	Pos.	Player	Date of birth (age)	Club
1	GK	Benadette Rupi		(Papua New Guinea Football Association)
2	DF	Fidorah Namuesh	4 December 2002 (aged 16)	(Papua New Guinea Football Association)
3	DF	Norma Kasiray		(Papua New Guinea Football Association)
4	DF	Susan Manas		(Papua New Guinea Football Association)
5	DF	Nicole Bekio		(Papua New Guinea Football Association)
6	DF	Jerolyn Gala		(Papua New Guinea Football Association)
7	MF	Abigail Wagol		(Papua New Guinea Football Association)
8	MF	Shalom Waida	1 January 2001 (aged 18)	(Papua New Guinea Football Association)
9	FW	Asaiso Gossie	18 April 2003 (aged 16)	(Papua New Guinea Football Association)
10		Ruth Giada		(Papua New Guinea Football Association)
11		Kenziro Samson		(Papua New Guinea Football Association)
12	MF	Sylvia Jangiko		(Papua New Guinea Football Association)
13		Jasmine Vago		(Papua New Guinea Football Association)
14		Christie Maneu		(Papua New Guinea Football Association)
15		Dephney Pari		(Papua New Guinea Football Association)
16		Sagude Zale		(Papua New Guinea Football Association)
17		Carol Albert		(Papua New Guinea Football Association)
18		Mareerose Wadunah		(Papua New Guinea Football Association)
19		Joan Uttie		(Papua New Guinea Football Association)
20	GK	Olive Nangan		(Papua New Guinea Football Association)

=== Tonga ===
Head coach: Lafaele Moala
