= Ramin Ott =

American Samoan footballer (born 1986)

Personal information
- Date of birth: 18 June 1986 (age 40)
- Place of birth: Pago Pago, American Samoa
- Position: Striker

Senior career*
| Years | Team | Apps | (Gls) |
| 2003–2007 | Konica Machine | | |
| 2008–2012 | Bay Olympic | | |
| 2014 | Bay Olympic | | |
| 2015–2016 | Pago Youth | | |

International career
| 2003 | American Samoa U17 | 4 | (1) |
| 2004–2015 | American Samoa | 15 | (3) |
- * Club domestic league appearances and goals

Ramin Ott (born 18 June 1986) is an American Samoan former footballer who played as a striker in the FFAS Senior League. Internationally, he represented the American Samoa national team and was their all time top goalscorer between 2015 and 2026.

== Club career ==
=== Konica Machine ===
Born in Pago Pago on 18 June 1986, Ramin Ott began his career at Konica Machine in 2003 but he did not make his debut for the club until 2004. At Konica Machine, his team finished runner-up in the ASFA Soccer League in 2005 and won the league title in 2007.

=== Bay Olympic ===
He then joined New Zealand Northern League club Bay Olympic during the 2008–09 season as part of his studies. He won the league with Bay Olympic in 2011 and 2012.

He also played for Bay Olympic in 2014.

=== Pago Youth ===
He then took a break from his club career before joining Pago Youth in 2015. Aged 30, Ott retired after he won the FFAS Senior League in 2016.

== International career ==
Ramin Ott initially represented American Samoa U17 during the 2003 OFC U-17 Championship. He debuted during a 0–0 draw against the Cook Islands U17 on 13 February 2003, and he scored during a 3–1 loss against Samoa U-17.

Ott made his senior debut for American Samoa on 10 May 2004 during a 4–0 loss against Samoa during 2006 FIFA World Cup qualification. His first international goal would come three years later on 25 August 2007 during a 12–1 loss against the Solomon Islands during the 2007 South Pacific Games.

He would play again for American Samoa during 2011 and scored again during a 2–1 win against Tonga during 2014 FIFA World Cup qualification which was also American Samoa's first victory since becoming a FIFA member.

His final goal came during 2018 FIFA World Cup qualification when American Samoa saw another 2–1 victory against Tonga, and he became their all time top goalscorer with three goals. His final of fifteen caps also came in American Samoa's next game, a 2–0 win against the Cook Islands on 4 September 2015.

== Personal life ==
His brother Diamond is also a footballer who has represented the American Samoa national team.

== Career statistics ==
=== International ===
As of match played 15 September 2015.

Appearances and goals by national team and year
| National team | Year | Apps | Goals |
|---|---|---|---|
| American Samoa | 2004 | 4 | 0 |
| American Samoa | 2005 | 0 | 0 |
| American Samoa | 2006 | 0 | 0 |
| American Samoa | 2007 | 4 | 1 |
| American Samoa | 2008 | 0 | 0 |
| American Samoa | 2009 | 0 | 0 |
| American Samoa | 2010 | 0 | 0 |
| American Samoa | 2011 | 3 | 1 |
| American Samoa | 2012 | 0 | 0 |
| American Samoa | 2013 | 0 | 0 |
| American Samoa | 2014 | 0 | 0 |
| American Samoa | 2015 | 4 | 1 |
| Total | | 15 | 3 |

Scores and results list American Samoa's goal tally first, score column indicates score after each Ott goal.

List of international goals scored by Ramin Ott
| No. | Date | Venue | Cap | Opponent | Score | Result | Competition | Ref. |
|---|---|---|---|---|---|---|---|---|
| 1. | 25 August 2007 | Toleafoa J.S. Blatter Complex, Apia, Samoa | 5 | Solomon Islands | 1–5 | 1–12 | 2007 South Pacific Games | |
| 2. | 22 November 2011 | National Soccer Stadium, Apia, Samoa | 9 | Tonga | 1–0 | 2–1 | 2014 FIFA World Cup qualification | |
| 3. | 2 September 2015 | Loto-Tonga Soka Centre (Field 1), ‘Atele, Tonga | 14 | Tonga | 2–1 | 2–1 | 2018 FIFA World Cup qualification | |

== Honours ==
Konica Machine

- ASFA Soccer League
  - Champions (1): 2007
  - Runners-up (1): 2005

Pago Youth

- FFAS Senior League
  - Champions (1): 2016

Bay Olympic

- New Zealand Northern League
  - Champions (2): 2011, 2012
