= 2006 ASFA Soccer League =

FFAS Senior League
- Season: 2006
- Champions: Tafuna Jets

The 2006 season of the ASFA Soccer League (now known as the FFAS Senior League) was the twenty sixth season of association football competition in American Samoa. Tafuna Jets won the championship, their first title in twenty-one years existence. Winning qualified the Jets to the 2007 OFC Champions League however the team did not choose to compete.

== League setup ==
Nine teams, all from American Samoa competed in two groups with the top two from each group advancing to a knockout round for the championship.

== Group stage ==
=== Pool 1 ===
Pos	Team	Pld	W	D	L	GF	GA	GD	Pts	Qualification
1	Flame On (Q)	4	3	1	0	17	9	+8	10	Qualification for semi finals
2	Pacific Products	4	3	0	1	26	4	+22	9	Qualification for semi finals
3	Utulei Youth	4	1	2	1	14	11	+3	5	
4	Tafuna Jets 2	4	1	0	3	8	23	−15	3	
5	Tafuna Jets 3	4	0	1	3	13	31	−18	1	

Updated to match(es) played on 26 October 2007. Source: American Samoa 2007 from RSSSF.com
Rules for classification: 1) points; 2) goal difference; 3) number of goals scored.
(Q) Qualified for the phase indicated

=== Pool 2 ===
Pos	Team	Pld	W	D	L	GF	GA	GD	Pts	Qualification
1	Peace Brothers (Q)	3	2	0	1	6	0	+6	6	Qualification for semi finals
2	Tafuna Jets (Q)	3	1	2	0	0	3	−3	5	Qualification for semi finals
3	FC SKBC (Note: SKBC stands for South Korean Baptist Church)	3	1	1	1	4	6	−2	4	
4	Konica	3	0	1	2	6	8	−2	1	

Updated to match(es) played on 26 October 2007. Source: American Samoa 2007 from RSSSF.com
Rules for classification: 1) points; 2) goal difference; 3) number of goals scored.
(Q) Qualified for the phase indicated

=== Semi-finals ===
9 December 2006

Peace Brothers	2-6	Pacific Products
	Source

9 December 2006

Flame On	1-2	Tafuna Jets
	Source

=== Final ===
December 2006

Tafuna Jets	3–0	Pacific Products
	Source
