= 2008 FFAS Senior League =

FFAS Senior League
- Season: 2008
- Champions: Pago Youth
- Matches: 78
- Goals: 496 (6.36 per match)
- Biggest home win: Black Roses 20–0 Ilaoa and Toomata
- Biggest away win: Fagatogo 0–16 Black Roses
- Highest scoring: Black Roses 20–0 Ilaoa and Toomata

The 2008 season of the FFAS Senior League was the twenty-eighth season of association football competition in American Samoa. Pago Youth won the championship, their first recorded title, with the winners of the 1998 league competition and a number of previous seasons unknown.

== League table ==
| Pos | Team | Pld | W | D | L | GF | GA | GD | Pts |
|---|---|---|---|---|---|---|---|---|---|
| 1 | Pago Youth (C) | 12 | 11 | 1 | 0 | 48 | 19 | +29 | 34 (Note: The results of the Pago Youth v Peace Brothers, Pago Youth v Ilaoa and Toomata and Fagasa Youth v Green Bay are inferred by the source.) |
| 2 | Black Roses | 12 | 10 | 0 | 2 | 90 | 20 | +70 | 30 |
| 3 | Renegades | 12 | 10 | 0 | 2 | 40 | 19 | +21 | 30 |
| 4 | PanSa Men's | 12 | 8 | 0 | 4 | 58 | 20 | +38 | 24 |
| 5 | Tafuna Jets | 12 | 8 | 0 | 4 | 48 | 19 | +29 | 24 |
| 6 | Lion Heart | 12 | 7 | 2 | 3 | 50 | 15 | +35 | 23 |
| 7 | Fagasa Youth | 12 | 5 | 2 | 5 | 39 | 33 | +6 | 17 |
| 8 | Fagatogo | 12 | 5 | 0 | 7 | 34 | 54 | −20 | 15 |
| 9 | Green Bay | 12 | 4 | 1 | 7 | 36 | 51 | −15 | 13 |
| 10 | FC SKBC (Note: FC SKBC stands for South Korean Baptist Church.) | 12 | 3 | 0 | 9 | 15 | 74 | −59 | 9 |
| 11 | Peace Brothers | 12 | 2 | 1 | 9 | 20 | 56 | −36 | 7 |
| 12 | Ilaoa and Toomata | 12 | 1 | 1 | 10 | 15 | 57 | −42 | 4 |
| 13 | Utulei Youth (D) | 12 | 0 | 0 | 12 | 3 | 65 | −62 | 0 (Note: Utulei Youth were disqualified from the competition after round eight, following three forfeits for failing to appear. Their remaining matches were awarded to their opponents 3–0.) |

Updated to match(es) played on 22 November 2008. Source:
Rules for classification: 1) points; 2) goal difference; 3) number of goals scored. Note: Total goal difference = -6 in source.
(C) Champions; (D) Disqualified

== Results ==
The matrix below contains a record of all the known results for the season.

| Home \ Away | BLR | FAY | FGT | SKB | GRE | I&T | LIO | PGY | PSM | PEA | REN | TAF | UTU |
|---|---|---|---|---|---|---|---|---|---|---|---|---|---|
| Black Roses | | | | 6–0 | | 20–0 | | 2–4 | 3–2 | | 5–1 | 8–5 | 3–0 |
| Fagasa Youth | | | 3–0 | | 2–0 | 2–2 | | | | | 1–3 | 0–3 | 3–0 |
| Fagatogo | 0–16 | | | | | | 3–0 | | | 5–3 | | | |
| FC SKBC | | | | | 3–4 | 3–0 | | | | 3–0 | | | 3–0 |
| Green Bay | | | 8–2 | | | 3–0 | | | | 1–1 | | | 11–1 |
| Ilaoa and Toomata | | | | | | | | | 0–3 | 5–6 | | | 3–0 |
| Lion Heart | | | | 11–0 | | 5–1 | | 1–1 | 1–4 | | | | 12–1 |
| Pago Youth | | 9–1 | 5–3 | 5–1 | | 3–2 | | | 4–3 | 5–2 | 5–2 | | 3–0 |
| PanSa Men's | | 3–2 | 6–2 | 12–2 | | | | | | 9–0 | | | 3–0 |
| Peace Brothers | | | | | | | | | | | 0–3 | | 3–0 |
| Renegades | | | 5–1 | | | 4–2 | | | | | | 3–1 | 3–0 |
| Tafuna Jets | | | 9–2 | | 3–0 | | 0–1 | | | 3–2 | | | |
| Utulei Youth | | | | | | | | | | | | 1–12 | |

Updated to match(es) played on 27 Nov 2008. Source:
Legend: Blue = home team win; Yellow = draw; Red = away team win.
- Note 1: Pool was played on a round robin basis, results are reported as per RSSSF, hence why some teams appear to have played more "home" games than others.
- Note 2: A significant number of games, beyond those awarded as a result of the disqualification of Utuliei Youth, were awarded 3–0. All matches in the above matrix that finished either 3–0 or 0–3 were awarded with the exception of the match between Fagasa Youth and Tafuna Jets.
- Note 3: The match between FC SKBC and Peace Brothers was awarded 3–0 to FC SKBC after the game was abandoned in the 85th minute with the score 3–2 to Peace Brothers when Peace Brothers were left with only six players on the field.

The following results, but not scores, are also known:

- Round 4: Fagatogo, Tafuna Jets and Renegades won away at Utulei Youth, FC SKBC and Lion Heart respectively, whilst Fagasa Youth and Green Bay lost away at Black Roses and PanSa Men's respectively.
- Round 5: Fagasa Youth drew with Lion Heart, Black Roses and Renegades won away at Peace Brothers and Green Bay respectively, whilst PanSa Men's and FC SKBC lost away at Tafuna Jets and Fagatogo respectively.
- Round 9: Fagatogo and Pago Youth won away at Peace Brothers and Green Bay respectively, whilst Ilaoa and Toomata, FC SKBC and Black Roses lost away at Tafuna Jets, Renegades and Lion Heart respectively.
- Round 10: Fagatogo, Fagasa Youth and Renegades won away at Ilaoa and Toomata, FC SKBC and PanSa Men's respectively, whilst Tafuna Jets and Green Bay lost away at Pago Youth and Black Roses respectively.
