= 2013 FFAS Senior League =

FFAS Senior League
- Season: 2013
- Champions: FC SKBC
- Matches: 28
- Goals: 117 (4.18 per match)

The 2013 season of the FFAS Senior League was the thirty-three season of association football competition in American Samoa. SKBC won the championship, their first recorded title.

== Format ==
Eight teams competed in the league. The top team became the champion. Seventh place played in a relegation playoff against the second place finisher from division 2. Last place was automatically relegated, replaced by division 2 winner.

== Table ==
Pos	Team	Pld	W	D	L	GF	GA	GD	Pts	Qualification or relegation
1	FC SKBC (C)	7	6	0	1	13	3	+10	18	2014–15 OFC Champions League preliminary stage
2	Pago Youth A	7	5	1	1	31	8	+23	16	
3	Tafuna Jets A	7	4	2	1	16	8	+8	14	
4	Taputimu Youth	7	4	2	1	14	8	+6	14	
5	Utulei Youth	7	2	1	4	15	18	−3	7	
6	Lion Hearts	7	2	1	4	12	16	−4	7	
7	Black Roses	7	1	1	5	9	18	−9	4	Qualification for relegation play-offs
8	Pago Youth B	7	0	0	7	7	38	−31	0	2014 Division 2

Updated to match(es) played on 4 April 2013. Source:
Rules for classification: 1) points; 2) goal difference; 3) number of goals scored.
(C) Champions
