= 2021 OFC Champions League =

Tournament details
- Dates: Cancelled
- Teams: 18 (expected) (from 11 associations)

The 2021 OFC Champions League was originally to be the 20th edition of the Oceanian Club Championship, Oceania's premier club football tournament organized by the Oceania Football Confederation (OFC), and the 15th season under the current OFC Champions League name.

The tournament, which would usually be played in the first half of the year, were originally postponed to start no earlier than 1 July due to border closures throughout the Pacific caused by the COVID-19 pandemic. On 4 June 2021, the OFC announced that the tournament had been cancelled, and no champions would be awarded for the second season in a row. The OFC representative at the 2021 FIFA Club World Cup in the United Arab Emirates, which would originally be the winners of the 2021 OFC Champions League, was confirmed to be Auckland City on 3 August 2021 following a decision by the OFC Executive Committee, based on sporting merit principles which took into consideration the final placing of every member association's national league champion and runner-up in each OFC Champions League between 2016 and 2020, with the results combined to determine an overall ranking, and applied to the clubs nominated by their member association as the champion or runner-up from their respective national leagues to qualify for the 2021 OFC Champions League. However, on 31 December 2021, FIFA announced that Auckland City had withdrawn from the competition due to the COVID-19 pandemic and related quarantine measures required by the New Zealand authorities. As a result, AS Pirae were nominated as the OFC's representative in their place.

Hienghène Sport, having won the title in 2019, were the title holders, since the 2020 edition was cancelled due to the COVID-19 pandemic and the title was not awarded. However, they failed to qualify for the tournament.

== Teams ==
A total of 18 teams from all 11 OFC member associations were eligible to enter the competition.

- The seven developed associations (Fiji, New Caledonia, New Zealand, Papua New Guinea, Solomon Islands, Tahiti, Vanuatu) would be awarded two berths each in the group stage.
- The four developing associations (American Samoa, Cook Islands, Samoa, Tonga) would be awarded one berth each in the qualifying stage, with the winners and runners-up advancing to the group stage.

Teams from developed associations, originally to enter the group stage
Association	Team	Qualifying method
Fiji	Suva	2020 Fiji Premier League champions
Fiji	Rewa	2020 Fiji Premier League runners-up
New Caledonia	Tiga Sport	2020 New Caledonia Super Ligue champions
New Caledonia	Horizon Patho	2020 New Caledonia Super Ligue runners-up
New Zealand	Auckland City	2019–20 New Zealand Football Championship champions and regular season premiers
New Zealand	Team Wellington	2019–20 New Zealand Football Championship regular season runners-up
Papua New Guinea	Lae City	2019–20 Papua New Guinea National Soccer League champions and regular season premiers
Papua New Guinea	Hekari United	2019–20 Papua New Guinea National Soccer League regular season runners-up
Solomon Islands	Henderson Eels	2020–21 Solomon Islands S-League champions
Solomon Islands	Solomon Warriors	2020–21 Solomon Islands S-League runners-up
Tahiti	Pirae	2019–20 Tahiti Ligue 1 champions
Tahiti	Vénus	2019–20 Tahiti Ligue 1 runners-up
Vanuatu	Galaxy	2020 VFF National Super League champions
Vanuatu	Malampa Revivors	2020 VFF National Super League runners-up

Teams from developing associations, originally to enter the qualifying stage
Association	Team	Qualifying method
American Samoa	Pago Youth	2019 FFAS Senior League champions
Cook Islands	Tupapa Maraerenga	2020 Cook Islands Round Cup champions
Samoa	Lupe o le Soaga	2020 Samoa National League first round winners
Tonga	Veitongo	2019 Tonga Major League champions

Notes

1. American Samoa (ASA): The 2020 FFAS Senior League was cancelled by the Football Federation American Samoa due to the COVID-19 pandemic in American Samoa.
2. New Zealand (NZL): On 18 March 2020, New Zealand Football announced that the 2019–20 New Zealand Football Championship season had been concluded, with the remainder of the regular season and the finals series cancelled, due to the COVID-19 pandemic in New Zealand. Auckland City, who were leading the regular season table, were declared champions and regular season premiers, and qualified for the 2021 OFC Champions League together with Team Wellington, who were at second place in the regular season table.
3. Tahiti (TAH): On 16 May 2020, the Tahitian Football Federation announced that the 2019–20 Tahiti Ligue 1 season had been concluded, with the remainder of the season cancelled, due to the COVID-19 pandemic in French Polynesia. Originally it was decided that the title would not be awarded, and the top three teams of the league table would play in a playoff, where the winners and runners-up would qualify for the 2021 OFC Champions League. However, on 27 May 2020 following new consultation with the clubs, Pirae, who were leading the table, were declared champions, and qualified for the 2021 OFC Champions League together with Vénus, who were at second place.
4. Tonga (TGA): The 2020 Tonga Major League was cancelled by the Tonga Football Association due to the COVID-19 pandemic in Tonga.

== Schedule ==
The tournament would originally be played between January and May 2021, with the qualifying stage scheduled to be played in Samoa in January, and the group stage starting in February. However, the OFC announced on 5 November 2020 that the tournament would begin no earlier than 1 July due to the COVID-19 pandemic. On 4 March 2021, the OFC announced that the tournament would be played before 31 October 2021, and one option was to hold a single, centralised tournament in Fiji in October. However, the tournament was eventually cancelled after a number of options were explored due to border closures throughout the Pacific.

The original schedule of the competition, as planned before the pandemic, was as follows.

Original schedule for 2021 OFC Champions League
Stage	Match dates
Qualifying stage	11–16 January 2021 (Samoa)
Group stage	Group A: 13–21 February 2021; Group B: 13–21 February 2021; Group C: 27 February – 7 March 2021; Group D: 27 February – 7 March 2021
Quarter-finals	3–4 April 2021
Semi-finals	24–25 April 2021
Final	15 May 2021
