= 2007 ASFA Soccer League =

ASFA Soccer League
- Season: 2007
- Champions: Konica
- Matches: 59
- Goals: 415 (7.03 per match)
- Biggest home win: FC SKBC 17-0 Manuula Heat
- Biggest away win: Autali Misasa Katolik 1-17 Tafuna Jets
- Highest scoring: Autali Misasa Katolik 1-17 Tafuna Jets

The 2007 season of the ASFA Soccer League was the twenty seventh season of association football competition in American Samoa. Konica FC won the championship, their second recorded title, with the winners of the 1998 league competition and a number of previous seasons unknown.

== League Setup ==
The league was initially based on two groups of seven teams who played each other on a round robin basis, the top two qualifying for the semi-finals.

=== Group stage ===
==== Pool 1 ====
Pos	Team	Pld	W	D	L	GF	GA	GD	Pts	Qualification
1	Konica (Q)	7	6	1	0	37	5	+32	19	Qualification for semi finals
2	Peace Brothers (Q)	7	5	1	1	46	9	+37	16	Qualification for semi finals
3	FC SKBC (Note: SKBC stands for South Korean Baptist Church)	7	5	1	1	51	15	+36	16	
4	Fagasa CCCAS Youth	7	4	1	2	29	16	+13	13	
5	Manuula Heat	7	2	1	4	10	40	−30	7	
6	Tafuna Jets 2	7	1	1	5	14	37	−23	4	
7	Pago Youth	7	1	1	5	11	48	−37	4	
8	Flame On	7	0	1	6	12	40	−28	1	

Updated to match(es) played on 24 October 2012. Source: American Samoa 2007 from RSSSF.com
Rules for classification: 1) points; 2) goal difference; 3) number of goals scored.
(Q) Qualified for the phase indicated

===== Pool 1 results =====
Home \ Away	FCY	SKB	FLA	KON	MAN	PGY	PEA	TAF2
Fagasa CCCAS Youth				1–7	3–1	2–3	8–0	7–0
FC SKBC	5–5		12–2	3–6	17–0	7–0	2–0	5–2
Flame On FC	0–3 (Note: Match between Flame On and Fagasa CCCAS Youth was awarded 3-0 to Fagasa CCCAS Youth.)			0–6	3–3			1–5
Konica FC					4–0			3–0
Manuula Heat	3–1			1–7		8–0	2–3	7–0
Pago Youth				0–10	1–3			4–4
Peace Brothers				1–1	10–0	13–0		14–1
Tafuna Jets 2					2–3			

Updated to match(es) played on 27 Nov 2008. Source: American Samoa 2007 from RSSSF.com
Pool was played on a round robin basis, results are reported as per RSSSF, hence why some games appear to have played more "home" games than others.
Legend: Blue = home team win; Yellow = draw; Red = away team win.

==== Pool 2 ====
Pos	Team	Pld	W	D	L	GF	GA	GD	Pts	Qualification
1	Tafuna Jets (Q)	7	5	2	0	40	6	+34	17	Qualification for semi finals
2	Pago Eagles (Q)	7	5	1	1	39	8	+31	16	Qualification for semi finals
3	PanSa Men's FC	7	4	1	2	33	9	+24	13	
4	Utulei Youth	7	4	1	2	25	15	+10	13	
5	Konica Airbase	7	4	1	2	19	13	+6	13	
6	Ilaoa and Toomata	7	2	0	5	20	29	−9	6	
7	Autali Misasa Katolik	7	1	0	6	11	56	−45	3	
8	Aua Old School	7	0	0	7	10	61	−51	0	

Updated to match(es) played on 24 October 2012. Source: American Samoa 2007 from RSSSF.com
Rules for classification: 1) points; 2) goal difference; 3) number of goals scored.
(Q) Qualified for the phase indicated

===== Pool 2 results =====
Home \ Away	AUA	AMK	I&T	KAB	PAE	PSM	TAF	UTU
Aua Old School					0–7	2–15		
Autali Misasa Katolik	3–2		3–8	2–4	1–17	0–7	0–13	2–5
Ilaoa and Toomata	10–0				1–7	0–3	1–8	0–3
Konica Airbase	5–2		5–0		0–4	2–1	1–2	2–2
Pago Eagles								
PanSa Men's					1–2			
Tafuna Jets	11–1				2–2	1–1		
Utulei Youth	10–3				3–0 (Note: Game between Uulei Youth and Pago Eagles was awarded 3-0 to Utulei Youth.)	2–5	0–3	

Updated to match(es) played on 27 Nov 2008. Source: American Samoa 2007 from RSSSF.com
Pool was played on a round robin basis, results are reported as per RSSSF, hence why some games appear to have played more "home" games than others.
Legend: Blue = home team win; Yellow = draw; Red = away team win.

=== Semifinals ===
1 December 2007

Konica FC	4-2	Pago Eagles
Unknown	Source	Unknown

Kanana Fou Stadium
1 December 2007

Tafuna Jets	0-1	Peace Brothers
Unknown	Source	Unknown

Kanana Fou Stadium

=== Final ===
8 December 2007

Konica FC	1-0	Peace Brothers
Unknown	Source	Unknown

Pago Park
