= 2014 FFAS Senior League =

FFAS Senior League
- Season: 2014
- Matches: 20
- Goals: 112 (5.6 per match)
- Biggest home win: SKBC 8–1 PanSa
- Biggest away win: PanSa 1–8 SKBC
- Highest scoring: SKBC 8–1 PanSa PanSa 1–8 SKBC

The 2014 season of the FFAS Senior League Division 1 is the thirty-fourth season of association football competition in American Samoa.

== Format ==
Six teams compete in the league. The top team becomes the champion and earns a spot in the 2015–16 OFC Champions League Preliminary Stage. The last place team is relegated to Division 2 while the fifth-place club must play a relegation playoff match against the Division 2 runner up.

== Table ==
Pos	Team	Pld	W	D	L	GF	GA	GD	Pts	Qualification
1	Utulei Youth (C, Q)	8	8	0	0	20	9	+11	24	2015–16 OFC Champions League preliminary stage
2	Lion Heart A	8	6	0	2	25	15	+10	18	
3	SKBC	8	4	0	4	30	15	+15	12	
4	Vaiala Tongan	8	2	0	6	17	21	−4	6	
5	PanSa	8	0	0	8	10	42	−32	0	
–	Tafuna Jets A	0	0	0	0	0	0	0	0	Team withdrawn
–	Pago Youth FC	0	0	0	0	0	0	0	0	Team suspended from competing
–	Taputimu Youth	0	0	0	0	0	0	0	0	Team no longer affiliated to FFAS

Updated to match(es) played on 1 October 2014. Source:
Rules for classification: 1) points; 2) goal difference; 3) number of goals scored.
(C) Champions; (Q) Qualified for the phase indicated
