= 2002 ASFA Soccer League =

ASFA Soccer League
- Season: 2002
- Champions: PanSa Soccer Club

The 2002 season of the ASFA Soccer League was the twenty second season of association football competition in American Samoa.

PanSa Soccer Club won the championship, their third recorded title and third consecutively, with the winners of the 1998 league competition and a number of previous seasons unknown. PanSa lost only one game throughout the whole season and won the league by 8 points from second place team, Utulei FC, although it is unclear how many teams actually took part in the official league as an issue with late registration meant that 14 teams were denied entry to the league for the season. These teams then formed a breakaway league when 60% of their registration fees were withheld by the FFAS in order to pay legal costs. Within this breakaway league, Renegades and Konica Machine were unbeaten, although despite using the same name as the official league, their results are not included in the official history.
