= James Settle =

James Settle may refer to:

- Jimmy Settle (1875-1954), English footballer
- James Settle (footballer) (born 2003), American Samoa footballer, see 2022 OFC U-19 Championship squads
