= 2005 ASFA Soccer League =

FFAS Senior League
- Season: 2005
- Champions: PanSa Soccer Club

The 2005 season of the ASFA Soccer League (now known as the FFAS Senior League) was the twenty fifth season of association football competition in American Samoa. PanSa Soccer Club won the championship, their fourth recorded title, with the winners of the 1998 league competition and a number of previous seasons unknown. It also does not appear that a full competition took place in the prior year, with sources suggesting only youth league took place.

== League setup ==
It appears that this league was the first time since 2001 that all American Samoan clubs were united in one league. Seventeen teams competed in 3 separate pools, from which the top two qualified for a second stage round-robin group to determine the four semi-finalists.

=== Semi-finals ===
5 February 2005

Konica	3–0	Pago Youth
Unknown	Source

5 February 2005

PanSa East FC	Beat	Unknown Team
Unknown	Source	Unknown

=== Final ===
12 February 2005

PanSa East FC	1–0	Konica
Unknown	Source
