= 2018 FFAS Women's National League =

FFAS Women's National League
- Dates: 15 September 2018 – 5 December 2018
- Champions: Ilaoa & To'omata

The 2018 FFAS Women's National League was the fourteenth season of the FFAS Women's National League, the top football league of American Samoa in women's football. The competition began on 15 September 2018 and finished on 5 December 2018. Ilaoa & To'omata won their first league title.

== League table ==
Pos	Team	Pld	W	D	L	GF	GA	GD	Pts	Qualification
1	Taputimu Youth	10	8	1	1	40	8	+32	25	Playoff stage
2	Ilaoa & To'omata	10	7	2	1	23	6	+17	23	Playoff stage
3	Utulei Youth	10	7	1	2	20	5	+15	22	Playoff stage
4	Pago Youth	10	6	2	2	36	11	+25	20	Playoff stage
5	PanSa	10	6	2	2	21	7	+14	20	
6	Royal Puma	10	4	3	3	18	16	+2	15	
7	Vaiala Tongan	10	4	1	5	13	16	−3	13	
8	Green Bay	10	2	3	5	12	17	−5	9	
9	Tafuna Jets	10	2	0	8	9	34	−25	6	
10	Lion Heart	10	1	0	9	5	38	−33	3	Disqualified for forfeiting two matches
11	Black Roses	10	0	1	9	2	31	−29	1	Disqualified for forfeiting two matches

== Playoffs ==
Semi-finals

1 December 2018

Taputimu Youth	1–4	Pago Youth
Filiva'a		Pola (2), Amisone, Vaiomounga

Pago Park Soccer Stadium, Pago Pago
1 December 2018

Ilaoa & To'omata	2–1	Utulei Youth
West-Hunkin (2)		Taumoepeau

Pago Park Soccer Stadium, Pago Pago

Third place playoff

5 December 2018

Utulei Youth	2–0	Taputimu Youth

Pago Park Soccer Stadium, Pago Pago

Final

5 December 2018

Ilaoa & To'omata	1–0	Pago Youth
Faleao 9'	Report

Pago Park Soccer Stadium, Pago Pago
