= 1999 OFC Club Championship =

Tournament details
- Host country: Fiji
- Dates: 18–26 September 1999
- Teams: 9 (from 9 associations)

Final positions
- Champions: (Australia) South Melbourne (1st title)
- Runners-up: (Fiji) Nadi

Tournament statistics
- Matches played: 13
- Goals scored: 99 (7.62 per match)

The 1999 OFC Club Championship was the second season of Oceania's premier club football tournament organised by OFC.

South Melbourne won their first continental title by defeating Nadi 5–1 in the final, which was played at the Prince Charles Park in Nadi, Fiji. As winners, South Melbourne qualified for the 2000 FIFA Club World Championship.

Adelaide City were the defending champions, but did not qualify for the tournament.

== Teams ==
Location of teams of the 1999 OFC Club Championship group stage.
Brown: Group A; Red: Group B; Orange: Group C.

A total of 9 teams from 9 OFC member associations entered the competition.

Association	Team	Qualifying method
Teams entering the group stage
(American Samoa) American Samoa	Konica Machine	1999 ASFA Soccer League champion
Australia	South Melbourne	1998–99 Australian National Soccer League champion
Fiji	Nadi	1998 Fiji Super Premier League champion
(New Zealand) New Zealand	Central United	1999 New Zealand National Final champion
Samoa	Kiwi	1997 Samoa National League champion
(Solomon Islands) Solomon Islands	Malaita Eagles	1999 Solomon Cup champion
(French Polynesia) Tahiti	Vénus	1998–99 Tahiti Ligue 1 champion
Tonga	Lotoha'apai	1999 Tonga Club Championship champion
Vanuatu	Tafea	1999 Vanuatu Port Vila Football League champion

== Schedule ==
Schedule for 1999 OFC Club Championship
Phase	Round	Date
Group stage	Matchday 1	18 September 1999
Group stage	Matchday 2	20 September 1999
Group stage	Matchday 3	22 September 1999
Knockout stage	Semi-finals	24 September 1999
Knockout stage	Third place play-off	26 September 1999
Knockout stage	Final	26 September 1999

== Group stage ==
The nine participants were placed in three groups, where each team played the other teams once. The group winners and best second place team progressed to the semi-finals.

=== Group A ===
Pos	Team	Pld	W	D	L	GF	GA	GD	Pts	Qualification	SOU	MAL	KON
1	(Australia) South Melbourne	2	2	0	0	12	1	+11	6	Advance to knockout stage	—	2–1	10–0
2	(Solomon Islands) Malaita Eagles	2	1	0	1	15	4	+11	3		—	—	14–2
3	(American Samoa) Konica FC	2	0	0	2	2	24	−22	0		—	—	—

Source: RSSSF
18 September 1999
19:00

South Melbourne (Australia)	2–1	(Solomon Islands) Malaita Eagles

Churchill Park, Lautoka

20 September 1999
17:00

Malaita Eagles (Solomon Islands)	14–2	(American Samoa) Konica FC

Churchill Park, Lautoka

22 September 1999
15:30

South Melbourne (Australia)	10–0	(American Samoa) Konica FC

Churchill Park, Lautoka

=== Group B ===
Pos	Team	Pld	W	D	L	GF	GA	GD	Pts	Qualification	ASV	NAD	KIW
1	(French Polynesia) AS Vénus	2	1	1	0	15	2	+13	4	Advance to knockout stage	—	—	14–1
2	(Fiji) Nadi	2	1	1	0	14	1	+13	4	Advance to knockout stage	1–1	—	13–0
3	(Samoa) Kiwi Club	2	0	0	2	1	27	−26	0		—	—	—

Source: RSSSF
18 September 1999
15:00

Nadi (Fiji)	1–1	(French Polynesia) AS Vénus

Prince Charles Park, Nadi

20 September 1999
16:00

Nadi (Fiji)	13–0	(Samoa) Kiwi Club

Prince Charles Park, Nadi

22 September 1999
17:30

AS Vénus (French Polynesia)	14–1	(Samoa) Kiwi Club

Churchill Park, Lautoka

=== Group C ===
Pos	Team	Pld	W	D	L	GF	GA	GD	Pts	Qualification	CEN	TAF	LOT
1	(New Zealand) Central United	2	1	1	0	18	2	+16	4	Advance to knockout stage	—	2–2	16–0
2	(Vanuatu) Tafea	2	1	1	0	12	2	+10	4		—	—	10–0
3	(Tonga) Lotohaʻapai	2	0	0	2	0	26	−26	0		—	—	—

Source: RSSSF
18 September 1999
17:00

Tafea (Vanuatu)	10–0	(Tonga) Lotohaʻapai

Churchill Park, Lautoka

20 September 1999
19:00

Central United (New Zealand)	16–0	(Tonga) Lotohaʻapai

Churchill Park, Lautoka

22 September 1999
19:30

Central United (New Zealand)	2–2	(Vanuatu) Tafea

Churchill Park, Lautoka

=== Ranking of second-placed teams ===
Pos	Grp	Team	Pld	W	D	L	GF	GA	GD	Pts	Qualification
1	B	(Fiji) Nadi	2	1	1	0	14	1	+13	4	Advance to knockout stage
2	C	(Vanuatu) Tafea	2	1	1	0	12	2	+10	4	
3	A	(Solomon Islands) Malaita Kingz	2	1	0	1	15	4	+11	3	

Source: RSSSF

== Knockout stage ==
=== Bracket ===
Semi-finals
24 September – Lautoka
(Australia) South Melbourne	3
(French Polynesia) AS Vénus	0
24 September – Lautoka
(New Zealand) Central United	0
(Fiji) Nadi	1

Final
26 September – Nadi
(Australia) South Melbourne	5
(Fiji) Nadi	1
Third place play-off
26 September – Nadi
(New Zealand) Central United	—
(French Polynesia) AS Vénus	—

=== Semi-finals ===
24 September 1999
17:00

Central United (New Zealand)	0–1	(Fiji) Nadi
	Report	Mamaqa 36'

Churchill Park, Lautoka

24 September 1999
19:00

South Melbourne (Australia)	3–0	(French Polynesia) AS Vénus
Coveny 38'; Liparoti 44'; Trimboli 76'	Report

Churchill Park, Lautoka

=== Third place play-off ===
The third place play-off scheduled on 26 September 1999 was scratched as both sides were unable to field a team due to injuries: this followed in particular the Central United v Tafea group stage match.

26 September 1999
13:30

Central United (New Zealand)	Cancelled	(French Polynesia) AS Vénus
	Report

Prince Charles Park, Nadi

=== Final ===
The final was played on 26 September 1999 at Prince Charles Park in Nadi.

26 September 1999
15:30

South Melbourne (Australia)	5–1	(Fiji) Nadi
Isoifidis 8'; Clarkson 16'; Curcija 47' (pen.); Coveny 50'; Panopoulos 73' (pen.)	Report	Voli 87'

Prince Charles Park, Nadi
Attendance: 10,000
