= 1981 ASFA Soccer League =

FFAS Senior League
- Season: 1981
- Champions: Pago Eagles

The 1981 season of the ASFA Soccer League (now called the FFAS Senior League) was the first season of association football competition in American Samoa. The Pago Eagles won the championship.
