= Pago Youth FC B =

Pago Youth B
- Full name: Pago Youth Football Club B
- Ground: Pago Park Soccer Stadium
- Capacity: 2,000
- League: FFAS Senior League

Pago Youth B is the reserve team for Pago Youth FC, a football team based in Pago Pago, American Samoa. It has played in the country's top division, FFAS Senior League, competing with its own first team.

== History ==
In the last decade, Pago Youth B have competed in the top flight of American Samoa on five occasions - the 2013, 2012, 2011, 2010 and 2009 seasons. In 2011 the B team was separated from the first team at the group stage, but met in the semi-finals.
