= 1982 ASFA Soccer League =

FFAS Senior League
- Season: 1982
- Champions: Pago Eagles

The 1982 season of the ASFA Soccer League (now called the FFAS Senior League) was the second season of association football competition in American Samoa. Pago Eagles won the championship, their second consecutive title.
