= 1992 ASFA Soccer League =

FFAS Senior League
- Season: 1992
- Champions: Nuu'uli FC

The 1992 season of the ASFA Soccer League (now called the FFAS Senior League) was the eleventh season of association football competition in American Samoa. Nuu'uli FC won the championship, their second recorded title, the winners of any of the league competitions held between 1984 and 1991 are unknown.
