= 1997 ASFA Soccer League =

FFAS Senior League
- Season: 1997
- Champions: Pago Eagles

The 1997 season of the ASFA Soccer League (now called the FFAS Senior League) was the seventeenth season of association football competition in American Samoa, and was known as the PYSO Football League. Pago Eagles won the championship, their third recorded title, having led the league by two points with game left to play and with their nearest rivals, Konica Machine with a game in hand. The winners of any of the league competitions held between 1993 and 1996 are unknown.
