= 2003 ASFA Soccer League =

FFAS Senior League
- Season: 2003
- Champions: Manumea FC

The 2003 season of the ASFA Soccer League (now known as the FFAS Senior League) was the twenty third season of association football competition in American Samoa. Manumea FC apparently won the championship, their first recorded title, with the winners of the 1998 league competition and a number of previous seasons unknown, however details of the season are not available and this is derived from a comment made by Prime Minister Tuilaepa Aiono Sailele Malielegaoi that a public holiday would be announced if they won the 2005 OFC Club Championship.
