= 2000 ASFA Soccer League =

FFAS Senior League
- Season: 2000
- Champions: PanSa Soccer Club

The 2000 season of the ASFA Soccer League (now known as the FFAS Senior League) was the twentieth season of association football competition in American Samoa. PanSa Soccer Club shared the championship with Wild Wild West, each their first recorded title, with the winners of the 1998 league competition and a number of previous seasons unknown. PanSa East were able to claim joint first place by beating Konica FC 1–0 on the final day of the season.

== Participating Clubs ==
- Konica Machine FC (Defending Champions)
- PanSa Soccer Club
- Panza West
- Leone Lions
- Renegades
- Utulei FC
- Nu'uuli FC
- Pago Pago FC
