= 1983 ASFA Soccer League =

FFAS Senior League
- Season: 1983
- Champions: Nuu'uli FC

The 1983 season of the ASFA Soccer League (now called the FFAS Soccer League) was the third season of association football competition in American Samoa. Nuu'uli FC won the championship, their first title.
