= 1999 ASFA Soccer League =

FFAS Senior League
- Season: 1999
- Champions: Konica Machine FC
- Oceania Club Championship: Konica Machine FC

The 1999 season of the ASFA Soccer League (now called the FFAS Senior League) was the nineteenth season of association football competition in American Samoa. Konica Machine won the championship, their first recorded title. The winners of the 1998 league competition and a number of previous seasons is unknown. They were the American Samoan representatives in the 1999 Oceania Club Championship.
