= 2001 ASFA Soccer League =

FFAS Senior League
- Season: 2001
- Champions: PanSa Soccer Club

The 2001 season of the ASFA Soccer League (now known as the FFAS Senior League) was the twenty first season of association football competition in American Samoa. PanSa Soccer Club won the championship, their second recorded title, with the winners of the 1998 league competition and a number of previous seasons unknown.
