= SKBC FC =

SKBC
- Full name: Samoan Korean Baptist Church Football Club
- Nickname: The Koreans
- Founded: 2011
- Stadium: Pago Park Soccer Stadium
- Manager: Rishi Prakesh
- League: FFAS Senior League
- 2015: 4th
Home colors	Away colors

SKBC FC, full name Samoa Korean Baptist Church Football Club, is an American Samoan football club.

== Honors ==
- FFAS Senior League: 1

2013.

- FFAS President's Cup: 1

2013.

== Current squad ==
As of 6 October 2014

Note: Flags indicate national team as defined under FIFA eligibility rules; some limited exceptions apply. Players may hold more than one non-FIFA nationality.

No.	Pos.	Nation	Player
1	GK	ASA	Richard Donovan
3	MF	USA	Steven Garcia
4	DF	ASA	Trevor Kaituu
5	DF	ASA	William Fong
7	FW	SOL	Dunstone Aleziru
8	DF	ASA	Neemia Kaleopa
9	MF	ASA	Kaleopa Siligi
10	FW	FIJ	Raynel Krishna

No.	Pos.	Nation	Player
11	MF	ASA	Johnny Sione
12	DF	ASA	Rueben Luvu
13	MF	ASA	Melfi Alsherhri
14	MF		Miguel Diaz
15	DF	SOL	Jerry Kena
16	DF	ASA	Joseph Koroiadi
17	MF	ASA	Sione Lui
18	GK	TGA	Sione Mau
