= Royal Puma FC =

Association football club in American Samoa

Royal Puma
- Full name: Royal Puma Football Club
- Founded: 1991; 35 years ago
- Stadium: Pago Park Soccer Stadium; Pago Pago, American Samoa
- Capacity: 2,000
- League: FFAS Senior League
Home colours	Away colours

Royal Puma is an association football club from Pago Pago, American Samoa. They play in the territory's top division, the FFAS Senior League.

== History ==
Founded in 1991, Royal Puma competed in the FFAS National League by 2016 and finished third in the 2017 season. In 2018, it defeated Pago Youth 4–2 in the opening round and held the FFAS National Cup through several successful defenses before losing it to Tafuna Jets; the club finished sixth in the league.

In 2019, Royal Puma finished second in the regular stage of the FFAS National League and advanced to the championship playoff, where it again finished third. The club returned to the competition in 2021 and finished third, with a record of 10 wins, seven draws and one defeat. In 2022, Royal Puma again finished third, recording 14 wins, four draws and two defeats.

Royal Puma won its first FFAS Senior League title in 2023. They finished third in 2024 and regained the national championship in 2025.

In 2025, Royal Puma made its continental debut in the OFC Men's Champions League qualifying stage in the Cook Islands, losing 4–0 to Vaipuna SC and drawing 3–3 with Tupapa Maraerenga, which left the club third in the group and eliminated.

== Women’s team ==
Royal Puma finished third in the 2016 FFAS Women’s National 9-a-side League, and was the runner-up in that season’s National Cup challenge. In 2017, the club won the FFAS Women’s National League, finishing unbeaten with eight wins and one draw, two points ahead of Vaiala Tongan. Their coach Ruth Tuatoʻo was also appointed to the American Samoa under-16 women’s national team coaching staff for the OFC U-16 Women’s Championship. Royal Puma entered the 2018 season as defending champions but failed to reach the top four and therefore did not qualify for the championship playoffs. In 2022, Royal Puma finished fifth, and it placed fourth in 2023 second in 2024, and third in 2025.

== Honors ==
Men

- FFAS Senior League (1):

2023

Women

- FFAS Women's National League (1):

2017

== International competitions record ==
OFC Men's Champions League results
Season	Round	Club		Home	Away	Aggregate
2025	Preliminary round	(Samoa)	Vaipuna	0–4		3rd
2025	Preliminary round	(Cook Islands)	Tupapa Maraerenga	3–3		3rd
