= Lion Heart FC =

Lion Heart
- Full name: Lion Heart
- Stadium: Pago Park Soccer Stadium; Pago Pago, American Samoa
- Capacity: 2,000
- League: FFAS Senior League
- 2024: 9th
Home colors

Lion Heart is an association football club from Pago Pago, American Samoa. They play in the territory's top division, the FFAS Senior League.

== Squad (2022) ==
Note: Flags indicate national team as defined under FIFA eligibility rules; some limited exceptions apply. Players may hold more than one non-FIFA nationality.

No.	Pos.	Nation	Player
1	GK	ASA	Filipo Lelevaga
2	MF	ASA	Terrence Tia'i
3	DF	ASA	Zak Tagaoa'i
4	MF	ASA	Anthony Tia'i
5	MF	ASA	Elia Kome
6	DF	ASA	Enoka Foluena
7	MF	ASA	Joeyta Setefano
8	DF	ASA	Niko Lelevaga
9	FW	ASA	Masi Foluena
10	FW	ASA	Nelson Moala
11	MF	ASA	Sione Lui

No.	Pos.	Nation	Player
12	MF	ASA	Charmaney Faatupuinati
13	DF	ASA	Lolagi Pesaleli
14	DF	ASA	Uasilaa Heleta
15	GK	ASA	Conrado Siligi
16	MF	ASA	Payton Ale
17	MF	ASA	Tau Kome
18	FW	ASA	Kennedy Taimalie
19	DF	ASA	Fatelika Tuiuli
20	DF	ASA	Charles Uhrle
21	MF	ASA	Kid Bartley
24	DF	ASA	Fa'afetai Fa'afetai
