= Green Bay FC =

- Full name: Green Bay Football Club
- Stadium: Pago Park Soccer Stadium; Pago Pago, American Samoa
- Capacity: 2,000
- League: FFAS Senior League
- 2024: 6th

Green Bay FC is an association football club from Faga'alu, American Samoa.

== Squad (2022) ==
Note: Flags indicate national team as defined under FIFA eligibility rules; some limited exceptions apply. Players may hold more than one non-FIFA nationality.

No.	Pos.	Nation	Player
1	GK	USA	John Shimasaki
2	FW	ASA	Deacon Misi
3	DF	ASA	Sauni Talaga
4	MF	ASA	Poufa Timoteo
5	DF	ASA	Meleke Niko
6	MF	ASA	MJ Kalati
7	MF	ASA	William Hunt
8	MF	ASA	RJ Yarofalir
9	FW	ASA	Felise Faiva
10	MF	ASA	Lamese Moananu

No.	Pos.	Nation	Player
11	MF	ASA	Robert Yarofalir
12	DF	ASA	August Grey
15	DF	ASA	Ipa Masui
16	MF	ASA	Nuumotu Sasala
18	MF	ASA	Livini Afano
20	FW	ASA	Jerome Laupapa
21	GK	ASA	John Ugaitafa
22	DF	ASA	Lupe Faalevao
25	DF	ASA	Kolio Punefu
26	FW	ASA	SJ David Faamaoni
?	DF	ASA	Richard Niko
?	MF	ASA	Nuumotu Sasala
?	MF	ASA	Robert Yarofalir
