= FFAS Senior League =

- Founded: 1976
- Country: American Samoa
- Confederation: OFC
- Number of clubs: 11
- Level on pyramid: 1
- Domestic cup: FFAS President's Cup
- International cup: OFC Champions League
- Current champions: Royal Puma (2025)
- Most championships: Pago Youth (9 titles)
- Top scorer: Johnica Collins (90 goals)
- Current: 2026 FFAS Senior League

FFAS Senior League is the top division of soccer in American Samoa.

In 2009, the last two rounds of the league and the play-offs were cancelled because the only available pitch in Pago Pago was badly damaged in the 2009 Samoa earthquake and tsunami. During the 2010 season, all matches were held at the Kananafou Theological Seminary College Sports Field, as the stadium in Pago Pago was still undergoing repairs.

== Clubs ==
- Black Roses
- Green Bay
- Ilaoa and To'omata
- Lion Heart
- Pago Youth
- PanSa East
- Royal Puma
- Tafuna Jets
- Tupulaga Fagasa
- Utulei Youth
- Vaiala Tonga SC

== Winners ==
Past winners of the league are:

Season	Winner
1976	Tafuna Jets
1977–80	Unknown
1981	Pago Eagles
1982	Pago Eagles
1983	Nuu'uli
1984–91	Unknown
1992	Nuu'uli
1993–96	Unknown
1997	Pago Eagles
1998	Unknown
1999	Konica Machine
2000	PanSa and Wild Wild West (Shared)
2001	PanSa
2002	PanSa
2003	Manumea
2004	Unknown
2005	PanSa
2006	Unknown
2007	Konica FC
2008	Pago Youth
2009	Black Roses
2010	Pago Youth
2011	Pago Youth
2012	Pago Youth
2013	SKBC FC
2014	Utulei Youth
2015	Utulei Youth
2016	Pago Youth
2017	Pago Youth
2018	Pago Youth
2019	Pago Youth
2020	Not held because of COVID-19 pandemic
2021	Vaiala Tongan
2022	Ilaoa and To'omata
2023	Royal Puma
2024	Pago Youth
2025	Royal Puma

== Performances ==
Club	Winners	Winning years
Pago Youth	9	2008, 2010, 2011, 2012, 2016, 2017, 2018, 2019, 2024
PanSa	4	2000†, 2001, 2002, 2005
Pago Eagles	3	1981, 1982, 1997
Royal Puma	2	2023, 2025
Nuu'uli FC	2	1983, 1992
Utulei Youth	2	2014, 2015
Vaiala Tongan	1	2021
SKBC FC	1	2013
Black Roses	1	2009
Konica FC	1	2007
Manumea	1	2003
Wild Wild West	1	2000†
Konica Machine	1	1999
Tafuna Jets	1	1976
Ilaoa and To'omata	1	2022

† Title Shared.

== Statistics ==
=== Top goalscorers ===
Season	Player	Team	Goals	Ref.
2021	(American Samoa) Petu Pouli	Vaiala Tongan	30	
2022	(American Samoa) Tino Vaifale	Iloao and To'omata	31	
2024	(American Samoa) Johnica Collins	Pago Youth	76	

Most goals in single season

- 76 goals
  - Johnica Collins (Pago Youth), 2024 season.

Most goals in single game

- 11 goals
  - Johnica Collins (Pago Youth), 2024 season.

=== All-time goalscorers ===
Rank	Country	Player	Goals
1	(American Samoa)	Johnica Collins	91
2	(American Samoa)	Tino Vaifale	82
3	(American Samoa)	Petu Pouli	75

=== Multiple hat-tricks ===
Rank	Country	Player	Hat-tricks
1	(American Samoa)	Petu Pouli	9
2	(American Samoa)	Johnica Collins	5
2	(American Samoa)	Tia Silao	5
2	(American Samoa)	Tino Vaifale	5
5	(American Samoa)	William Hunt	4
6	(American Samoa)	Neacon Misi	2
6	(American Samoa)	Mark Nilisi	2
6	(American Samoa)	Sefulu Sapatu	2
6	(American Samoa)	Anthony Tia'i	2
6	(American Samoa)	Nofomuli Uitalia	2
6	(American Samoa)	Biljay Vaiotoelau	2

== Women's league ==
=== Top goalscorers ===
Season	Player	Team	Goals
2021	(American Samoa) Elcy Lui	Black Roses	30
2022	(American Samoa) Ama Faleao	Ilaoa and To'omata	41
2023	(American Samoa) Oloa Tofaeono	Pansa	9
2024	(American Samoa) Roseta Ah Siu	Pansa	28

Most goals by a player in a single season

- 41 goals
  - Ama Faleao (2022)

=== All-time goalscorers ===
Rank	Player	Goals	Years
1	Elcy Lui	69	2021–2023
2	Ama Faleao	68	2021–2023
3	Roseta Ah Siu	56	2021–2024

== See also ==
- Football Federation American Samoa
