= Vaiala Tonga SC =

Vaiala Tonga
- Full name: Vaiala Tonga Soccer Club
- Founded: 2011
- Stadium: Pago Park Soccer Stadium
- Capacity: 2,000
- League: FFAS Senior League
- 2024: 5th

Vaiala Tonga SC is an American Samoan association football club currently competing in the FFAS Senior League, the nation's top-division football league. The club also fields youth and futsal sides.

== History ==
Vaiala Tonga represents a small community of Tongans living in Pavaʻiaʻi. The club was admitted as a member of the Football Federation American Samoa at the federation's 2011 annual meeting. The club immediately began playing in the FFAS Senior League for the 2011 season. In the team's first-ever match in the league, it earned a surprise 2–1 victory over Ilaoa and To'omata SC.

Vaiala Tonga won its first league championship in 2021. The club was American Samoa's entrant in the Qualifying Stage of the 2024 OFC Champions League. The team lost its opening match 0–13 against Veitongo FC of Tonga. The next match resulted in a 0–14 defeat to Tupapa Maraerenga F.C. of the Cook Islands in a match that saw four Vaiala Tongan players sent off with red cards. The team closed its qualifying campaign with a 0–14 defeat to Samoa's Vaivase-Tai FC.

== Honors ==
- FFAS Senior League (1):

2021

== Continental record ==
Season	Competition	Round	Club	Home	Away	Aggregate
2024	OFC Champions League	Qualifying Stage	(Tonga) Veitongo	0–13		
2024	OFC Champions League	Qualifying Stage	(Cook Islands) Tupapa Maraerenga	0–14		
2024	OFC Champions League	Qualifying Stage	(Samoa) Vaivase-Tai	0–14		

== Women's team ==
Vaiala Tonga SC fields a successful senior women's side. The team has won American Samoa's senior national women's league, including on three straight occasions in 2015, 2016, and 2017.
