= PanSa East F.C. =

PanSa East
- Full name: Panama-Samoa East Soccer Club
- Nickname: PanSa
- League: FFAS Senior League

Panama-Samoa East FC is an American Samoan ameteur football club from Pago Pago which competes in the ASFA Soccer League. PanSa are four-time winners of the domestic league, making them American Samoa's most successful club along with Pago Youth FC. However, the club struggled to emulate this success in the following years, finishing fourth in both 2008 and 2009 and dropping to fifth in 2010.

== Honors ==
- FFAS Senior League (4):

2000†, 2001, 2002, 2005

† 2000 title shared with Wild Wild West

== Performance in competitions ==
=== 2000-01 Oceania Club Championship ===
PanSa East qualified for the tournament held in Port Moresby, Papua New Guinea by winning their domestic league. PanSa competed in group B which also contained Tafea FC from Vanuatu, AS Venus from French Polynesia, Titavi FC from Samoa and Tupapa Maraerenga FC from the Cook Islands. Unfortunately, PanSa lost all of their four games and finished bottom of the group. However, this does not tell the whole truth of the tournament. In fact, PanSa made a good start to the tournament, drawing 1–1 with AS Venus and thrashing Tupapa FC 4–0. However, the OFC Disciplinary Committee ruled that 7 of PanSa's 18 players were ineligible, and as some of the ineligible players were fielded against Venus and Tupapa, PanSa's opponents were awarded a 2–0 win in both games. PanSa were unable to field a team for the next game against Tafea, so their opponents were again awarded a 2–0 victory.

=== 2002 Samoa Cup ===
The 2002 Samoa Cup involved leading clubs from American Samoa and Western Samoa, as well as invited clubs from across Oceania, including Fiji Flyers from New Zealand. PanSa reached the final where the met Lepea FC of Samoa. Lepea were awarded the win after PanSa were disqualified minutes before kick off as five players on their teamsheet were ineligible and had not been registered with the American Samoa Football Association.

=== 2002 Official Championship ===
PanSa were crowned champions of American Samoa's "Official Championship" after 14 teams rebelled against the ASFA and formed their own "breakaway league". PanSa won the official league, only losing one game in the process, and finished 8 points ahead of their nearest rivals, Utulei. This championship win was PanSa's third consecutive, an impressive feat at any level.

=== 2005 FFAS Senior League ===
After finishing in the top two of their pool, PanSa qualified for the round robin tournament involving the top two teams of each group. After also finishing in the top two of this tournament, PanSa qualified for the championship final, played on 12 February against Konica. PanSa won 1–0 to claim their 4th ASFA senior league title.

=== 2007 FFAS Senior League ===
Position	Club	Games played	Games won	Games drawn	Games lost	Points
1	Tafuno Jets	7	5	2	0	17
2	Pago Eagles	7	5	1	1	16
3	PanSa East	7	4	1	2	13
4	Utulei Youth	7	4	1	2	13
5	Konica Airbase	7	4	1	2	13
6	Ilaoa & Toomata	7	2	0	5	6
7	Autali Misasa Katolik	7	1	0	6	3
8	Aua Old School	7	0	0	7	0

PanSa, Utulei Youth and Konica Airbase all tied for 3rd place in a closely fought league. Had PanSa finished in the top two of their group "Pool 2", they would have qualified for the semi-finals, but the club fell three points short. Notable results included an emphatic 7–0 away win at Autali Misasa Katolik and an incredible 15–2 away victory against relegated Aua Old School on the first day of the season. Things did not get any better for Old School, who proceeded to lose every one of their fixtures in the group.

=== 2008 FFAS Senior League ===
Position	Club	Games played	Games won	Games drawn	Games lost	Points
1	Pago Youth	12	11	1	0	34
2	Black Roses	12	10	0	2	30
3	Renegades	12	10	0	2	30
4	PanSa East	12	8	0	4	24
5	Tafuna Jets	12	8	0	4	24
6	Lion Hearts	12	7	2	3	23
7	Fagasa Youth	12	5	2	5	17
8	Fagatogo	12	5	0	7	15
9	Green Bay	12	4	1	7	13
10	FC SKBU	12	3	0	9	9
11	Peace Brothers	12	2	1	9	7
12	Ilaoa & Toomata	12	1	1	10	4
13	Utulei Youth	12	0	0	12	0

NB: Utulei Youth disqualified

PanSa East finished in joint-fourth place despite losing their first two games of the season. However, the club then won 4 of their next 5 games and clinched a spot in the top-third of the league. PanSa thrashed FC SKBU 12–2 on the 8th matchday, thanks to hat-tricks from Jeremy Adams and Lole Tanuvasa, and also beat Peace Brother 9-0 (thanks to braces from Jeremy Adams and Epa Hunt) and Fagatogo 6–2 in a season that also saw league runners-up Black Roses annihilate strugglers Ilaoa & Toomata 20–0.

=== 2009 FFAS Senior League ===
Position	Club	Games played	Games won	Games drawn	Games lost	Points
1	Black Roses	7	6	0	1	18
2	Ilaoa & Toomata	7	6	0	1	18
3	Pago Youth A	7	5	0	2	15
4	PanSa East	7	4	1	2	13
5	Fagasa Youth	7	4	0	3	12
6	Tafuna Jets	7	3	1	3	10
7	FC SKBC	7	3	0	4	9
8	Green Bay	7	1	0	6	3
9	Utulei Youth	7	1	0	6	3
10	Pago Youth B	7	1	0	6	3

PanSa finished a respectable fourth for the second year running in a tight league. The team's 4 wins included a 1–4 away win over Pago Youth B and a 2–1 victory over eventual champions Black Roses, Roses' only defeat of the season. PanSa held on for the win despite having captain Avele Lalogafuafua sent off with almost half an hour to play, with PanSa goalkeeper Sam Maloata playing well. The season was cut short after a tsunami hit American Samoa and affected areas that some of the league's clubs are based in.

=== 2010 FFAS Senior League ===
Position	Club	Games played	Games won	Games drawn	Games lost	Points
1	Pago Youth A	7	7	0	0	21
2	Vailoatai Youth	7	5	1	1	16
3	FC SKBC	7	4	2	1	14
4	Lion Heart	6	3	1	2	10
5	PanSa East	6	2	0	4	6
6	Lauli'i	6	2	0	4	6
7	Green Bay	7	0	1	6	1
8	Tafuna Jets B	6	0	1	5	1

PanSa East were placed in "Group B", but failed to emulate the previous season's 4th-place finish, despite being in a league with fewer teams. PanSa were hammered 5–0 on the opening day of the season by eventual winners Pago Youth A, but made up for this on the third matchday by winning 7–1 away at Green Bay. PanSa beat Lauli'i 4–0 on the penultimate day of the season to secure 5th place at the expense of their opponents, with Tito Tuimaseve scoring twice. However, PanSa did not play their final game against Tafuna Jets B due to Tafuna being unable to qualify for the knockout stage even if they had won.

By finishing in the top 6 in the league, PanSa qualified for the knockout stage, but were eliminated by Lion Heart FC in the preliminary round.

=== 2010 President's Cup ===
The table below shows PanSa's President's Cup campaign, where they reached the semi-finals and were unlucky to be drawn away from home in all three of their matches. Nissan Penitusi and D'Angelo Herrera scored for PanSa in the first-round game against Tafuna Jets A, while the So'oga Fasia and an own goal helped them to a 4–1 win over Green Bay in the quarter-final. PanSa's opponents in the semi-final, Vailoatai Youth, went on to win the final 3–2 against Lion Heart after extra time.

Round	Opponent	Result
1st Round	Tafuna Jets A (a)	W 1-2
Quarter Final	Green Bay (a)	W 1-4
Semi Final	Vailoatai Youth (a)	L 3-1

Key: (a) = away match, W = victory for PanSa, L = loss for PanSa

=== 2012 FFAS Senior League ===
Changes to the football league structure introduced by the FFAS in August 2012 - including the introduction of a promotion/relegation system - meant that PanSa began the 2012 season in the American Samoan second division for the first time in their history. The club were subsequently confirmed as one of eight teams in the country's second tier by the Oceania Football Confederation on 10 August 2012. The club made a great start to the 2012 season, winning their opening game 4–0 against Ilaoa & To'omata on 11 August 2012.

== Women's team ==
The club came second in the Women's National League 2009, with 13 points from five games. They trailed Black Roses, who won all of their games. The league season was supposed to last 7 rounds but was abandoned after a tsunami that affected the pitches that clubs, such as PanSa, were using and damaged some of the players' homes. PanSa's results in the 2009 season included a huge 19–0 away win over Lion Heart in round 2 and 5-1 wins against Ilaoa & Toomata and Green Bay in rounds 4 and 5 respectively. PanSa women were reigning champions going into the 2009 National League having won the league in 2008 with a game to spare.

However, the 2010 season did not go as well for PanSa Women, with the club lying in 7th place with just two games left to play, and finishing in a disappointing 8th place for the season. The team came fourth of seven teams in Pool A in 2011, amassing nine points. By finishing in the top four, PanSa narrowly qualified for next season's first division. In May 2012, PanSa women's team entered the FFAS 5–a–side league. The club lost its opening game, 13–5 to Jets. They suffered a 2–1 defeat to Pago Youth in their second league match.
