= Ilaoa and To'omata SC =

Ilaoa and To'omata
- Full name: Ilaoa and To'omata Soccer Club
- Stadium: Pago Park Soccer Stadium; Pago Pago, American Samoa
- Capacity: 2,000
- League: FFAS Senior League
- 2024: 4th
Home colors	Away colors

Ilaoa and To'omata is an association football team from Pago Pago, American Samoa. They play in the territory's top division, the FFAS Senior League.

== Honours ==
- FFAS Senior League: 2022, champions

== Continental record ==
Season	Competition	Round	Club	Home	Away	Aggregate
2023	OFC Champions League	PR	(Samoa) Lupe o le Soaga	0–13		4th
2023	OFC Champions League	PR	(Cook Islands) Tupapa Maraerenga	0–8		4th
2023	OFC Champions League	PR	(Tonga) Veitongo	—		4th

== Squad (2022) ==
Note: Flags indicate national team as defined under FIFA eligibility rules; some limited exceptions apply. Players may hold more than one non-FIFA nationality.

No.	Pos.	Nation	Player
1	DF	ASA	Xavior Leatualevao
2	DF	ASA	Isaiah Afisivalu
3	DF	SAM	Piula Taua
4	MF	ASA	Robert Coulter
5	FW	ASA	Tino Vaifale
6	MF	ASA	Ben Tofaeono
7	MF	ASA	Mark Taga'i
8	MF	SAM	Peter Taua
9	DF	ASA	Numia Ta'alefili
10	FW	ASA	Troy Sauiluma
11	MF	ASA	Joseph Koroiadi
12	DF	ASA	Sio Laumoli
13	DF	ASA	Matthew Taga'i

No.	Pos.	Nation	Player
14	MF	ASA	Malofou Leatualevao
15	FW	FIJ	Raynel Krishna
16	DF	ASA	Jaiyah Saelua
17	MF	ASA	Michael Taupau
18	DF	ASA	Darryl Ulufale
19	MF	ASA	Tamati Lilo
20	DF	ASA	Pulemau Faaoloaga
21	GK	ASA	Fa'apaia Eti
22	DF	SAM	Talalelei Faalavaau
23	DF	ASA	Zedi Dovesi
24	MF	ASA	Kuresa Taga'i
25	DF	ASA	Ulysses Lefiti
26	FW	ASA	Mark Faulkner
