= Utulei Youth =

- Full name: Utulei Youth Soccer Team
- Founded: 1996
- Stadium: Pago Park Soccer Stadium; Pago Pago, American Samoa
- Capacity: 2,000
- Chairman: Ioane Evagelia
- Manager: Pita Sinapati
- League: FFAS Senior League
Home colors	Away colors

Utulei Youth is an association football club from Pago Pago in American Samoa. They play in the territory's top division, the FFAS Senior League. They have won the domestic league championship twice, in 2014 (a perfect season) and 2015, and the domestic cup in 2014.

== History ==
Utulei Youth was founded in 1996 by Rev. Ioane Evagelia, who serves as both the president and the coach of the club. Early in their history, they participated in 5 and 7-a-side games, but they now play in the 11-a-side FFAS National League. In addition to league play, the team also competes in American Samoa's domestic cup, the FFAS President's Cup.

Utulei finished the 2012 season in third, taking 27 points from 14 games. They finished the 2013 season in fifth place, having taken seven points from seven games.

The club won its first major honors in 2014, when it had a perfect season, winning all eight of their games and taking the 2014 FFAS Senior League championship. Conrado Kaleopa and Iotamo Lameta were the goalscorers in the final game of the season, a 2–1 victory over Lion Heart, which would finish second in the league. Utulei Youth finished with a +11 goal difference and six points ahead of Lion Heart; Lion Heart would have won the league with a victory in the last game. Utulei Youth also won American Samoa's annual knockout tournament, the FFAS President's Cup, again with a 2–1 victory over Lion Heart. Ryan Samuelu scored one goal for Utulei and caused the other, a Lion Heart own goal. The Utulei Youth women's team also won in the national league in 2014, and came in second in the President's Cup, behind PanSa. As the winner of the 2014 league season, Utulei qualified for the 2016 OFC Champions League, entering in a four team preliminary round for a position in the group stages.

In 2015, Utulei Youth again won their domestic league, again six points ahead of second place Lion Heart. With their second consecutive league title, they will become the second team (after 2012 and 2013 league winners Pago Youth) to represent American Samoa at the OFC Champions League for two years in a row. The Utulei Youth women's team also won their league, and again came in second to PanSa in the President's Cup.

== Honors ==
- FFAS Senior League: 2

2014, 2015

- FFAS President's Cup: 3

2014, 2015, 2016

== Oceania record ==
=== Summary ===
Competition	Pld	W	D	L	GF	GA	Last season played
OFC Champions League	6	1	0	5	11	27	2017

=== By season ===
Season	Competition	Round	Opponent	Neutral
2016	OFC Champions League 2016	R1	(Samoa) Kiwi	2-6
2016	OFC Champions League 2016	R1	(Tonga) Veitongo	3-2
2016	OFC Champions League 2016	R1	(Cook Islands) Tupapa Maraerenga	1-9
2017	OFC Champions League 2017	R1	(Samoa) Lupe o le Soaga	3-4
2017	OFC Champions League 2017	R1	(Tonga) Veitongo	1-3
2017	OFC Champions League 2017	R1	(Cook Islands) Puaikura	1-3
