= Black Roses FC =

Black Roses
- Full name: Black Roses
- Stadium: Pago Park Soccer Stadium
- Capacity: 2,000
- League: FFAS Senior League
- 2024: 11th
Home colors	Away colors

The Black Roses FC is a football club based in American Samoa. The Black Roses play in the FFAS Senior League, the top flight of American Samoan football. The club has won one title, the FFAS Senior League 2009.

== Squad (2002) ==
Note: Flags indicate national team as defined under FIFA eligibility rules; some limited exceptions apply. Players may hold more than one non-FIFA nationality.

No.	Pos.	Nation	Player
1	GK	ASA	Taume Siaosi
4	DF	ASA	Tauva'a Moleli
5	FW	ASA	Pulenuu Fono
6	FW	ASA	Junior Lealuga
7	MF	ASA	Emanuel Misi
8	DF	ASA	Patrick Kuresa
9	DF	ASA	Pedro Kuresa
10	MF	ASA	Robert Ieremia
11	MF	ASA	Ilalio Sefika
12	FW	ASA	Jacob McMoore

No.	Pos.	Nation	Player
13	DF	ASA	Charles Leleua
14	MF	ASA	Pago Isu
15	DF	ASA	Soane Samoa
18	DF	ASA	Richard Ieremia
21	GK	ASA	Hamo Tili
22	MF	ASA	Sisavai'i Pula
24	MF	ASA	Joe McMoore
26	FW	ASA	Jamel Jualo
27	DF	ASA	Ken Leaupepe

== Titles ==
- FFAS Senior League (1):

2009
