= Tafuna Jets =

- Founded: 1987
- Stadium: Pago Park Soccer Stadium; Pago Pago, American Samoa
- Capacity: 2,000
- League: FFAS Senior League
- 2024: 7th
Home colors

Tafuna Jets is an association football team from Pago Pago, American Samoa. They play in the territory's top division, the FFAS Senior League.

== Squad (2022) ==
Note: Flags indicate national team as defined under FIFA eligibility rules; some limited exceptions apply. Players may hold more than one non-FIFA nationality.

No.	Pos.	Nation	Player
1	GK	ASA	Timoteo Samuelu
2	DF	ASA	Chris Seleni
3	FW	ASA	Rex Iose
4	GK	ASA	Alex Mae'e
5	MF	ASA	Sekone Faaoga
6	DF	ASA	Bryman Levaula
7	FW	ASA	Sonny Chen
8	MF	ASA	Satunu Tautali
9	FW	ASA	Joape Ruanaivalu
10	MF	ASA	TJ Levaula
11	FW	ASA	Felise Faaliga
12	MF	ASA	Martin Latuivai
13	DF	ASA	Petaia Saunoa

No.	Pos.	Nation	Player
14	DF	ASA	Patrick Mataipule
16	MF	ASA	Mataio Sue
17	FW	ASA	Robert Lamanna
18	DF	ASA	Ryan Faasipa
19	MF	ASA	Asaeli Baleirotuma
20	DF	ASA	Anthony Savaiinaea
21	FW	ASA	Isaac Alosio
23	DF	ASA	Mike Sefo
28	MF	ASA	Siuta Aloali'i
30	MF	ASA	Josaia Tokomaimaleya
31	DF	ASA	Eteuati Faaliga
33	FW	ASA	AJ Alosio
99	FW	ASA	Shalom Luani
