= Pago Park Soccer Stadium =

Soccer stadium in American Samoa

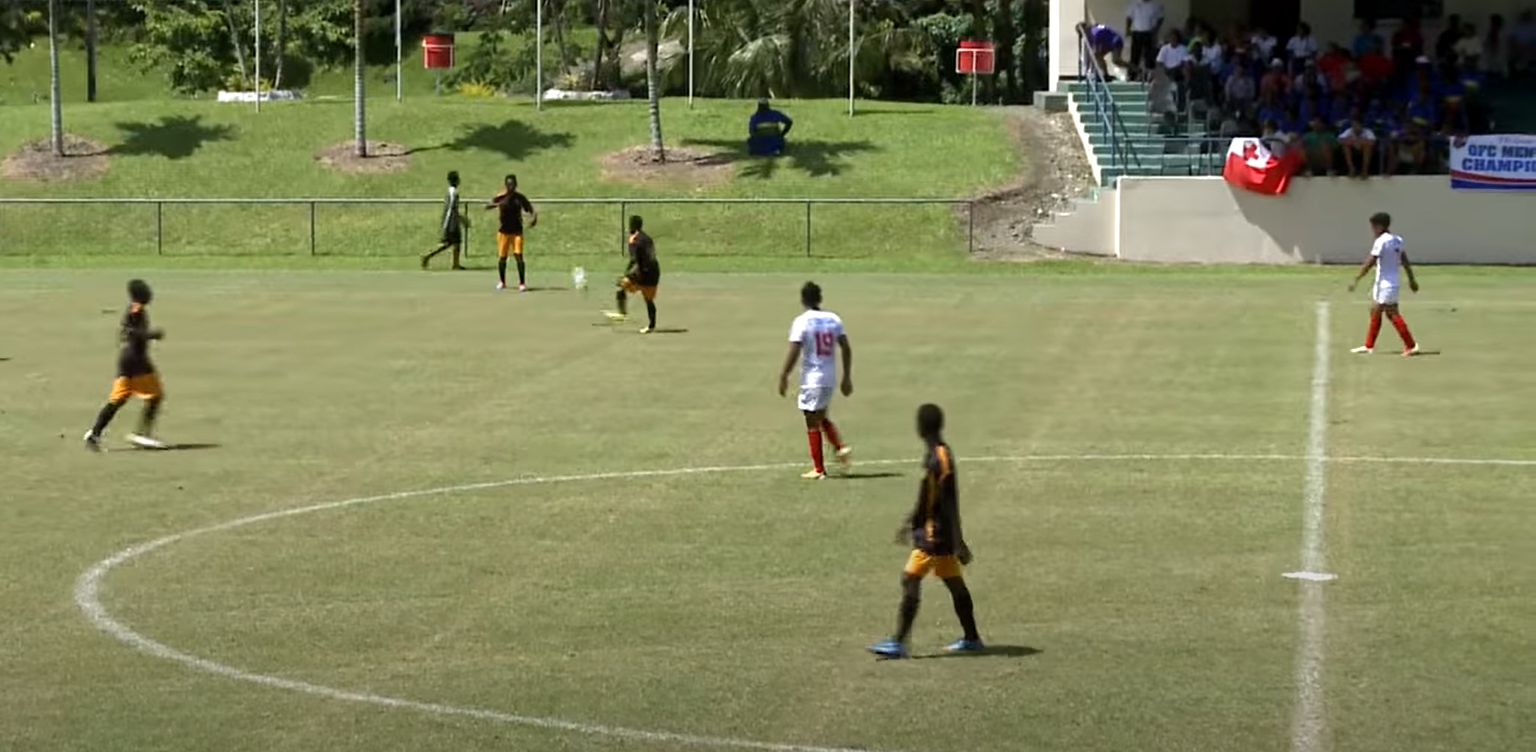
- Pago Park Soccer Stadium in 2015
- Interactive map of Pago Park Soccer Stadium
- Location: Pago Pago Park; Pago Pago, Eastern District 96799; American Samoa
- Coordinates: 14.2718°S 170.7010°W
- Owner: Kananafou Theological Seminary
- Capacity: 2,000

Pago Park Soccer Stadium is a soccer stadium in Pago Pago, American Samoa. The capacity is 2,000.

The stadium is the home ground of the American Samoa national football team. It featured in the highly rated 2014 film Next Goal Wins, which documents the team's attempt to achieve their first-ever international win. The stadium is shown to be the team's training ground in the build-up to the 2011 Pacific Games and the 2014 World Cup Qualifiers.

== Stands ==
The stadium has one small covered stand on the north side of the pitch, which is in-line with the half-way line.

== Club football ==
The stadium is used for all games in the FFAS Senior League, the top-tier of American Samoan football. It has been used to host the OFC Champions League matches.

== 2009 tsunami ==
The FIFA Goal Project had enabled a new pitch and new administration offices to be constructed in 2007, but the stadium was severely damaged by a tsunami in 2009. After undergoing a rebuilding project, the stadium was re-opened by FIFA President Sepp Blatter in a ceremony in January 2011.
