= Football Federation American Samoa =

Governing body for soccer in American Samoa

OFC
- Short name: FFAS
- Founded: 1984 (2007 as FFAS)
- Headquarters: Pago Pago
- FIFA affiliation: 1998
- OFC affiliation: 1998
- President: Iuili Alex Godinet
- Website: www.ffas.as

Football Federation American Samoa (FFAS) is the governing body for competitive soccer in American Samoa.

== History ==
It came into existence following inaugural elections held in late 2007. The new general secretariat took office under newly elected FFAS President Iuli Alex Godinet in the first elections for the national body since 2005. Previously its name was the American Samoa Football Association.

Godinet headed off four other candidates in the race for the top job that included Pou Supapo, Tony Langkilde, Malia Perelini and Maselino Tautu.

== National football team ==
American Samoa's men's national team and women's national team have struggled on the pitch since they were admitted to the Oceania Football Confederation (OFC) in 1998; including a 31–0 defeat against Australia in a World Cup qualifying match for the men and a 21–0 defeat against the same opposition for the women.

American Samoa's men are currently ranked 188th (Prev 204th (November 2011) in the FIFA world rankings and the women are ranked 142nd (as August 2022). This was due to recent results and American Samoa's first competitive victory against Tonga by 2 goals to 1 on 23 November 2011. There is hope for the territory with the completion of work on the Pago Stadium Goal Project that was inaugurated prior to the XIII South Pacific Games - Samoa 2007 under the watchful eyes of former FIFA World Cup winner and OFC Player of the Year Christian Karembeu.

Senior eleven-a-side competition for both men and women recommenced in 2007 with Konica FC winning the men's title after a 4–2 victory over Peace Brothers.

== Domestic football ==
The FFAS also organizes the island's football leagues, the FFAS Senior League, which began in 1981, and the FFAS Women's National League, which began around 1987. Pago Youth are the most successful men's team and Black Roses are the most successful women's team in American Samoa. The winners of the men's league used to qualify for the preliminary rounds of the OFC Champions League up until the 2019 pandemic cancelled the tournaments. They also organize the FFAS President's Cup, the men's national cup.

The 2023 FFAS National League kicked off on 6 August 2023 in Pago Pago with the Men's Division, Women's Division, Men's Division Cup and Women's Division Cup.

The 10 teams involved in the 2023 FFAS National League (Men's) are Royal Puma, Black Roses, Utulei Youth, Ilona & To'omata, Tafuna Jets, Vaiala Tonga, PanSa, Lion Heart, Green Bay, Pago Youth.

The 10 teams involved in the 2023 FFAS National League (Women's) are Royal Puma, Black Roses, Utulei Youth, Ilona & To'omata, Tafuna Jets, Vaiala Tonga, PanSa, Lion Heart, Green Bay, Pago Youth.
