= Pago Youth FC =

Pago Youth
- Full name: Pago Youth Football Club
- Nickname: The Youth
- Stadium: Pago Park Soccer Stadium
- Capacity: 2,000
- Manager: Paul Ualesi
- League: FFAS Senior League
- 2024: Champions
Home colors	Away colors

Pago Youth is an American Samoan professional football club located in Pago Pago. It currently plays in the FFAS Senior League, the nation's top-division football league, and has won it eight times, being the most successful club in American Samoa.

== Honors ==
FFAS Senior League

- Champions (9): 2008, 2010, 2011, 2012, 2016, 2017, 2018, 2019, 2024

== Continental record ==
Season	Competition	Round	Club	Home	Away	Aggregate
2012–13	OFC Champions League	PR	(Samoa) Kiwi	1–5		4th
2012–13	OFC Champions League	PR	(Tonga) Lotohaʻapai United	0–6		4th
2012–13	OFC Champions League	PR	(Cook Islands) Tupapa Maraerenga	0–9		4th
2013–14	OFC Champions League	PR	(Samoa) Kiwi	1–5		4th
2013–14	OFC Champions League	PR	(Cook Islands) Tupapa Maraerenga	1–11		4th
2013–14	OFC Champions League	PR	(Tonga) Lotohaʻapai United	Cancelled		4th
2018	OFC Champions League	PR	(Tonga) Veitongo	1–1		4th
2018	OFC Champions League	PR	(Samoa) Lupe o le Soaga SC	1–13		4th
2018	OFC Champions League	PR	(Cook Islands) Tupapa Maraerenga	0–5		4th
2019	OFC Champions League	PR	(Tonga) Lotohaʻapai United	1–5		4th
2019	OFC Champions League	PR	(Samoa) Kiwi	3–4		4th
2019	OFC Champions League	PR	(Cook Islands) Tupapa Maraerenga	1–2		4th
2026	OFC Champions League	PR	(Samoa) Vaivase-Tai	1–1		3rd
2026	OFC Champions League	PR	(Tonga) Nukuhetulu	2–2		3rd
2026	OFC Champions League	PR	(Cook Islands) Tupapa Maraerenga	0–3		3rd

== Reserve team ==
Pago Youth has a reserve team Pago Youth B.

== See also ==
- 2026 OFC Men's Champions League qualifying stage
