= 2016–17 Campeonato Nacional da Guiné-Bissau =

Campeonato Nacional da Guiné-Bissau
- Season: 2016–17
- Champions: Sport Bissau e Benfica
- Relegated: Tigres de São Domingos; Mavegro; Estrela de Cantanhez

The 2016–17 Campeonato Nacional da Guiné-Bissau season was the top level of football national competition in Campeonato Nacional da Guiné-Bissau in Guinea-Bissau. It began on 10 September 2016 and concluded on 21 May 2017.

== Standings ==
Pos	Team	Pld	W	D	L	GF	GA	GD	Pts	Qualification or relegation
1	Benfica de Bissau (C)	26	19	5	2	58	18	+40	62	Champions
2	Nuno Tristão	26	13	10	3	22	10	+12	49	
3	Cuntum	26	12	7	7	36	29	+7	43	
4	Sporting de Bafatá	26	12	7	7	32	20	+12	43	
5	Lagartos de Bambadinca	26	9	10	7	35	37	−2	37	
6	Internacional	26	9	7	10	35	32	+3	34	
7	Portos de Bissau	26	8	10	8	27	31	−4	34	
8	Pelundo	26	8	9	9	31	27	+4	33	
9	Os Balantas	26	7	11	8	27	28	−1	32	
10	Canchungo	26	7	9	10	26	29	−3	30	
11	Sporting da Guiné-Bissau	26	8	3	15	21	36	−15	27	
12	Tigres de São Domingos (R)	26	7	6	13	29	34	−5	27	Relegation
13	Mavegro (R)	26	7	2	17	22	44	−22	23	Relegation
14	Estrela de Cantanhez (R)	26	4	8	14	26	52	−26	20	Relegation

Updated to match(es) played on unknown. Source: RSSSF
(C) Champions; (R) Relegated
