= 2018–19 Campeonato Nacional da Guiné-Bissau =

Campeonato Nacional da Guiné-Bissau
- Season: 2018–19
- Champions: Internacional
- Relegated: Lagartos de Bambadinca; Desportivo de Farim
- Matches played: 182
- Goals scored: 366 (2.01 per match)

The 2018–19 Campeonato Nacional da Guiné-Bissau is the 42nd season (since independence) of the Campeonato Nacional da Guiné-Bissau, the top-tier football league in Guinea-Bissau. The season started on 22 December 2018. Several clubs play home games at the 20,000-capacity Estádio 24 de Setembro.

== Standings ==
Pos	Team	Pld	W	D	L	GF	GA	GD	Pts	Qualification or relegation
1	Internacional (C)	26	17	3	6	38	22	+16	54	Champions
2	Nuno Tristão	26	13	8	5	33	20	+13	47	
3	Sporting de Bafatá	26	13	4	9	28	27	+1	43	
4	Sporting de Bissau	26	11	10	5	31	14	+17	43	
5	Cuntum	26	12	6	8	28	19	+9	42	
6	Benfica	26	12	5	9	32	17	+15	41	
7	Os Balantas	26	9	9	8	21	24	−3	36	
8	Flamengo FC	26	8	11	7	21	26	−5	35	
9	Portos	26	9	6	11	35	33	+2	33	
10	Pelundo	26	8	5	13	25	26	−1	29	
11	Desportivo de Gabú	26	5	11	10	21	30	−9	26	
12	Atlético de Bissorã	26	6	7	13	14	25	−11	25	
13	Lagartos de Bambadinca (R)	26	5	9	12	23	38	−15	24	Relegation
14	Desportivo de Farim (R)	26	3	8	15	16	45	−29	17	Relegation

(C) Champions; (R) Relegated
