= 2017–18 Campeonato Nacional da Guiné-Bissau =

Campeonato Nacional da Guiné-Bissau
- Season: 2017–18
- Champions: Benfica de Bissau
- Relegated: Canchungo; Sonaco (disqualified)
- Matches played: 156
- Goals scored: 380 (2.44 per match)

The 2017–18 Campeonato Nacional da Guiné-Bissau season is the 41st edition (since independence) of the top level of football competition in Guinea-Bissau. It began on 25 November 2017 and ended on 18 June 2018.

== Standings ==
Pos	Team	Pld	W	D	L	GF	GA	GD	Pts	Qualification or relegation
1	Benfica (C)	24	14	7	3	38	19	+19	49	Champions
2	Internacional	24	14	7	3	37	16	+21	49	
3	Pelundo	24	10	6	8	23	27	−4	36	
4	Nuno Tristão	24	9	8	7	33	26	+7	35	
5	Portos	24	8	10	6	25	22	+3	34	
6	Cuntum	24	7	10	7	25	24	+1	31	
7	Os Balantas	24	7	9	8	24	26	−2	30	
8	Sporting de Bissau	24	7	7	10	28	33	−5	28	
9	Lagartos de Bambadinca	24	6	9	9	24	27	−3	27	
10	Desportivo de Farim	24	6	8	10	23	30	−7	26	
11	Flamengo	24	6	7	11	22	30	−8	25	
12	Sporting de Bafatá	24	6	6	12	21	30	−9	24	
13	Canchungo (R)	24	6	6	12	17	30	−13	24	Relegation
14	Sonaco (Note: Sonaco were disqualified due to two consecutive no shows) (D)	0	0	0	0	0	0	0	0	Disqualified

(C) Champions; (D) Disqualified; (R) Relegated

== See also ==
- 2018 Taça Nacional da Guiné Bissau
