= 2003–04 First Division (Guinea-Bissau) =

First Division
- Season: 2003–04
- Champions: Sporting de Bissau
- Relegated: Flamengo; Bijagos (Disqualified); Internacional (Disqualified)
- Matches: 162
- Goals: 227 (1.4 per match)

The 2003–04 First Division season was the 26th of the amateur competition of the first-tier football in Guinea-Bissau. The tournament was organized by the Football Federation of Guinea-Bissau. The season began on 27 December 2003 and finished on 17 June 2004, this was their next in two years. Sporting de Bissau won their eleventh title and finished with 39 points and to financial reasons did not qualify and competed in the 2005 CAF Champions League the following season. Mavegro won the 2004 Guinea-Bissau Cup and did not participate in the 2005 CAF Confederation Cup the following season also to financial concerns.

Originally a 22 match season and would be 232 matches, instead as Bijagos and Internacional withdrew and were excluded, and 18 match season took place and thus relegated to the second division in the following season. Flamengo was last place with 13 points and the only club who competed relegated.

Internacional was the defending team of the title. Sporting de Bissau finished with 39 points. Atlético Bissorã scored the most goals numbering 28.

== Participating clubs ==
- Sporting Clube de Bissau
- Bula Futebol Clube - Promoted from the Second Division
- União Desportiva Internacional
- Sport Bissau e Benfica
- Atlético Clube de Bissorã
- Futebol Clube de Bijagos
- Sporting Clube de Bafatá
- Futebol Clube de Canchungo
- Mavegro Futebol Clube
- Flamengo Futebol Clube
- Estrela Negra de Bolama - Promoted from the Second Division
- CF Os Balantas

== Overview ==
The league was contested by 10 teams with Sporting de Bissau winning the championship.

== League standings ==
Pos	Team	Pld	W	D	L	GF	GA	GD	Pts	Qualification or relegation
1	Sporting de Bissau (C)	18	12	3	3	26	7	+19	39	Champions
2	Benfica	18	8	4	6	29	21	+8	28	
3	Mavegro	18	8	4	6	16	18	−2	28	
4	Canchungo	18	6	9	3	26	18	+8	27	
5	Os Balantas	18	7	5	6	21	21	0	26	
6	Sporting Bafatá	18	6	7	5	19	17	+2	25	
7	Atlético de Bissorã	18	6	5	7	28	31	−3	23	
8	Bula	18	5	5	8	20	22	−2	20	
9	Estrela Negra de Bolama	18	4	4	10	24	37	−13	16	
10	Flamengo (R)	18	3	4	11	18	35	−17	13	Relegation
11	Bijagos (Note: Bijagós were disqualified due to two consecutive no shows) (D)	0	0	0	0	0	0	0	0	Disqualified
12	Internacional (Note: Internacional were disqualified due to two consecutive no shows) (D)	0	0	0	0	0	0	0	0	Disqualified

Source: RSSSF
(C) Champions; (D) Disqualified; (R) Relegated
Notes:

First Division 2003-04
Champions
Sporting de Bissau
11th title

== See also ==
- Campeonato Nacional da Guiné-Bissau
