= Football in Guinea-Bissau =

- Governing body: Football Federation of Guinea-Bissau
- National team: Men's national team

International competitions
- CAF Champions League; CAF Confederation Cup; CAF Super Cup; FIFA Club World Cup; FIFA World Cup (national team); Africa Cup of Nations (national team)

The sport of football in the country of Guinea-Bissau is run by the Football Federation of Guinea-Bissau. The association administers the national football team, as well as the national league. Association football (soccer) is the most popular sport in the country. Since the Portuguese navigator Nuno Tristão reached the local coast in 1446, but at the latest since the official foundation of the colony Bissau in 1753, the country was a Portuguese colony, and became officially independent only in 1975. To this day, football in Guinea-Bissau is therefore characterized by its Portuguese origins and relationships, for example through a number of affiliates of the Portuguese clubs Sporting CP and Benfica. Also, many Guinea-Bissau footballers play in Portugal.

== Domestic football ==
Since 1975 the FFGB organizes the national championship, the Campeonato Nacional da Guiné-Bissau. Record champion, with 13 titles is Sporting Clube de Bissau, founded in 1936 and the 89th affiliate of the Portuguese club Sporting Lisbon. In 2014, the title went to the first Nuno Tristão FC from Bula in the Cacheu region.

The national trophy of the FFGB, the Taça Nacional da Guiné-Bissau has been played since 1977. The first winner was União Desportiva Internacional from Bissau, who won the cup six times (as of December 2014). The club is thus record winner of the cup competition, on par with Sport Bissau e Benfica, a subsidiary of the Portuguese club Benfica Lisbon. In 2014 won the second-class Futebol Clube de Canchungo from Canchungo surprisingly. In the following Supertaça, the Supercup against champions Nuno Tristão FC, the club was defeated on 27 December 2014 only on penalties with 2: 3.

So far, no club from Guinea Bissau for the CAF Champions League or the CAF Confederation Cup could qualify.

== League system ==
Level	League(s)/Division(s)
1	Primeira Divisão; 10 clubs
	↓↑ 2 clubs
2	Segunda Divisão; 12 clubs divided in 2 series of 6
	↓↑ 2 clubs
3	Terceira Divisão; 14 clubs divided in 2 series of 7

== National team ==
The Guinea-Bissau national football team has been participating in FIFA tournaments since 1986. So far, they have qualified for the World Cup finals. Guinea-Bissau qualified for the Africa Cup of Nations for the first time in 2017.

Guinea-Bissau has participated several times in the West African Amílcar Cabral Cup, hosting it in 1979, 1988 and 2007 but failed to win any.

In December 2014, Guinea-Bissau finished 133rd in the FIFA World Ranking, their highest FIFA ranking was in July 1994 when they were ranked 115 while their lowest was in February 2010 when they were placed 195.

Since 2017, Baciro Candé have been coaching the national team of Guinea-Bissau.

== Women's football ==
The women's Guinea-Bissau national football team has been on two occasions for qualifying for the Women's Africa Cup of Nations in 2002 and 2014, but the FFGB withdrew both times.

== Football stadiums ==
Stadium	City	Tenants	Capacity	Image
Estádio 24 de Setembro	Bissau	Guinea-Bissau national football team, Benfica Bissau, Sporting Bissau, Inter Bissau and Portos de Bissau.	20,000	
Estádio Lino Correia	Bissau	Estrela Negra de Bissau	12,000	

== See also ==
- Lists of stadiums
