= Romão dos Santos =

Bissau-Guinean footballer (1967–2024)

Personal information
- Full name: Romão António dos Santos
- Date of birth: 24 August 1967
- Place of birth: Bula, Guinea-Bissau
- Date of death: 14 March 2024 (aged 56)
- Place of death: Guinea-Bissau
- Position: Midfielder

Senior career*
Years	Team	Apps	(Gls)
–1987	Nuno Tristão FC		
1987–1988	Sport Bissau e Benfica		
1988–1992	Amarante		
1992–1996	Lusitano de Évora		

Managerial career
- 2000–2003: Guinea-Bissau U17
- 2004–2005: Sport Bissau e Benfica
- 2005–2006: Sporting de Bissau
- 2006–2008: Nuno Tristão FC
- 2010–2012: Guinea-Bissau
- 2012–2013: Sporting de Bissau
- 2014–2016: Sport Bissau e Benfica
- 2016: Guinea-Bissau (assistant)
- * Club domestic league appearances and goals

Romão António dos Santos (24 August 1967 – 14 March 2024) was a Bissau-Guinean football manager and player. He played as a midfielder.

== Life and career ==
Dos Santos was born on 24 August 1967 in Bula, Guinea-Bissau. He was a native of Bula, Guinea-Bissau. He started his career with Bissau-Guinean side Nuno Tristão FC. He debuted for the club at the age of fifteen. He captained them. In 1988, he signed for Bissau-Guinean side Sport Bissau e Benfica. In 1988, he signed for Portuguese side Amarante. He captained the club. In 1992, he signed for Portuguese side Lusitano de Évora. He captained the club. He started his managerial career in Portugal. In 2000, he was appointed manager of the Guinea-Bissau under-17 national team. In 2004, he was appointed manager of Bissau-Guinean side Sport Bissau e Benfica. He helped the club win the league.

In 2005, he was appointed manager of Bissau-Guinean side Sporting de Bissau. In 2006, he was appointed manager of Bissau-Guinean side Nuno Tristão FC. In 2010, he was appointed manager of the Guinea-Bissau senior football team. In 2012, he returned as manager of Bissau-Guinean side Sporting de Bissau. In 2014, he was appointed manager of Bissau-Guinean side Sport Bissau e Benfica. In 2016, he returned as an assistant manager to the Guinea-Bissau national football team. He helped the Guinea-Bissau national football team achieve qualification to the 2017 Africa Cup of Nations. He was described as a "prominent coach who left his mark on the development of football both at Sport Bissau e Benfica and at Sporting Clube de Guiné-Bissau".

== Death ==
He died on 14 March 2024 in Guinea-Bissau.
