= Fanfali =

Bissau-Guinean footballer (1962–2026)

Personal information
- Full name: Infali Injai
- Date of birth: 10 September 1962
- Place of birth: Bissau, Guinea-Bissau
- Date of death: 3 January 2026 (aged 63)
- Positions: Midfielder; defender

Senior career*
Years	Team	Apps	(Gls)
1983–1985	UDI de Bissau		
1985–1986	Felgueiras	1	(0)
1986–1987	Vila Real		
1987–1988	Mangualde	25	(0)
1988–1989	Os Marialvas	2	(1)
1989–1990	Académico de Viseu	35	(7)
1990–1991	Penafiel	2	(0)
1991–1992	Sanjoanense	4	(0)
1992–1994	Mangualde		
1994–1995	Paços de Brandão		
1995–1996	SC Régua		
1996–1997	Oliveira do Hospital		

International career
1989	Guinea-Bissau	1	(0)
- * Club domestic league appearances and goals

Infali Injai (10 September 1962 – 3 January 2026), commonly known as Fanfali, was a Bissau-Guinean footballer who played as a midfielder and defender.

== Career ==
Fanfali began his career in Guinea-Bissau with União Desportiva Internacional de Bissau, where he scored in the 1984 Taça Nacional da Guiné Bissau final. In 1985, he moved to Portugal, where he signed for Felgueiras. He primarily spent the next few years in the second division of Portugal, notably scoring 7 goals in 35 matches during the 1989–90 Segunda Divisão season, which earned him a move to Primeira Divisão side Penafiel. There, he made two appearances during the 1990–91 season, before returning to the lower divisions of Portugal, retiring in 1997.

In 1989, he made one appearance for the Guinea-Bissau national team in 0–0 draw against Senegal at the 1989 Amílcar Cabral Cup.

== Personal life and death ==
His daughter, Mariama, is a social entrepreneur. Fanfali died on 3 January 2026, at the age of 63.
