= 24 September Stadium =

Multi-purpose stadium in Bissau, Guinea-Bissau

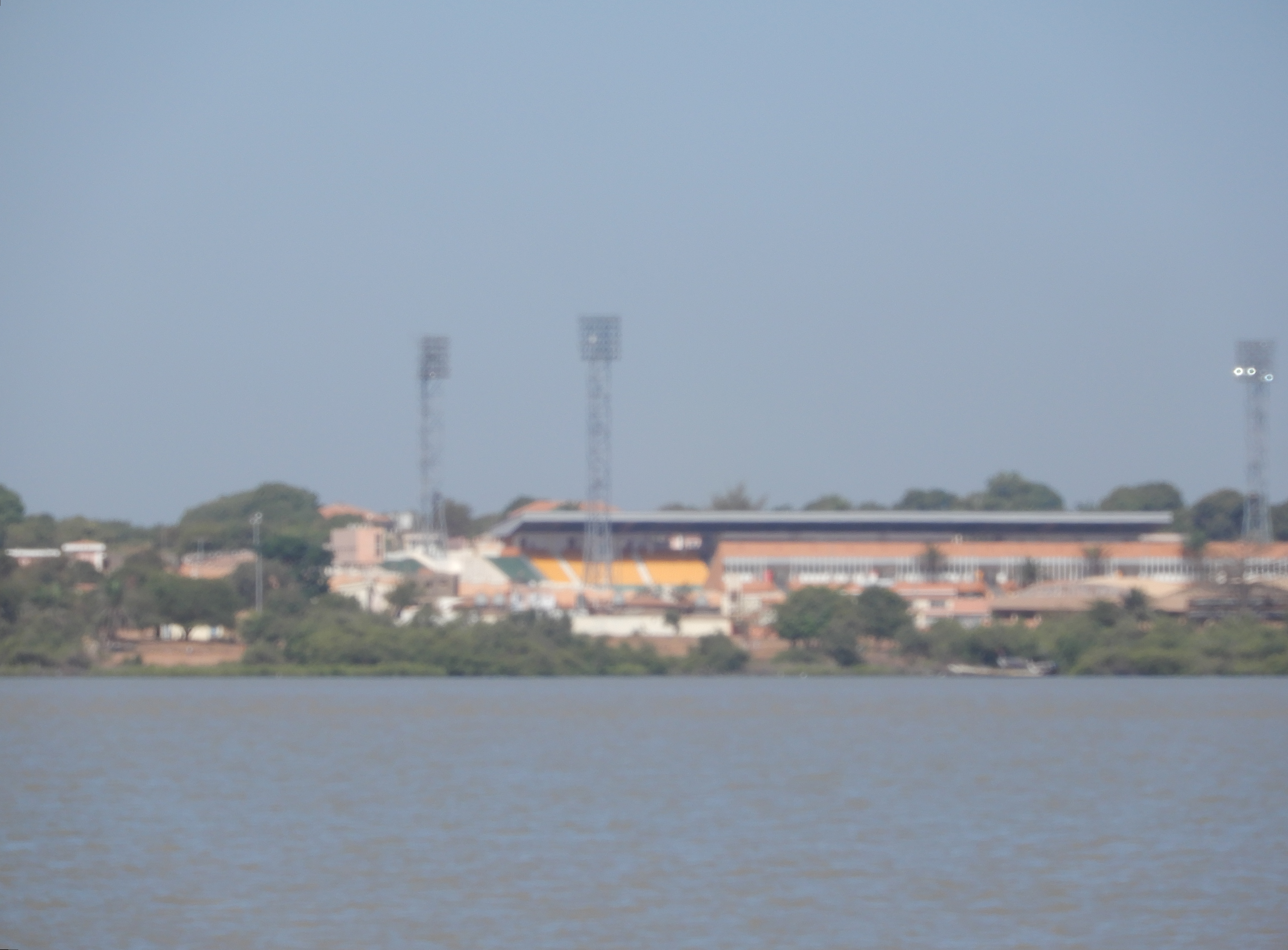

- Location within Guinea-Bissau
- Location: Av. 3 de Agosto; Bissau, Guinea Bissau
- Coordinates: 11°50′36.5″N 15°35′27″W
- Operator: Federação de Futebol da Guiné-Bissau, (FFGB)
- Capacity: 20,000
- Surface: Grass
- Record attendance: 22,000 (Guinea-Bissau vs Mali, 10 October 2003)
- Field size: 105 × 68 m

Construction
- Opened: 1989
- Renovated: 2011–2013, 2021–2023

Tenants
- Benfica Bissau; Inter Bissau; Portos de Bissau; Sporting Bissau; Guinea-Bissau national football team (1989–present)

24 September Stadium is a multi-purpose stadium in Bissau, Guinea Bissau. The stadium opened its doors in 1989. It is currently used primarily for football matches, and the stadium holds 20,000 people. It is currently the home ground of the Guinea-Bissau national football team.

== Usage ==
Football (soccer) clubs compete in the stadium including the city's chief teams of Benfica Bissau and Sporting Bissau which are also the country's popular teams. Other clubs playing at the stadium includes Inter Bissau and Portos de Bissau. Athletics is also used in the stadium.
