= 2018 Taça Nacional da Guiné Bissau =

Tournament details
- Country: Guinea-Bissau

Final positions
- Champions: Benfica de Bissau

The 2018 Taça Nacional da Guiné Bissau is the 34th edition of the Taça Nacional da Guiné Bissau since independence, the knockout football competition of Guinea-Bissau.

== First round ==
[Feb 27]

Portos de Bissau 0-1 Benfica de Bissau

Académica de Ingoré 0-1 Sporting de Bafatá

Djata FC (Fulacunda) awd Os Arados FC (Nhacra) [3-0 awarded; Os Arados FC (Nhacra) dns]

Massaf de Cacine awd Flamengo FC de Pefine [3-0 awarded; Flamengo FC de Pefine dns]

Lagartos de Bambadinca awd Atlético de Bissorã [3-0 awarded; Atlético de Bissorã dns]

Desportivo de Farim awd Quínara FC (Tite) [3-0 awarded; Quínara FC (Tite) dns]

CDR Gabú 3-1 ADR Mansabá

Sporting Guiné-Bissau drw Os Balantas de Mansôa [7-6 pen]

FC Cumura 0-1 UDIB

FC Canchungo 2-3 Nuno Tristão de Bula

Estrela Negra Bolama 1-4 Tigres de Fronteira

[Mar 13]

FC Cuntum 3-1 Vitória FC (Cacheu)

[Mar 14]

GDR Quelelé 3-4 FC Pelundo

== Second round ==
[Mar 28]

UDIB 4-1 Nuno Tristão de Bula

FC Cuntum drw Sporting Guiné-Bissau [4-3 pen]

FC Pelundo 2-1 Lagartos de Bambadinca

Djata FC (Fulacunda) 3-4 Massaf de Cacine

Desportivo de Farim 0-2 CDR Gabú

[Mar 29]

Benfica de Bissau 2-1 Sporting de Bafatá

Tigres de Fronteira bye

== Third round ==
[May 23]

Benfica de Bissau 2-1 Massaf de Cacine

FC Pelundo 3-0 CDR Gabú

[May 24]

UDIB 3-1 Tigres de Fronteira

FC Cuntum bye

== Semi-finals ==
[Jun 9]

Benfica de Bissau 2-2 FC Pelundo [4-2 pen]

[Jun 10]

FC Cuntum 2-0 UDIB

== Final ==
[Jun 23]

Benfica de Bissau 2-1 FC Cuntum [aet]

== See also ==
- 2017–18 Campeonato Nacional da Guiné-Bissau
