= ADR Desportivo de Mansabá =

- Short name: Mansabá
- Ground: Estádio Municipal
- Capacity: 500

ADR Desportivo de Mansabá is a football (soccer) club from Guinea-Bissau based in Mansabá.

Mansabá was promoted to the Campeonato Nacional da Guiné-Bissau after the 2004–05 season. The club finished third in the 2005–06 season.

== Achievements ==
- Campeonato Nacional da Guiné-Bissau: 1

1996

- Taça Nacional da Guiné Bissau: 2

2001, 2011

== Performance in CAF competitions ==
- CAF Confederation Cup: 1 appearance

2012 –
