= FC Bijagós =

FC Bijagós Tubarões Bijagós
- Full name: Tubarões Futebol Clube dos Bijagós
- Ground: Bubaque, Bolama Region, Guinea-Bissau
- League: Campeonato Nacional da Guiné-Bissau
- 2015: 12th, relegated

Tubarões Futebol Clube dos Bijagós (tubarões being Portuguese for "sharks", Bidyogo: Futebol Klube Bidyogo) is a Guinea-Bissauan football club based in Bubaque. They currently play in the top domestic Campeonato Nacional da Guiné-Bissau. It is one of two chief clubs of the Bijagos Archipelago, the other is EN Bolama.

The club entered the First Division in late 2002 and finished 10th with 18 points, Bijagós did not play in the following season as they withdrew and immediately relegated to the Second Division, not for a couple of years they return to the First Division Again for the 2015 season and was immediately relegated after being 12th inside the relegation zone.
