= FC Tigres de Fronteira =

Tigres de Fronteira
- Full name: Tigres de Fronteira
- League: Campeonato Nacional da Guiné-Bissau
- 2025–2026: 16th (reklegated)

Futebol Clube de Tigres de Fronteira is a Guinea-Bissauan football club based in São Domingos. They currently play in the top domestic Campeonato Nacional da Guiné-Bissau.
