= Benvindo António Moreira =

Bissau-Guinean footballer

Benvindo António Moreira (born 10 November 1989 in Bissau) is a footballer who plays for Tirsense.

Benvindo began his playing career with Boavista F.C. and moved to C.D. Aves when the club was relegated from the Liga de Honra following the 2008–09 season.
