= Bissau =

Capital and largest city of Guinea-Bissau

- Capital city
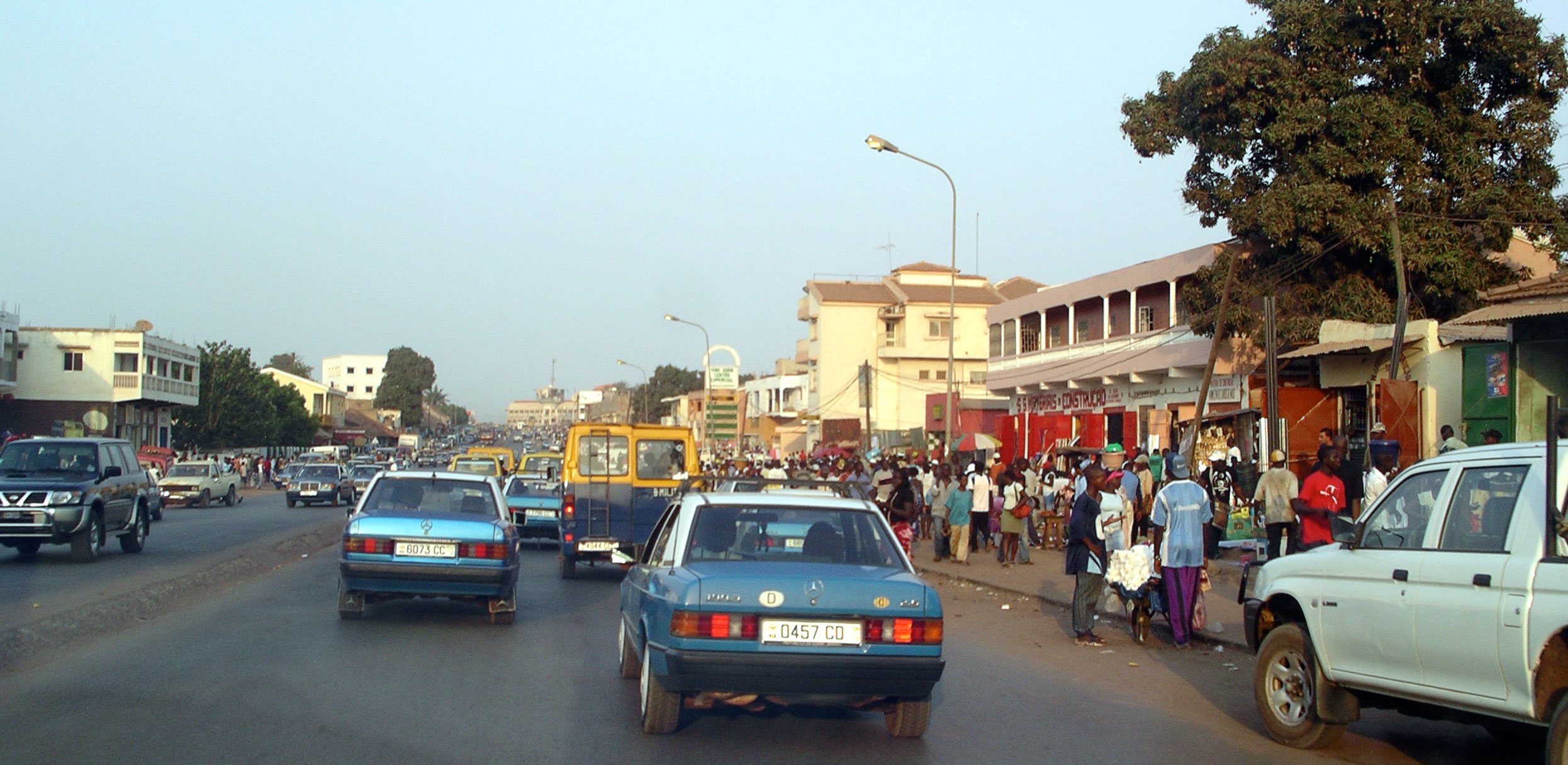
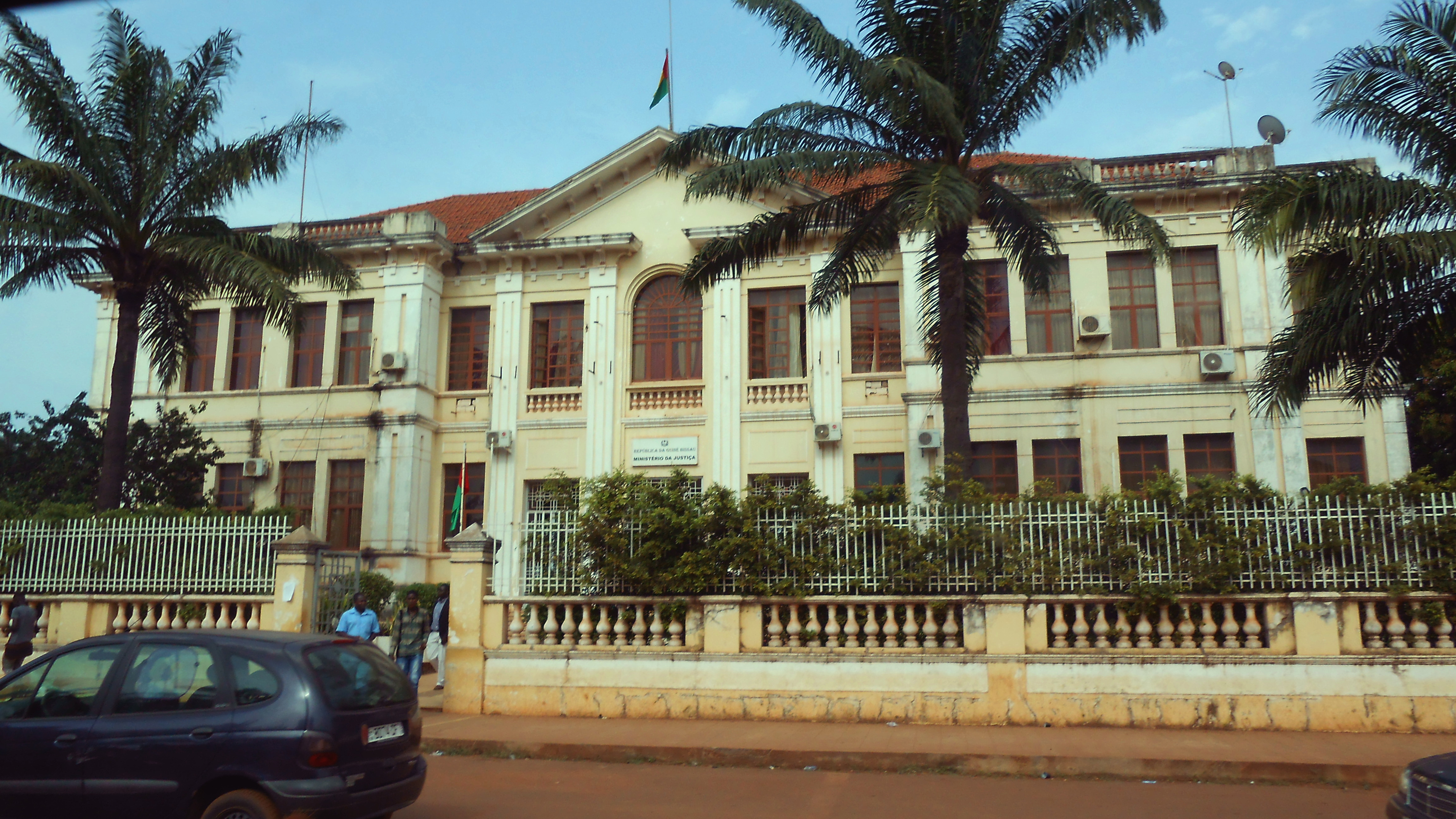
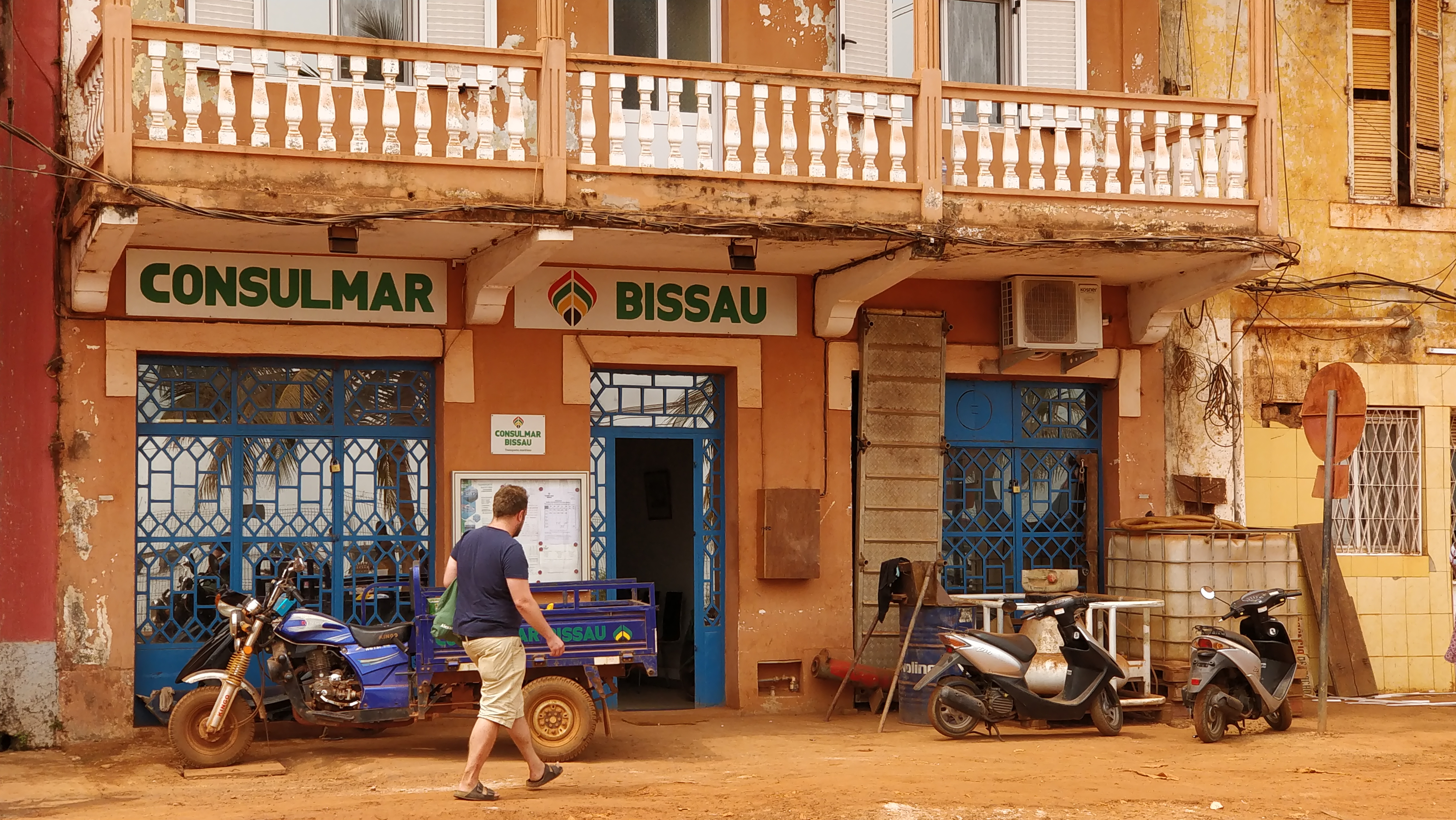
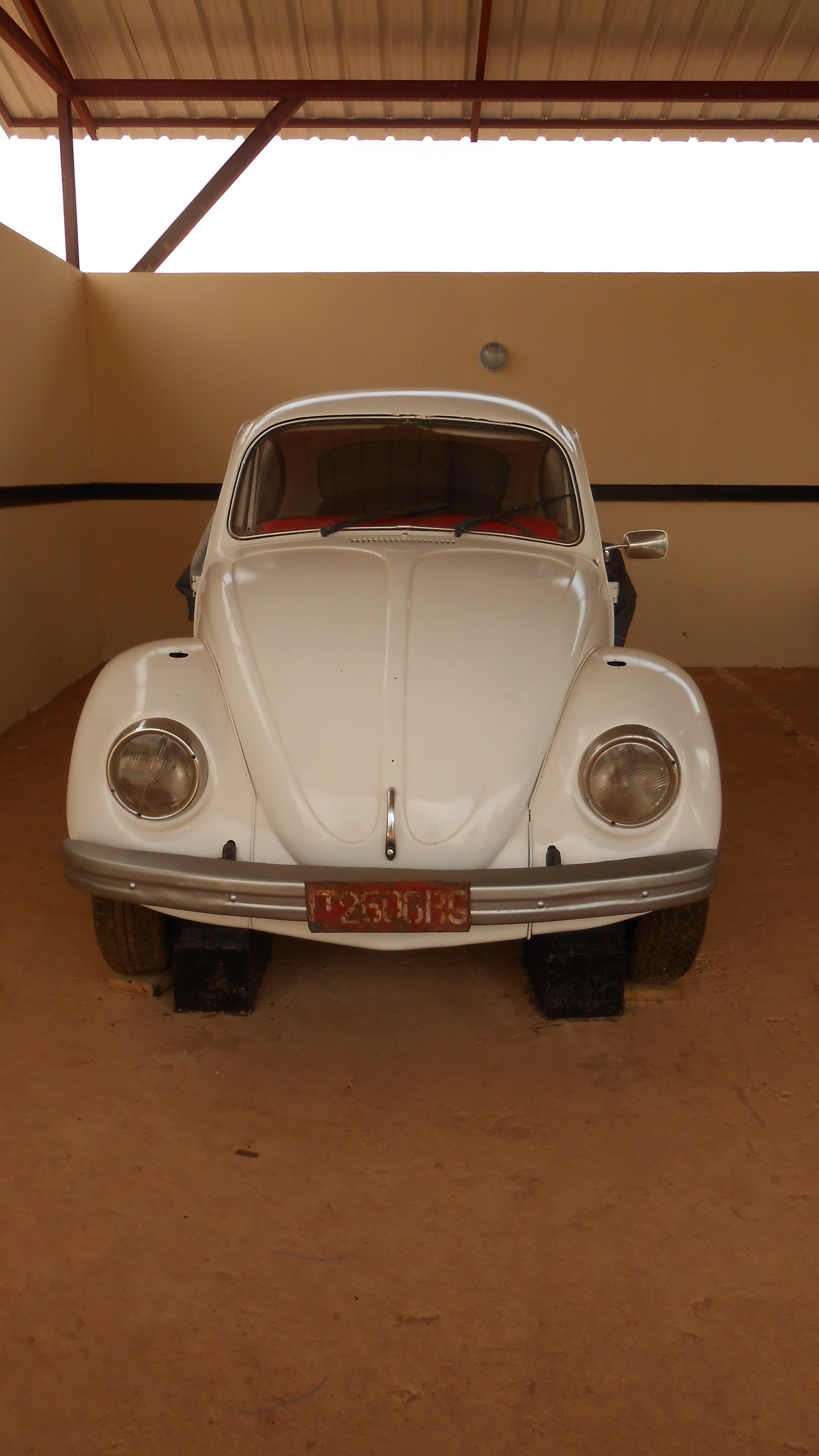
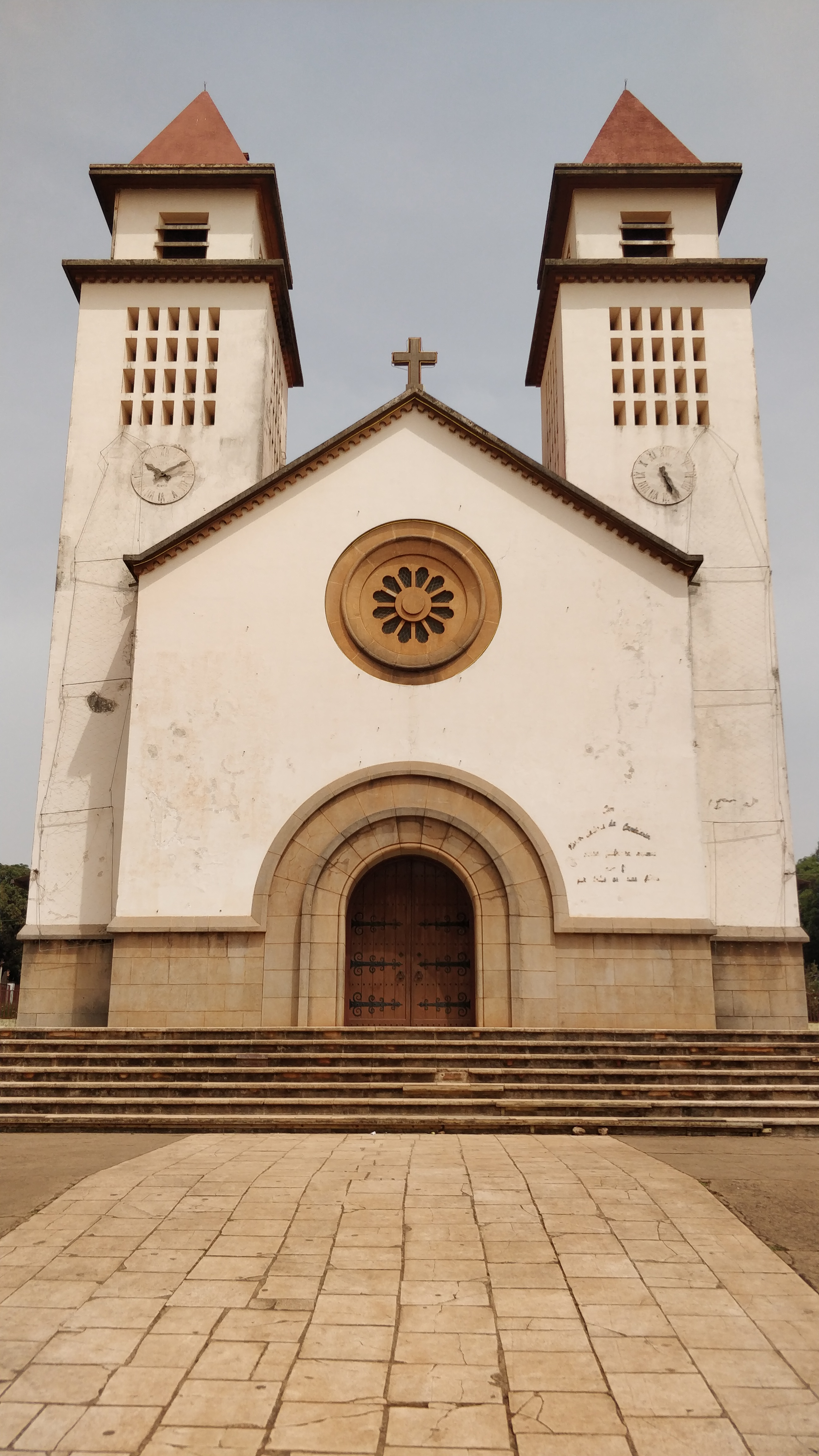
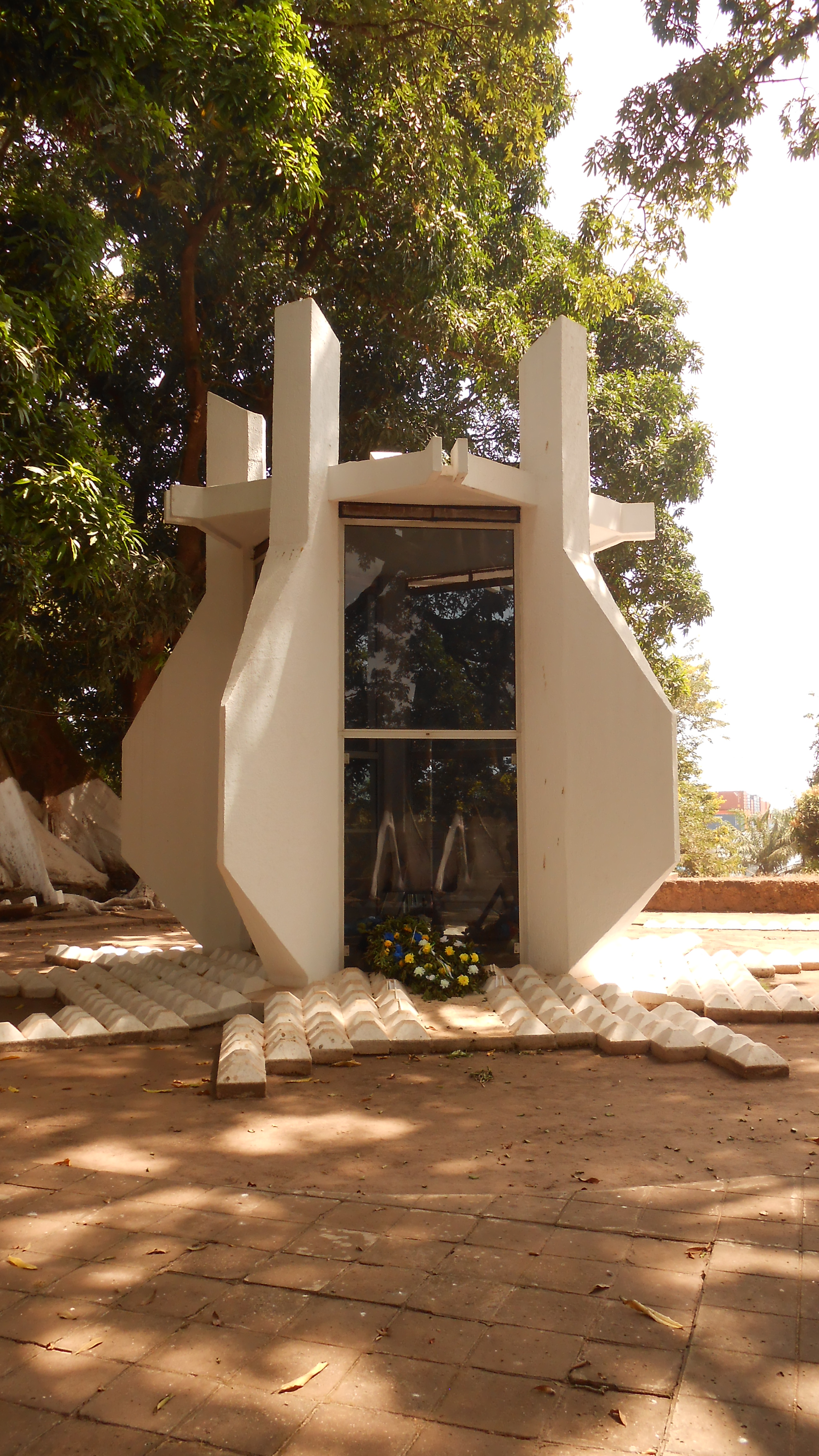
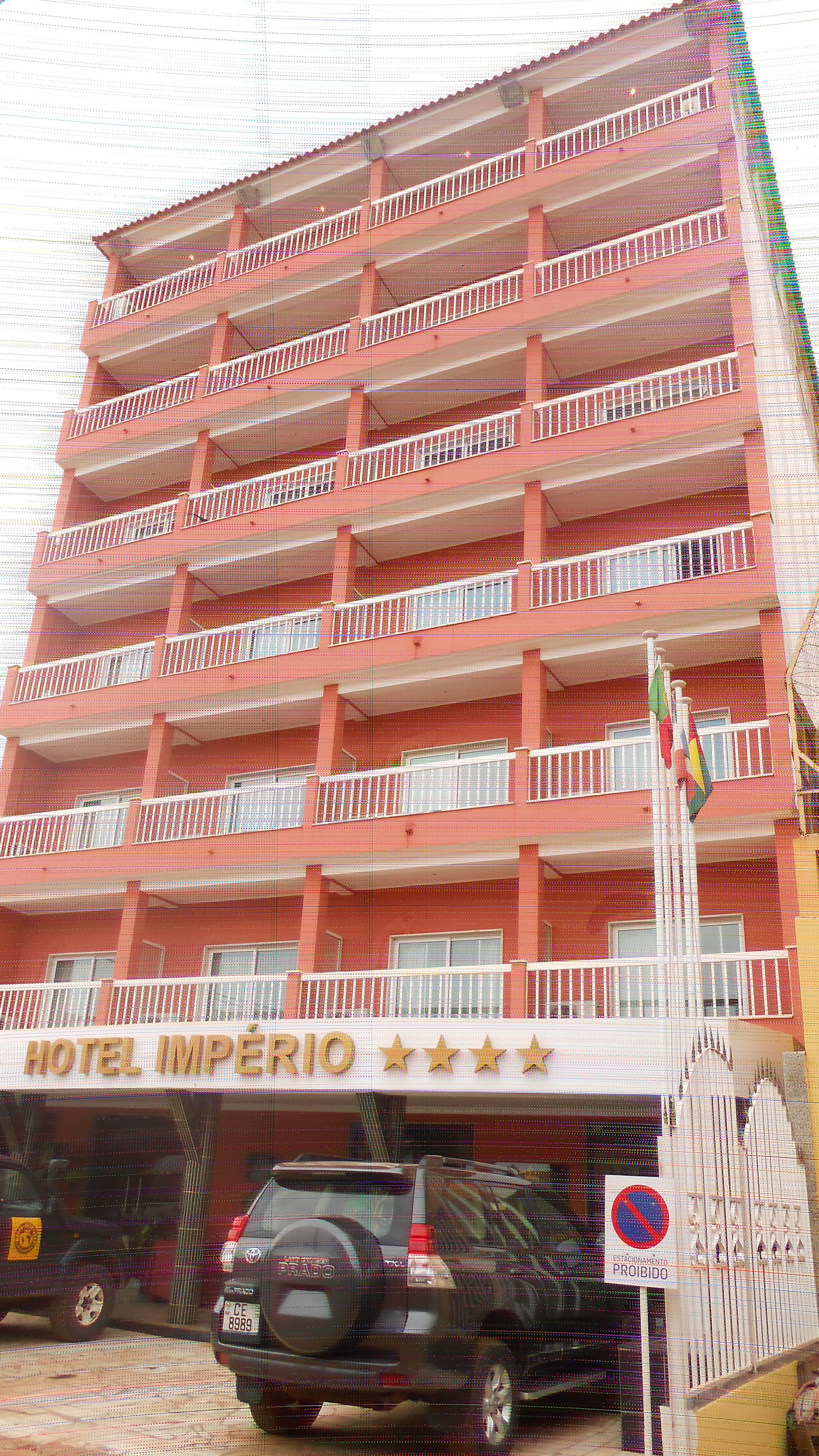
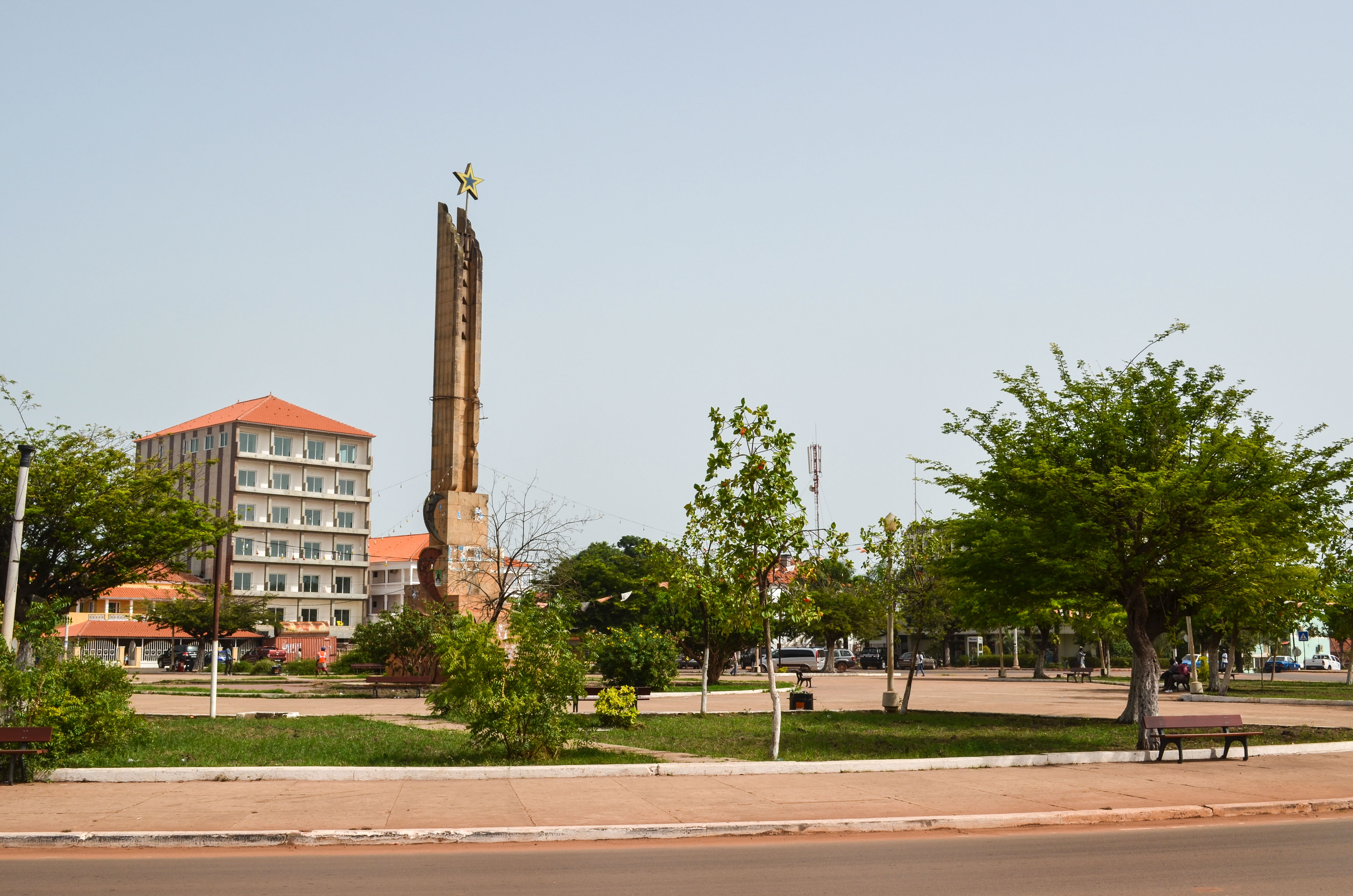
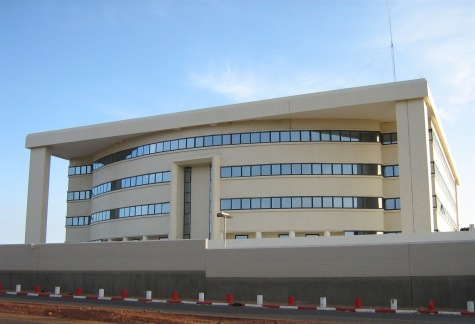
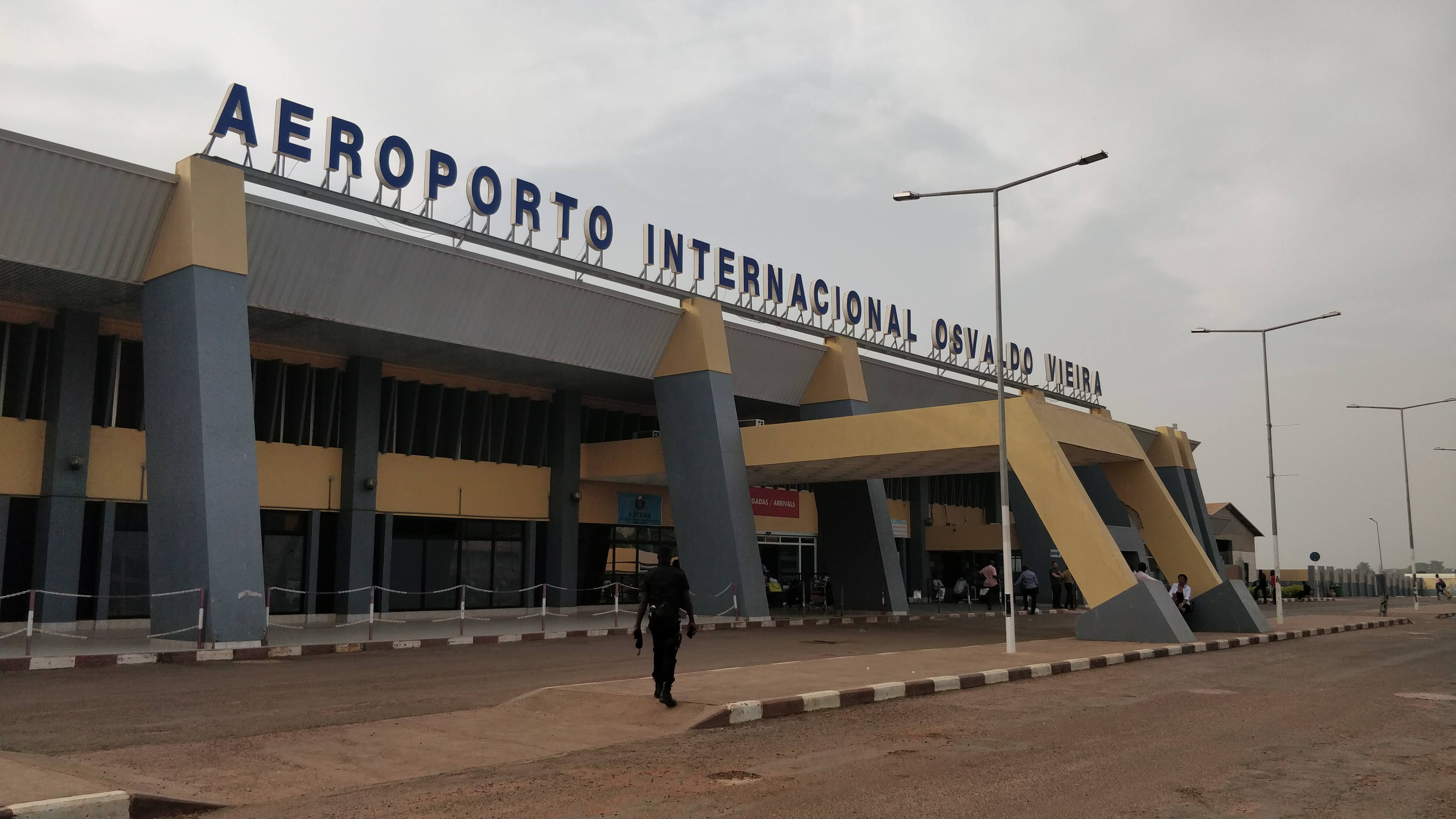
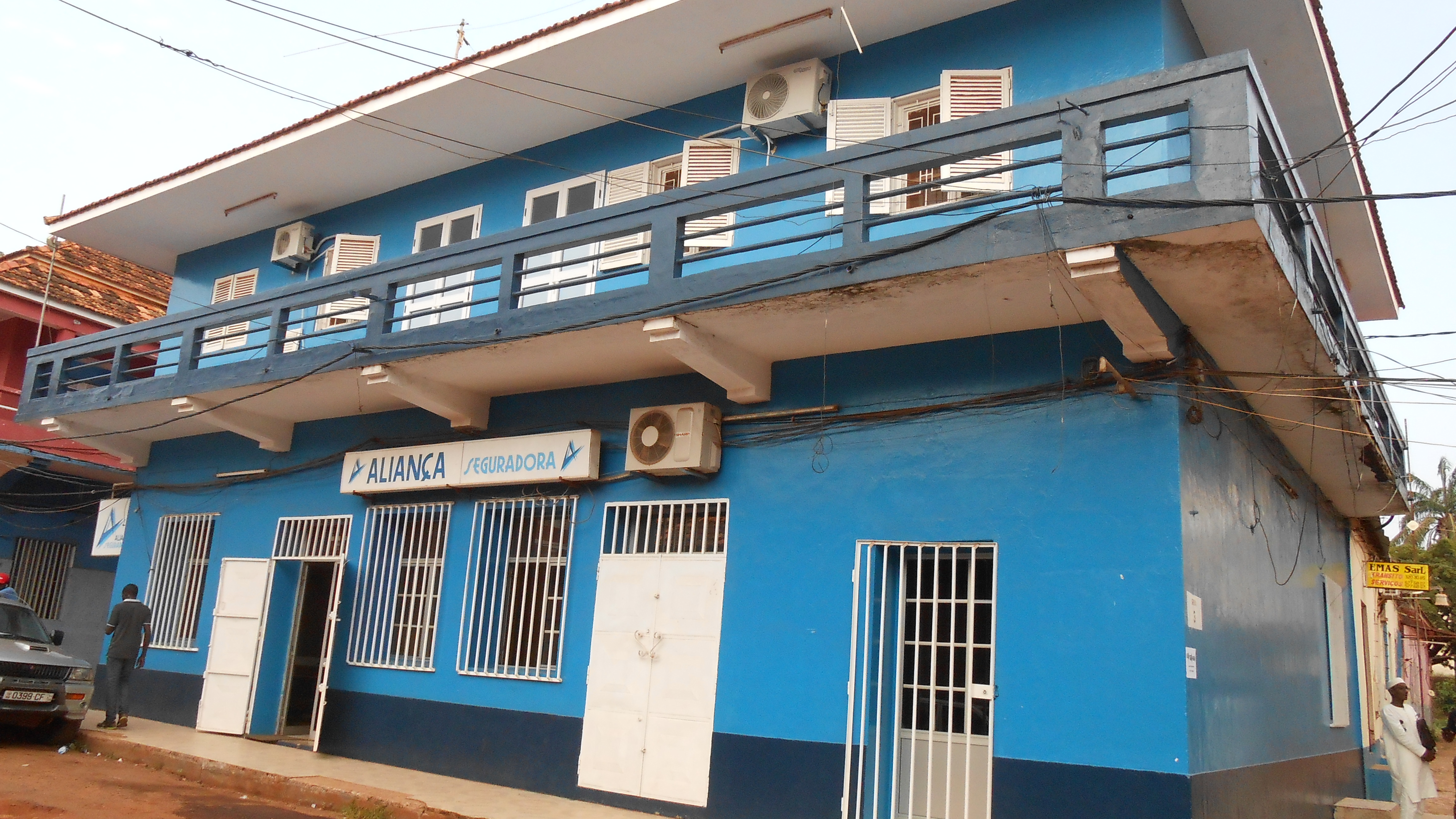
- Traffic in Bissau Ministério da Justiça Consulmar The car of Amílcar Cabral in the Museu Militar da Luta de Libertação Nacional Cathedral of Bissau Mausoleum of Amílcar Cabral Hotel Império Monumento aos Heróis da Independência BCEAO building Osvaldo Vieira International Airport Branch of the Aliança insurance company

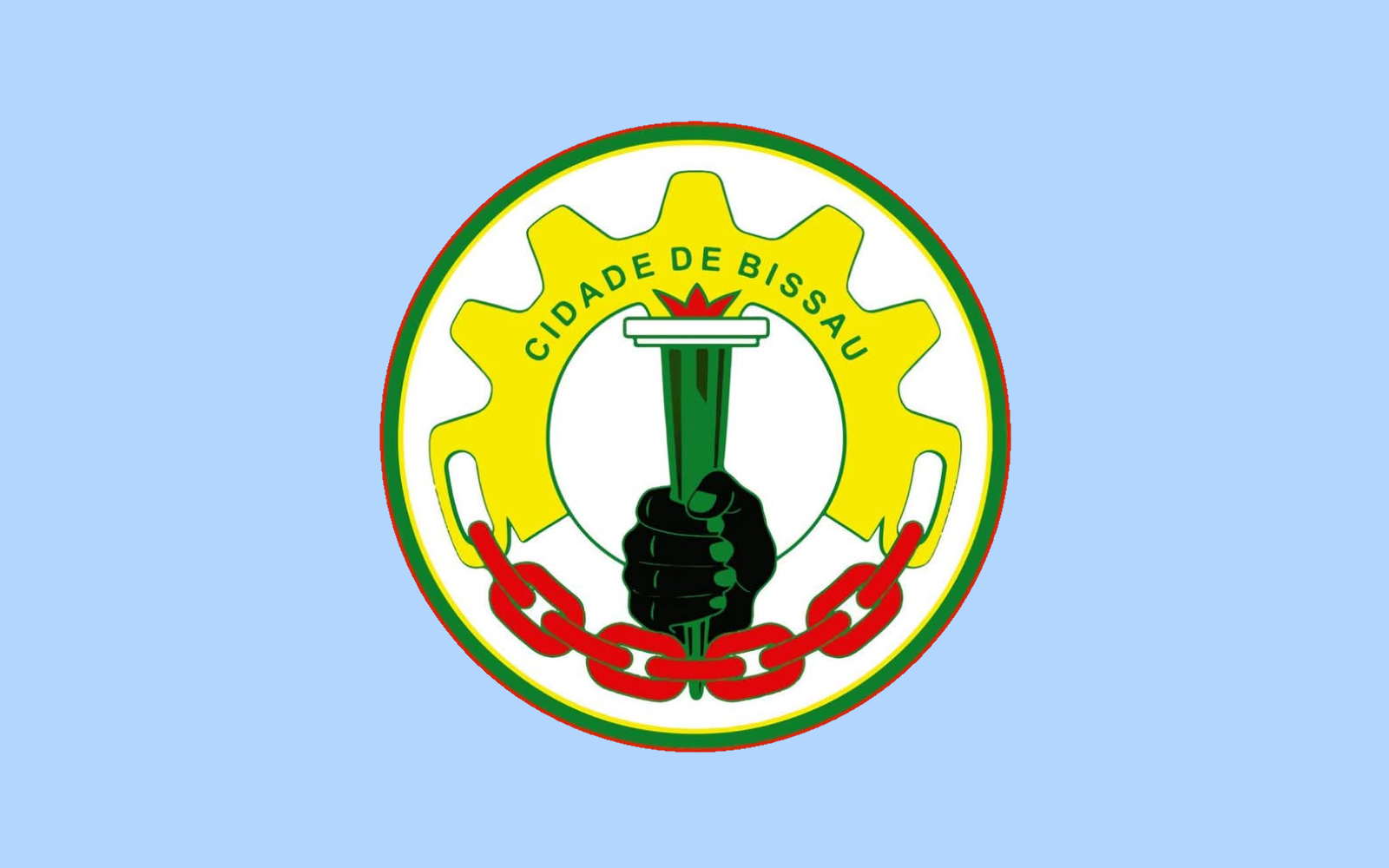
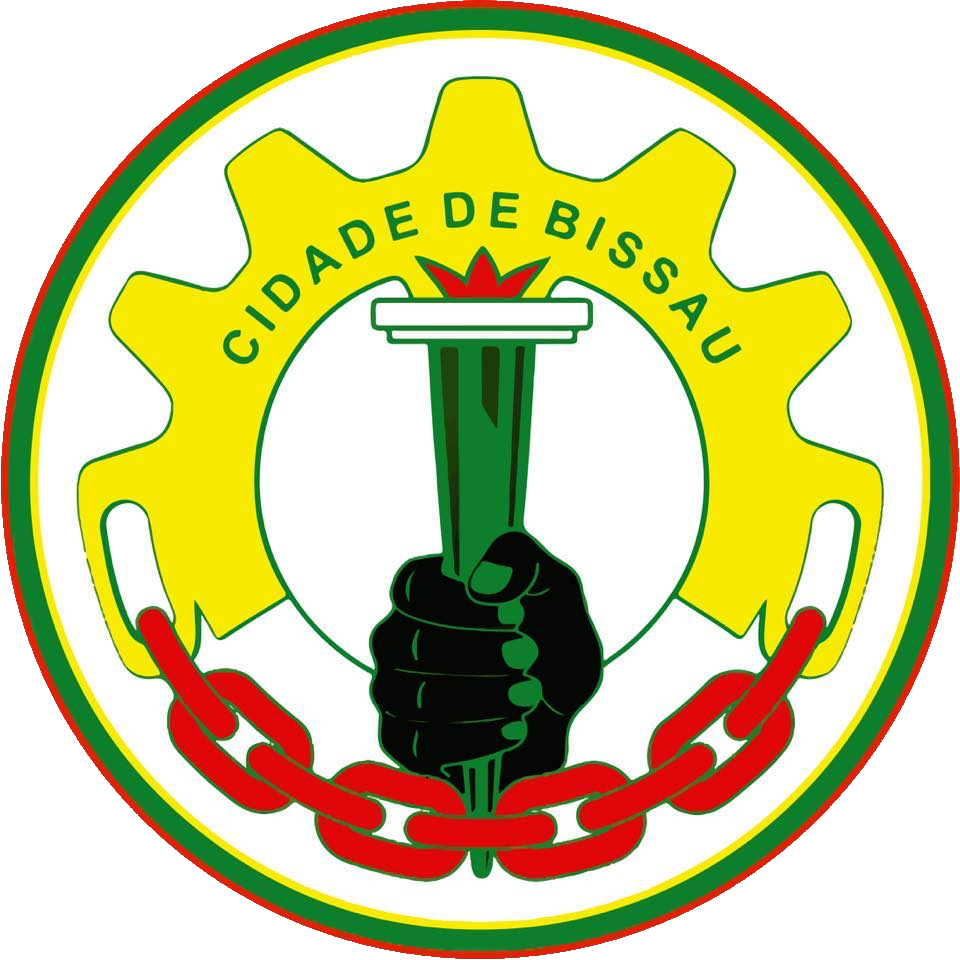
- Flag Seal

- Location within Guinea-Bissau Location within Africa
- Coordinates: 11°51′36″N 15°35′0″W
- Country: Guinea-Bissau
- Region: Bissau Autonomous Sector
- Founded: 1687

Government
  - Mayor: Salifú Djédju
  - Deputy Mayor: Umar Sonco
  - City Manager: Suleimane Candé
  - Deputy City Manager: Aliu Baldé
  - Chairman of Municipal Assembly: Bacar Seidi

Area
  - Total: 77.5 km^{2} (29.9 sq mi)
- Elevation: 0 m (0 ft)

Population (2015 census)
  - Total: 492,004
  - Rank: 1st
  - Density: 6,350/km^{2} (16,400/sq mi)
- Time zone: UTC+00:00 (GMT)
- ISO 3166 code: GW-BS
- Climate: Aw

Bissau (/bɪˈsaʊ/; Portuguese pronunciation: [biˈsaw]) is the capital and largest city of Guinea-Bissau. As of 2015, it had a population of 492,004. Bissau is located on the Geba River estuary, off the Atlantic Ocean, and is Guinea-Bissau's major port, as well as the country's administrative and military center.

== Etymology ==
The term "Bissau" may have come from the name of a clan, N'nssassun, in its plural form Bôssassun. Intchassu (Bôssassu) was the name given to the nephew of King Mecau—the first sovereign of the Bissau—son of his sister Pungenhum. Bôssassu formed a clan of the Papel peoples.

== History ==
From well before the arrival of Europeans to the early 20th century, the island of Bissau was governed as a kingdom inhabited by the Papel people. According to oral tradition, the kingdom was founded by Mecau, the son of the king of Quinara (Guinala), who moved to the area with his pregnant sister, six wives, and subjects of his father's kingdom. The kingdom was composed of seven clans, descended from the sister and six wives. The Bossassun clan, which descends from the sister, inherited the throne. The Kingdom of Bissau was highly stratified. The king's coronation involved the practice of binding and beating the king, as the king should know what punishment felt like before administering it, as well as the presentation of a spear, the royal badge of office. When the Portuguese began to trade there in the 16th century, the king of Bissau was among the most supportive monarchs of the region. In 1680 Bissau even helped the Portuguese in a conflict with the Papels of Cacheu.

The city was founded in 1687 as a Portuguese trading post. During this same period French activities in the area were increasing. Although the king of Bissau Bacompolco refused them permission to build a fort, he did grant them a trading factory, from which they shipped thousands of slaves, among other things. In response the Portuguese Conselho Ultramarino established the captaincy-general of Bissau, and by 1696 the town had a fort, a church, and a hospital. It was the main emporium for trade on and south of the Geba river, and was rivaling if not eclipsing Cacheu in importance.

Bacompulco died in 1696. King Incinhate emerged from the ensuing succession dispute despite tacit Portuguese opposition, and relations rapidly deteriorated. When Captain-General Pinheiro tried to enforce Portugal's monopoly in defiance of the Papel policy of free trade, Incinhate surrounded the incomplete fort and threatened to massacre the inhabitants. Pinheiro later died in Papel custody. Unable to enforce a trading monopoly or collect duties from foreign shipping, the Portuguese soon abandoned the fort. They returned in 1753 but, faced with determined Papel resistance, were unable to build a new fort and left two years later.

The fort was rebuilt by the Grão Pará and Maranhão Company in 1775 to better project Portuguese power and store more slaves for shipment to Brazil. Real control of the area, however, remained in the hands of the Papel kings. In 1869, as part of an effort to more efficiently govern the territory, Bissau was raised to the status of commune.

The decades on either side of the turn of the 20th century saw fierce resistance on the part of the Papels to colonial 'pacification campaigns.' In 1915, after 30 years of war, the Portuguese under the command of Officer Teixeira Pinto and warlord Abdul Injai defeated the Kingdom of Bissau and permanently incorporated it into Portuguese Guinea. In 1941 the capital was transferred from Bolama to Bissau. 1959 saw the bloody repression of a dockworkers' strike, a key event that pushed the nationalists towards armed resistance.

After the declaration of independence by the anti-colonial guerrillas of PAIGC in 1973, the capital of the rebel territories was declared to be Madina do Boe, while Bissau remained the colonial capital. The city was attacked in 1968 and 1971 by nationalist forces. When Portugal granted independence, following the military coup of 25 April in Lisbon, Bissau became the capital of the newly independent state.

Bissau was the scene of intense fighting during the beginning and end of the Guinea-Bissau Civil War in 1998 and 1999. Much of the infrastructure was destroyed and most of the population fled. The city rebounded after peace returned, holding more than 25% of the country's population during the 2009 census and witnessing the erection of many new and rehabilitated buildings.

In 2023, the Turkish electric company Karpowership cut power to the city, due to an unpaid bill exceeding $15 million. Power delivery stopped early on the morning of 17 October, and was resumed late the following day, after Guinea-Bissau had made a payment of $6 million.

== Geography and climate ==
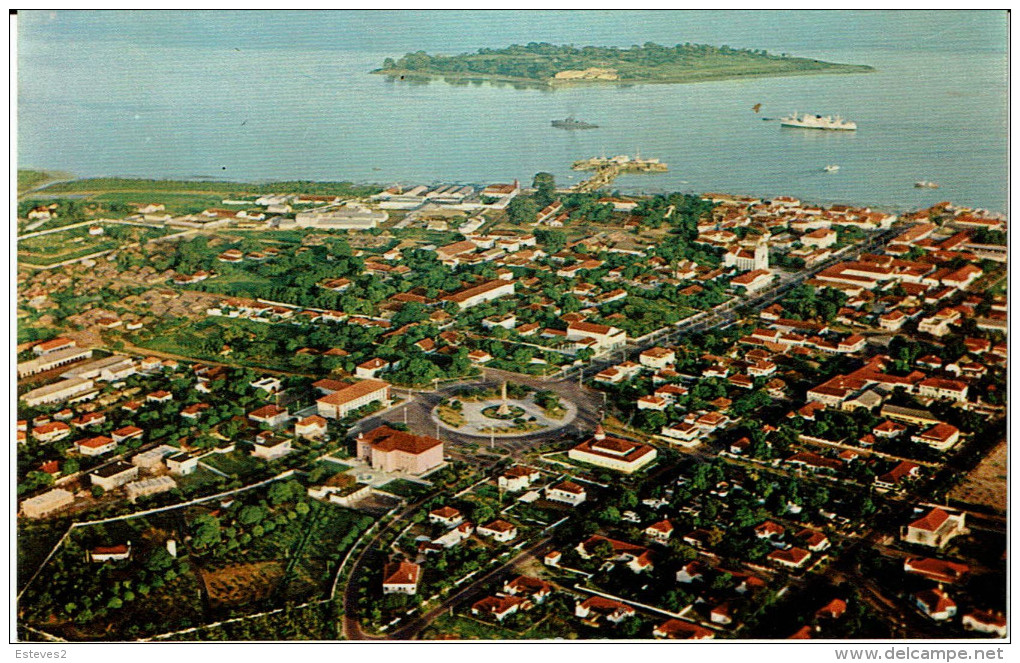
View of downtown Bissau in the 1960s as the capital of Portuguese Guinea

Bissau is located on the Geba River estuary, off the Atlantic Ocean. The land surrounding the city is extremely low-lying, and the river is accessible to ocean-going vessels despite its modest discharge for about 80 kilometres (50 mi) beyond the city.

Bissau has a tropical savanna climate (Köppen Aw), not quite wet enough to qualify as a tropical monsoon climate (Am) but much wetter than most climates of its type.

Almost no rain falls from November to May, but during the remaining five months of the year, the city receives around 2,000 millimetres (79 in) of rain.

Climate data for Bissau (Osvaldo Vieira International Airport) 1991–2020
| Month | Jan | Feb | Mar | Apr | May | Jun | Jul | Aug | Sep | Oct | Nov | Dec | Year |
|---|---|---|---|---|---|---|---|---|---|---|---|---|---|
| Mean daily maximum °C (°F) | 32.4 (90.3) | 35.2 (95.4) | 36.0 (96.8) | 35.3 (95.5) | 34.8 (94.6) | 33.0 (91.4) | 31.1 (88.0) | 30.4 (86.7) | 31.3 (88.3) | 32.3 (90.1) | 32.8 (91.0) | 32.6 (90.7) | 33.1 (91.6) |
| Daily mean °C (°F) | 25.3 (77.5) | 27.1 (80.8) | 28.2 (82.8) | 28.0 (82.4) | 28.5 (83.3) | 28.1 (82.6) | 27.2 (81.0) | 26.9 (80.4) | 27.3 (81.1) | 27.9 (82.2) | 27.7 (81.9) | 26.0 (78.8) | 27.4 (81.3) |
| Mean daily minimum °C (°F) | 18.3 (64.9) | 19.0 (66.2) | 20.4 (68.7) | 20.6 (69.1) | 22.2 (72.0) | 23.1 (73.6) | 23.2 (73.8) | 23.3 (73.9) | 23.2 (73.8) | 23.5 (74.3) | 22.5 (72.5) | 19.4 (66.9) | 21.1 (70.0) |
| Average precipitation mm (inches) | 0.1 (0.00) | 0.0 (0.0) | 0.0 (0.0) | 0.0 (0.0) | 10.6 (0.42) | 139.9 (5.51) | 371.0 (14.61) | 467.7 (18.41) | 364.4 (14.35) | 166.7 (6.56) | 10.9 (0.43) | 0.2 (0.01) | 1,531.5 (60.3) |
| Average precipitation days (≥ 1.0 mm) | 0 | 0 | 0 | 0 | 1.4 | 12.2 | 21.5 | 24.1 | 21.7 | 15.7 | 3.1 | 0 | 99.7 |
Source: NOAA

Climate data for Bissau, Guinea-Bissau (1974–1994)
| Month | Jan | Feb | Mar | Apr | May | Jun | Jul | Aug | Sep | Oct | Nov | Dec | Year |
|---|---|---|---|---|---|---|---|---|---|---|---|---|---|
| Record high °C (°F) | 36.7 (98.1) | 38.3 (100.9) | 38.9 (102.0) | 41.1 (106.0) | 39.4 (102.9) | 35.6 (96.1) | 33.3 (91.9) | 32.8 (91.0) | 33.9 (93.0) | 34.4 (93.9) | 35.0 (95.0) | 35.6 (96.1) | 41.1 (106.0) |
| Mean daily maximum °C (°F) | 31.1 (88.0) | 32.8 (91.0) | 33.9 (93.0) | 33.3 (91.9) | 32.8 (91.0) | 31.1 (88.0) | 29.4 (84.9) | 30.0 (86.0) | 30.0 (86.0) | 31.1 (88.0) | 31.7 (89.1) | 30.6 (87.1) | 31.5 (88.7) |
| Daily mean °C (°F) | 24.4 (75.9) | 25.6 (78.1) | 26.6 (79.9) | 27.0 (80.6) | 27.5 (81.5) | 26.9 (80.4) | 26.1 (79.0) | 26.4 (79.5) | 26.4 (79.5) | 27.0 (80.6) | 26.9 (80.4) | 24.8 (76.6) | 26.3 (79.3) |
| Mean daily minimum °C (°F) | 17.8 (64.0) | 18.3 (64.9) | 19.4 (66.9) | 20.6 (69.1) | 22.2 (72.0) | 22.8 (73.0) | 22.8 (73.0) | 22.8 (73.0) | 22.8 (73.0) | 22.8 (73.0) | 22.2 (72.0) | 18.9 (66.0) | 21.1 (70.0) |
| Record low °C (°F) | 12.2 (54.0) | 13.3 (55.9) | 15.6 (60.1) | 16.7 (62.1) | 17.2 (63.0) | 19.4 (66.9) | 19.4 (66.9) | 19.4 (66.9) | 19.4 (66.9) | 20.0 (68.0) | 15.0 (59.0) | 12.8 (55.0) | 12.2 (54.0) |
| Average rainfall mm (inches) | 0.5 (0.02) | 0.8 (0.03) | 0.5 (0.02) | 0.8 (0.03) | 17.3 (0.68) | 174.8 (6.88) | 472.5 (18.60) | 682.5 (26.87) | 434.9 (17.12) | 194.8 (7.67) | 41.4 (1.63) | 2.0 (0.08) | 2,022.8 (79.63) |
| Mean monthly sunshine hours | 248 | 226 | 279 | 270 | 248 | 210 | 186 | 155 | 180 | 217 | 240 | 248 | 2,707 |
Source 1: Sistema de Clasificación Bioclimática Mundial
Source 2: World Climate Guides (sunshine only)

== Demographics ==
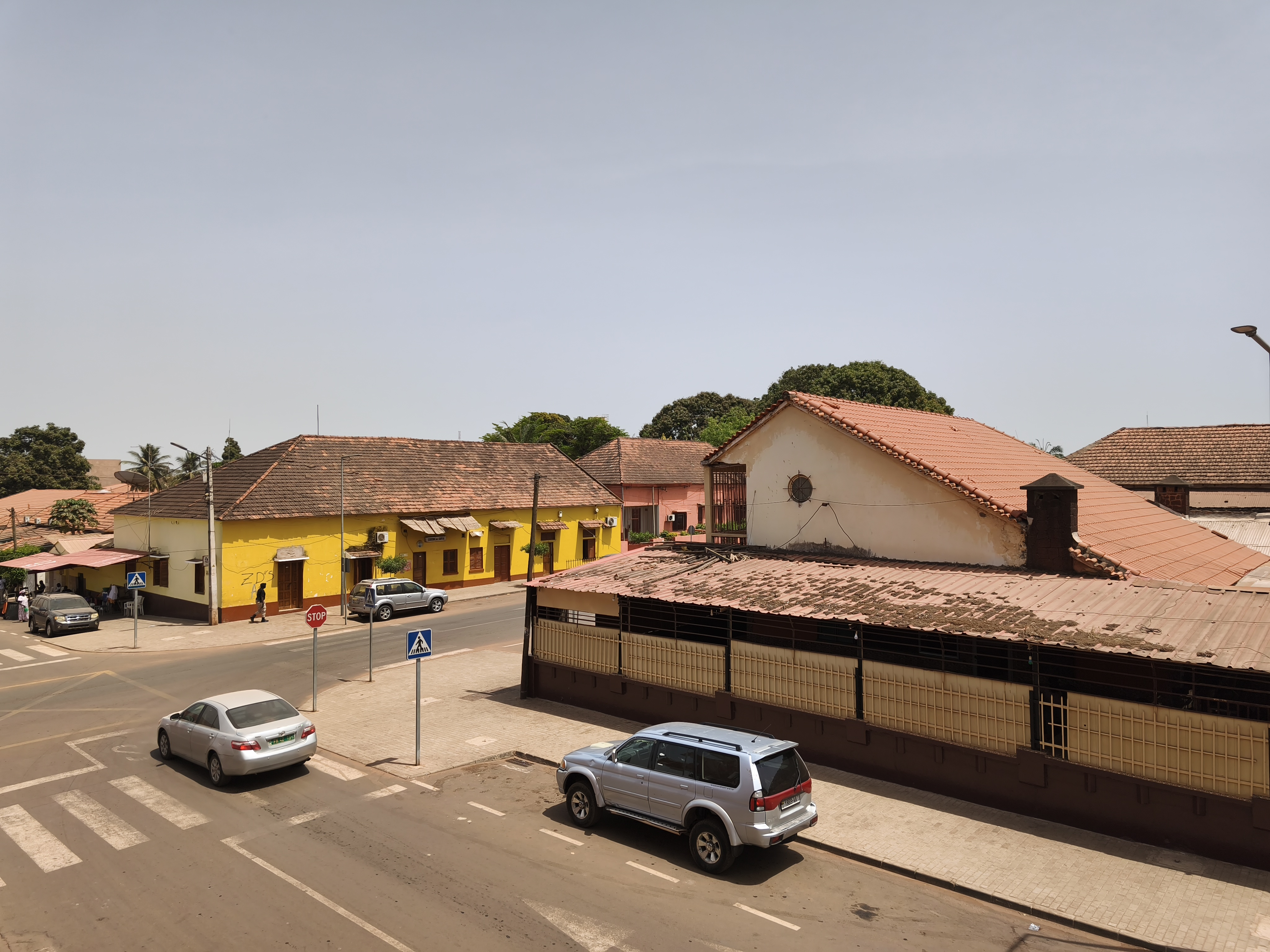
Centre of Bissau

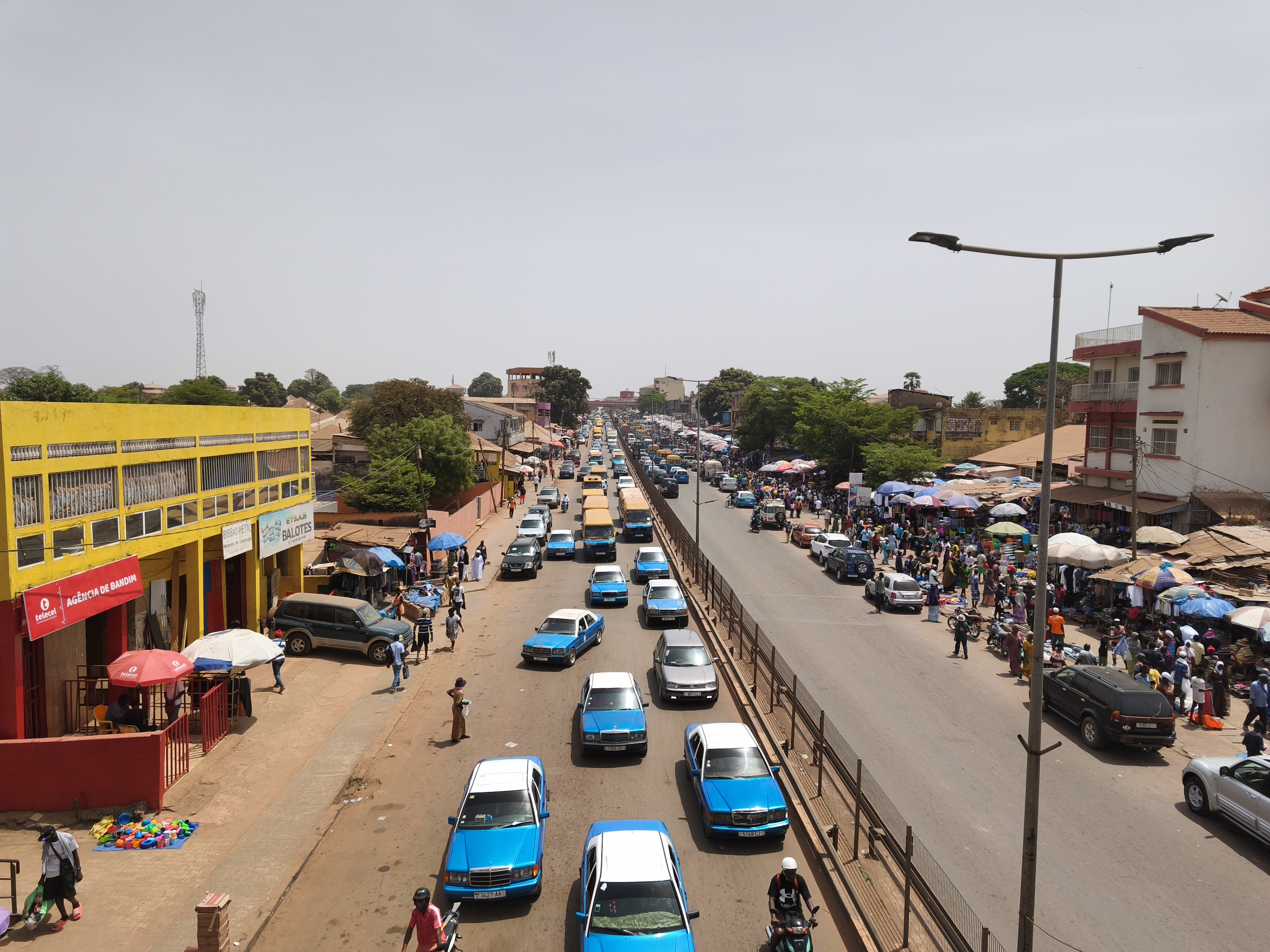
Streets of Bissau

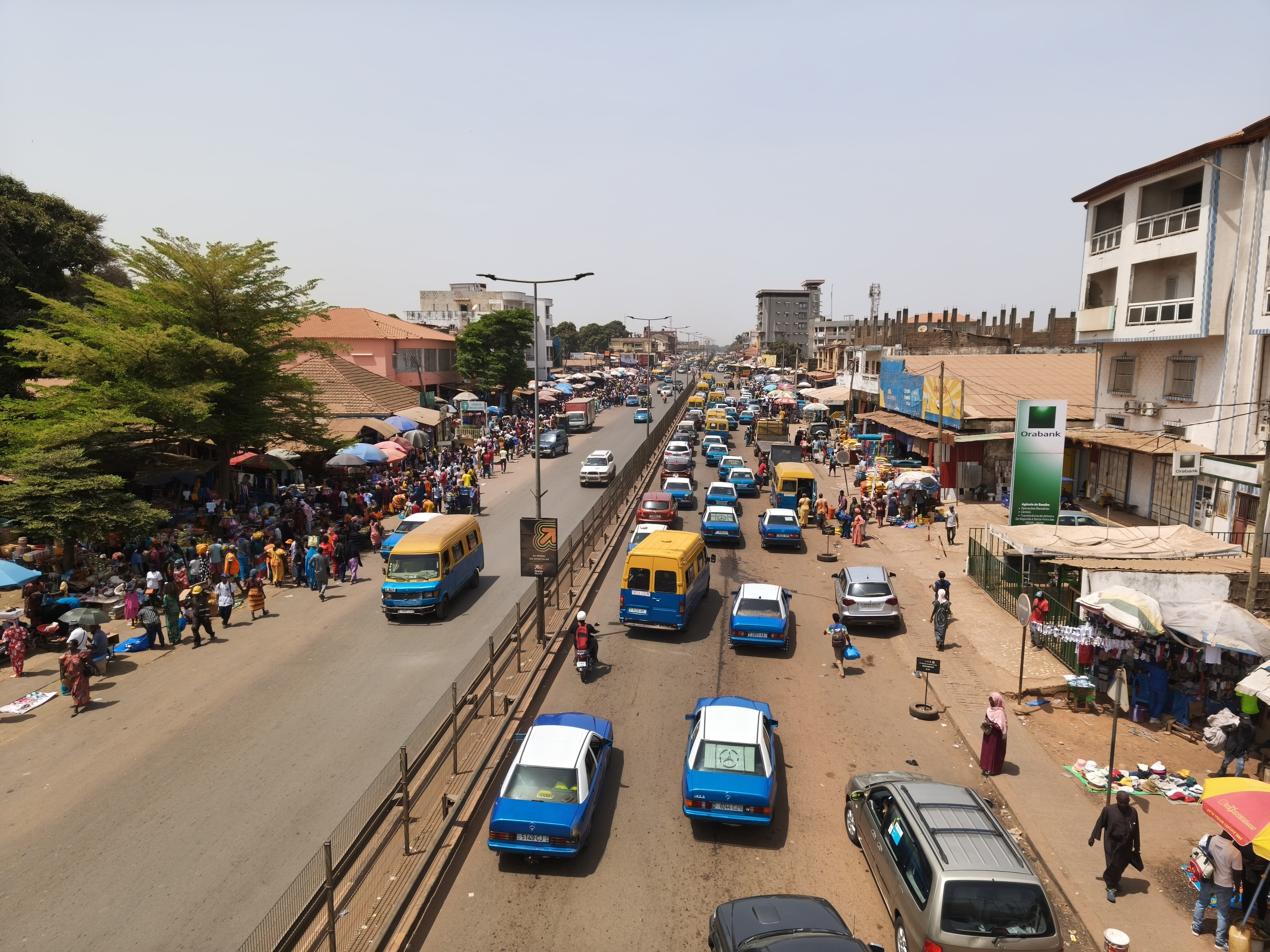
Life in Bissau

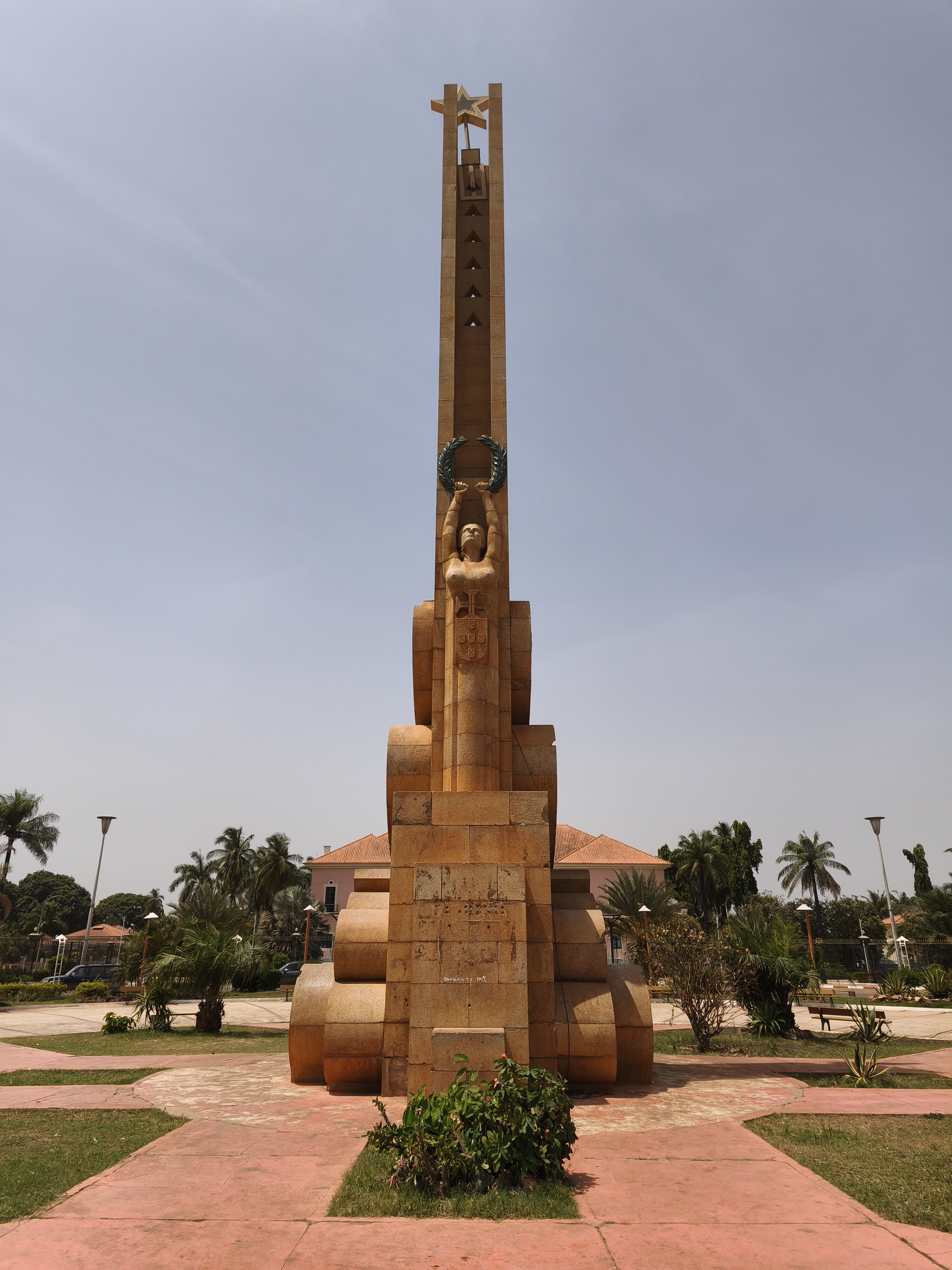
The Monument to the Heroes of Independence

At the 1979 census, Bissau had a population of 109,214. By the 2015 census, Bissau had a population of 492,004.

== Economy ==
Bissau is the country's largest city, major port, and educational, administrative, industrial and military center. Peanuts, hardwoods, copra, palm oil, milk products, and rubber are the chief products. Bissau is also the main city of the fishing and agricultural industry in the country.

== Transportation ==
=== Air ===
Bissau is served by Osvaldo Vieira International Airport, the country's sole international airport, which currently offers flights from six different airlines.

=== Highways ===
The main highway connecting Bissau to the rest of the nation and the continent is the Trans–West African Coastal Highway. There are also many smaller national highways that connect to other big cities such as Bafatá and Gabu.

== Education ==
The main secondary school institutions in Bissau are the National Lyceum Kwame N'Krumah and the Bethel-Bissau Adventist School. The main higher education institutions in the city are the Amílcar Cabral University, the Catholic University of Guinea Bissau, and the Jean Piaget University of Guinea-Bissau.

The city of Bissau still has two international schools:

- Escola Portuguesa da Guiné-Bissau
- Escola Portuguesa Passo a Passo

== Culture ==
Attractions include the Portuguese-built Fortaleza de São José da Amura barracks from the 18th century, containing Amílcar Cabral's mausoleum, the Pidjiguiti Memorial to the dockers killed in the Bissau dockers' strike on 3 August 1959, the Guinea-Bissau National Arts Institute, Bissau New Stadium and local beaches.

Many buildings in the city were ruined during the Guinea-Bissau Civil War (1998–1999), including the Guinea-Bissau Presidential Palace and the Bissau French Cultural Centre (now rebuilt), and the city center is still underdeveloped. Because of the large population of Muslims in Bissau, Ramadan is also an important celebration.

== Sports ==
Football is the most popular sport in the country, as well as in the city. Many teams are based in the city, such as: UD Internacional, SC de Bissau, SC Portos de Bissau, Sport Bissau e Benfica, and FC Cuntum. Stadiums that are located in the city are Estádio Lino Correia and Estádio 24 de Setembro.

== Religion ==
The main religions are Muslim (50%), then Christian (34%) and animist (7.9%).

=== Places of worship ===
Among the places of worship, Muslim mosques are predominant. There are also some Christian churches and temples such as the Roman Catholic Diocese of Bissau (Catholic Church), Evangelical Churches, and the Universal Church of the Kingdom of God.

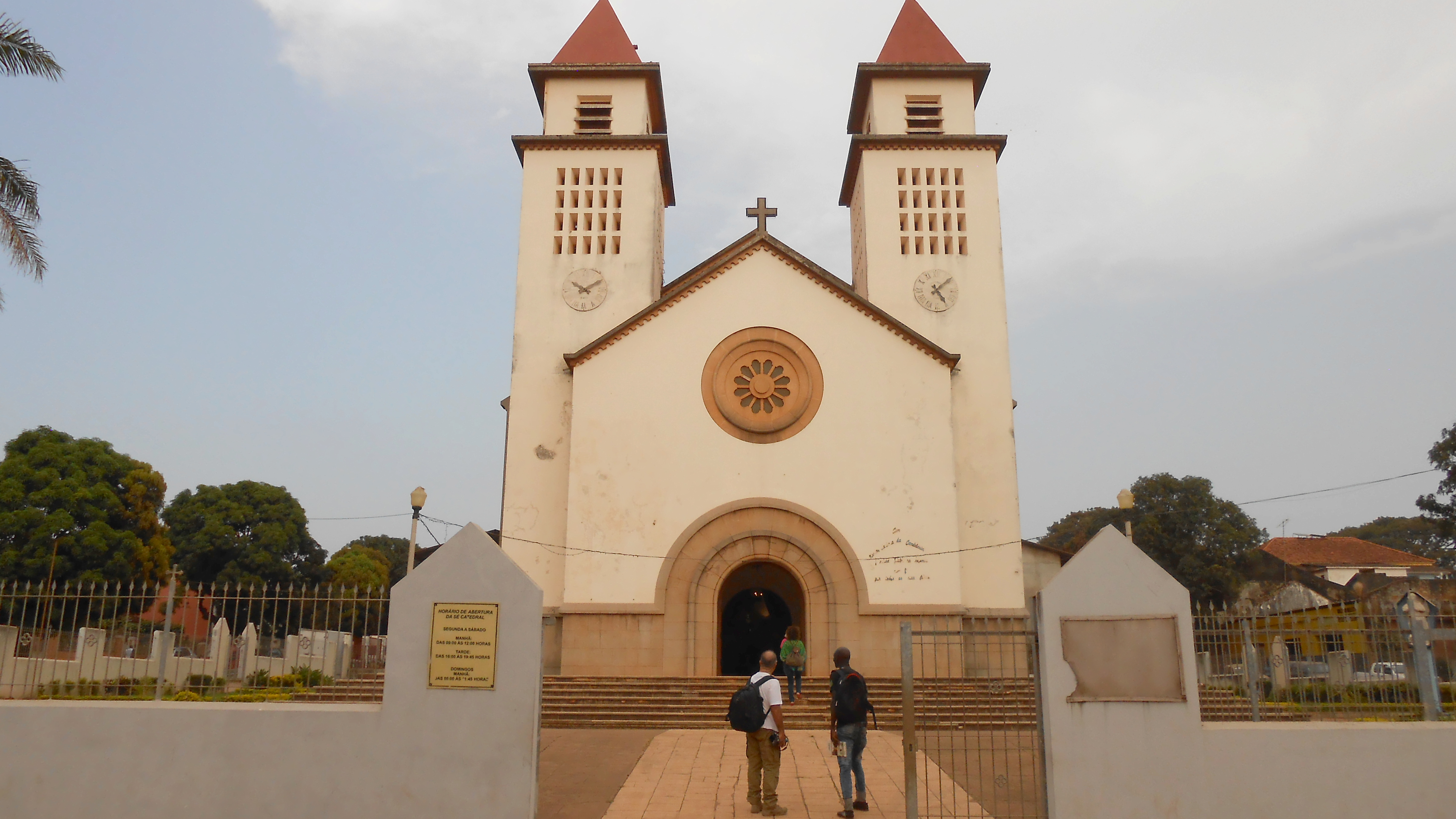
Bissau Cathedral

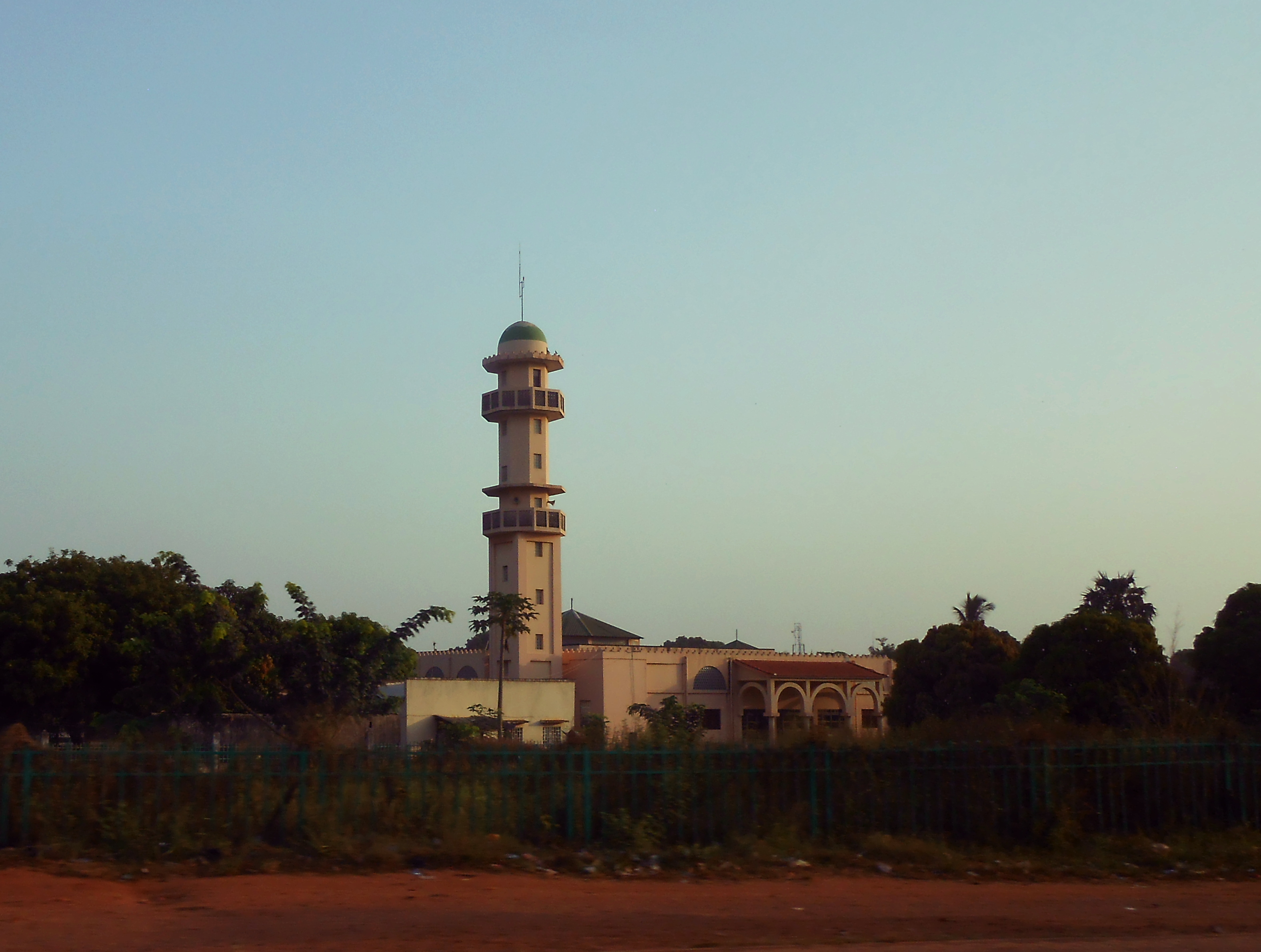
Mosque in Bissau

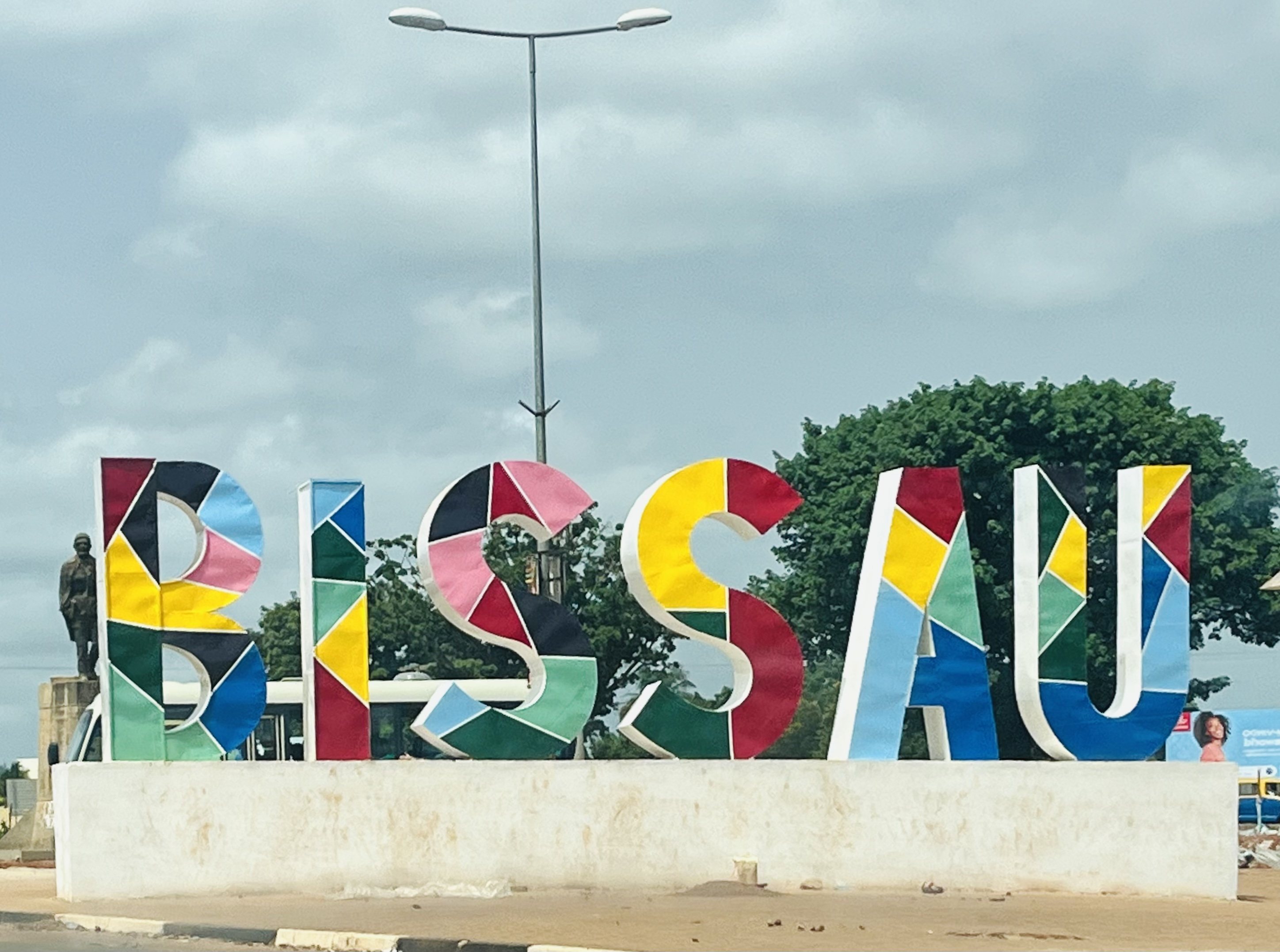

== Notable people ==
- Karyna Gomes (born 1976), activist, journalist, and musician
- Benvindo António Moreira (born 1989), footballer
- Eder (footballer)
- Bruma (footballer)
- Bocundji Cá, footballer
- Roger Fernandes
- Geovany Quenda

== International relations ==
=== Twin towns – Sister cities ===
Bissau is twinned with:

- Águeda Municipality, Portugal
- Dakar, Senegal
- Chongqing, People's Republic of China
- Agadir, Morocco
- Havana, Cuba
- Lisbon, Portugal
- Lagos, Nigeria
- Luanda, Angola
- Taipei, Taiwan
- Praia, Cape Verde
- Ankara, Turkey
- Sintra, Portugal
