= Desportivo de Farim =

Sporting Clube Farim
- Full name: Sporting Clube Farim
- Founded: 1934
- Ground: Farim Stadio; Farim, Guinea-Bissau
- Capacity: 5,000
- League: Campeonato Assotiation da Guine-Bissau

Sporting Clube Farim is a Guinea-Bissauan football club based in Farim. They play in the 2 division in Guinean football, the Campeonato Nacional da Guine-Bissau.

== Current squad ==
Note: Flags indicate national team as defined under FIFA eligibility rules; some limited exceptions apply. Players may hold more than one non-FIFA nationality.

No.	Pos.	Nation	Player
—	GK	(Guinea-Bissau) GNB	Luis Arnedao
—	GK	(Guinea-Bissau) GNB	Vanut Sario
—	DF	(Guinea-Bissau) GNB	Limrat Eutro
—	DF	(Guinea-Bissau) GNB	Loipi Dadau
—	DF	(Guinea-Bissau) GNB	Queranu
—	DF	(Guinea-Bissau) GNB	Hoilet Guvver
—	DF	(Guinea-Bissau) GNB	Maretr Fakito
—	DF	(Guinea-Bissau) GNB	Pirz Kurutu
—	MF	(Guinea-Bissau) GNB	Bebel Davilo
—	MF	(Guinea-Bissau) GNB	Satu Wepoit
—	MF	(Guinea-Bissau) GNB	Bupit Degitu

No.	Pos.	Nation	Player
—	MF	(Guinea-Bissau) GNB	Salir Terran
—	MF	(Guinea-Bissau) GNB	Purduse
—	MF	(Guinea-Bissau) GNB	Meliho Nuamga
—	MF	(Guinea-Bissau) GNB	Xebeto Via
—	MF	(Guinea-Bissau) GNB	Mudra Vigas
—	FW	(Guinea-Bissau) GNB	Perabo Ciru
—	FW	(Guinea-Bissau) GNB	Merces Gatru
—	FW	(Guinea-Bissau) GNB	Lunui Sampiti
—	FW	(Guinea-Bissau) GNB	Vugre Lunu
—	FW	(Guinea-Bissau) GNB	Pios Teraki
—	FW	(Guinea-Bissau) GNB	Xabio
