= CF Os Balantas =

Guinea-Bissauan football club

- Full name: Clube de Futebol Os Balantas
- Founded: 16 September 1946 (first club); 1974 (second)
- Ground: Estádio Corca Sow; Mansôa, Guinea-Bissau
- Capacity: 3,000
- Chairman: Geraldo Intchama
- Manager: Domingos Nancassa
- League: Campeonato Nacional da Guiné-Bissau
- 2025–2026: 13th
Home colours	Away colours

Clube de Futebol Os Balantas is a Guinea-Bissauan football club based in Mansôa. They play in the top division in Guinean football, the Campeonato Nacional da Guiné-Bissau. The club is named after the Balanta people (or Southern Balanta), the club location where the people inhabit. Mansoa is the main city of the Balantas in Guinea-Bissau. It is being the most popular club of the Oio Region.

== History ==
=== Earlier club ===
The earlier Os Balanta was created on 16 September 1946 and is an affiliate of the Portuguese club CF Os Belenenses and is its 13th affiliate.

They played their first match in the 1960 Portuguese Guinea Provincial Championships and played until 1974, the club won all championship titles (from 1973, also as the Guinea-Bissau Championships).

The club took part in the upper rounds of the Portuguese Cup before independence, they participated in five matches including Lusitano de Évora, SC Braga, Fabril, Académica de Coimbra and Beja. They had three colonial titles for what was Portuguese Guinea.

=== Modern club ===
The club was founded in 1974 in Mansôa, the year that the country became independent. It is the first club founded in Mansoa. The team was the first Guinean champion after the independence from Portugal and played in the preliminary round of the African Cup of Champions Clubs 1976, their first team they faced was Senegal's ASC Diaraf and lost all two matches. Their next appearances was 31 years later at the CAF Champions League 2007 and faced Algeria's JS Kabylie and again lost all two matches. Os Balantas nearly played in every continental competition after winning their championship title in 2010, next was Morocco's Difaa El Jadida. They missed the 2014 competition against Séwé Sports as Balantas withdrew. Balantas are one of several clubs that never made a win at the continental championships. They also won their only super cup title in 2006 after winning their second championship title.

In 2010, they headed to the Guinea-Bissauan Cup final, the club lost 2–1 to Sport Bissau e Benfica.

== Logo ==
Its logo is blue and features the acronym CFB.

== Achievements ==
- Campeonato Nacional da Guiné-Bissau: 4

1975, 2006, 2009, 2013

- SuperTaça Nacional da Guiné-Bissau: 1

2006

== League and cup history ==
=== Performance in CAF competitions ===
- CAF Champions League: 2 appearances

2007 – Preliminary Round

Os Balantas's results in CAF competition
Season	Competition	Qualification method	Round	Opposition	Home	Away	Aggregate
1976	African Cup of Champions Clubs	Bissau Guinean champions	Preliminary Round	(Senegal) ASC Diaraf	1–4	6–1	2–10
2007	CAF Champions League	Bissau Guinean champions	Preliminary Round	(Algeria) JS Kabylie	1–2	3–1	2–5
2010	CAF Champions League	Bissau Guinean champions	Preliminary Round	(Morocco) Difaa El Jadida	0–0	3–0	0–3
2014	CAF Champions League	Bissau Guinean champions	Preliminary Round	(Ivory Coast) Séwé Sports	canc.	canc.	^{1}

^{1}Balantas withdrew from the tournament

=== National level ===
Season	Div.	Pos.	Pl.	W	D	L	GS	GA	GD	P	Cup	Notes
2003–04	1	5	18	7	5	6	21	21	0	26		
2004–05	1	4	21	10	6	5	27	16	+11	36		
2006	1	1	22	14	8	0	31	11	20	50		
2009	1	1										
2013	1	1									3rd round	
2014	1	6										

== Statistics ==
- Best position: First Round (continental)
- Best position at cup competitions: Finalist (national)
- Total goals scored at the continental championship competitions: 4
- Total matches played at the CAF Champions League: 6
  - Total matches played at home: 3
  - Total matches played away: 3
- Total number of goals scored at the CAF Champions League: 4

== Managers ==
- (Guinea-Bissau) Bacri Sanha (until 2014)
- (Guinea-Bissau) Soo (in 2015)
- (Tanzania) Idrrissa Mwhinni (current)
