= FC Cuntum =

FC de Cuntum
- Full name: Futebol Clube de Cuntum
- Nicknames: Cavalos Brancos (English: White Horses)
- Founded: 27 December 1997
- Ground: Estádio Lino Correia; Bissau, Guinea-Bissau
- Capacity: 5,000
- Chairman: Pedro Bucar Sanhá
- Manager: Mustafá Baldé
- League: Campeonato Nacional da Guiné-Bissau
- 2025–26: 14th
Home colours	Away colours

Futebol Clube de Cuntum, also known as Cavalos Brancos ("white horses") is a Guinea-Bissauan football club based in the Cuntum district of the capital Bissau.

The club was established in 1997 and was promoted to the 1st division in Guinean football, the Campeonato Nacional da Guine-Bissau in 2010.

Cuntum were finalists in the 2018 Taça Nacional da Guiné Bissau, losing 2–1 to Sport Bissau e Benfica.
