= Taça Nacional da Guiné Bissau =

Guinea-Bissau National Cup Taça Nacional da Guiné Bissau
- Founded: 1976
- Region: Guinea-Bissau
- Current champions: Cantchungo (3rd title)
- Most championships: Sport Bissau e Benfica (10 titles)
- Broadcaster: National TV
- 2025 Taça Nacional da Guiné Bissau

The Taça Nacional da Guiné Bissau is the top knockout tournament of the Guinea-Bissauan football. It was created in 1976. Some of the competition, the semis and the finals are broadcast on radio (RGB) first aired after independence in 1974 and national television, TGB (Televisão da Guiné-Bissau), the television station was mostly been the only network of the nation up to around 2010.

== Winners ==
Year	Winners	Score	Runners-up
1974	Ajuda Bissau		
1975	No competition		
1976	SC de Bissau		
1977	União Desportiva Internacional	1–0	Ajuda Bissau
1978	União Desportiva Internacional	1–0	GDRC
1979	Bula		
1980	Estrela Negra de Bolama		
1981	Benfica Bissau		
1982	Ajuda Bissau		
1983	SC de Bissau		
1984	União Desportiva Internacional		
1985	União Desportiva Internacional		
1986	SC de Bissau		
1987	SC de Bissau		
1988	União Desportiva Internacional		
1989	Benfica Bissau		
1990	DRC Farim		
1991	SC de Bissau	1–0	Benfica Bissau
1992	Benfica Bissau	6–4 (aet)	Desportivo de Gabú
1993	Portos de Bissau		
1994	Ténis Clube de Bissau	2–1	Sporting Clube de Bissau
1995	Not played due to financial reasons^{1}		
1996	União Desportiva Internacional	4–1	SC de Bissau
1997	No competition		
1998	Portos de Bissau		
1999	No competition		
2000	Portos de Bissau	2–1	Mavegro Futebol Clube
2001	ADR Desportivo de Mansabá		
2002	Mavegro Futebol Clube (Bissau)	3–1	Sporting Clube de Bafatá
2003	Annulled^{2}		
2004	Mavegro Futebol Clube (Bissau)	1–0	Sporting Clube de Bissau
2005	SC de Bissau	4–2	Atlético Clube Bissorã
2006	Portos de Bissau	2–1 (aet)	Benfica Bissau
2007	Not known		
2008	Benfica Bissau	2–0 (aet)	Canchungo
2009	Benfica Bissau		
2010	Benfica Bissau	2–1	Clube de Futebol "Os Balantas"
2011	ADR Desportivo de Mansabá	3–1	Binar FC
2012	No competition		
2013	Estrela de Cantanhez	1–1 (3–1 pen)	Tigres de São Domingos
2014	Cantchungo	3–1	Estrela Negra de Bissau
2015	Benfica Bissau	5–1	Lagartos de Bambadinca
2016	No competition^{3}		
2017	FC Cantchungo	1–0 (aet)	União Desportiva Internacional
2018	Benfica Bissau	2–1 (aet)	FC de Cuntum
2019	SC de Bissau	5–4 (aet)	Sonaco
2020	Cancelled		
2021	Benfica Bissau	2–0	Canchungo
2022	Benfica Bissau	1–0	SC de Bissau
2023	Canchungo	1–1 (4–3 pen)	Cupelum
2024	União Desportiva Internacional	1–1 (3–1 pen)	Benfica Bissau

^{1}Also not held due to conflict between Benfica Bissau and the FFGB
^{2}The competition was stopped at the 3rd round, the 2nd round match between Tubarões de Bubaque and Cuntum Bissau was postponed to 28 June, the match was never held and the cup competition never progressed, on December 17, the federation annulled the competition
^{3}The cup competition of 2016 continued into the 2017 season and became the only biennial season of the cup competition. The first phase of the cup competition went on a halt due to financial and economic concerns. The cup competition was replayed for the 2017 season.

=== Performance By Club ===
Club	Winners	Last win
Benfica Bissau	10	2022
SC de Bissau	7	2019
UD Internacional	7	2024
Portos de Bissau	4	2006
Mavegro	3	2004
Cantchungo	3	2023
Ajuda Bissau	2	1982
Mansabá	2	2011
Bula	1	1978
Estrela Negra de Bolama	1	1980
Estrela de Cantanhez	1	2013
DRC Farim	1	1990
