= Campeonato Nacional da Guiné-Bissau =

Football league in Guinea-Bissau

- Founded: 1975
- Country: Guinea-Bissau
- Confederation: CAF
- Number of clubs: 16
- Level on pyramid: 1
- Domestic cup: Taça Nacional da Guiné Bissau
- International cup(s): Champions League; Confederation Cup
- Current champions: FC Canchungo (2025–26)
- Most championships: Sport Bissau e Benfica (15)

The Campeonato Nacional da Guiné-Bissau is the highest division in football in Guinea-Bissau. The league was formed in 1975.

== Campeonato Nacional da Guiné-Bissau – 2020 clubs ==
- AC de Bissorã (Bissorã)
- AFC Nhacra (Nhacra)
- Binar FC (Binar)
- CF Os Balantas (Mansôa)
- Cumpelum FC (Bissau)
- Cuntum FC (Cuntum)
- FC Canchungo (Canchungo)
- FC Sonaco (Sonaco)
- Flamengo FC (Pefine)
- Lagartos FC (Bambadinca)
- Massaf FC (Cacine)
- Pelundo FC (Pelundo)
- SC Portos de Bissau (Bissau)
- Sport Bissau e Benfica (Bissau)
- Sporting Clube de Bafatá (Bafatá)
- Sporting Clube de Bissau (Bissau)
- União Desportiva Internacional (Bissau)

== Previous champions ==
- 1975 : CF Os Balantas (Mansôa)
- 1976 : União Desportiva Internacional (Bissau)
- 1977 : Sport Bissau e Benfica (Bissau)
- 1978 : Sport Bissau e Benfica (Bissau)
- 1979 : title not given
- 1980 : Sport Bissau e Benfica (Bissau)
- 1981 : Sport Bissau e Benfica (Bissau)
- 1982 : Sport Bissau e Benfica (Bissau)
- 1983 : Sporting Clube de Bissau (Bissau)
- 1984 : Sporting Clube de Bissau (Bissau)
- 1985 : União Desportiva Internacional (Bissau)
- 1986 : Sporting Clube de Bissau (Bissau)
- 1986–87 : Sporting Clube de Bafatá (Bafatá)
- 1987–88 : Sport Bissau e Benfica (Bissau)
- 1988–89 : Sport Bissau e Benfica (Bissau)
- 1989–90 : Sport Bissau e Benfica (Bissau)
- 1990–91 : Sporting Clube de Bissau (Bissau)
- 1991–92 : Sporting Clube de Bissau (Bissau)
- 1993 : SC Portos de Bissau (Bissau)
- 1993–94 : Sporting Clube de Bissau (Bissau)
- 1995 : title not given
- 1996 : ADR Desportivo de Mansabá (Mansabá)
- 1997 : Sporting Clube de Bissau (Bissau)
- 1998 : Sporting Clube de Bissau (Bissau)
- 1999 : no championship
- 2000 : Sporting Clube de Bissau (Bissau)
- 2001 : no championship
- 2002 : Sporting Clube de Bissau (Bissau)
- 2002–03 : União Desportiva Internacional (Bissau)
- 2003–04 : Sporting Clube de Bissau (Bissau)
- 2004–05 : Sporting Clube de Bissau (Bissau)
- 2005–06 : CF Os Balantas (Mansôa)
- 2006–07 : Sporting Clube de Bissau (Bissau)
- 2007–08 : Sporting Clube de Bafatá (Bissau)
- 2008–09 : CF Os Balantas (Mansôa)
- 2009–10 : Sport Bissau e Benfica (Bissau)
- 2010–11 : Atlético Clube de Bissorã (Bissorã)
- 2011–12 : no competition due to financial problems
- 2013 : CF Os Balantas (Mansôa)
- 2014 : Nuno Tristão FC (Bula)
- 2015 : Sport Bissau e Benfica (Bissau)
- 2016 : no competition after the 7th round, it was abandoned in May due to financial problems
- 2016–17 : Sport Bissau e Benfica (Bissau)
- 2017–18 : Sport Bissau e Benfica (Bissau)
- 2018–19 : União Desportiva Internacional (Bissau)
- 2019–20 : abandoned
- 2020–21 : Sporting Clube de Bissau (Bissau)
- 2021–22 : Sport Bissau e Benfica (Bissau)
- 2022–23 : FC Canchungo
- 2023–24 : Sport Bissau e Benfica (Bissau)
- 2024–25 : Sport Bissau e Benfica (Bissau)
- 2025–26 : FC Canchungo

== Performance By Club ==
| Club | City | Titles | Last title |
|---|---|---|---|
| Sport Bissau e Benfica | Bissau | 15 | 2024–25 |
| Sporting Clube de Bissau | Bissau | 14 | 2020–21 |
| CF Os Balantas | Mansôa | 4 | 2013 |
| União Desportiva Internacional | Bissau | 4 | 2018–19 |
| Canchungo | Canchungo | 2 | 2025–26 |
| Sporting Clube de Bafatá | Bafatá | 2 | 2007–08 |
| SC Portos de Bissau | Bissau | 1 | 1993 |
| ADR Desportivo de Mansabá | Mansabá | 1 | 1996 |
| Atlético Clube de Bissorã | Bissorã | 1 | 2010–11 |
| Nuno Tristão FC | Bula | 1 | 2014 |

== Top goalscorers ==
| Year | | Best scorers | Team | Goals |
|---|---|---|---|---|
| 2002 | | Amadú | UDIB | 9 |
| 2002 | | Apatchi | Sport Bissau e Benfica | 9 |
| 2002–03 | (Guinea-Bissau) | Amadú Baldé | Sporting Clube de Bissau | 25 |
| 2004–05 | (Guinea-Bissau) | Braima Ducure | Sport Bissau e Benfica | 28 |
| 2018–19 | (Guinea-Bissau) | João Carlos "Madjer" | Sporting Clube de Bissau | 14 |
| 2006–07 | (Guinea-Bissau) | Mamadi Danfa Baba | ADRD Mansabá | 9 |
| 2007–08 | (Guinea-Bissau) | Alberto Có "Stromberg" | Sport Bissau e Benfica | 22 |
| 2009–10 | (Guinea-Bissau) | Dauda Bá | Sporting Clube de Bafatá | |
| 2015 | (Guinea-Bissau) | Sumaila Djassi | Sport Bissau e Benfica | 27 |
| 2018–19 | (Guinea-Bissau) | Toni da Silva | UDIB | 11 |
| 2018–19 | | Ibraima Conte | Portos de Bissau | 11 |
| 2020–21 | (Guinea-Bissau) | Dinis Djadjo | Sport Bissau e Benfica | 15 |
| 2021–22 | (Senegal) | John Charles Mendy | Sporting Bissau | 18 |
| 2022–23 | (Guinea-Bissau) | Albino | Cuntum | 20 |

== See also ==
- Acaja Club
- Ajuda United
