= FC Canchungo =

- Full name: Futebol Clube de Canchungo
- Ground: Estádio Francinaldo Embaló
- Capacity: 2,000
- Chairman: Edmilson Djabaté
- Manager: Guizé Camará
- League: Campeonato Nacional da Guiné-Bissau
- 2024–2025: 6th

Futebol Clube de Canchungo is a Guinea-Bissauan football club based in Canchungo. They currently play in the top domestic Campeonato Nacional da Guiné-Bissau. They are also well known for the excellence of their Academy and the number of players that they form that go to Europe.

The club won the Taça Nacional da Guiné Bissau in 2014, 2017 and 2023.
