= Bula (Guinea-Bissau) =

Sector of Cacheu Region, Guinea-Bissau

- Sector
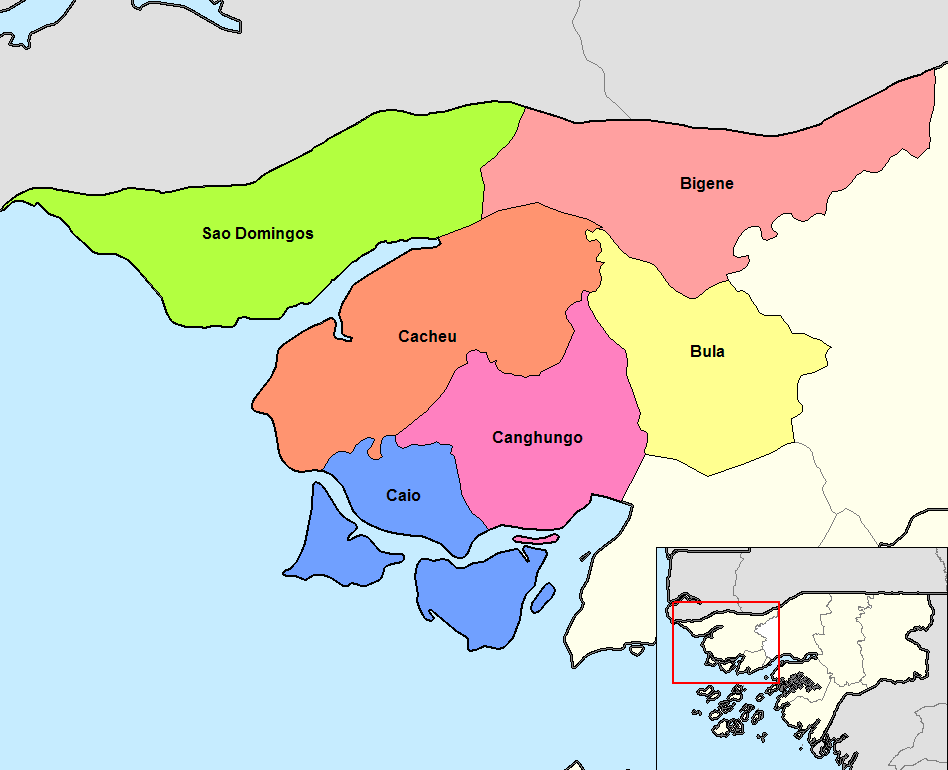
- A map showing the sectors of Guinea-Bissau; Bula is on the far right in yellow.
- Interactive map of Bula
- Coordinates: 12°006′014″N 15°042′029″W
- Country: Guinea-Bissau
- Region: Cacheu

Bula is a Sector in the Cacheu Region of Guinea-Bissau.
