= Lagartos FC =

Guinea-Bissau football club

- Full name: Lagartos Futebol Clube
- Chairman: Adulai Sissé
- Coach: Umaro Turé
- League: Campeonato Nacional da Guiné-Bissau
- 2017/18: 9th
| Home colours | Away colours |

Lagartos Futebol Clube is a Guinea-Bissau football club based in Bambadinca. They currently play in the top domestic Campeonato Nacional da Guiné-Bissau.

Lagartos were finalists in the 2015 Taça Nacional da Guiné Bissau, losing 5–1 to champions Sport Bissau e Benfica.
