= Nuno Tristão FC =

- Full name: Nuno Tristão Futebol Clube da Bula
- Ground: Estádio José Ansumane Queta; Bula, Guinea-Bissau
- League: Campeonato Nacional da Guine-Bissau
- 2023–24: 6th
| Home colours | Away colours |

Nuno Tristão Futebol Clube da Bula is a Guinea-Bissauan football club based in Bula. They play in the Campeonato Nacional da Guine-Bissau.

They were formerly called Bula FC.

== Achievements ==
- Campeonato Nacional da Guiné-Bissau: 1

2014

- Taça Nacional da Guiné Bissau: 1

1978–79

== Stadium ==
Currently the team plays at the Estádio José Ansumane Queta.
