= SC de Bafatá =

Sporting de Bafatá
- Full name: Sporting Clube de Bafatá
- Nickname: Leões de Leste
- Founded: 1937
- Ground: Estadio de Rocha; Bafatá, Guinea-Bissau
- Capacity: 5,000
- Chairman: Marcolino Indjai
- Manager: Adilson Baldé
- League: Campeonato Nacional da Guiné-Bissau
- 2018: 12th
Home colours	Away colours

Sporting Clube de Bafatá is a Guinea-Bissauan football club based in Bafatá. They play in the top division in Guinean football, the Campeonato Nacional da Guiné-Bissau.

== Achievements ==
- Campeonato Nacional da Guiné-Bissau: 2

1987, 2008

== Performance in CAF competitions ==
- CAF Champions League:

2009 – withdraw
