= Sporting de Bissau =

Association football club in Guinea-Bissau

- Former crest of SC Bissau
- Full name: Sporting Clube de Bissau
- Founded: 30 January 1936; 90 years ago
- Ground: Estádio 24 de Setembro
- Capacity: 20,000
- Chairman: Moctar Djaló
- Manager: Mustafá Jaquité
- League: Campeonato Nacional da Guiné-Bissau
- 2025–26: 7th
- Website: www.sportingcgb.com
Home colours	Away colours

Sporting Clube de Bissau, usually known as Sporting de Bissau, is a professional football club from Bissau, Guinea-Bissau.

== History ==
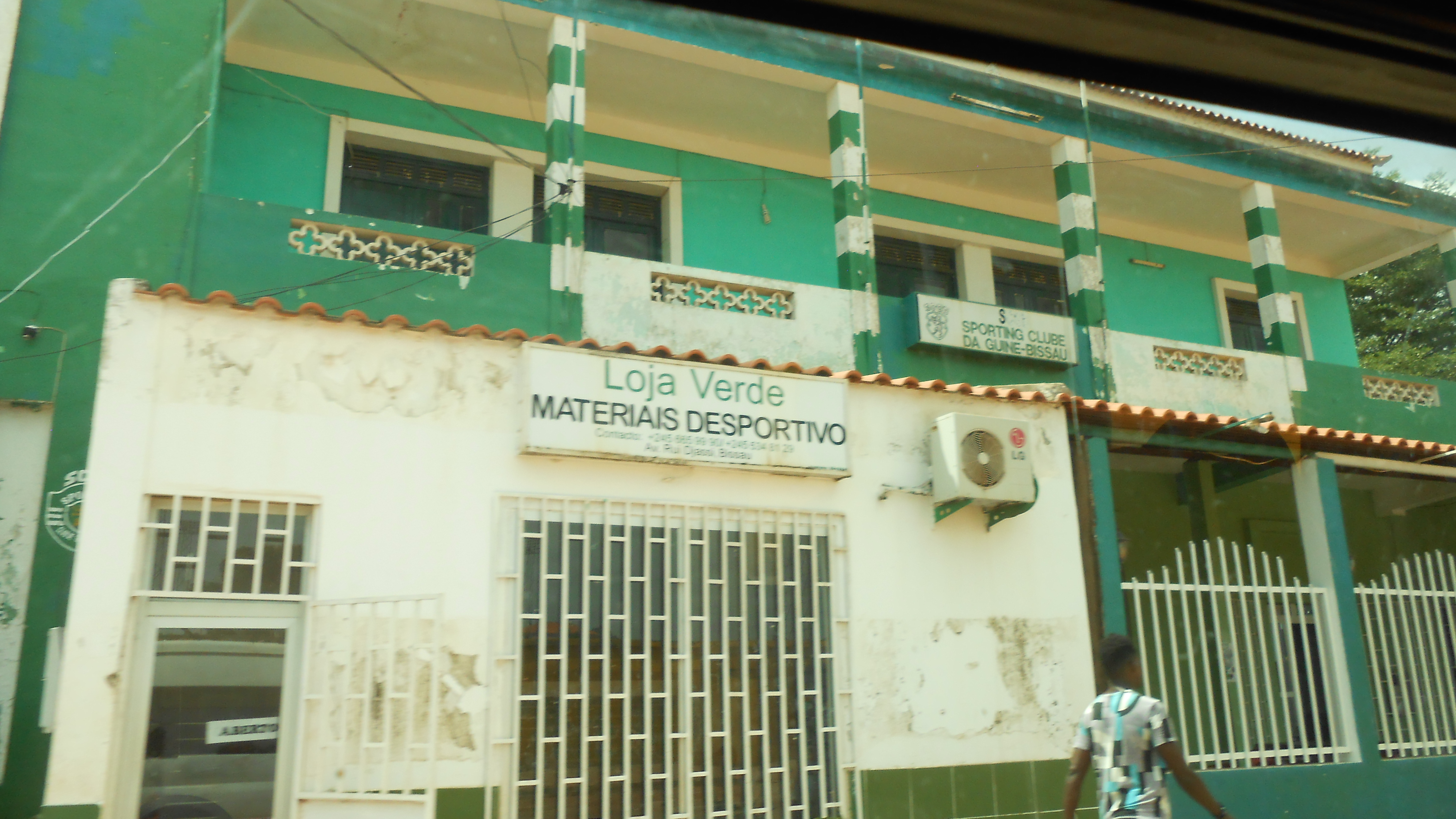
Offices of Sporting Bissau

The club was founded on 30 January 1936 in Bissau, the club named after to that of the Portuguese club Sporting CP of Lisbon and is the 89th affiliate.

In the colonial era, the club competed three times in the Portuguese Cup, SC Braga in 1970, the 1972 edition which was their last appearance reached up to round one and challenged with UD Sintrense and Oriental Lisboa and was later out.

The club has the most number of national championships number 14 titles, their last was won in 2010, it also has 6 cup and 2 super cup titles.

After independence, SC Bissau reached the cup final and won their first title 1982, two more were won in 1986 and 1987. Another was won in 1991 after defeating Benfica Bissau 1–0 in the cup final. Another final chance was played in 1994, they lost 2–1 to Ténis Clube de Bissau, a club now known as Mavegro. Sporting Bissau had their second stint for another title, in the final, they lost to the same club 3–1, a club that became Mavegro. After winning their 2004 championship titile, they made a rematch with Mavegro in the 2004 super cup match and won their first of two super cup titles for the club. Sporting won their recent cup title in 2005 after defeating Bissorã 4–2 in the cup final. Sporting came into their recent super cup appearance in 2005, as they also were national champions, they faced the cup runner up Bissorã and claimed their last super cup title for Sporting.

In 1986, Sporting Bissau celebrated their 50th anniversary of the club's foundation.

In March 2016, Sporting Bissau was in first place with 17 points and 5 matches won, but the season was cancelled after May due to financial problems. Sporting Bissau finished on the edge of the relegation zone for the 2017 season with 11th place, enough to be kept as a First Division club for the following season, this was predominantly their final appearance in the cup final for the club.

=== Continental competitions ===
The club appeared in the African competition seven times, once in the cup competition and six in the African level. As they were national champions, the club did not appear in 1992, the late 1990s, the mid-2000s and 2011. In the 1984 edition after challenging Real de Banjul of the Gambia, Hafia FC withdrew from Round 1 competition, later Sporting itself withdrew during Round 2 competitions from JS Kabylie, Sporting also withdrew from the 1985 edition during Round 1 with Asante Kotoko FC and the 1993 edition during the preliminaries with Étoile Filante Ouagadougou.

== Logo ==
Its logo used the older logo of Sporting CP, now the logo is to that of the modern logo of Sporting CP.

== Uniform ==
Home uniform in mid to late 2008

Its uniform is to that of Sporting CP, its uniform for home games has a white-green striped t-shirt and black shorts, compared to Praia's uniforms of Cape Verde, Sporting Bissau has a green-white striped short sleeves and green socks. Its uniform for away games are colored white and similar to Sporting CP's and Praia's uniform in which Bissau has a green collar and sleeve rim.

Its former uniform used in mid to late 2000s was a green t-shirt with white collar and sleeve edges, a white shorts and green socks for home games.

== Rivalry ==
Sporting Bissau's main rivalry is SB Benfica which is called the Eternal Derby of Bissau (Portuguese: Derby Eterno de Bissau).

== Honours ==
- Campeonato Nacional da Guiné-Bissau: 14

1983, 1984, 1986, 1991, 1992, 1994, 1997, 1998, 2000, 2002, 2004, 2005, 2007, 2021

- Taça Nacional da Guiné Bissau: 6

1976, 1982, 1986, 1987, 1991, 2005

- SuperTaça Nacional da Guiné-Bissau: 2

2004, 2005

== League and cup history ==
=== Performance in CAF competitions ===
Sporting Bissau's results in CAF competition
Season	Competition	Qualification method	Round	Opposition	Home	Away	Aggregate
1977	CAF Cup Winners' Cup	Bissau Guinean cup winners	First round	(Liberia) Cedar United	1–0	1–1	2–1
1977	CAF Cup Winners' Cup	Bissau Guinean cup winners	Second round	(Cameroon) Canon Yaoundé	0–4	7–1	1–11
1984	African Cup of Champions Clubs	Bissau Guinean champions	Preliminary Round	(The Gambia) Real de Banjul	2–0	0–0	2–0
1984	African Cup of Champions Clubs	Bissau Guinean champions	First round	(Guinea) Hafia FC	canc	canc	^{1}
1984	African Cup of Champions Clubs	Bissau Guinean champions	Second round	(Algeria) JS Kabylie	canc.	canc.	^{2}
1985	African Cup of Champions Clubs	Bissau Guinean champions	Preliminary Round	(Mauritania) ASC Garde Nationale	1–2	0–1	2–2 (a)
1987	African Cup of Champions Clubs	Bissau Guinean champions	Preliminary Round	(Sierra Leone) Old Edwardians	canc.	canc.	^{3}
1987	African Cup of Champions Clubs	Bissau Guinean champions	First round	(Ghana) Asante Kotoko	canc.	canc.	^{2}
1993	African Cup of Champions Clubs	Bissau Guinean champions	First round	(Burkina Faso) Étoile Filante Ouagadougou	canc.	canc.	^{2}
2000	CAF Champions League	Bissau Guinean champions	Preliminary Round	(Guinea) Horoya AC	1–1	2–0	1–2
2008	African Cup of Champions Clubs	Bissau Guinean champions	Preliminary Round	(Morocco) OC Khouribga	0–2	0–2	2–2 (a)

1- Hafia FC withdrew
2- SC Bissau withdrew
3- Old Edwardians withdrew

=== Performance at the WAFU Club Championship ===
Sporting Bissau results at the WAFU Club Championship
Season	Competition	Qualification method	Round	Opposition	Home	Away	Aggregate
1986	WAFU Club Championship	First Division Runner-up	Preliminary Round	(Senegal) SEIB Djourbel	0–0	3–0	0–3

=== Provincial era ===
==== The club in the Portuguese football structure ====
- Portuguese Cup: 4 appearances

1970 – 1/8 final: vs SC Braga (1–0, 0–3)
1972 – Round 1: UD Sintrense (0–2)
1972 – Round 1: Oriental Lisboa (0–1)

=== National level ===
Season	Div.	Pos.	Pl.	W	D	L	GS	GA	GD	P	Cup	Notes
2003–04	1	1	18	12	3	3	26	7	+19	39		
2004–05	1	1	22	13	6	3	40	18	+22	45	Winner	
2006	1	4	22	9	4	9	22	27	-5	31		
2010	1	1										
2010–11	1	6										
2013	1	2	18	10	4	4	22	10	+12	34		
2014	1	3	17	7	7	3	21	11	+10	28		
2017	1	11	26	-	-	-	-	-	-	-		

== Statistics ==
- Best position: Second round (continental)
- Best position at cup competitions: Second round (continental)
- Total matches played at the CAF Champions League: 8
  - Total matches played at home: 4
  - Total matches played away: 4
- Total number of wins at the CAF Champions League: 1
- Total draws at the CAF Champions League: 1
- Total number of goals scored at the CAF Champions League: 7
- Total matches played at the continental cup competitions: 2
- Total number of wins at cup competitions: 1
- Total draws at cup competitions: 1
- Total number of goals scored at cup competitions: 3

== Squad ==
Note: Flags indicate national team as defined under FIFA eligibility rules; some limited exceptions apply. Players may hold more than one non-FIFA nationality.

No.	Pos.	Nation	Player
—	DF	GBS	Beto Djaló
—		GBS	Leonardo Sidibé

No.	Pos.	Nation	Player
—		GBS	Carlos Embaló

== See also ==
- List of football clubs in Guinea-Bissau
