= SC Portos de Bissau =

Guinea-Bissauan football club

- Full name: Sport Clube dos Portos de Bissau
- Ground: Guinea-Bissau
- Chairman: Mamadou Lamarana
- Coach: Lassana Djaló
- League: Campeonato Nacional da Guine-Bissau
- 2025–26: 2 nd
Home colours	Away colours

Sport Clube dos Portos de Bissau is a Guinea-Bissauan football club based in Guinea-Bissau. They play in the Campeonato Nacional da Guine-Bissau.

== Achievements ==
- Taça Nacional da Guiné Bissau: 4

1993, 1998, 2000, 2006
