= União Desportiva Internacional de Bissau =

UD Internacional
- Full name: União Desportiva Internacional de Bissau
- Ground: Poadru de Rurtes; Uniao, Guinea-Bissau
- Capacity: 5,000
- Chairman: Romildo Jaquité
- Manager: Gonçalo Djaló
- League: Campeonato Nacional da Guiné-Bissau
- 2025–26: 8th

União Desportiva Internacional de Bissau is a Guinea-Bissauan professional football club based in Uniao. They play in the top domestic division, the Campeonato Nacional da Guine-Bissau.

== Achievements ==
- Campeonato Nacional da Guiné-Bissau: 4

1976, 1985, 2003, 2019

- Taça Nacional da Guiné Bissau: 6

1977, 1983, 1984, 1985, 1988, 1996
