= Sport Bissau e Benfica =

Association football club in Guinea-Bissau

Benfica de Bissau
- Full name: Sport Bissau e Benfica
- Short name: Benfica de Bissau
- Founded: 27 May 1944 (81 years ago)
- Ground: Estadio Lino Correia, Bissau, Guinea-Bissau
- Capacity: 5,000
- Chairman: Filipe Baldé Djaló
- Manager: Francisco Bah Mané
- League: Campeonato Nacional da Guiné-Bissau
- 2024–25: Champions
Home colours	Away colours	Third colours

Sport Bissau e Benfica, commonly known as Benfica de Bissau, is a football club from Bissau, Guinea-Bissau, that plays in the Campeonato Nacional da Guiné-Bissau, the top flight of Bissau-Guinean football. Benfica Bissau is considered to the top clubs of Guinea-Bissau alongside Sporting Bissau. As of 2024, both clubs won the top-flight football league of Guinea-Bissau 14 times. Sport Bissau e Benfica won their 14th title in 2024 in front of hundreds of spectators.

== History ==
The club was founded on 27 May 1944 as the 29th affiliated club of Portuguese club S.L. Benfica.

In its early years, the team was the dominant in the colonial competition. One of its first prominent players of the club was the Cape Verdean Alberto Monteiro, better known as Fialho who later moved to Portugal and played for Portuguese clubs such as S.L. Benfica and Lusitano de Évora.

After independence, the club was one of the first to win a national championship title, in 1982, they won five championship titles, in 1990, they won three more straight titles totaling eight, 20 years later they won another one, they won their tenth in 2015 and is the recent championship winner in 2017. Also at cup competitions, they won their first cup title in 1980, their second was in 1989, their third was in 1992, 16 years later, they won their fourth one and won three straight in 2010. More recently, the club won the 2015 cup, with a 5–1 victory against Lagartos de Bambadinca.

At the continentals, Benfica played after winning their championship title in 1978, they played only in a single round, from the First round up to 1983 and the Preliminaries from 1990. They did not appear at the 1989 edition and recently the 2016 CAF Champions League. At the continental cup competition, they did not play in 1981, they played in 1990 after winning a cup title, they played in the CAF Confederation Cup in 2007, qualified as runner-up, in 2009 and 2010 as cup winner, They missed the 2011 CAF Confederation Cup due to mainly financial concerns. They recently played at the 2018 CAF Champions League after being national First Division champions.

As of 2010, in both continental championship and cup competitions, they never won a match. In a home match at the 1986 Winners' Cup with Starlight of Banjul, Gambia, they made a goal draw.

== Logo ==
Being a Benfica affiliate, the logo owes no relation to the Benfica logo, Benfica Bissau once used the earlier logo. Its logo has an orange shield with the blue seal encircled with the full name of the club and the word futebol (football/soccer) on the right, inside is another shield colored in blue with a crown on top and the two Bs in the middle-bottom.

== Honours ==
- Campeonato Nacional da Guiné-Bissau
  - Champions (15): 1977, 1978, 1980, 1981, 1982, 1988, 1989, 1990, 2010, 2015, 2017, 2018, 2022, 2024, 2025
- Taça Nacional da Guiné Bissau
  - Winners (10): 1980, 1989, 1992, 2008, 2009, 2010, 2015, 2018, 2021, 2022

== Performance in CAF competitions ==
Benfica Bissau's results in CAF competition
Season	Competition	Qualification method	Round	Opposition	Home	Away	Aggregate
1978	African Cup of Champions Clubs	Bissau Guinean championship winners	First round	(Republic of Upper Volta) RC Bobo	2–3	7–0	2–10
1980	African Cup of Champions Clubs	Bissau Guinean championship winners	First round	(Ivory Coast) Stade d'Abidjan	2–3	4–0	2–7
1981	African Cup of Champions Clubs	Bissau Guinean championship winners	First round	(Togo) OC Agaza	canc.	canc.	w/o^{1}
1983	African Cup of Champions Clubs	Bissau Guinean championship winners	First round	(Morocco) KAC Kenitra	canc.	canc.	w/o ^{1}
1986	CAF Cup Winners' Cup	Bissau Guinean cup winners	Preliminary Round	(The Gambia) Starlight F.C.	1–1	3–0	2–4
1990	African Cup of Champions Clubs	Bissau Guinean championship winners	Preliminary Round	(Guinea) AS Kaloum Star	0–2	1–0	0–3
1993	CAF Cup Winners' Cup	Bissau Guinean cup winners	Preliminary Round	(Mauritania) ASC SNIM	canc.	canc.	^{1}
2007	CAF Champions League	Bissau Guinean champions	Preliminary Round	(Guinea) F.C. Satellite	1–3	3–1	2–6
2009	African Cup of Champions Clubs	Bissau Guinean champions	Preliminary Round	(Senegal) ASC Yakaar	1–2	1–0	1–3
2010	African Cup of Champions Clubs	Bissau Guinean champions	Preliminary Round	(Guinea) F.C. Baraka	0–0	2–3	2–3
2018	African Cup of Champions Clubs	Bissau Guinean champions	Preliminary Round	(Morocco) Difaâ El Jadidi	0–10	0–0	0–10

^{1} Benfica Bissau withdrew

== Statistics ==
- Best position: First round (continental)
- Best position at a cup competition: Preliminary Round (continental)
