= List of football clubs in Guinea-Bissau =

The following is an incomplete list of association football clubs based in Guinea-Bissau.

For a complete list see Category:Football clubs in Guinea-Bissau

== A ==
- Académica de Ingoré
- Acaja Club
- ADR Desportivo de Mansabá
- Agril
- Aguias Guine No Lanta
- Ajuda United
- Atlético Clube de Bissorã

== B ==
- FC Babaque - Farim
- Blofib

== C ==
- Caça em Quinhamel
- F.C. Catacumba
- FC Cuntum

== D ==
- Desportivo Quelele
- Desportivo de Biombo
- Djaraf

== E ==
- EN Bolama

== F ==
- Farim

== G ==
- Green Sunrise

== J ==
- Jagudis de Biombo

== M ==
- Mavegro Futebol Clube

== O ==
- Oio Soccer Club
- OS Balantas

== P ==
- Prabis

== Q ==
- Quinara FC

== T ==
- Tite AFC
- Tombali SC

== U ==
- União Desportiva Internacional

== V ==
- F.C.Vitoria Cacheu
