= List of unbeaten football club seasons =

This is a list of unbeaten association football club seasons.

== Men's football ==
=== Africa ===
(National top division only, minimum 18 matches in league calendar)

Season	Nation	Club	Matches	Article	Notes
1962–63	Tunisia	Étoile Sportive du Sahel	22		Also won Tunisian Cup (7 matches); Tunisia's first double
1970	Kenya	Abaluhya Léopards	19		
1972–73	Libya	Al-Ahli Tripoli	21		
1974–75	Libya	Al-Ahli Tripoli	22		
1975–76	Egypt	Al-Ahly	23		
1978–79	Egypt	Al-Ahly	22		
1980–81	Egypt	Zamalek	26		Did not win league title
1985–86	Egypt	Al-Ahly	22		
1986	Kenya	Abaluhya Léopards	38		
1991	Cameroon	Canon Yaoundé	29		
1991	Ivory Coast	ASEC Mimosas	30		
1991	Uganda	KCCA	19		
1993	Central African Republic	Tempête Mocaf	22		
1998–99	Egypt	Al-Ahly	26		
1998	Tunisia	Espérance Sportive de Tunis	28		
1999–2000	Tunisia	Espérance Sportive de Tunis	22		
1999–2000	Swaziland	Mbabane Highlanders	22		
2000–01	Malawi	MTL Wanderers	28		Did not win league title
2001–02	Egypt	Ismaily	26	Yes	
2003–04	Ghana	Accra Hearts of Oak	30		Did not win league title, but they won CAF Confederation Cup
2004	Ivory Coast	ASEC Mimosas	26		
2003–04	Egypt	Zamalek	26		
2004–05	Egypt	Al-Ahly	26		
2005–06	Egypt	Al-Ahly	26		
2006	Gabon	AS Mangasport	26		
2006	Guinea-Bissau	CF Os Balantas	22		
2007	Sudan	Al-Hilal Omdurman	22		
2007–08	Botswana	Centre Chiefs	30		
2007–08	Ethiopia	Saint George	24		
2007–08	Libya	Al-Ittihad Tripoli	30		
2008–09	Burkina Faso	ASFA Yennenga	26		
2009	Senegal	ASC Linguère	18		
2009–10	Malawi	ESCOM United FC	28		Did not win league title
2009–10	Tanzania	Simba	22		
2009–10	Gabon	AS Mangasport	26		
2010–11	Burundi	Atlético Olympic	22		
2012	Congo	CSMD Diables Noirs	29		Did not win league title; lost in the play-off final on penalty shoot-out
2013	São Tomé and Príncipe	Sporting Praia Cruz	18		
2014–15	Gabon	AS Mangasport	24		
2015	Kenya	Gor Mahia	30		
2015–16	DR Congo	TP Mazembe	32		
2015–16	Somalia	Mogadishu City Club	18		
2016–17	Egypt	Al-Ahly	34	Yes	
2016–17	Liberia	LISCR FC	22		
2016–17	Swaziland	Mbabane Swallows	22		
2017	Réunion	JS Saint-Pierroise	26		
2017	Sudan	Al-Hilal Omdurman	34		
2017–18	Eswatini	Mbabane Swallows	26		
2018–19	Sudan	Al-Merrikh	21		
2018–19	Angola	Clube Desportivo 1º de Agosto	30		
2019	Sierra Leone	East End Lions	24		
2019	Liberia	LPRC Oilers	22		
2019–20	Congo	AS Otohô	22		
2020–21	DR Congo	AS Vita Club	30		
2021–22	DR Congo	TP Mazembe	19		
2021–22	Tanzania	Young Africans	35		
2022–23	Liberia	Bea Mountain	26		Did not win league title
2023–24	Morocco	Raja CA	30	Yes	Also won Moroccan Cup (5 matches).

=== Asia ===
(National top division only, minimum 18 matches in league calendar)

Season	Nation	Club	Matches	Article	Notes
1904	Singapore	Band & Drums	26		
1973–74	Iran	Persepolis	22		
1974–75	Lebanon	Nejmeh	22		
1977–78	Hong Kong	South China	22		
1978–79	Hong Kong	Seiko	22		
1980	Vietnam	Tổng cục Đường sắt	12		
1980	Syria	Al-Shorta	18		
1982–83	Iraq	Salahaddin	22		
1982–83	Saudi Arabia	Al-Ettifaq	18		
1983–84	Iraq	Al-Jaish	24		
1984–85	Kuwait	Al-Kuwait	26		Did not win league title
1985	Jordan	Al-Faisaly	22		
1985	Vietnam	Công nghiệp Hà Nam Ninh	16		
1985–86	Hong Kong	South China	18		
1985–86	Hong Kong	Happy Valley	18		Did not win league title
1987–88	Japan	Yamaha Motors	22		
1990–91	Lebanon	Al-Ansar	26		Also won Lebanese FA Cup
1991–92	Lebanon	Al-Ansar	20		Also won Lebanese FA Cup
1993	Kyrgyzstan	Alga Bishkek	32		
1994	Singapore	Perth Kangaroos	18		
1994	Uzbekistan	Neftchi Fergana	30		
1996	China	Dalian Wanda	22		
1998	Tajikistan	Varzob Dushanbe	22		
1998–99	Sri Lanka	Jupiter	19		Did not win league title; finished fifth in the league and did not advance to the play-offs
1998–99	Syria	Al-Jaish	26		
2000	Jordan	Al-Faisaly	18		
2000	Turkmenistan	Köpetdag Aşgabat	20		
2001	Tajikistan	Regar-TadAZ	18		
2003–04	Bahrain	Al-Muharraq	18		
2004	Brunei	DPMM FC	18		
2004–05	Jordan	Al-Wehdat	18		
2004–05	Oman	Dhofar	24		
2005–06	Iraq	Al-Zawraa	19		
2006	Macau	Lam Pak	18		
2006–07	Jordan	Al-Wehdat	18		
2006–07	Syria	Al-Karamah	26		
2007	Uzbekistan	Pakhtakor	30		
2007–08	Pakistan	WAPDA	26		
2009	Uzbekistan	Bunyodkor	30	Yes	
2009–10	Bangladesh	Mohammedan	24		Did not win league title
2009–10	Guam	Quality Distributors	20		Won all 20 matches (perfect season)
2009–10	Lebanon	Al-Ahed	22		
2010	Maldives	VB Sports Club	21		
2010	Nepal	Nepal Police Club	22		
2010	Tajikistan	Istiklol	32		
2010–11	Saudi Arabia	Al-Hilal	26	Yes	Also won Saudi Crown Prince Cup
2011	Laos	MPWT FC	18		
2011	Myanmar	Ayeyawady United	22		Did not win league title
2011–12	Saudi Arabia	Al-Shabab	26		
2012	Maldives	New Radiant	19	Yes	
2012	Thailand	Muangthong United	34		
2012–13	Kuwait	Al-Kuwait	21		
2013	Bhutan	Yeedzin	18		Did not win league title; 8 games in A-Division, 10 games in National League
2013	Maldives	New Radiant	19	Yes	
2013	Tajikistan	Ravshan Kulob	18		
2013	Thailand	Buriram United	32		Also won Thai FA Cup and Thai League Cup
2013–14	Hong Kong	Kitchee	18	Yes	
2013–14	Kuwait	Al-Qadsia	26		
2014	Tajikistan	Istiklol	18	Yes	
2014	Uzbekistan	Pakhtakor	26		
2014–15	Kuwait	Al-Kuwait	26		
2014–15	Saudi Arabia	Al-Ahli	26		Did not win league title
2015	Tajikistan	Istiklol	18	Yes	
2015	Thailand	Buriram United	34	Yes	Also won Thai FA Cup and Thai League Cup
2015–16	Bahrain	Al-Hidd	18		
2015–16	Iraq	Al-Zawraa	24		
2016	Bangladesh	Abahani Limited Dhaka	22		
2016	Macau	Benfica de Macau	18		
2016	Malaysia	Johor Darul Ta'zim	22	Yes	Also won Malaysia FA Cup
2017	Tajikistan	Istiklol	21	Yes	
2017–18	Hong Kong	Kitchee	18	Yes	
2017–18	Lebanon	Al-Ahed	22		Also won Lebanese FA Cup and Lebanese Super Cup
2017–18	Qatar	Al-Duhail	22		
2018	Macau	Benfica de Macau	18		
2018	Singapore	Albirex Niigata Singapore	24	Yes	
2018–19	Guam	NAPA Rovers	21		
2018–19	Oman	Dhofar	26		
2019	Myanmar	Shan United	22		
2019	Philippines	Ceres-Negros	24	Yes	Also won and went undefeated in Copa Paulino Alcantara
2020–21	Kuwait	Al-Arabi	18		
2020–21	Qatar	Al-Sadd	22	Yes	Also won Emir of Qatar Cup and Qatar Cup
2021	Macau	Chao Pak Kei	18		
2021–22	Bahrain	Riffa	18		
2021–22	Iran	Esteghlal	30	Yes	
2021–22	Lebanon	Al-Ahed	19		
2021–22	Palestine	Shabab Al-Khalil	22		
2021–22	Qatar	Al-Sadd	22	Yes	
2022	Laos	Young Elephants	18		
2022	Bhutan	Paro	18		
2022	Malaysia	Johor Darul Ta'zim	22	Yes	Also won Malaysia FA Cup and Malaysia Cup
2023	Malaysia	Johor Darul Ta'zim	22	Yes	Also won Malaysia FA Cup and Malaysia Cup
2023	Turkmenistan	Arkadag	24		Won all 24 matches (perfect season), but are suspected of match-fixing. Also won the Turkmenistan Cup.
2023–24	Hong Kong	Lee Man	20		
2023–24	Saudi Arabia	Al-Hilal	34	Yes	Also won King's Cup and Super Cup
2024–25	Malaysia	Johor Darul Ta'zim	24	Yes	Also won Malaysia FA Cup and Malaysia Cup
2025–26	Saudi Arabia	Al-Hilal	34	Yes	Did not win league title, but won King's Cup
2025–26	Kuwait	Al-Kuwait	23		Also won AFC Challenge League
2025–26	Malaysia	Johor Darul Ta'zim	24	Yes	Also won Malaysia FA Cup and Malaysia Cup

=== Europe ===
AC Milan
Under manager Fabio Capello, AC Milan went undefeated throughout all of their 34 matches in the league to capture the 1991–92 Serie A, and went unbeaten between 1991 and 1993, an Italian record of 58 league matches in total.

Arsenal
Arsenal won the 2003–04 Premier League title, finishing undefeated under manager Arsène Wenger, and went unbeaten for a total of 49 consecutive matches in the league between 2003 and 2004.

Juventus
Under manager Antonio Conte, Juventus won the 2011–12 Serie A undefeated, becoming the first team to do so in a 38–game league season in Italy. Overall, in that season the team set a national record of 42 official matches unbeaten including the Italian Cup campaign, in which they reached the final. Finally, Juventus went unbeaten during 49 league matches between September 2011 and November 2012.

Bayer Leverkusen
Bayer Leverkusen under manager Xabi Alonso won the 2023–24 Bundesliga undefeated, winning 28 matches and drawing six. When they finished the league season, they were on a European record 51-match unbeaten run across all competitions where the streak stopped after losing in UEFA Europa League final against Atalanta. They also won the DFB-Pokal, with a perfect record of six wins, to achieve their first double in their history.

(National top division only, minimum 18 matches in league calendar)

Season	Nation	Club	Matches	Article	Notes
1888–89	England	Preston North End	22	Yes	Also won FA Cup. Became known as The Invincibles
1897–98	Scotland	Celtic	18	Yes	
1898–99	Scotland	Rangers	18	Yes	Won all 18 matches (perfect season)
1905–06	Belgium	Union SG	18		
1907–08	Belgium	Racing Club de Bruxelles	18		
1908–09	Belgium	Union SG	22		
1912–13	Austria	Rapid Wien	18		
1912–13	Italy	Pro Vercelli	21		
1913–14	Hungary	MTK	18		Also won Magyar Kupa
1917–18	Hungary	MTK	22		
1918–19	Netherlands	Ajax	30		Includes 22 matches in the regional league Eerste Klasse West-A and 8 in the national championship playoff round.
1922–23	Italy	Genoa	28		
1924–25	Republic of Ireland	Shamrock Rovers	18		Also won FAI Cup and League of Ireland Shield
1926–27	Republic of Ireland	Shamrock Rovers	18		Also won League of Ireland Shield and Leinster Senior Cup
1926–27	Northern Ireland	Belfast Celtic	22		
1928–29	Northern Ireland	Belfast Celtic	26		
1929–30	Spain	Athletic Bilbao	18		Also won Copa del Rey
1931–32	Spain	Real Madrid	18	Yes	
1931–32	Hungary	Ferencváros	22		Won all 22 matches (perfect season)
1933–34	Belgium	Union SG	26		
1934–35	Austria	Rapid Wien	22		
1935–36	Hungary	MTK	26		
1937	Albania	Tirana	18		
1939–40	Luxembourg	Stade Dudelange	18		
1939–40	Switzerland	Servette	22		
1942–43	Germany	Dresdner SC	23		Won all 18 matches in the regional Gauliga Sachsen and 5 in the German championship
1943–44	Bohemia and Moravia	Sparta Prague	26		
1948–49	Bulgaria	Levski Sofia	18		Also won Bulgarian Cup
1949–50	Sweden	Malmö	22		
1950	Yugoslavia	Hajduk Split	18	Yes	
1951	Albania	Dinamo Tirana	26		Also won Albanian Cup
1951	Bulgaria	Spartak Sofia	22		Did not win league title
1952	Hungary	Honvéd	26		
1954	Albania	Partizani	22		
1954–55	Greece	Olympiacos	20		Includes 10 matches in the regional Piraeus league, Enosi Podosferikon Somation Pireos, and 10 in the national championship playoff round.
1955	Albania	Dinamo Tirana	30		
1958–59	Austria	Wiener Sport-Club	26		
1962–63	Luxembourg	Jeunesse Esch	22		
1963–64	Greece	Panathinaikos	30		
1963–64	Albania	Partizani	22		Also won Albanian Cup
1966	Hungary	Vasas	26		
1970–71	Luxembourg	Union Luxembourg	22		
1972–73	Portugal	Benfica	30	Yes	
1976–77	Malta	Floriana	18		
1977–78	Portugal	Benfica	30	Yes	Did not win league title
1978	Iceland	Valur	18		
1978–79	Italy	Perugia	30	Yes	Did not win league title
1980–81	Northern Ireland	Glentoran	22		
1982–83	East Germany	Berliner FC Dynamo	26		
1984–85	Cyprus	Omonia	26		
1985–86	Turkey	Galatasaray	36	Yes	Did not win league title
1986–87	Romania	Steaua București	34		Also won Cupa României
1987–88	Romania	Steaua București	34		Also won Cupa României
1988–89	Romania	Steaua București	34		Also won Cupa României
1989	Faroe Islands	B71 Sandoy	18		
1991	Georgia	Iberia Tbilisi	19		
1991–92	Romania	Dinamo București	34	Yes	
1991–92	Italy	AC Milan	34	Yes	
1991–92	Malta	Valletta	22		
1991–92	Turkey	Beşiktaş	30	Yes	
1992–93	Macedonia	Vardar	34	Yes	Also won Macedonian Cup
1992–93	Estonia	Norma	22		
1993	Armenia	Ararat Yerevan	28		Also won Armenian Cup
1993–94	Israel	Maccabi Haifa	39	Yes	
1994	Armenia	Shirak	28		
1994	Latvia	Skonto	22		
1994–95	Netherlands	Ajax	34	Yes	Also won UEFA Champions League undefeated
1994–95	Macedonia	Vardar	30	Yes	Also won Macedonian Cup
1994–95	Estonia	Flora	24		Also won Estonian Cup
1995	Latvia	Skonto	28		Also won Latvian Cup
1995–96	Armenia	Pyunik	22		Also won Armenian Cup
1995–96	Macedonia	Sileks	28		
1995–96	Cyprus	APOEL	26		Also won Cypriot Cup
1995–96	Poland	Widzew Łódź	34		
1996–97	Luxembourg	Jeunesse Esch	22		Also won Luxembourg Cup
1997	Latvia	Skonto	24		Also won Latvian Cup
1997–98	Andorra	Principat	20		Also won Copa Constitució
1997–98	Azerbaijan	Kapaz	26		Also won Azerbaijan Cup
1997–98	Wales	Barry Town	38		
1998–99	FR Yugoslavia	Partizan	24	Yes	
1998–99	FR Yugoslavia	Obilić	24		Did not win league title
1998–99	Andorra	Principat	22		Also won Copa Constitució
1998–99	Lithuania	Žalgiris Vilnius	23		
2000	Estonia	Levadia	28		Also won Estonian Cup and Estonian Supercup
2001–02	Ukraine	Shakhtar Donetsk	26		Also won Ukrainian Cup
2003	Armenia	Pyunik	28		
2003	Estonia	Flora	28		
2003–04	England	Arsenal	38	Yes	Became known as The Invincibles
2004–05	Serbia and Montenegro	Partizan	30	Yes	
2005–06	Cyprus	Apollon Limassol	26		
2006–07	Ukraine	Dynamo Kyiv	30		Also won Ukrainian Cup
2006–07	Moldova	Sheriff Tiraspol	36		
2007–08	Serbia	Red Star Belgrade	33		Did not win league title
2007–08	Bulgaria	CSKA Sofia	30	Yes	
2007–08	Cyprus	Anorthosis Famagusta	32		
2009–10	Czech Republic	Sparta Prague	30	Yes	
2009–10	Serbia	Partizan	30	Yes	
2009–10	Andorra	Santa Coloma	20		
2009–10	Gibraltar	Lincoln Red Imps	18		Also won Rock Cup
2010	Norway	Rosenborg	30	Yes	Also won Superfinalen
2010–11	Portugal	Porto	30	Yes	Also won Supertaça Cândido de Oliveira, UEFA Europa League, and Taça de Portugal
2010–11	Gibraltar	Lincoln Red Imps	20		Also won Rock Cup
2010–11	Malta	Valletta	28		
2011–12	Italy	Juventus	38	Yes	
2011–12	Hungary	Debrecen	30	Yes	Also won Magyar Kupa
2011–12	Gibraltar	Lincoln Red Imps	20		
2012–13	Portugal	Porto	30	Yes	
2014	Iceland	Stjarnan	22		
2014–15	Croatia	Dinamo Zagreb	36	Yes	Also won Croatian Cup
2014–15	Ukraine	Dynamo Kyiv	26	Yes	Also won Ukrainian Cup
2016–17	Scotland	Celtic	38	Yes	Also won Scottish Cup and Scottish League Cup
2018	Estonia	Nõmme Kalju	36		
2018–19	Greece	PAOK	30	Yes	Also won Greek Cup
2020	Republic of Ireland	Shamrock Rovers	18		Season shortened from 36 games due to COVID-19 pandemic
2020–21	Scotland	Rangers	38	Yes	
2020–21	Serbia	Red Star Belgrade	38	Yes	Also won Serbian Cup
2020–21	Czech Republic	Slavia Prague	34	Yes	Also won Czech Cup
2021–22	Gibraltar	Lincoln Red Imps	20		Also won Rock Cup
2022	Faroe Islands	KÍ Klaksvík	27		
2022–23	Serbia	Red Star Belgrade	37	Yes	Also won Serbian Cup
2023–24	Wales	The New Saints	32		Also won Welsh League Cup
2023–24	Germany	Bayer Leverkusen	34	Yes	Also won DFB-Pokal
2024–25	Moldova	Sheriff Tiraspol	24	Yes	Did not win league title
2024–25	Ukraine	Dynamo Kyiv	30	Yes	
2025	Faroe Islands	KÍ Klaksvík	27		
2025–26	Portugal	Benfica	34	Yes	Did not win league title, but won Supertaça Cândido de Oliveira. First European unbeaten team to finish third in a league.

=== North America, Central America and Caribbean ===
(National top division only, minimum 18 matches in league calendar)

Season	Nation	Club	Matches	Article	Notes
1969–70	Honduras	Olimpia	27		
1976	Guatemala	Comunicaciones	31		Did not win league title
1987	Cuba	Sports Club Villa	22		
1995–96	Bermuda	North Village Rams	18		Did not win league title
2003	El Salvador	C.D. Fas	18		
2003	Canada	Ottawa Wizards	18		
2003–04	Guadeloupe	Gosier	26		Did not win league title
2005	Grenada	Fontenoy United	18		Did not win league title
2006–07	Antigua and Barbuda	Bassa	18		
2011–12	Curaçao	Centro Dominguito	28		
2013–14	Antigua and Barbuda	SAP	18		
2015	Curaçao	Centro Dominguito	27		
2017	Cuba	Santiago de Cuba	22		
2017 Ap.	El Salvador	Alianza	27		
2022–23	Honduras	Olimpia	27		
2022–23	Bahamas	Western Warriors	18		
2022–23	French Guiana	Étoile Matoury	19		
2023–24	Bahamas	Western Warriors	20		
2023–24	French Guiana	Étoile Matoury	26		
2024	Guyana	Guyana Defence Force	18		
2024	Guyana	Slingerz	18		Did not win league title

=== Oceania ===
(National top division only, minimum 18 matches in league calendar)

Season	Nation	Club	Matches	Article	Notes
1994	New Zealand	Napier City Rovers	22		
2001	Fiji	Ba	20		
2004	Fiji	Ba	18		
2009	Fiji	Lautoka	18		
2014	New Caledonia	Magenta	22		
2015–16	French Polynesia	AS Tefana	23		
2016	Vanuatu	Erakor Golden Star	19		
2019	Tonga	Veitongo	21		
2022	American Samoa	Ilaoa and To'omata	20		

=== South America ===
(National top division only, minimum 18 matches in league calendar)

Season	Nation	Club	Matches	Article	Notes
1907	Argentina	Alumni	20		
1915	Argentina	Racing	24		
1917	Uruguay	Nacional	18		
1918	Argentina	Racing	19		Won all matches (perfect season)
1925	Argentina	Racing	24		
1926	Argentina	Independiente	25		
1949	Uruguay	Peñarol	18		Won all matches (perfect season)
1954	Uruguay	Peñarol	18		
1964	Uruguay	Peñarol	18		
1967	Uruguay	Peñarol	18		
1968	Argentina	San Lorenzo	22		
1968	Uruguay	Peñarol	18		
1975	Uruguay	Peñarol	22		
1977	Brazil	Atlético Mineiro	21		Did not win league title
1977	Brazil	Botafogo	18		Did not win league title
1978	Uruguay	Peñarol	22		
1979	Brazil	Internacional	23		
1982	Argentina	Ferro Carril Oeste	22		
1993	Paraguay	Olimpia	22		
1994 Ap.	Argentina	River Plate	19		
1998 Ap.	Argentina	Boca Juniors	19		
2011 Ap.	Argentina	Boca Juniors	19		
2013 Cl.	Paraguay	Cerro Porteño	22		
2019 Ap.	Paraguay	Olimpia	22		

== Women's football ==
=== Africa ===
(National top division only, minimum 12 matches in league calendar)

Season	Nation	Club	Matches	Article	Notes

=== Asia ===
(National top division only, minimum 12 matches in league calendar)

Season	Nation	Club	Matches	Article	Notes
1991	Japan	Nippon TV Beleza	18		
1992	Japan	Nippon TV Beleza	18		
1995	Japan	Iga FC Kunoichi Mie	18		
2005	Japan	Nippon TV Tokyo Verdy Beleza	21		
2011	Japan	INAC Kobe Leonessa	18		
2011–12	Australia	Canberra United	12	Yes	
2012	Japan	INAC Kobe Leonessa	18		
2015–16	Australia	Melbourne City	14	Yes	
2016–17	Lebanon	SAS	14		
2019	South Korea	Incheon Hyundai Steel Red Angels	30		
2019–20	Australia	Melbourne City	14		
2021	China	Wuhan Jianghan University	14		
2022–23	Lebanon	SAS	16		
2023–24	Lebanon	BFA	18		Won all 18 matches (perfect season)
2024–25	Australia	Melbourne City	23	Yes	

=== Europe ===
(National top division only, minimum 12 matches in league calendar)

Season	Nation	Club	Matches	Article	Notes
1968	Italy	Bologna	18		
1969	Italy	ACF Roma	18		
1973	Italy	Gamma 3 Padova	12		
1977	Italy	Diadora Valdobbiadene	22		
1978	Italy	Jolly Catania	22		
1980	Italy	Lazio CF Lubiam	18		
1985–86	Hungary	László Kórház	18		
1987–88	Italy	Lazio CF	30		
1988–89	Hungary	László Kórház	18		
1989–90	Italy	Reggiana Refrattari Zambelli	30		
1990–91	Hungary	Femina	20		
1990–91	Italy	Reggiana Refrattari Zambelli	28		
1991–92	Hungary	Renova Spartacus	18		
1992–93	Hungary	László Kórház	22		Did not win league title
1992–93	Italy	Reggiana Refrattari Zambelli	30		
1993–94	Hungary	László Kórház	24		
1994–95	England	Arsenal	18		
1995–96	England	Croydon	18		
1996–97	Hungary	Femina	18		
1998	Norway	Asker	18		Won all 18 matches (perfect season)
1998–99	England	Croydon	18		
1998–99	Hungary	László Kórház	18		
1998–99	Lithuania	Politechnika-Sika	16		
2000–01	England	Arsenal	18		
2001	Lithuania	Ukmergė	12		
2001	Norway	Trondheims-Ørn	22		Also won Norwegian Cup
2001–02	Italy	Ruco Line Lazio	26		
2002	Lithuania	TexTilite Ukmergė	12		Won all 12 matches (perfect season), also won 2002 Lithuanian Women's Cup
2003–04	Scotland	Hibernian	18		
2004–05	England	Arsenal	18		
2005	Sweden	Umeå IK	22		
2005–06	England	Arsenal	18		
2005–06	Italy	Fiammamonza	22		
2005–06	Scotland	Hibernian	22		
2006	Sweden	Umeå IK	22		
2006–07	England	Arsenal	22		Won all 22 matches (perfect season) and also won the FA Cup, the FAWPL Cup, and the 2007 UEFA Women's Cup final.
2006–07	Hungary	Femina	24		
2006–07	Scotland	Hibernian	22		Won all 22 matches (perfect season); Also won Scottish Cup
2007	Lithuania	Gintra Universitetas	12		Won all 12 matches (perfect season), also won 2007 Lithuanian Women's Cup
2007–08	England	Arsenal	22		
2007–08	Hungary	Femina	28		
2008	Lithuania	Gintra Universitetas	12		Consequently won all 12 matches (2nd perfect season), also won 2008 Lithuanian Women's Cup
2008–09	Italy	Bardolino Verona	22		
2008–09	Greece	PAOK	16		
2009–10	Italy	Torres	22		
2009–10	Greece	PAOK	22		
2010	Lithuania	Gintra Universitetas	12		Won all 12 matches (perfect season), also won 2010 Lithuanian Women's Cup
2010	Norway	Stabæk	22		
2010	Scotland	Glasgow City	22		
2010–11	Czech Republic	Sparta Prague	16		
2010–11	Greece	PAOK	24		Won all 24 matches (perfect season)
2010–11	Italy	Torres	26		
2011	Scotland	Glasgow City	20		Won all 20 matches (perfect season); Also won Scottish Cup
2011–12	Czech Republic	Sparta Prague	20		
2011–12	Switzerland	Zürich Frauen	25		
2012	Lithuania	Gintra Universitetas	12		Won all 12 matches (perfect season), also won 2012 Lithuanian Women's Cup
2012–13	Czech Republic	Sparta Prague	20		
2012–13	Denmark	Brøndby IF	24		
2012–13	Hungary	MTK Hungária	26		
2012–13	Switzerland	Zürich Frauen	25		
2013	Scotland	Glasgow City	21		Also won Scottish Cup; Also won SWPL Cup
2013–14	Ireland	Raheny United	21		
2014	Lithuania	Gintra Universitetas	18		Won all 18 matches (perfect season), also won 2014 Lithuanian Women's Cup
2014–15	France	Lyon	22		
2014–15	Germany	Bayern Munich	22		
2014–15	Greece	PAOK	18		Also won Greek Cup
2014–15	Turkey	Konak Belediyespor	19		
2015	Lithuania	Gintra Universitetas	16		Consequently won all 16 matches (2nd perfect season), also won 2015 Lithuanian Women's Cup
2015	Scotland	Glasgow City	21		Also won Scottish Cup; Also won SWPL Cup
2015–16	Bulgaria	NSA Sofia	18		
2015–16	France	Lyon	22		
2015–16	Greece	PAOK	18		Also won Greek Cup
2015–16	Hungary	Ferencváros	22		
2015–16	Wales	Cardiff Met	20		
2016	Faroe Islands	KÍ Klaksvík	20		
2016	Ireland	Shelbourne	12		
2016	Lithuania	Gintra Universitetas	20		Consequently won all 20 matches (3rd perfect season), also won 2016 Lithuanian Women's Cup
2016	Norway	LSK Kvinner	22		
2016	Sweden	Linköpings FC	22		
2016–17	Austria	SKN St. Pölten	18		
2016–17	Czech Republic	Slavia Prague	20		
2016–17	Denmark	Brøndby IF	23		
2016–17	Greece	PAOK	16		Won all 16 matches (perfect season), also won Greek Cup
2016–17	Portugal	Sporting CP	26		
2016–17	Spain	Atlético Madrid	30		
2017	Scotland	Glasgow City	21		
2017–18	Bulgaria	NSA Sofia	20		Won all 20 matches (perfect season)
2017–18	England	Chelsea	18		
2017–18	France	Lyon	22		
2017–18	Portugal	Sporting CP	22		
2017–18	Turkey	Ataşehir Belediyespor	18		
2018	Lithuania	Gintra Universitetas	16		Won all 16 matches (perfect season)
2017–18	Ukraine	Zhytlobud-1 Kharkiv	18		
2018	Scotland	Glasgow City	21		
2018–19	Bulgaria	NSA Sofia	18		Won all 18 matches (perfect season)
2018–19	Czech Republic	Sparta Prague	20		Also won Czech Women's Cup
2018–19	France	Lyon	22		Treble
2018–19	Greece	PAOK	20		Won all 20 matches (perfect season)
2018–19	Portugal	Braga	22		
2018–19	Ukraine	Zhytlobud-1 Kharkiv	18		Won all 18 matches (perfect season), also won Ukrainian Women's Cup
2018–19	Wales	Cardiff Met	16		Also won FAW Women's Cup
2019	Iceland	Valur	18		Also won Icelandic Women's Football Super Cup
2019	Iceland	Breiðablik	18		Did not win league title
2019	Lithuania	Gintra Universitetas	16		Consequently won all 16 matches (2nd perfect season), also won 2019 Women's Baltic Football League
2019–20	Belgium	Anderlecht	16		
2019–20	Czech Republic	Slavia Prague	13		
2019–20	England	Chelsea	15		Also won FA Women's League Cup
2019–20	Germany	VfL Wolfsburg	22		Also won DFB-Pokal Frauen
2019–20	Italy	Juventus	16	Yes	Season curtailed due to COVID-19 pandemic. Juventus declared champions by FIGC.
2019–20	Spain	Barcelona	21		Season curtailed due to COVID-19 pandemic. Barcelona declared champions by RFEF.
2019–20	Greece	PAOK	14		Won all 14 matches (perfect season)
2020	Faroe Islands	KÍ Klaksvík	20		Also won Faroese Women's Cup
2020	Lithuania	Gintra Universitetas	20		Consequently won all 20 matches (3rd perfect season)
2020	Norway	Rosenborg	18		Did not win league title
2020–21	Albania	Vllaznia	22		Won all 22 matches (perfect season), also won Albanian Women's Cup
2020–21	Bulgaria	NSA Sofia	26		Won all 26 matches (perfect season), also won Bulgarian Women's Cup
2020–21	Croatia	Osijek	20		
2020–21	Croatia	Split	20		Did not win league title, but won Croatian Cup
2020–21	France	Paris Saint-Germain	22		
2020–21	Italy	Juventus	22	Yes	Won all 22 matches (perfect season), and also won Supercoppa Italiana
2020–21	Romania	U Olimpia Cluj	21		Also won Romanian Women's Cup
2020–21	Ukraine	Zhytlobud-1 Kharkiv	19		
2020–21	Wales	Swansea City	16		
2021	Lithuania	Gintra Universitetas	20		Consequently won all 20 matches (4th perfect season)
2021	Norway	Sandviken	18		
2021–22	Denmark	HB Køge	24		
2021–22	Scotland	Rangers	27		
2021–22	Albania	Vllaznia	20		Also won Albanian Women's Cup
2021–22	Greece	PAOK	20		
2021–22	France	Lyon	22		Also won 2021–22 UEFA Women's Champions League
2021–22	Spain	Barcelona	30	Yes	Won all 30 matches (perfect season) and also won Copa de la Reina and Supercopa de España. They lost their streak in the 2022 UEFA Women's Champions League final.
2022	Lithuania	Gintra Universitetas	20		Also won 2022 Women's Baltic Football League
2022–23	Czech Republic	Slavia Prague	20		Also won Czech Women's Cup
2022–23	Albania	Vllaznia	18		Won all 18 matches (perfect season), also won Albanian Women's Cup
2022–23	Hungary	Ferencváros	22		
2022–23	Wales	Cardiff City	20		Also won FAW Women's Cup
2023	Lithuania	Gintra Universitetas	24		Also won 2023 Women's Baltic Football League
2023–24	Germany	Bayern Munich	22	Yes	
2023–24	Greece	PAOK	26		Also won Greek Cup
2023–24	Spain	Barcelona	30	Yes	Also won Copa de la Reina and 2023–24 UEFA Women's Champions League.
2024–25	England	Chelsea	22	Yes	Also won 2024–25 Women's FA Cup and 2024–25 Women's League Cup
2024–25	France	Lyon	22	Yes	Completed the regular season (22 matches) unbeaten and also won both postseason playoff matches
2025–26	France	Lyon	22	Yes	Completed the regular season (22 matches) unbeaten, won both postseason playoff matches and also won the Coupe de France Féminine and the Coupe LFFP
2025–26	Germany	Bayern Munich	22	Yes	Also won DFB-Pokal Frauen
2025–26	Greece	PAOK	26		Also won Greek Cup

=== North America, Central America and Caribbean ===
(National top division only, minimum 12 matches in league calendar)

Season	Nation	Club	Matches	Article	Notes

=== Oceania ===
(National top division only, minimum 12 matches in league calendar)

Season	Nation	Club	Matches	Article	Notes
2024	New Zealand	Auckland United	31		

=== South America ===
(National top division only, minimum 12 matches in league calendar)

Season	Nation	Club	Matches	Article	Notes
2000	Argentina	Boca Juniors	28		
2002 Ap.	Argentina	River Plate	13		
2011	Uruguay	Nacional	18		
2014	Brazil	Ferroviária	14		
2016	Argentina	UAI Urquiza	18		
2019	Uruguay	Peñarol	18		
2020	Uruguay	Peñarol	13		
2022	Uruguay	Nacional	16		

== See also ==
- Longest unbeaten runs
- Perfect season
