= 2017–18 Kategoria Superiore Femra =

Kategoria Superiore Femra
- Season: 2017–18
- Dates: 30 September 2017 – 19 May 2018
- Champions: Vllaznia (5th title)
- Champions League: Vllaznia
- Matches: 110
- Goals: 734 (6.67 per match)
- Top goalscorer: Megi Doçi (70)
- Biggest home win: Kinostudio 27–0 Bilisht Sport (11 November 2017)
- Biggest away win: Bilisht Sport 0–19 Apolonia (6 December 2017)
- Highest scoring: Kinostudio 27–0 Bilisht Sport (11 November 2017)
- Longest winning run: 20 matches Vllaznia
- Longest unbeaten run: 20 matches Vllaznia
- Longest winless run: 20 matches Bilisht Sport
- Longest losing run: 20 matches Bilisht Sport

The 2017–18 Kategoria Superiore Femra was the 9th season of women's professional football, organized by the Albanian Football Federation.

Vllaznia secured their fifth league title on 28 April 2018 following an 11–0 victory over Bilisht Sport.

Locations of teams from the 2017–18 season

== League table ==
Pos	Team	Pld	W	D	L	GF	GA	GD	Pts
1	Vllaznia (Note: Vllaznia qualified to the UEFA Champions League qualifying round.) (C)	20	20	0	0	131	1	+130	60
2	Tirana AS	20	15	2	3	98	20	+78	47
3	Kinostudio	20	15	1	4	129	30	+99	46
4	Apolonia	20	14	1	5	124	19	+105	43
5	Teuta	20	12	2	6	62	44	+18	38
6	AAS	20	10	0	10	60	42	+18	30
7	Juban Danja	20	9	0	11	57	59	−2	27
8	Skënderbeu	20	6	0	14	28	89	−61	18
9	Dajti	20	4	0	16	22	113	−91	12
10	Pogradeci	20	2	0	18	19	138	−119	6
11	Bilisht Sport	20	0	0	20	4	179	−175	0

Updated to match(es) played on 19 May 2018. Source:
(C) Champions

== Results ==
Home \ Away	AAS	APF	BIL	DAJ	JUB	KIN	POG	SKË	TEU	TAS	VLL
Albanian Ajax School	—	1–4	7–1	7–0	2–1	0–2	13–0	2–0	2–3	1–2	0–3
Apolonia Fier	3–1	—	11–0	8–0	6–1	5–2	18–0	9–0	4–0	0–0	0–1
Bilisht Sport	0–3	0–19	—	0–5	0–10	0–10	0–3	1–10	1–10	0–6	0–11
Dajti	0–4	0–9	8–0	—	0–7	1–10	1–0	1–4	0–5	1–7	0–11
Juban Danja	0–3	1–0	4–0	5–1	—	2–6	4–2	1–0	2–3	3–6	0–6
Kinostudio	5–1	3–1	27–0	5–0	6–2	—	13–1	12–2	2–0	2–1	0–5
Pogradeci	0–6	1–12	7–1	1–2	1–9	0–11	—	0–2	1–5	0–6	0–5
Skënderbeu Korçë	1–6	0–9	3–0	3–1	0–3	0–10	2–1	—	1–3	0–3	0–6
Teuta Durrës	4–1	1–5	5–0	4–0	4–2	1–1	7–1	6–0	—	0–5	0–8
Tirana AS	2–0	2–0	13–0	17–1	6–0	2–1	12–0	7–0	1–1	—	0–4
Vllaznia Shkodër	10–0	5–0	7–0	6–0	7–0	6–1	9–0	8–0	7–0	6–0	—

Updated to match(es) played on 19 May 2018. Source: Soccerway
Legend: Blue = home team win; Yellow = draw; Red = away team win.
For upcoming matches, an "a" indicates there is an article about the rivalry between the two participants.
