= 2020–21 Kategoria Superiore Femra =

Kategoria Superiore Femra
- Season: 2020–21
- Dates: 7 November 2020 – 23 May 2021
- Champions: Vllaznia
- Champions League: Vllaznia
- Matches: 132
- Goals: 945 (7.16 per match)
- Top goalscorer: Megi Doçi (64)
- Biggest home win: Tirana AS 23–0 Bilisht Sport (21 November 2020)
- Biggest away win: Bilisht Sport 0–21 Apolonia (14 November 2020)
- Highest scoring: Tirana AS 23–0 Bilisht Sport (21 November 2020)
- Longest winning run: 22 matches Vllaznia
- Longest unbeaten run: 22 matches Vllaznia
- Longest winless run: 22 matches Bilisht Sport
- Longest losing run: 17 matches Bilisht Sport

The 2020–21 Kategoria Superiore Femra was the 12th season of women's professional football, organized by the Albanian Football Federation.

Locations of teams from the 2020–21 season

== League table ==
Pos	Team	Pld	W	D	L	GF	GA	GD	Pts
1	Vllaznia (Note: Vllaznia qualified to the UEFA Champions League first round.) (C)	22	22	0	0	160	7	+153	66
2	Apolonia	22	17	3	2	136	12	+124	54
3	Tirana	22	15	5	2	129	22	+107	50
4	Tirana AS	22	14	3	5	115	43	+72	45
5	Juban Danja	22	13	2	7	85	37	+48	41
6	Partizani	22	12	1	9	82	53	+29	37
7	Kinostudio	22	12	0	10	121	69	+52	36
8	Teuta	22	7	0	15	53	115	−62	21
9	Skënderbeu (Note: Skënderbeu were deducted 3 points, after failing to show up in a match against Vllaznia.)	22	6	0	16	42	95	−53	15
10	AAS	22	5	0	17	14	132	−118	15
11	Lushnja (Note: Lushnja were deducted 3 points, after failing to show up in a match against Apolonia.)	22	1	1	20	7	136	−129	1
12	Bilisht Sport	22	0	1	21	1	224	−223	1

Updated to match(es) played on 23 May 2021. Source: FSHF
(C) Champions

== Results ==
Home \ Away	AAS	APF	BIL	JUB	KIN	LUS	PAR	SKË	TEU	TIR	TAS	VLL
AAS	—	0–5	6–0	0–8	0–7	2–0	0–4	2–1	1–3	0–2	1–8	0–9
Apolonia	14–0	—	18–0	4–0	8–1	3–0	2–0	10–0	13–0	0–0	1–1	0–1
Bilisht Sport	0–1	0–21	—	0–10	0–17	0–0	0–13	1–5	0–9	0–8	0–11	0–11
Juban Danja	7–0	2–3	8–0	—	3–0	5–0	2–1	4–0	3–1	0–0	4–4	2–7
FC Kinostudio	12–0	0–7	19–0	3–2	—	8–0	6–2	9–0	10–3	2–7	1–3	2–9
Lushnja	0–1	0–6	2–0	1–7	0–5	—	1–6	1–4	0–5	0–11	0–5	0–9
Partizani	4–0	3–5	5–0	2–1	3–2	13–0	—	2–0	6–0	1–4	0–4	0–5
Skënderbeu	5–0	0–3	7–0	1–6	2–8	10–1	2–6	—	1–4	0–7	1–5	0–6
Teuta	3–0	0–9	6–0	2–6	1–5	7–0	2–8	1–2	—	2–6	1–8	1–9
Tirana	14–0	2–2	13–0	5–3	6–1	11–0	1–1	10–0	15–0	—	5–0	0–4
Tirana AS	10–0	0–2	23–0	0–2	4–2	10–1	5–2	6–1	5–2	2–2	—	1–5
Vllaznia	16–0	2–0	11–0	3–0	9–1	8–0	11–0	3–0	8–0	4–0	10–0	—

Updated to match(es) played on 23 May 2021. Source:
Legend: Blue = home team win; Yellow = draw; Red = away team win.
For upcoming matches, an "a" indicates there is an article about the rivalry between the two participants.
