= 1931–32 Madrid FC season =

30th season in existence of Real Madrid CF

Madrid FC
1931–32 season
- President: Luis Usera Bugallal
- Manager: Lippo Hertzka
- La Liga: 1st
- Campeonato Mancomunado Centro-Aragón (Note: The Campeonato Mancomunado Centro-Aragón (Central-Aragon Joint Championship) was a regional league used as a qualifier for the Copa del Rey.): 1st
- Copa del Rey: Round of 16
- Biggest win: Real Madrid 9–0 Castilla FC
- Biggest defeat: C.D. Nacional 2–0 Madrid FC; Deportivo de La Coruña 2–0 Madrid FC
Home colours	Away colours

The 1931–32 season was Madrid Football Club's 30th season in existence, and their 4th consecutive season in the Primera División. The club also played in the Campeonato Mancomunado Centro-Aragón (Central-Aragon Joint Championship) and the Copa del Rey. The establishment of the Second Spanish Republic in April 1931 caused Real Madrid Club de Fútbol to lose the title "Real" and the royal crown from their crest and badge, and Real Madrid went back to being named Madrid Football Club.

Madrid FC secured their first Primera División title, finishing the league unbeaten.

== Friendlies ==
15 August 1931 Friendly	CD Leganés	3–8	Madrid FC	Leganés
		Report		Stadium: Campo de Tiro

23 August 1931 Friendly	Selección Budapest (Hungary)	2–0	(Spain) Madrid FC	Budapest, Hungary
		Report		Stadium: Hungária Körúti
Note: Selección Budapest was a team made up of players from Ferencvárosi TC, Újpest FC, and Hungária FC (now MTK Budapest FC).

26 August 1931 Friendly	Selección Praga (Czechoslovakia)	1–1	(Spain) Madrid FC	Prague, Czechoslovakia
		Report		Stadium: Stadion Letná
Note: Selección Praga was a team made up of players from SK Slavia Prague and AC Sparta Prague.

29 August 1931 Friendly	Tennis Borussia Berlin (Germany)	2–4	(Spain) Madrid FC	Berlin, Germany
		Report		Stadium: Mommsenstadion

30 August 1931 Friendly	Combinado Leipzig (Germany)	3–2	(Spain) Madrid FC	Leipzig, Germany
		Report		Stadium: Bruno-Plache-Stadion
Note: Combinado Leipzig was a team made up of players from VfB Leipzig and SC Wacker.

2 September 1931 Friendly	Combinado Yugoslavo (Kingdom of Yugoslavia)	2–1	(Spain) Madrid FC	Zagreb, Yugoslavia
		Report		Stadium: Stadion Concordije

6 September 1931 Friendly	AS Ambrosiana (Italy)	2–3	(Spain) Madrid FC	Milan, Italy
		Report		Stadium: Arena Civica

7 October 1931 Friendly	Madrid FC	7–1	Deportivo Alavés	Madrid
		Report		Stadium: Estadio Chamartín

22 November 1931 Friendly - Reserve	CD Peña Mariano	1–3	Madrid FC	Madrid
Morning		Report		Stadium: El Parral
Note: Madrid FC fielded their reserve team for this match.

8 December 1931 Friendly	Madrid FC	2–2	CD Español	Madrid
		Report		Stadium: Estadio Chamartín

6 January 1932 Friendly	Madrid FC	3–2	Sevilla FC	Madrid
		Report		Stadium: Estadio Chamartín

11 February 1932 Friendly	C.D. Nacional	2–1	Madrid FC	Madrid
		Report		Stadium: El Parral

7 March 1932 Friendly	Madrid FC	4–1	Combinado Universitario	Madrid
		Report		Stadium: Estadio Chamartín

17 April 1932 Friendly	Madrid FC	1–1	Athletic Bilbao	Madrid
		Report		Stadium: Estadio Chamartín

24 April 1932 Friendly	Madrid FC	5–2	Athletic Madrid	Madrid
		Report		Stadium: Estadio Chamartín
Note: Madrid FC were without their Spanish international players who were playing a match against Yugoslavia.

22 May 1932 Friendly	Madrid FC	3–1	Racing de Santander	Madrid
		Report		Stadium: Estadio Chamartín

26 May 1932 Friendly	Castilla FC	1–0	Madrid FC	Madrid
		Report		Stadium: Torrijos

29 May 1932 Friendly	Betis Balompié	1–1	Madrid FC	Sevilla
		Report		Stadium: El Patronato

5 June 1932 Friendly	Madrid FC	2–0	Deportivo de La Coruña	Madrid
		Report		Stadium: Estadio Chamartín

12 June 1932 Friendly	Oviedo FC	2–1	Madrid FC	Oviedo
		Report		Stadium: Buenavista

26 June 1932 Friendly - Reserve	Toledo FC	2–2	Madrid FC	Toledo
		Report		Stadium: Palomarejos
Note: Madrid FC fielded their reserve team for this match.

== Competitions ==
=== Overview ===
Competition	First match	Last match	Starting round	Final position	Record							
Competition	First match	Last match	Starting round	Final position	Pld	W	D	L	GF	GA	GD	Win %
La Liga	22 November 1931	3 April 1932	Matchday 1	Winners	18	10	8	0	37	15	+22	55.56
Campeonato Mancomunado Centro-Aragón	27 September 1931	13 December 1931	Matchday 1	Winners	10	8	1	1	40	8	+32	80.00
Copa del Rey	8 May 1932	15 May 1932	Round of 16	Round of 16	2	1	0	1	2	3	−1	50.00
Total					30	19	9	2	79	26	+53	63.33

Source: Competitions

=== La Liga ===
==== League table ====
Pos	Team	Pld	W	D	L	GF	GA	GD	Pts
1	Madrid FC (C)	18	10	8	0	37	15	+22	28
2	Athletic Bilbao	18	11	3	4	47	23	+24	25
3	FC Barcelona	18	10	4	4	40	26	+14	24
4	Racing Santander	18	7	6	5	36	35	+1	20
5	Arenas	18	7	3	8	35	42	−7	17

Rules for classification: 1) points; 2) head-to-head points; 3) head-to-head goal difference; 4) goal difference; 5) number of goals scored.
(C) Champions

==== Matches ====
22 November 1931 1	Madrid FC	1–1	Athletic Bilbao	Madrid
		Report		Stadium: Estadio Chamartín

29 November 1931 2	Donostia CF	1–2	Madrid FC	San Sebastián
		Report		Stadium: Atotxa Stadium

20 December 1931 3	Valencia CF	1–1	Madrid FC	Valencia
		Report		Stadium: Mestalla

27 December 1931 4	Madrid FC	5–0	Deportivo Alavés	Madrid
		Report		Stadium: Estadio Chamartín

3 January 1932 5	Arenas Club de Getxo	2–2	Madrid FC	Getxo
		Report		Stadium: Eliondo

10 January 1932 6	Madrid FC	3–0	RCD Español	Madrid
		Report		Stadium: Estadio Chamartín

17 January 1932 7	Madrid FC	3–2	Real Unión	Madrid
		Report		Stadium: Estadio Chamartín

24 January 1932 8	Racing de Santander	0–0	Madrid FC	Santander
		Report		Stadium: Sardinero

31 January 1932 9	Madrid FC	2–0	FC Barcelona	Madrid
		Report		Stadium: Estadio Chamartín

7 February 1932 10	Athletic Bilbao	3–3	Madrid FC	Bilbao
		Report		Stadium: San Mamés Stadium

14 February 1932 11	Madrid FC	1–0	Donostia CF	Madrid
		Report		Stadium: Estadio Chamartín

21 February 1932 12	Madrid FC	4–1	Valencia CF	Madrid
		Report		Stadium: Estadio Chamartín

28 February 1932 13	Deportivo Alavés	0–1	Madrid FC	Vitoria-Gasteiz
		Report		Stadium: Mendizorroza

6 March 1932 14	Madrid FC	4–0	Arenas Club de Getxo	Madrid
		Report		Stadium: Estadio Chamartín

13 March 1932 15	RCD Español	1–2	Madrid FC	Barcelona
		Report		Stadium: Sarriá

13 March 1932 16	Real Unión	1–1	Madrid FC	Barcelona
		Report		Stadium: Sarriá

27 March 1932 17	Madrid FC	0–0	Racing de Santander	Madrid
		Report		Stadium: Estadio Chamartín

3 April 1932 18	FC Barcelona	2–2	Madrid FC	Barcelona
		Report		Stadium: Camp de Les Corts

=== Campeonato Mancomunado Centro-Aragón ===
==== Matches ====
27 September 1931 1	Iberia SC	0–6	Madrid FC	Zaragoza
		Report		Stadium: Torrero

4 October 1931 2	Castilla FC	0–2	Madrid FC	Madrid
		Report		Stadium: Vallecas

12 October 1931 3	Madrid FC	3–1	Athletic Madrid	Madrid
		Report		Stadium: Estadio Chamartín

18 October 1931 4	Valladolid FC	0–6	Madrid FC	Valladolid
		Report		Stadium: Pl. Toros

25 October 1931 5	Madrid FC	3–1	C.D. Nacional	Madrid
		Report		Stadium: Estadio Chamartín

1 November 1931 6	Madrid FC	9–0	Castilla FC	Madrid
		Report		Stadium: Estadio Chamartín

8 November 1931 7	Madrid FC	6–0	Valladolid FC	Madrid
		Report		Stadium: Estadio Chamartín

15 November 1931 8	Athletic Madrid	3–3	Madrid FC	Madrid
		Report		Stadium: Vallecas

6 December 1931 9	Madrid FC	2–1	Iberia SC	Madrid
		Report		Stadium: Estadio Chamartín

13 December 1931 10	C.D. Nacional	2–0	Madrid FC	Madrid
		Report		Stadium: Estadio Chamartín

=== Copa del Rey ===
==== Round of 16 ====
8 May 1932 First leg	Deportivo de La Coruña	2–0	Madrid FC	A Coruña
	Cacho 17'; León 62'	Report		Stadium: Estadio Riazor; Referee: Ledesma

15 May 1932 Second leg	Madrid FC	2–1 (2–3 agg.)	Deportivo de La Coruña	Madrid
	Quincoces 63'; Hilario 87' (pen.)	Report	Chacho 83'	Stadium: Estadio Chamartín; Referee: Hdez. Areces
