= Johnica Collins =

American Samoan footballer

Personal information
- Full name: Johnica Collins
- Date of birth: 12 January 2006 (age 20)
- Place of birth: American Samoa
- Position: Forward

Team information
- Current team: Pago Youth
- Number: 11

Senior career*
Years	Team	Apps	(Gls)
2022–	Pago Youth	35	(91)
2025	→ Royal Puma (loan)	0	(0)

International career^{‡}
2022	American Samoa U20	3	(0)
2023	American Samoa U17	2	(0)
2026–	American Samoa	2	(0)
- * Club domestic league appearances and goals as of 1 February 2026 ‡ National team caps and goals as of 29 March 2026

Johnica Collins (born 12 January 2006) is an American Samoan international footballer who plays as a forward for FFAS Senior League club Pago Youth and the American Samoa national team. He was the global top scorer in the 2024 calendar year.

== Club career ==
Collins started his career with Pago Youth, playing in the 2022 FFAS Senior League, where he scored 13 goals in 14 matches. He then would be recorded playing for Pago Youth in 2023, playing 2 and scoring 1, and in 2024 playing 19 and scoring 76, the record for most goals in a season in the FFAS Senior League. On 2 September 2024, he scored ten goals during the 24–1 victory against Utulei Youth while playing as a substitute.

He has also played in the 2025 and 2026 OFC Men's Champions League qualifying stage, playing for Royal Puma and Pago Youth respectively, scoring 2 in 2 in 2025, and scoring 2 in 3 in 2026.

== International career ==
Collins made his debut for American Samoa on 25 March 2026 during the 5–2 loss against the United States Virgin Islands during the 2026 FIFA Series: Puerto Rico.

== Personal life ==
His brothers Joseph and Poasa also play for Pago Youth.

== Career statistics ==
=== Club ===
Club	Season	League			Other		Total	
Club	Season	Division	Apps	Goals	Apps	Goals	Apps	Goals
Pago Youth	2022	FFAS Senior League	14	13	—		14	13
Pago Youth	2023	FFAS Senior League	2	1	—		2	1
Pago Youth	2024	FFAS Senior League	19	76	—		19	76
Pago Youth	2026	FFAS Senior League	0	0	3 (Note: Appearances in OFC Champions League)	2	3	2
Pago Youth	Total	FFAS Senior League	35	90	3	2	38	92
Royal Puma (loan)	2025	FFAS Senior League	—		2	2	2	2
Career total			35	90	5	4	40	94

=== International ===
As of match played 28 March 2026

Appearances and goals by national team and year
National team	Year	Apps	Goals
American Samoa	2026	2	0
Total		2	0

== Personal life ==
Johnica was the American Samoan flagbearer in the 2018 FIFA World Cup.
