= FFAS President's Cup =

The FFAS President's Cup is American Samoa's premier knockout tournament in men's football (soccer).

== Previous winners ==
- 2010: Vailoatai Youth 3–2 (a.e.t.) Lion Heart
- 2011: Not held
- 2012: Taputimu Youth 1–0 Lion Heart
- 2013: FC SKBC 3–2 Taputimu Youth
- 2014: Utulei Youth 2–1 Lion Heart

== See also ==
- FFAS Senior League
- Football Federation American Samoa
