= 2013 First Division (Guinea-Bissau) =

First Division
- Season: 2013
- Champions: CF Os Balantas
- Runner up: Mavegro
- Promoted: UDI Bissau; Académica de Ingoré
- Relegated: AC Bissorã; Académica Ingoré
- Matches: 90
- Goals: 170 (1.89 per match)

The 2013 First Division season was the 34th of the amateur competition of the first-tier football in Guinea-Bissau. The tournament was organized by the Football Federation of Guinea-Bissau. The season began on 12 January and finished on 16 June. Balantas won their fourth and recent title and finished with 40 points and later competed in the 2004 CAF Champions League the following season. Estrela de Cantanhez (Third Division participant) won the 2013 Guinea-Bissau Cup and later competed in the 2014 CAF Confederation Cup the following season.

There was no competition last season due to financial concerns.

It was an 18 match season and had a total of 90 matches. A total of 170 goals were scored.

AC Bissorã was the defending team of the title. Benfica Bissau scored the most goals and numbered 23, Balantas and Sporting Bafatá were second with 23 goals and Bissorã scored the least with 10. On the opposites, Os Balantas conceded the least with 8 and Académica Ingoré conceded the most with 26.

== Participating clubs ==
- Sporting Clube de Bafatá
- Sporting Clube de Bissau
- Sport Portos de Bissau
- Sport Bissau e Benfica
- Atlético Clube de Bissorã
- Cuntum FC
- UDI Bissau - Promoted from the Second Division
- Mavegro Futebol Clube
- Académica de Ingoré - Promoted from the Second Division
- CF Os Balantas

== Overview ==
The league was contested by 10 teams with Os Balantas winning the championship.

== League standings ==
Pos	Team	Pld	W	D	L	GF	GA	GD	Pts
1	CF Os Balantas	18	12	4	2	23	8	+15	40
2	Sporting Clube de Bissau	18	10	4	4	22	10	+12	34
3	Benfica Bissau	18	9	5	4	25	14	+11	32
4	Sporting Bafatá	18	9	3	6	23	16	+7	30
5	Cuntum Futebol Clube	18	4	12	2	16	16	0	24
6	UDI Bissau	18	6	5	7	13	17	-4	23
7	Mavegro FC	18	5	5	8	14	19	-5	20
8	Sport Portos de Bissau	18	4	6	8	13	23	-10	18
9	Atlético Clube de Bissorã	18	3	5	10	10	21	-17	14
10	Académica de Ingoré	18	2	3	13	11	26	-15	9

National Champion
Relegation to the Second Division

First Division 2013
Champions
CF Os Balantas
4th title

== See also ==
- Campeonato Nacional da Guiné-Bissau
