= 2004–05 First Division (Guinea-Bissau) =

First Division
- Season: 2004–05
- Champions: Sporting Bissau
- Runner up: Atlético Clube de Bissorã
- Promoted: Sport Portos de Bissau; Desportivo de Gabú; Desportivo de Nhacra
- Relegated: Bula Futebol Clube; Sporting Clube de Bafatá; Desportivo de Nhacra
- Matches: 162
- Goals: 307 (1.9 per match)
- Top goalscorer: (Guinea-Bissau) João Carlos Madjer (14)

The 2004–05 First Division season was the 27th of the amateur competition of the first-tier football in Guinea-Bissau. The tournament was organized by the Football Federation of Guinea-Bissau. The season began on 27 November 2004 and finished on 21 May 2005, this was their next in two years. SC de Bissau won their twelfth title and finished with 42 points and to financial reasons did not qualify and competed in the 2006 CAF Champions League the following season. As SC Bissau won the 2005 Guinea-Bissau Cup, the second placed club did not participate in the 2006 CAF Confederation Cup the following season also to financial concerns.

Originally a 22 match season and would be 232, three later matches were cancelled and reduced its number to 228.

SC de Bissau was the defending team of the title. SC Bissau finished with 45 points and also scored the most goals and numbered 40. 5

== Participating clubs ==
- Sporting Clube de Bissau
- Bula Futebol Clube
- Sport Portos de Bissau - Promoted from the Second Division
- Sport Bissau e Benfica
- Atlético Clube de Bissorã
- Desportivo de Nhacra - Promoted from the Second Division
- Sporting Clube de Bafatá
- Futebol Clube de Cantchungo
- Mavegro Futebol Clube
- Desportivo de Gabú - Promoted from the Second Division
- Estrela Negra de Bolama - Promu de Segunda Divisião
- CF Os Balantas

== Overview ==
The league was contested by 12 teams with SC de Bissau winning the championship.

== League standings ==
Pos	Team	Pld	W	D	L	GF	GA	GD	Pts
1	Sporting Clube de Bissau	22	13	6	3	40	18	+22	45
2	Atlético Clube de Bissorã	21	10	8	3	27	16	+11	38
3	Mavegro Futebol Clube	22	10	7	5	34	16	+18	37
4	CF Os Balantas	21	10	6	5	27	16	+11	36
5	Sport Bissau e Benfica	22	8	9	5	26	13	+13	33
6	Sport Portos de Bissau	21	9	6	6	24	17	+7	33
7	Desportivo de Gabú	22	5	10	7	23	27	-4	25
8	Estrela Negra de Bolama	21	7	3	11	35	37	-2	24
9	Futebol Clube de Cantchungo	22	6	6	10	16	33	-17	24
10	Bula Futebol Clube	22	6	3	13	22	48	-26	21
9	Sporting Clube de Bafatá	21	6	2	13	20	35	-15	20
10	Desportivo de Nhacra	21	3	6	12	13	31	-18	15

National Champion
Relegation to the Second Division

First Division 2004-05
Champions
SC de Bissau
12th title

== See also ==
- Campeonato Nacional da Guiné-Bissau
