= 2021 FFAS Senior League =

Season of the FFAS Senior League

FFAS Senior League
- Season: 2021
- Dates: 21 August – 11 December 2021
- Matches: 85
- Goals: 515 (6.06 per match)

The 2021 FFAS Senior League was the 40th season of the FFAS Senior League, the top American Samoan professional league for association football clubs since its establishment in 1976. Pago Youth are the defending champions. The start date for the season was 21 August 2021.

== Teams ==
Ten teams competed in the league – the one disappearance from the previous season being Taputimu Youth.

- Black Roses
- Green Bay
- Ilaoa and To'omata
- Lion Heart
- Pago Youth
- PanSa
- Royal Puma
- Tafuna Jets
- Utulei Youth
- Vaiala Tongan

== League table ==
Pos	Team	Pld	W	D	L	GF	GA	GD	Pts
1	Vaiala Tongan (C)	18	14	3	1	85	14	+71	45
2	Pago Youth	18	13	3	2	94	24	+70	42
3	Royal Puma	18	10	7	1	59	22	+37	37
4	Ilaoa and To'omata	18	11	2	5	79	38	+41	35
5	Utulei Youth	18	10	3	5	68	39	+29	33
6	PanSa	18	6	4	8	38	40	−2	22
7	Lion Heart	18	6	3	9	34	53	−19	21
8	Green Bay	18	3	1	14	46	113	−67	10
9	Tafuna Jets	18	2	1	15	16	112	−96	7
10	Black Roses	18	1	1	16	18	82	−64	4

Updated to match(es) played on unknown. Source: RSSSF
Rules for classification: 1) Points; 2) Goal difference; 3) Goals scored
(C) Champions

== Results ==
Home \ Away	BLA	GRE	ILA	LIO	PAG	PAN	ROY	TAF	UTU	VAI
Black Roses	—	5–2	1–4	0–3	1–3	1–5		0–3	0–5	
Green Bay	6–3	—			1–15		1–7	3–2	2–8	3–8
Ilaoa and To'omata			—	4–2	2–1	3–4	2–0	4–2	1–6	1–1
Lion Heart	3–3	1–1	3–1	—		4–0		5–0	2–10	0–2
Pago Youth		13–2		4–0	—	2–1	2–2	6–0		2–1
PanSa	22–0	7–3	2–6		1–2	—	1–1		2–2	1–3
Royal Puma	4–2	7–1	2–0	2–2	2–2	6–1	—	3–0	1–1	2–2
Tafuna Jets		2–12			0–5	2–2	1–9	—	1–5	0–17
Utulei Youth	3–1	7–2	2–8	3–2	1–1	2–1		6–0	—	
Vaiala Tongan	4–1		4–1	10–0	6–1	2–0		12–0	3–1	—

Updated to match(es) played on 3 December 2021. Source: RSSSF
Legend: Blue = home team win; Yellow = draw; Red = away team win.

== Season statistics ==
=== Top scorers ===
Rank	Player	Club	Goals
1	(American Samoa) Petu Pouli	Vaiala Tongan	30
2	(American Samoa) Puni Samuelu	Pago Youth FC	21
3	(American Samoa) Joe Koroiadi	Ilaoa and To'omata	20
4	(American Samoa) Nofomuli Uitala	Vaiala Tongan	19
5	(American Samoa) Tino Vaifale	Ilaoa and To'omata	18
