= 2006 First Division (Guinea-Bissau) =

First Division
- Season: 2005–06
- Champions: CF Os Balantas
- Runner up: Mavegro
- Promoted: ADR Mansaba; Flamengo Futebol Clube; Farim
- Relegated: Portos de Bissau; Benfica Bissau; DRC Farim
- Matches: 132
- Goals: 280 (2.12 per match)

The 2006 First Division season was the 27th season for the amateur competition, of the first-tier football in Guinea-Bissau. The tournament was organized by the Football Federation of Guinea-Bissau, with the season beginning on 14 January and ending on 14 July. Balantas won their twelfth title and finished with 50 points and for financial reasons did not qualify and competed in the 2007 CAF Champions League the following season. Portos de Bissau won the 2006 Guinea-Bissau Cup, instead, the cup finalist Benfica Bissau participated in the 2007 CAF Confederation Cup the following season.

It was a 22 match season and had a total of 132 matches.

SC de Bissau was again the defending team of the title. Balantas finished with 50 points and the only club who never lost a match in the season, Mavegro scored the most goals and numbered 37.

== Participating clubs ==
- Sporting Clube de Bissau
- Flamengo Futebol Clube - Promoted from the Second Division
- Sport Portos de Bissau
- Sport Bissau e Benfica
- Atlético Clube de Bissorã
- ADR Mansaba - Promoted from the Second Division
- DRC Farim - Promoted from the Second Division
- Futebol Clube de Cantchungo
- Mavegro Futebol Clube
- Desportivo de Gabú
- Estrela Negra de Bolama
- CF Os Balantas

== Overview ==
The league was contested by 12 teams with Os Balantas winning the championship.

== League standings ==
Pos	Team	Pld	W	D	L	GF	GA	GD	Pts
1	CF Os Balantas	22	14	8	0	31	11	+20	50
2	Mavegro Futebol Clube	22	12	9	1	37	21	+16	45
3	ADR Mansaba	22	8	9	5	22	16	+6	33
4	Sporting Clube de Bissau	21	9	4	9	22	27	-5	31
5	Desportivo de Gabú	22	7	6	9	21	29	-8	27
6	Estrela Negra de Bolama	22	7	5	10	33	33	0	26
7	Flamengo Futebol Clube	22	6	7	9	13	20	-7	25
8	Futebol Clube de Cantchungo	22	5	10	7	24	21	+3	25
9	Atlético Clube de Bissorã	22	6	6	10	16	33	-17	24
10	Sport Portos de Bissau	22	4	1	7	16	18	-2	23
11	Sport Bissau e Benfica	22	5	7	10	25	30	-5	22
12	DRC Farim	22	5	5	12	14	25	-11	20

National Champion
Relegation to the Second Division

First Division 2006
Champions
CF Os Balantas
2nd title

== See also ==
- Campeonato Nacional da Guiné-Bissau
