= Quinara FC =

Quinara
- Full name: Quinara FC
- Ground: Stadio Fulakunda; Fulakunda, Guinea-Bissau
- Capacity: 5,000
- League: Campeonato Assotiation da Guine-Bissau

Quinara is a Guinea-Bissauan football club based in Fulakunda. They play in the league amateur Guinean football, the Campeonato Nacional da Guine-Bissau. In 2026, the club plays in Segunda League.

== Current squad ==
Note: Flags indicate national team as defined under FIFA eligibility rules; some limited exceptions apply. Players may hold more than one non-FIFA nationality.

| No. | Pos. | Nation | Player |
|---|---|---|---|
| 1 | GK | GNB | Augusto Dos Santos |
| 2 | GK | GNB | Hamadou Mossi-Garba |
| 3 | DF | GNB | Kumba Fadeira |
| 4 | DF | GNB | Nzitabankuzу Robert |
| 5 | DF | GNB | Fidelis Cabral Kristiano |
| 6 | DF | GNB | Lukas Pereira Torrado |
| 7 | DF | GNB | Alkides Dutra |
| 8 | DF | GNB | Hyginu Courvou |
| 9 | MF | GNB | Manuel Maria Coeliu |
| 10 | MF | GNB | Jose Antoniu Ferreira |
| 11 | MF | GNB | Madolen Blemu |

| No. | Pos. | Nation | Player |
|---|---|---|---|
| 12 | MF | GNB | Gabriel N'Tchama |
| 13 | MF | GNB | Agostiniou Coeliu |
| 14 | MF | GNB | Carlush Ivu |
| 15 | MF | GNB | Joau Augustu de Oliveira Muzanti |
| 16 | MF | GNB | Enrique Cobra |
| 17 | MF | GNB | Manuel de Almeida |
| 18 | FW | GNB | Braima Calacho |
| 19 | FW | GNB | Bernardo Cristiano |
| 20 | FW | GNB | Cristian Benante |
| 21 | FW | GNB | Nelson Lamin |
| 22 | FW | GNB | Eusebyu Kastelu du Valie |
