= KFF Elbasani =

Albanian football club

- Full name: Klubi i Futbollit për Femra Elbasani
- Founded: 30 October 2013; 12 years ago
- Dissolved: 2015
- Ground: Elbasan Arena
- Capacity: 12,800
- Manager: Blendi Hoxholli
- League: Women's National Championship
- 2014–15: Women's National Championship, 8th

KFF Elbasani were an Albanian women's football club based in Elbasan. They last competed in Kategoria Superiore Femra during the 2014–15 season, finishing eighth in a twelve-team league.

== History ==
KFF Elbasani was founded on 30 October 2013, although women's football had been present in this region for years prior. The team held its first practice session the following day and played their only international match against Vizioni Ferizaj, which ended in a 1–2 loss. Two months later, Elbasani hosted a three-team tournament, matched up against Skënderbeu and Apolonia, winning 2–0 and 1–0, respectively.
