= 1897–98 Celtic F.C. season =

Celtic
1897–98 season
- Manager: Willie Maley
- Stadium: Celtic Park
- Scottish Division One: 1st
- Scottish Cup: Second round

1897–98 was Celtic's tenth season of competitive football. They competed in Scottish Division One, which they won for the fourth time. It was the fifth major domestic honour in the club's history. Dan Doyle, who had been playing for the club since 1891, became its second ever captain this season as James Kelly had retired.

== Competitions ==
=== Scottish Division One ===
==== League table ====
Pos	Team	Pld	W	D	L	GF	GA	GD	Pts	Qualification or relegation
1	Celtic (C)	18	15	3	0	56	13	+43	33	Champions
2	Rangers	18	13	3	2	71	15	+56	29	
3	Hibernian	18	10	2	6	47	29	+18	22	
4	Heart of Midlothian	18	8	4	6	54	33	+21	20	
5	St Mirren	18	8	2	8	30	36	−6	18	

Source: statto.com
Rules for classification: Teams finish equal if level on points. Points system: 2 points for a win, 1 point for a draw, 0 points for a loss
(C) Champions

==== Matches ====
4 September 1897 1	Celtic	4–1	Hibernian	Glasgow
				Stadium: Celtic Park; Attendance: 17,000

11 September 1897 2	Hearts	0–0	Celtic	Edinburgh
				Stadium: Tynecastle Park; Attendance: 14,000

20 September 1897 3	St Bernard's	0–2	Celtic	Edinburgh
				Stadium: New Logie Green; Attendance: 3,000

25 September 1897 4	Celtic	6–1	Clyde	Glasgow
				Stadium: Celtic Park; Attendance: 5,000

27 September 1897 5	Rangers	0–4	Celtic	Govan
				Stadium: Ibrox Park; Attendance: 31,000

2 October 1897 6	St Mirren	0–0	Celtic	Paisley
				Stadium: St Mirren Park, Love Street; Attendance: 12,000

9 October 1897 7	Third Lanark	0–1	Celtic	Glasgow
				Stadium: Cathkin Park; Attendance: 12,000

23 October 1897 8	Celtic	3–2	Hearts	Glasgow
				Stadium: Celtic Park; Attendance: 17,000

6 November 1897 9	Dundee	1–2	Celtic	Dundee
				Stadium: Carolina Port; Attendance: 11,000

27 November 1897 10	Hibernian	1–2	Celtic	Leith
				Stadium: Easter Road; Attendance: 12,000

4 December 1897 11	Celtic	4–0	Third Lanark	Glasgow
				Stadium: Celtic Park; Attendance: 6,000

11 December 1897 12	Partick Thistle	3–6	Celtic	Partick
				Stadium: Meadowside; Attendance: 8,000

18 December 1897 13	Celtic	5–1	St Bernard's	Glasgow
				Stadium: Celtic Park; Attendance: 8,000

25 December 1897 14	Clyde	1–9	Celtic	Glasgow
				Stadium: Barrowfield Park; Attendance: 3,000

15 January 1898 15	Celtic	2–1	Dundee	Glasgow
				Stadium: Celtic Park; Attendance: 7,000

29 January 1898 16	Celtic	3–1	Partick Thistle	Glasgow
				Stadium: Celtic Park; Attendance: 4,500

12 February 1898 17	Celtic	3–0	St Mirren	Glasgow
				Stadium: Celtic Park; Attendance: 3,000

11 April 1898 18 (Note: Replayed after original fixture on 1 January was abandoned due to repeated crowd encroachment.)	Celtic	0–0	Rangers	Glasgow
				Stadium: Celtic Park; Attendance: 16,000

=== Scottish Cup ===
8 January 1898 First round	Arthurlie	0–7	Celtic	Arthurlie
				Stadium: Dunterlie Park

22 January 1898 Second round	Third Lanark	3–2	Celtic	Glasgow
				Stadium: Cathkin Park; Attendance: 13,000

=== Friendly ===
12 March 1898 (Note: Reported in some sources as being an unofficial British/World Championship – Sheffield United had just won the 1897–98 Football League title.) 1st leg	Sheffield United	1–0	Celtic	Sheffield
	Gaudie	Report		Stadium: Bramall Lane; Attendance: 7,000

16 April 1898 2nd leg	Celtic	1–1	Sheffield United	Glasgow
	McMahon 30'	Report	Almond 87'	Stadium: Celtic Park; Attendance: 12,000; Referee: W. McLeod

== See also ==
- List of unbeaten football club seasons
