= 2021–22 Kategoria Superiore Femra =

Kategoria Superiore Femra
- Season: 2021–22
- Dates: 2 October 2021 – 19 May 2022
- Champions: Vllaznia
- Champions League: Vllaznia
- Matches: 110
- Goals: 712 (6.47 per match)
- Top goalscorer: Megi Doçi (66)
- Biggest home win: Apolonia 20–0 Skënderbeu (26 February 2022)
- Biggest away win: Teuta 1–18 Vllaznia (11 December 2021)
- Highest scoring: Apolonia 20–0 Skënderbeu (26 February 2022)
- Longest winning run: 16 matches Vllaznia
- Longest unbeaten run: 20 matches Vllaznia
- Longest winless run: 19 matches Lushnja
- Longest losing run: 19 matches Lushnja

The 2021–22 Kategoria Superiore Femra was the 13th season of women's professional football, organized by the Albanian Football Federation.

Locations of teams from the 2021–22 season

== League table ==
Pos	Team	Pld	W	D	L	GF	GA	GD	Pts
1	Vllaznia (Note: Vllaznia qualified to the UEFA Champions League first round.) (C)	20	19	1	0	162	2	+160	58
2	Apolonia	20	16	2	2	156	13	+143	50
3	Tirana (Note: Tirana was deducted 3 points after failing to show up in an away match against Vllaznia.)	20	15	1	4	84	28	+56	43
4	Partizani	20	14	0	6	68	34	+34	42
5	Murlani	20	13	1	6	81	48	+33	40
6	Kinostudio	20	8	2	10	41	80	−39	26
7	Atletik Klub	20	7	2	11	39	68	−29	23
8	Teuta	20	6	0	14	38	102	−64	18
9	Skënderbeu	20	3	2	15	16	110	−94	11
10	Tirana AS	20	2	1	17	18	109	−91	7
11	Lushnja	20	1	0	19	9	118	−109	3

Updated to match(es) played on 19 May 2022. Source: FSHF
(C) Champions

== Results ==
Home \ Away	APF	ATL	KIN	LUS	MUR	PAR	SKË	TEU	TIR	TAS	VLL
Apolonia	—	8–0	12–0	17–0	10–2	5–1	20–0	8–0	4–2	8–0	1–1
Atletik Club	0–8	—	1–1	4–0	1–2	0–2	1–1	4–3	0–1	6–2	0–8
FC Kinostudio	0–7	3–1	—	4–0	1–8	2–4	2–0	4–2	0–8	1–0	0–9
Lushnja	0–7	2–5	0–7	—	1–6	0–5	0–2	3–2	0–7	1–3	0–14
Murlani	3–0	7–1	3–3	8–0	—	1–3	4–0	5–0	3–1	7–0	0–6
Partizani	0–2	5–0	3–0	7–0	1–0	—	6–1	4–1	2–3	5–0	0–5
Skënderbeu	0–12	1–6	2–5	3–1	1–4	1–6	—	1–4	0–5	1–0	0–14
Teuta	0–13	2–3	4–3	3–0	1–9	3–5	3–1	—	0–6	6–3	1–18
Tirana	0–0	6–1	6–1	6–0	4–2	2–1	10–0	6–1	—	6–1	0–8
Tirana AS	0–14	2–5	0–4	4–1	0–7	0–8	1–1	1–2	1–5	—	0–12
Vllaznia	4–0	4–0	10–0	4–0	14–0	8–0	6–0	5–0	3–0	9–0	—

Updated to match(es) played on 19 May 2022. Source:
Legend: Blue = home team win; Yellow = draw; Red = away team win.
For upcoming matches, an "a" indicates there is an article about the rivalry between the two participants.
