= 2017–18 Kitchee SC season =

Kitchee 2017–18 Season
- President: Ken K. Ng
- Manager: (Hong Kong) Chu Chi Kwong
- Stadium: Mong Kok Stadium
- Premier League: 1st
- Senior Shield: Semi-finals
- FA Cup: Winners
- Sapling Cup: Winners
- Community Cup: Winners
- AFC Champions League: Group Stage
Home colours	Away colours

The 2017–18 season is Kitchee's 39th season in the top-tier division in Hong Kong football. Kitchee will compete in the Premier League, Senior Challenge Shield, FA Cup, Sapling Cup and AFC Champions League in this season.

By joining the AFC Champions League, this has become the first time for Kitchee to appear in the group stage of it. On 14 March 2018, Kitchee managed to achieve a 1–0 win over Kashiwa Reysol, becoming the first-ever team from Hong Kong to win a game in the history of the AFC Champions League group stage.

== Players ==
=== First Team Current Squad List (As of 20 May 2018) ===
First Team Current Squad List
Number	Nationality	Full Name	Position
1	(China)	Wang Zhenpeng	Goalkeeper
2	(Spain)	Fernando Recio	Defender
3	(Spain)	Daniel Cancela Rodríguez	Defender
5	(Brazil)	Hélio José de Souza Gonçalves	Defender
6	(Hong Kong) (Germany)	Zhi-Gin Andreas Lam	Midfielder
7	(Brazil)	Fernando Augusto Azevedo Pedreira	Midfielder
8	(Nigeria)	Alexander Oluwatayo Akande	Forward
9	(Brazil)	Lucas Espindola da Silva	Forward
10	(Hong Kong)	Lam Ka Wai (vice-captain)	Midfielder
11	(Brazil)	Alessandro Ferreira Leonardo	Forward
12	(Hong Kong)	Lo Kwan Yee (captain)	Defender
13	(Hong Kong)	Li Ngai Hoi	Defender
14	(Spain)	Jordi Tarrés	Forward
15	(Ghana)	Annan Christian Kwesi	Forward
16	(Hong Kong) (Australia)	Jared Christopher Lum	Midfielder
17	(Brazil)	Paulo Robspierry Carreiro	Forward
18	(Uruguay)	Diego Forlán	Forward
19	(China)	Huang Yang	Midfielder
21	(Hong Kong)	Tong Kin Man	Defender
23	(China)	Guo Jianqiao	Goalkeeper
28	(Hong Kong)	Cheng Chin Lung	Midfielder
30	(Hong Kong)	Wong Tsz Ho	Goalkeeper
32	(Hungary)	Krisztián Vadócz	Midfielder
34	(Hong Kong) (Israel)	Barak Braunshtain	Midfielder
35	(Hong Kong) (Philippines)	Mark Francis Mercenes Swainston	Defender
36	(Hong Kong) (England)	Victor Alexander Stamp	Forward
38	(South Korea)	Kim Dong-Jin	Defender
67	(Hong Kong) (England)	Sebastian Robert Buddle	Forward
90	(South Korea)	Kim Bong-Jin	Defender

Remarks: Flags indicate national team as defined under FIFA eligibility rules. Players may hold more than one non-FIFA nationality.

=== Out On Loan (As of 30 June 2018) ===
Out On Loan List
Nationality	Full Name	Position	On Loan At Team Name	Start date	End date
(Hong Kong)	Chan Ka Ho	Goalkeeper	(Hong Kong) Yuen Long	15 July 2017	30 June 2018
(Hong Kong)	Li Ngai Hoi	Defender	Hong Kong Pegasus	15 July 2017	31 December 2017
(Spain)	Jordi Tarrés	Forward	(Hong Kong) Lee Man	15 July 2017	31 December 2017
(Hong Kong)	Ngan Lok Fung	Midfielder	(Hong Kong) Lee Man	15 July 2017	30 June 2018
(Republic of Ireland)	Emmet Wan	Midfielder	(Hong Kong) Lee Man	15 July 2017	30 June 2018
(Hong Kong)	Law Tsz Chun	Defender	(Hong Kong) Dreams FC	15 July 2017	30 June 2018
(Japan)	Hirokane Harima	Forward	(Hong Kong) Dreams FC	15 July 2017	30 June 2018
(Hong Kong)	Cheng Chin Lung	Forward	(Hong Kong) Dreams FC	15 July 2017	31 December 2017
(Hong Kong) (Canada)	Matthew Thomas Lam	Midfielder	(Hong Kong) Lee Man	1 January 2018	30 June 2018

=== Reserves Team Current Squad List (As of 11 January 2017) ===
Reserve Team List
Nationality	Full Name	Position
(Hong Kong)	Au Man Lok	Midfielder
(Hong Kong)	Lee Chun Lok	Defender
(Hong Kong)	Tong Hew Yeung	Defender
(Hong Kong) (Israel)	Nir Horowitz	Goalkeeper
(Hong Kong) (Israel)	Oded Perlman	Defender
(Hong Kong) (Japan)	Hyu Hugh Matsumoto	Defender
(Hong Kong) (South Korea)	Jin Won Bong	Defender

Remarks:: Flags indicate national team as defined under FIFA eligibility rules. Players may hold more than one non-FIFA nationality.

== Club officials ==
=== General Structure ===
General Structure
Kitchee Sports Club
Kitchee Foundation Limited
Kitchee (Sports Management) Limited

=== Club Senior Staff ===
Club Senior Staff
Position	Name
President	(Hong Kong) Ken K. Ng
General Manager	(Australia) Wilson Ng
Public Relations Manager	(Canada) Ng Yee Yun, Jessica
Director of Marketing	(Hong Kong) Lo Shuk Ting
Director of Football	(Hong Kong) Chu Chi Kwong, Alex
Competition Manager	(Hong Kong) Chiu Yun Shing, Lester
Customer Service Manager	(Hong Kong) Cheng Ching Yu, Macro

=== Club Coach Staff ===
Club Coach Staff
Position	Name
Head coach	(Hong Kong) Chu Chi Kwong, Alex
Assistant Coach	(Spain) Roberto Losada
Assistant Coach	(Hong Kong) Cristiano Cordeiro
Goalkeeping Coach	(Spain) Roberto Sambade Carreira
Head of Youth Developing	(Spain) Pedro Garcia Diaz
Head of Recovery & Regeneration	(Spain) Pau MP
Head of Performance	(Hong Kong) Lee Wai Yuk, Justin
Club Physiotherapist	(Hong Kong) Ngai Chi Wing, Gorman
Team Assistant	(Hong Kong) Lee Wing Po
Reserve Team Head Coach	(Spain) Pedro Garcia Diaz
Reserve Team Assistant Coach	(Hong Kong) Yu Siu Chee
Reserve Team Assistant Coach	(Hong Kong) Gao Wen
U18 Team Coach	(Hong Kong) Gao Wen
U17, U15, U14 Team Coach	(Hong Kong) Cristiano Cordeiro
U16, U11 Team Coach	(Hong Kong) Chu Chi Kwong, Alex
U13 Team Coach	(Spain) Roberto Losada
Youth Coach	(Hong Kong) Yu Siu Chee
Club Doctor	(Hong Kong) Dr. Yung Shu Hang, Patrick
Kitchee Academy director	(Spain) Roberto Losada
Kitchee Academy Coach	(Hong Kong) Gao Wen
Professional Footballer Preparatory Programme Coach	(Hong Kong) Cristiano Cordeiro

== Competitions ==
Win Draw Loss

=== Hong Kong Premier League ===
==== Table ====
Pos	Team	Pld	W	D	L	GF	GA	GD	Pts	Qualification or relegation
1	Kitchee (C)	18	16	2	0	67	12	+55	50	Qualification to 2019 AFC Champions League Preliminary Round 2 or 2019 AFC Cup Group stage
2	Tai Po	18	11	4	3	36	21	+15	37	Qualification to 2019 AFC Cup Play-off round
3	Pegasus	18	10	4	4	37	26	+11	34	

Updated to match(es) played on 13 May 2018. Source: Hong Kong Football Association
Rules for classification: 1) Points; 2) Head-to-head points; 3) Head-to-head goal difference; 4) Head-to-head goals scored; 5) Goal difference; 6) Goals scored; 7) Fair-play points; 8) Drawing lots (Play-off if the winner has to be decided)
(C) Champions

==== Results by round ====
Round	1	2	3	4	5	6	7	8	9	10	11	12	13	14	15	16	17	18
Ground	H	H	A	A	H	H	A	A	H	A	A	H	A	H	A	H	A	H
Result	W	W	D	W	W	W	W	W	D	W	W	W	W	W	W	W	W	W
Position	2	1	1	3	1	1	1	1	1	1	1	1	1	1	1	1	1	1

Updated to match(es) played on 13 May 2018. Source: Competitive Matches
A = Away; H = Home; W = Win; D = Draw; L = Loss

==== Results summary ====
Overall								Home						Away					
Pld	W	D	L	GF	GA	GD	Pts	W	D	L	GF	GA	GD	W	D	L	GF	GA	GD
18	16	2	0	67	12	+55	50	8	1	0	29	5	+24	8	1	0	38	7	+31

Last updated: 16 May 2018.
Source: Competitive Matches

==== League Matches ====
25 August 2017 1	Kitchee	1–0	Eastern Long Lions	Mong Kok, Kowloon
20:00 (UTC+8)	Vadócz 70'	Report		Stadium: Mong Kok Stadium; Attendance: 4,397; Referee: Lau Fong Hei

10 September 2017 2	Kitchee	7–0	Dreams FC	Mong Kok, Kowloon
17:30 (UTC+8)	Lucas 29', 45' (pen.), 76', 84'; Sandro 59' (pen.); Lum 78'; Lo Kwan Yee 88'	Report		Stadium: Mong Kok Stadium; Attendance: 1,244; Referee: Liu Kwok Man

17 September 2017 3	HK Pegasus	1–1	Kitchee	So Kon Po, Hong Kong Island
17:30 (UTC+8)	Travis Major 87'	Report	Fernando 90'	Stadium: Hong Kong Stadium; Attendance: 1,627; Referee: Ho Wai Sing

10 September 2017 4	Kitchee	2–1	Wo Foo Tai Po	Mong Kok, Kowloon
17:30 (UTC+8)	Vadócz 66'; Sandro 89'	Report	Dudu 22'	Stadium: Mong Kok Stadium; Attendance: 1,392; Referee: Liu Kwok Man

=== Hong Kong Senior Challenge Shield ===
21 October 2017 QF	Kitchee	5–0	BC Rangers	Tseung Kwan O, New Territories
20:00 (UTC+8)	Sandro 16'; Lam Ka Wai 25'; Fernando 28'; Lucas 35'; Alex 90+2'	Report		Stadium: Tseung Kwan O Sports Ground; Attendance: 603; Referee: Ng Chiu Kok

24 December 2017 SF	Kitchee	1–3	Sun Bus Yuen Long	Mong Kok, Kowloon
15:00 (UTC+8)	Sandro 36'; Lam (yellow card) 59'; Dani Cancela (yellow card) 90+2' (yellow-red card); Lum (yellow card) 108'; Lam Ka Wai (yellow card) 120+3'	Report	Ip Chung Long 39'; Juninho (yellow card) 88'; Everton Camargo 95' 111'; Lau Ka Ming (yellow card) 103'; Lau Ho Lam (yellow card) 105+2'; Fábio Lopes (yellow card) 109'	Stadium: Mong Kok Stadium; Attendance: 1,732

=== Hong Kong Community Cup ===
23 September 2017 1	Kitchee	2–1	Eastern Long Lions	Mong Kok, Kowloon
20:00 (UTC+8)	Alex 33'; Annan 63'	Report	Lo Kong Wai 53'	Stadium: Mong Kok Stadium; Attendance: 3,486; Referee: Tam Ping Wun

=== AFC Champions League ===
==== Group stage ====
Pos	Team	Pld	W	D	L	GF	GA	GD	Pts	Qualification	JEO	TJQ	KSW	KIT
1	(South Korea) Jeonbuk Hyundai Motors	6	5	0	1	22	9	+13	15	Advance to knockout stage	—	6–3	3–2	3–0
2	(China) Tianjin Quanjian	6	4	1	1	15	11	+4	13	Advance to knockout stage	4–2	—	3–2	3–0
3	(Japan) Kashiwa Reysol	6	1	1	4	6	10	−4	4		0–2	1–1	—	1–0
4	(Hong Kong) Kitchee	6	1	0	5	1	14	−13	3		0–6	0–1	1–0	—

Source: AFC
Rules for classification: Group stage tiebreakers

13 February 2018	Tianjin Quanjian (China)	3–0	(Hong Kong) Kitchee	Tianjin, China
20:00 UTC+8	Modeste 32'; Paulinho 36' (o.g.); Sun Ke 39'	Live Report; Stats Report		Stadium: Tianjin Olympic Center Stadium; Attendance: 21,213; Referee: Abdulrahman Al-Jassim (Qatar)

20 February 2018	Kitchee (Hong Kong)	0–6	(South Korea) Jeonbuk Hyundai Motors	Hong Kong
20:00 UTC+8		Live Report; Stats Report	Adriano 6' (pen.), 14', 45+1' (pen.); Kim Jin-su 25'; Alves 32'; Lee Dong-gook 90+3'	Stadium: Hong Kong Stadium; Attendance: 13,519; Referee: Rowan Arumughan (India)

6 March 2018	Kashiwa Reysol (Japan)	1–0	(Hong Kong) Kitchee	Kashiwa, Japan
19:30 UTC+9	Ito 66'	Live Report; Stats Report		Stadium: Kashiwa Soccer Stadium; Attendance: 5,541; Referee: Ilgiz Tantashev (Uzbekistan)

14 March 2018	Kitchee (Hong Kong)	1–0	(Japan) Kashiwa Reysol	Hong Kong
20:00 UTC+8	Cheng Chin Lung 90+2'	Live Report; Stats Report		Stadium: Hong Kong Stadium; Attendance: 7,771; Referee: Adham Makhadmeh (Jordan)

4 April 2018	Kitchee (Hong Kong)	0–1	(China) Tianjin Quanjian	Hong Kong
20:00 UTC+8		Live Report; Stats Report	Modeste 89'	Stadium: Mong Kok Stadium; Attendance: 6,299; Referee: Muhammad Taqi (Singapore)

18 April 2018	Jeonbuk Hyundai Motors (South Korea)	3–0	(Hong Kong) Kitchee	Jeonju, South Korea
20:00 UTC+9	Lee Seung-gi 72'; Kim Shin-wook 79'; Lim Sun-young 87'	Live Report; Stats Report		Stadium: Jeonju World Cup Stadium; Attendance: 4,487; Referee: Chris Beath (Australia)

== Statistics ==
=== Appearances ===
No.	Pos.	Name	League			Shield & FA Cup			Sapling & Community			Champions League			Total			Discipline	
No.	Pos.	Name	Apps	Goals	Asts	Apps	Goals	Asts	Apps	Goals	Asts	Apps	Goals	Asts	Apps	Goals	Asts	Yellow card	Red card
1	GK	(Hong Kong) Wang Zhenpeng	4	0	0	1	0	0	0	0	0	0	0	0	5	0	0	0	0
2	DF	(Spain) Fernando Recio	0 (3)	0	0	1	0	1	1	0	0	0	0	0	2 (3)	0	1	0	0
3	DF	(Spain) Dani Cancela	2 (1)	0	1	0	0	0	1	0	1	0	0	0	3 (1)	0	2	1	0
5	DF	(Hong Kong) Hélio	4	0	0	1	0	0	1	0	0	0	0	0	6	0	0	0	0
6	MF	(Hong Kong) (Germany) Lam Zhi-Gin	3	0	0	0	0	0	0	0	0	0	0	0	3	0	0	1	0
7	MF	(Brazil) Fernando	3	1	1	1	1	1	1	0	0	0	0	0	5	2	2	1	0
8	FW	(Hong Kong) Alex Akande	1 (2)	0	0	0 (1)	1	0	1	1	0	0	0	0	2 (3)	2	0	2	0
9	FW	(Brazil) Lucas	4	4	1	1	1	0	0	0	0	0	0	0	5	5	1	1	0
10	MF	(Hong Kong) Lam Ka Wai	0	0	0	1	1	0	1	0	0	0	0	0	2	1	0	1	0
11	FW	(Hong Kong) Sandro	2 (2)	2	0	1	1	0	1	0	0	0	0	0	4 (2)	3	0	1	0
12	DF	(Hong Kong) Lo Kwan Yee	1 (1)	1	1	0	0	0	1	0	0	0	0	0	2 (1)	1	1	0	0
15	FW	(Hong Kong) Christian Annan	0 (1)	0	0	0 (1)	0	0	1	1	1	0	0	0	1 (2)	1	1	0	0
16	MF	(Hong Kong) (Australia) Jared Lum	4	1	1	0 (1)	0	0	0	0	0	0	0	0	4 (1)	1	1	0	0
17	FW	(Hong Kong) Paulinho	0	0	0	0	0	0	0	0	0	0	0	0	0	0	0	0	0
19	MF	(Hong Kong) Huang Yang	4	0	0	0	0	0	0	0	0	0	0	0	4	0	0	1	0
20	MF	(Hong Kong) (Canada) Matt Lam	2 (1)	0	2	1	0	0	0	0	0	0	0	0	3 (1)	0	3	1	0
21	DF	(Hong Kong) Tong Kin Man	2 (1)	0	0	1	0	1	0	0	0	0	0	0	3 (1)	0	1	0	0
23	DF	(Hong Kong) Guo Jianqiao	0	0	0	0	0	0	1	0	0	0	0	0	1	0	0	0	0
32	MF	(Hungary) Krisztián Vadócz	4	2	0	1	0	0	1	0	0	0	0	0	6	2	0	0	0
34	MF	(Hong Kong) (Israel) Barak Braunshtain	0	0	0	0	0	0	0 (1)	0	0	0	0	0	0 (1)	0	0	0	0
35	DF	(Hong Kong) (Philippines) Mark Swainston	0	0	0	0	0	0	0 (1)	0	0	0	0	0	0 (1)	0	0	0	0
36	FW	(Hong Kong) (England) Robert Stamp	0	0	0	0	0	0	0	0	0	0	0	0	0	0	0	0	0
38	DF	(South Korea) Kim Dong-Jin	0	0	0	0	0	0	0	0	0	0	0	0	0	0	0	0	0
67	FW	(Hong Kong) (England) Sebastian Buddle	0	0	0	0	0	0	0 (1)	0	0	0	0	0	0 (1)	0	0	1	0
90	DF	(South Korea) Kim Bong-Jin	4	0	0	1	0	0	0	0	0	0	0	0	5	0	0	0	0
Players who left the club in August/January transfer window or on loan

=== Top scorers ===
The list is sorted by shirt number when total goals are equal.

Rnk	Pos	No.	Player	League	Shield & FA Cup	Sapling & Community	Champions League	Total
1	FW	9	(Brazil) Lucas	4	1	0	0	5
2	FW	11	(Hong Kong) Sandro	2	1	0	0	3
3	MF	32	(Hungary) Krisztián Vadócz	2	0	0	0	2
3	MF	7	(Brazil) Fernando	1	1	0	0	2
3	FW	8	(Hong Kong) Alex Akande	0	1	1	0	2
6	DF	12	(Hong Kong) Lo Kwan Yee	1	0	0	0	1
6	MF	16	(Hong Kong) Jared Lum	1	0	0	0	1
6	MF	10	(Hong Kong) Lam Ka Wai	0	1	0	0	1
6	FW	15	(Hong Kong) Christian Annan	0	0	1	0	1
Own Goal				0	0	0	0	0
Total				11	5	2	0	18

=== Clean sheets ===
The list is sorted by shirt number when total appearances are equal.

Rnk	No.	Player	League	Shield & FA Cup	Sapling & Community	Champions League	Total
1	1	(Hong Kong) Wang Zhenpeng	2	1	0	0	3
2	23	(Hong Kong) Guo Jianqiao	0	0	0	0	0
3	30	(Hong Kong) Wong Tsz Ho	0	0	0	0	0
Total			2	1	0	0	3

== See also ==
- List of unbeaten football club seasons
