= 1991–92 Beşiktaş J.K. season =

Beşiktaş J.K.
1991–92 season
- President: (Turkey) Süleyman Seba
- Manager: (England) Gordon Milne
- Stadium: BJK İnönü Stadium
- Turkish Super League: 1st (10th title)
- Turkish Cup: Semi-finals
- European Cup: First round
- Turkish Super Cup: Winners

The 1991–92 season was the club's 34th season in the Turkish First Football League. It was also one of the club's most successful seasons. They won the Turkish First Football League for the 10th time in team history and their 3rd consecutive title setting a franchise record, as well as a shared league record then, however Galatasaray broke this record 8 years later by winning 4 consecutive titles (1996–2000). Beşiktaş set another league record by finishing the league undefeated, with 23 wins, 7 draws and 0 losses. They also continued their record setting unbeaten streak from last year making a total of 35 games unbeaten. Also a league record. The team was considered "legendary" due to all the milestones achieved that season. In the Turkish cup, Beşiktaş defeated Aydınspor 1–0 in the quarterfinals, but lost to Trabzonspor 1–2 in the semifinals. Trabzonspor would go on to win the cup. By finishing 1st last season Beşiktaş also qualified for the European Cup. In the first round they were eliminated by PSV Eindhoven 2-3 (1-1 at home and 1–2 away). Beşiktaş played Trabzonspor for the Presidents Cup, after a loss to Trabzonspor in the semifinals of the Turkish cup, the team redeemed itself by defeating Trabzon 2–1. Beşiktaş missed the TSYD Cup by 3 points. They beat Fenerbahçe 4-1 but lost to Galatasaray 2–3.

== European Cup ==
As the defending Turkish champions, Beşiktaş qualified for the 1991-92 European Cup.

=== First round ===
September 17, 1991	Beşiktaş (Turkey)	1 – 1	(Netherlands) PSV Eindhoven	Istanbul, Turkey
	Özdilek 80 (pen)'		Ellerman 27'	Stadium: BJK İnönü Stadium

October 2, 1991	PSV Eindhoven (Netherlands)	2 – 1	(Turkey) Beşiktaş	Eindhoven, Netherlands
	Vanenburg 25'; Bwalya 74'		Tekin 4'	Stadium: Philips Stadion

== Turkish Cup ==
Beşiktaş wasn't able to win the Turkish Cup, losing to Trabzonspor in the semifinals.

=== Quarter-finals ===
Beşiktaş (Turkey)	1 – 0	(Turkey) Aydınspor	Istanbul, Turkey
			Stadium: BJK İnönü Stadium

=== Semi-finals ===
Trabzonspor (Turkey)	2 – 1	(Turkey) Beşiktaş	Trabzon, Turkey
			Stadium: Hüseyin Avni Aker Stadium

== Turkish First Football League ==
Beşiktaş became the first team to finish 1st place undefeated. The team became "legendary" and is considered as one of the best teams in the history of Turkish football.

Pos	Team	Pld	W	D	L	GF	GA	GD	Pts	Qualification or relegation
1	Beşiktaş (C)	30	23	7	0	58	20	+38	76	Qualification to Champions League first round
2	Fenerbahçe	30	23	2	5	81	35	+46	71	Qualification to UEFA Cup first round
3	Galatasaray	30	19	3	8	54	35	+19	60	Qualification to UEFA Cup first round
4	Trabzonspor	30	16	7	7	56	31	+25	55	Qualification to Cup Winners' Cup first round
5	Aydınspor	30	13	5	12	38	39	−1	44	

Rules for classification: 1) points; 2) goal difference; 3) number of goals scored.
(C) Champions

=== Results by round ===
Round	1	2	3	4	5	6	7	8	9	10	11	12	13	14	15	16	17	18	19	20	21	22	23	24	25	26	27	28	29	30
Result	D	W	W	W	W	W	W	W	W	D	D	W	W	W	W	D	W	W	W	W	D	D	W	W	W	W	W	D	W	W
Position	7	6	1	1	1	1	1	1	1	1	1	1	1	1	1	1	1	1	1	1	2	2	1	1	1	1	1	1	1	1

Source: http://www.tff.org
W = Win; D = Draw; L = Loss

== See also ==
- List of unbeaten football club seasons
