= 2022–23 Kategoria Superiore Femra =

Kategoria Superiore Femra
- Season: 2022–23
- Dates: 24 September 2022 – 22 May 2023
- Champions: Vllaznia
- Champions League: Vllaznia
- Matches: 90
- Goals: 597 (6.63 per match)
- Top goalscorer: Valentina Troka (66 Goals)
- Biggest home win: Tirana 19–0 Lushnja (27 November 2022)
- Biggest away win: Lushnja 0–15 Tirana (6 May 2023); Teuta 0–15 Apolonia (22 April 2023)
- Highest scoring: Tirana 19–0 Lushnja (27 November 2022)
- Longest winning run: 18 matches Vllaznia
- Longest unbeaten run: 18 matches Vllaznia
- Longest winless run: 16 matches Kukësi
- Longest losing run: 16 matches Kukësi

The 2022–23 Kategoria Superiore Femra was the 14th season of women's professional football, organized by the Albanian Football Federation.

Locations of teams from the 2022–23 season

== League table ==
Pos	Team	Pld	W	D	L	GF	GA	GD	Pts
1	Vllaznia (Note: Vllaznia qualified to the UEFA Champions League first round.) (C)	18	18	0	0	127	1	+126	54
2	Tirana	18	16	0	2	111	13	+98	48
3	Apolonia	18	14	0	4	120	10	+110	42
4	Partizani	18	11	1	6	64	31	+33	34
5	Kinostudio	18	9	0	9	66	67	−1	27
6	Laçi	18	8	1	9	42	59	−17	25
7	Teuta	18	7	0	11	39	91	−52	21
8	Skënderbeu (Note: Skënderbeu was deducted 6 points after not showing up in matches against Partizani and Teuta.)	18	3	0	15	9	109	−100	3
9	Kukësi (Note: Kukësi was deducted 6 points after leaving the pitch during a match against Kinostudio and not showing up in a match against Tirana.)	18	2	0	16	15	87	−72	0
10	Lushnja (Note: Lushnja was deducted 3 points after leaving the pitch during a match against Apolonia.)	18	1	0	17	4	129	−125	0

Updated to match(es) played on 22 May 2023. Source: FSHF
(C) Champions

== Results ==
Home \ Away	APF	KIN	KUK	LAÇ	LUS	PAR	SKË	TEU	TIR	VLL
Apolonia	—	9–0	10–0	6–0	11–0	4–1	7–0	7–0	0–1	1–2
Kinostudio	0–3	—	5–0	6–2	12–0	2–3	11–1	5–1	0–6	0–7
Kukësi	0–9	0–3	—	0–5	0–1	0–6	9–0	0–4	0–3	0–7
Laçi	0–9	4–2	5–0	—	4–0	1–2	4–0	1–2	0–5	0–12
Lushnja	0–14	1–5	0–4	0–5	—	0–5	0–1	1–2	0–15	0–5
Partizani	0–2	4–1	5–0	2–2	14–0	—	3–0	5–1	2–3	0–6
Skënderbeu	0–13	1–6	3–1	0–5	2–1	0–5	—	0–6	0–10	0–6
Teuta	0–15	4–6	10–1	0–2	6–0	0–7	3–0	—	0–7	0–6
Tirana	1–0	6–2	3–0	5–2	19–0	2–0	10–1	15–0	—	0–3
Vllaznia	5–0	15–0	8–0	8–0	5–0	7–0	9–0	13–0	3–0	—

Updated to match(es) played on 22 May 2023. Source:
Legend: Blue = home team win; Yellow = draw; Red = away team win.
For upcoming matches, an "a" indicates there is an article about the rivalry between the two participants.
