= 2022 FFAS Senior League =

FFAS Senior League
- Season: 2022
- Dates: 30 July – 3 December 2022
- Champions: Ilaoa and To'omata (1st title)
- Champions League: Ilaoa and To'omata
- Matches: 105
- Goals: 498 (4.74 per match)
- Top goalscorer: Tino Vaifale (31 goals)
- Biggest home win: Pago Youth 15–0 Tafuna Jets (1 October 2022)
- Biggest away win: Taputimu Youth 0–9 Pago Youth (5 September 2022)
- Highest scoring: Pago Youth 15–0 Tafuna Jets (1 October 2022)

The 2022 FFAS Senior League was the 41st season of the FFAS Senior League, top American Samoan league for association football clubs since its establishment in 1976. Vaiala Tongan were the defending champions, having won their first FFAS Senior League, although Ilaoa and To'omata won the 2022 FFAS Senior League undefeated.

== Teams ==
Eleven teams competed in the league following the return Taputimu Youth since 2019.

- Black Roses
- Green Bay
- Ilaoa and To'omata
- Lion Heart
- Pago Youth
- PanSa
- Royal Puma
- Tafuna Jets
- Taputimu Youth
- Utulei Youth
- Vaiala Tongan

== League table ==
Pos	Team	Pld	W	D	L	GF	GA	GD	Pts	Qualification
1	Ilaoa and To'omata (C)	20	16	4	0	87	12	+75	52	Qualification for the OFC Champions League qualifying stage
2	Pago Youth	20	15	4	1	103	19	+84	49	
3	Royal Puma	20	14	4	2	61	19	+42	46	
4	Vaiala Tongan	20	9	4	7	61	49	+12	31	
5	Utulei Youth	20	9	2	9	45	42	+3	29	
6	Lion Heart	20	8	1	11	31	52	−21	25	
7	PanSa	20	7	3	10	37	39	−2	24	
8	Green Bay	20	6	4	10	33	57	−24	22	
9	Black Roses	20	5	2	13	27	75	−48	17	
10	Taputimu Youth	20	4	1	15	23	89	−66	13	
11	Tafuna Jets	20	2	1	17	20	75	−55	7	

Updated to match(es) played on unknown. Source: RSSSF
Rules for classification: 1) Points; 2) Goal difference; 3) Goals scored
(C) Champions

== Results ==
Home \ Away	BLA	GRE	ILA	LIO	PAG	PAN	ROY	TAF	TAP	UTU	VAI
Black Roses	—	3–0^{a}	1–8	0–2	0–8	0–3	0–3	2–0	2–1	0–4	1–5
Green Bay	2–2	—	0–8	0–3^{a}	2–4	1–0	0–1	3–1	6–2	1–3	0–3^{a}
Ilaoa and To'omata	7–0	12–0	—	6–0	3–3	2–1	3–3	6–0	3–0	4–1	4–1
Lion Heart	4–2	1–4	0–4	—	1–0	1–3	0–0	0–3^{a}	2–3	3–0^{a}	2–1
Pago Youth	8–1	1–1	0–0	8–2	—	2–2	3–0	15–0	10–2	4–0	5–1
PanSa	2–2	3–4	0–1	3–0^{a}	1–4	—	2–4	2–1	0–2	4–1	1–3
Royal Puma	6–0	1–0	2–2	4–0	0–2	3–0	—	3–2	12–0	2–1	6–1
Tafuna Jets	0–3^{a}	1–2	0–3^{a}	0–4	0–7	0–3	1–2	—	4–1	1–6	2–2
Taputimu Youth	2–4	3–2	0–3^{a}	1–4	0–9	1–5	0–5	3–2	—	1–3	1–1
Utulei Youth	4–2	2–2	0–3	2–1	2–4	1–1	1–3	2–1	5–0	—	5–1
Vaiala Tongan	6–2	3–3	0–5	8–1	1–6	6–1	1–1	6–1	7–0	4–2	—

Source: RSSSF
Legend: Blue = home team win; Yellow = draw; Red = away team win.

^{a} Awarded

== Season statistics ==
=== Top scorers ===
Rank	Player	Club	Goals
1	(American Samoa) Tino Vaifale	Ilaoa and To'omata	31
2	(American Samoa) Petu Pouli	Vaiala Tongan	16
3	(American Samoa) Nofomuli Uitala	Vaiala Tongan	15
4	(American Samoa) Deacon Misi	Green Bay	14
5	(American Samoa) Johnica Collins	Pago Youth FC	13
5	(American Samoa) Fau Fe'a	Royal Puma	13
5	(American Samoa) Joe Koroiadi	Ilaoa and To'omata	13
5	(American Samoa) Milo Tiatia	Royal Puma	13
9	(American Samoa) Mark Taga'i	Ilaoa and To'omata	12
10	(American Samoa) Kevin Seong	Pago Youth FC	11
10	(American Samoa) Tia Silao	Pago Youth FC	11
12	(American Samoa) Ryan Samuelu	Pago Youth FC	10
12	(Fiji) Krishnan Chand	Utulei Youth	10
14	(American Samoa) Tolu Penitusi	Pago Youth FC	9
14	(American Samoa) Edward Loke	PanSa East	9
15	(American Samoa) Puni Samuelu	Pago Youth FC	8
16	(South Korea) Gun-Chul Kang	Royal Puma	7
16	(American Samoa) Tevita Talaga	Vaiala Tongan	7
