= 2023 FFAS Senior League =

FFAS Senior League
- Season: 2023
- Dates: 5 August – 4 November 2023
- Champions: Royal Puma (1st title)
- Champions League: Royal Puma
- Top goalscorer: (South Korea) Gun Chul Kang (5)

The 2023 FFAS Senior League was the 42nd season of the FFAS Senior League, top American Samoan league for association football clubs since its establishment in 1976. Ilaoa and To'omata were the defending champions, having won their first FFAS Senior League. The league was won by Royal Puma for the club's first title.

== Teams ==
Eleven teams competed in the league.

- Black Roses
- Green Bay
- Ilaoa and To'omata
- Lion Heart
- Pago Youth
- PanSa
- Royal Puma
- Tafuna Jets
- Taputimu Youth
- Utulei Youth
- Vaiala Tongan

== League table ==
Each club played a 10-match schedule, followed by play-off rounds for the top and bottom halves of the table. Tafuna Jets did not enter the play-off rounds after forfeiting multiple matches.

Pos	Team	Pld	W	D	L	GF	GA	GD	Pts	Qualification
1	Royal Puma (C)	20	18	1	1	107	17	+90	55	
2	Pago Youth	20	16	2	2	118	30	+88	50	
3	Ilaoa and To'omata	20	16	0	4	92	29	+63	48	
4	PanSa	20	10	5	5	57	37	+20	35	
5	Utulei Youth	20	9	4	7	40	37	+3	31	
6	Vaiala Tongan	20	8	3	9	62	67	−5	27	Qualification for the Champions League qualifying stage
7	Lion Heart	20	6	5	9	48	63	−15	23	
8	Black Roses	20	6	0	14	39	96	−57	18	
9	Green Bay	20	4	5	11	49	93	−44	17	
10	Taputimu Youth	20	2	2	16	37	101	−64	8	
11	Tafuna Jets	20	1	1	18	18	97	−79	4	

Updated to match(es) played on unknown. Source: Fiji Football Association
Rules for classification: 1) Points; 2) Goal difference; 3) Goals scored
(C) Champions

Home \ Away	ROY	PAG	ILA	PAN	UTU	VAI	LIO	BLA	GRE
Royal Puma									
Pago Youth									
Ilaoa and To'omata									
PanSa									
Utulei Youth									
Vaiala Tongan									
Lion Heart									
Black Roses									
Green Bay									

Legend: Blue = home team win; Yellow = draw; Red = away team win.
