= 2006 Campeonato da 1ª Divisão do Futebol =

1ª Divisão
- Season: 2006
- Champions: Lam Pak
- Matches: 90
- Goals: 362 (4.02 per match)

In the 2006 Campeonato da 1ª Divisão do Futebol, Lam Pak won the championship.

== League standings ==
Pos	Team	Pld	W	D	L	GF	GA	GD	Pts
1	Lam Pak	18	15	3	0	64	8	+56	48
2	Monte Carlo	18	13	3	2	65	23	+42	42
3	Vá Luen	18	8	8	2	32	27	+5	32
4	Kin Chong	18	8	1	9	34	23	+11	25
5	Heng Tai	18	6	4	8	35	53	−18	22
6	Kuan Tai	18	6	3	9	27	42	−15	21
7	Polícia de Segurança Pública	18	6	3	9	25	37	−12	21
8	Hoi Fan	18	6	3	9	29	42	−13	21
9	Serviços de Alfândega	18	2	6	10	28	56	−28	12
10	Macao U-18	18	2	2	14	23	51	−28	8
