= Academica De Ingore =

Académico de Ingoré FC
- Full name: Académico de Ingoré FC
- Ground: Avenida Principal de Ingoré; Ingoré, Guinea-Bissau
- Capacity: 5,000
- League: Campeonato Nacional da Guiné-Bissau

Académica de Ingoré is a Guinea-Bissauan football club based in Ingoré (Bigene Sector). The club most recently played in the first division in Guinean football, the Campeonato Nacional da Guiné-Bissau, during the 2013 season.
