= Lithuanian Women's Cup =

LFF moterų taurė
- Founded: 1994
- Region: Lithuania
- Current champions: Gintra Universitetas
- Most championships: Gintra Universitetas (12 titles)

The Lithuanian Women's Cup (Lithuanian: LFF moterų taurė) is the annual cup competition of women's football teams in Lithuania.

== Format ==
In current years the cup is played in two groups. The group winners contest the final.

== List of finals ==
The list of finals: No editions held from 1999 to 2001.

Season	Champion	Result	Runner-up
1994/95	Politechnika Kaunas	5-0	Vilija Vilnius
1995	Gabija-Politechnika Kaunas	2-1	FM Vilnius
1996	Gabija-Politechnika Kaunas	4-1	Zemaitija Telsiai
1996/97	Gabija-Politechnika Kaunas	1-0	Kristina Vilnius
1997/98	Kristina Vilnius	1-0	Politechnika Kaunas
2002	TexTilitė Ukmergė	6-0	FM Vilnius
2003	TexTilitė Ukmergė	2-1	Gintra Universitetas
2004	TexTilitė Ukmergė	7-1	Kreontas-FM Vilnius
2005	Gintra Universitetas	2-0	TexTilitė Ukmergė
2006	Gintra Universitetas	2-0	FK Akmenė
2007	Gintra Universitetas	4-0	TexTilitė Ukmergė
2008	Gintra Universitetas	3-1	TexTilitė Ukmergė
2009	Gintra Universitetas	7-0	FK Akmenė
2010	Gintra Universitetas	6-0	FM Kaunas
2011	Gintra Universitetas	7-0	FM Kaunas
2012	Gintra Universitetas	3-0	TexTilitė Ukmergė
2013	Gintra Universitetas	3-0	Kauno FM Žara
2014	Gintra Universitetas	2-0	MFA Žalgiris
2015	Gintra Universitetas		
2016	Gintra Universitetas	10-0	Kauno LSU-Žaros
2017			
2018			

== See also ==
- Lithuanian Football Cup, men's equivalent
