= 2001–02 Ismaily SC season =

Ismaily SC
2001–02 season
- Chairman: Ismail Osman
- Manager: Mohsen Saleh
- Stadium: Ismailia Stadium
- Egyptian Premier League: 1st
- Egypt Cup: Quarter-finals
- African Cup Winners' Cup: Quarter-finals
- Top goalscorer: League: Abdel Hamid Bassiouny (8); All: Abdel Hamid Bassiouny (11)
- Biggest win: Ismaily 5–0 Sohag

The 2001–02 Ismaily SC season was the club's 91st season in existence and the 31st consecutive season in the top flight of Egyptian football. In addition to the domestic league, Ismaily participated in this season's editions of the Egypt Cup and the African Cup Winners' Cup. The season covered the period from 1 July 2001 to 30 June 2002.

The team had a remarkable season, playing 34 games and suffering just one defeat.

== Pre-season and friendlies ==
Win Draw Loss

== Competitions ==
=== Overview ===
Competition	First match	Last match	Starting round	Final position	Record							
Competition	First match	Last match	Starting round	Final position	Pld	W	D	L	GF	GA	GD	Win %
Egyptian Premier League	26 September 2001	2 June 2002	Matchday 1	Winners	26	20	6	0	52	14	+38	76.92
Egypt Cup	29 December 2001	7 February 2002	First round	Quarter-finals	6	2	3	1	11	6	+5	33.33
African Cup Winners' Cup	9 September 2001	23 September 2001	Quarter-finals	Quarter-finals	2	0	2	0	1	1	+0	0.00
Total					34	22	11	1	64	21	+43	64.71

Source: Competitions

=== Egyptian Premier League ===
==== League table ====
Pos	Team	Pld	W	D	L	GF	GA	GD	Pts	Qualification or relegation
1	Ismaily (C)	26	20	6	0	52	14	+38	66	Qualification for the Champions League
2	Al Ahly	26	20	4	2	50	17	+33	64	Qualification for the CAF Cup
3	Zamalek	26	16	5	5	58	37	+21	53	Qualification for the Champions League
4	Ghazl Al-Mehalla	26	9	8	9	28	28	0	35	
5	Al Mokawloon Al Arab	26	8	9	9	32	31	+1	33	

Rules for classification: 1) Points; 2) Head-to-Head points; 3) Head-to-Head goal difference; 4) Head-to-Head goal scored; 5) Head-to-Head away goal scored; 6) Goal difference; 7) Goal scored.
(C) Champions

==== Results summary ====
Overall								Home						Away					
Pld	W	D	L	GF	GA	GD	Pts	W	D	L	GF	GA	GD	W	D	L	GF	GA	GD
0	0	0	0	0	0	0	0	0	0	0	0	0	0	0	0	0	0	0	0

Last updated: August 2022.

==== Results by round ====
Round	1	2	3	4	5	6	7	8	9	10	11
Ground	H	A	H	A	A	H	A	H	A	H	A
Result	W	W	D	W	W	W	W	W	D	D	W
Position	3	2	2	2	1	1	1	1	1		

Updated to match(es) played on August 2022. Source:
A = Away; H = Home; W = Win; D = Draw; L = Loss

==== Matches ====
26 September 2001 1	Ismaily	2–0	Tersana	Ismailia
				Stadium: Ismailia Stadium

1 October 2001 2	Goldi	0–2	Ismaily	Faiyum
				Stadium: Faiyum Stadium

6 October 2001 3	Ismaily	0–0	Zamalek	Ismailia
				Stadium: Ismailia Stadium

14 October 2001 4	El Mansoura	0–2	Ismaily	Mansoura
				Stadium: El Mansoura Stadium

19 October 2001 5	Ghazl El Mahalla	0–1	Ismaily	El Mahalla El Kubra
				Stadium: Ghazl El Mahalla Stadium

26 October 2001 6	Ismaily	5–0	Sohag	Ismailia
				Stadium: Ismailia Stadium

2 November 2001 7	Al Mokawloon Al Arab	0–2	Ismaily	Cairo
				Stadium: Osman Ahmed Osman Stadium

19 November 2001 8	Ismaily	4–0	Ghazl El Suez	Ismailia
				Stadium: Ismailia Stadium

24 November 2001 9	El-Ittihad El-Iskandary	0–0	Ismaily	Alexandria

7 December 2001 11	El Qanah	1–3	Ismaily	Ismailia
				Stadium: Suez Canal Stadium

14 December 2001 12	Ismaily	1–0	El Mahalla	Ismailia
				Stadium: Ismailia Stadium

22 December 2001 13	Al Masry	0–1	Ismaily	Port Said
				Stadium: Port Said Stadium

16 February 2002 10	Ismaily	1–1	Al Ahly	Ismailia
				Stadium: Ismailia Stadium

1 March 2002 14	Tersana	1–1	Ismaily	Giza
				Stadium: Mit Okba Stadium

16 March 2002 15	Ismaily	1–0	Goldi	Ismailia
				Stadium: Ismailia Stadium

30 March 2002 16	Zamalek	3–4	Ismaily	Cairo
	Aboagye 54'; Emam 68' (pen.), 82' (pen.)		Bassiouny 12', 61'; Abdallah 31'; Barakat 43'	Stadium: Cairo International Stadium

3 April 2002 17	Ismaily	3–0	El Mansoura	Ismailia
				Stadium: Ismailia Stadium

7 April 2002 18	Ismaily	1–0	Ghazl El Mahalla	Ismailia
				Stadium: Ismailia Stadium

20 April 2002 19	Sohag	0–1	Ismaily	Sohag
			Fahim 71'	Stadium: Sohag Stadium

2 May 2002 20	Ismaily	1–0	Al Mokawloon Al Arab	Ismailia
				Stadium: Ismailia Stadium

11 May 2002 21	Ghazl El Suez	1–1	Ismaily	Suez
				Stadium: Suez Stadium; Attendance: 5,000

15 May 2002 22	Ismaily	3–0	El-Ittihad El-Iskandary	Ismailia
				Stadium: Ismailia Stadium

20 May 2002 23	Al Ahly	4–4	Ismaily	Cairo

24 May 2002 24	Ismaily	2–1	El Qanah	Ismailia
				Stadium: Ismailia Stadium

28 May 2002 25	El Mahalla	0–3	Ismaily	El Mahalla El Kubra
				Stadium: Baladiyet El Mahallah Stadium

2 June 2002 26	Ismaily	3–2	Al Masry	Ismailia
				Stadium: Ismailia Stadium

=== Egypt Cup ===
==== First round ====
29 December 2001 First leg	Suez	1–1	Ismaily	Suez
	Abdel Fattah 79' (pen.)		Moawad 61'	Stadium: Suez Stadium

4 January 2002 Second leg	Ismaily	3–0 (4–1 agg.)	Suez	Ismailia
				Stadium: Ismailia Stadium

==== Round of 16 ====
23 January 2002 First leg	El-Ittihad El-Iskandary	1–1	Ismaily	Alexandria
				Stadium: Alexandria Stadium

28 January 2002 Second leg	Ismaily	4–1 (5–2 agg.)	El-Ittihad El-Iskandary	Ismailia
				Stadium: Ismailia Stadium

==== Quarter-finals ====
2 February 2002 First leg	Ghazl El Mahalla	1–0	Ismaily	El Mahalla El Kubra
				Stadium: Ghazl El Mahalla Stadium

7 February 2002 Second leg	Ismaily	2–2 (2–3 agg.)	Ghazl El Mahalla	Ismailia
				Stadium: Ismailia Stadium

=== African Cup Winners' Cup ===
==== Quarter-finals ====
9 September 2001 First leg	Kaizer Chiefs (South Africa)	0–0	(Egypt) Ismaily	Johannesburg, South Africa
				Stadium: Ellis Park

23 September 2001 Second leg	Ismaily (Egypt)	1–1 (1 (a)–1 agg.)	(South Africa) Kaizer Chiefs	Ismailia
				Stadium: Ismailia Stadium
