= Desportivo Quelele =

Grupo Desportivo e Recreativo de Quelélé
- Full name: Grupo Desportivo e Recreativo de Quelélé
- Nickname(s): Quelélé
- Ground: Arena de Quelele; Quelele, Guinea-Bissau
- Capacity: 5,000
- League: Campeonato Nacional da 2ª Divisão

Grupo Desportivo e Recreativo de Quelélé is a Bissau-Guinean football club based in Quelele. They play in the 2 division in Guinean football, the Campeonato Nacional da da 2ª Divisão da Guine-Bissau.
