= El Parral =

- municipality
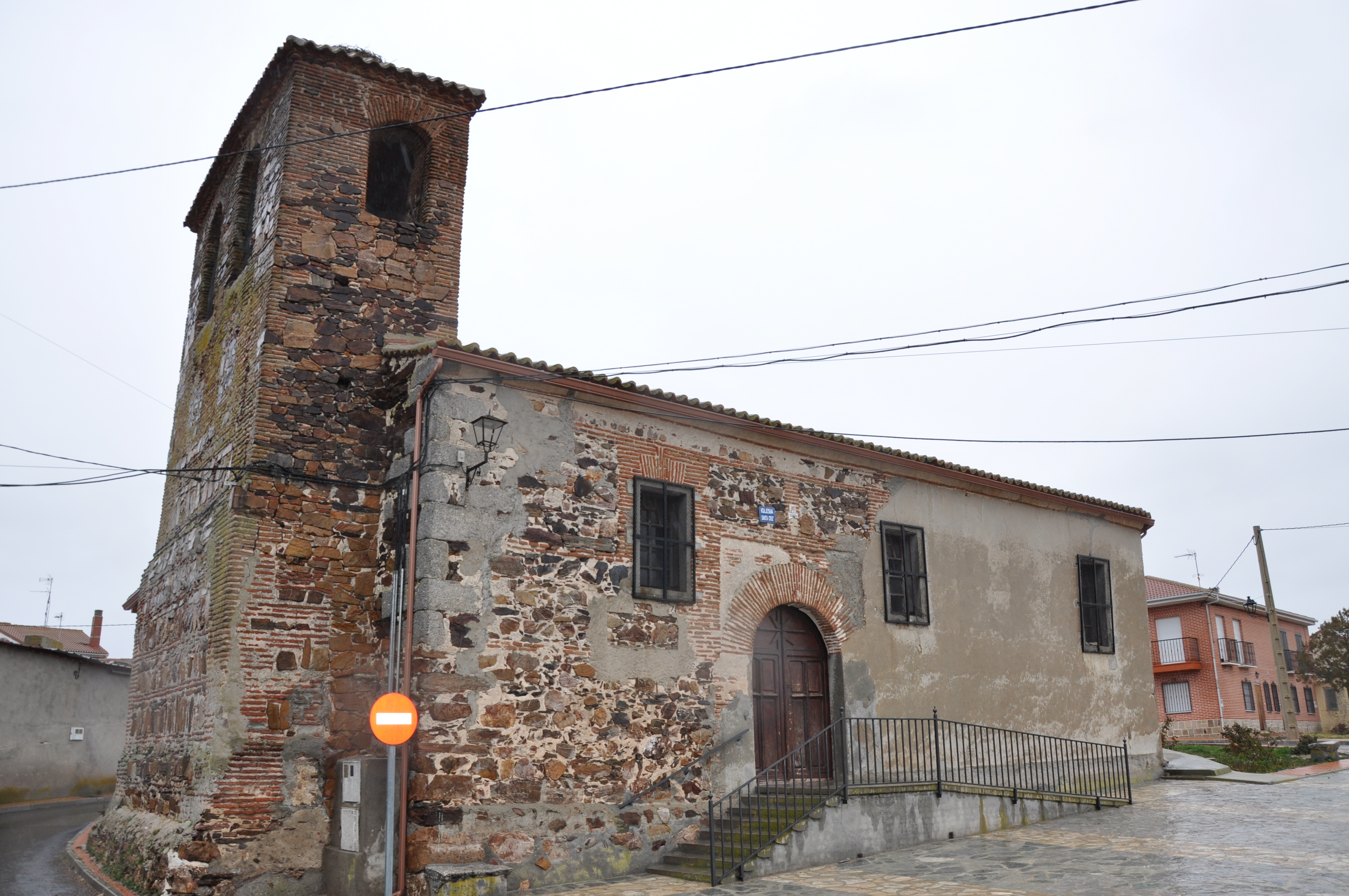
- Church of Santa Cruz, El Parral, Ávila,
- Flag Coat of arms
- Location in Spain. El Parral (Spain)
- Coordinates: 40°48′02″N 4°58′51″W
- Country: Spain
- Autonomous community: Castile and León
- Province: Ávila
- Municipality: El Parral

Area
  - Total: 10.89 km^{2} (4.20 sq mi)
- Elevation: 1,050 m (3,440 ft)

Population (2025-01-01)
  - Total: 64
  - Density: 5.9/km^{2} (15/sq mi)
- Time zone: UTC+1 (CET)
  - Summer (DST): UTC+2 (CEST)
- Website: Official website

El Parral is a municipality located in the province of Ávila, Castile and León, Spain.

== Population ==
Historical population
Year	Pop.	±% p.a.
2023	61	—
2024	62	+1.64%
2025	64	+3.23%
Source: INE
