= AC de Bissorã =

Atlético Clube de Bissorã
- Full name: Atlético Clube de Bissorã
- Founded: 1946
- Ground: Estádio Municipal de Bissorã
- Chairman: João Konaté
- Manager: Ebraim Cissé
- League: Guinea-Bissau Second Division
- 2022–23: 16th, Premier division (relegated)
Home colours	Away colours

Atlético Clube de Bissorã is a Guinea-Bissau football club located in Bissorã, Guinea-Bissau. It currently plays in Campeonato Nacional da Guiné-Bissau.

== History ==
The club was founded on 1 July 1946 during Portuguese control and an affiliate of Atlético Lisbon.

They played their first official competition in 1960, they played in what was the Portuguese Guinea Provincial Championships until full independence in 1974 (from 1973, also as the Guinea-Bissau Championships). They played in the lower divisions, they came to play in the First Division from the 2002 season.

In cup competitions, the club reached the 2004–05 final against Sporting Clube de Bissau (the club also finished second in the league to Sporting Clube) and lost 4–2. As Sporting Bissau were also national champions, the club came to play in the super cup match with that club and lost the title for 2005.

They won their only championship title in 2011. Bissorã had no appearance in the 2012 CAF Champions League due to financial concerns. In 2012, journalist Maria da Conceição Évora became the first chairwoman of any football clubs in Guinea-Bissau.

For the 2013 season, Atlético Bissorã finished 9th place for the season, once they were successful, they were the failures as they had the least for the season including 9 points and 10 goals and had 13 losses and was relegated into the Second Division, they finished 4th in 2014 and plays in the division since, in Série A.

== Honours ==
- Campeonato Nacional da Guiné-Bissau: 1

2011

== League and cup history ==
=== National level ===
Season	Div.	Pos.	Pl.	W	D	L	GS	GA	GD	P	Cup	Notes
2003–04	1	7	18	6	5	7	28	31	-3	23		
2004–05	1	2	21	10	8	3	27	16	+11	38	Finalist	
2006	1	9	22	6	6	10	16	33	-17	24		
2011	1	1										
2013	1	9	18	2	3	13	11	26	-15	9		
2014	2	4	-	-	-	-	-	-	-	-		

== Statistics ==
- Best position: 1st (national)
- Best position at cup competitions: Finalist (national)
