= Agril =

Guinea-Bissauan football club

- Full name: Agril
- Ground: Arena Maredgao; Agril, Guinea-Bissau
- Capacity: 5,000
- League: Campeonato Assotiation da Guine-Bissau

Agril is a Guinea-Bissauan football club based in Agril. The club played in the top level Campeonato Nacional da Guine-Bissau during the 1991–92 season.
