= Blofib =

- Full name: Blofib
- Ground: Blofib Terra; Catió, Guinea-Bissau
- Capacity: 5,000

Blofib is a Guinea-Bissauan football club based in Catió. The club played in the top level Campeonato Nacional da Guine-Bissau during the 1991–92 season.
