= FC Prabis =

F.C. Pràbis
- Full name: F.C. Pràbis
- Ground: Arena Maredgao; Prabis, Guinea-Bissau
- Capacity: 5,000
- League: Campeonato Assotiation da Guiné-Bissau
Home colours	Away colours

F.C. Prabis is a Bissau-Guinean football club based in Prabis. They play in the 2 division in Guinean football, the Campeonato Nacional da Guiné-Bissau.
