= Aguias Guine No Lanta =

Aguias Guine No Lanta is a Guinea-Bissauan football club based in Lanta. They compete in the second division of Guinean football, known as The Campeonato Nacional da 2ª Divisão da Guiné-Bissau.
