= EN Bolama =

- Full name: EN Bolama
- Founded: 1937
- Ground: Arena de Bolama; Bolama, Guinea-Bissau
- Capacity: 5,000
- League: Campeonato Assotiation da Guine-Bissau
- 2006: 6th

EN Bolama, also known by its full name Estrela Negra de Bolama, is a Guinea-Bissauan football club based in Bolama. It is one of two chief clubs of the entire Bijagos Archipelago, the other is FC Bijagós, for most of the time, it was the most popular club in the Bijagós Archipelago but remains the most successful. It is an affiliate to the Brazilian club CR Vasco da Gama. They play in the amateur division in Guinean football, the Campeonato Nacional da Guine-Bissau. The club won only a cup title in 1980.

== History ==
The club was founded in 1937 and is the oldest club in Bolama and the Bijagos (or Bissagos) Archipelago. In 1975, the club was refounded after independence in 1974.

The club once played in the First Division with came one time in 2004 and continued in 2005 and 2007, in 2015, the club returned to the First Division and played for only a season, the club finished 14th which was last place with 16 points. In 2015, the club was relegated to the Second Division and currently plays there. In the 2017 season, they finished fifth in Série C of the Second Division.

== Logo and uniform ==
Its logo color has a seal with a crest in the middle. Its logo and its uniforms are nearly the same as to the Brazilian club CR Vasco da Gama.

== Honour ==
- Guinea-Bissau Cup: 1

1980

== League and cup history ==
=== National level ===
Season	Div.	Pos.	Pl.	W	D	L	GS	GA	GD	P	Cup	Notes
2003–04	1	8	18	4	4	10	24	37	-13	16		
2004–05	1	8	21	7	3	11	35	37	-2	24		
2006	1	6	22	7	5	10	33	33	0	26		
