= Tombali SC =

- Full name: Tombali SC
- Ground: Catio Soccer Stadium; Catio, Guinea-Bissau
- Capacity: 5,000
- Chairman: Olívio Mendonça
- League: Campeonato Assotiation da Guine-Bissau

Tombali SC is a Guinea-Bissauan football club based in Catio. They currently play amateur soccer in the Guinea-Bissau Provincial Championship, the Campeonato Nacional da Guine-Bissau.

== Players ==
Note: Flags indicate national team as defined under FIFA eligibility rules; some limited exceptions apply. Players may hold more than one non-FIFA nationality.

No.	Pos.	Nation	Player
1	GK	(Guinea-Bissau) GNB	Manuel Lopes Lobu
2	GK	(Guinea-Bissau) GNB	Filomenio Durren
3	DF	(Guinea-Bissau) GNB	Manuel da Silva Boteliu
4	DF	(Guinea-Bissau) GNB	Lukas Pereira Monteiro
5	DF	(Guinea-Bissau) GNB	Lopu Almeida Enriquesh
6	DF	(Guinea-Bissau) GNB	Osagie Jim
7	DF	(Guinea-Bissau) GNB	Francescu Jose Muachu
8	DF	(Guinea-Bissau) GNB	Elder Sa Sambu
9	MF	(Guinea-Bissau) GNB	Cabral Vieira
10	MF	(Guinea-Bissau) GNB	Jussuf Bissi
11	MF	(Guinea-Bissau) GNB	Ninkayo Saldania

No.	Pos.	Nation	Player
12	MF	(Guinea-Bissau) GNB	Tao-Taoty Delachansa
13	MF	(Guinea-Bissau) GNB	Manuel Pintu de Guveya
14	MF	(Guinea-Bissau) GNB	Martinio de Augusto
15	MF	(Guinea-Bissau) GNB	Romisio da Brazete
16	MF	(Guinea-Bissau) GNB	Jean Bosca
17	FW	(Guinea-Bissau) GNB	Rafael Pele
18	FW	(Guinea-Bissau) GNB	Camutenya Dianu Fernando
19	FW	(Guinea-Bissau) GNB	Soaresh Luro
20	FW	(Guinea-Bissau) GNB	Franschku Roku Soto-Major
21	FW	(Guinea-Bissau) GNB	Rokardo Elio
22	FW	(Guinea-Bissau) GNB	Manuel Rodriguesh
