= Fulakunda =

West African Fula dialect

Fulakunda, also called Fulani or Fulacunda, is a dialect in the Fula language continuum. Fulakunda is primarily spoken in southern Senegal, specifically the Casamance region, the Gambia, and northern Guinea Bissau. This region is often referred to as Fuladou. It is spoken by the Fulakunda people, a sub-group of the Fulani or Fulbe. It is noted for the presence of many loanwords from Mandinka, although the two are not mutually intelligible.

Fulakunda is mutually intelligible with all other Fula dialects in Senegal, although it shares more similarities with Pulaar (also called Pulaar du Nord, the dialect of Fula spoken in the Senegal River Valley) than with Pula Futa, despite the latter's closer geographical range.

== Linguistic features ==
=== Negation and tenses ===
There are three verb forms, each of which have their own forms of negation, which vary by tense. Double negatives are a common part of the Fulakunda language, as in phrases like "mi annda heyhunde", or "I don't know nothing". The future and present habitual are conjugated the same, with the difference detectable by context. In present progressive affirmative, and for static verbs, long-form pronouns are used.

Example verb conjugation and negation
Class	Simple Past Affirmative	Simple Past Negative	Present Habitual /Future Affirmative	Present Habitual/ Future Negative
root + ude/de verbs (active)	root + ii	root + aani (frequently shortened to a)	Root + at	Root + ataa
Root + aade verbs (semi-reflexive)	root + iima	root + aaki	Root + oto	Root + otaako
-eede verbs (reflexive)	root + aama	root + aaka	Root + ete	Root + etaake

=== Noun classes ===
Fulakunda contains 21 noun classes. These noun classes can commonly be observed by looking at the suffix of a noun. For example, a noun that is the result of a loan word will typically end in -o (however, human singular nouns such as debbo (meaning woman) also end in -o). The class of the noun will often refer to the actual content of the noun. For example, the ɗam noun class is applied to nouns that describe a liquid. However, Fulakunda is a heavily irregular language, and so noun class will commonly break these rules and both observation and the general grouping of nouns should not be relied upon. A noun's determiner is the noun class, with the definite article form occurring after the noun (boggol ngol, the rope) and the demonstrative pronoun occurring before the noun (ngol boggol, this rope). The table below shows the noun classes in Fulakunda and what the class indicates the content of the noun to be:

Noun classes
Class	Content of noun
ngo	curved up at edges
ki	straight upright, trees, body parts, abstractions
o	humans, loanwords
nge	celestial bodies, bovines, abstractions
ndu	hollow, inflated, round
ba	animals
ɗam	liquids, abstractions, mass nouns
ɗum	certain loanwords
ka	objects, abstractions
kal	liquids in small quantity
ko	body parts, plants
nde	objects
ndi	male animals, augmentatives, nouns that cannot be counted
ngal	body parts, birds, augmentatives, trees
ngol	things that are long and thin, action nouns
ngel	diminutives
ngu	insects, fish, collectives, abstractions
ɗe	(plural) animals, objects
kon	(plural) diminutives
ɗi	(plural) animals, objects
ɓe	(plural) humans

=== Counting system ===
The Fulakunda counting system is base five (a quinary-decimal system) which is similar to the surrounding Niger-Congo languages. The number 7, for example, uses the prefix of joy (5) and the suffix ɗiɗi (2) becoming jeeɗiɗi (5+2). Other languages that use this system in West Africa include Pular, Wolof, Sereer-Sine and East Limba. These quinary-decimal counting languages can be found in the west African regions of Sierra Leone, Guinea and Gambia. Pulaar, Pular, and Fulakunda possess almost identical words for numbers, in which every number from 1 to 10 share the exact same name except for 5 (joy for Pulaar, jowi for Pular, and jooyi for Fulakunda).

=== Verb suffixes ===
The Fulacunda verb system contains multiple suffixes which can be added to verbs to change their cases. These suffixes include the -an suffixes, the -d suffixes, the -oy suffixes, and the -ir suffixes. Typically, multiple suffixes are not used in verbs, differentiating it from Pulaar.

Common Fulakunda suffixes
Suffix	Meaning	Example	Meaning
-an	to do for	yahde→yahande	to go for (as a favor)
-d	to do with (a person)	yahde → yahdude	to go → to go with
-oy	to go and do	namde→ namoyde	to eat →to go (somewhere) and eat
-ondir	to do to each other	Anndude→ anndondirde	to know → to know each other
-ir	to do by/with (tool or technique)	dogde → dogirde	to run →to run with (sneakers, etc)
-in	to make someone do	jangude → janginde	to read/study→to make someone read or study (also to teach)

=== Consonant mutation ===
Fulakunda has a significant amount of consonant mutation in the language, in many situations. For almost all plurals, the first consonant in the verb or noun will be transformed. Additionally, for verbs, when the pronoun is in post position, consonant transformation will take place. When speaking casually, occasionally speakers will transform consonants for no clear reason. These transformations will be applied to loan words as well. In some cases, particularly in the h → k and f → p pairs, the mutation will be bi-directional. S and t are also fully interchangeable in all instances, as are t and r, but s and r are not fully interchangeable.

Fulakunda consonant mutation guide
Initial	Transformed
vowels	ng+vowels
j/y	nj
s	c
r	d/nd
W+(a/e/i/u)	mb
w(o)	mb/ng
h	k
f	p
l	nd

== Orthography ==
Fulakunda today is primarily written in the Latin alphabet, with orthographic conventions in common with all indigenous languages of Senegal. The Latin alphabet has been standardized in various Senegalese government decrees, the latest of which was issued in 2005.

However, historically, similar to other indigenous languages of the region, such as the Wolof language, its first writing system was the adaption of Arabic script. Arabic script is used today as well, albeit in a smaller scale, and mostly limited to Islamic school teachers and students. The Arabic-based script of Pulaar, to be used for all Fula dialects within Senegal, was set by the government as well, between 1985 and 1990, although never adopted by a decree, as the effort by the Senegalese ministry of education was to be part of a multi-national standardization effort.

Fulakunda Latin alphabet
A a	Aa aa	B b	Mb mb	Ɓ ɓ	C c	D d	Nd nd	Ɗ ɗ	E e	Ee ee	F f	G g	Ng ng	H h	I i	Ii ii	J j	Nj nj
[a]	[aː]	[b]	[ᵐb]	[ɓ]	[t͡ʃ]‍~[c]‍	[d]	[ⁿd]	[ɗ]	[e]	[eː]	[f]	[ɡ]	[ᵑɡ]	[h]	[i]	[iː]	[d͡ʒ]~[ɟ]‍	[ᶮd͡ʒ]~[ᶮɟ]
K k	L l	M m	N n	Ñ ñ	Ŋ ŋ	O o	Oo oo	P p	R r	S s	T t	U u	Uu uu	W w	X x	Y y	Ƴ ƴ	’
[k]	[l]	[m]	[n]	[ɲ]	[ŋ]	[o]	[oː]	[p]	[r]	[s]	[t]	[u]	[uː]	[w]	[x]	[j]	[jˤ]	[ʔ]

Pulaar Ajami alphabet
Arabic (Latin) [IPA]	ا ‌( – / ’ / Aa aa ) [∅]/[ʔ]/[aː]	ب ‌(B b) [b]	ݒ ‌(P p) [p]	ࢠ ‌(Ɓ ɓ) [ɓ]	ت ‌(T t) [t]	ݖ ‌(C c) [t͡ʃ]‍~[c]‍
Arabic (Latin) [IPA]	ث ‌(S s) [s]	ج ‌(J j) [d͡ʒ]	ڃ ‌(Ƴ ƴ) [jˤ]	ح ‌(H h) [h]	خ ‌(K k) [k]([x])	د ‌(D d) [d]
Arabic (Latin) [IPA]	ذ ‌(J j) [d͡ʒ]([z])	ر (R r) [r]	ز ‌(J j) [d͡ʒ]([z])	س ‌(S s) [s]	ش ‌(S s) [s]([ʃ])	ص ‌(S s) [s]
Arabic (Latin) [IPA]	ض ‌(L l) [l]	ط ‌(Ɗ ɗ) [ɗ]	ظ ‌(J j) [d͡ʒ]	ع ‌(- / ’ ) [ʔ]	غ ‌(G g) [ɡ]	ݝ ‌(Ŋ ŋ) [ŋ]
Arabic (Latin) [IPA]	ف ‌(F f) [f]	ق ‌(Q q) [q]	ک ‌(K k) [k]	گ ‌(G g) [g]	ل ‌(L l) [l]	م ‌(M m) [m]
Arabic (Latin) [IPA]	ن ‌(N n) [n]	ݧـ ݧ ‌(Ñ ñ) [ɲ]	ه ‌(H h) [h]	و ‌(W w/Oo oo/Uu uu) [w]/[oː]/[uː]	ي ‌(Y y/Ee ee/Ii ii) [j]/[eː]/[iː]	

Vowel at the beginning of a word
A	E	I	O	U
Short vowels
اَ	اࣹ	اِ	اࣷ	اُ
Long vowels
Aa	Ee	Ii	Oo	Uu
آ	اࣹيـ / اࣹي	اِيـ / اِي	اࣷو	اُو

Vowel at the middle or end of a word
a	e	i	o	u	∅
Short vowels
◌َ	◌ࣹ	◌ِ	◌ࣷ	◌ُ	◌ْ
Long vowels
aa	ee	ii	oo	uu	
◌َا	◌ࣹيـ / ◌ࣹي	◌ِيـ / ◌ِي	◌ࣷو	◌ُو	

Prenasalized consonants are written as a digraph (combination of two consonants). While historically, there were single letter alternatives, these letters are no longer used. Prenasalized consonants are constructed using meem (م) or noon (ن) in combination with other consonants. The letter meem (م) appears in pairs with beh (ب), whereas the letter noon (ن) appears in pairs with dal (د), jeem (ج), and geh (گ).

Prenasalized consonants cannot take the zero-vowel diacritic sukun (◌ْ). If they are at the end of the word and have no vowels, they will take the gemination diacritic shadda (◌ّ).

Some consider these digraphs as their own independent letters.

Pulaar Ajami prenasalized consonant digraphs
Forms				Sound represented	Latin equivalent
Isolated	Final	Medial	Initial	Sound represented	Latin equivalent
مب	ـمبّ	ـمبـ	مبـ	[ᵐb]	mb
ند	ـندّ	ـند	ند	[ⁿd]	nd
نج	ـنجّ	ـنجـ	نجـ	[ᶮɟ]	nj
نگ	ـنگّ	ـنگـ	نگـ	[ᵑɡ]	ng

=== Sample text ===
Article 1 of the Universal Declaration of Human Rights.

Translation	Latin script	Ajami (Arabic) script
All human beings are born free and equal in dignity and rights. They are endowed with reason and conscience and should act towards one another in a spirit of brotherhood.	Innama aadeeji fof poti, ndimɗidi e jibinannde to bannge hakkeeji. Eɓe ngoodi miijo e hakkilantaagal ete eɓe poti huufo ndirde e nder ɓ iynguyummaagu.	
