= Taputimu Youth =

- Full name: Taputimu Youth
- Founded: 2016
- Stadium: Pago Park Soccer Stadium; Pago Pago, American Samoa
- Capacity: 2,000
- League: FFAS Senior League
Home colors

Taputimu Youth is an association football team from Pago Pago, American Samoa. They play in the territory's top division, the FFAS Senior League.

== Squad ==
2022 Squad Note: Flags indicate national team as defined under FIFA eligibility rules; some limited exceptions apply. Players may hold more than one non-FIFA nationality.

No.	Pos.	Nation	Player
1	MF	ASA	Sam Vaigafa
2	DF	ASA	Pou Tuutatau
3	DF	ASA	Zion Moala
4	MF	ASA	Josh Taylor
5	MF	ASA	Major Ma'ae
6	DF	ASA	Vestah Lauina
7	FW	ASA	Lipine Moevao
8	MF	ASA	Ionata Saumani

No.	Pos.	Nation	Player
9	FW	ASA	Peter Vaitoa
10	MF	ASA	Eddie Vaigafa
11	GK	ASA	Martin Lauvasa
12	DF	ASA	Tini Sipa
13	MF	ASA	Peniamina Tua
14	DF	ASA	Metthew Lagai
15	DF	ASA	Tuaoi Afoa
16	MF	ASA	Ausage Ausage
