= KFF Skënderbeu =

Albanian football club

- Full name: Klubi i Futbollit për Femra Skënderbeu Korçë
- Nicknames: Ujqërit e Dëborës; Bardhekuqtë; Juglindorët
- Founded: 11 November 2013; 12 years ago
- Ground: Skënderbeu Stadium
- Capacity: 5,724
- Owner: Bashkia Korçë
- President: Ardian Takaj
- Manager: Stavrion Lako
- League: Kategoria Superiore Femra
- 2023–24: 8th
- Website: kfskenderbeu.al
Home colours	Away colours

KFF Skënderbeu (Albanian pronunciation: [skəndɛɾbɛu kɔɾtʃə]) is an Albanian women's professional football club based in Korçë. They last competed in Kategoria Superiore Femra during the 2023–24 season, finishing 8th in a ten-team league.

== History ==
On 11 November 2013, Skënderbeu announced the reorganization of its women's team, appointing Stavrion Lako, a former footballer from the men's side, as coach. During the initial training sessions, many local girls participated, but over time, only the best were retained. On 27 December 2013, Skënderbeu played its first match in Korçë, a friendly against Elbasani, which they lost 5–2.

== Current squad ==
As of 17 September 2022

Note: Flags indicate national team as defined under FIFA eligibility rules; some limited exceptions apply. Players may hold more than one non-FIFA nationality.

No.	Pos.	Nation	Player
2	DF	ALB	Paulina Zizolli(Captain)
3	DF	ALB	Izaura Kajo
3	DF	ALB	Manjola Berberi
5	DF	ALB	Eleni Kullira
6	FW	ALB	Valbona Popa
7	MF	ALB	Erjana Morava
8	MF	ALB	Rafaela Zere
9	FW	ALB	Adela Qylalli
10	MF	ALB	Ana Shkëmbi (Captain)

No.	Pos.	Nation	Player
11	MF	ALB	Klarita Myrtollari
12	GK	ALB	Anjeza Popa
13	MF	ALB	Oksana Mucollari
14	MF	ALB	Joana Nicku
15	MF	ALB	Maria Nicku
15	MF	ALB	Adoranta Spaho
16	DF	ALB	Sabina Kasa
17	MF	ALB	Anxhela Sula
—	MF	ALB	Albina Rrahmani
