= Mavegro FC =

- Full name: Mavegro Futebol Clube
- Ground: Estádio Lino Correia; Bissau, Guinea-Bissau
- Capacity: 12,000
- League: Campeonato Nacional da Guine-Bissau
- 2010–11: 8th

Mavegro Futebol Clube, formerly called Ténis Clube de Bissau, is a Guinea-Bissauan football club based in Bissau. They play in the Campeonato Nacional da Guine-Bissau.

They were runners-up in the Campeonato Nacional da Guine-Bissau in 2008. They have the Taça Nacional da Guiné Bissau won on three occasions: 1994 (as Ténis Clube de Bissau), 2002, and 2004. They may also have been runners-up in 2000, but it is not certain that the competition was played in that year.

== Achievements ==
- Taça Nacional da Guiné Bissau: 1

1994
