= Catio Tour =

Annual event in Portland, Oregon, U.S.

- Logo
- Status: Active
- Frequency: Annually
- Location: Portland, Oregon
- Country: United States
- Attendance: 1,000 (2018)

The Catio Tour is an annual event in Portland, Oregon, United States. Described as a tour of cat enclosures (or "catios"), the event was established as part of the Cats Safe at Home Campaign, which is sponsored by the Feral Cat Coalition of Oregon (FCCO) and Portland Audobon. Portland Monthly has described the partnership between FCCO and Portland Audobon as "unusual". Animal Services of Multnomah and Washington counties have also been credited as supporters. The event seeks to encourage outdoor cat activity while protecting bird populations.

The 2016 tour included eight catios. Approximately 1,000 people attended the 2018 event. In 2020, the tour was virtual because of the COVID-19 pandemic. The 2023 tour had seven locations, and the 2024 tour was held in both Portland and Vancouver, Washington. One backyard in 2026 has replicas of some of Portland's bridges.

== See also ==
- Cat fancy
- Cat predation on wildlife
- Cats in the United States
- Culture of Portland, Oregon
- Purrington's Cat Lounge, a former cat café in Portland
