= Petting zoo =

Zoo where visitors can touch the animals

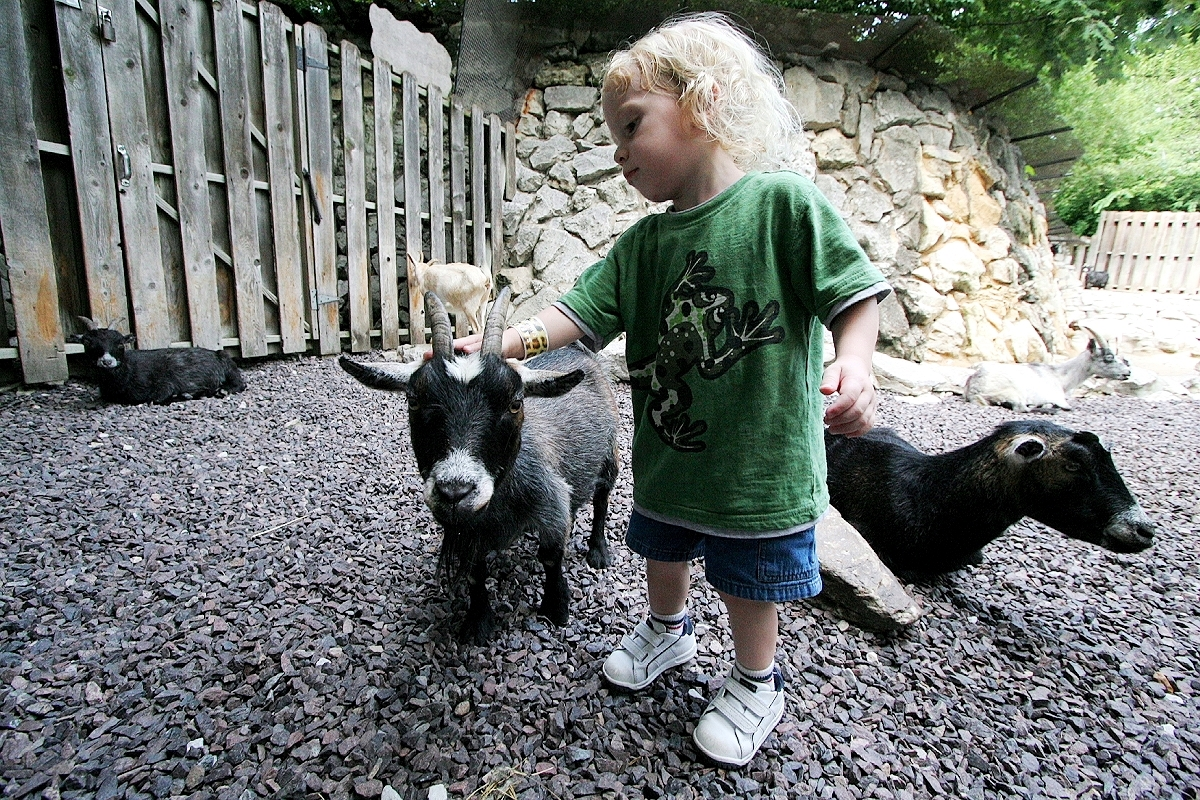
Child petting a domestic goat at the "Little Kids" Children's Zoo, St. Louis Zoo, St. Louis, Missouri, US

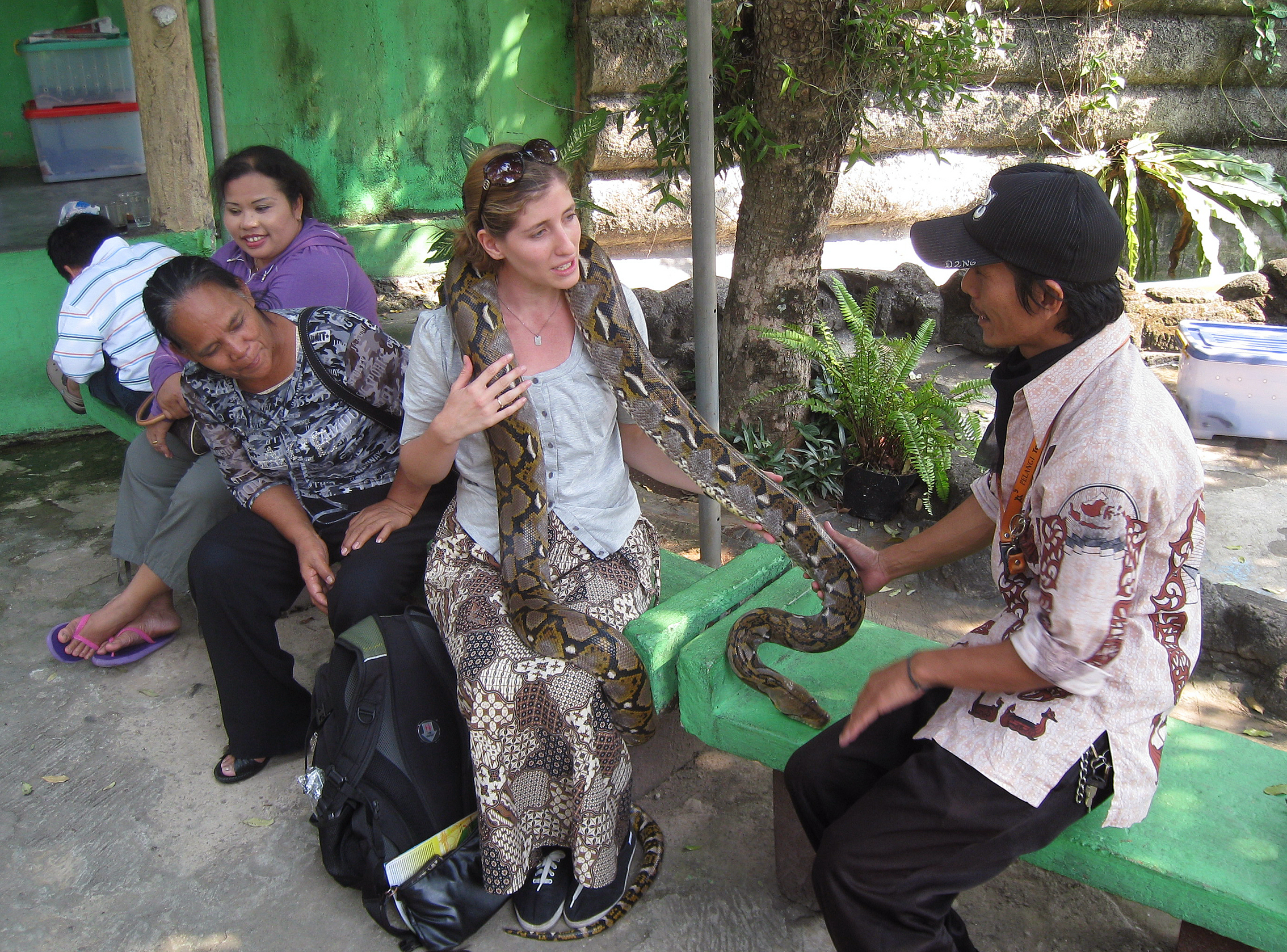
A zoo visitor interacts with a reticulated python at the Reptile Park in Taman Mini Indonesia Indah, Jakarta, Indonesia.

A petting zoo (also called a children's zoo, children's farm, or petting farm) is a zoo that allows visitors to touch and feed the animals. In addition to independent petting zoos, many general zoos contain a petting zoo.

Most petting zoos are designed to provide only relatively placid, herbivorous domesticated animals, such as sheep, goats, rabbits, ponies and donkeys to feed and interact physically with safety. This is in contrast to the usual zoo experience, where normally wild animals are viewed from behind safe enclosures where no contact is possible. A few provide wild species (such as pythons or big cat cubs) to interact with, but these are rare and usually found outside Western nations. Petting zoos are categorized as part of the agritourism sector.

Concerns have been raised about the welfare of animals in petting zoos, particularly due to interactions with large numbers of visitors, which can be stressful. Under appropriate conditions, where animals have access to refuge and can avoid visitors, friendly species such as goats may be unaffected, while more sensitive animals, such as pigs, may alter their behavior, especially under high visitor density. Highly sensitive animals, including rabbits, experience persistent stress from human contact, even during calm petting, as indicated by hormonal and behavioral responses such as eye closure and pressed back. In contrast, some animals, such as horses, may find gentle petting in preferred areas positive. The Environmental Literacy Council recommends that petting zoos provide rest periods and areas inaccessible to visitors, adequate space and enrichment, veterinary care, and clear guidelines for interaction. Such guidelines are particularly important for young children, whose behavior may be unpredictable and stressful for animals.

== History ==
In 1938, the London Zoo included the first children's zoo in Europe and the Philadelphia Zoo was the first in North America to open a special zoo just for children.

During the 1990s, Dutch cities began building petting zoos in many neighbourhoods, so that urban children could interact with animals.

== Animals and food ==
Petting zoos feature a variety of domestic animals. Common animals include cattle, zebu, yaks, sheep, goats, rabbits, guinea pigs, ponies, alpacas, llamas, pigs, miniature donkeys, miniature horses, ducks, geese, chickens, and turkeys. They occasionally contain several exotic animals such as kangaroos, wallabies, emus, swans, deer, zebras, parrots, porcupines, camels, ostriches, bison, water buffaloes, rheas, peafowl, guinea fowl, antelopes, capybaras, lemurs, tortoises and many others.

Petting zoos are popular with small children, who will often feed the animals. In order to ensure the animals' health, the food is supplied by the zoo, either from vending machines or a kiosk. Food often fed to animals includes grass or hay, pellets, or crackers. Such feeding is an exception to the usual rule about not feeding animals.

== Mobile petting zoos ==
Some petting zoos are also mobile and will travel to a home for a children's party or event. Many areas have a qualified mobile petting zoo. One of the first mobile petting zoos in Australia (begun in 1992), was Kindifarm. As a result of its popularity, many Australians use the term kindy farms to describe petting zoos. In Australia, mobile petting zoos are allowed in schools, child care centres and even shopping centres. For many children, a mobile petting zoo is their first opportunity to see and touch an animal. American mobile petting zoos have gained popularity in the southern states.

== Health effects ==
Touching animals can result in the transmission of diseases between animals and humans (zoonosis) so it is recommended that people should thoroughly wash their hands before and after touching the animals. There have been several outbreaks of E. coli etc. Another threat is salmonella specifically from chicks handled by children. Petting zoo attendees under the age of 5 are at a higher risk of contracting these diseases and they are a major target audience of these petting zoos.

== See also ==
- Cat café
- Pet rental
