= Purrington's Cat Lounge =

Cat cafe in Portland, Oregon, US

- Logo

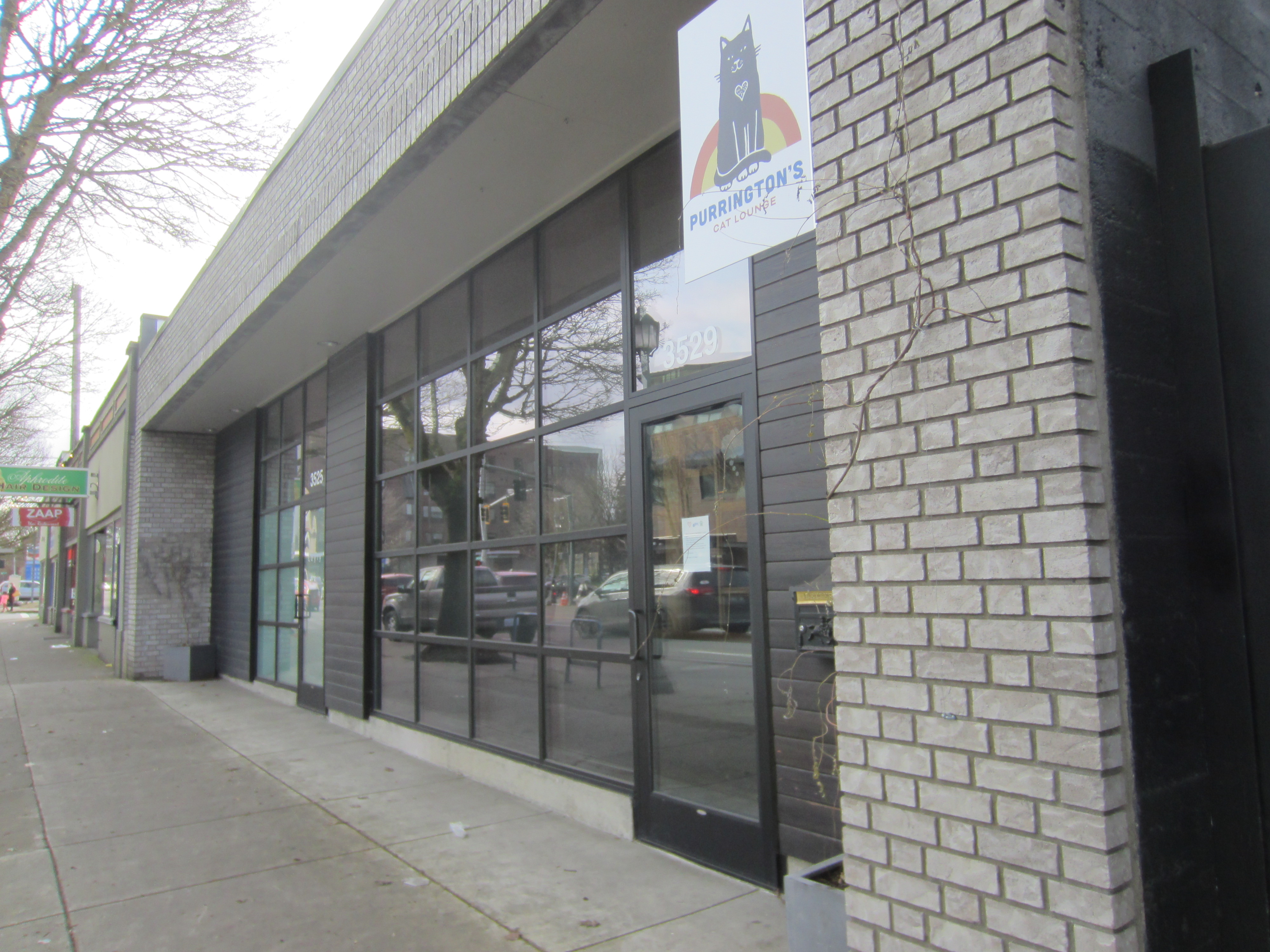
- The venue's exterior in 2021

- Location in Portland, Oregon
- Address: 3529 Northeast Martin Luther King Boulevard
- Location: Portland, Oregon, U.S.
- Coordinates: 45.54860°N 122.66184°W
- Owner: Kristen and Sergio Castillo (2015–2019); Garrett Simpson and Helen Harris (2019–2022)

Construction
- Opened: January 24, 2015
- Closed: 2022

Purrington's Cat Lounge (sometimes Purringtons Cat Lounge or simply Purringtons) was a cat café and shelter in Portland, Oregon, in the United States. The establishment billed itself as "the first cat cafe and adoption center in the Pacific Northwest". Purrington's was the first cat cafe in Oregon and among the first in North America.

== Description ==
Purrington's was a cat café and shelter. Large windows offered ample natural light, and the interior had an "exposed concrete and an industrial-chic vibe". The business served food as well as coffee, tea, beer, cider, and wine. According to USA Today, Purrington's was the first cat cafe to serve alcohol. The lounge accommodated 15 to 20 people per hour appointment. Military veterans and senior citizens received a discount.

== History ==
Purrington's opened on January 24, 2015, on Martin Luther King Jr. Boulevard in the northeast Portland part of the Boise neighborhood. More than 300 people attended its opening. The business was initially owned by Kristen and Sergio Castillo. Kristen was inspired to pursue the venture in October 2013, when she saw her friend share a video from Le Café des Chats in Paris. She quit her job to seek funding for the project.

Purrington's partnered with the Sherwood-based rescue organization Cat Adoption Team (CAT) to facilitate cat adoptions. Approximately 150 cats were adopted in the first year, and at least 600 cats were adopted between 2015 and 2018. The business also offered yoga classes.

The cafe was expected to close in November 2018. However, ownership transferred to Garrett Simpson and Helen Harris in January 2019. After being closed for nine months and undergoing a renovation, Purrington's reopened in early 2020. The business was burglarized in January 2020. Operations ceased temporarily in 2021, during the COVID-19 pandemic.

In September 2022, Simpson and Harris announced plans to close in November.

== Reception ==
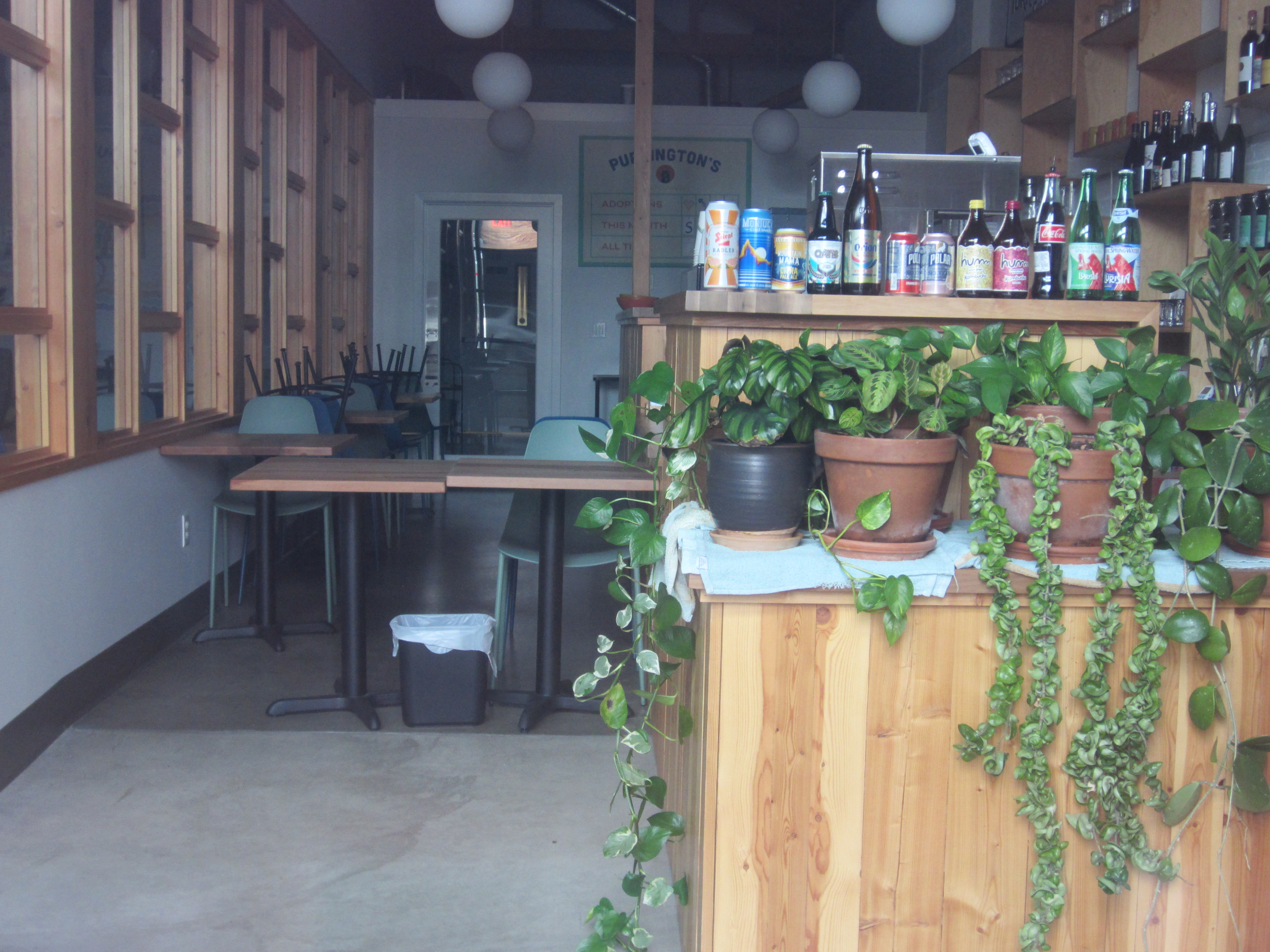
Interior during COVID-19 pandemic closure, 2021

Zachary Carlsen of Sprudge wrote in 2015, "I hope that when a cat cafe inevitably comes to a neighborhood near you, it is done with the degree of care, respect, and love evident at Purringtons." Jamie Ditaranto included Purrington's in USA Today's 2017 list of nine "cutest animal cafes around the world". In 2022, Emilee Lindner included Purrington's in Time Out's list of the "cutest cat cafes in the US for cuddles and coffee", and Janelle Leeson included the business in Yahoo!'s list of "15 Must-Visit Cat Cafés, and How They're Changing the Way We Adopt".

Janea Melido of The Beacon said Purrington's was "the best part about going to school in Portland". Willamette Week's Suzette Smith said the cafe had "surprisingly good snacks". Purrington's inspired the establishment of a similar cat cafe in Las Vegas.

== See also ==
- Cat fancy
- Catio Tour, an annual event in Portland
- Cats in the United States
- Human interaction with cats
- Pet adoption
