= National Cat Groomers Institute of America =

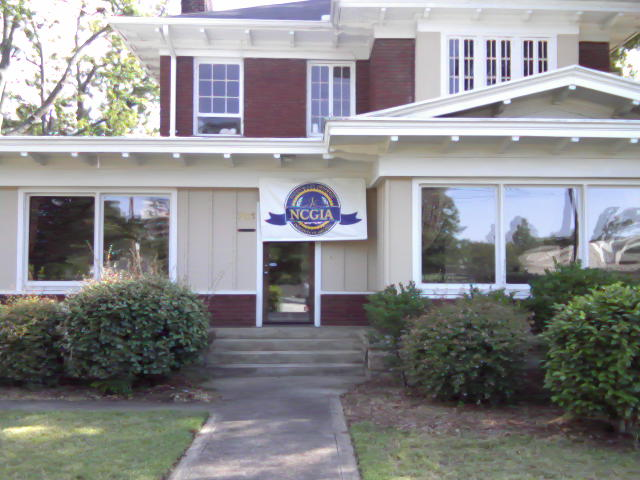
Headquarters of the National Cat Groomers Institute of America in Greenville, SC in 2010.

The National Cat Groomers Institute of America (NCGIA) is an American organization devoted to training and certifying people in the grooming of cats. Headquartered in Greer, South Carolina, it was founded in 2007 by Danelle German, the organization's current president.

== Purpose ==
Dog grooming courses have been offered at every school of that type. Most cats, though require additional grooming as a matter of cat health. This is especially important with domestic long-haired cats such as Maine Coons, Norwegian Forest Cats, Persians, and Siberians in terms of hairballs that these breeds may ingest and matting issues. In an effort to close this gap, the NCGIA was created in May 2007 by Danelle German, a Persian cat breeder who owned a cat grooming business in Simpsonville, South Carolina (southeast of Greenville) until late 2009.

== Certifications ==
NCGIA offers two certifications for cat groomers: Certified Feline Master Groomer (CFMG) and Certified Feline Creative Groomer (CFCG). As of 2010, there are three certified instructors. The courses are two weeks in length, and involve practical and written exams on grooming cats.

== Promotion ==
The NCGIA offers exhibits of their services at grooming trade shows both in the United States and worldwide.

== See also ==
- Cats in the United States
