= Crumbs and Whiskers =

American cat café operator

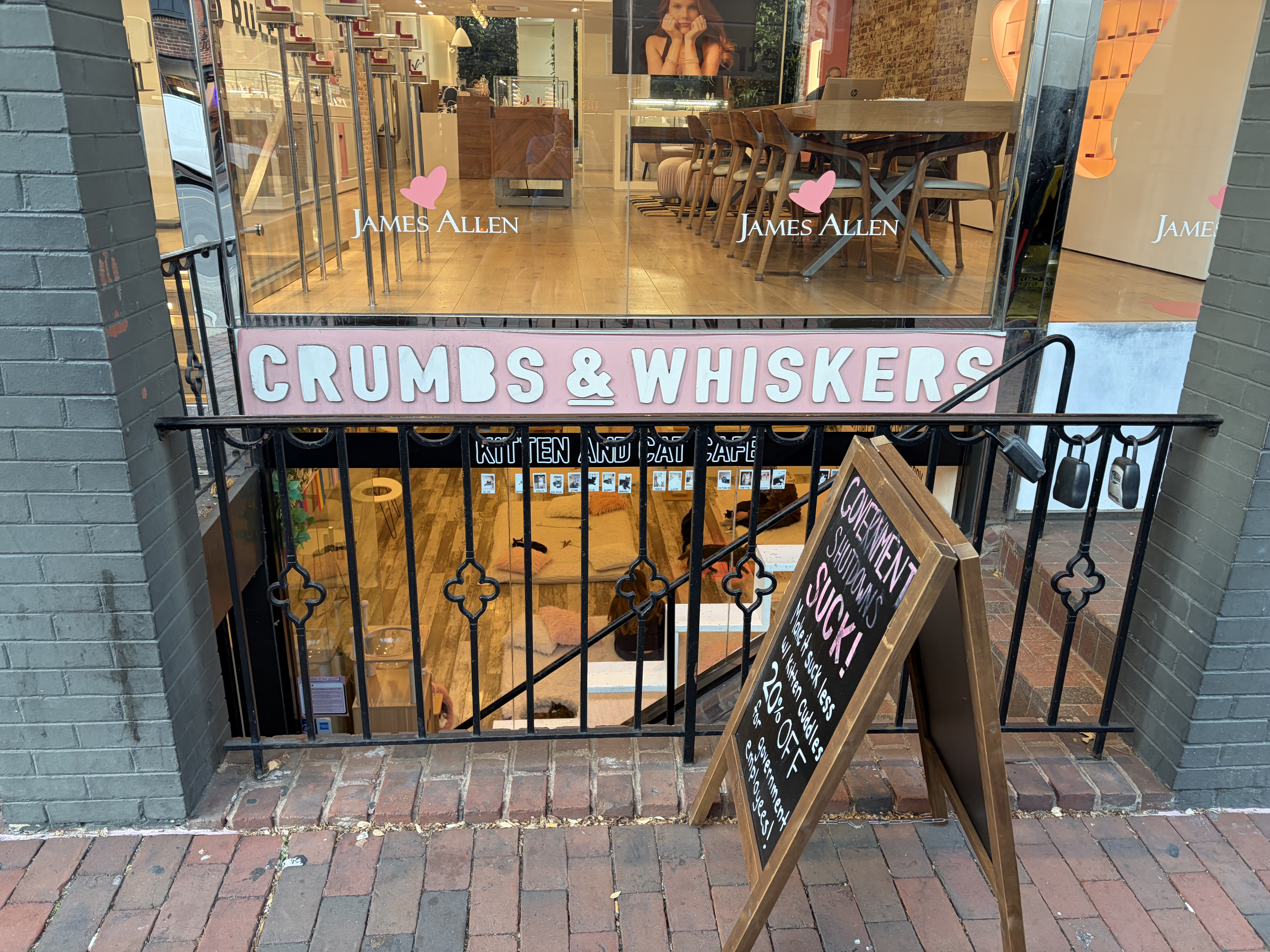
- Crumbs and Whiskers' Georgetown location
- Formation: June 20, 2015
- Founder: Kanchan Singh
- Type: Cat café
- Location(s): • 3211 M St NW, Washington, D.C. 20007 • 7924 Melrose Ave, Los Angeles, CA 90048
- Region served: Washington metropolitan area Los Angeles metropolitan area
- Products: Coffee • Tea • Cookies
- Services: Cat interaction • Cat adoption
- Owner: Kanchan Singh (Co-owner); Chetan Singh (Co-owner)
- Affiliations: • Homeward Trails Animal Rescue • Stray Cat Alliance
- Website: www.crumbsandwhiskers.com
- Remarks: Financed via Kickstarter: Link

Crumbs and Whiskers is a cat café that foster rescue cats and offer cafe amenities in Washington, D.C., and Los Angeles, California. Crumbs & Whiskers partners with rescues who save cats at risk of euthanasia in high kill shelters and cats facing homelessness on the streets.

Crumbs and Whiskers opened its first cat café in Washington on June 20, 2015; this was the first cat café to open in the Washington metropolitan area. The Washington, D.C., café is partnered with Homeward Trails Animal Rescue, and provides a living space for around 20 to 25 cats at a time. Through the partnership arrangement, the Homeward Trails provides vaccinated and vetted cats to Crumbs and Whiskers, which functions as a foster home for the cats until they are adopted.

The Los Angeles café opened on September 30, 2016, and was the first cat café to open in the Los Angeles metropolitan area. The Los Angeles café is partnered with Stray Cat Alliance, a Los Angeles–based animal rescue which provides cats for the café. Similar to the Washington, D.C., café, the Los Angeles café offers a living space for the cats until they are adopted.

Crumbs and Whiskers uses an online booking system for scheduling visits and offers a fixed admission price per visit.

In January 2026, employees at the Washington location began petitioning for a union alleging unsafe working conditions, low wages, and inadequate cat medical care. The location closed in February 2026 amidst allegations by staff of union busting by ownership but reopened in March 2026 after employees successfully unionized.

== Startup funding ==
The business founder, Kanchan Singh, opted to finance the venture by crowdfunding through a Kickstarter project with a US$15,000 target, an amount which she was initially uncertain that she could raise. The Crumbs and Whiskers Kickstarter project reached its funding target less than a day after it launched, and doubled this amount prior to the project deadline. The campaign ended with 705 backers and raised a total of $35,881 for the café.
