= Koneko =

Cat cafe in New York City

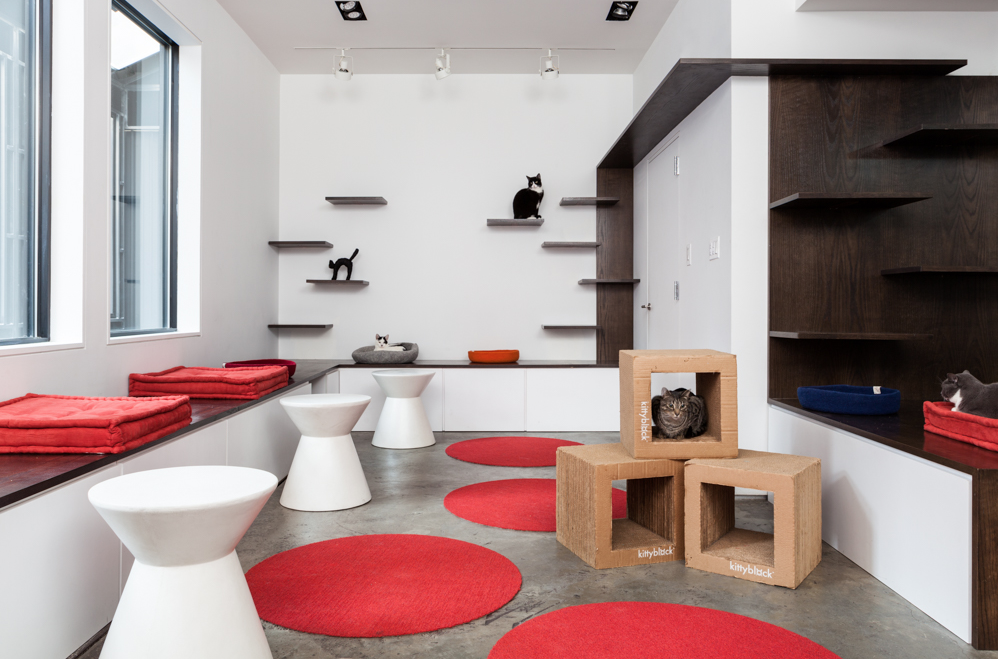
Koneko's cattery

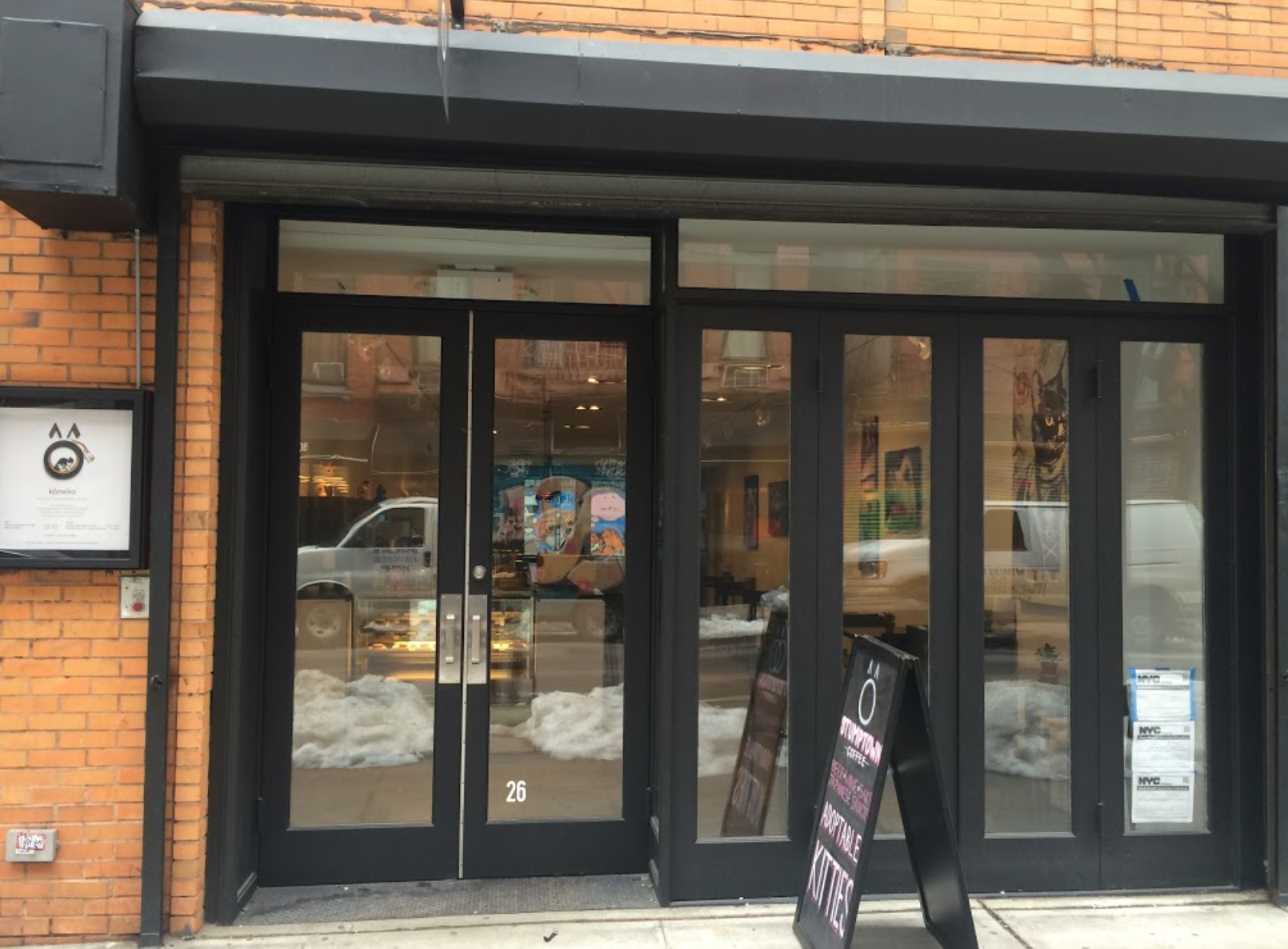
Koneko's exterior

Koneko ("kitten" in Japanese) is a cat cafe located on the Lower East Side of Manhattan. The cafe's format is based on Japanese cat cafes. Koneko is partnered with Anjellicle Cats Rescue, a non-profit rescue organization based in New York City that specializes in pulling cats from the city's euthanasia shelters. All of the cats at Koneko are adoptable.

Koneko was founded by Benjamin Kalb, a chef who worked previously at Bouley and Momofuku Noodle Bar.
