= Animal cafe =

Café where customers can interact with animals

An animal café, also known as a pet café, is a type of café where visitors can see and interact with various animals such as cats, dogs, rabbits, owls, or sheep while they enjoy food and drinks. The first known animal café in the world was a cat café established in 1998 in Taiwan. Since then, a number of cafés for various animals have been established globally and become increasingly popular.

== History ==
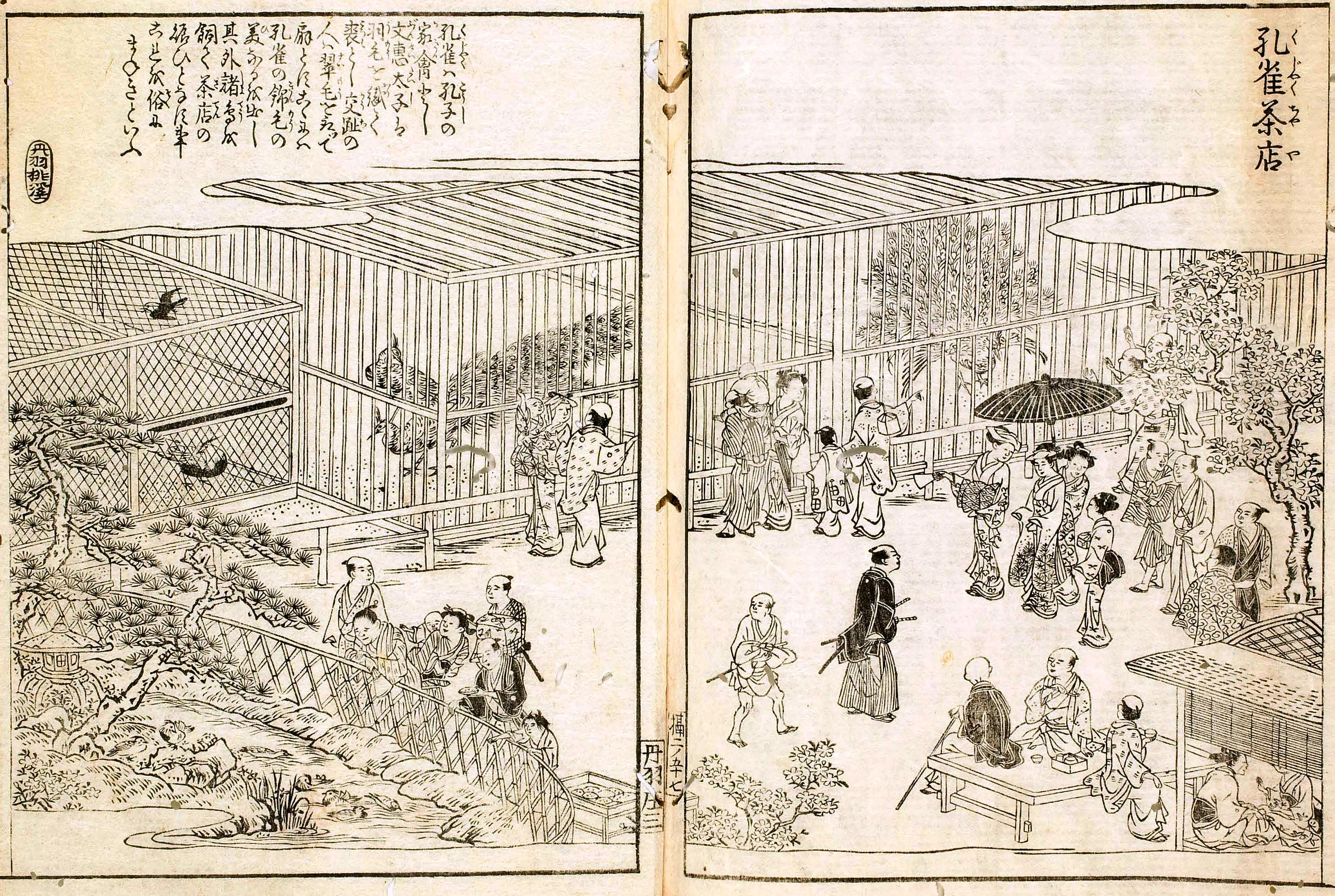
A peacock tea house in Japan in the 18th century, from the "Settsu meisho zue" (Illustrated Guide to Famous Places in Settsu Province)

Taiwan created the very first animal café in 1998 which was a cat café. Thereafter, animal cafés were created in Japan before spreading to the rest of the world. A Japanese tourist visited Taiwan and discovered the potential of the idea before coming back to Japan to establish the first animal café in Osaka in 2004, where the concept flourished. Today animal cafés are found across Europe and America yet they are still more popular in Asian countries and Japan is known as the country with the most animal cafés in the world. Originally the cafés were created for people who enjoy the company of animals however there are now many animal cafés for abandoned or lost animals as well. Such animal cafés are used as a way to help these abandoned or lost animals by providing them not only home and food but also the opportunity to be adopted by customers of the café.

== Types ==
As individuals prefer many different animals, there are many different types of animal cafés in the world.

=== Cat café ===
Vice President of Taiwan Hsiao Bi-khim at a cat cafe

Cat cafés are one of the most common animal cafés, perhaps due to the popularity of cats as pets. A number of different types of cats can be found at cat cafés. Sometimes cats are allowed in all public areas of the café, but in other cases, there is a separate play area where people can play with the cats.

Some cat cafés have cats which are available for adoption, such as those which were strays.

=== Dog café ===
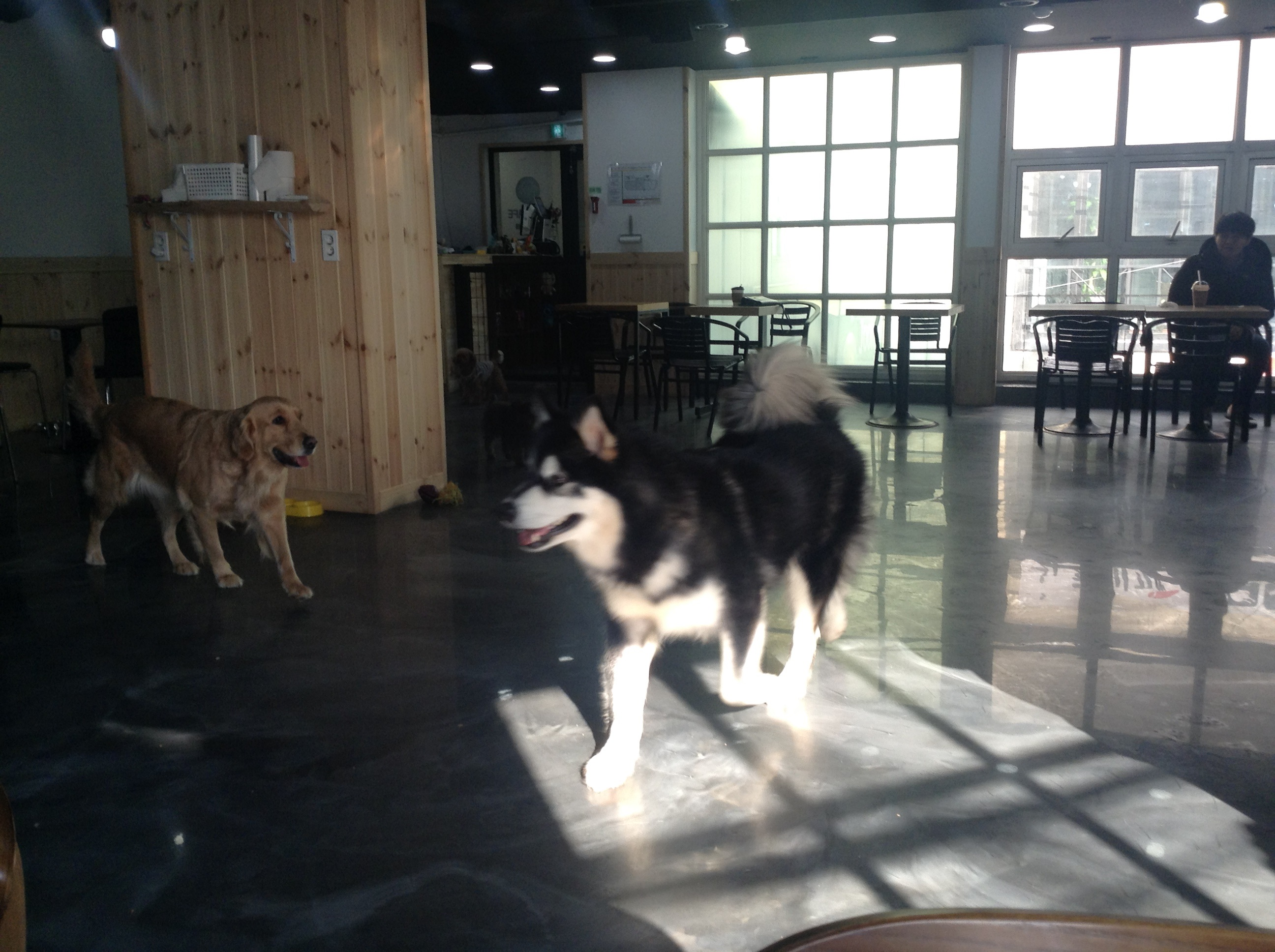
Dogs at a cafe in South Korea

A dog café is another very common animal café. A dog café is more active, noisy, and filled with motion compared to a cat café due to the typical behaviour of dogs.

Like a cat café, a dog café also provides an adoption system to customers who have the ability to raise them. The dog café can be seen as a sanctuary providing a good experience for customers to make a connection with abandoned dogs, and possibly adopt them and provide a long-term caring home.

There is a dog café in Los Angeles, USA that has the goal of finding a home for shelter dogs. Customers spend time with said dogs and are given the opportunity to adopt them.

=== Raccoon café ===
A more unusual form of animal café is the raccoon café. There is a raccoon café in South Korea in which people can play with raccoons while they drink and eat the food. Because this café is divided into two rooms, people can choose to play with a raccoon or just enjoy their food and drinks. Because raccoons have sharp claws and teeth, there is a warning that the café is not responsible for any damage from raccoons.

=== Hedgehog café ===
In 2016, a hedgehog café was opened in Tokyo for the first time in the world. Because of the unique concept, many foreigners have visited the café. At the same time, some people have criticized this café from a viewpoint of animal protection.

=== Sheep café ===
The first sheep café in the world opened in South Korea, initially featuring two sheep named Sugar and Honey. Customers may feed and interact with the sheep as they enjoy their food. However, the sheep do not stay at the café during the summer season due to weather issues.

=== Rabbit café ===
The first rabbit café in North America, The Bunny Cafe, is located in Vancouver, Canada, opened in 2021. The rabbits at Vancouver’s Bunny Cafe come from Rabbitats Rescue Society, a nonprofit organization that rescues abandoned and feral rabbits in the Metro Vancouver area. The rabbits at The Bunny Cafe are free-roaming within fenced areas in the Bunny Lounge, and may be fed by, interacted with, and adopted by customers (after an adoption screening and fee). Customers also have access to rabbit grooming services, including nail trimming, brushing, and scent gland cleaning, as well as rabbit-related care products and merchandise. All earnings of The Bunny Cafe are split evenly with Rabbitats Rescue Society to support their work.

A rabbit café is located in Japan. Most rabbits at this rabbit café are not wandering around, often being kept in their cages. However, this café sometimes provides a chance to walk around a nearby place with the rabbits. A rabbit café by the name of "Bunny Café" also exists in Kraków, Poland.

=== Bird café ===
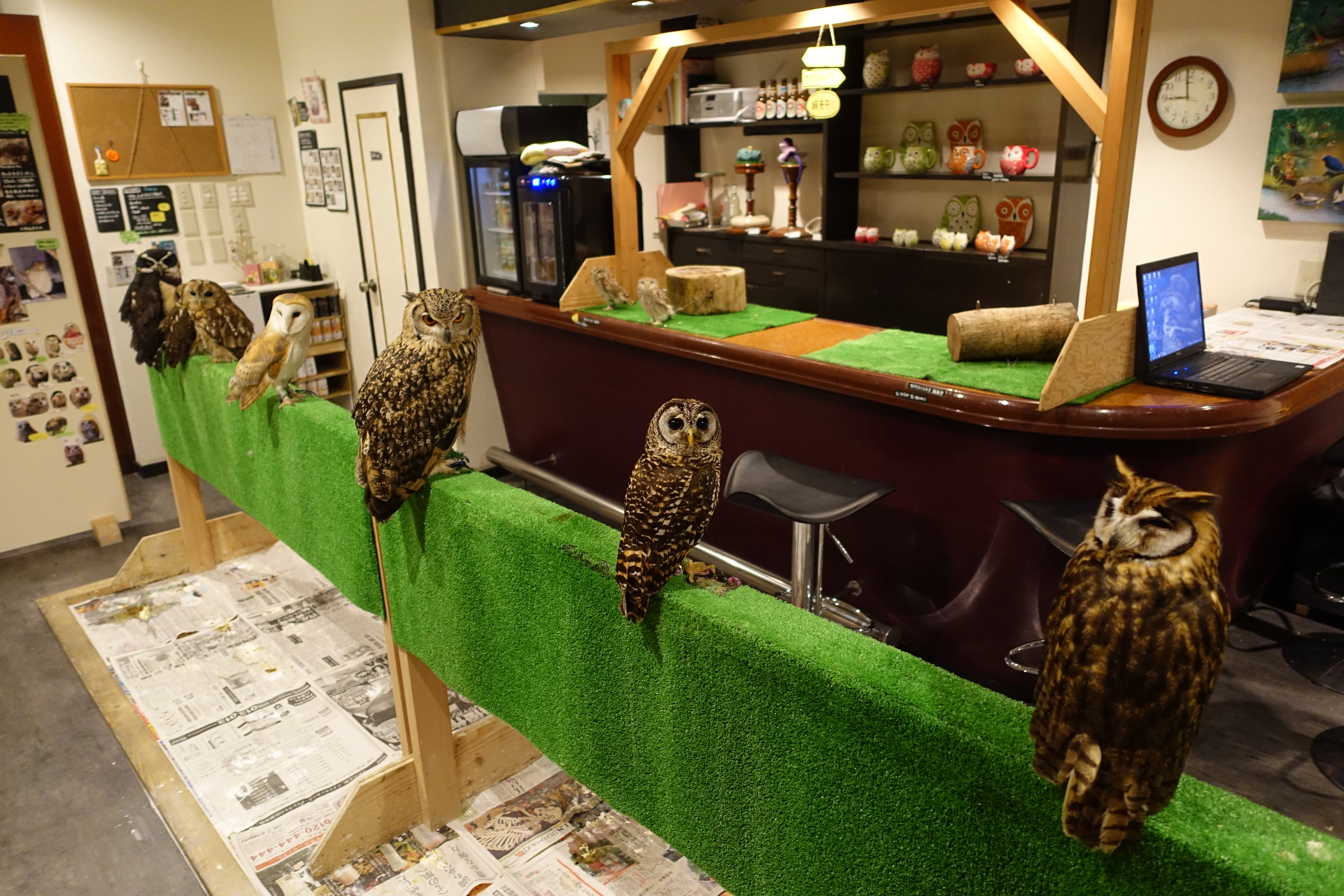
Various kinds of owls at a cafés

There are a few different kinds of bird cafés in Japan, such as those for owls, parrots, falcons, and hawks. They are not dangerous and do not attack people because they have been trained well by staff. The staff show customers the way to handle and feed the birds in a safe way. Customers can take pictures with the birds with permission from staff.

=== Reptile café ===
In Cambodia, there is a famous reptile café in which people can see a number of different species of reptiles and arachnids such as turtles, snakes, iguanas, and spiders. People can relax, eat, drink, learn about, and take pictures with a number of different species of animals at the café. The owner opened this café in 2018 with permission from Cambodia's Ministry of Forestry, Fisheries and Agriculture. He regards animal welfare as the primary concern of the café.

=== Capybara café ===
In 2020, Capyneko Café was opened in Kichijōji, Tokyo, Japan, serving as both a capybara and cat café. Currently, two capybara cafés exist in Japan, Capyneko Café and Capy Café, both of which are located in Tokyo. Outside of Japan, a capybara café was opened in St. Augustine, Florida, USA in 2024. Due to capybaras being semiaquatic mammals, concerns have arisen over their welfare.

== Controversy ==
There are several arguments objecting to animal cafés, mostly from a viewpoint of animal protection.

- Some animal experts say that animal cafés might provide some positive effects to animals, but they are more likely to encourage people to buy animals than pay attention to animal welfare.
- Some people argue that the way the animal cafés operate their business is very harmful to animal safety because some animals are not quite suited for the lifestyle at the café.
- Some visitors of animal cafés in Japan express their concerns for the safety and welfare of the birds.
- Japanese animal rights activists also argue that bird cafés abuse birds for the entertainment of humans. As a result, the Japanese government passed a much stricter Animal Protection Law which strengthens the new rules and restricts trading hours of animal cafés. The stricter regulations are intended to make sure that those animals at the cafés have appropriate human treatment and care.

There are also cases of crimes against animal welfare in animal cafés. The owner of a cat café in Thailand was arrested by police due to disobedience against the Animal Protection Law. Seven cats died at his café due to poor safety care. Also, such welfare and safety problem can be found in South Korea as well. For example, animals in the cafés were not allowed to sleep until the cafés shut the door late at night. Such animal safety problems are generated due to the absence of regulations on animal cafés in South Korea because animal cafés are a relatively recent phenomenon.

There have also been cases in which customers who were injured by animals at the café complained about the café's safety policy. These cases occurred when the café owners did not take any responsibility for injuries.

== See also ==
- Coffeeshop
- Animal welfare
- Animal protectionism
