= Danelle German =

American businesswoman and author

Danelle German is an American businesswoman and author who is known for her creation of handbags made from cat and dog hair. She later founded the National Cat Groomers Institute of America (NCGIA) located in Greer, South Carolina.

== Cat breeder ==
From 1999 to 2005, German bred Persian cats for Cat Fanciers' Association (CFA) shows, earning several regional awards for her cats, completing her show career in 2005 with a third place premiership (spayed or neutered cats over eight months old) for her cat, GC, GP, NW Chantilylace Groucho Marks of Bara, DM. In preparation for the CFA shows, German and her husband had built a cattery and grooming operation for her Persians in their home. At the request of The Cat Clinic of Greenville (South Carolina), German opened her doors to the public in January 2001 to create The Catty Shack.

== The Catty Shack ==
By 2003, the business was so successful, that German moved The Catty Shack to neighboring Simpsonville (located southeast of Greenville). German sold her business to Morgan Reynolds in December 2009 to focus on the NCGIA in Greenville which she founded in May 2007.

While at The Catty Shack, German started a side business creating handbags and tote-bags, crafted from cat hair shed at her South Carolina grooming-parlor on a daily basis. This project eventually led to the birth of Catty Shack Creations, a handbag business highlighted during the "Persian Cats" segment on Animal Planet's Cats 101 in December 2008.

== National Cat Groomers Institute of America ==
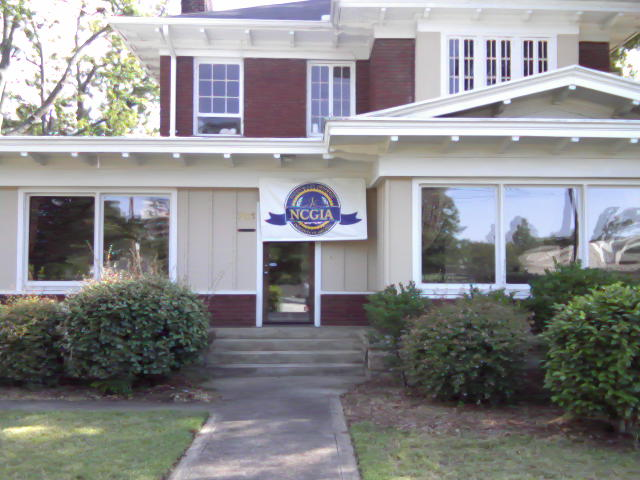
The National Cat Groomers Institute of America in Greenville which German founded in 2007.

Prior to the NCGIA's founding in 2006, German had presented seminars regarding cat grooming. By late 2006, German realized the need to train people to properly groom a cat. This was evident in the amount of phone calls and e-mails received from frustrated groomers and disappointed cat owners alike. This resulted in German creating the NCGIA, the first feline-specific grooming instruction of its kind to be formed. Since the NCGIA's formation in 2007, German has also been a sought-after speaker, innovator and entrepreneur within the pet care industry. In her talks, she leads people into self-awareness and self-actualization, inspires them to find and pursue their own excellence, motivates humans to reach deeper within themselves as they learn to communicate with another species on a profound level. She espouses several simple truths along the way: never trust a cat; failure is not an option; every cat deserves the best groom and groomer.

German is also the author of The Ultimate Cat Groomer Encyclopedia. This encyclopedia focuses on the cat grooming business, CFA-approved cat breeds, feline behavior, grooming and handling techniques, feline health, and case studies on cat grooming. The NCGIA relocated to Greer (Between Greenville and Spartanburg) in the late 2010s.

== Personal ==
German is married with five children. Her oldest daughter, Olivia, works at the NCGIA. With her husband, German developed the patented CattyShack Vac drying system which is used to dry a cat once they are washed, and Chubbs Bars, a degreasing shampoo for pets.
