= Cat enclosure =

Structure for confining cats

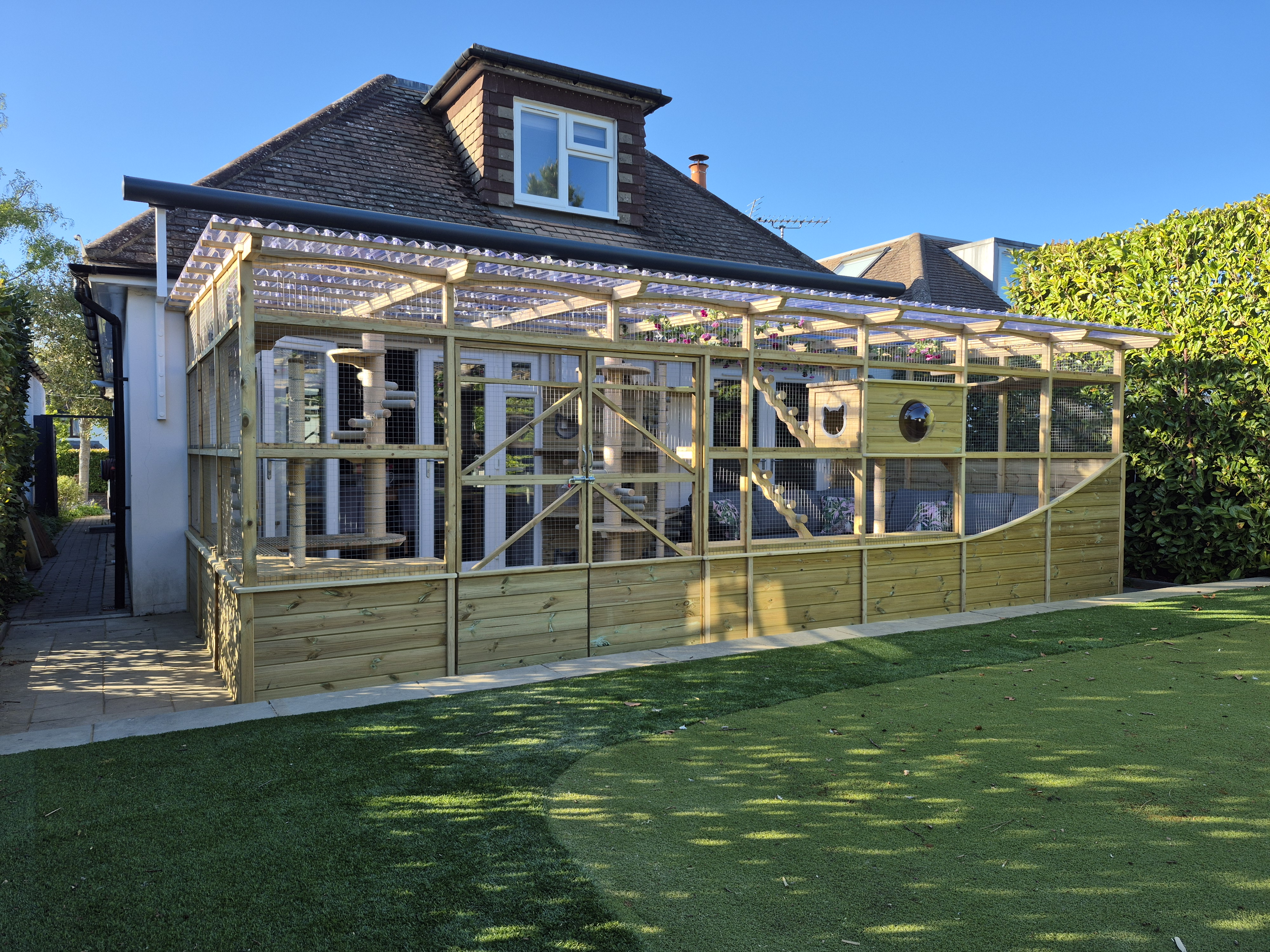
A bespoke catio with multilevel play area by Catio King

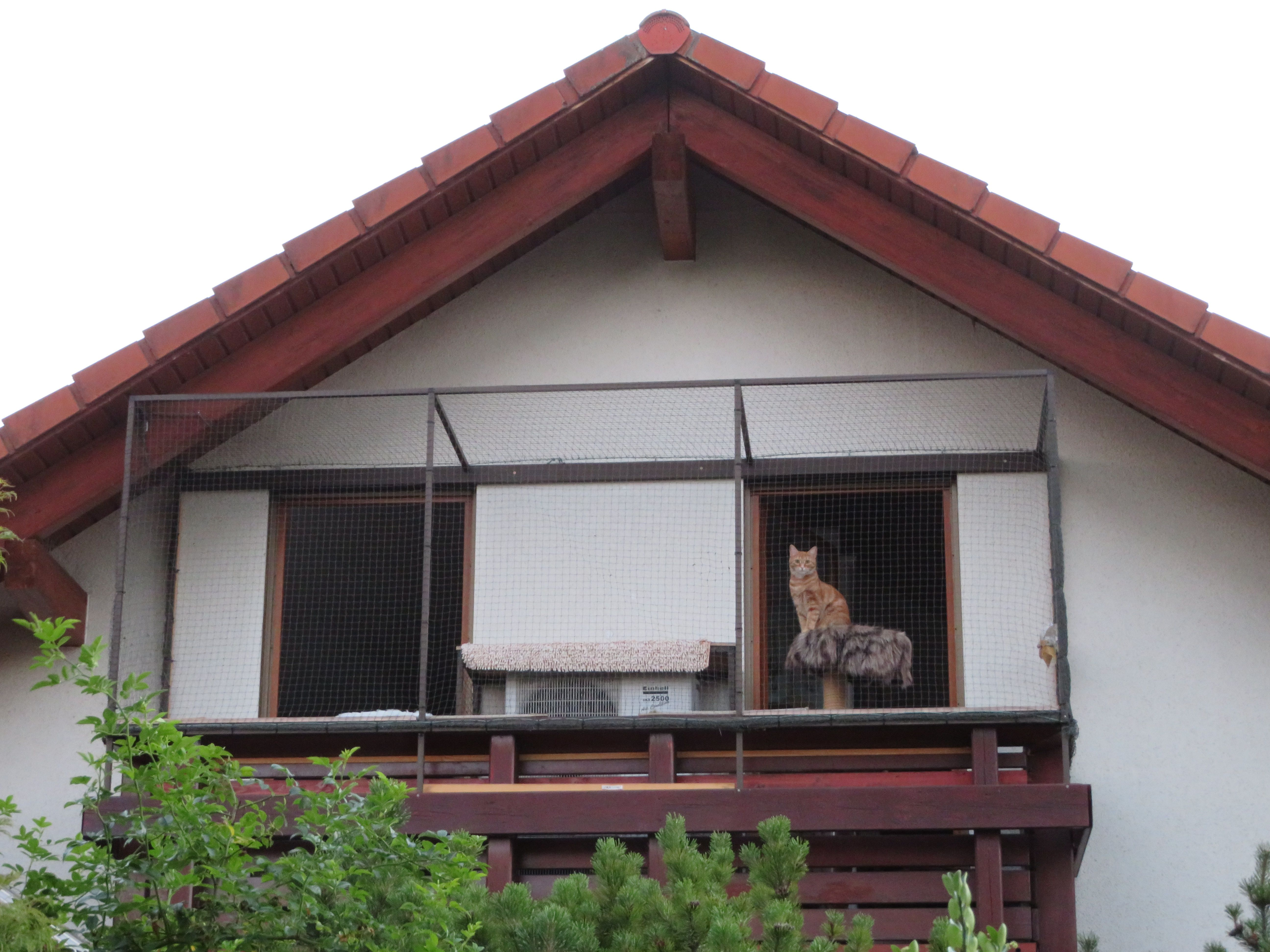
Balcony-style catio

A cat enclosure, cat cage, cat run, catservatory or catio, a portmanteau of cat and patio, is a permanent or a temporary structure intended to confine a cat or multiple cats to a designated space for the cat to experience the outside. Some cat enclosures have a secondary function of ensuring the cat's safety by keeping other animals out, such as predators of cats (coyotes, wolves, etc.) or the safety of other smaller animals like cat prey (birds, mice, etc.). Enclosures may be constructed in either an indoor or an outdoor environment. Similar to patio, the term catio is specifically used for enclosures, which are adjoining a residence or other structure.

When a cat enclosure is constructed outdoors, it is used to prevent cats from wandering off where they may become lost, endangered by cars, or eaten by predators. Cat enclosures may also be constructed outdoors in order to provide a predominantly indoor cat a means of exploration and outdoor enrichment, while maintaining their safety. Domestic cat breeders may use indoor cat enclosures to separate animals or encourage selective breeding. One specific situation where a cat enclosure is particularly useful is when a cat is moved from one house to another. Cats have an instinctive drive to return home, often called a 'homing instinct', which is normally beneficial, but can endanger the cat immediately after a move if the distance between homes is significant. Placing a cat in an outdoor enclosure when it reaches its new home may prevent the cat from attempting to perform this instinctive behavior.

Most domestic cat enclosures are constructed of a metal or wood frame with a steel wire mesh. Considering that cats are excellent jumpers and climbers, most enclosures also feature some type of roof structure to prevent cats from escaping. An enclosure may or may not have an integral floor. For those enclosures that do not have an additional floor, the existing surface where the enclosure is constructed serves as the floor.

Cat enclosures may be home-built or may be acquired from commercial suppliers. Enclosures purchased from commercial suppliers may feature a modular design that allows for some customization, or might only be offered in standard shapes and sizes.

Ideally, a cat enclosure should be tailored to the cat's needs, considering its breed, personality, behavior tendencies, and age. Some essential factors to consider are access to sunny areas, shelter from harsh weather (including rain, wind, and excessive heat), a sleeping compartment and exercise area, a litter tray, and regular worming and vaccinations as recommended by the veterinarian.

== See also ==
- Birdcage
- Cage
- Catio Tour, annual event in Portland, Oregon, U.S.
