= Cat café =

Themed café

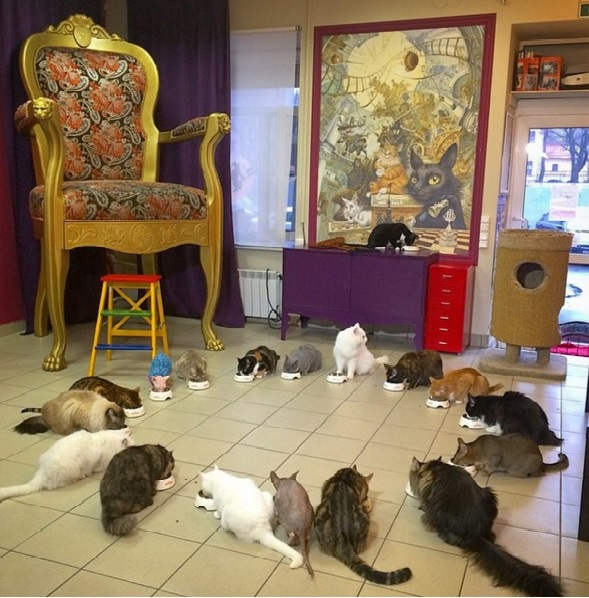
Cat café "Cats Republic" in Saint Petersburg, Russia

A cat café is a theme café, whose attractions are cats that can be watched and played with. Patrons pay a cover fee, generally hourly, and thus cat cafés can be seen as a form of supervised indoor pet rental.

== History ==
The world's first cat café, "Cat Flower Garden" (Chinese: 貓花園), opened in Taipei, Taiwan, in 1998 and eventually became a global tourist destination. The concept spread to Japan, where the first one named "Neko no Jikan" (lit. "Cat's Time") was opened in Osaka in 2004. Due to Japan's land size and population, many residents live in small apartments or condominiums which do not allow pets, making cat cafés a very popular destination for young workers looking for the companionship and comfort offered. Tokyo's first cat café, named "Neko no Mise" (Cat's Store), opened in 2005. After this, the popularity of cat cafés boomed in Japan. As of 2026, Japan’s cat cafes number over 300.

Cat cafés originally opened in Asia: Singapore, Malaysia, Indonesia, Japan, Korea, and mainland China. However, since the 2010s, cat cafes gained in popularity in many countries worldwide, for example in Belgium, France, Germany, the Netherlands, United Arab Emirates, United Kingdom, and United States.

"Cat café" was added to the online edition of the Oxford Dictionary of English in August 2015.

== Asia ==
=== Japan ===
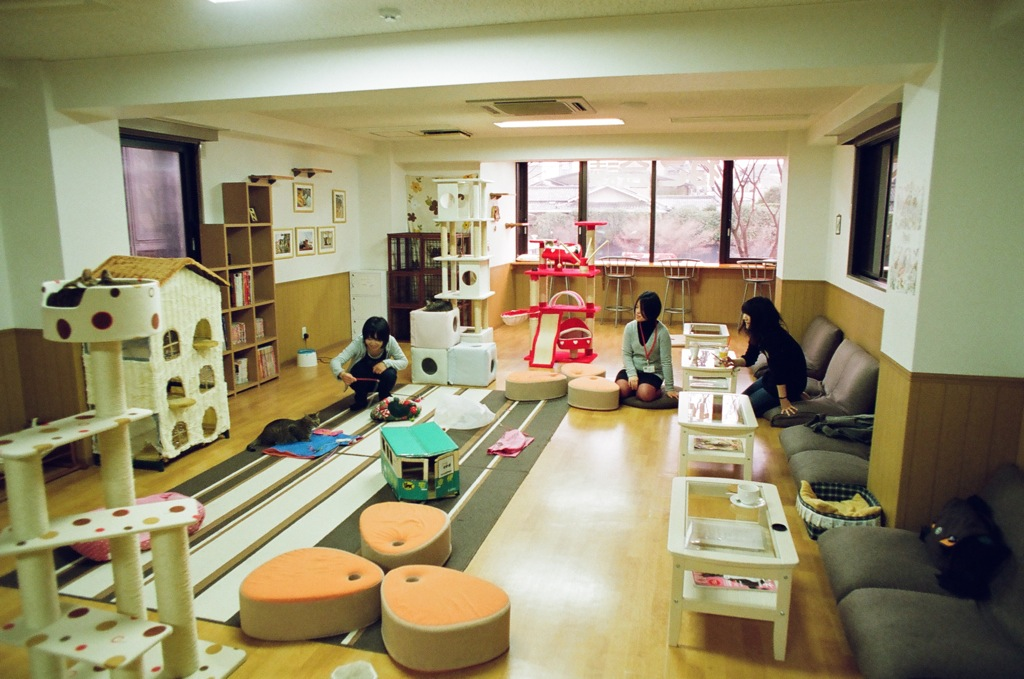
Nekokaigi, a small cat café in Kyoto.

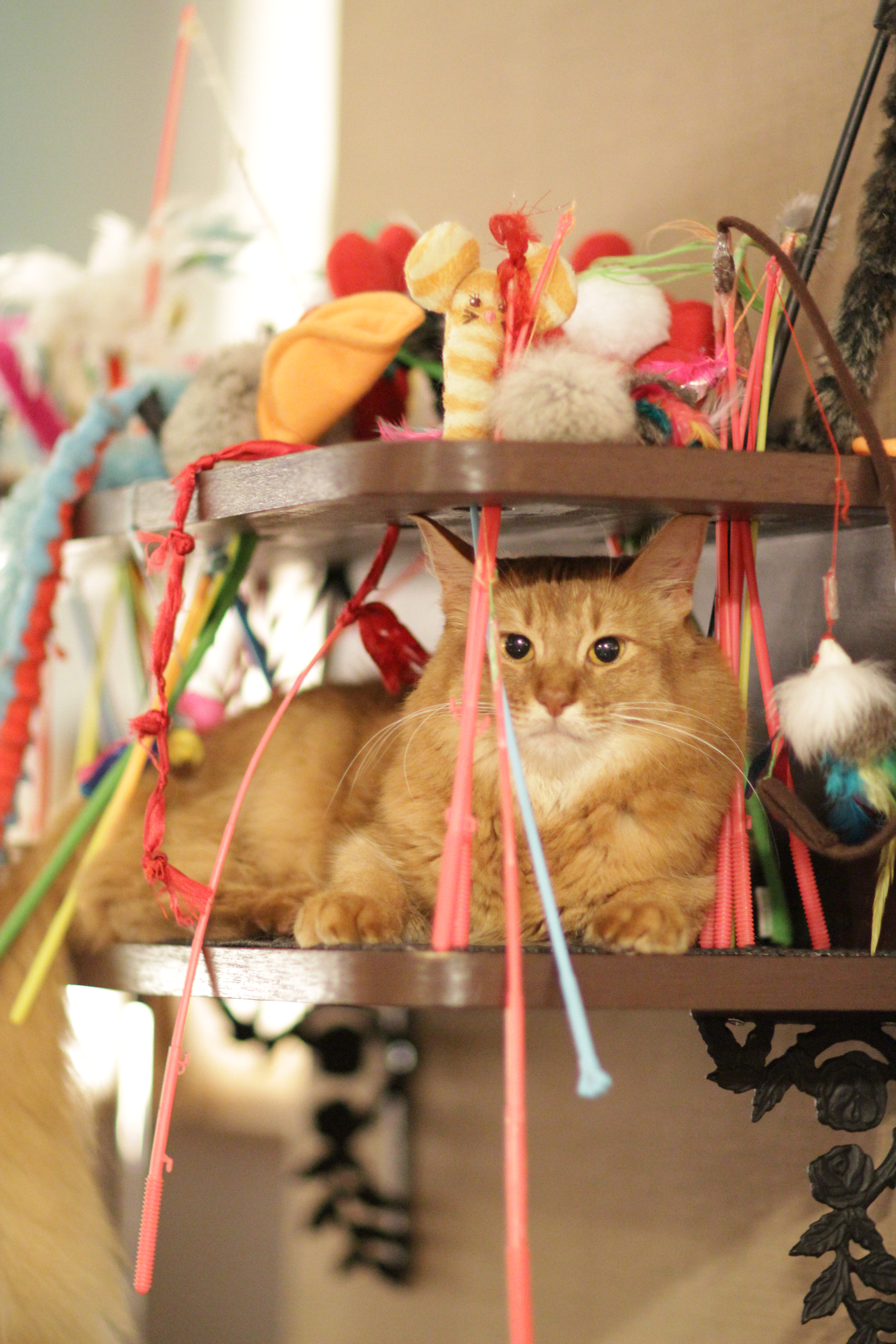
Female Somali cat in a cat café in Tokyo.

Cat cafés are quite popular in Japan, with Tokyo being home to 58 cat cafés as of 2015. The first was Cat's Store (猫の店, Neko no Mise), by Norimasa Hanada, which opened in 2005. The popularity of cat cafés in Japan is attributed to many apartments forbidding pets, and to cats providing relaxing companionship in what may otherwise be a stressful and lonesome urban life. Other forms of pet rental, such as rabbit cafés, are also common in Japan.

There are various types of cat cafés in Japan. Some feature specific categories of cat, such as black cats, fat cats, rare or popular breeds of cats or ex-stray cats. Cat cafés in Japan are required to obtain a license and comply with the nation's Animal Treatment and Protection Law.

Japanese cat cafés feature strict rules to ensure cleanliness and animal welfare, in particular seeking to ensure that the cats are not disturbed by excessive and unwanted attention, such as by young children or when sleeping. Many cat cafés also seek to raise awareness of cat welfare issues, such as abandoned and stray cats. Many cafes often 'employ' cats from local animal shelters to help them become accustomed to humans, as well as advertise them for possible adoption. From 2012 the cats could be displayed until 8 pm, but in 2016 the guidelines of the environment ministry state that they may visit and play with customers until 10 pm.

One café in Tokyo added goats as a way of having a unique element.

=== Malaysia ===
Malaysia has also seen a rise in the cat and pet cafe trend since 2015 and many have popped up in cities across the country. Generally, different states have different laws, standards, permits and restrictions for cafes with animals. The Animal Welfare Act requires a licence for those having animals for a living to prevent animal cruelty but enforcement has been weak.

In 2017, in Penang, where animal cafes are extremely popular, a new ruling required animal cafes to have separate rooms for guests to dine and handle the pets.

Meanwhile in 2024, the unanimous passing of the Protection of Public Health (Amendment) Bill 2024 by the Sarawak Legislative Assembly meant that animals are not allowed in food premises in Sarawak, including cat cafes which affected cat cafe owners there.

=== Palestine ===
The Meow Cat Cafe opened in August 2023 in Gaza's Tel al-Hawa neighbourhood. Owned and run by Naeema Mabed, it was the first cat cafe in Gaza. With most people in the strip living in poverty, the cafe was considered a luxury. The Gaza war led to the cafe's closure.

=== Singapore ===
The first cat café in Singapore is Cat Café Neko no Niwa (Japanese for 'Cat Garden'). There are at least five cat cafés in the city.

The Singaporean Cat cafés are regulated and licensed by Agri-Food and Veterinary Authority of Singapore (AVA) and they are all bound to a 'code of conduct'. Individuals having questions with their cat needs can join the Cat Welfare Society, which helps with medical fees and sterilization costs or adopting of the cats. Cat cafés usually have their own specific house rules.

Cuddles Cat Cafe was investigated by AVA in December 2014.

=== South Korea ===
South Korea has several cat cafés mostly in Seoul. Cat cafés in South Korea have been very successful among both residents and tourists in South Korea. Customers can adopt a cat at the cat cafés.

=== Taiwan ===
Cats are popular pets in Taiwan, with the cat population increasing rapidly in recent years. The world's first cat café, named "Cat Flower Garden" was opened in Taipei in 1998, where there is also a luxurious "Cathy Hotel" especially for cats. The Taiwanese cat café concept then spread to Japan, and later to most other countries around the world.

=== Thailand ===
Thailand has several cat cafés, mostly in Bangkok, such as Cat Cafe by Dome, Cat Up Cafe, and Purr Cat Cafe Club, which were all located in Bangkok. Each serves baked goods with a small menu of main dishes and coffee and tea. Many have special pricing for petting time with a specific cat. Prices are usually a little higher than at most cafés. They all have rules regarding the behaviour of guests towards the cats and often have purebred cats.

=== United Arab Emirates ===
There is a cat cafe in Umm Suqeim, Dubai. It was opened in 2018 by a local businesswoman.

== Europe ==
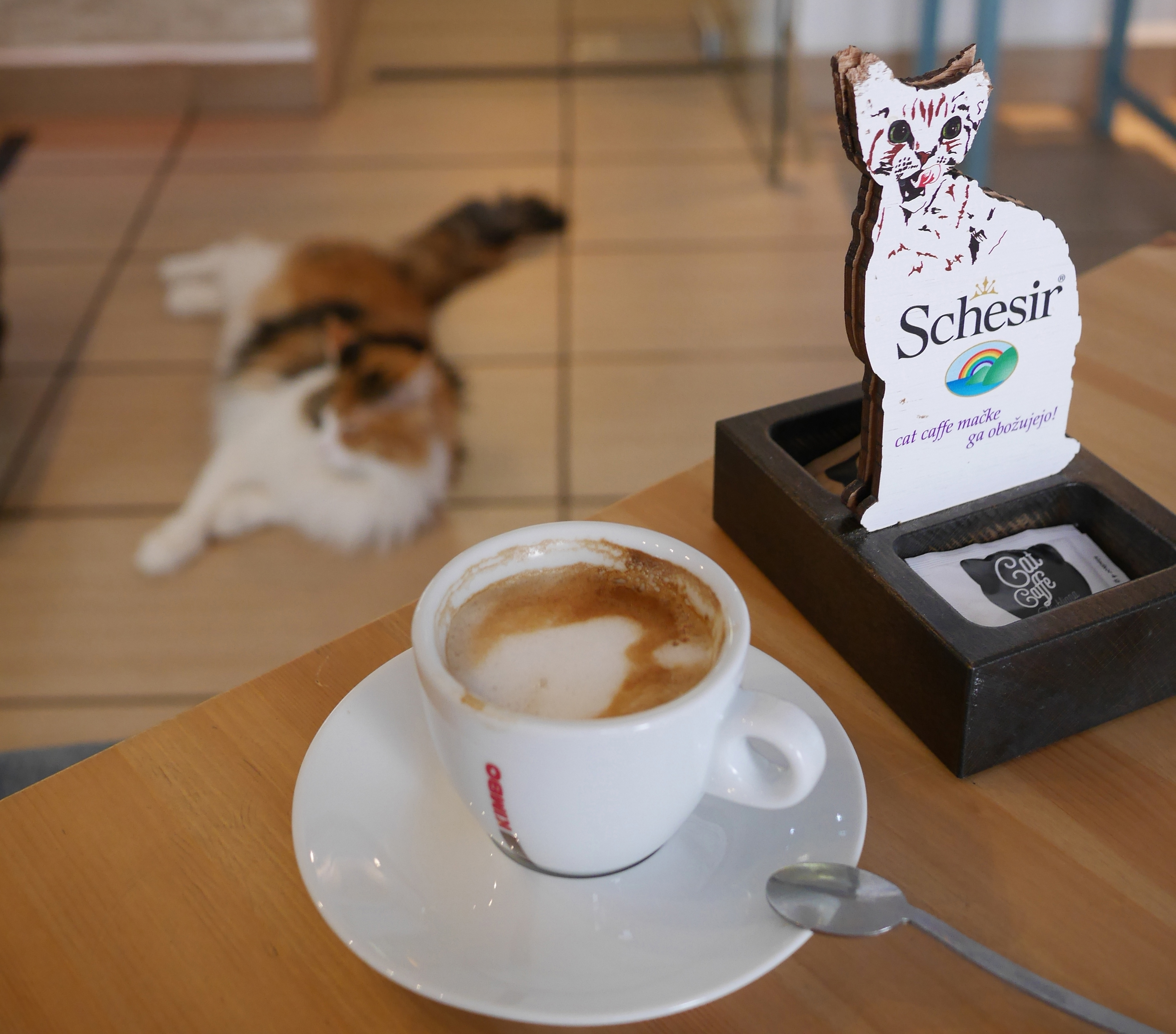
Cat cafe in Ljubljana, Slovenia.

=== Austria ===
In 2012, cat café Neko was opened in Vienna, and reopened as Nekopoint in 2023, as did a second cat cafe called BaristaCats.

=== Belgium ===
Le Chat Touille was opened up in Brussels in 2014, followed by DreamCATchers which opened in Ghent in 2017. The cats were rescued from shelters and rehabilitated, if necessary, with the aid of volunteers and a cat behavioural therapist. Customers can adopt these cats. It runs on donations and money customers spend in the café or on other products.

=== Germany ===
The first cat cafe in Germany, Katzentempel, opened in Munich in 2013 and as of 2025 it has locations in 16 German cities. Berlin's first cat cafe Pee Pee Katzencafe opened in 2013. Zur Mieze, which also includes music performances, opened in Berlin in 2015. The cafe Baristacats in Berlin was open from 2016 to the end of 2018. In Bielefeld, the cat cafe Miezhaus opened in 2017.

=== Greece ===
The first cat café in Greece, Cat Cafe Athens, opened in Athens in October 2023. The café works in partnership with the Ilioupolis Animal Welfare Union and all cats are up for adoption.

=== Italy ===
The first Italian cat café was opened in Turin in March 2014; at first it hosted six cats. Its name was MiaGola Café, which in Italian can be interpreted as a language game: literally mia gola can be translated my gluttony, while miagola (stressed on the first syllable: miàgola) means (he or she) meows. The café was shut down in February 2021 in response to the financial crisis that followed the COVID-19 pandemic. The cats were given up for adoption.

The Neko Cat Cafe was opened in Turin on 5 April 2014. The resident cats were all adopted from animal welfare organisations. The café has since shut down.

=== Lithuania ===
The cat café in Lithuania kačių kavinė opened in Vilnius in October 2014. It is one of the biggest cafes with cats in the world; 15 cats lived there in 2014.

=== Netherlands ===
The cat café Kopjes was opened in Amsterdam in April 2015. In Groningen Kattencafé Op z'n Kop opened in February 2016 and cat café Poeslief opened in October 2016. The cat café Miespoes opened in Den Bosch in 2016, as did cat café Katdeau in Hengelo. In August 2016 kattencafé Ditjes & Katjes opened in The Hague. Shortly afterwards Pebbles opened its doors as the first cat café in Rotterdam. In 2017, the cat cafe Jippies opened in Haarlem. In 2018, the cat cafe De Familie Snorhaar opened in Breda.

=== Poland ===
Kociarnia, the first cat café in Poland opened in Cracow in June 2015. The name is a combination of Polish words kocia (of a cat) and kawiarnia (a café).

A second cat café, Miau Café, opened in Warsaw in January 2016. The café offers coffee, cakes and vegan items for guests while acting as a shelter for homeless cats. The Miau Café came to life because of the crowdfunding campaign on the Polish platform, wspieram.to, where some 1,700 residents of Warsaw contributed the financial resources to make the idea of the first cat café in Warsaw come true.

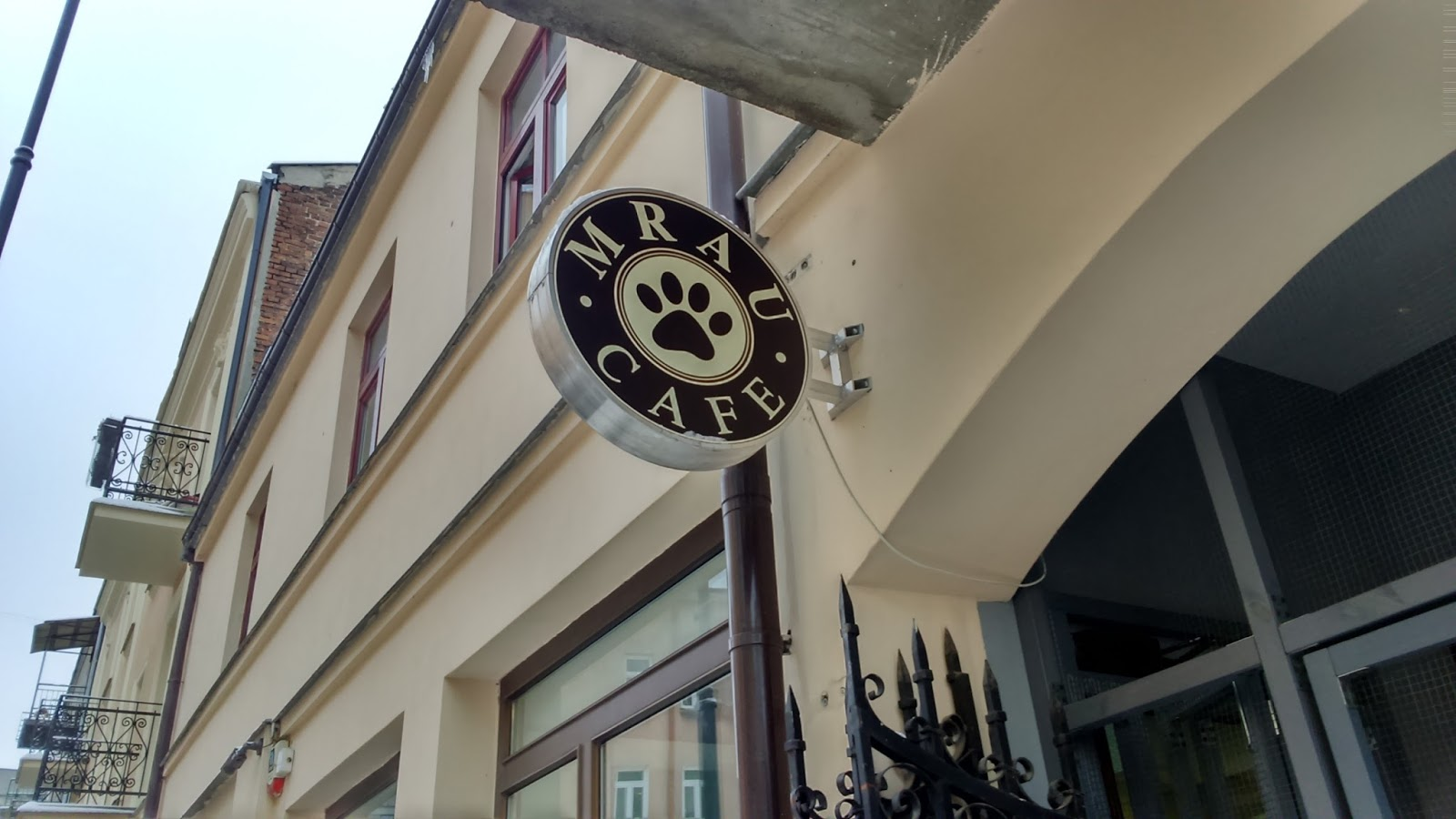
Signboard of Mrau Cafe, Lublin, Poland

In 2016, a cat café was opened in Lublin. After one day of activity, it was closed by sanitary inspectors. It was the subject of many controversies in the local media. Eventually, the conflict was settled and the café remains open.

Cat cafés in Poland also include Kocie Cafe in Białystok, which opened in 2022 in cooperation with the Podlachian non-profit cat care foundation Kotkowo, and Kotka Cafe in Oliwa, Gdańsk, opened in 2017 and relocated to Wreszcz in 2025, both of which are restricted to ages 14 and up.

=== Romania ===
Miau Cafe was opened in Spring 2015 in Bucharest. The second cat café in Romania, La Pisici Cafe opened in September 2015 in Timișoara. A coffee house named Lady Cat also opened in Cluj-Napoca in March 2016.

=== Russia ===
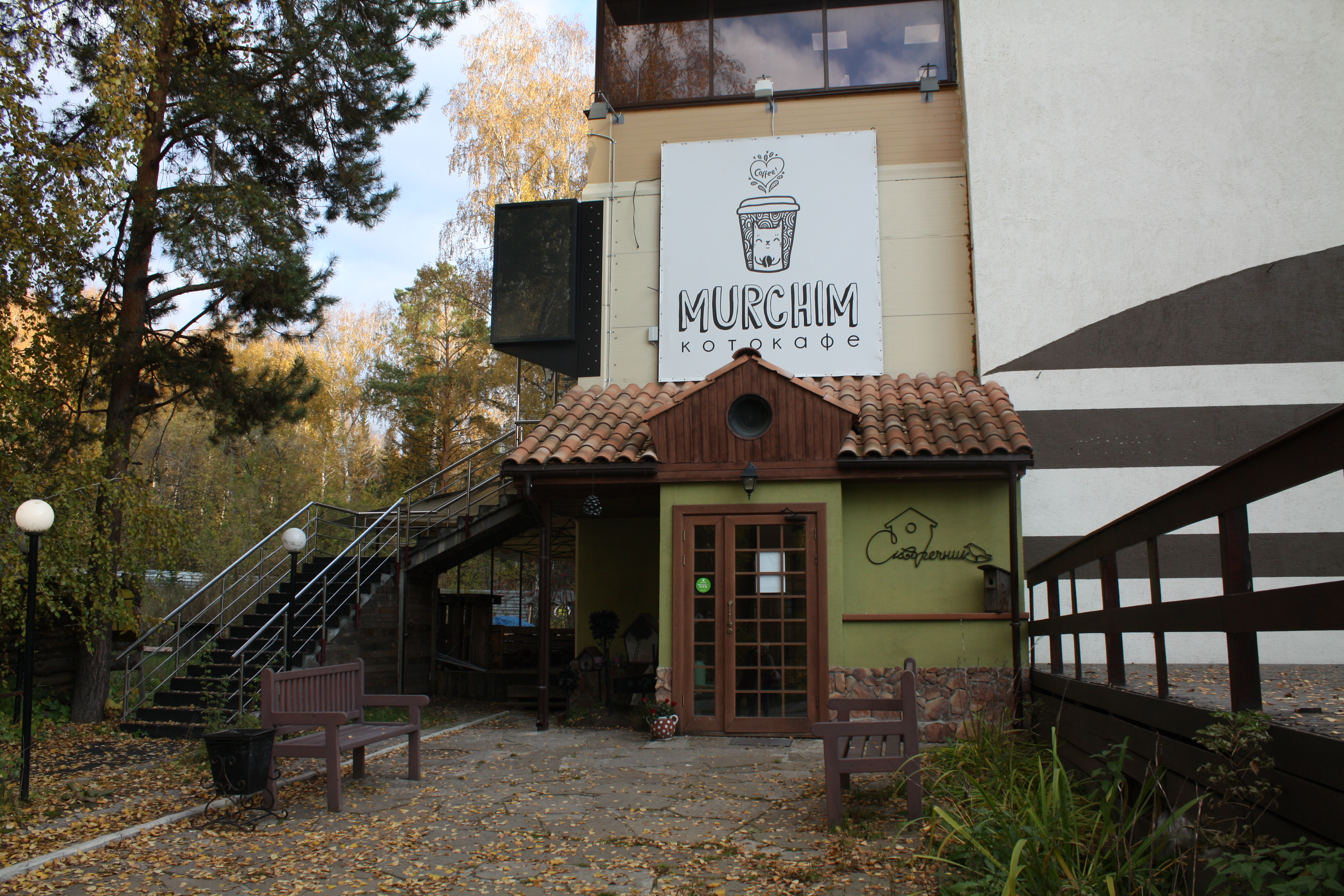
Cat café in Novosibirsk, Russia.

The first cat café in Europe and in Russia Cats Republic was opened in the centre of Saint Petersburg in 2011. A second Cats Republic café with a different name (Республика Котов) was opened in 2016.

Other cat cafés in Russia include Cats and People (Котики и люди) in Moscow, Murchim in Nizhny Novgorod, and many more in other major cities.

=== Slovakia ===
The first cat café in Slovakia, Pradúce klbko (previously as "Cafe Cats klub") was opened in Martin in April 2015. The next one, Mačkafé opened in Bratislava in May 2015. The second one in Bratislava, Mačinézy opened in October 2015. A cat café named Mňaukafé also opened in Prešov in June 2017 as actually fourth in Slovakia. A Cat Café Club was opened in Poprad in February 2018.

=== Sweden ===
The first cat café in Sweden was opened in Stockholm in 2019 named Java Whiskers, with all cats open for adoption.

=== Switzerland ===
Switzerland's first cat café, Casa del Gato in Zurich, was open from 2021 to August 2026. Another cat café opened in mid-2021 in Hinwil in the canton of Zurich.

=== Ukraine ===
The first cat café in Ukraine was opened in Cherkasy in 2015. After that, more cat cafés were opened in Lviv and Kharkiv.

=== United Kingdom ===
==== England ====
The first British cat café was opened in Totnes in June 2013. However, it closed in May 2014.

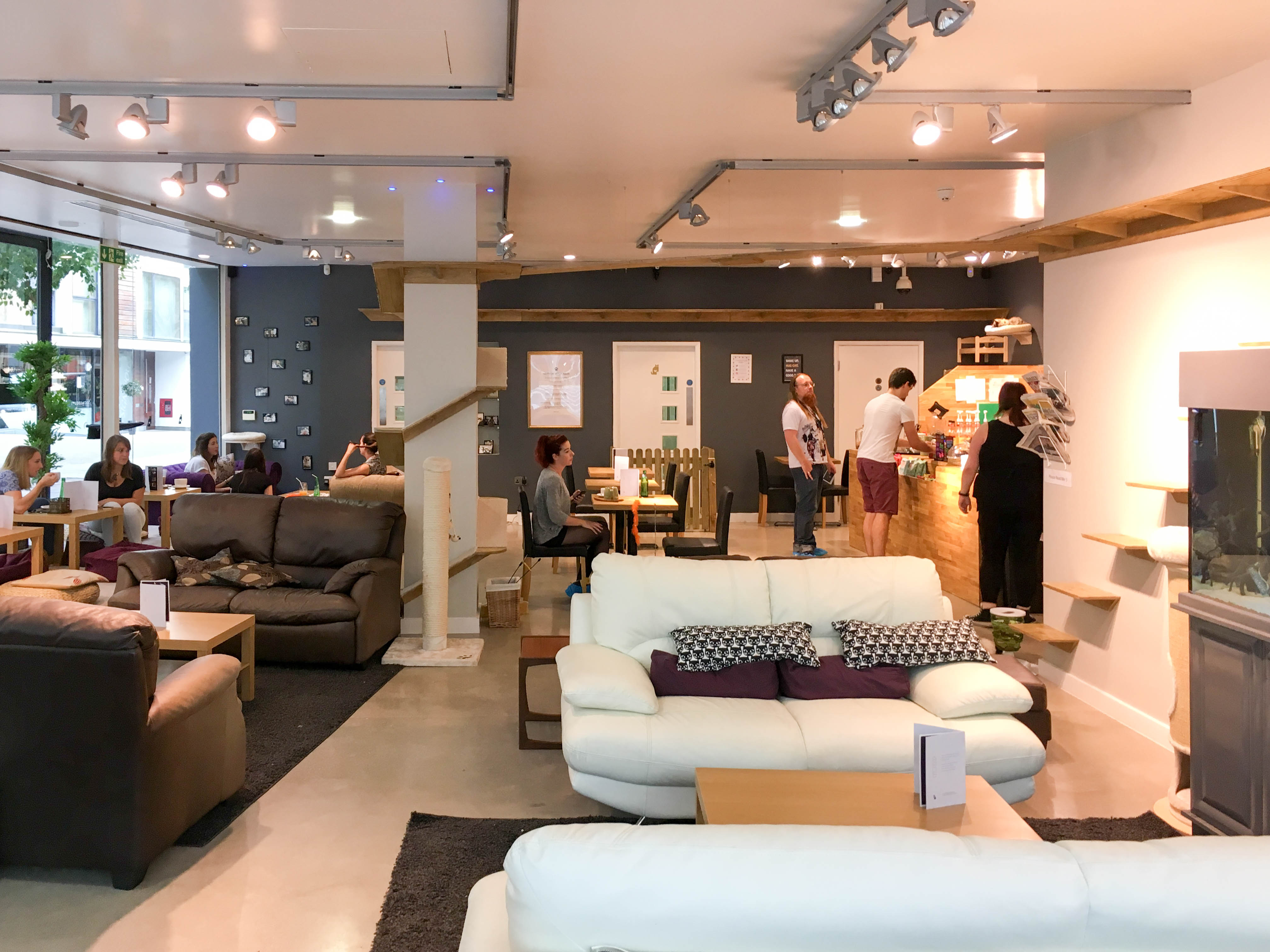
The Manchester Cat Café

In 2014, Lady Dinah's Cat Emporium in Bethnal Green, London, opened, with a two-month waiting list. Newcastle upon Tyne is home to Mog on The Tyne cat café, and Catpawcino. Nottingham has a cat café called Kitty Café. In 2015, several other UK cafes were in planning.

The Bag of Nails in Bristol is a cat pub, and has had as many as 24 cats. You&Meow, Bristol's first dedicated cat café, opened in February 2017 after a crowdfunding campaign. It has 14 cats.

A cat café opened in the of Manchester on 30 July 2016.

The first cat café in Bournemouth, Pause Cat Café, was opened in 2016. This was funded by a crowdfunding campaign and contains 12 resident rescue cats, in addition to promoting the rescuing of cats.

Paws For Thought Cat Cafe, Romsey, was opened in October 2018, and was the first cat café to open up in Hampshire. It has eight resident cats, which were rescued in the UK and in Romania.

Shakespaw Cat Cafe opened in Stratford-upon-Avon in 2018. The cats are named after characters in Shakespeare's plays, including Hamlet, Ophelia, Romeo and Bottom.

Kiko's Cat Cafe in Rye, East Sussex opened in September 2023. They are a rescue and rehoming based cat cafe, with cats rescued from both the UK and abroad by their partner charity, People's Animal Welfare Society.

==== Scotland ====
Maison de Moggy in Edinburgh is the first cat café in Scotland and was opened in January 2015. Purrple Cat Cafe is planning to be Glasgow's first cat café, and was due to open in the summer of 2017 but was delayed due to prolonged works, until it was finished near the end of the year. In early 2017, another cat café had opened called Cats Meow Kit-Tea Café in Stirling.

== North America ==
Cat cafés have been spreading across North America since 2014. The goal in North America generally is to help get cats adopted by partnering with local cat rescues or humane societies.

Most cat cafes in North America do not own the cats themselves. Instead, they partner with animal shelters, nonprofit rescue organizations and foster networks. The rescue organization usually retains ownership of the cats and manages the adoption approvals, while the cafe provides a comfortable space where potential adopters can meet them.

One challenge with traditional shelters is that cats may be scared, withdrawn, or stressed in cages. Several cat cafes emphasize that allowing cats to roam in a home-like environment helps adopters observe energy level, sociability, behavior around people, and compatibility with other cats. This gives adopters more information than a short meeting through kennel bars.

=== Canada ===
The first cat café to open in Canada was Le Café des Chats/Cat Café Montreal in Montreal, Quebec, Canada, which opened its doors to the public in August 2014. Café Chat L'Heureux (also in Montreal) was opened in September 2014 with 8 cats adopted from local shelters.

On 17 October 2015, My Kitty Café was opened as Ontario's first cat café, located in Guelph, Ontario.

In December 2015, Catfe opened as the first cat café in Vancouver, British Columbia. In July 2019 a cat café named Catoro, based on a Studio Ghibli theme, opened in Vancouver.

The Siberian Cat Café opened in 2015 in Chelsea, Quebec. This cat café had only Siberian cats, making it the first hypoallergenic cat café in the world.

=== United States ===
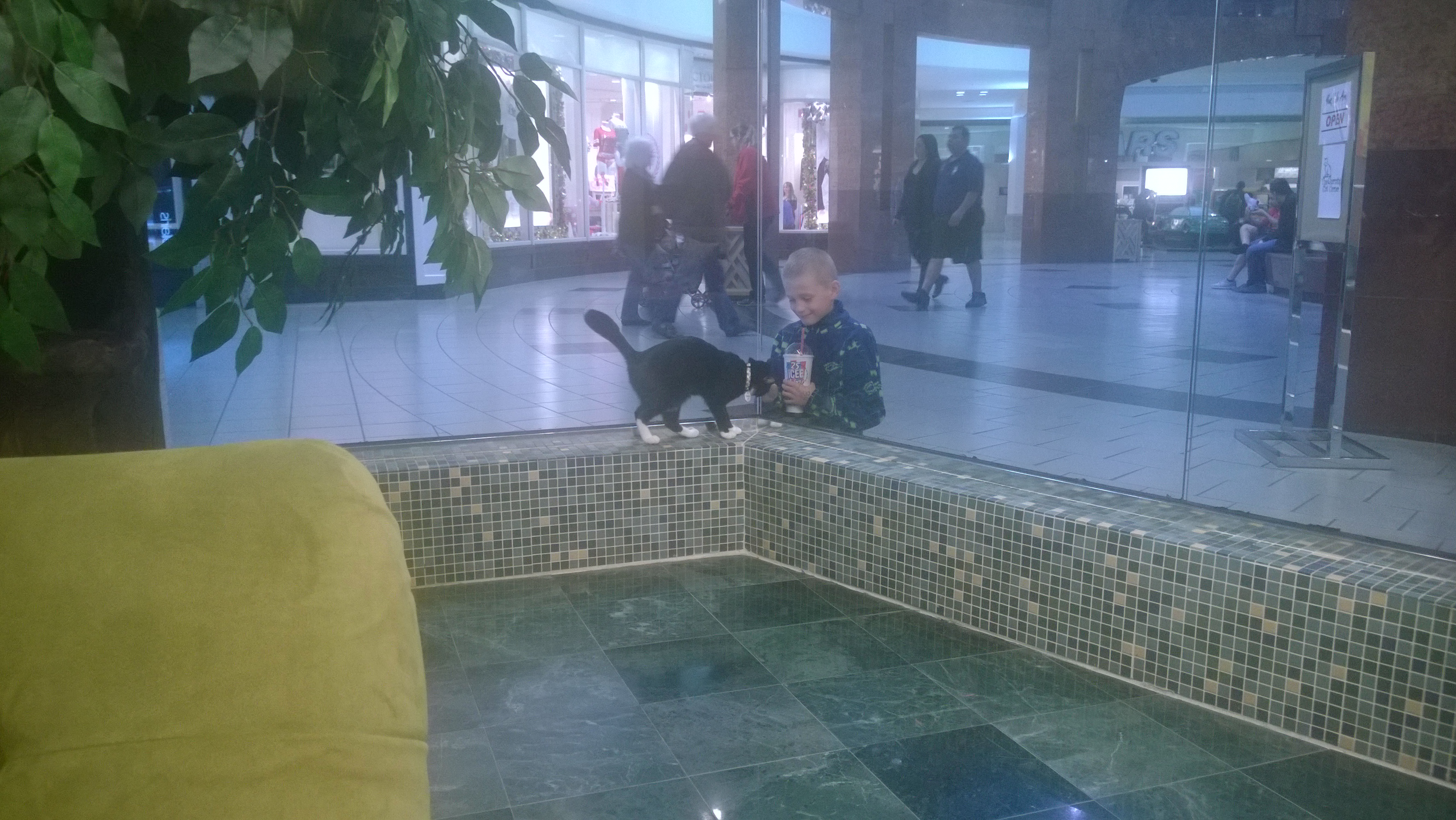
The Charming Cat Cafe in Vista Ridge Mall, Lewisville, Texas

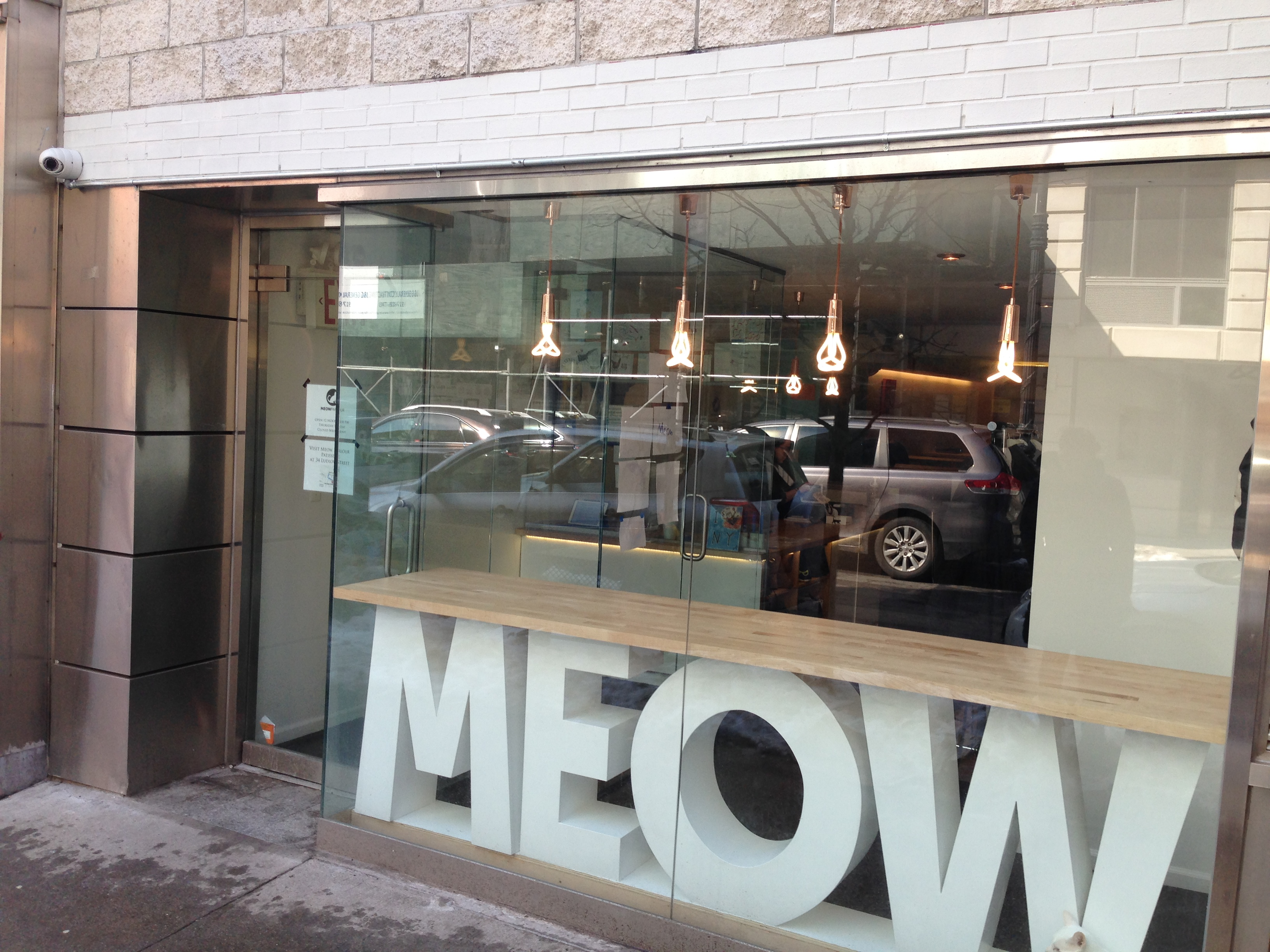
A cat café on the Lower East Side of Manhattan, New York City

In the United States, most health departments require special steps to separate the cafe area from the area where the cats are housed. In some cases, this even extends to areas that cats pass through only briefly (e.g., an adopted cat must leave through a separate door without passing an area that prepares food).

Gaining regulatory approval can be difficult, as with KitTea of San Francisco. Starting the process in November 2013, KitTea's design was finally approved in August 2014 after extensive negotiation with San Francisco's Health Department. Oakland's Cat Town was the first cat cafe to open its doors to customers, signing a lease in July 2014 and opening just months later in October. These timelines highlight not only the regulatory hurdles for cat cafes that prepare food on premises, but also differences between local governments that are mere miles from one another.

In contrast to Japanese cat cafés, US cafes typically focus on adoptions. Within seven months of being open, Cat Town reported that "the euthanasia rate at its partner shelter has declined from 41 to 21 percent, and 184 cats have made the transition from the cafe's Cat Zone to permanent homes". Similarly, The Cat Cafe in San Diego has facilitated adoptions for more than 250 cats (January 2015 – October 2017) and KitTea of San Francisco has adopted 203 (June 2015 – February 2018).

In January 2015, Purrington's Cat Lounge opened its first cat café in Portland, Oregon. Purrington's Cat Lounge later closed in 2022 after business suffered from the COVID-19 Pandemic.

In June 2015, Crumbs and Whiskers opened its first cat café in Washington, D.C., where it partnered with the local chapter of the Humane Society; this café provides a boarding space for around 15–25 cats at a time, all of which are provided by the Humane Society and made available for adoption. Crumbs and Whiskers subsequently opened its second café in Los Angeles, California in September 2016.

The first cafe in New York City, Meow Parlor, opened in Manhattan in 2014. In September 2015, a second café opened in Manhattan, called Koneko, supporting cats from Anjellicle Cats Rescue. A cat cafe in New York City's borough of Brooklyn opened in 2016. The first cafe in the New York City borough of Queens opened in March 2025 in the neighborhood of Flushing.

In October 2015, the Blue Cat Cafe opened in Austin, Texas, partnering with the Austin Humane Society as a cafe and adoption centre. After years of controversy surrounding the café's role in the gentrification of East Austin and a 2017 interview the owner gave to InfoWars, a website known for propagating far-right conspiracy theories, the Blue Cat Cafe closed in February 2019. Three years later, the Purrfecto Cat Lounge opened in Austin in partnership with the Sunshine Fund and the Fuzzy Texan Animal Rescue. In In December 2015, the first cat cafe in Dallas, Texas—The Charming Cat Cafe—opened in Vista Ridge Mall, showcasing kitties from Kitty Save.

In December 2015, Seattle, Washington, opened its first cat café, called Seattle Meowtropolitan. In 2017 NEKO Cat Cafe was opened and became the second cat café in Seattle. In 2020, NEKO Cat Cafe opened a second branch in the northern city of Bellingham, Washington.

In March 2016, Cat Cafe Mad opened in Madison, Wisconsin, but was set to close the next year. In December 2016, Ashley Brooks opened "Pounce Cat Cafe + Wine Bar" in Charleston, South Carolina. Pounce has partnered with the largest animal shelter in South Carolina, Charleston Animal Society.

In 2017, the Cafe Meow became the first cat café to open in Minnesota, Tinker's Cat Café became the first cat café to open in Utah, and The Purrfect Roast became Chicago's first cat café. It has since shut down. In 2018, the Windy Kitty Cat Cafe opened in Chicago.

Also in 2017, in Grand Rapids, the Happy Cat Café became the first cat café in Michigan. Unlike most cat cafés, the Happy Cat Café requires that visitors schedule their visits ahead of time, and in large groups. They act as a cat themed party venue, with specialized events like cat yoga parties as well as more traditional events involving food and cats. Due to the COVID-19 pandemic, Happy Cat Café was shut down for most of 2020, during which they performed renovations, and re-opened on 2 January 2021, but only for one-hour events for small groups.

In Boston, the Purr Cat cafe opened in 2017 but closed in 2019 after controversy before and following its opening. A Sanctuary Cafe opened in the Boston neighborhood of Beacon Hill in 2024.

Two cat cafés, Colony Cafe and The Black Cat Market, have opened in Pittsburgh. The Black Cat Market has experienced several of the regulatory issues outlined above. Columbus, Ohio, was home to the Eat Purr Love Cat Cafe, which was open from 2016 to 2020, with Kitty Bubble Café opening in fall 2022.

Naughty Cat Cafe opened in Chattanooga, Tennessee, in March 2019. They house 30 adoptable cats and visitors can enjoy coffee, tea and beer while spending time with the cats.

== Oceania ==
=== New Zealand ===
The first cat café in New Zealand, the Cat Lounge, opened in November 2015. There are now many cat cafés across New Zealand.

== Perspectives ==
In some jurisdictions, cat cafés allow humans to pet, feed, and play with cats, and other domesticated animals. In the United Kingdom, animal charities disagree on whether cat cafés are a suitable environment for cats, with the RSPCA, Cats Protection and the Celia Hammond Animal Trust criticising them for keeping large numbers of cats in a confined space with a revolving population of people. However, International Cat Care, a nonprofit organization, takes a more positive view, saying, "It is a difficult environment to get right but it's not impossible by any means." All the charities agreed that cat cafés need to be properly regulated.

== See also ==
- Animal cafe
- List of Taiwanese inventions and discoveries
- Petting zoo
