= Pet rental =

Practice of renting pets

Pet rental is the practice, usually administered by for-profit companies, of renting pets such as dogs and cats. Rental also includes animals who are hired out at a specific rate for a specific time. It is a controversial practice opposed by many animal rights advocates and has been banned in at least one municipality: Boston, Massachusetts.

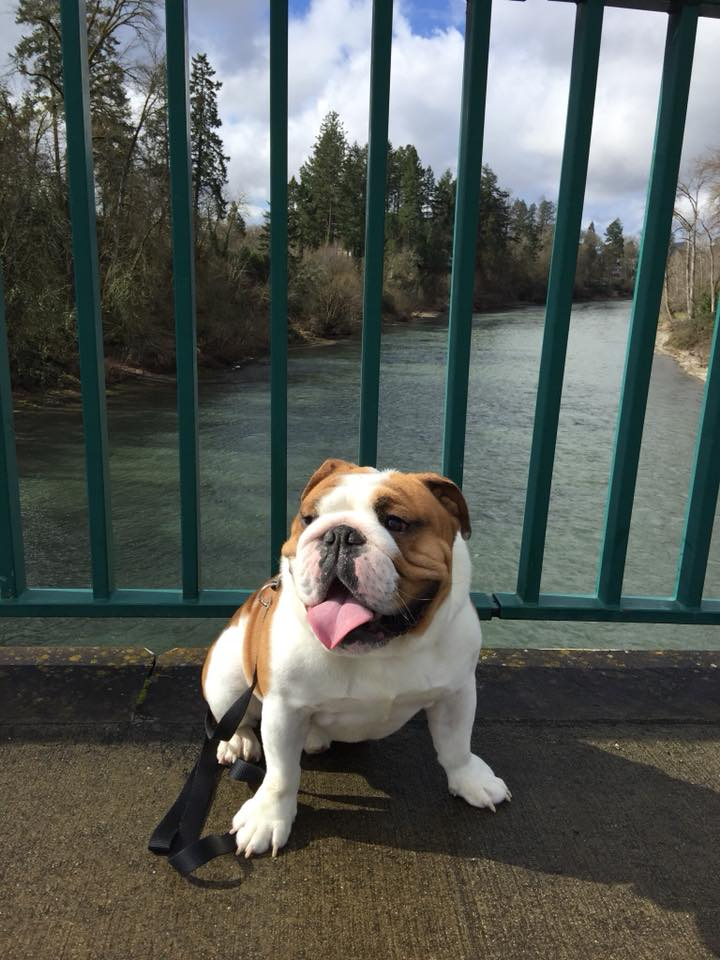
Emotional support AKC English Bulldog

== Methods of pet rental ==
=== Therapy dogs ===
There are several methods of renting a therapy dog as a part of the Mayo Clinic's Caring Canines program. The dogs that participate in this method of pet renting make regular visits to various hospital departments and can make special visits upon request. The dogs that participate in this program have been welcomed by the patients and are considered a good distraction from the atmosphere of the hospital.

=== Renting for an event ===
Another method of pet rental includes renting animals for an event. Animal Craze, a traveling farm, specializes in renting animals for birthday parties or other events. These services usually range from $200 to $500 depending on the number of animals and the kind of animals a person chooses to rent. Mobile Zoos are also a form of pet renting for events. Mobile Zoos are popular in the United Kingdom and provide exotic animals for children's parties. Another form of pet renting includes puppy parties. Puppy parties usually include 5-10 puppies that are placed in a playpen for people to come and either cuddle, handle, or play with. If the people at the party are younger in age, they are instructed on how to properly handle the puppies. The puppies at these parties are usually between 2-6 months old.

=== Renting pets as a test ===
Another common method of pet renting is to test whether or not a person is ready to take on the responsibilities of being an owner. This also includes pet renting for various reasons listed below:

- Not being able to have animals in their house due to rental agreements.
- Not being able to have animals in the house due to allergies.
- Not being able to properly take care of an animal due to excessive traveling or work.
- Not being able to currently afford an animal or supplies necessary for caring for a pet.

== Cat cafés ==
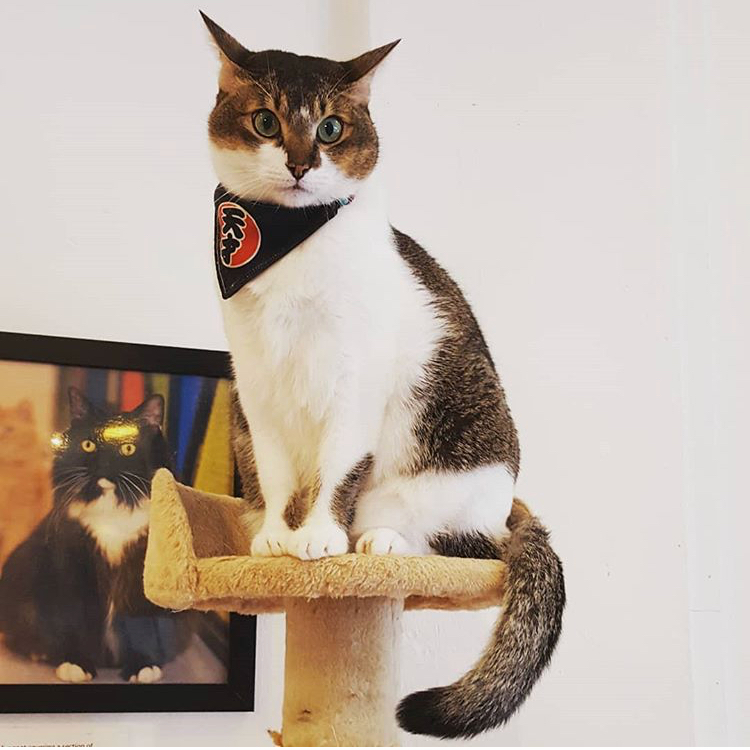
Adult cat perching in Singapore Cat Cafe

The first known cat café was located in Taipei, Taiwan, named Cat Flower Garden, in 1998; it became a place for stressed out humans drink coffee and pet cats, and the idea spread to Japan because most renters were not allowed to own pets.

In some jurisdictions, cat cafés allow humans to pet, feed, and play with cats and other domesticated animals. Originally popular in Taiwan, Singapore, Japan, and Korea, as of 2025, cat cafes exist in Dubai, Florida, Michigan, United Kingdom, Pennsylvania, and California. In Europe, cat cafés took off in places like Paris, Berlin, and London.

Dog cafés are also popular in Korea and the United States. In Korea, dogs in the café are from puppy mills and are not up for adoption. One café in Los Angeles, Grounds and Hounds, sponsors shelter dogs that are up for adoption. Customers can pet these puppies in a designated area of the café. For the animals to stay overnight, the café was built in an industrial zone, which is a requirement given by the Los Angeles Health Department.

== Importance ==
One method of pet renting is animal assisted therapy. Animal assisted therapy can help to reduce pain, anxiety, depression and fatigue in people with a range of health issues including: children having dental procedures, people receiving cancer treatment, people in long-term care facilities, people hospitalized with chronic heart failure and veterans with posttraumatic stress disorder (PTSD). Other benefits from programs that use pet renting include not only the people who are sick, but it also includes the loved ones of the ill patients too. Patient's family can also receive benefits due to the happiness that an animal can bring to their loved ones.

== Ethics ==
=== Concerns ===
In the United Kingdom, the use of Mobile Zoos has become a cause for concern. Because of this, Mobile Zoos will soon require licenses to operate in England. The RSPCA recently announced that the Mobile Zoos' were handling the meerkats and raccoons inappropriately. Under the changes to the Animal Welfare Act 2006, anyone who wishes to own a business that provides an animal for an exhibit must require a license from the local authority, including Mobile Zoos. The exhibits must also adhere to welfare standards developed with those working in the sector and animal welfare charities. Some of the biggest concerns that hospitals face is the safety and sanitation that comes with the therapy dogs that visit. Most hospitals with dog therapy programs have a strict policy to ensure that animals are clean, vaccinated, well trained and screened for appropriate behavior.

=== Animals in the media ===
Across the United States, there are over 40 animal talent agencies. Every day, agents audition talented animals for parts in film, theater, photo shoots, and television commercials. Each animal talent agency represents hundreds of clients which include animals in wildlife preserves, pets, and even domestic and exotic species. Though the need for animal actors is declining due to modern digital animation, for commercials, the typical rate in New York is $800 a day for a dog.

==== Abuse in the media ====
In the movie Snakes on a Plane, reptile wrangler Jules Sylvester had brought over 27 types of snakes on the movie set. Snakes get tired after an hour of work, and can become over stressed, causing a snake not to eat for a week. It is for this reason that particular snakes are leased for an hour at a time.

=== Animal safety ===
The American Animal Defense League (AADL) started taking measures to protect hired animal actors from abuse. Investigations involved popular Hollywood studios such as Warner Brothers and 20th Century Fox regarding abuse in films as well as abusive living conditions. More recently, the American Humane Association's (AHA) Film and Television Unit have taken the initiative to make sure animal actors were not harmed in the making of the movie. The AHA began monitoring the safety of animals after Jesse James provoked an outcry when a horse was forced to leap to its death from the top of a cliff in 1939. The AHA prides itself on ensuring safety for all animal actors.

==== Highest paid animal actors ====
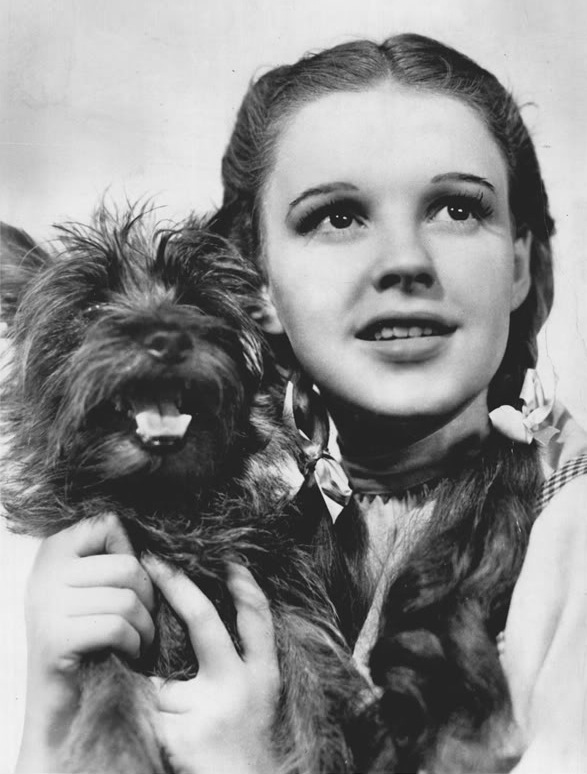
The Wizard of Oz Judy Garland and Terry, 1939

The animals people gaze upon on the internet, in advertisements, are prized for their “cuteness.” This was seen in the 1939 film The Wizard of Oz, as Toto or “Terry the Terrier” made over $125 per week, compared to the Munchkins, who made only $50 per week.

Other famous animal actors include...

- Rin Tin Tin the German Shepherd (1954) — $6,000 per week
- Pal (dog) (1959) — $4,000 per week
- Keiko (orca) — 35 million in career earnings
- Moose (dog) — $10,000 per episode
- Crystal the Monkey — $12,000 per episode
- Bart the Bear (1980–1990) — 6 million in career earnings
- Higgins (dog) (1974–2000) — 200 million in career earnings

== See also ==
- Cat café
