= Cats in the United States =

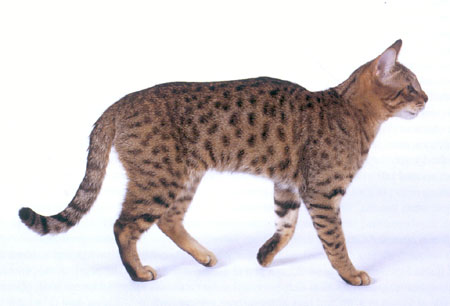
The California Spangled is a breed of domestic cat that was bred in the United States to resemble spotted wild cats, like the ocelot and leopard.

Many different species of mammal can be classified as cats (felids) in the United States. These include domestic cats (both house cats and feral), of the species Felis catus; medium-sized wild cats from the genus Lynx; and big cats from the genera Puma and Panthera. Domestic cats vastly outnumber wild cats in the United States.

== Prehistoric cats ==
At least 67 species of sabertoothed cats existed in North America between 42 million and 11 thousand years ago before going extinct. Their disappearance can be attributed to both the changing climate at the end of the Ice Age and the appearance of humans in the Americas.

Some prehistoric animals referred to as "saber-toothed cats" were in fact marsupials and not cats at all, but called such because of their resemblance to true felines with large canine teeth.

== Big cats ==
Two main species of big cat once inhabited the United States. One is the jaguar (Panthera onca), which is related to many species of big cat found on other continents. Though there are single jaguars now living within Arizona, the species has largely been extirpated from the United States (in the states of Texas, Colorado, New Mexico, and Louisiana) since the early 20th century; although it is found throughout most of South America, its territorial limit being lands further south than northern Argentina.

The other North American 'big cat' is the cougar (Puma concolor), which is also known as the puma, mountain lion, catamount, panther, and many other names. Despite weighing 70 kg. (150 lbs) on average and being called a 'mountain lion,' the cougar is not a member of Panthera and is more closely related to the domesticated cat than it is to lions.

Cougars can be found throughout the continental Americas. Though they may have been more evenly distributed in the United States and Canada (as far north as the southern Yukon border), their populations are currently highest in the western states and provinces respectively. However, western (and possibly southern) cougars are migrating and being encountered more frequently in ranges where the eastern cougar population was previously extirpated and declared extinct. This includes the US mid-west and east coast, and central and eastern Canadian provinces. Populations of cougars in Florida have always been continuous and well known.

== Wild cats ==
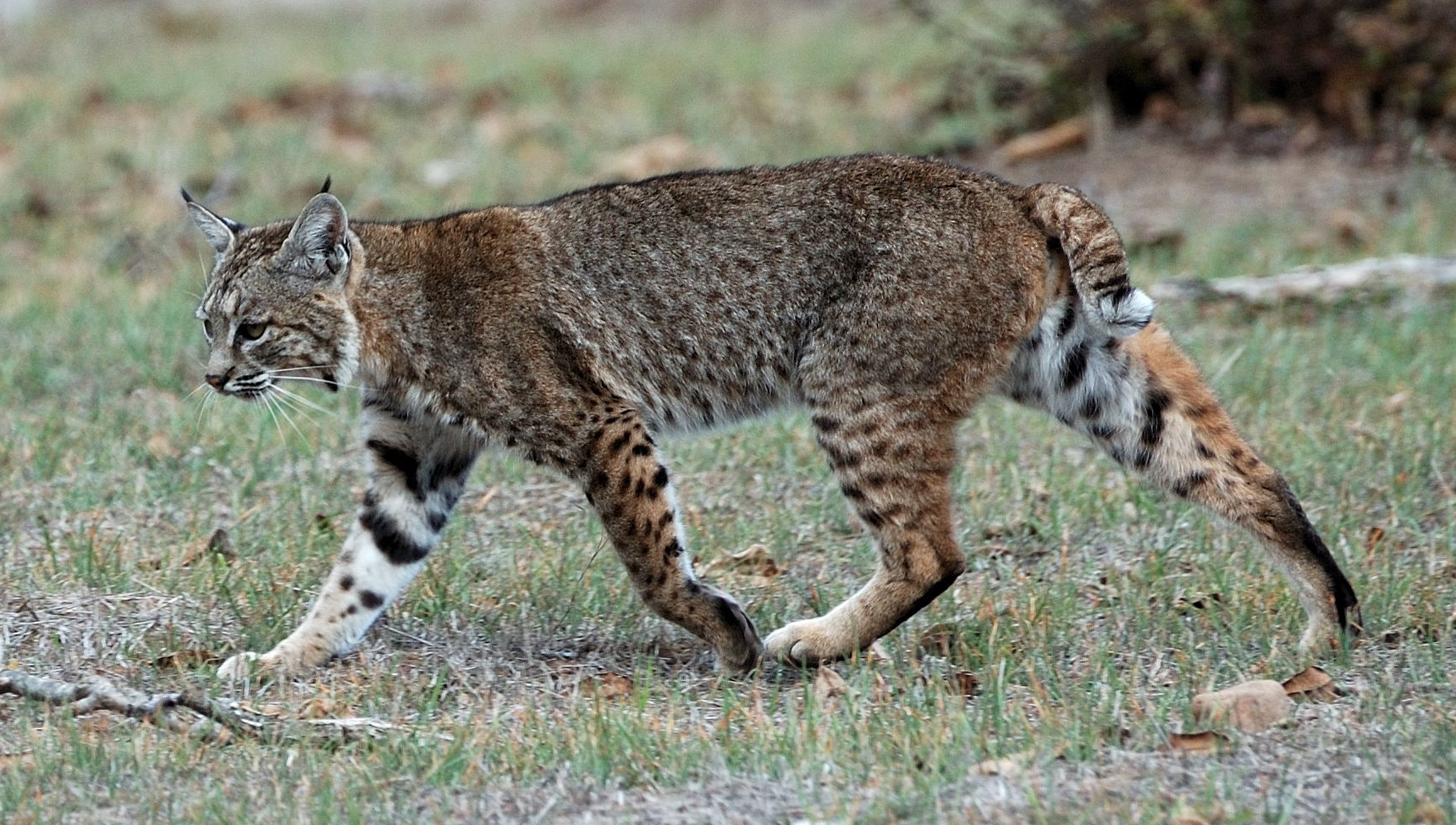
A bobcat on the Calero Creek Trail near San Jose, California.

Three mammal species in the United States are referred to as "wild cats": the ocelot (Leopardus pardalis), the Canada lynx (Lynx canadensis), and the bobcat (Lynx rufus). However, none of these animals belong to Felis, the genus of the wildcat and the domestic cat. The ocelot is found in low numbers only in Arizona and Texas (and was once found in Arkansas and Louisiana as well), and is in the genus Leopardus, small spotted cats that inhabit the Americas; the Canada lynx (distributed in the Western United States, New England, Alaska, and Canada) and bobcat (ranging from southern Canada to central Mexico) are both in the genus Lynx, which inhabit Eurasia and North America. The jaguarundi (Herpailurus yagouaroundi), found in Central and South America, also once occurred near the lower Rio Grande Valley in the southern tip of Texas, along with the margay (Leopardus wiedii); both are considered possibly extirpated from the United States.

== Domestic cats ==
The domestic cat (Felis catus) is a popular pet, with an estimated 76.3 million cats kept as pets and 32.6% to 37% of all households in the United States keeping at least one as of 2025. Eighty-seven percent of owned cats are spayed or neutered.

The Centers for Disease Control and Prevention does not require a certificate of health for cats brought into the United States, but cats are subject to inspection at ports of entry and may be denied entry. Cats must be quarantined regardless of place of origin when brought into Hawaii and Guam.

== Organizations ==
Various organizations using the term Society for the Prevention of Cruelty to Animals (SPCA) and in United States all organizations using the name SPCA are independent; there is no umbrella organization. Some of the more notable organizations include:

- American Society for the Prevention of Cruelty to Animals
- New Jersey Society for the Prevention of Cruelty to Animals
- Society for the Prevention of Cruelty to Animals, Monterey County, California
- San Francisco SPCA

The National Cat Groomers Institute of America is an organization devoted to training and certifying people in the grooming of cats. Headquartered in Greenville, South Carolina, it was founded in 2007 by Danelle German, the organization's current president.

Cats Indoors! is a public education campaign by American Bird Conservancy and supported by the National Audubon Society and other conservation organizations to encourage control of cats in order to protect birds from predation by cats. The objective of the conservancy's campaign is that all domestic cats should be kept safely indoors.

== See also ==
- Fauna of the United States
