= California Spangled =

Breed of cat

California Spangled Cat
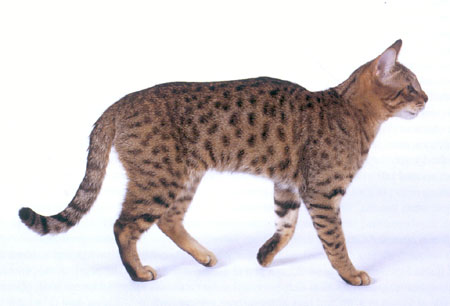
- Other names: Spangle
- Origin: United States (California)
- Breed status: Not recognized as a standardized breed by any major breed registry.

The California Spangled Cat is an experimental breed of cat with markings that resemble the cheetah or leopard created by Paul Casey.

== History ==
Paul Casey was inspired to create the breed from a conversation he had with Louis Leakey. In relation to the death of a leopard by poachers Casey and Leakey discussed how people would be more likely to support conservation efforts if they had a cat that resembled a leopard.

Casey started with breeding a female Traditional Siamese to a Turkish Angora. Later breeds added to the bloodline were the British Shorthair, American Shorthair, Manx, and Abyssinian. Later on moggies from Malaysia and Egypt were added to the gene pool. By 1985 the look of the breed had been established and managed to form a breed club, the California Spangled Cat Association.

Casey advertised his breed in the Neiman-Marcus catalog which generated controversy from both fanciers and animal rights activists, the latter due to Neiman-Marcus catalog advertising animal coats. The widespread publicity worked in Casey's favour and hundreds of people inquired about the breed.

Despite the publicity the breeds numbers progressed slowly due to most cats being sold. In 1994 a California Sprangled won best in show at a Paris fancier competition.

In 2003 only around 200 California Sprangled Cats were recorded to exist.

== Recognition ==
The California Sprangled has experimental recognition with both the American Cat Association (ACA) and The International Cat Association (TICA).

== Appearance ==
The California Sprangled's markings are similar to that of a leopard or cheetah with well defined spots and musculature. The spots may be round, square, triangular, and oval. Eyelet, fish scale, and crescent spots are disallowed.
