= Deaths in May 2010 =

The following is a list of notable deaths in May 2010.

Entries for each day are listed alphabetically by surname. A typical entry lists information in the following sequence:

- Name, age, country of citizenship at birth, subsequent country of citizenship (if applicable), reason for notability, cause of death (if known), and reference.

== May 2010 ==
=== 1 ===
- Danny Aiello III, 53, American stuntman (Eternal Sunshine of the Spotless Mind, Shooter, Rescue Me), pancreatic cancer.
- T. M. Aluko, 91, Nigerian writer.
- Mohammad Bahmanbeigi, 90, Iranian educator.
- Don Caruth, 59, American politician, minority leader of the West Virginia Senate, brain cancer.
- Jean-Louis Dumas, 72, French businessman, Hermès group chairman (1978–2006).
- Ramakrushna Gouda, 77, Indian politician.
- Antoine Hayek, 81, Lebanese Melkite Greek Catholic prelate, archbishop of Baniyas (1989–2006).
- Vytautas Janulionis, 52, Lithuanian glass artist.
- Zygmunt Kamiński, 77, Polish Roman Catholic prelate, archbishop of Szczecin-Kamień (1999–2009).
- Dragan Kujović, Montenegrin politician, President (2003).
- Rob McConnell, 75, Canadian jazz musician, cancer.
- Lawrence Paul, 84, Canadian Mi'kmaq tribe leader, chief of the Membertou First Nation (1967–1969).
- Helen Wagner, 91, American actress (As the World Turns), cancer.

=== 2 ===
- Ann Aldrich, 82, American district judge from 1980 to 2010, heart and kidney problems.
- Moshe Hirsch, 86, Israeli Neturei Karta rabbi and anti-Zionist, Palestinian National Authority Minister for Jewish Affairs, after long illness.
- André Lamy, 77, Canadian film producer, after long illness.
- Andrew McFarlane, 32, Australian motocross racer, accident during practice.
- Murray Nicoll, 66, Australian journalist and broadcaster, Ash Wednesday fires commentator, leukaemia.
- Santiago Carlos Oves, 68, Argentine film director.
- Lynn Redgrave, 67, English actress (Georgy Girl, Gods and Monsters, Tom Jones), breast cancer.

=== 3 ===
- Mohammed Abed al-Jabri, 73, Moroccan philosopher and writer.
- M Innas Ali, 93, Bangladeshi physicist.
- Luigi Amaducci, 86, Italian Roman Catholic prelate, archbishop of Ravenna-Cervia (1990–2000).
- Florencio Campomanes, 83, Filipino chess player, President of FIDE (1982–1995).
- Stefan Doernberg, 85, German writer and teacher.
- Jack Friedman, 70, American businessman, co-founder of Jakks Pacific.
- Jimmy Gardner, 85, British character actor (The Curse of the Mummy's Tomb, Harry Potter and the Prisoner of Azkaban, Finding Neverland) .
- Karl Kasten, 94, American painter.
- Stephen Ledogar, 80, American arms control negotiator, bladder cancer.
- Merv McIntosh, 87, Australian football player, heart attack.
- Bohumil Němeček, 72, Czech boxer, Olympic gold medalist (1960).
- Peter O'Donnell, 90, British writer (Modesty Blaise).
- Nick Rogers, 30, American football player (Minnesota Vikings), auto accident.
- Kinji Shibuya, 88, American professional wrestler and actor (Mr. T and Tina), natural causes.
- El Supremo, 67, Mexican professional wrestler, heart attack.
- Garland Warren, 74, Canadian football player (Winnipeg Blue Bombers).
- Günter Wendt, 85, German-born American spacecraft engineer (NASA ), heart failure and stroke.

=== 4 ===
- Sheikh Nur Mohamed Abkey, 51-52, Somalian journalist, shot.
- David Apter, 85, American political scientist, complications of cancer.
- Brita Borg, 83, Swedish actress, singer and variety show artist.
- Danny Chandler, 50, American motocross champion, complications from paralysis.
- Ángel Cristo, 65, Spanish animal tamer and circus promoter, cardiac arrest.
- Bill Dale, 93, Canadian track and field athlete.
- Sheena Duncan, 77, South African anti-apartheid campaigner, leader of Black Sash, after long illness.
- Ernie Harwell, 92, American baseball sportscaster (Detroit Tigers), cholangiocarcinoma.
- Peter Heathfield, 81, British trade unionist.
- Sipho Jele, 35, Swazi politician.
- Freddy Kottulinsky, 77, German-born Swedish racing driver.
- William Lubtchansky, 73, French cinematographer, heart disease.
- Denis Obua, 62, Ugandan footballer.
- Luigi Poggi, 92, Italian Roman Catholic prelate.
- Joan Rendell, 89, British writer.
- Dustin Shuler, 61, American sculptor (Spindle), pancreatic cancer.
- Hadi Soesastro, 65, Indonesian economist and intellectual, founder of the CSIS, brain hemorrhage.

=== 5 ===
- Lucho Barrios, 76, Peruvian bolero singer.
- Louis Bisilliat, 79, French cyclist.
- Ray Blum, 91, American Olympic speed skater.
- Alessandra Codazzi, 88, Italian trade unionist, partisan and politician, Senator (1976-1987).
- Marcello Costalunga, 85, Italian Roman Catholic prelate, Titular Archbishop of Aquileia (1991–2001).
- Joseph Kearney, 83, American athletic director, pancreatic cancer.
- Alfons Kontarsky, 77, German pianist.
- Armando Lucero, 68, Argentine sex offender, respiratory infection.
- Jack MacDonald, 82, Canadian politician, mayor of Hamilton, Ontario (1977–1980).
- Max Palevsky, 85, American entrepreneur, philanthropist and art collector.
- Harry Siljander, 87, Finnish Olympic bronze medal-winning (1952) boxer.
- Giulietta Simionato, 99, Italian mezzo-soprano.
- Gwyn Thomas, 96, Canadian crime reporter (Toronto Star), natural causes.
- Umaru Yar'Adua, 58, Nigerian politician, President (2007–2010).

=== 6 ===
- Hoàng Cầm, 88, Vietnamese poet and playwright.
- Jaroslav Cardal, 91, Czech Olympic cross-country skier.
- David E. Durston, 88, American film director and screenwriter (I Drink Your Blood), complications from pneumonia.
- Guillermo Meza, 21, Mexican footballer (Pumas Morelos), shot.
- Giacomo Neri, 94, Italian footballer.
- Mildred Ellen Orton, 99, American businesswoman, co-founder of the Vermont Country Store.
- Robin Roberts, 83, American baseball player (Philadelphia Phillies), Baseball Hall of Fame inductee, natural causes.
- Robert J. Serling, 92, American author, brother of Rod Serling.
- Dennis Sharp, 76, British architect, cancer.

=== 7 ===
- Francisco Aguabella, 84, Cuban-born American jazz percussionist, cancer.
- Bertha Allen, 75-76, Canadian activist, cancer.
- Juan Arcocha, 82, Cuban journalist and writer.
- Rane Arroyo, 55, American poet, cerebral hemorrhage.
- Anders Buraas, 94, Norwegian journalist.
- Babz Chula, 64, American actress (Adventures of Sonic the Hedgehog, The X-Files: I Want to Believe, Double Jeopardy), cancer.
- Dick Flowers, 84, American football player (Baltimore Colts).
- Pamela Green, 81, British actress and model, leukemia.
- Wally Hickel, 90, American politician, Secretary of the Interior (1969–1970), Governor of Alaska (1966–1969, 1990–1994), natural causes.
- Billy Kelly, 78, British boxer, after long illness.
- Zoran Kurteš, 44, Serbian handball player and coach, cardiac arrest.
- Adele Mara, 87, American actress (Sands of Iwo Jima), natural causes.
- Fríða Á. Sigurðardóttir, 69, Icelandic author.
- Svetozar Stojanović, 78, Serbian philosopher and political theorist.
- Flora L. Thornton, 96, American arts patron and philanthropist, pulmonary disease.
- Bert L. Vallee, 90, American professor.

=== 8 ===
- Bruce Alford Sr., 87, American football player (New York Yanks), and line judge, cancer.
- Shadreck Biemba, 45, Zambian footballer, cancer.
- Joaquín Capilla, 81, Mexican Olympic diving four-time medalist, heart failure.
- Sir Cecil Clothier, 90, Manx judge and public servant.
- Willis Eken, 79, American politician and farmer, member of the Minnesota House of Representatives.
- Andrew Hull, 46, Canadian-born film maker, film director and architect, head injury due to cycling accident.
- Stefanos Lazaridis, 67, Ethiopian-born Greek stage designer, cancer.
- Andor Lilienthal, 99, Russian-born Hungarian chess grandmaster.
- Giuseppe Ogna, 76, Italian Olympic cyclist.
- Peer Schmidt, 84, German actor, after long illness.
- Mark Shannon, 58, American radio personality (KTOK), lymphoid leukemia.
- George Susce, 78, American baseball player (Boston Red Sox).
- Alan Watkins, 77, British political journalist, renal failure.

=== 9 ===
- Danger Ashipala, 62, Namibian police advisor.
- Maksymilian Barański, 84, Polish footballer
- Erica Blasberg, 25, American golfer, suicide by drug overdose.
- Raymond Bouchex, 83, French Roman Catholic prelate, archbishop of Avignon (1978–2002).
- Dean Cetrulo, 91, American fencer, Olympic bronze medalist (1948 Summer Olympics).
- Geoffrey Chapman, 80, Australian publisher.
- Rita Childers, 95, Irish politician, wife of President Erskine Hamilton Childers.
- Zosima Davydov, 46, Russian Orthodox prelate, bishop of Yakutsk and Lensk (since 2004), heart attack.
- Hans Dijkstal, 67, Dutch politician, Minister of the Interior and Deputy Prime Minister (1994–1998), cancer.
- Francisco Andrés Escobar, 67, Salvadoran actor, journalist and writer.
- Lena Horne, 92, American singer and actress (Stormy Weather, The Wiz).
- Signe Johansson-Engdahl, 104, Swedish 1924 Olympic diver.
- Farzad Kamangar, 32, Iranian activist, execution by hanging.
- Craig Kauffman, 78, American painter and sculptor, complications from a stroke and pneumonia.
- Teruji Kogake, 77, Japanese Olympic athlete, liver failure.
- Mahāprajña, 89, Indian Jain religious leader, supreme head of Svetambar Terapanth, cardiac arrest.
- Otakar Motejl, 77, Czech public official, Ombudsman (since 2000), after short illness.
- Karl-Heinz Schnibbe, 86, German partisan, World War II resistance fighter.
- Edward Uhl, 92, American inventor, co-inventor of the bazooka, heart failure.

=== 10 ===
- Allan Andersson, 79, Swedish Olympic skier.
- Ike Franklin Andrews, 84, American politician, U.S. Representative from North Carolina (1973–1985).
- Albert W. Barney Jr., 89, American jurist, Chief Justice of the Vermont Supreme Court (1974–1982).
- Jack Birkett, 75, British dancer, singer and actor.
- Giuliana Camerino, 90, Italian handbag designer.
- Charles Currey, 94, British sailor, silver medallist at the 1952 Summer Olympics.
- Frank Frazetta, 82, American fantasy and science fiction artist, stroke.
- Bill Hook, 84, American-born chess player for British Virgin Islands.
- Margit Hvammen, 77, Norwegian Olympic Alpine skier.
- John Kempe, 92, British schoolteacher, headmaster of Gordonstoun School.
- Mac Mohan, 71, Indian actor (Sholay), lung cancer.
- Volodymyr Ploskina, 55, Ukrainian football manager and former footballer.
- Robert B. Salter, 85, Canadian surgeon.

=== 11 ===
- Ian Baker, 86, British architect.
- Robert H. Burris, 96, American biochemist.
- John Burton, 85, New Zealand cricketer.
- John Fugh, 75, American army officer, Judge Advocate General of the U.S. Army, heart attack.
- Brian Gibson, 82, English footballer (Huddersfield Town).
- Timothy Grubb, 55, British-born American show jumper, Olympic silver medallist (1984 Summer Olympics), heart failure.
- Karl-Erik Hult, 74, Swedish football player and manager.
- Rauf Jabbarov, 74, Azerbaijani boxing manager, heart attack.
- Josef Keck, 59, German Olympic biathlete.
- Maciej Kozłowski, 52, Polish actor, complications of hepatitis C.
- Richard LaMotta, 67, American inventor of the Chipwich ice cream sandwich, heart attack.
- Bud Mahurin, 91, American flying ace, complications from a stroke.
- Emmanuel Ngobese, 29, South African footballer, tuberculosis.
- Jeff Shaw, 60, Australian politician and jurist, NSW Attorney General (1995–2000), Supreme Court judge (2003–2004), pneumonia.
- Doris Eaton Travis, 106, American performer, last surviving Ziegfeld girl, aneurysm.
- Bob Watt, 82, Canadian ice hockey player, Olympic gold medalist (1952 Winter Olympics) .

=== 12 ===
- Anthony Andeh, 64, Nigerian Olympic boxer.
- Dieter Bock, 71, German businessman and multimillionaire, choking.
- Phyllis Hodges Boyce, 73, American actress (Gone with the Wind, Star Trek).
- Clive Fairbairn, 90, Australian cricketer.
- Charlie Francis, 61, Canadian track coach, lymphoma.
- Edith Keller-Herrmann, 88, German chess Grandmaster.
- Sione Laumanuʻuli Luani, 50, Tongan politician, governor of Vavaʻu (since 2009).
- Allan Manings, 86, American television writer (Rowan & Martin's Laugh-In, Good Times), cardiac arrest.
- Antonio Ozores, 81, Spanish actor, cancer.
- John Warham, 90, New Zealand ornithologist and photographer.
- Notable people killed in the crash of Afriqiyah Airways Flight 771:
  - Joëlle van Noppen, 30, Dutch singer.
  - Bree O'Mara, 42, South African novelist.

=== 13 ===
- Rafael Sanus Abad, 78, Spanish Roman Catholic prelate, Auxiliary Bishop of Valencia (1989–2000).
- Ashaari Mohammad, 73, Malaysian spiritual leader, respiratory infection.
- Ruth Chew, 90, American children's author, pneumonia.
- Paul Garabedian, 82, American mathematician.
- Eddie Garrett, 82, American actor (Looking for Mr. Goodbar, Quincy, M.E.).
- Cinthia Régia Gomes do Livramento, 46, Brazilian politician, Education Secretary (Amazonas), air crash.
- Walter Klimmek, 91, German footballer.
- Klaus Kotter, 75, German bobsleigh official.
- Richard Movitz, 84, American Olympic skier.
- Peter Provan, 73, Australian rugby league footballer, Balmain Tigers premiership captain (1969), after long illness.
- Rosa Rio, 107, American organist (Tampa Theatre).

=== 14 ===
- Ronald Bailey, 92, British diplomat.
- Frank J. Dodd, 72, American politician, President of the New Jersey Senate (1974–1975).
- Goh Keng Swee, 91, Singaporean politician, Deputy Prime Minister (1973–1984), after long illness.
- Norman Hand, 37, American football player (San Diego Chargers, New Orleans Saints), heart disease.
- Rūta Jokubonienė, 80, Lithuanian textile artist.
- Milouš Kvaček, 76, Czech football player and manager.
- David Maimon, 81, Israeli general, head of Israel Prison Service.
- Fred O'Donovan, 80, Irish theatre producer, Chairman of RTÉ Authority (1981–1985).
- Skip Away, 17, American thoroughbred racehorse, heart attack.
- Edmund Tsaturyan, 73, Armenian politician.
- Frederik van Zyl Slabbert, 70, South African politician, complications from liver disease.

=== 15 ===
- Harry Aleman, 71, American gangster and murderer, lung cancer.
- Frances Alexander, 90, American politician.
- Gabriel Bien-Aimé, Haitian politician, Minister of Education (2006–2008), heart attack.
- Armand Caouette, 64, Canadian politician, Member of Parliament (1974–1980).
- Juan José Carbó, 83, Spanish cartoonist.
- Moshe Greenberg, 81, American rabbi and biblical scholar.
- Christian Habicht, 57, German actor, heart attack.
- Besian Idrizaj, 22, Austrian footballer, heart attack.
- Loris Kessel, 60, Swiss racing driver, leukemia.
- Archduke Rudolf of Austria, 90, Austrian nobleman, youngest son of Emperor Charles I and Zita of Bourbon-Parma.
- John Shepherd-Barron, 84, British inventor, invented the Automatic Teller Machine.
- Bhairon Singh Shekhawat, 86, Indian politician, Vice-President (2002–2007), respiratory infection.

=== 16 ===
- Debbie Abono, 80, American band manager.
- Ronnie James Dio, 67, American heavy metal singer (Black Sabbath, Rainbow, Dio), stomach cancer.
- Frank Dye, 82, British sailor.
- Alfonso Escámez, 1st Marquess of Águilas, 94, Spanish banker.
- Hank Jones, 91, American jazz pianist.
- Oswaldo López Arellano, 88, Honduran politician, President (1963–1971, 1972–1975), prostate cancer.
- Ingvard Nielsen, 84, Danish Olympic athlete.
- Stephen Perry, 55, American television writer (ThunderCats, SilverHawks), homicide. (body discovered on this date)

=== 17 ===
- Víctor Selvino Arenhart, 61, Argentine Roman Catholic prelate, Bishop of Oberá (since 2009).
- Trevor Brissett, 49, English footballer (Port Vale), cancer.
- Judson Crews, 92, American poet.
- Ludwig von Friedeburg, 85, German politician and sociologist, Hesse Minister for Education (1969–1974).
- Richard Gregory, 86, British psychologist.
- Dorothy Kamenshek, 84, American baseball player (All-American Girls Professional Baseball League, 1943–1952).
- Yvonne Loriod, 86, French pianist, composer and teacher, widow of Olivier Messiaen.
- Mukhran Machavariani, 81, Georgian poet, heart attack.
- Vasil Manchenko, 79, Bulgarian Olympic basketball player.
- Rafael Nantes, 53, Filipino politician, helicopter crash.
- Khattiya Sawasdipol, 58, Thai army general and activist, advisor to the National United Front of Democracy Against Dictatorship (Red Shirts), shot.
- Bobbejaan Schoepen, 85, Belgian singer-songwriter and entrepreneur, cardiac arrest.
- Fritz Sennheiser, 98, German electrical engineer and entrepreneur, founder of Sennheiser.
- George Terlep, 87, American football player (Buffalo Bills) and head coach.
- Walasse Ting, 80, Chinese-born American visual artist.

=== 18 ===
- Iskender Alptekin, 48, Swiss politician, heart attack.
- Fedja Anzelewsky, 91, German art historian.
- Shusaku Arakawa, 73, Japanese artist and architect.
- Sheila Armstrong, 60, American Olympic fencer.
- Martha Bielish, 94, Canadian politician, Senator (1979–1990).
- Don Day, 86, Australian politician, New South Wales Minister for Agriculture (1978–1980).
- John Gooders, 73, British ornithologist.
- Karin Iten, 53, Swiss figure skater.
- Edoardo Sanguineti, 79, Italian poet, complications following abdominal aneurysm surgery.
- Peter Seaton, 67, American poet, influential in language poetry movement, apparent heart attack.
- Devendra Singh, 72, Indian-born American psychologist and educator.
- Snow Chief, 27, American Thoroughbred racehorse, euthanized.
- Willie Zapalac, 89, American football coach.

=== 19 ===
- Martin Cohan, 77, American television writer and producer, creator of Silver Spoons, Who's the Boss?, large cell lymphoma.
- Larry Dale, 87, American blues singer and guitarist.
- Pierre-Claver Zeng Ebome, 56, Gabonese politician and musician.
- Aleksandrs Golubovs, 50-51, Latvian politician, member of the Saeima (since 1995).
- Horácio Roque, 66, Portuguese financier, founder of Banco Internacional do Funchal, stroke.
- Moishe Rosen, 78, American Baptist minister, founder of Jews for Jesus, after long illness.
- Harry Vos, 63, Dutch footballer, cancer.

=== 20 ===
- Harry C. Aderholt, 90, American Air Force general.
- Herbert Eldemire, 79, Jamaican politician and medical doctor.
- Phill Hartsfield, 78, American knifemaker.
- Gesang Martohartono, 92, Indonesian singer-songwriter.
- Robert L. McNeil Jr., 94, American chemist and inventor, creator of paracetamol (acetaminophen), heart failure.
- Hugh Morris, 80, New Zealand businessman, founder of McDonald's New Zealand.
- Breandán Ó Buachalla, 74, Irish academic, Irish language scholar, heart attack.
- Acharya Ramamurti, 97, Indian social activist.
- Walter Rudin, 89, Austrian-born American mathematician, Parkinson's disease.
- Robert Tralins, 84, American author.
- Leonard Wolfson, Baron Wolfson, 82, British businessman, philanthropist and life peer.

=== 21 ===
- Adrian Cruickshank, 73, Australian politician, member of the New South Wales Legislative Assembly (1984–1999).
- Stan Jones, 78, American football player (Chicago Bears), member of Pro Football Hall of Fame, complications from a stroke.
- Anna-Lena Löfgren, 66, Swedish singer.
- Bill Long, 78, Irish writer and broadcaster, Ireland's longest surviving heart transplant patient.
- Will Munro, 35, Canadian artist, brain cancer.
- Howard Post, 83, American cartoonist and animator.
- Robert Gordon Rogers, 90, Canadian politician, Lieutenant Governor of British Columbia (1983–1988).
- Gerald Roush, 68, American Ferrari expert, heart attack.
- Saeed al-Masri, 54, Egyptian member of al-Qaeda, drone attack.
- John P. Scott, 76, American politician, member of the New Jersey Senate.
- Madan Tamang, 62, Nepali politician, President of Akhil Bharatiya Gorkha League, stabbed.
- Driek van Wissen, 66, Dutch poet, intracranial hemorrhage.

=== 22 ===
- Martin Gardner, 95, American mathematics and science author.
- Hasri Ainun Habibie, 72, Indonesian First Lady (1998–1999), ovarian cancer.
- Peter Hall, 88, New Zealand airman, World War II flying ace.
- Keith Jessop, 77, British deep sea diver and marine treasure hunter.
- Josef Koukl, 83, Czech Roman Catholic prelate, Bishop of Litoměřice (1989–2003).
- Michael Kuchwara, 63, American theater critic (Associated Press), idiopathic ischemic lung disease.
- Buz Lukens, 79, American politician, U.S. Representative for Ohio (1967–1971; 1987–1990), cancer.
- Lwandile Zwelenkosi Matanzima, 39, South African clan leader, ruler of Western Thembuland.
- Martin Mulloy, 58, Irish banjo player, drowning.
- Gane Todorovski, 81, Macedonian writer and academician.
- Veturi, 74, Indian poet and lyricist, cardiac arrest.
- Pierre Zimmer, 82, French actor and film director.

=== 23 ===
- Leonida Bagration of Mukhrani, 95, Russian Grand Duchess, last Romanov born in Russia.
- Beaver, 59, New Zealand jazz singer, sarcoma.
- Beto, 43, Portuguese singer, stroke.
- Héctor Costa, 80, Uruguayan basketball player, Olympic bronze medalist (1952 and 1956 Summer Olympics).
- Gregory Evans, 96, Canadian jurist, Chief Justice of the Supreme Court of Ontario (1976–1985).
- David Ginsburg, 98, American lawyer and political insider, heart failure.
- José Lima, 37, Dominican baseball player, heart attack.
- Ashot Mkhitaryan, 51, Armenian weightlifting and television personality, heart attack.
- Simon Monjack, 40, British screenwriter, suspected heart attack.
- Marianna O'Gallagher, 81, Canadian Irish Quebecer historian, lung cancer.
- Eva Ostwalt, 108, German-born American Holocaust survivor.
- Irwin Rosten, 85, American documentary filmmaker (The Incredible Machine, 1975), after short illness.
- Wee Willie Webber, 80, American radio and television personality, heart attack.

=== 24 ===
- Ray Alan, 79, British ventriloquist, respiratory failure.
- Walter Arnold Baker, 73, American lawyer and politician, cancer.
- Virendra Bhatia, 63, Indian politician, after short illness.
- Tony Bentley-Buckle, 88, Kenyan Olympic sailor.
- Tapen Chatterjee, 72, Indian actor (Goopy Gyne Bagha Byne), cardiac arrest.
- Maria di Gerlando, 84, American operatic soprano.
- Paul Gray, 38, American heavy metal bassist (Slipknot), accidental fentanyl and morphine overdose.
- Alejandro López de Haro, 61, Venezuelan photographer, writer and stock broker, complications from surgery.
- Raymond V. Haysbert, 90, American business executive and civil rights leader, member of Tuskegee Airmen, heart failure.
- Baby Islam, 82, Bangladeshi cinematographer.
- Kambozia Jamali, 71, Iranian Olympic footballer.
- Morrie Martin, 87, American baseball player, lung cancer.
- Rogelio Martínez, 91, American baseball player (Washington Senators).
- Petr Muk, 45, Czech pop singer.
- Barbara New, 87, British actress (Oh, Doctor Beeching!, You Rang, M'Lord?).
- Steve New, 50, British guitarist, cancer.
- Eugenia Paul, 75, American actress (Zorro).
- Katherine Reback, 59, American screenwriter (Fools Rush In), complications from cancer.
- Abdolhamid Rigi, 30-31, Iranian militant, execution by hanging.
- Anneliese Rothenberger, 85, German opera singer.

=== 25 ===
- Alexander Belostenny, 51, Ukrainian basketball player, lung cancer.
- Clifford Grodd, 86, American clothier, President and CEO of Paul Stuart, cancer.
- Arthur Herzog, 83, American writer.
- Alan Hickinbotham, 84, Australian football player and businessman.
- Michael H. Jordan, 73, American business executive, complications of cancer.
- Erih Koš, 97, Serbian writer and translator.
- Silvius Magnago, 96, Italian politician, Governor of South Tyrol (1960–1989).
- Robert Muczynski, 81, American composer of classical music.
- Siphiwo Ntshebe, 35, South African opera singer, meningitis.
- David Parker, 51, British swimmer, heart attack.
- Gabriel Vargas, 95, Mexican cartoonist.

=== 26 ===
- Leo Canjels, 77, Dutch footballer.
- Jean Constantin, 82, Romanian actor, natural causes.
- Marie Corridon, 80, American swimmer, gold medalist (1948 Summer Olympics).
- Jesse Hockett, 26, American sprint car racer, electrocution.
- John P. Lewis, 89, American economist, expert on economic aid.
- Art Linkletter, 97, Canadian-born American radio and television personality (House Party, People are Funny), natural causes.
- Judy Lynn, 74, American country music singer, heart failure.
- Sir Christopher Moran, 54, British air force officer, Air Chief Marshal of RAF, suspected heart failure.
- Kieran Phelan, 60, Irish politician, suspected heart attack.
- Pat Stevens, 64, American actress and voice actress (M*A*S*H, Scooby-Doo and Scrappy-Doo), breast cancer.

=== 27 ===
- Louise Arnold, 87, American baseball player (AAGPBL)
- Harry Brown Bainbridge III, 70, American bishop, lung cancer and heart complications.
- John William Finn, 100, American naval officer, oldest living Medal of Honor recipient.
- Jerzy Gryt, 88, Polish Olympic wrestler.
- Peter J. Hall, 84, British-born American costume designer (Dallas Opera).
- Yvonne Howell, 104, American actress.
- Jackson Kaujeua, 56, Namibian musician, composer and gospel singer, kidney disease.
- Peter Keefe, 57, American animation producer and executive (Voltron, Denver, the Last Dinosaur), throat cancer.
- Roman Kozak, 52, Russian theatre actor and director, after long illness.
- Payut Ngaokrachang, 81, Thai cartoonist and animator.
- Thomas Whisenhant, 63, American serial killer, execution by lethal injection.
- Reg White, 74, British Olympic gold medal-winning (1976) sailor.

=== 28 ===
- Eddie Barth, 78, American actor (Simon & Simon, The Amityville Horror, Fame), heart failure.
- Henry Bramwell, 90, American federal judge.
- Slim Bryant, 101, American country singer-songwriter.
- Gary Coleman, 42, American actor (Diff'rent Strokes), intracranial hemorrhage.
- Sir Hugh Ford, 96, British engineer
- Ted Innes, 85, Australian politician, member of the Australian House of Representatives (1972–1983).
- Robert Middlemiss, 75, Canadian engineer and politician.
- Osama Anwar Okasha, 68, Egyptian screenwriter and journalist.
- David Sanger, 63, British organist.
- Leslie Scalapino, 65, American poet, publisher and playwright.
- Torvald Högström, 84, Finnish Olympic cyclist.

=== 29 ===
- Akinpelu Oludele Adesola, 82, Nigerian academic.
- Adrian Freeman, 24, Irish hurler (Mayo), traffic collision.
- Dennis Hopper, 74, American actor (Speed, Blue Velvet) and film director (Easy Rider), prostate cancer.
- Paul Müller, 69, German biologist.
- Jeriome Robertson, 33, American baseball player (Houston Astros, Cleveland Indians), motorcycle collision.
- Donald L. Staheli, 78, American Mormon leader, general authority of The Church of Jesus Christ of Latter-day Saints.
- Randolph Stow, 74, Australian writer, liver cancer.

=== 30 ===
- José Amedo, 91, Spanish Olympic shooter.
- Hanji Aoki, 94, Japanese sports official, heart failure.
- Colm Callan, 87, Irish rugby player (1948 Grand Slam), after long illness.
- Yuri Chesnokov, 77, Russian Olympic gold medal-winning (1964) volleyball player.
- Aryeh Eliav, 88, Israeli politician, after long illness.
- Dame Pat Evison, 85, New Zealand actress.
- Bruce Harris, 55, British executive director of Casa Alianza (1989–2004), pancreatic cancer.
- Lester Johnson, 91, American figurative expressionist artist.
- Peter Orlovsky, 76, American poet, lung cancer.
- Joan Rhodes, 89, British actress and entertainer.
- Jeanne Robinson, 62, American dancer and novelist, wife of Spider Robinson, biliary tract cancer.
- Dufferin Roblin, 92, Canadian politician, Premier of Manitoba (1958–1967), Senator (1978–1992).
- Vera Beaudin Saeedpour, 80, American Kurdish scholar, founder of the Kurdish Heritage Foundation of America, heart attack.
- Robert O. Smith, 67, American voice actor (Dragon Ball Z, InuYasha, Transformers: Cybertron).
- Brian Turner, 58, Australian footballer, cancer.
- Rudi Vis, 69, British politician, MP for Finchley and Golders Green (1997–2010), cancer.
- Tobi Wong, 35, Canadian designer, suicide by hanging.
- Ali-Ollie Woodson, 58, American soul singer (The Temptations), leukemia.

=== 31 ===
- Louise Bourgeois, 98, French-born American artist and sculptor.
- Uzra Butt, 93, Indian-born Pakistani actress, after long illness.
- Emil Clade, 94, German Luftwaffe fighter ace. (exact date of death unknown)
- Boyd Converse, 78, American college football coach.
- Brian Duffy, 76, British photographer, degenerative lung disease.
- William A. Fraker, 86, American cinematographer (Bullitt, Rosemary's Baby, WarGames), cancer.
- Chris Haney, 59, Canadian co-inventor of Trivial Pursuit, after long illness.
- Rubén Juárez, 62, Argentine singer-songwriter and bandoneónist, prostate cancer.
- Benjamin Lees, 86, American composer of classical music, heart failure.
- Merata Mita, 68, New Zealand filmmaker.
- Basilio Santiago Romero, 82, Puerto Rican politician, Comptroller (1971–1977).
- Jack Volrich, 82, Canadian politician, Mayor of Vancouver (1976–1980), kidney failure.
- Donald Windham, 89, American novelist.
- Participants of the Gaza Freedom Flotilla shot dead by Israeli forces:
  - İbrahim Bilgen, 61, Turkish politician and engineer.
  - Furkan Doğan, 18, American student.
  - Cevdet Kılıçlar, 38, Turkish journalist and photographer.
