= Aliabbas =

Aliabbas is a given name. Notable people with the name include:

- Aliabbas Rzazade (born 1998), Azerbaijani wrestler
- Aliabbas Salahzade (born 1979), Azerbaijani politician
