= Millsian =

Millsian may refer to:

- A molecular modeling program from Blacklight Power
- The philosophy of John Stuart Mill
