= Jabbarov =

Jabbarov is a surname. Notable people with the surname include:

- Faig Jabbarov (born 1972), Azerbaijani footballer
- Mikayil Jabbarov (born 1976), Azerbaijani politician
- Rauf Jabbarov (1935–2010), Azerbaijani boxing manager
