= Libyan Civil Aviation Authority =

Regulatory agency in Libya

The Libyan Civil Aviation Authority (LYCAA, Arabic: مصلحة الطيران المدني, previously Arabic: سلطة الطيران المدني الليبية "Libyan Arab Jamahiriya Civil Aviation Authority") is the civil aviation authority of Libya. Its head office is at Tripoli International Airport in Tripoli.

It also serves as the aircraft accident investigation authority of the country.

== See also ==
- Afriqiyah Airways Flight 771
