= International Journal of Kurdish Studies =

The International Journal of Kurdish Studies (ISSN 1073-6697) is an academic journal published by the Kurdish Library, and was edited by Vera Beaudin Saeedpour. It publishes scholarly articles about Kurdish culture, literature, and history. It was founded in 1986 as Kurdish Times before getting its current title after volume 4.

International Journal of Kurdish Studies should not be confused with Peeter's Journal of Kurdish Studies (print ISSN 1370-7205, electronic ISSN 1783-1539), or Transnational Press London's Kurdish Studies (print ISSN 2051-4883, electronic ISSN 2051-4891) journal.

== See also ==
- A Modern History of the Kurds by David McDowall
