= Aliabbas Salahzade =

Azerbaijani politician (born 1979)

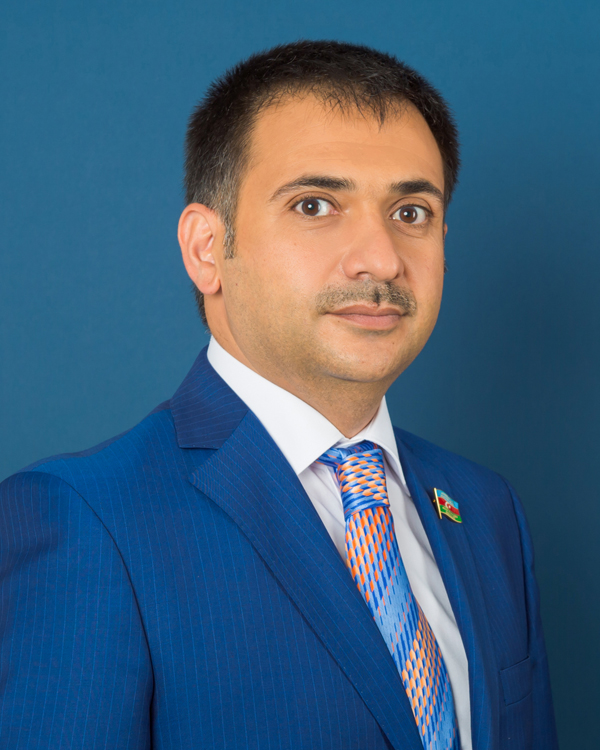

Member of the National Assembly of Azerbaijan
- In office 10 March 2020 – 23 September 2024
- Constituency: Sabunchu District

Mayor of Bilgeh
- In office 1999–2000

Personal details
- Born: 22 January 1979 (age 47) Bilgah, Azerbaijan SSR, Soviet Union
- Party: New Azerbaijan Party

Aliabbas Salahzadeh (born January 22, 1979, Bilgah) is a deputy of the 6th convocation of the National Assembly of the Republic of Azerbaijan and a lawyer.

== Biography ==
- Aliabbas Salahzade was born on January 22, 1979, in Bilgah. He graduated from secondary school No. 142 in Bilgah in 1995. He studied at Azerbaijan International University and later transferred to the Faculty of International Law at the National Aviation Academy of Azerbaijan, where he graduated as a lawyer.
- He completed military service in Azerbaijan from 2002 to 2003. Afterward, he worked in the Sabunchu District Bilgah Municipality and was re-elected as mayor by municipal members.
- In 2004, he began his master's studies at the Human Rights Institute of the Azerbaijan National Academy of Sciences. During his postgraduate studies, he published scientific articles on international organizations' roles in local governance and municipal development in Azerbaijan.
- In 2006, he was appointed head of the education, health, and culture department in the Sabunchu District Executive Authority.
- In 2009, he earned a doctorate in legal sciences from the High Certification Commission under the President of Azerbaijan.
- Since 2010, he has held the rank of First-Class Officer.

== Political Activity ==
- During his student years, he was elected as a municipal member of Bilgah Municipality in Sabunchu District. In 1999, he was appointed mayor by municipal members' recommendation.
- Until 2020, he worked as the head of the socio-political and humanitarian affairs department in the Sabunchu District Executive Authority.
- In 2020, he was elected as a member of the National Assembly from the 27th Sabunchu Second Constituency in the 6th convocation.
- He is a member of the National Assembly’s Natural Resources, Energy and Ecology Committee, as well as the Regional Affairs Committee.
- He serves as the chairman of the Azerbaijan-Djibouti Interparliamentary Relations Working Group.
- He has been a member of the New Azerbaijan Party since 1995.
- From 2006 to 2011, he served as a board member of the YAP Sabunchu District Youth Union and was chairman of the first party organization in Bilgah.
