= Maris Stella School =

Maris Stella School is a private Roman Catholic day school for girls from three + to eighteen years old (grades 000-12 or pre-primary, primary and secondary phases), located on the Berea in Durban, KwaZulu-Natal, South Africa.

It was founded on May 22, 1899, by the Holy Family Sisters as a boarding school. It declared a non-racial policy in 1974. It has c. 830 pupils. The principal is Stephen Ireland

The name of the school, Maris Stella, is Latin, and means Star of the sea. The school motto is Suspice confide, which is Latin, and means Look up and trust.

The school's official newsletter is called The Anchor.

== Notable alumnae ==
- Diana Napier, film actress
- Bree O'Mara, novelist, ballet dancer, TV producer and air hostess
- Nandipha Khubone, actress
