= Afriqiyah Airways Flight 771 =

2010 aircraft accident in Libya

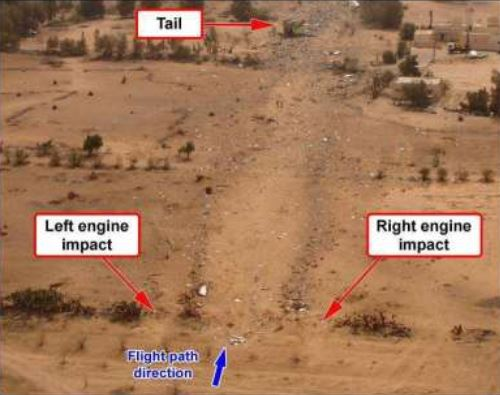
- Aerial view of the crash site

Accident
- Date: 12 May 2010
- Summary: Controlled flight into terrain in low visibility due to spatial disorientation and pilot error
- Site: Near Tripoli International Airport, Tripoli, Libya; 32°39′41″N 13°7′9″E

Aircraft
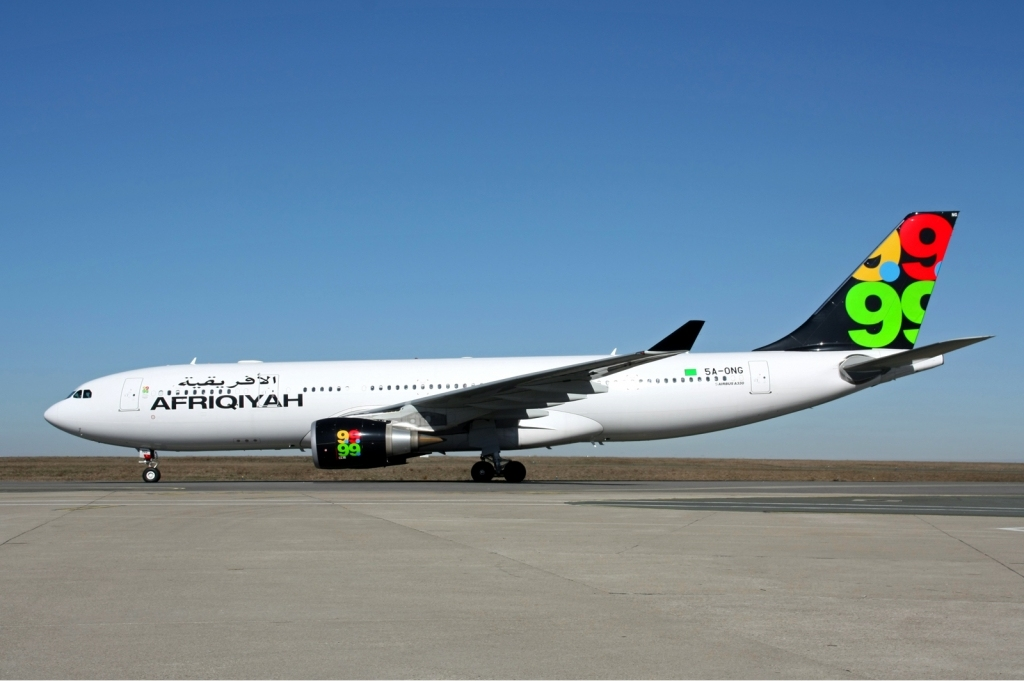
- 5A-ONG, the aircraft involved in the accident, seen in March 2010
- Aircraft type: Airbus A330-202
- Operator: Afriqiyah Airways
- IATA flight No.: 8U771
- ICAO flight No.: AAW771
- Call sign: AFRIQIYAH 771
- Registration: 5A-ONG
- Flight origin: O. R. Tambo International Airport, Johannesburg, South Africa
- Destination: Tripoli International Airport, Tripoli, Libya
- Occupants: 104
- Passengers: 93
- Crew: 11
- Fatalities: 103
- Injuries: 1
- Survivors: 1

Afriqiyah Airways Flight 771 was a scheduled international Afriqiyah Airways passenger flight from Johannesburg, South Africa to Tripoli, Libya. On 12 May 2010 at about 06:01 (04:01 UTC) while on approach to Tripoli International Airport, the aircraft operating the flight, an Airbus A330, crashed about 1,200 metres (3,900 ft; 1,300 yd) short of the runway. Of the 104 passengers and crew on board, 103 were killed. The sole survivor was a 9-year-old Dutch boy.

The crash of Flight 771 was the deadliest aviation disaster in Libya since the crash of Libyan Arab Airlines Flight 1103 in 1992. This was also the third hull-loss of an Airbus A330 involving fatalities, occurring eleven months after the crash of Air France Flight 447. The crash was also the first fatal accident in the operational history of Afriqiyah Airways.

The investigation, led by the Libyan Civil Aviation Authority, concluded that the crash was caused by pilot error. Following a series of misunderstandings between the pilots, the flight failed to stabilise its approach, causing the already fatigued crew to execute a missed approach. While initiating the go-around, they suffered somatogravic illusion. They then applied nose-down input at low altitude and caused the aircraft to slam onto terrain.

== Background ==
=== Aircraft ===
The aircraft involved was an Airbus A330-202 registered as 5A-ONG with serial number 1024, fitted with two General Electric CF6-80E1A4 engines. It entered service with Afriqiyah Airways on 15 September 2009. At the time of the accident, it had logged approximately 2,175 hours total flying time in 572 take-off and landing cycles. It was configured for a capacity of 230 passengers and 13 crew, including 30 business class seats and 200 economy class seats.

=== Crew ===
The flight crew consisted of:

- The captain was 57-year-old Yousef al-Saadi (Note: Arabic: يوسف الساعدي) (pilot monitoring,PM). He was hired by Afriqiyah Airways in 2007 and had logged 17,016 flight hours, 516 of which were logged on the Airbus A330.
- The first officer was 42-year-old Tareq Abu-Shawashi (Note: Arabic: طارق أبو الشواشي) (pilot flying, PF). He had 4,216 flight hours, including 516 hours logged on the Airbus A330.
- The relief first officer was 37-year-old Nazem al-Tarhuni (Note: Arabic: ناظم الترهوني). He had 1,866 flight hours, 516 of which were logged on the Airbus A330.

All three crew members had logged 516 hours on the Airbus A330.

== Accident ==
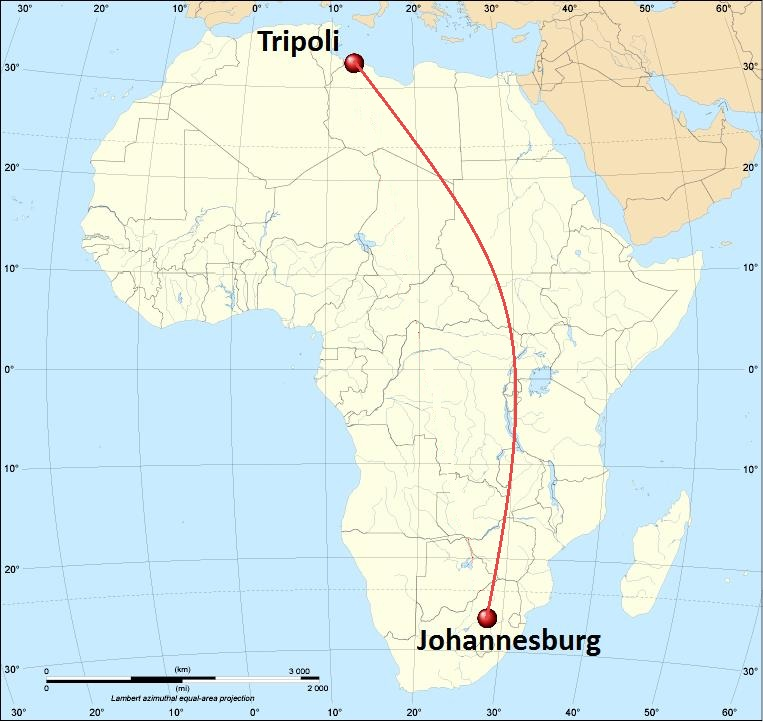
The route of Afriqiyah Airways Flight 771

Flight 771 was an international long-haul flight that originated at O. R. Tambo International Airport in South Africa's largest city of Johannesburg to Tripoli International Airport in the Libyan capital of Tripoli. There were 93 passengers and 11 crew members on board. Most of the passengers were Dutch citizens returning from holiday in South Africa. After arriving in Libya, the majority of the passengers would have boarded two other aircraft, one of which was bound to Düsseldorf and the other to Brussels. On this flight, al-Saadi was the monitoring pilot, while Abu-Shawashi was in charge of the aircraft controls.

=== Approach ===
Flight 771 entered Libyan airspace at around 5 a.m. The crew immediately sought information about the weather and asked for clearance for an approach to Tripoli, which was approved by the ATC. The weather was reported as good, with calm wind and visibility up to 6 kilometres (20,000 ft). They were cleared for descent to 9,000 feet and continued their approach to the airport.

With several minutes left until the flight's arrival at Tripoli, the crew started their approach briefing. Since Tripoli was the home base for Afriqiyah Airways, the crew had been familiarised with their approach and thus decided to end the briefing earlier, only commenting on several things, including the active runway, the locator beacon, and the aircraft's faulty autobrake system. The crew then performed the approach checklist very briefly and tried to stabilise the approach.

Approximately 8 nautical miles from the airport, al-Saadi stated that they should do the "NAV approach". Afterwards, Captain al-Saadi asked the first officer to track the "FPA", which would show the aircraft's relative position to the airport's navigation. When it was 7 nautical miles from the extended runway centreline, the aircraft was established for an approach. At 5:29, al-Saadi contacted Tripoli ATC, which cleared the flight to continue to Tripoli and to report the runway in sight.

According to the approach charts, using a non-precision approach, the crew had to locate the airport's locator, denoted as beacon "TW", before they could be approved for landing. The flight crew discussed which runway approach procedure they would use. When the landing procedure was selected, Abu-Shawashi immediately activated the procedure, and the aircraft began its final descent. When Abu-Shawashi was trying to confirm said procedure to the captain, a call from another Afriqiyah Airways pilot, who had just landed in Tripoli, was received. The pilot alerted the flight crew of Flight 771 that the weather had deteriorated and the airport was covered with mists. While al-Saadi was preoccupied with radio communication, Abu-Shawashi decided to continue the procedure. The aircraft then passed the beacon at 1,000 ft and the crew began searching for the runway.

The flight eventually reached the decision altitude of 720 feet. By this time, the crew had to decide on whether to continue or discontinue the approach. Despite having no runway in sight, al-Saadi commanded to continue the descent. At 6:01 local time, the aircraft had descended to 280 feet (85 m) above ground when the terrain awareness and warning system sounded a "too low terrain" alarm in the cockpit. Al-Saadi, who was startled by the warning, frantically ordered Abu-Shawashi to do a go-around. The autopilot was immediately turned off and their landing attempt was abandoned.

=== Go-around and crash ===
Following al-Saadi's order to go-around, First Officer Abu-Shawashi immediately set the thrust levers to TO/GA power and the pitch was raised to around 12.3° nose up. The landing gear and the flaps were retracted. Al-Saadi, still surprised by the sudden decision to abort the approach, failed to conduct the necessary callouts for the go-around, prompting Abu-Shawashi to question him.

Just seconds after disengaging the autopilot, Abu-Shawashi suddenly made a nose-down input. During this time, he called out "flaps" as his flight display showed that the aircraft was about to reach excessive airspeed. Instead of correcting the aircraft's attitude, he kept his attention to the flaps, apparently becoming fixated as he had been involved in a previous overspeed incident in Tripoli. Captain al-Saadi retracted the flaps and informed the ATC that they were going to make a missed approach. The aircraft was going down as First Officer Abu-Shawashi kept the same nose-down input.

Al-Saadi, in an attempt to assist his co-pilot, remarkably made the same nose-down input, albeit not significant enough for the dual input warning to kick in. As the aircraft kept hurtling towards the ground, the ground proximity warning system sounded "too low terrain", "sink rate", and "pull up" alarms as the aircraft lost more height. Realizing that the aircraft would need to decrease its speed, Abu-Shawashi finally made a nose-up input. He, however, was still not aware that the aircraft was losing altitude, and instead was focusing on their preparation for another approach attempt.

Without warning, al-Saadi took over the control from Abu-Shawashi by pushing the side-stick priority button. He maintained a full nose-down input, while Abu-Shawashi pulled his sidestick to raise the pitch. Due to Airbus aircraft adding up side-stick inputs, his inputs ended up cancelling out the other pilot's inputs. While the aircraft was descending rapidly, the pilots finally saw the ground, which was approaching rapidly. Two seconds before impact, al-Saadi finally made a full nose-up input. With only 180 feet (55 m) left between the aircraft and the ground, recovery was impossible.

Two seconds later, the aircraft crashed into the ground at a speed of 262 knots (302 mph; 485 km/h), about 1,200 metres (3,900 ft; 1,300 yd) short of Runway 09, outside the airport perimeter. The aircraft was destroyed by the impact and post-crash fire.

== Passengers ==
The passengers aboard Flight 771 were of various nationalities. All of the eleven crew members were Libyans. At least three passengers, one from Ireland and two from United Kingdom, held dual citizenship. The following list reflects the airline's passenger nationality count of the victims. The airline released the manifest on the morning of 15 May 2010; the airline sent the list to several related embassies.

Nationality	Fatalities		Survivors		Total
Nationality	Passengers	Crew	Passengers	Crew	Total
Netherlands	67	–	1	–	68
Libya	2	11	–	–	13
South Africa	13*	–	–	–	13*
Belgium	4	–	–	–	4
Austria	2	–	–	–	2
Germany	2	–	–	–	2
Finland	1	–	–	–	1
France	1	–	–	–	1
Philippines	1	–	–	–	1
United Kingdom	1	–	–	–	1
United States	1	–	–	–	1
Zimbabwe	1	–	–	–	1
Total	92	11	1	0	104

* one South African passport holder, Bree O'Mara, had dual South African and Irish citizenships.

The sole survivor was a 9-year-old Dutch boy, Ruben van Assouw, from Tilburg, who was returning from a safari with his parents and brother (all of whom died in the accident). He was taken to Sabia'a Hospital, 30 kilometres (19 mi; 16 nmi) south-east of Tripoli and later transferred to Al-Khadhra Hospital, Tripoli, to undergo surgery for multiple fractures in both legs. Dutch Foreign Ministry spokesman Ad Meijer said the child had no life-threatening injuries. Saif al-Islam Gaddafi and Captain Sabri Shadi, the head of Afriqiyah Airways, visited the boy while he was hospitalised in Libya. On 15 May, he was transferred by air ambulance to Eindhoven in the Netherlands. The boy was accompanied on the flight by his paternal aunt and uncle, who later gained custody of him.

Of the passengers, 42 were to continue to Düsseldorf, 32 to Brussels, 7 to London, and 1 to Paris. Eleven of the passengers had Libya as their final destination. Of the 71 passengers identified as Dutch by the Dutch Ministry of Foreign Affairs, 38 were travelling with the Stip travel agency, 24 were travelling with the Kras travel agency, and 9, including the survivor, had their tickets booked independently. One of the Dutch victims was Joëlle van Noppen, singer in the former Dutch girl group WOW!.

South Africa confirmed that at least nine of its citizens were on board Flight 771. Among them was Frans Dreyer, the brother of MP Anchen Dreyer.

On the evening of 12 May 2010, the Irish Department of Foreign Affairs confirmed that one of its passport holders was on the plane, novelist Bree O'Mara.

== Response ==
During the accident, the aircraft damaged a house on the ground. The homeowner, his wife, and their five children escaped unharmed. The house and a nearby mosque were scheduled to be demolished as part of the airport expansion plans.

After hearing the news of the crash, the Dutch government quickly established a crisis team. A flight carrying officials from the Ministry of Foreign Affairs and personnel of the Dutch National Forensic Investigation Team would be flown on the next day. Netherlands gendarmerie, Royal Marechaussee, were also deployed to the crash site. The first body of a non-Libyan passenger was repatriated to the Netherlands on 27 May 2010. On 15 June, all of the bodies had been identified and repatriated to their respective countries. Libyan authorities then began clearing the accident site on 21 June.

Afriqiyah Airways issued a statement saying that relatives of the victims who wished to visit Libya would be transported and accommodated at Afriqiyah's expense. The Libyan authorities relaxed certain passport restrictions and guaranteed the granting of visas. By 15 May 2010 the airline opened the Family Assistance Centre in a hotel in Tripoli to care for family members and relatives of crash victims who were visiting Libya. The executive team of Afriqiyah, including the CEO and the chairperson of the board, met family members at the hotel. Some family members wanted to visit the crash site; they travelled to the site and placed flowers there.

Queen Beatrix of the Netherlands expressed her shock at hearing the news. The President of South Africa, Jacob Zuma, also offered his condolences. A national mourning was declared and flags were flown at half mast. As the crash happened during the campaigning season for the parliamentary elections, all events related to campaigning were suspended.

The Dutch Interior Ministry announced that a dedicated website for the families had been established, stating that the purpose of the website was to provide additional legal and moral support to the relatives. Relatives could receive approximately 20,000 euros in advance as preliminary compensation, which would be provided by Afriqiyah Airlines.

On 30 June, a national commemoration was held in Dr. Anton Philips Hall in The Hague. The service was attended by relatives of the victims, government officials and members of the Dutch Royal Family, including Queen Beatrix. Concerts and poem readings were conducted while victims' names were read out one by one. The memorial was televised on live TV. A national minute of silence was also observed during the service. The then-Prime Minister of the Netherlands, Jan Peter Balkenende, expressed his deepest sympathy to the families, later thanking the Libyan authorities for their good cooperation.

=== Controversy ===
The conduct of the press during the crash was openly criticised by the Dutch government and public due to what they considered blatant disregard of the privacy of the victims. Following the discovery that Ruben was the only survivor of the crash, the press immediately followed him. After waking up from his intensive care, Ruben reportedly was phoned by a journalist from the Dutch newspaper De Telegraaf. Ruben was audibly upset at the time of the interview and was still traumatised from the crash. In the Netherlands, the revelation sparked controversy and drew condemnations from government officials. André Rouvoet, caretaker of the Minister for Youth and Family Policy, called De Telegraaf's action "shameless," stating, "How dare you?!" on Twitter. Secretary-General of the Ministry of Foreign Affairs, Ed Kronenburg, called the interview "reprehensible," adding that he wanted to discuss with the hospital reports that journalists were able to gain access to Ruben's bed. The newspaper eventually issued an apology to the public, stating that they never intended to abuse Ruben's situation.

The same complaint was also made by relatives of other victims regarding the conduct of other press. Mayor of Roermond, Rianne Donders, whose son was killed in the crash, admitted that families of the victims had to meet in secret to prevent the media from following them. Their attempts, however, failed as the press managed to find the place of their meeting. One of the journalists could be seen lying in bushes to get photographs.

Libyan media, meanwhile, accused authorities of excessive use of force and assaulting the press. One of the reporters claimed that, during Ruben's departure from Libya, the journalists were assaulted by doctors who were handling Ruben, inflicting injuries to one of them. The group accused the authorities of unequal treatment, claiming that Western press were allowed to take photos, record, and interview Ruben.

Following the commotion, Prime Minister Jan Peter Balkenende called the media to grant the relatives peace as they were dealing with their grief and loss. He eventually extended his sympathy to Ruben's family and added that the government would do everything to support the families of the victims. On 11 June, Ruben's family was granted a private memorial in Tilburg for the deceased members. The memorial was attended by the mayor of Tilburg, and 1,200 guests.

The Netherlands Journalist Council issued a full ruling on the aspects of reporting in regard to the privacy of the relatives of the victims. Procedural changes in reporting and covering the victims of accidents would be published in September 2010.

== Investigation ==
The Libyan Civil Aviation Authority (LYCAA) opened an investigation into the accident. Airbus stated that it would provide full technical assistance to the authorities investigating the crash, and would do so via the French Bureau of Enquiry and Analysis for Civil Aviation Safety (BEA). The South African Civil Aviation Authority sent a team to assist with the investigation. The BEA assisted in the investigation with an initial team of two investigators, accompanied by five advisors from Airbus. The Dutch Safety Board (Dutch: Onderzoeksraad voor Veiligheid, literally "Investigation Council for Safety") sent an observer. The flight recorders were recovered and sent to Paris for analysis soon after the incident.

During the final approach and up to the moment of the accident the pilot had not reported any problems to the control tower. The weather at the time of the crash was low wind, marginal visibility, and unlimited ceiling.^{[A]} The main runway of the airport (Runway 09/27) is 3,600 metres (11,800 ft; 3,900 yd) long. Libyan Transport Minister Mohammed Ali Zidan ruled out terrorism as a cause.

Authorities reviewed the recordings made by the Flight Data Recorder. In August 2010, it was reported that preliminary investigations were complete. There was no evidence of any technical problems nor was there any fuel shortage. No technical or medical problems had been reported by the crew and they had not requested any assistance.

The outbreak of the Libyan civil war caused the investigation to be suspended for at least two years. The Netherlands House of Representatives urged the Ministry of Foreign Affairs to send a letter regarding the resumption of the investigation. The result of the investigation had been planned to be published by the end of 2012. The Libyan government later asked for another 6 months. The Dutch government offered assistance, but it was refused by Libyan authorities, claiming that Libya would be able to finish the report by themselves.

=== Conduct of approach ===
Flight 771 used a non-precision approach to Tripoli, meaning that the pilots would be provided with lateral guidance to the airport but not vertical guidance. To do this approach, pilots would be obliged to rely on ground beacons and other aircraft equipment, including VOR and DME. They would then need to discuss their approach thoroughly in order to reach the airport safely. One of the approach methods would be the "common managed guidance" mode, in which the crew would need to do a continuous descent until they reach the minimum decision altitude before continuing to the runway threshold. The technique was preferred by pilots since the mode took the least workload. In "selected guidance," the crew would conduct a rapid descent, relying on a glideslope until the aircraft reached a certain altitude. Using this mode would require close attention.

In Flight 771, as both pilots were familiar with the airport, due to Tripoli International Airport being designated as the main hub of Afriqiyah Airways, they felt that they didn't need to do a thorough briefing and thus only briefed their approach minimally.

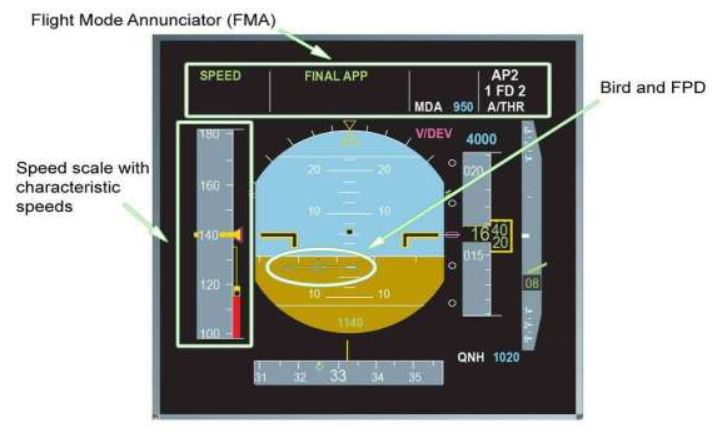
Flight Path Angle or "bird", seen on the Primary Flight Display (PFD)

During the approach, al-Saadi ordered Abu-Shawashi to "track the flight path angle," probably referring to the "bird" in the primary flight display, which would show the aircraft's position more clearly and would assist them with the non-precision approach. Al-Saadi wanted to do a "common managed guidance" approach, which would make their approach easier. Unfortunately, the term that he used was non-standard and ambiguous, though Abu-Shawashi responded as if he understood it.

However, when Abu-Shawashi decided to conduct the procedure, he actually had misunderstood the order, as he thought that al-Saadi was asking him to change the method of their approach. As a result of the misunderstanding, Abu-Shawashi changed their approach to the "selected guidance". While trying to confirm this with al-Saadi, the captain suddenly received a call from another Afriqiyah Airways pilot, who referred him by his first name. Al-Saadi immediately paid attention to the radio communication instead of his first officer. Thinking that the change of plan had already been confirmed, the aircraft was put into a descent by Abu-Shawashi.

Eventually, the three-degree glideslope angle, which was used in the "selected guidance" mode, was called out by Abu-Shawashi, and the aircraft descended way short of the beacon "TW." Al-Saadi, who was still busy with communications, didn't monitor the flight parameters as he believed that the aircraft was following the common managed guidance, where the approach would be assisted with automation and consequently the final path to the runway would be secured enough by the flight system.

When the aircraft reached the decision altitude, Abu-Shawashi asked the captain whether they should continue the descent, to which al-Saadi responded with "continue." Flight 771 then flew below the minimum decision altitude of 420 ft. They began searching the runway, but due to the bad visibility, they couldn't find the runway. Feeling uncertain, Abu-Shawashi asked whether they should abandon the approach. A few seconds later, the TAWS "TOO LOW TERRAIN" warning blared, taking both crew members by surprise. Startled by this, al-Saadi asked to go around.

The thrust was put into TO/GA powers; however, the nose was only raised for a shallow angle of 12.3 degrees. After briefly climbing for several hundred feet, Abu-Shawashi made a nose-down input, which caused the aircraft to descend. He then tried to raise the nose up to prepare for another approach, but al-Saadi decided to take over the control by pressing the priority button and made a maximum nose-down input long enough to cause the alarm to warn them of their impending collision. The dual input warning would have warned them of both pilots' conflicting commands, but since the priority was lower than the GPWS warning, the pilots didn't notice them. The aircraft kept being put into a descent until the pilots realised that they were going to crash.

=== Crew's mental state ===
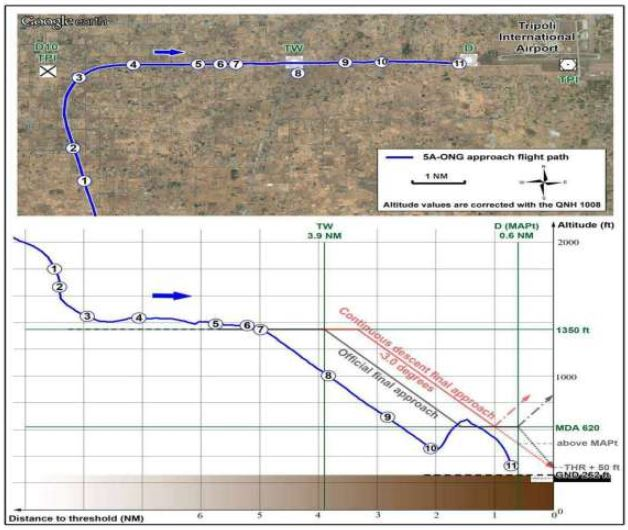
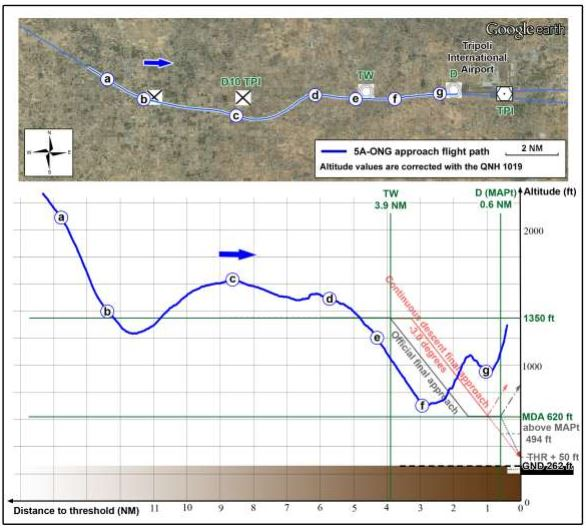
Approach profile of Flight 771 on the day of the accident (left) and on 28 April 2010 (right).

It was likely that the pilots were tired during the approach, which caused their decision-making skill to be impaired. The flight to Tripoli was a long-haul flight, and the same crew had taken two consecutive night flights prior. Despite their 15-hour rest beforehand, they were likely to be fatigued due to the long flight. The flight also arrived in Tripoli in the early morning, when people would normally have fallen asleep.

In the early approach phase, the pilots decided not to conduct a thorough briefing as they were already familiar with the airport's environment. The flight recording, however, indicated that both of them were ill-prepared with the approach, considering the multiple misunderstandings that happened in-flight, even though they were initially on the same page regarding the method that they were going to take. While Abu-Shawashi was trying to confirm this change of approach to the captain, an interruption was made from another aircraft. Instead of trying to confirm again after the end of the conversation, he assumed that al-Saadi had confirmed the change.

Abu-Shawashi likely had miscalculated the distance between his aircraft and the airport's DME, causing him to initiate the descent earlier than expected. Meanwhile, al-Saadi was still preoccupied with the relay from his fellow pilot and, as a result, didn't notice that it had descended earlier than it was supposed to. This resulted in the flight crew not being able to find the runway. When the aircraft reached the airport's decision altitude, al-Saadi was pretty sure that they would find the runway right away, even though he had not acquired any visual with the runway. As the TAWS "TOO LOW TERRAIN" blared, al-Saadi got startled and immediately said "go-around" three times in quick succession.

Following al-Saadi's order, the thrust levers were pushed to the takeoff/go-around position and the pitch was raised. However, it was not raised high enough, being only 12.3 degrees from the recommended 15 degrees. Combined with the high energy from the large thrust power, this caused the pilots to get pushed back into their seat significantly, causing a false sensation in their head that they had pitched up excessively, a phenomenon known as somatogravic illusion. Realising this, Abu-Shawashi immediately made a nose-down input.

The issue should have been resolved by al-Saadi, whose job during the flight was supposed to monitor the instruments, which would have shown that the aircraft was flying towards the ground. Instead, Captain al-Saadi made the same input. He did monitor the deck, but he focused his attention on the airspeed as it began to approach the overspeed limit. After calling out to the first officer for their speed, both pilots became fixated on it. This was likely caused by their already fatigued condition and their reluctance to repeat the same incident that had happened in April, in which their aircraft became overspeed during the approach to Tripoli.

Knowing that they were going to pass the overspeed limit, Abu-Shawashi decided to make a nose-up input, though he was still unaware that the aircraft was descending rapidly. Their altitude became dangerously low that the GPWS warning began to sound. Immediately after this, al-Saadi took over the control from Abu-Shawashi. Remarkably, instead of making a nose-up input, al-Saadi made a full nose-down input, apparently still thinking that the aircraft was pitching up excessively. Abu-Shawashi didn't realise that the aircraft, which had been controlled by him as the pilot flying during the entire flight prior, had been taken over by al-Saadi. The dual input warning should've sounded, warning them of the conflicting commands, but since the alarm's priority was lower than the GPWS warning, it eventually didn't sound. As the issue was not resolved, the aircraft kept descending until it hit terrain.

=== Safety issues ===
The investigation revealed that the crew had been involved in an incident that caused the aircraft to enter an overspeed state during the approach. The recording further showed that the incident happened on 28 April. Comparisons between the flight profile on the day of the accident and the one in April indicated that they were identical, suggesting that both pilots had encountered the same problem before. Interestingly, Afriqiyah Airlines didn't know anything about the incident since both pilots didn't report this to the safety team.

Apart from the flight crew's failure to report the incident to Afriqiyah Airways, the investigation revealed that the analysis system within the airline was lacking. Several procedures, including regular removal of tape recording from aircraft for analysis, were rarely done. The committee stated that the safety policy was not followed properly.

Afriqiyah Airways themselves had been audited three times before the crash. The audits failed to find any deficiencies in training, safety, and operation. At the time of the crash of Flight 771, the airline was being audited by IATA, but the result of the audit indicated that, at the time, no deficiency was found. It was likely that the audit had overlooked certain items, and thus these were not able to be detected.

The training of both pilots was criticised by investigators. Both pilots' failure to solve the problems in their flight, especially their multiple misunderstandings and mishandling of procedures, indicated that the training for both pilots was insufficient. The evaluation process for each pilot was questioned, as basic skill, such as pulling up the nose following a GPWS warning, was not present when both pilots were faced with the problem. Inadequate training was eventually listed as one of the contributing factors of the crash.

=== Conclusion ===
On 28 February 2013, the Libyan Civil Aviation Authority announced that they had determined that the cause of the crash was pilot error. Crew resource management lacked/was insufficient, sensory illusions, and the first officer's inputs to the aircraft side-stick were a contributing factor in the crash. Fatigue was also named as a possible contributing factor in the accident.

The final report stated that the accident resulted from the pilots' lack of a common action plan during the approach, the final approach being continued below the Minimum Decision Altitude without ground visual reference being acquired, the inappropriate application of flight control inputs during the go-around and after the activation of the Terrain Awareness and Warning System, and the flight crew's lack of monitoring and controlling of the flight path.

== Aftermath ==
The airline permanently retired the flight number 771 and it has been re-designated to 788 for Tripoli to Johannesburg and 789 for the return flight.

Following the crash, Airbus immediately held a training session for pilots to prevent misunderstandings or mishandling during go-arounds. In August 2010, Airbus issued its safety magazine, in which the topic "go-around" was discussed in the issue.

In July 2011, families of the victims established the Tripoli Air Disaster Foundation to provide support for affected relatives. The foundation stated that one of its aims was also to receive transparency over the investigation, with several Dutch charities financing their activities.

A monument was planned to be built to commemorate the victims of the crash. It was planned to be built in the Noorderveld cemetery in Nieuwegein, the Netherlands. Design planning was done in 2015, and construction was started in early 2016. On the sixth anniversary of the crash, the monument was unveiled to the public. The monument was a golden globe bearing the date of the disaster on its equator. The floors were decorated with plaques containing the names of each victim.

== In popular culture ==
The 2020 novel Dear Edward by Ann Napolitano, which tells the story of a 12-year-old boy who is the sole survivor of a plane crash that kills all of the other 191 passengers, was inspired in part by the Afriqiyah Airways Flight 771 crash.

== See also ==
- AIRES Flight 8250 – a case where the crew experienced illusions during a black hole approach.
- Gulf Air Flight 072 – the crew experienced somatogravic illusion during a go-around.
- List of aviation accidents and incidents with a sole survivor

== Notes ==
- A Translation: METAR for Tripoli International Airport, issued at 03:50 UTC on the 12th of the month. Winds variable in direction at 1 knot (1.9 km/h), visibility 6,000 metres (3.7 miles), no significant cloud cover, temperature 19 °C, dewpoint 17 °C, altimeter setting 1008 hPa
