= Francisco Andrés Escobar =

Salvadoran actor and writer (1942–2010)

Francisco Andrés Escobar (October 10, 1942 – May 9, 2010) was a Salvadoran actor, writer and journalist. He studied Bachelor of Arts in Social Work and Political Science at the Universidad Centroamericana "Jose Simeon Cañas". He has also directed a dramatic piece of his own composition, A Certain Ignacio (1994), which was dedicated to the memory of Ignacio Ellacuría, the rector at UCA.
