= Rauf Jabbarov =

Azerbaijani boxing manager and trainer

- Born: 8 July 1935; Bilgəh, Baku; Azerbaijan
- Died: 11 May 2010 (aged 74); Bilgəh, Baku; Azerbaijan
- Occupation: Boxing trainer

Rauf Jabbarov (Azerbaijani: Rauf Əbdülqədir oğlu Cabbarov , Russian: Рауф Джаббаров; July 8, 1935 – May 11, 2010) was an Azerbaijani boxing manager and trainer who handled the careers of Ali Ismailov, Rovshan Huseynov, Rashad Ismailov, and Vugar Alakbarov.

== Biography ==
Jabbarov was born in Bilgəh, Baku, Azerbaijan and worked most of his career in Dynamo gym. In 1966, he was appointed head coach of Azerbaijan national boxing team and worked there for 35 years, until his retirement in 2001 following a heart attack.

In 1995, he was awarded the Taraqqi medal by Heydar Aliyev.

== Death ==
On 11 May 2010, Jabbarov died in Bilgəh, Baku, Azerbaijan, after having a second heart attack.
