= Jackson Kaujeua =

- Born: Jackson Muningandu Kaujeua; 3 July 1953; South West Africa
- Died: 27 May 2010 (aged 56)
- Genres: Gospel
- Occupations: Musician, composer, singer
- Instrument: Singing

Jackson Kaujeua (3 July 1953 – 27 May 2010) was a Namibian musician, composer gospel singer, and a veteran of the Namibian struggle for independence. He sang in various Namibian languages but also Afrikaans and English.

He was born Jackson Muningandu Kaujeua, a member of the Herero ethnic group in ǃHuns, a village near Keetmanshoop. Later, he gave up education as a priest at the mission school of Otjimbingwe after he came in touch with the songs of gospel singers like Mahalia Jackson, whose human rights-related lyrics inspired him.

In 1973, he started studying music at the "Dorkay Art & Music College for Talented Non-Whites" in South Africa. However, he was soon expelled from the country for anti-apartheid activism and went into exile in 1974. After a short time in Botswana, the SWAPO-resistance movement (with which he was associated until his death) helped him to move to the UK, where he soon became the lead singer of the group Black Diamond. International success followed with songs such as "Winds of Change".

Having lived as a teacher in an Angolan refugee camp from 1979 to the early 80s and later in Sweden, he returned to Namibia before independence in 1990, where he celebrated great successes with his music, especially with ǃGnubu ǃNubus (Khoekhoe: short and round). In the late 1990s, he was still one of the best-known Namibian musicians.

Kaujeua died of kidney failure on 27 May 2010, after suffering from a kidney disorder for six months. In Namibia, kidney dialysis is only available in privately run medical facilities, which most citizens are unable to afford. Kaujeua had lived and died in poverty. He was formally unemployed for most of his life, living off his performances and royalties. Calls for some sort of employment or empowerment for his role as "musical ambassador for the liberation struggle" were not answered by the authorities.

Kaujeua had four children. A street in central Windhoek is named in his honor, as well as a street in Ongwediva.

== Albums ==
- Katutura (1998, Mukurob Productions)
