= Vera Beaudin Saeedpour =

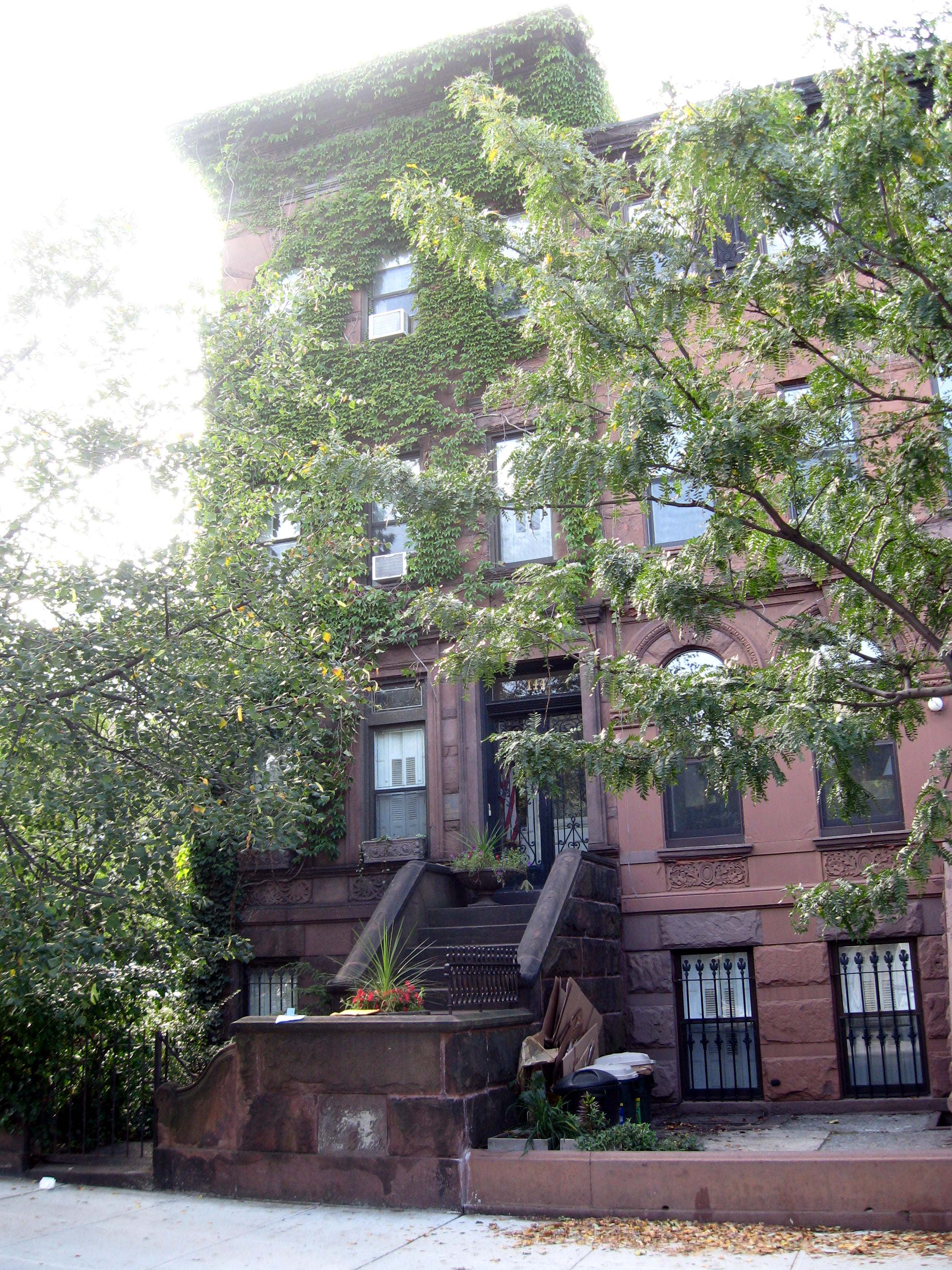
The Kurdish Heritage Foundation of America in Prospect Heights, Brooklyn

Vera Marion Beaudin Saeedpour (pronounced sah-EED-por; née Fine; March 27, 1930 – May 30, 2010) was an American researcher and scholar who specialized in the study of Kurdish people. She founded the Kurdish Heritage Foundation of America, the first library and museum in the United States dedicated to the subject. The foundation was located in the Prospect Heights neighborhood of Brooklyn in New York City.

== Early life ==
Saeedpour was born Vera Marion Fine in Barre, Vermont on March 27, 1930, to Jewish immigrants from Russia. Her father sold scrap metal and rags for a living.

She grew up in the only Jewish family in the town. At age 17, she eloped with Marcel Beaudin and moved to Brooklyn, where she worked at a bakery. She later spent eight years working as an assistant to New York City real estate developer Seymour Durst. The couple had four sons, Marc, Paul, Adam and Jeb, and one daughter, Rebecca. Their marriage ended in divorce.

At age 40 she enrolled at the University of Vermont, where she earned a bachelor's degree in sociology and a master's degree in philosophy. After her divorce from Beaudin, she enrolled at Teachers College, Columbia University, where she earned a Ph.D. in 1976.

While at Columbia, she moved to an apartment in Harlem. When her home was robbed, she called out to a man in an apartment across the street to ask if he had witnessed the burglary. That man, Homayoun Saeedpour, a 26-year-old Kurd from Sanandaj, later rang her doorbell and offered cake and flowers. They married soon after.

== Kurdish interest ==
After her marriage to Saeedpour, Vera developed an interest in the plight of the Kurdish people. She was unfamiliar with the Kurds and their history when she first met her husband, but a decade later she felt she got to "know the Kurds better than any Westerner living". At one point, in need of a bone marrow transplant to treat his leukemia, her husband's doctor refused to treat him, believing that he was Persian.

They were married 5 years. Following her husband's death, in 1986, Saeedpour opened the Kurdish Heritage Foundation of America with a library in her Prospect Heights, Brooklyn brownstone. The museum, opened in 1988, was the first museum with a focus on the Kurds in the United States. The library contained more than 3,000 texts in Kurdish and other languages, as well as Kurdish artifacts, art, costumes and maps. After her death the collection was donated to the Binghamton University by her children.

For 15 years Saeedpour published a comprehensive and insightful quarterly on the middle east called Kurdish Life and edited the International Journal of Kurdish Studies as part of the Kurdish Program she established together with anthropologists at Harvard University and Cultural Survival. Before the Gulf War, she organized a speaking tour for Kurdish politician Jalal Talabani, later to become President of Iraq.

== Death ==
A resident of Fort Plain, New York, Saeedpour died at age 80 of a heart attack on May 30, 2010, in Schenectady, New York. She is survived by her five children and two grandchildren.
