= Bree O'Mara =

Irish-South African novelist and media host

- Born: Bridgid O'Mara; 4 July 1968; Durban, Natal Province, South Africa
- Died: 12 May 2010 (aged 41); Tripoli, Libya
- Occupation: Novelist
- Writing career
- Genres: Fantasy; Drama; Romantic
- Notable works: Nigel Watson, Superhero; Home Affairs

Bridgid "Bree" O'Mara (4 July 1968 – 12 May 2010) was an Irish-South African novelist, ballet dancer, TV producer and air hostess who was killed in the crash of Afriqiyah Airways Flight 771.

== Biography ==
=== Early life ===
O'Mara was born in Durban, Natal Province, South Africa of Irish parentage and carried an Irish passport. She attended the Maris Stella School in Durban during the early 1980s. After an early career in theater O'Mara worked as a flight attendant for Gulf Air, before becoming a video producer in the Gulf States. After travelling through Canada and the United States, living briefly in Elkins, West Virginia, she settled in London during the 1990s. She was living in Northamptonshire in the early 2000s. In 2003, she worked as a volunteer for Mondo Challenge in Tanzania. She returned to her childhood home of South Africa in 2005.

=== Personal life ===
At the time of her death, she lived in Kosmos, Madibeng, with her husband Christopher Leach. British mercenary Mike Hoare was her uncle. She wrote an unpublished account of his adventures as a mercenary in the Congo during the 1960s and the Seychelles in the 1970s.

=== Death ===
She was travelling on Afriqiyah Airways Flight 771, which crashed in Libya, on her way to visit London for a meeting with publishers. She had previously been forced to abandon a scheduled appearance at the London Book Fair by the cancellation of flights to the UK resulting from the Eyjafjallajökull eruption.

== Works ==
- Home Affairs (2007) (winner of the Citizen Book Prize)
- Nigel Watson, Superhero (scheduled for publication in 2010)

== Awards ==
- 2007 Citizen Book Prize
