= Peter J. Hall =

British-born American costume designer (1926–2010)

Peter John Hall (January 22, 1926 – May 27, 2010) was a British-born American costume designer who spent most of his career as costumer for the Dallas Opera, in addition to his work for Covent Garden, La Scala, the Old Vic and the Vienna State Opera, as well as productions in New York City for the American Ballet Theatre, the Metropolitan Opera, the New York City Opera and on Broadway.

Hall was born in Bristol, England, on January 22, 1926. He attended the West of England College of Art (later known as the University of the West of England). He served in the British Army during World War II, where he specialized in designing camouflage for air bases and gun emplacements.

After he completed his military service, his mother gave him two days to find work in the theater before he considered other options, but on his first day looking for work, Hall was able to find a job as an assistant stage manager in a musical based on the opera Die Fledermaus, where he was able to make do in the wake of postwar shortages of materials. While working as a costume designer at Covent Garden, he met Franco Zeffirelli, who brought him to the Dallas Opera in the 1960s, where he designed the occasional set, but spent most of his career on the costumes for 70 operas. He was the resident costume designer for the Metropolitan Opera in the 1970s to 1980s, where his work included costumes for Zeffirelli's productions of La bohème, Otello and Tosca. While in New York City, he also designed costumes for the 1979 Broadway production of Zoot Suit. He dressed David Bowie and Mick Jagger while they were on tour, calling Bowie "serious, intellectual, wonderful to work with", while Jagger was "exactly the opposite".

He dressed performers including Judi Dench, Plácido Domingo, Luciano Pavarotti, Joan Sutherland and Kiri Te Kanawa, and was noted by The New York Times for his costumes and "the way they moved, the way they caught the light, the way they could be coaxed amicably around singers of some dimension", with John Gage of the Dallas Opera describing how "his designs look like Renaissance paintings". A gown he created for soprano Lella Cuberli in the Dallas Opera's production of Semiramide weighed 65 pounds and was constructed of scarlet covered with costume jewels, requiring four people on stage to control the 20-foot-long train he designed.

A resident of Dallas, he died there at age 84 on May 27, 2010, after a long illness. He left no immediate survivors.

== Externals ==
- Peter J. Hall at IMDb
