= Juan Arcocha =

Cuban journalist and writer (1927–2010)

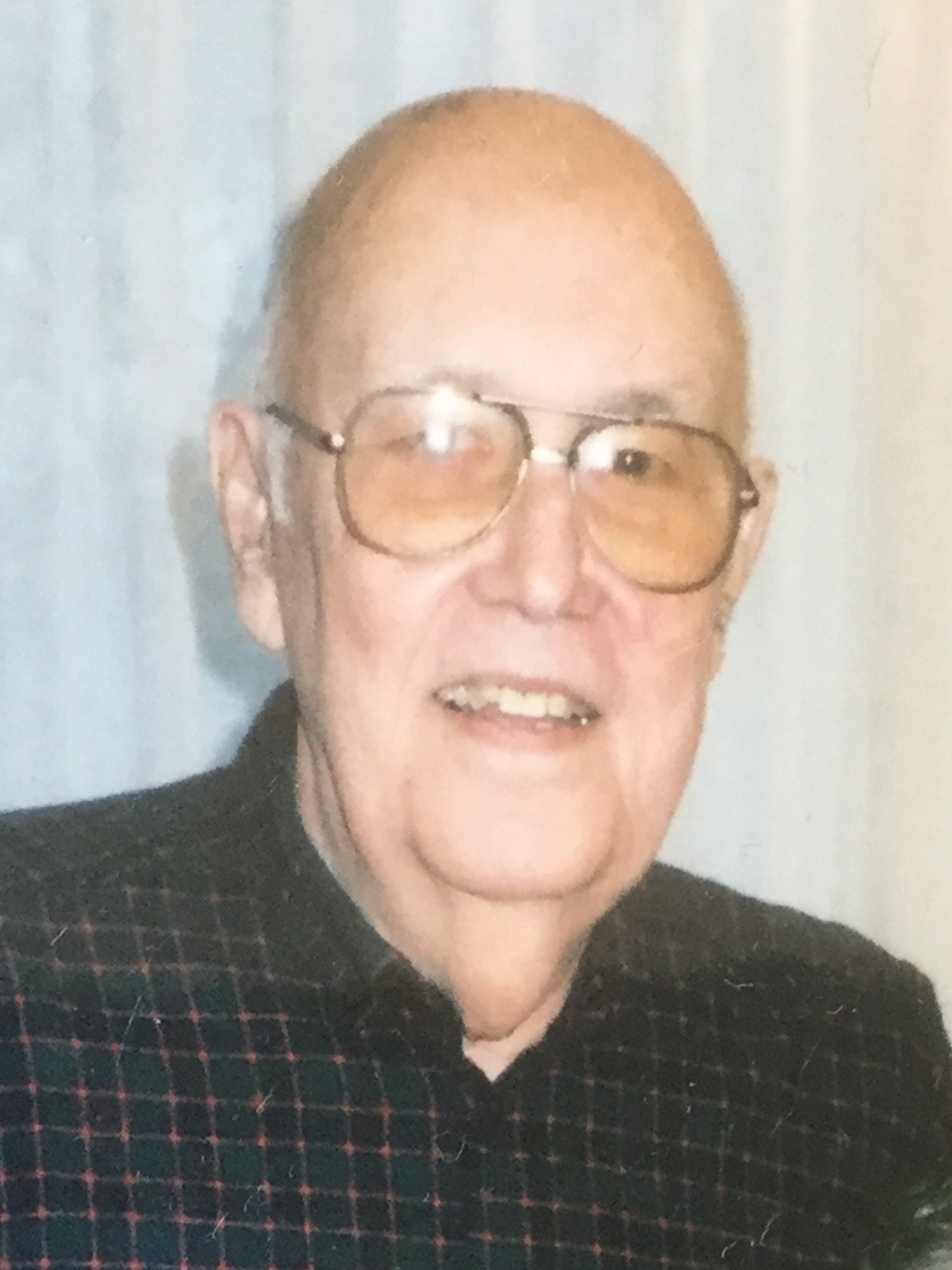
- Born: 1927; Santiago de Cuba
- Died: May 7, 2010; Paris, France
- Occupations: Journalist, writer

Juan Arcocha (November 7, 1927 – May 7, 2010) was a Cuban journalist and writer.

== Biography ==
Juan Arcocha, born in Santiago de Cuba in 1927, was a Cuban journalist and writer active in the late 20th century. Arcocha was an initial supporter of the Cuban Revolution, working as a correspondent for the communist newspaper Revolución in Moscow in the 1960s. He broke ties with the regime over the unfair incarceration of Cuban political prisoner Heberto Padilla, exiling himself to Paris in 1971.

In addition to his prolific literary work, Arcocha served as an interpreter throughout his career, facilitating the meeting between Cuban communist officials and Jean-Paul Sartre and Simone de Beauvoir during the philosophers’ visit to Havana in 1960. He would eventually work as an interpreter for the United Nations and its Educational, Scientific and Cultural Organization (UNESCO), as well as acting as the press attaché for the Cuban Embassy in Paris. He died in Paris on May 7, 2010.

== Works or publications ==
- A Candle in the Wind, OCLC 913974
- El Tiburón Vegetariano, O, Ese Amor Imaginado : Novela, OCLC 821071499
- Fidel Castro en rompecabezas, OCLC 894535
- La bala perdida; relato novelado y ejemplar donde se ve cuánto se alarman los hijos de Saturno cuando a éste se le abre el apetito, OCLC 1003764
- La Conversación, OCLC 9868306
- Los baños de canela, OCLC 18595023
- Los Muertos Andan Solos : novela, OCLC 506832
- Operación Viceversa, OCLC 10685717
- Où en est révolution en Amérique latine? débat public ... entre Claude Julien, Josué de Castro, Juan Arcocha, Mario Vargas Llosa, OCLC 835454322
- Por Cuenta Propia, OCLC 1668810
- Tatiana Et Les Hommes Abondants : Roman, OCLC 469246585
- Tatiana y los hombres abundantes, OCLC 9294708
