= Fools Rush In (1997 film) =

1997 film by Andy Tennant

- Theatrical release poster
- Directed by: Andy Tennant
- Screenplay by: Katherine Reback
- Story by: Joan Taylor; Katherine Reback
- Produced by: Doug Draizin; Michael McDonnell
- Starring: Matthew Perry; Salma Hayek; Jon Tenney; Jill Clayburgh
- Cinematography: Robbie Greenberg
- Edited by: Roger Bondelli
- Music by: Alan Silvestri
- Production company: Columbia Pictures
- Distributed by: Sony Pictures Releasing
- Release date: February 14, 1997
- Running time: 109 minutes
- Country: United States
- Languages: English; Spanish
- Budget: $20 million
- Box office: $42 million

Fools Rush In is a 1997 American romantic comedy film starring Matthew Perry and Salma Hayek, directed by Andy Tennant. The film mainly focused on a mixed-ethnic couple. Fools Rush In was released by Sony Pictures Releasing on February 14, 1997. The film received negative reviews from critics and grossed $42 million against a $20 million budget.

== Plot ==
Alex Whitman, a New York City architect, is sent to Las Vegas to project-manage the construction of a nightclub that his firm has been hired to build. He is a straight-laced, WASP-ish type and meets Isabel Fuentes, a free-spirited Mexican photographer. Alex and Isabel are immediately attracted to each other and spend the night together. In the morning, Isabel quietly slips away while Alex is still asleep.

Three months later, Isabel finds Alex to tell him she is pregnant with his child. She has decided to keep and raise the child alone, although it will disappoint her family. Isabel asks Alex to a family dinner so they can meet her baby's father at least once. He agrees, and despite some cultural differences, he finds himself more attracted to Isabel. Though Isabel is prepared to say goodbye, Alex suggests they pursue a relationship.

Alex proposes, and they quickly marry at a Las Vegas wedding chapel, complete with an Elvis impersonator serving as a witness. However, they gradually both wonder if they belong together, especially as Alex struggles to balance his New York-based career with Isabel's desire to stay in Nevada, near her family. Isabel's father disowns her, when he finds out that Isabel is pregnant and eloped without her family's and his consent.

In early June, when Alex is at his company's head office, his boss tells him to return on July 1 for a new project and promotion. He secretly agrees to it, although he had promised Isabel they would not go until after the baby is born in October.

The newlyweds fight when Isabel finds out why Alex has been so busy and distant. Isabel suffers from a medical complication. While in the hospital, she lets Alex believe she lost the baby and says they're not meant to be together.

Distraught, Alex returns to New York while Isabel, who is still pregnant, goes to Mexico to stay with her great-grandmother. After being served with divorce papers, he sees several "signs" such as a priest telling him to watch carefully for guidance, almost tripping over a chihuahua, seeing a photo of the Grand Canyon and finally a young Latina named Isabel cannot keep her eyes off him. Alex realizes he loves Isabel and wants her more than his career.

Alex travels to rural Mexico to find Isabel, unaware she is still pregnant. Her great-grandmother, who only speaks Spanish, states that Isabel loves Alex and is driving back to Las Vegas to have her baby (which he only understands as she has returned to Las Vegas). He intercepts her at the Hoover Dam and says he loves her, then realizes she is still pregnant.

Isabel suddenly goes into labor and gives birth to a daughter, which coincides with their divorce becoming finalized. Soon after, they remarry with both families present, atop a cliff overlooking the Grand Canyon.

== Cast ==
- Matthew Perry as Alex Whitman
- Salma Hayek as Isabel Fuentes-Whitman
- Jon Tenney as Jeff
- Carlos Gomez as Chuy
- Tomas Milian as Tomas Fuentes
- Siobhan Fallon as Lainie
- John Bennett Perry as Richard Whitman
- Stanley DeSantis as Judd Marshall
- Anne Betancourt as Amalia Fuentes
- Suzanne Snyder as Cathy Stewart
- Jill Clayburgh as Nan Whitman

== Reception ==
=== Critical response ===
On the review aggregator website Rotten Tomatoes, 33% of 36 critics' reviews are positive, with an average rating of 5.2/10. The website's consensus reads: "Only Fools Rush In to see a basic romantic comedy where opposites try to attract and find an unlikely happy ending." Metacritic, which uses a weighted average, assigned the film a score of 37 out of 100, based on 17 critics, indicating "generally unfavorable" reviews.

A positive review came from Roger Ebert of the Chicago Sun-Times, who gave the film 3 stars out of a possible 4. He described Fools Rush In as "a sweet, entertaining retread of an ancient formula", elevated by good performances (particularly Hayek) and an insightful "level of observation and human comedy".

Matthew Perry considered Fools Rush In his "best movie".

=== Box office ===
In the United States and Canada, Fools Rush In grossed $29.5 million at the box office, and $13 million in other territories, for a worldwide total of $42 million.

=== Accolades ===
Association	Year	Category	Recipient	Result
ALMA Awards	1998	Outstanding Feature Film	Fools Rush In	Nominated
ALMA Awards	1998	Outstanding Actress in a Feature Film	Salma Hayek	Nominated
Imagen Foundation Awards	1997	Best Film	Fools Rush In	Nominated

== See also ==
- List of films set in Las Vegas
