= Shadreck Biemba =

Zambian footballer and coach (1965–2010)

Personal information
- Full name: Mzansi Shadrack Biemba
- Date of birth: 4 January 1965
- Place of birth: Lusaka, Zambia
- Date of death: 8 May 2010 (aged 45)
- Place of death: Cape Town, South Africa
- Height: 1.86 m (6 ft 1 in)
- Position: Goalkeeper

Senior career*
Years	Team	Apps	(Gls)
1990–1994	Bloemfontein Celtic	81	(0)
1995–1997	AmaZulu	48	(0)
Total		129	(0)

International career
1990–1994	Zambia	12	(0)

Managerial career
- 1996–1998: Tembisa Classic
- 1999–2002: Dangerous Darkies
- 2003–2005: Black Leopards
- 2006–2010: Moroka Swallows (goalkeeping coach)
- * Club domestic league appearances and goals

Mzansi Shadrack Biemba (4 January 1965 – 8 May 2010) was a Zambian professional football player and coach.

== Career ==
=== Playing career ===
Biemba, who played as a goalkeeper, played club football in South Africa for AmaZulu, having previously played for Bloemfontein Celtic.

Biemba also represented the Zambian national side, making 12 appearances between 1990 and 1994.

=== Coaching career ===
Biemba later became a goalkeeping coach with the South African club side Moroka Swallows, active in that position between 2006 and 2010.

== Death ==
Biemba died of cancer on 8 May 2010 at the age of 45.
