= Kurdish Heritage Foundation of America =

Coordinates: 40°40′35″N 73°57′59.3″W

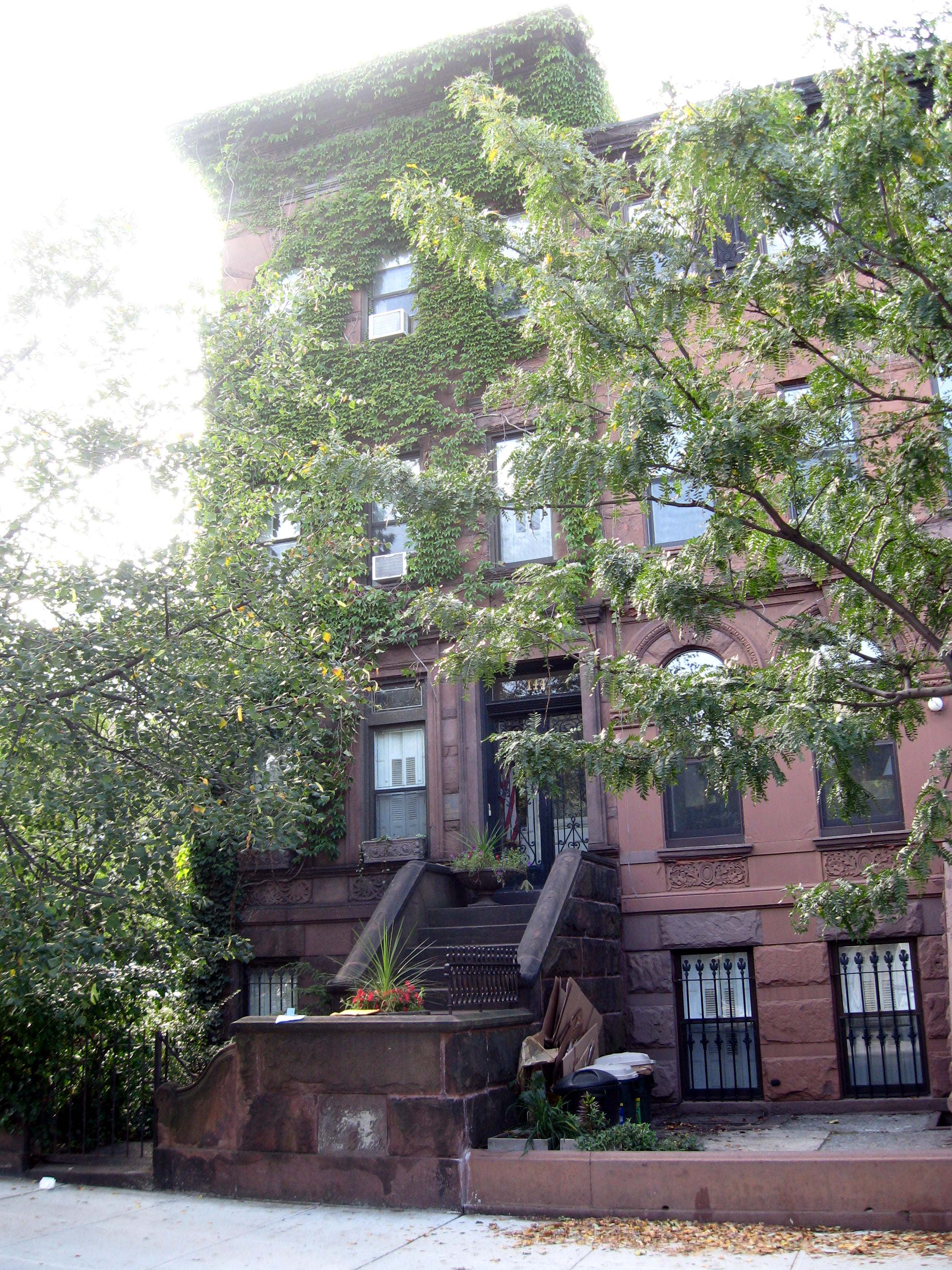
144 Underhill Avenue in Prospect Heights

Kurdish Heritage Foundation of America, also known as Kurdish Library and Museum, was a cultural organization based in Brooklyn, New York. It collected items related to Kurdish culture, literature and history. Its library contained around 3,000 volumes on Kurdish-related subjects.

The museum was focused on Kurdish art and handicrafts. This organization was founded by Vera Beaudin Saeedpour in 1981. She was the widow of Homayoun Saeedpour, a Kurd from Sanandaj, Iran. The Library was established in 1986, and the Museum was opened in 1988.

The library published two scholarly research journals: International Journal of Kurdish Studies and Kurdish Life.

After Vera Beaudin Saeedpour died in 2010, the contents of the museum were donated to Binghamton University.
