= Gerald Roush =

American sports car expert (1941–2010)

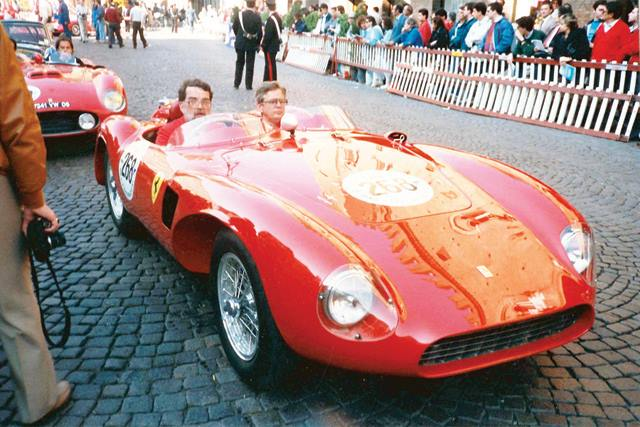
Gerald Roush seated at left as driver in this Ferrari 625 s/n 0642MDTR at the Mille Miglia race in Italia in May 1987. His co-driver and passenger is Steve Barney.

Gerald Lee Roush (October 5, 1941 – May 21, 2010) was an American sports car expert who specialized in Ferraris, with much of his knowledge on the details and histories of the Italian sports cars covered in Ferrari Market Letter, a magazine that he published and distributed.

Roush was born on October 5, 1941, in Durango, Colorado, but moved several times during his childhood to locations where his father was assigned by International Harvester. While in high school in Birmingham, Alabama, Roush picked up a 1958 issue of Sports Car Illustrated that featured driver Phil Hill, winner of the 1958 24 Hours of Le Mans and a Ferrari 4.9 Superfast, giving birth to an interest that would last a lifetime. While earning degrees in history at Auburn University, Roush started attending car races and shows, where he began tracking details of each Ferrari on 5x7 index cards identified by its serial number, supplemented by details gleaned from classified ads of Ferraris listed for sale in newspapers around the U.S.

He was a history professor at Abraham Baldwin Agricultural College for two years in the mid-1970s, but quit that post to take a job in the parts department of FAF Motorcars, a Tucker, Georgia Ferrari dealership where he was able to add additional information to his growing database of index cards. He started publishing the biweekly Ferrari Market Letter in January 1976 together with his wife in their home and started working full-time on the magazine two years later. Over time, Ferrari Market Letter became the paper of record for Ferraris, including a classified ads section that required a Vehicle Identification Number for each vehicle. He became a specialist in the histories of specific vehicles and would be called on as an expert to provide information about the vehicles in his burgeoning files. By the time of his death Ferrari had manufactured 130,000 vehicles, and Roush had details of the original specifications, later modifications and ownership history of almost all of them.

Roush had owned three Ferraris over the years, but sold them to ensure that there was no conflict of interest when he published Ferrari Market Letter.

A resident of Lilburn, Georgia, Roush died of a heart attack at age 68 on May 21, 2010, after having a stroke in March on his way to a car show.
