= Brilliant Light Power =

Company based in Cranbury, New Jersey

Brilliant Light Power, Inc.
- Founded: HydroCatalysis Inc. in 1991.
- Founder: Randell L. Mills
- Headquarters: 493 Old Trenton Rd. Cranbury Township, New Jersey, USA
- Number of employees: 22 fulltime, 8 consultants
- Subsidiaries: "Millsian, Inc".
- Website: BrilliantLightPower.com

Brilliant Light Power, Inc. (BLP), formerly BlackLight Power, Inc. of Cranbury, New Jersey, is a company founded by Randell L. Mills, who claims to have discovered a new energy source from what he says is the electron in a hydrogen atom dropping below its ground energy state into a "hydrino state". The claims lack corroborating scientific evidence and the proposed hydrino states are unphysical and incompatible with key equations of quantum mechanics. BLP has announced several times that it was about to deliver commercial products based on Mill's theories but has never delivered any working product.

Mills has self-published a closely related book, The Grand Unified Theory of Classical Physics and has co-authored numerous articles on hydrino-related phenomena. Critical analyses have been published in the peer reviewed journals Physics Letters A, New Journal of Physics, Journal of Applied Physics, and Journal of Physics D: Applied Physics. In 2009, IEEE Spectrum magazine characterized it as a "loser" technology because "most experts don't believe such lower states exist, and they say the experiments don't present convincing evidence" and mentioned that physicist Wolfgang Ketterle had said the claims are "nonsense".

== Company ==
The company, originally called HydroCatalysis Inc., was founded in 1991 by Randell Mills who claimed to have discovered a power source that "represents a boundless form of new primary energy" and that will "replace all forms of fuel in the world". On April 25, 1991 at a press conference in Lancaster, Pennsylvania, Mills first announced his hydrino state hypothesis which rejects the idea that "cold fusion" was occurring in studies surrounding the Fleischmann–Pons experiment. According to Mills all the effects (which themselves were disputed to be unreproducible) were caused by shrinkage of hydrogen atoms as they fell to a state below the ground state. Arguments offered by Mills were in contradiction to known chemistry and were dismissed by the scientific community.

By December 1999, BLP raised more than $25 million from about 150 investors. By January 2006, BLP funding exceeded $60 million.

Among the investors are PacifiCorp, Conectiv, retired executives from Morgan Stanley and several BLP board members like Shelby Brewer who was the top nuclear official for the Reagan Administration and Chief Executive Officer of ABB-Combustion Engineering Nuclear Power and former board member Michael H. Jordan (1936 – 2010), who was Chief Executive Officer of PepsiCo Worldwide Foods, Westinghouse Electric Corporation, CBS Corporation and Electronic Data Systems.

In 2008, Mills said that his cell stacks could provide power for long-range electric vehicles, and that this electricity would cost less than 2 cents per kilowatt-hour.

In December 2013, BLP was one of 54 applicants to receive ~$1.1M in grant funding from the New Jersey Economic Development Authority.

=== Collaborators with the company ===
In 1996, NASA released a report describing experiments using a BLP electrolytic cell. Although not recreating the large heat gains reported for the cell by BLP, unexplained power gains ranging from 1.06 to 1.68 of the input power were reported, which, whilst "...admit[ing] the existence of an unusual source of heat with the cell...falls far short of being compelling". The authors went on to propose the recombination of hydrogen and oxygen as a possible explanation of the anomalous results.

Around 2002, the NASA Institute for Advanced Concepts (NIAC) granted a Phase I grant to Anthony Marchese, a mechanical engineer at Rowan University, to study a possible rocket propulsion that would use hydrinos.

In 2002, Rowan University's Anthony Marchese said that whilst "agnostic about the existence of hydrinos", he was quite confident that there was no fraud involved with BLP. Although his NIAC grant was criticised by Bob Park, Marchese said "for me to not continue with this study would be unethical to the scientific community. The only reason not to pursue this would be because of being afraid of being bullied."

== Criticism ==
In 1999, the Nobel prize winning physicist Philip Warren Anderson said he is "sure that it's a fraud", and in the same year another Nobel prize winning physicist, Steven Chu, called it "extremely unlikely". The following year, a 2000 patent based on its hydrino-related technology was later withdrawn by the United States Patent and Trademark Office (USPTO) due to contradictions with known physics laws and other concerns about the viability of the described processes, citing Park and others.

An April 2000 editorial column by Robert L. Park and an outside query by an unknown person prompted Group Director Esther Kepplinger of the USPTO to review this new patent herself. Kepplinger said that her "main concern was the proposition that the applicant was claiming the electron going to a lower orbital in a fashion that I knew was contrary to the known laws of physics and chemistry", and that the patent appeared to involve cold fusion and perpetual motion. Kepplinger contacted another Director, Robert Spar, who also expressed doubts on the patentability of the patent application. This caused the USPTO to withdraw from issue the patent application before it was granted and re-open it for review, and to withdraw four related applications, including one for a hydrino power plant.

In 2000, a law firm engaged by BLP sent letters to four prominent physicists asking them to stop making what it called "defamatory comments". The physicists had been quoted in the Village Voice, Dow Jones Newswires and other publications as dismissing BLP's claims on the basis that they violated the laws of physics. In response, one of the physicists, Robert L. Park of the American Physical Society, said that if BLP sued, he was confident the scientific community would lend its support and that the court would side with the physicists. Park later wrote that a number of the recipients of the letter, who had "responded honestly to questions from the media", had since fallen silent. Scientists, Park wrote, are easy to intimidate since they are not rich enough to risk costly legal actions.

In May 2000, BLP filed suit in the US District Court of Columbia, saying that withdrawal of the application after the company had paid the fee was contrary to law. In 2002, the District Court concluded that the USPTO was acting inside the limits of its authority in withdrawing a patent over whose validity it had doubts, and later that year, the United States Court of Appeals for the Federal Circuit ratified this decision. Applications were rejected by the UK patent office for similar reasons. The European Patent Office (EPO) rejected a similar BLP patent application due to lack of clarity on how the process worked. Reexamination of this European patent is pending.

Robert L. Park, emeritus professor of physics at the University of Maryland and a notable skeptic, has been particularly critical of BLP since 1991. By 2000, Park remained skeptical, stating:

"Unlike most schemes for free energy, the hydrino process of Randy Mills is not without ample theory. Mills has written a 1000 page tome, entitled, "The Grand Unified Theory of Classical Quantum Mechanics", that takes the reader all the way from hydrinos to antigravity. Fortunately, Aaron Barth [...] has taken upon himself to look through it, checking for accuracy. Barth is a post doctoral researcher at the Harvard–Smithsonian Center for Astrophysics, and holds a PhD in Astronomy, 1998, from UC Berkeley. What he found initially were mathematical blunders and unjustified assumptions. To his surprise, however, portions of the book seemed well organized. These, it now turns out, were lifted verbatim from various texts. This has been the object of a great deal of discussion from Mills' Hydrino Study Group. "Mills seems not to understand what the fuss is all about." – Park

By 2008, Park continued to express his skepticism:

"BlackLight Power (BLP), founded 17 years ago as HydroCatalysis, announced last week that the company had successfully tested a prototype power system that would generate 50 KW of thermal power. BLP anticipates delivery of the new power system in 12 to 18 months. The BLP process, discovered by Randy Mills, is said to coax hydrogen atoms into a "state below the ground state", called the "hydrino". There is no independent scientific confirmation of the hydrino, and BLP has a patent problem. So they have nothing to sell but bull shit. The company is therefore dependent on investors with deep pockets and shallow brains." – Park

In 2008, Robert L. Park wrote that BLP has benefited from wealthy investors who allocate a proportion of their funds to risky ventures with a potentially huge upside, but that in the case of BLP since the science underlying the offering was "just wrong" investment risk was, in Park's view, "infinite".

Various scientists also voiced their opinions as far back as the 1990s. Steven Chu, Nobel Laureate in Physics in 1997, said "it's extremely unlikely that this is real, and I feel sorry for the funders, the people who are backing this". In 1999, Princeton University's physics Nobel laureate Phillip Anderson said of it, "If you could fuck around with the hydrogen atom, you could fuck around with the energy process in the sun. You could fuck around with life itself." "Everything we know about everything would be a bunch of nonsense. That's why I'm so sure that it's a fraud." Wolfgang Ketterle, a professor of physics at MIT, said BLP's claims are "nonsense" and that "there is no state of hydrogen lower than the ground state". Michio Kaku, a theoretical physicist based at City University of New York, adds that "the only law that this business with Mills is proving is that a fool and his money are easily parted." and that "There's a sucker born every minute." While Peter Zimmerman was chief arms-control scientist at the State Department, he stated that his department and the Patent Office "have fought back with success" against "pseudoscientists" and he railed against, among other things, the inventors of "hydrinos". In 2009, the editors of IEEE Spectrum magazine characterized it as a "loser" technology because "[m]ost experts don't believe such lower states exist, and they say the experiments don't present convincing evidence" and mentioned that Wolfgang Ketterle had said the claims are "nonsense". BLP has announced several times that it was about to deliver commercial products based on Mill's theories but has not delivered a working product.

Mark Chu-Carroll a science blogger and professional software engineer accused Mills of engaging in a scam: "Mills... is getting investors to give him money, promising that whatever they invest, they'll get back manifold when he starts selling hydrino power generators! He promises they'll be on market within a year or two – five at most! Then he comes up with either a demonstration, or the testimonial from his neighbor, or the self-publication of his book, or another press release talking about the newest version of his technology..... It's been going on for almost 25 years, this constant cycle of press release/demo/testimonial every couple of years.... claims from 2009 claiming commercialization within 12 to 18 months; from 2005 claiming commercialization within months; and claims from 1999 claiming commercialization within a year.... But he always comes up with an excuse why those deadlines needed to be missed. And he always manages to find more investors, willing to hand over millions of dollars. As long as suckers are still willing to give him money, why wouldn't he keep on making claims?"

Scientific American reported that in 2014, Mills was asked by an interested follower if he had ever isolated hydrinos and, in spite of previous claims, Mills said that he had not and that it would be "a really, really huge task." The interlocutor pointed out that if hydrinos were being produced at the rate Mills claimed, there would be obvious observations. Moreover, there was no sign of progress, "Every year they make up half the remaining distance to commercialization, but will they ever get there?"

In 2015, an energy analyst writing for Forbes noted that Mills had made numerous extraordinary and difficult-to-believe claims including that he had "refuted quantum mechanics, can explain "mysteries of the sun" and has identified dark energy. His inventions can: produce power very cheaply through "'shrinking' the hydrogen atom's orbitsphere" with a power density of 100 billion watts per liter. Additionally, the materials created can act as an explosive or propellant, make ships rustproof and endowed with stealth properties, produce an anti-gravity effect that will allow a vessel to elevate, and "form the basis of batteries the size of a briefcase to drive your car 1000 miles at highway speeds on a single charge.""

== Peer-reviewed criticisms ==
In the 2000s, several reviewed articles were published criticizing Hydrino theory for being incompatible with Quantum Mechanics.

For example, in 2005, Andreas Rathke of the European Space Agency, publishing in the New Journal of Physics, wrote that Mills' description of quantum mechanics is "inconsistent and has several serious deficiencies", and that there is "no theoretical support of the hydrino hypothesis". Rathke said it would be helpful if Mills' experimental results could be independently replicated, and suggested that any evidence produced should be reconsidered in the context of a conventional physical explanation. One inconsistency of Mills' CQM with quantum mechanics regards its inability to be reconciled with the probability density function in quantum mechanics. Rathke stated, "However, while solutions of the Schrödinger equation with n<1 indeed exist, they are not square integrable. This violates not only an axiom of quantum mechanics, but in practical terms prohibits that these solutions can in any way describe the probability density of a particle." In the same year, the Journal of Applied Physics published a critique by A.V. Phelps of the 2004 article, "Water bath calorimetric study of excess heat generation in resonant transfer plasmas" by J. Phillips, R. Mills and X. Chen. Phelps criticized both the calorimetric techniques and the underlying theory described in the Phillips/Mills/Chen article. The journal also published a response to Phelps' critique on the same day. In 2005 Šišović and others published a paper describing experimental data and analysis of Mills' claim that a resonant transfer model (RTM) explains the excessive Doppler broadening of the Hα line. Šišović concluded that: "The detected large excessive broadening in pure hydrogen and in Ne–H2 mixture is in agreement with CM [Collision Model] and other experimental results" and that "these results can't be explained by RTM". The collision model explanation for excessive broadening of the Hα line is based on established physics.

In 2006, a paper published in Physics Letters A, concluded that Mills' theoretical hydrino states are unphysical. For the hydrino states, the binding strength increases as the strength of the electric potential decreases, with maximum binding strength when the potential has disappeared completely. The author Norman Dombey remarked "We could call these anomalous states "homeopathic" states because the smaller the coupling, the larger the effect." The model also assumes that the nuclear charge distribution is a point rather than having an arbitrarily small non-zero radius. It also lacks an analogous solution in the Schrödinger equation, which governs non-relativistic systems. Dombey concluded: "We suggest that outside of science fiction this is sufficient reason to disregard them." From a suggestion in Dombey's paper, further work by Antonio Di Castro has shown that states below the ground state, as described in Mills' work, are incompatible with the Schrödinger, Klein–Gordon and Dirac equations, key equations in the study of quantum systems.

In 2008, the Journal of Physics D: Applied Physics published an article by Hans-Joachim Kunze, professor emeritus at the Institute for Experimental Physics, Ruhr University Bochum, critical of the 2003 paper authored by R. Mills and P. Ray, Extreme ultraviolet spectroscopy of helium–hydrogen. The abstract of the article is: "It is suggested that spectral lines, on which the fiction of fractional principal quantum numbers in the hydrogen atom is based, are nothing else but artefacts." Kunze stated that it was impossible to detect the novel lines below 30 nm reported by Mills and Ray because the equipment they used did not have the capability to detect them as per the manufacturer and as per "every book on vacuum-UV spectroscopy" and "therefore the observed lines must be artefacts". Kunze also stated that: "The enormous spectral widths of the novel lines point to artefacts, too."

== See also ==
- List of topics characterized as pseudoscience
