= Michael H. Jordan =

American businessman (1936–2010)

Michael H. Jordan (June 13, 1936 – May 25, 2010) was an American businessman. He served as the chief executive officer of PepsiCo Worldwide Foods (1986–1990), Westinghouse Electric Corporation (1993–1998), CBS Corporation (1995–1998), and Electronic Data Systems (2003–2007).

== Personal life ==
Jordan was born in Kansas City, Missouri, to Mary Virginia Witt and Hugh Franklin Jordan.

He wed Kathryn Hiett in Toledo, Ohio, on April 8, 1961. Married for 38 years, Kim gave birth to two children, Kathryn (Kate Donaldson) and Stephen. The marriage ended in divorce.

He met and later married Hilary Cecil, an executive recruiter, on March 4, 2000 in New York City.

== Education ==
Jordan graduated from Yale University in 1957 with a B.S. in Chemical Engineering, then earned a M.S. in Chemical Engineering from Princeton University in 1959.

== Naval career ==
Jordan was a member of the Reserve Officers Training Corps in college. In 1960, he joined the United States Navy as a lieutenant and was selected by Admiral Hyman G. Rickover to serve on his staff, which was developing America's nuclear submarine force. He left active duty in 1964.

== Career ==
From 1964 to 1974, Jordan served as consultant and principal at McKinsey & Company. Michael joined PepsiCo in 1974, where he held various senior executive positions. Among the positions he held at the company were president of the International Foods and Beverages Division and CFO. He retired in July 1992 as Chairman and CEO PepsiCo's International Foods and Beverages Division.

From 1992 to 1993, he became a principal of Clayton, Dubilier & Rice (CD&R), a private investment firm. In 1993, he was recruited as the first outside chairman and CEO of Westinghouse Electric Corporation headquartered in Pittsburgh. He led the company through one of the most comprehensive transformations of a major U.S. corporation, including its purchase of CBS Corporation, as the company was renamed. He retired from CBS in December 1998, became a private investor and authored a mystery novel.

In 2003, the board of Electronic Data Systems asked Jordan to lead the company. As Chairman and CEO, he led a financial and operational turnaround. In 2007, he stepped down as head of Electronic Data Systems but remained with the company as Chairman Emeritus until it was purchased by Hewlett Packard in 2008.

Jordan served on several corporate, private and non-profit boards. In 1992, he joined the Dell Computer Corporation’s Board of Directors, where he served until 2003. From 1992 to 2007, he served on the Board of Directors at Aetna. After his retirement from CBS, Jordan became chairman of two companies, Luminant Worldwide Corporation in Dallas, where he served from 1999 to 2001, and eOriginal Inc., a Baltimore company on whose board he remained. He also served on the boards of several smaller, privately held companies, including BlackLight Power, Inc. (now Brilliant Light Power, Inc.) located in Cranbury, NJ. He was also a board member of WPP Group plc.

He served on the board of the Center for Excellence in Education and was its chairman from 1988 to 1992. In 1986, he joined the Board of the United Negro College Fund, and from 1994 to 2004, he served as its Chairman. He was a member of the Yale School of Management Advisory Board and Chairman of the Yale University Council Committee on Engineering and Applied Science.

Michael was a member of the President's Export Council under the Clinton Administration, and chairman of its Subcommittee on Export Administration. He was a member of the Council of Retired Chief Executives, a former chairman of the National Foreign Trade Council; a member of the Council on Foreign Relations; a trustee of The Brookings Institution; a member and former chairman of the U.S.-Japan Business Council; a former member of The Business Council; a member of the board of trustees of the United States Council for International Business; a member of the International Advisory Board of British-American Business Inc.; and a former member of the Business Roundtable.

== Death ==
He died of neuroendocrine cancer on May 25, 2010, at the age of 73.

== Other ==
Bloomberg Business Week: Executive Profile.
