= Katherine Reback =

American screenwriter

Katherine Reback (1950/51 – May 24, 2010) was an American screenwriter, best known for the screenplay of the 1997 romantic comedy Fools Rush In and for penning the production draft of the 1983 film, Flashdance.

Reback was a native of Stamford, Connecticut. She received her bachelor's degree from Columbia University. She launched her career in the mid-1970s, while working for Alan King in New York City. Reback also began writing for such television shows as The Line and One Day at a Time.

In 1980, Reback relocated to California. In addition to screenwriting, Reback contributed to Bill Clinton's speech writing team during his 1992 presidential campaign.

Reback worked as a writer for Fox Television Studios for the last fifteen years of her life, until her death in 2010.

Reback died of cancer on May 24, 2010, in Los Angeles at age 59.
