= Wow (band) =

WOW!
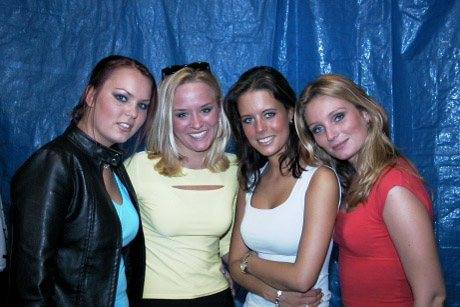
- From left to right: Naomi Louwerens, Mandy Gruijters, Denise Koopal and Jenske Moermond in 2001

Background information
- Origin: Netherlands
- Genres: Pop
- Years active: 1996–2001
- Labels: B&B (1996–1997); Bunny (1997–1998); Dino (1998–2001)

WOW! was a Dutch girl group in the late 1990s and early 2000s who were produced by the duo Bolland & Bolland.

== History ==
WOW! scored their first hit in 1997 called Keer op Keer, which came from their album Wild + Ondeugend. The group scored another hit with Zomer'. The music video for The Night Before You Came was recorded in the Big Brother house.

The band consisted of Denise Koopal, Jenske Moermond, Joëlle van Noppen, Mandy Gruijters and Naomi Louwerens. After each other, Van Noppen and Koopal left the group in 1999 and 2000 respectively. The band restarted in May 2001 under the new name Blaze. However, this was unsuccessful.

WOW! appeared for the last time in its original line-up once in the radio program Coen and Sander Show.

== Members ==
- Denise Koopal
- Jenske Moermond
- Mandy Gruijters
- Naomi Louwerens
- Joëlle van Noppen

== After WOW! ==
Denise Koopal presented call games for RTL. Mandy Gruijters went to sing in the coverband Broadway and was the finalist of Popstars 2. Joëlle van Noppen died in the Afriqiyah Airways Flight 771 plane crash on 12 May 2010.

== Discography ==
=== Albums ===
| Album with any hit notation (s) in the Dutch Album Top 100 | Date of appearance | Date of entry | Highest position | Number of weeks | Comments |
|---|---|---|---|---|---|
| Wild en ondeugend | 1997 | 15-11-1997 | 43 | 8 | |

=== Singles ===
| Single with possible hit notation (s) in the Dutch Top 40S | Date of appearance | Date of entry | Highest position | Number of weeks | Comments |
|---|---|---|---|---|---|
| Keer op keer | 1997 | 07-06-1997 | 16 | 9 | |
| Zomer | 1997 | 09-08-1997 | 28 | 5 | |
| Lekker lang lekker | 1997 | | - | - | |
| Zacht en teder | 1997 | | - | - | |
| Big Beat Boy | 1998 | | - | - | |
| The night before you came | 2000 | | - | - | |
