= Bilgəh =

Bilgah Bilgəh
- Municipality
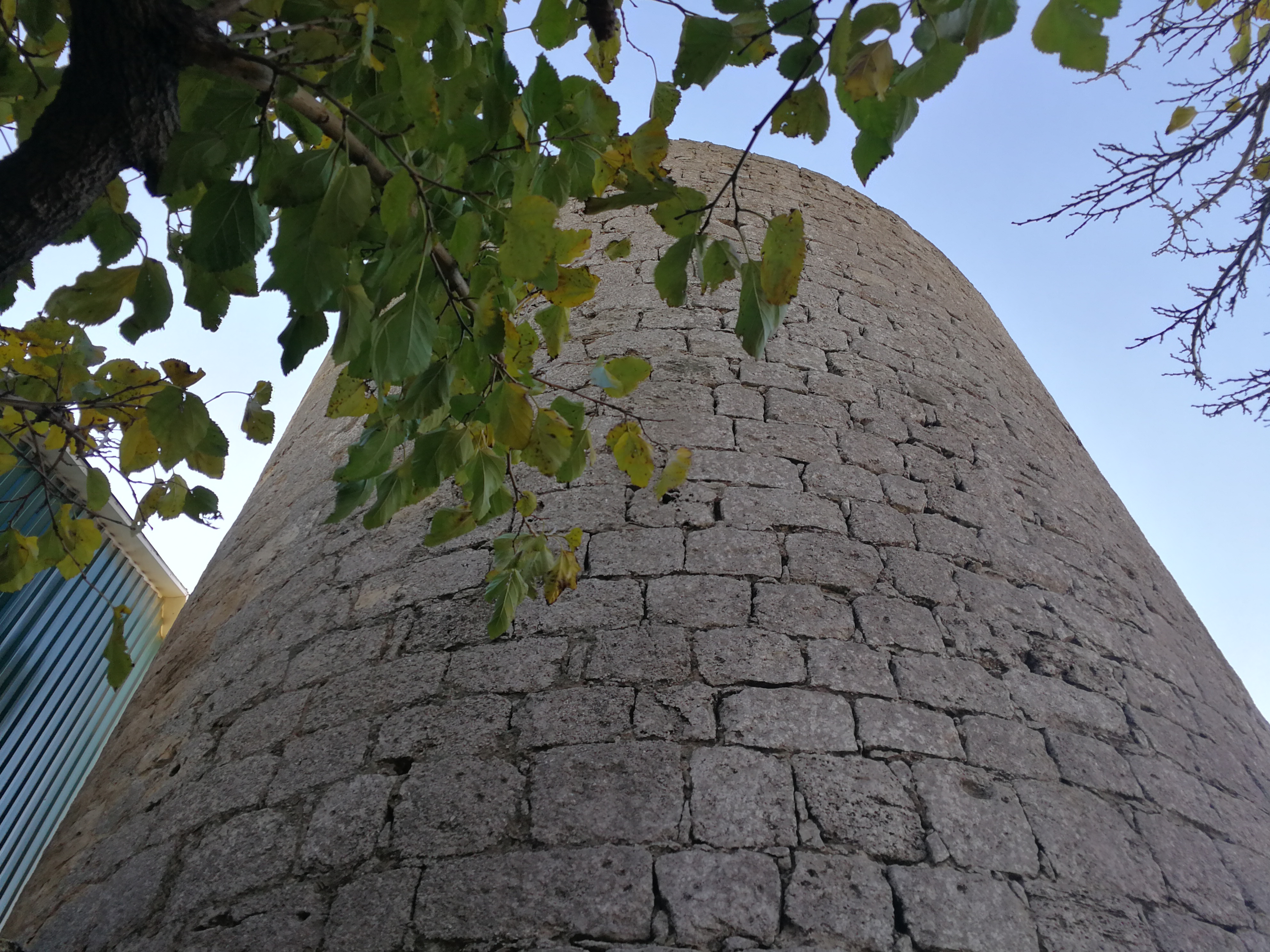
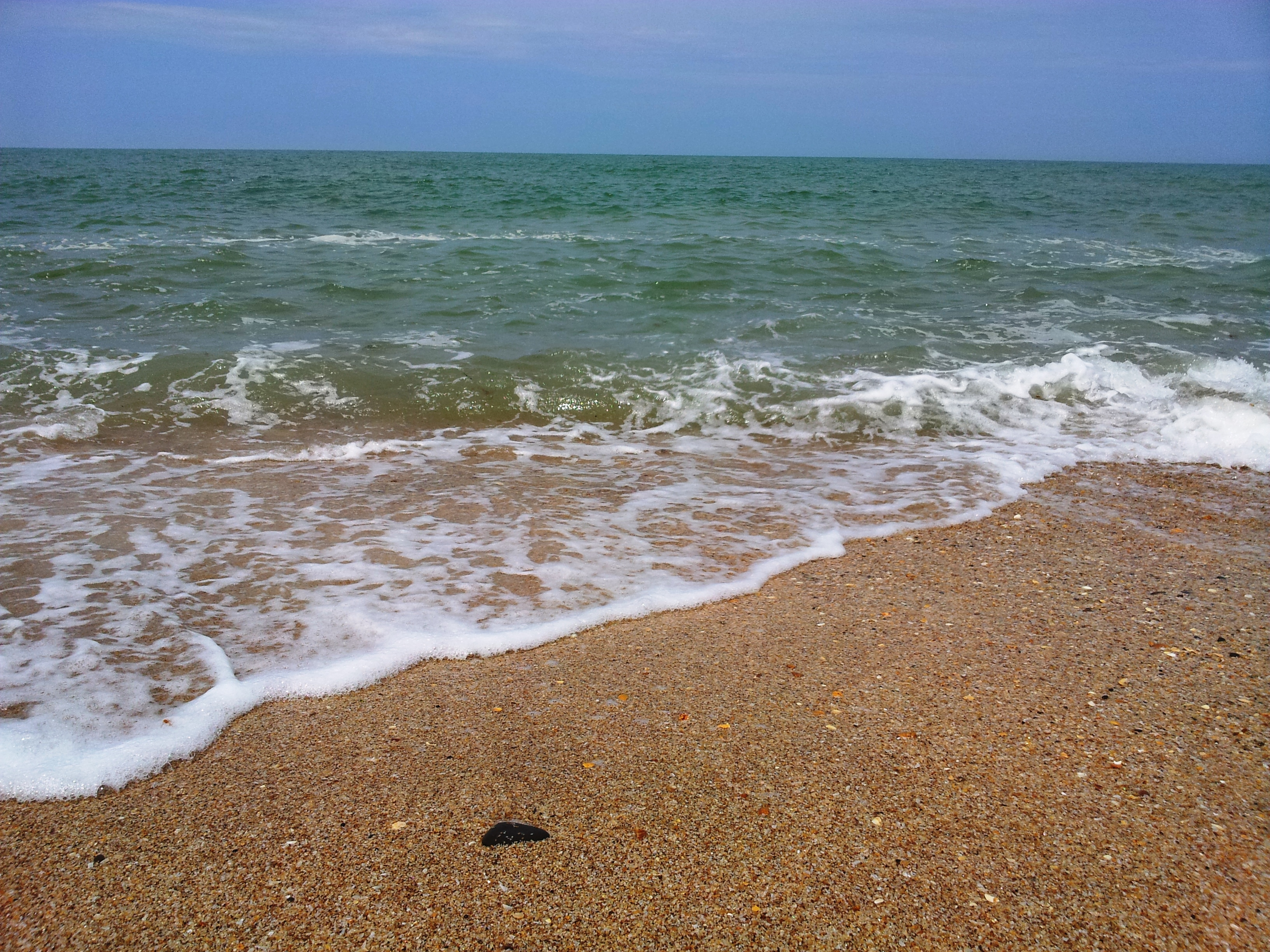
- Jumeirah Bilgah Beach Hotel Bilgah Tower Bilgah Seaside

- Location within Azerbaijan
- Coordinates: 40°34′05″N 50°02′16″E
- Country: Azerbaijan
- City: Baku
- District: Sabunçu

Population (2013)
  - Total: 8,300
- Time zone: UTC+4 (AZT)
  - Summer (DST): UTC+5 (AZT)

Bilgah (also, Bilqəx, Bilqäx, Bil’gya, Bil’gyakh, Bil’gykh, and Bilajer) a settlement and municipality in Baku, Azerbaijan that has become a part of Sabunchu District since 1937. It has a population of 8,300 (2013).

== History ==
Bilgah is one of the oldest settlements of Baku. The name of the area derives from “Pilegah” which means “the place where silk is made”. Apparently, there were cocoon plantations here in antique times.

== Culture ==
The presence of rock engravings indicates the existence of urban culture here since medieval times. Europeans travelers visiting the country had also mentioned the name of the place. The remains of the medieval monuments that have survived until our times also manifest the ancient history of the settlement.

== Geography and climate ==
Located to north-east of Baku, on the coastline of the Caspian Sea, Bilgah is bordered with Mashtagha, Nardaran and Kurdhakan settlements. Rich with cultural monuments, Bilgah has been distinguished for such industries as carpet-making, silkworm breeding, weaving. It has also been renowned for its fig, vintage, pomegranate and pistachio as well as vast saffron plantations. It also functioned as a port city. Other features of the area are its healthy climate, clean atmosphere and nature. Once very popular in the former USSR is the Bilgah Cardiological Resort which functions nowadays. It was founded in 1936 and started functioning after WW II

== Gallery ==
Bilgah Beach Hotel

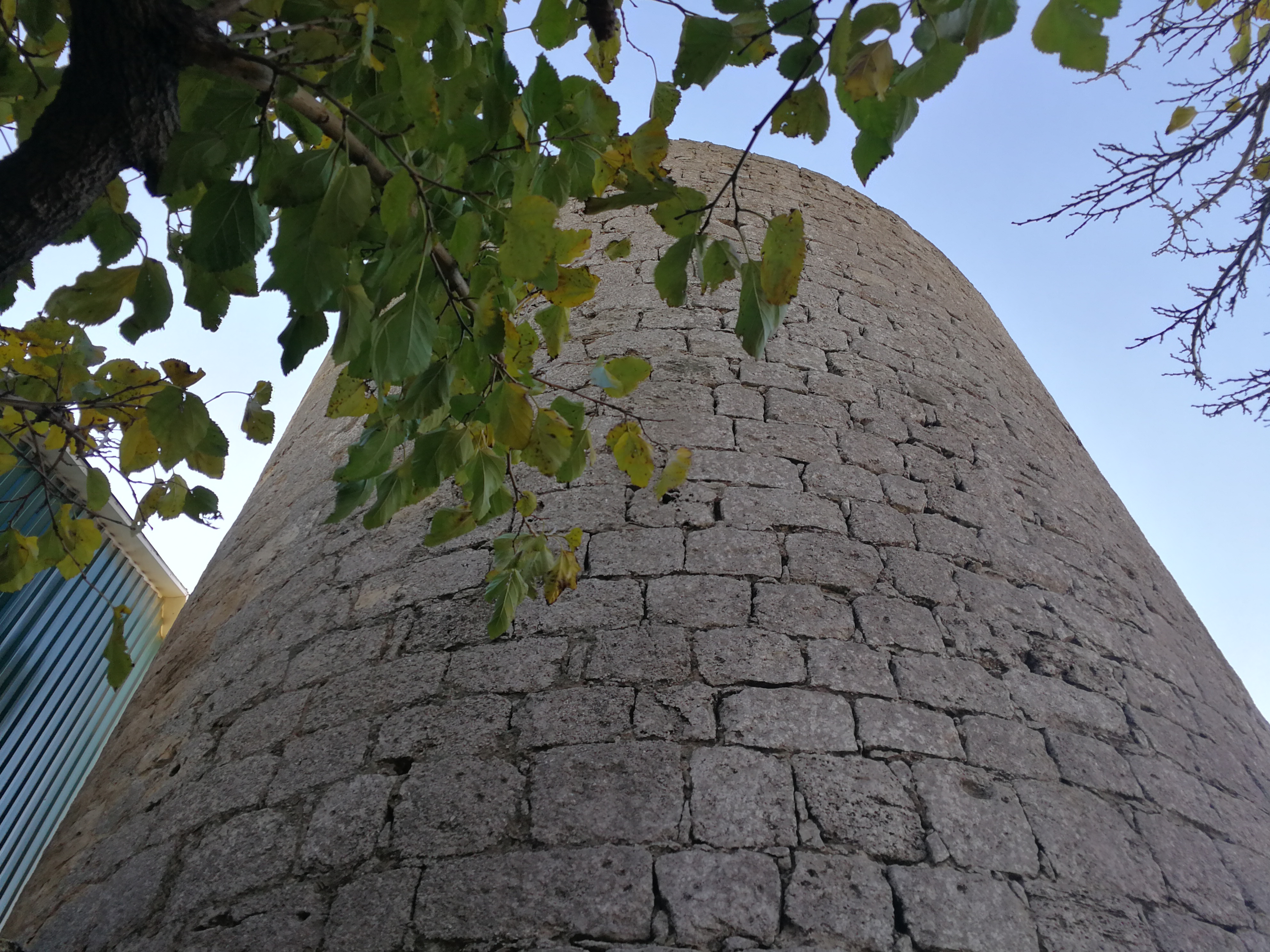
Bilgah Castle

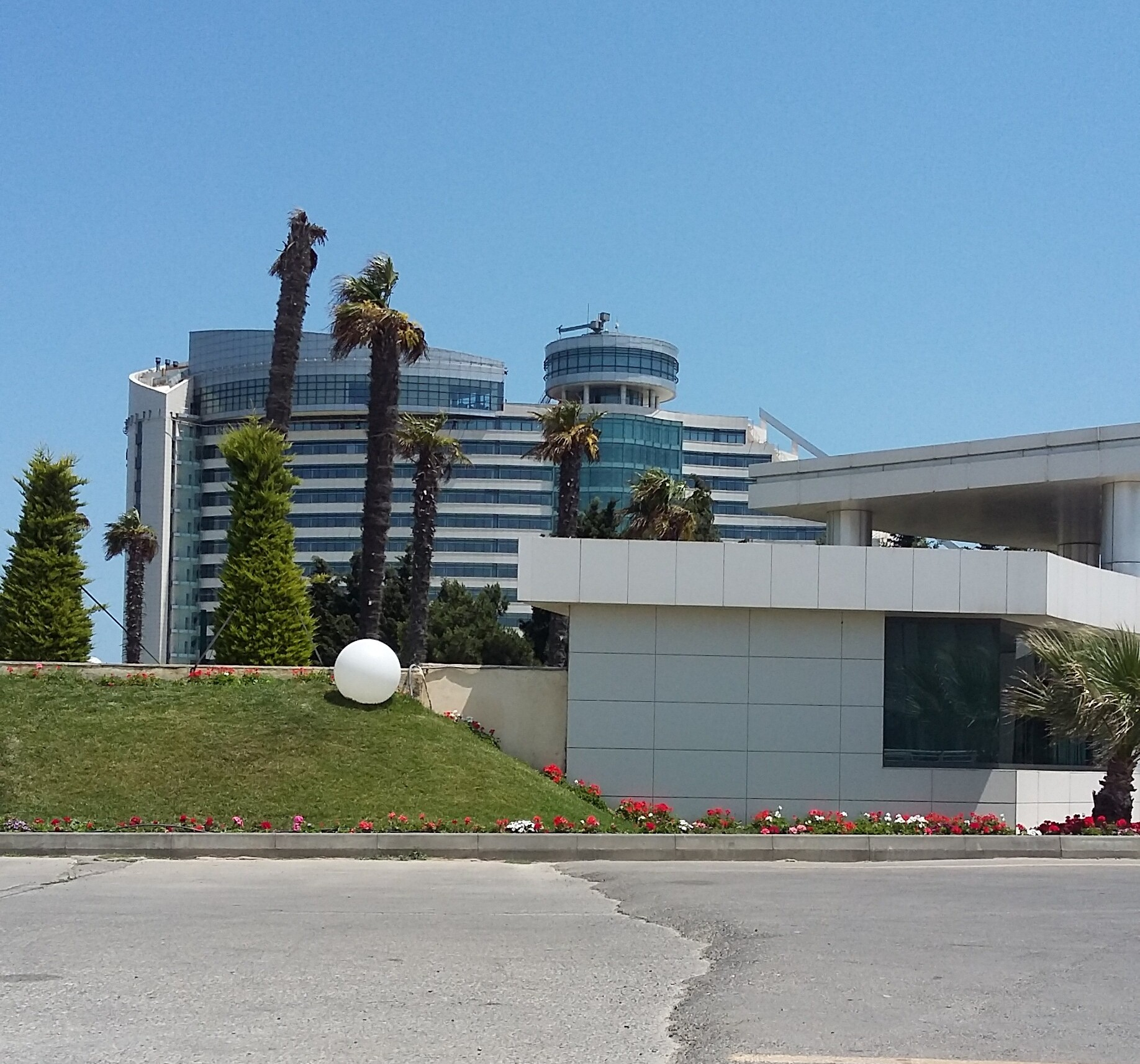

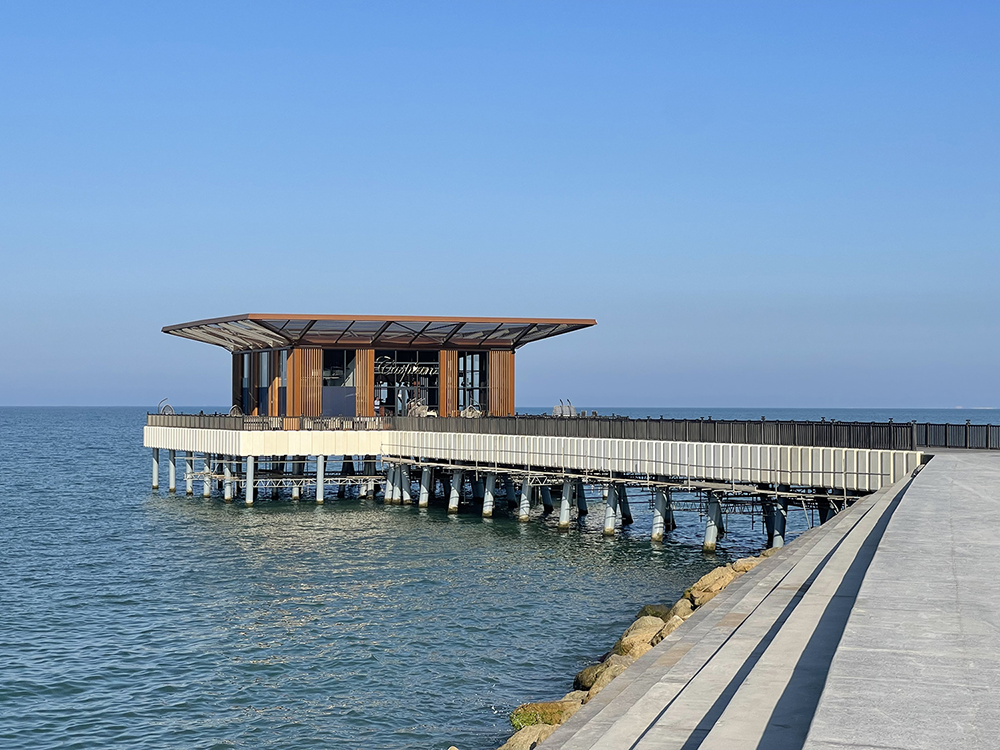
- Bilgəh at GEOnet Names Server
