= 2010 in Germany =

- Decades: 1990s; 2000s; 2010s; 2020s; 2030s
- See also: Other events of 2010; History of Germany; Timeline; Years

The following is a list of events from the year 2010 in Germany.

== Incumbents ==
=== Federal level ===
- President:
  - Horst Köhler (until 31 May 2010)
  - Jens Böhrnsen (Acting; 31 May – 30 June 2010)
  - Christian Wulff (from 30 June 2010)
- Chancellor: Angela Merkel

== Events ==
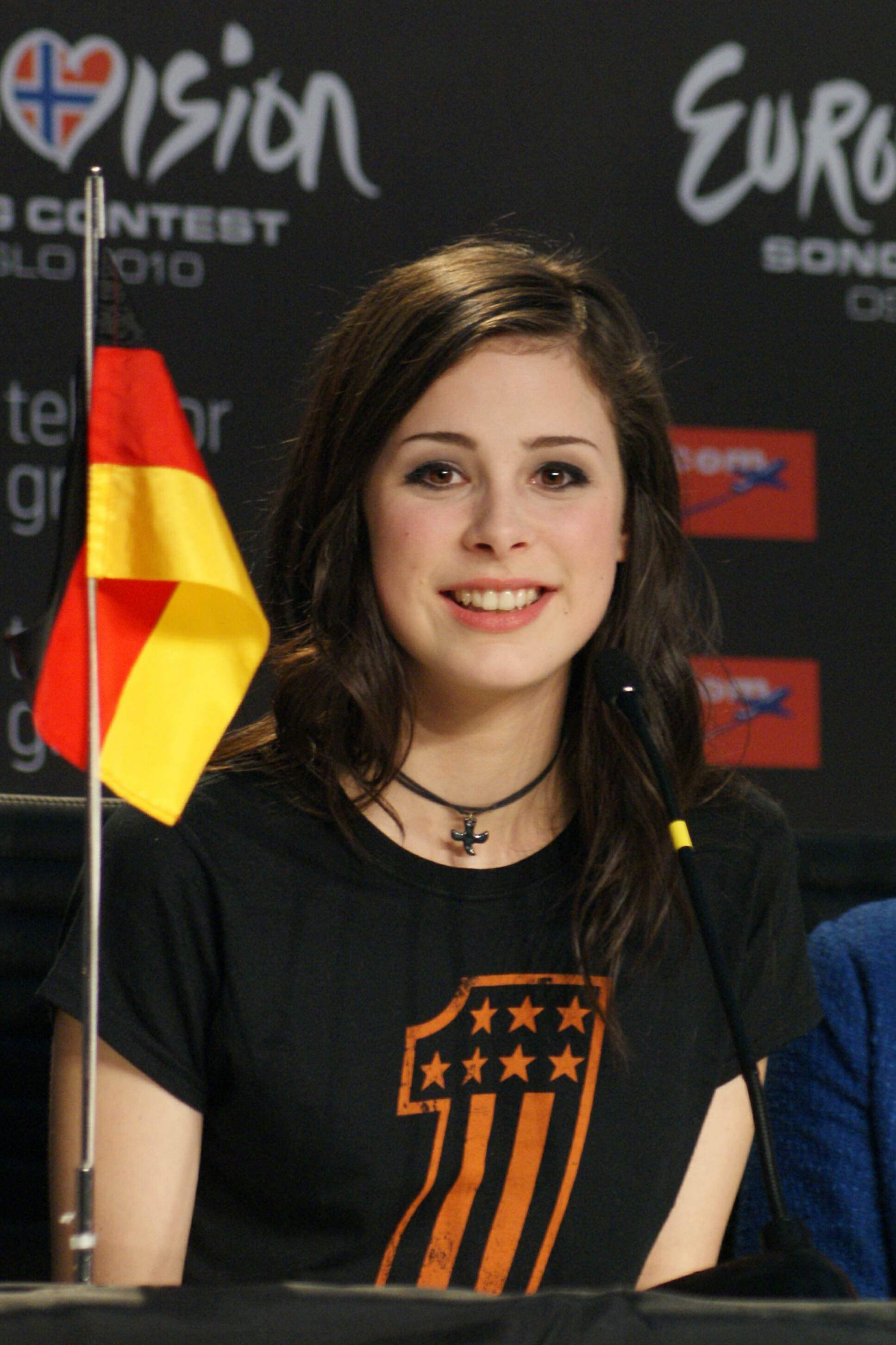
Germany's Lena wins the Eurovision Song Contest 2010

- 16 January – The German government asks its citizens to stop using Microsoft's web browser Internet Explorer to protect their own security.
- 22 January – A Nuremberg court issues an arrest warrant for former Argentine leader Jorge Rafael Videla, on suspicion of killing a German man.
- 11–21 February – 60th Berlin International Film Festival
- 13 February – More than 10,000 anti-fascist protesters successfully block a planned neo-Nazi march in Dresden.
- 4 April – Three car bombs hit the Egyptian, German and Iranian embassies in the centre of the Iraqi capital, Baghdad, in quick succession, killing at least 30 people.
- 29 May – With the song "Satellite", Germany's Lena wins the Eurovision Song Contest 2010, the first German victory since 1982.
- 25 June – Germany's TanDEM-X satellite, whose aim it is to create the most precise 3D map of Earth's surface, obtains its first images.
- 30 June — Christian Wulff is elected President of Germany.
- 4 July – In a referendum, voters in the German state of Bavaria vote to ban smoking at all pubs and restaurants.
- 7 July – Spain defeats Germany 1–0 to win its semi-final and for its first time, along with Netherlands make the 2010 FIFA World Cup Final.
- 10 July – 2010 FIFA World Cup: Germany defeats Uruguay 3–2 to finish third.
- 12 July – At least eight people are injured after a tornado strikes the German island of Duene in the North Sea.
- 24 July – A massive stampede at the 2010 Love Parade in Duisburg kills 20 people and injures dozens more people.
- 8 August – Dutch rider Ellen van Dijk wins the 2010 Sparkassen Giro.
- 26 August – German HIV-positive pop singer Nadja Benaissa is found guilty of grievous bodily harm after transmitting HIV to a man who had unprotected sex with her without her telling him of her condition.
- 21–26 September – photokina in Cologne
- 3 October
  - Germany celebrates 20 years of unification.
  - The German government pays its last World War I reparations.
- 21 October – Freck Langsam, German no-budget Gangster Comedy film is released.
- 26 October – The number of unemployed in Germany drops first time since 1991 below three million.
- 1 November – German identity cards are issued in the ISO/IEC 7810 ID-1 format and contain RFID chips with personally identifiable information including a biometric Photo and, if desired, two fingerprints.

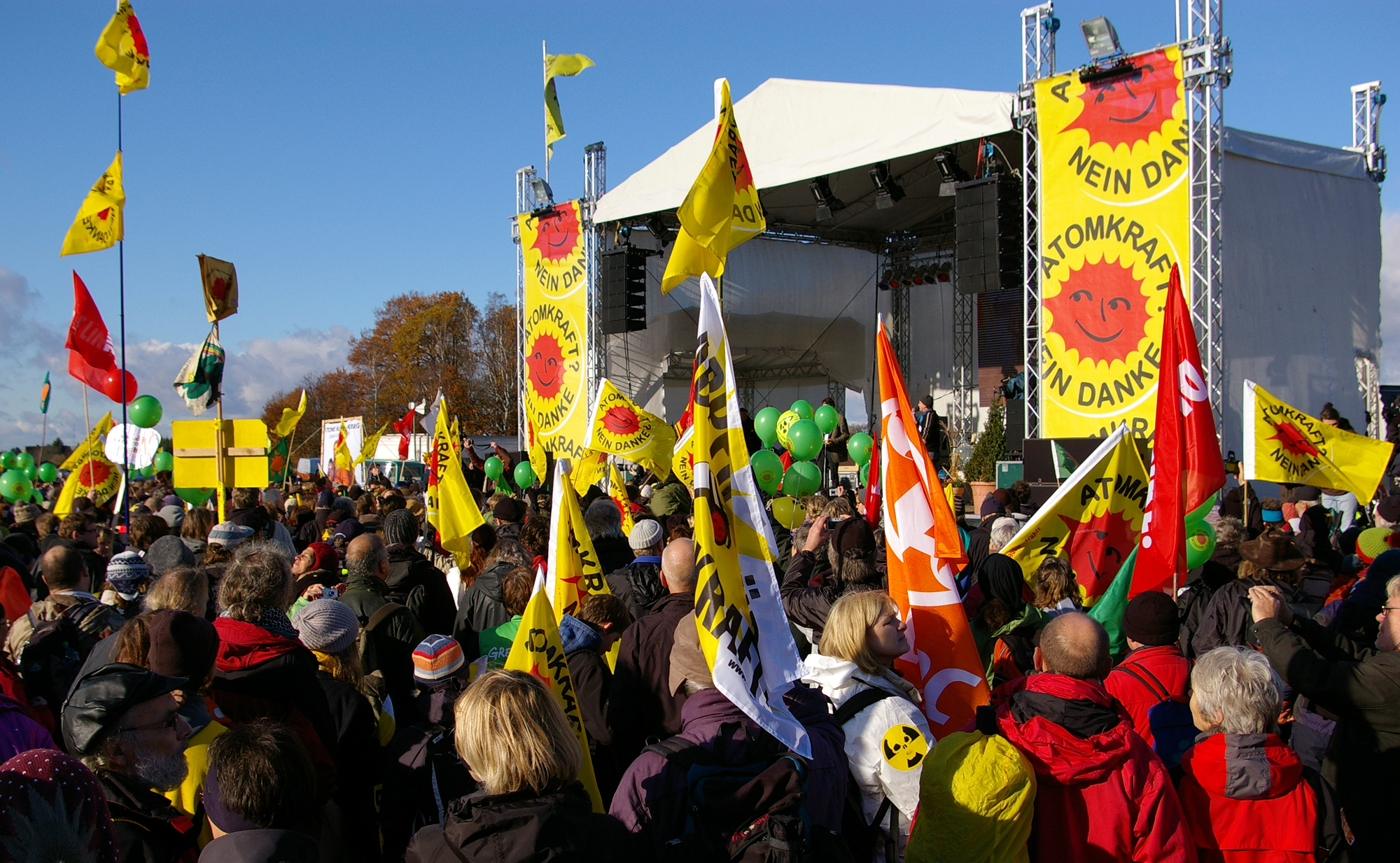
Anti-Atomkraft-Demonstration in Wendland (2010)

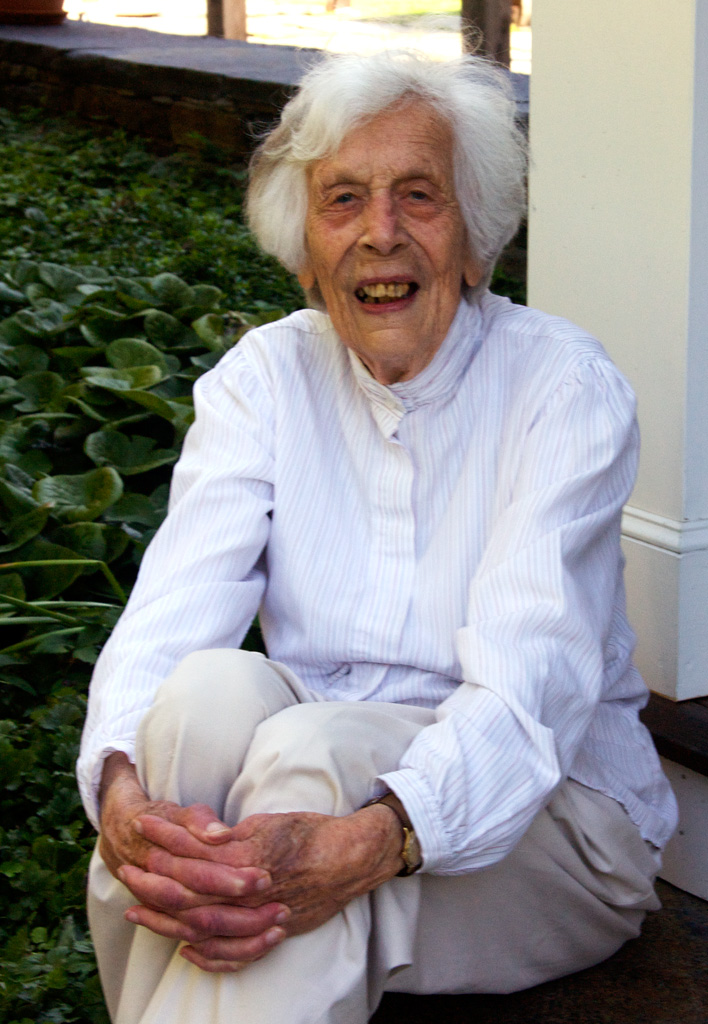
Freya von Moltke Photo: Dorothea von Haeften

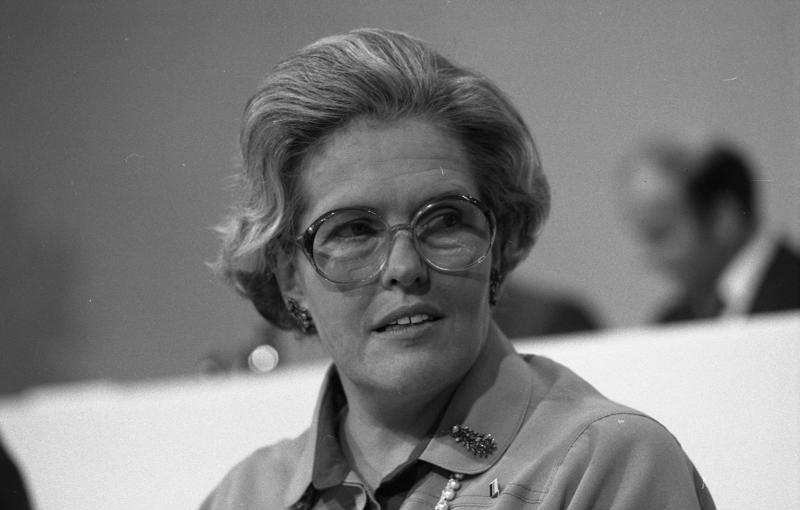
Hanna-Renate Laurien

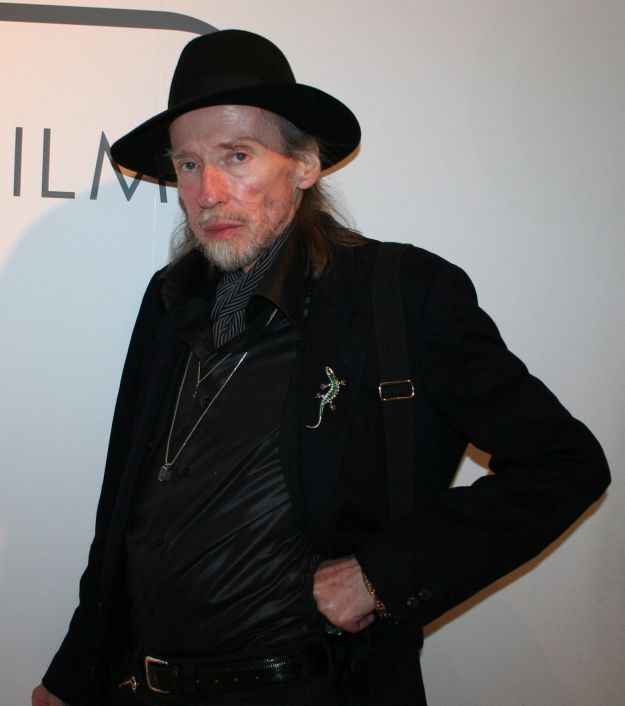
Werner Schroeter

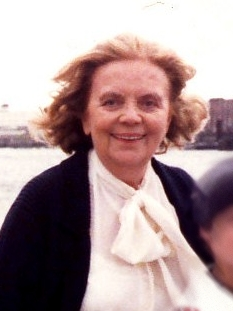
Heidi Kabel

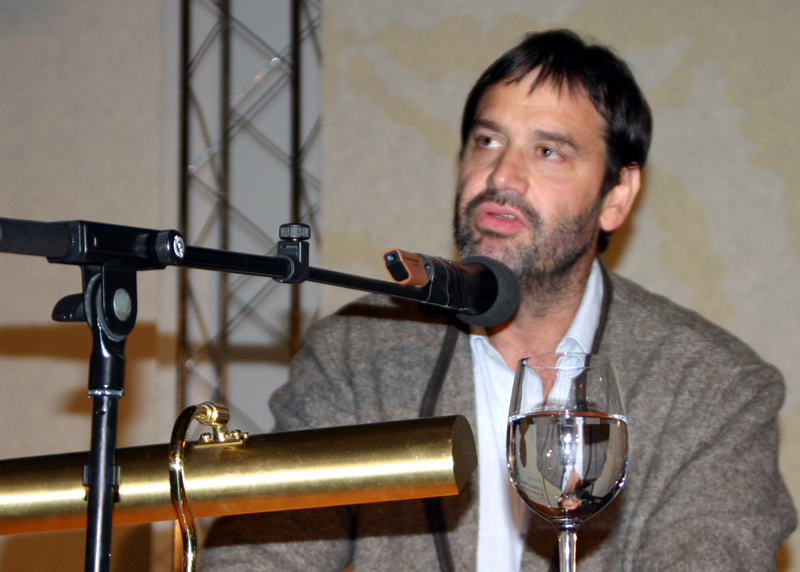
Sepp Daxenberger

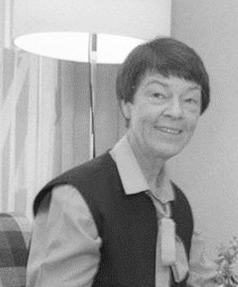
Loki Schmidt

- 9 November – Demonstrations in Wendland near Gorleben against CASTOR-transport.
- 29 November – Break of coalition in Hamburg between the Green and CDU parties.
- December – The German Meteorological Service, Deutsche Wetterdienst, says December was the coldest December month since 1969 in Germany.

== Deaths ==
=== January ===
- 1 January
  - Marlene Neubauer-Woerner, 91, German sculptor (b. 1918)
  - Freya von Moltke, 98, German World War II resistance fighter (b. 1911)
- 4 January – Ludwig Wilding, 82, German artist (b. 1927)
- 9 January
  - Franz-Hermann Brüner, 64, German head of OLAF (b. 1945)
  - Diether Posser, 87, German politician (b. 1922)
- 14 January
  - Katharina Rutschky, 68, German educationalist and author (b. 1941)
  - Petra Schürmann, 74, German television presenter, Miss World 1956 (b. 1933)
- 15 January – Detlev Lauscher, 57, German footballer (b. 1952)
- 18 January – Günter Mielke, 67, German Olympic athlete (b. 1942)
- 30 January – Ruth Cohn, 97, German psychotherapist (b. 1912)
- 31 January – Erna Baumbauer, 91, German casting agent (b. 1919)

=== February ===
- 10 February – Michael Palme, 66, German sportswriter and host (b. 1943)
- 12 February – Werner Krämer, 70, German footballer (b. 1940)
- 14 February – Rosa Rein, 112, German-born Swiss supercentenarian (b. 1897)
- 16 February – Ino Kolbe, 95, German Esperanto expert (b. 1914)
- 17 February – Ines Paulke, 51, German rock and roll singer and songwriter, suicide (b. 1958)
- 18 February – Erwin Bachmann, 88, German Waffen-SS officer (b. 1921)
- 21 February – Casimir Johannes Prinz zu Sayn-Wittgenstein-Berleburg, 93, German politician (b. 1917)
- 23 February
  - Gerhardt Neef, 63, German footballer (Rangers), (b. 1946)
  - Henri Salmide, 90, German World War II naval officer, saved Bordeaux port from destruction (b. 1919)
- 27 February – David Bankier, 63, German-born Israeli Holocaust scholar (b. 1947)

=== March ===
- 5 March – Wolfgang Schenck, 97, German airman, Luftwaffe flying ace (b. 1913)
- 12 March – Hanna-Renate Laurien, 81, German politician (b. 1928)
- 14 March – Konrad Ruhland, 78, German musicologist (b. 1932)
- 20 March – Erwin Lehn, 90, German musician and conductor (b. 1919)
- 21 March – Wolfgang Wagner, 90, German director (Bayreuth Festival) (b. 1919)
- 22 March – Emil Schulz, 71, German boxer (b. 1938)
- 25 March – Elisabeth Noelle-Neumann, 93, German political scientist (b. 1916)
- 27 March – Peter Herbolzheimer, 74, German jazz musician (b. 1935)
- 30 March
  - Alfred Ambs, 87, German World War II flying ace (b. 1923)
  - Josef Homeyer, 80, German Roman Catholic prelate, Bishop of Hildesheim (1983–2004) (b. 1983)
  - Martin Sandberger, 98, German Nazi leader and Holocaust perpetrator (b. 1911)
- 31 March – Ludwig Martin, German lawyer (b. 1909)

=== April ===
- 3 April – Ferdinand Simoneit, 84, German journalist, author and World War II veteran (b. 1925)
- 4 April
  - Friedrich Wilhelm Schäfke, 87, German mathematician and academic (b. 1922)
  - Erich Zenger, 70, German Roman Catholic theologian and bible scholar (b. 1939)
- 5 April
  - Günther C. Kirchberger, 81, German academic and painter (b. 1928)
  - Gisela Trowe, 86, German actress (b. 1922)
- 6 April – Hans Schröder, 79, German sculptor and painter (b. 1931)
- 8 April – Andreas Kunze, 57, German actor (b. 1952)
- 9 April – Gisela Karau, 78, German author, editor and columnist (b. 1932)
- 10 April
  - Martin Ostwald, 88, German-born American classics scholar (b. 1922)
  - Manfred Reichert, 69, German footballer (b. 1940)
- 11 April
  - Gerhard Geise, 80, German mathematician (b. 1930)
  - Hans-Joachim Göring, 86, German footballer and coach (b. 1923)
  - Gert Haller, 65, German business manager, lobbyist and politician (b. 1944)
  - Theodor Homann, 61, German footballer (b. 1948)
  - Egon Hugenschmidt, 84, German jurist and politician (b. 1925)
- 12 April
  - Ambrosius Eßer, 76, German Dominican clergy and church historian (b. 1933)
  - Wolfgang Graßl, 40, German skier and coach (b. 1970)
  - Werner Schroeter, 65, German film director (b. 1945)
- 14 April – Stefan Schmitt, 46, German jurist and politician (b. 1963)
- 15 April – Wilhelm Huxhorn, 54, German footballer (b. 1955)
- 17 April – Josef W. Janker, 87, German author, journalist and World War II veteran (b. 1922)
- 21 April – Manfred Kallenbach, 68, German footballer, heart failure (b. 1942)
- 24 April
  - Leo Löwenstein, 43, German racing driver (b. 1966)
  - Paul Schäfer, 88, German religious sect founder and former Nazi army corporal (b. 1921)
- 30 April – Paul Mayer, 98, German Roman Catholic prelate and cardinal (b. 1911)

=== May ===
- 3 May
  - Stefan Doernberg, 85, German writer and teacher (b. 1924)
  - Guenter Wendt, 85, German-born American spacecraft engineer (NASA) (b. 1923)
- 4 May – Freddy Kottulinsky, 77, German-born Swedish racing driver (b. 1932)
- 5 May – Alfons Kontarsky, 77, German pianist (b. 1931)
- 8 May – Peer Schmidt, 84, German actor (b. 1926)
- 9 May – Karl-Heinz Schnibbe, 86, German partisan, World War II resistance fighter (b. 1924)
- 12 May
  - Dieter Bock, 71, German businessman and multimillionaire (b. 1938)
  - Edith Keller-Herrmann, 88, German chess Grandmaster (b. 1921)
- 13 May
  - Walter Klimmek, 91, German footballer (b. 1919)
  - Klaus Kotter, 75, German bobsleigh official (b. 1934)
- 15 May – Christian Habicht, 57, German actor (b. 1952)
- 17 May
  - Ludwig von Friedeburg, 85, German politician and sociologist, Hesse Minister for Education (1969–1974) (b. 1924)
  - Fritz Sennheiser, 98, German electrical engineer and entrepreneur, founder of Sennheiser (b. 1912)
- 23 May – Eva Ostwalt, 108, German-born American Holocaust survivor (b. 1902)
- 24 May – Anneliese Rothenberger, 83, German opera singer (b. 1919)
- 29 May – Paul Müller, 69, German biologist (b. 1940)

=== June ===
- 10 June – Sigmar Polke, 69, German painter and photographer (b. 1941)
- 12 June – Daisy D'ora, 97, German actress and socialite (b. 1913)
- 13 June – Ernest Fleischmann, 85, German-born American impresario, executive director of the Los Angeles Philharmonic (b. 1924)
- 15 June – Heidi Kabel, 95, German stage actress (b. 1914)
- 18 June – Hans Joachim Sewering, 94, German physician, member of the Waffen SS (1933–1945) (b. 1916)
- 19 June – Ursula Thiess, 86, German artist and actress (Bengal Brigade) (b. 1924)
- 21 June – Wilfried Feldenkirchen, 62, German economic historian and project manager (Siemens) (b. 1947)
- 22 June
  - Marie-Luise Jahn, 92, German activist, member of the anti-Nazi resistance movement White Rose (b. 1918)
  - Manfred Römbell, 68, German writer (b. 1941)
- 23 June
  - Jörg Berger, 65, German football manager (b. 1944)
  - Frank Giering, 38, German actor (Funny Games) (b. 1971)
- 28 June
  - Willie Huber, 52, German-born Canadian ice hockey player (Detroit Red Wings) (b. 1958)
  - Kirsten Heisig, 48, German politician and juvenile magistrate (b. 1961)

=== July ===
- 2 July – Carl Adam Petri, 83, German computer scientist (b. 1926)
- 3 July – Herbert Erhardt, 79, German footballer, FIFA World Cup winner 1954 (b. 1930)
- 12 July – Günter Behnisch, 88, German architect (b. 1922)
- 22 July – Herbert Giersch, 89, German economist (b. 1921)
- 24 July – Theo Albrecht, 88, German entrepreneur and billionaire (Aldi Nord, Trader Joe's) (b. 1922)
- 25 July – Erich Steidtmann, 95, German Nazi SS officer (b. 1914)
- 30 July – Otto Joachim, 99, German-born Canadian violist and composer of electronic music (b. 1910)

=== August ===
- 5 August – Jürgen Oesten, 96, German U-boat commander during World War II (b. 1913)
- 7 August – Jürgen Thimme, 92, German archaeologist and U-boat commander (b. 1917)
- 8 August – Bernhard Philberth, 83, German physicist, engineer, philosopher and theologian (b. 1927)
- 11 August – Bruno Schleinstein, 78, German actor (b. 1932)
- 12 August – Manfred Homberg, German boxer (b. 1933)
- 18 August
  - Maria Wachter, 100, German communist and resistance fighter, member of VVN (b. 1910)
  - Sepp Daxenberger, 48, German politician (b. 1962)
- 19 August – Gerhard Beil, 84, East German politician (b. 1926)
- 21 August – Christoph Schlingensief, 49, German film and theatre director (b. 1960)
- 26 August – Walter Wolfrum, 87, German World War II Luftwaffe fighter ace (b. 1923)

=== September ===
- 7 September – Eberhard von Brauchitsch, 83, German industrial manager (b. 1926)
- 11 September – Baerbel Bohley, 65, East German opposition figure & artist (b. 1945)
- 16 September – Friedrich Wilhelm, Prince of Hohenzollern, 86, German nobleman (b. 1924)
- 18 September – Egon Klepsch, 80, German politician (b. 1930)

=== October ===
- 14 October – Hermann Scheer, 66, German politician (b. 1944)
- 21 October – Loki Schmidt, 91, German environmentalist and wife of Helmut Schmidt (b. 1919)

=== November ===
- 5 November – Hajo Herrmann, 97, German Luftwaffe pilot (b. 1913)
- 6 November – Ezard Haußmann, 75, German actor (b. 1935)
- 15 November – Andreas Kirchner, 57, German Winter sportsman (b. 1953)
- 20 November
  - Walter Helmut Fritz, German author (b. 1929)
  - Heinz Weiss, German actor (b. 1921)
- 26 November – Maria Hellwig, 90, German singer (b. 1920)
- 30 November – Peter Hofmann, 76, German singer (b. 1944)

=== December ===
- 7 December
  - Armin Weiss, 83, chemist and politician (b. 1927)
  - Arnold Weiss, 86, German-born American soldier (b. 1924)
- 15 December – Hans-Joachim Rauschenbach, 87, German sport journalist (b. 1923)
- 17 December – Mikhail Umansky, 58, Russian-born German chess grandmaster (b. 1952)
- 20 December - Katharina Szelinski-Singer, 92, German sculptor (b. 1918)

== See also ==
- 2010 in German television
- Germany at the 2010 Winter Olympics
