= 2010 in association football =

The following are the association football events of the year 2010 throughout the world.

== Events ==
=== Men's national teams ===
==== FIFA ====
- 11 June – 11 July: 2010 FIFA World Cup in South Africa
  - (gold) Spain
  - (silver) Netherlands
  - (bronze) Germany
  - 4th: Uruguay
- 14 August – 22 August: 2010 IBSA World Blind Football Championship in England
  - (gold) Brazil
  - (silver) Spain
  - (bronze) China
  - 4th: England

==== CAF ====
- 10 January – 31 January: 2010 African Cup of Nations in Angola
  - (gold) Egypt
  - (silver) Ghana
  - (bronze) Nigeria
  - 4th: Algeria

==== AFC ====
- December 1–29: 2010 AFF Suzuki Cup in Indonesia and Vietnam
  - (gold) Winners: Malaysia
  - (silver) Runners-up: Indonesia
  - (bronze) Third place: Philippines, Vietnam

=== Women's national teams ===
- 24 February – 3 March: 2010 Algarve Cup in Portugal
  - (gold) United States
  - (silver) Germany
  - (bronze) Sweden
  - 4th: China
- 4–21 November 2010: 2010 South American Women's Football Championship in Ecuador
  - (gold) Brazil
  - (silver) Colombia
  - (bronze) Chile
  - 4th: Argentina

=== Women's youth ===
- July 13 – August 1: 2010 FIFA U-20 Women's World Cup in Germany
  - (gold) Germany
  - (silver) Nigeria
  - (bronze) South Korea
  - 4th: Colombia
- 5 September - 25 September: 2010 FIFA U-17 Women's World Cup in Trinidad and Tobago
  - (gold) South Korea
  - (silver) Japan
  - (bronze) Spain
  - 4th: North Korea
- March 3 - March 17: 2010 South American U-20 Women Championship in Colombia
  - (gold) Brazil
  - (silver) Colombia
  - (bronze) Paraguay
  - 4th: Chile

=== Multi-sports events ===
==== Men ====
- August 12–25: 2010 Summer Youth Olympics in Singapore
  - (gold) Bolivia
  - (silver) Haiti
  - (bronze) Singapore
  - 4th: Montenegro
- November 7–25: 2010 Asian Games in Guangzhou, China
  - (gold) Japan
  - (silver) United Arab Emirates
  - (bronze) South Korea
  - 4th: Iran

==== Women ====
- August 12–24: 2010 Summer Youth Olympics in Singapore
  - (gold) Chile
  - (silver) Equatorial Guinea
  - (bronze) Turkey
  - 4th: Iran
- November 14–22: 2010 Asian Games in Guangzhou, China
  - (gold) Japan
  - (silver) North Korea
  - (bronze) South Korea
  - 4th: China

== Club football ==
| Region | Tournament | Champion | Title | Last Honor |
|---|---|---|---|---|
| AFC (Asia) | 2010 AFC Champions League | (South Korea) Seongnam | 2nd | 1995 |
| AFC (Asia) | 2010 AFC Cup | (Syria) Aleppo | 1st | N/A |
| AFC (Asia) | 2010 AFC President's Cup | (Myanmar) Yadarnarbon | 1st | N/A |
| CAF (Africa) | 2010 CAF Champions League | (Democratic Republic of the Congo) TP Mazembe | 4th | 2009 |
| CAF (Africa) | 2010 CAF Confederation Cup | (Morocco) FUS Rabat | 1st | N/A |
| CAF (Africa) | 2010 CAF Super Cup | (Democratic Republic of the Congo) TP Mazembe | 1st | N/A |
| CONCACAF (North and Central America, Caribbean) | 2009–10 CONCACAF Champions League | (Mexico) Pachuca | 4th | 2008 |
| CONCACAF (North and Central America, Caribbean) | 2010 North American SuperLiga | (Mexico) Morelia | 1st | N/A |
| CONCACAF (North and Central America, Caribbean) | 2010 CFU Club Championship | Puerto Rico Islanders | 1st | N/A |
| CONMEBOL (South America) | 2010 Copa Libertadores | (Brazil) Internacional | 2nd | 2006 |
| CONMEBOL (South America) | 2010 Copa Sudamericana | (Argentina) Independiente | 1st | N/A |
| CONMEBOL (South America) | 2010 Recopa Sudamericana | (Ecuador) LDU Quito | 2nd | 2009 |
| OFC (Oceania) | 2009–10 OFC Champions League | (Papua New Guinea) PRK Hekari United | 1st | N/A |
| UEFA (Europe) | 2009–10 UEFA Champions League | (Italy) Inter Milan | 3rd | 1964–65 |
| UEFA (Europe) | 2009–10 UEFA Europa League | (Spain) Atlético Madrid | 1st | N/A |
| UEFA (Europe) | 2010 UEFA Super Cup | (Spain) Atlético Madrid | 1st | N/A |
| FIFA (Global) | 2010 FIFA Club World Cup | (Italy) Inter Milan | 1st | N/A |

=== Women ===
| Region | Tournament | Champion | Title | Last honor |
|---|---|---|---|---|
| CONMEBOL (South America) | 2010 Copa Libertadores Femenina | (Brazil) Santos | 2nd | 2009 Copa Libertadores Femenina |
| UEFA (Europe) | 2009–10 UEFA Women's Champions League | (Germany) Turbine Potsdam | 2nd | 2004–05 UEFA Women's Cup |

== National champions ==
FIFA Confederations: AFC • CAF • CONCACAF • CONMEBOL • OFC • UEFA

=== AFC ===
| Nation | League | Champion | Title | Last honor |
|---|---|---|---|---|
| Australia | 2009–10 A-League | Sydney FC | 1st | — |
| Bahrain | 2009–10 Bahrain First Division League | Al-Ahli Manama | 5th | 1995–96 |
| Bangladesh | 2009–10 Bangladesh League | Dhaka Abahani | 3rd | 2008–09 |
| Bhutan | 2010 Bhutan A-Division | Yeedzin | 2nd | 2008 |
| Brunei | 2009–10 Brunei Premier League | QAF FC | 3rd | 2007–08 |
| Cambodia | 2010 Cambodian League | Phnom Penh Crown | 3rd | 2008 |
| China | 2010 Chinese Super League | Shandong Luneng | 3rd | 2008 |
| Chinese Taipei | 2010 Intercity Football League | Kaohsiung County Taipower | 15th | 2008 |
| Guam | 2009–10 Guam Men's Soccer League | Quality Distributors | 4th | 2007–08 |
| Hong Kong | 2009–10 Hong Kong First Division League | South China | 40th | 2008–09 |
| India | 2009–10 I-League | Dempo | 2nd | 2007–08 |
| Indonesia | 2009–10 Indonesia Super League | Arema Indonesia | 1st | — |
| Iran | 2009–10 Persian Gulf Cup | Sepahan | 2nd | 2002–03 |
| Iraq | 2009–10 Iraqi Premier League | Duhok | 1st | — |
| Japan | 2010 J.League Division 1 | Nagoya Grampus | 1st | — |
| Jordan | 2009–10 Jordan League | Al-Faisaly | 31st | 2003–04 |
| North Korea | 2010 DPR Korea Football League | April 25 | 12st | 2003 |
| South Korea | 2011 K-League | FC Seoul | 4th | 2000 |
| Kuwait | 2009–10 Kuwaiti Premier League | Al-Qadsia | 13th | 2008–09 |
| Kyrgyzstan | 2010 Kyrgyzstan League | Neftchi Kochkor-Ata | 1st | — |
| Laos | 2010 Lao League | Lao Bank | 2nd | 2001 |
| Lebanon | 2009–10 Lebanese Premier League | Al Ahed | 2nd | 2007–08 |
| Macau | 2010 Campeonato da 1ª Divisão do Futebol | Ka I | 1st | — |
| Malaysia | 2010 Malaysia Super League | Selangor | 2nd | 2009 |
| Maldives | 2010 Dhivehi League | VB Sports Club | 2nd | 2009 |
| Mongolia | 2010 Mongolian Premier League | Khangarid | 4th | 2004 |
| Myanmar | 2009–10 Myanmar National League | Yadanarbon | 1st | — |
| Myanmar | 2010 Myanmar National League | Yadanarbon | 2nd | 2009–10 |
| Nepal | 2010 Martyr's Memorial A-Division League | Nepal Police Club | 4th | 2006–07 |
| Oman | 2009–10 Oman Mobile League | Al-Suwaiq | 1st | — |
| Pakistan | 2009–10 Pakistan Premier League | Khan Research Laboratories | 1st | — |
| Palestine | 2009–10 West Bank Premier League | Jabal Al-Mukaber Club | 1st | — |
| Philippines | 2010 United Football League | Philippine Air Force | 1st | — |
| Qatar | 2009–10 Qatar Stars League | Al-Gharafa | 1st | — |
| Saudi Arabia | 2009–10 Saudi Pro League | Al-Hilal | 12th | 2007–08 |
| Singapore | 2010 S.League | Etoile FC | 1st | — |
| Sri Lanka | 2010 Sri Lanka Champions League | Competition not held | | |
| Syria | 2009–10 Syrian Premier League | Al-Jaish | 11th | 2002–03 |
| Tajikistan | 2010 Tajik League | Esteghlal Dushanbe | 1st | — |
| Thailand | 2010 Thai Premier League | Muangthong United | 2nd | 2009 |
| Turkmenistan | 2010 Ýokary Liga | Balkan FK | 2nd | 2004 |
| United Arab Emirates | 2009–10 UAE Pro League | Al Wahda | 4th | 2004–05 UAE |
| Uzbekistan | 2010 Uzbek League | Bunyodkor | 3rd | 2009 |
| Vietnam | 2010 V-League | Hà Nội T&T F.C. | 1st | — |
| Yemen | 2009–10 Yemeni League | Al-Saqr | 2nd | 2006 |

=== CAF ===
| Nation | League | Champion | Title | Last honour |
|---|---|---|---|---|
| Algeria | 2009–10 Algerian Championnat National | MC Alger | 7th | 1998–99 |
| Angola | 2010 Girabola | Interclube | 2nd | 2007 |
| Benin | 2009–10 Benin Premier League | ASPAC | 1st | — |
| Botswana | 2009–10 Botswana Premier League | Township Rollers | 10th | 2005 |
| Burkina Faso | 2009–10 Burkinabé Premier League | ASFA Yennenga | 10th | 2009 |
| Burundi | 2009–10 Burundi Premier League | Vital'O FC | 17th | 2009 |
| Cameroon | 2009–10 Elite One | Cotonsport Garoua | 9th | 2007–08 |
| Cape Verde | 2010 Cape Verdean Football Championships | Boavista | 4th | 1994–95 |
| Central African Republic | 2010 Central African Republic League | Olympic Real de Bangui | 9th | 2004 |
| Chad | 2010 Première Division | Tourbillon FC | 5th | 2001 |
| Comoros | 2010 Comoros Premier League | Élan Club | 4th | 2003–04 |
| (Republic of the Congo) Congo | 2010 Congo Premier League | Saint Michel de Ouenzé | 2nd | 2003 |
| Djibouti | 2009–10 Djibouti Premier League | AS Port | 1st | — |
| (Democratic Republic of the Congo) DR Congo | 2010 Linafoot | AS Vita Club | 12th | 2003 |
| Egypt | 2009–10 Egyptian Premier League | Al Ahly | 35th | 2008–09 |
| Equatorial Guinea | 2010 Equatoguinean Premier League | Deportivo Mongomo | 3rd | 1997 |
| Eritrea | 2010 Eritrean Premier League | Red Sea FC | 8th | 2009 |
| Ethiopia | 2009–10 Ethiopian Premier League | Saint-George SA | 23rd | 2008–09 |
| Gabon | 2009–10 Gabon Championnat National D1 | Missile | 2nd | 2003 |
| (The Gambia) Gambia | 2010 GFA League First Division | Ports Authority | 5th | 2006 |
| Ghana | 2009–10 Ghana Premier League | Aduana Stars | 1st | — |
| Guinea | 2009–10 Guinée Championnat National | Fello Star | 4th | 2008–09 |
| Guinea-Bissau | 2009–10 Campeonato Nacional da Guiné-Bissau | Sport Bissau e Benfica | 9th | 1990–91 |
| Ivory Coast | 2010 Côte d'Ivoire Premier Division | ASEC Mimosas | 24th | 2009 |
| Kenya | 2010 Kenyan Premier League | Ulinzi Stars | 4th | 2005 |
| Lesotho | 2009–10 Lesotho Premier League | Matlama | 9th | 2003 |
| Liberia | 2010 LFA First Division | Competition not held | | |
| Libya | 2009–10 Libyan Premier League | Ittihad | 16th | 2008–09 |
| Madagascar | 2010 THB Champions League | CNaPS Sport | 1st | — |
| Malawi | 2010 Super League of Malawi | Silver Strikers | 5th | 2008 |
| Mali | 2009–10 Malian Première Division | Stade Malien | 16th | 2007 |
| Mauritania | 2010 Mauritanean Premier League | CF Cansado | 2nd | 2009 |
| Mauritius | 2010 Mauritian Premier League | Pamplemousses | 2nd | 2005–06 |
| Morocco | 2009–10 Botola | Wydad Casablanca | 17th | 2005–06 |
| Mozambique | 2010 Moçambola | Liga Muçulmana | 1st | — |
| Namibia | 2009–10 Namibia Premier League | African Stars | 3rd | 2008–09 |
| Niger | 2010 Niger Premier League | AS FAN | 3rd | 1975 |
| Nigeria | 2009–10 Nigeria Premier League | Enyimba | 6th | 2007 |
| Réunion | 2010 Réunion Premier League | Stade Tamponnaise | 10th | 2009 |
| Rwanda | 2009–10 Rwanda Premier Leagu | APR | 11th | 2009 |
| São Tomé and Príncipe | 2009–10 São Tomé and Príncipe Championship | GD Sundy | 1st | — |
| Senegal | 2010 Ligue 1 | ASC Diaraf | 11th | 2003–04 |
| Seychelles | 2010 Seychelles League | St Michel United | 9th | 2008 |
| Sierra Leone | 2009–10 Sierra Leone National Premier League | East End Lions | 3rd | 2008 |
| Somalia | 2009–10 Somali First Division | Banadir SC | 4th | 2008–09 |
| South Africa | 2009–10 Premier Soccer League | Supersport United | 3rd | 2008–09 |
| Sudan | 2010 Sudan Premier League | Al-Hilal | 22nd | 2009 |
| (Eswatini) Swaziland | 2009–10 Swazi Premier League | Young Buffaloes | 1st | — |
| Tanzania | 2009–10 Tanzanian Premier League | Simba | 17th | 2007 |
| Togo | 2010 Togolese Championnat National | Competition not held | | |
| Tunisia | 2009–10 Tunisian Ligue Professionnelle 1 | Espérance de Tunis | 23rd | 2008–09 |
| Uganda | 2009–10 Uganda Premier League | Vipers SC | 1st | — |
| Zambia | 2010 Zambian Premier League | ZESCO United | 3rd | 2008 |
| Zanzibar | 2010 Zanzibar Premier League | Zanzibar Ocean View | 1st | — |
| Zimbabwe | 2010 Zimbabwe Premier Soccer League | Motor Action | 1st | — |

=== CONCACAF ===
| Nation | League | Champions |
|---|---|---|
| Anguilla | Anguillan League | Roaring Lions |
| Antigua and Barbuda | Antigua and Barbuda Premier Division | Bassa |
| Aruba | Campeonato AVB | Britannia |
| (The Bahamas) Bahamas | BFA Senior League | IM Bears |
| (The Bahamas) Bahamas | New Providence Football League | Cavalier FC |
| (The Bahamas) Bahamas | Grand Bahama Football League | Playtime Tigers |
| Barbados | Barbados Premiere League | Notre Dame |
| Belize | Belize Premier Football League | Defense Force |
| Bermuda | Bermudian Premier Division | Dandy Town Hornets |
| British Virgin Islands | British Virgin Islands Championship | Islanders FC |
| Canada | Canadian Soccer League | Brantford Galaxy (P) |
| Canada | Canadian Soccer League | York Region Shooters (R) |
| Cayman Islands | Cayman Islands League | Scholars International |
| Costa Rica | Primera División de Costa Rica | Saprissa (C) / (A) |
| Costa Rica | Segunda División de Costa Rica | Barrio México (C) |
| Costa Rica | Segunda División de Costa Rica | Limón (A) |
| Cuba | Campeonato Nacional de Fútbol de Cuba | Ciego de Ávila |
| Curaçao | Curaçao League | Hubentut Fortuna |
| Dominica | Dominica Championship | Centre Bath Estate |
| El Salvador | Primera División de Fútbol Profesional | Isidro Metapán (C) / (A) |
| El Salvador | Segunda División de Fútbol Salvadoreño | UES (C) |
| El Salvador | Segunda División de Fútbol Salvadoreño | Once Municipal (A) |
| French Guiana | Championnat National | Le Geldar |
| Grenada | Grenada League | Carib Hurricane |
| Guadeloupe | Guadeloupe Division d'Honneur | Vieux-Habitants |
| Guatemala | Liga Nacional de Fútbol de Guatemala | Municipal (C) |
| Guatemala | Liga Nacional de Fútbol de Guatemala | Comunicaciones (A) |
| Guatemala | Primera División de Ascenso | Mictlán (C) |
| Guatemala | Primera División de Ascenso | Malacateco (A) |
| Guyana | Guyanese Super League | Alpha United |
| Haiti | Ligue Haïtienne | Tempête (O) |
| Haiti | Ligue Haïtienne | Victory SC (F) |
| Honduras | Honduran Liga Nacional | Olimpia (C) |
| Honduras | Honduran Liga Nacional | Real España (A) |
| Honduras | Honduran Liga Ascenso | Necaxa (C) |
| Honduras | Honduran Liga Ascenso | Atlético Independiente (A) |
| Jamaica | National Premier League | Harbour View |
| Jamaica | KSAFA Super League | Cavaliers |
| Jamaica | South Central Super League | Naggo Head |
| Jamaica | Eastern Confederation Super League | Benfica |
| Jamaica | Western Confederation Super League | Reno |
| Martinique | Martinique Championnat National | RC Rivière-Pilote |
| Mexico | Primera División de México | Toluca (C) |
| Mexico | Primera División de México | Santos Laguna (A) |
| Mexico | Liga de Ascenso | Necaxa (B) |
| Mexico | Liga de Ascenso | Tijuana (A) |
| Mexico | Segunda Division | Universidad (B) |
| Mexico | Segunda Division | Celaya (A) |
| Montserrat | competition cancelled | |
| Nevis | Nevis Premier Division | Stoney Grove Strikers |
| Panama | Liga Panameña de Fútbol | Árabe Unido (C) |
| Panama | Liga Panameña de Fútbol | Tauro (A) |
| Puerto Rico | Puerto Rico Soccer League | River Plate Puerto Rico |
| Puerto Rico | Liga Nacional | Maunabo Leones |
| (Saint Kitts and Nevis) St. Kitts and Nevis | SKNFA Premier League | Newtown United |
| Suriname | Hoofdklasse | Inter Moengotapoe |
| Suriname | Eerste Klasse | Kamal Dewaker |
| Suriname | Randdistrictentoernooi | Boma Star |
| Trinidad and Tobago | TT Pro League | Defence Force |
| Trinidad and Tobago | National Super League | T&TEC |
| United States | Major League Soccer | Colorado Rapids (P) |
| United States | Major League Soccer | Los Angeles Galaxy (R) |
| United States | USSF D2 Pro League | Puerto Rico Islanders (P) |
| United States | USSF D2 Pro League | Rochester Rhinos (R) |
| United States | USL Second Division | Charleston Battery |
| U.S. Virgin Islands | USVI Championship | New Vibes |

Note: "(A)" means Apertura champion; (B) means Bicentenario champion; "(C)" means Clausura champion.
Note: "(P)" designates the league champion, by winning the playoffs; "(R)" designates the regular season champion.

- Saint Kitts: Newtown United
- Saint Lucia: Roots Alley Ballers
- Saint-Martin: Orleans Attackers
- Saint Vincent and the Grenadines: Avenues United
- Sint Maarten: D & P Connection
- Turks and Caicos Islands: AFC Academy

=== CONMEBOL ===
| Nation | League | Champion | Title | Last Honor |
|---|---|---|---|---|
| Argentina | 2010 Torneo Clausura | Argentinos Juniors | 3rd | 1985 |
| Argentina | 2010 Torneo Apertura | Estudiantes | 6th | 2007 Apertura |
| Bolivia | 2010 Campeonato Apertura | Jorge Wilstermann | 12th | 2006 Segundo Torneo |
| Bolivia | 2010 Campeonato Clausura | Oriente Petrolero | 5th | 2001 |
| Brazil | 2010 Campeonato Brasileiro Série A | Fluminense | 3rd | 1984 |
| Chile | 2010 Primera Division | Universidad Católica | 10th | 2005 Clausura |
| Colombia | 2010 Torneo Apertura | Junior | 6th | 2004 Finalización |
| Colombia | 2010 Torneo Finalización | Once Caldas | 4th | 2009 Apertura |
| Ecuador | 2010 Campeonato Ecuatoriano de Fútbol Serie A | LDU Quito | 10th | 2007 |
| Paraguay | 2010 Torneo Apertura | Guaraní | 10th | 1984 |
| Paraguay | 2010 Torneo Clausura | Libertad | 15th | 2008 Clausura |
| Peru | 2010 Torneo Descentralizado | Universidad San Martín | 3rd | 2008 |
| Uruguay | 2009–10 Uruguayan Primera División | Peñarol | 46th | 2003 |
| Venezuela | 2009–10 Venezuelan Primera División | Caracas | 11th | 2008–09 |

=== OFC ===
| Nation | League | Champion | Title | Last honor |
|---|---|---|---|---|
| Cook Islands | 2010 Cook Islands Round Cup | Tupapa Maraerenga | 8th | 2007 |
| Fiji | 2010 Fiji National Football League | Ba | 17th | 2008 |
| New Caledonia | 2012 New Caledonia Division Honneur | AS Mont-Dore | 3rd | 2006 |
| New Zealand | 2009–10 New Zealand Football Championship | Auckland City FC | 3rd | 2005–06 |
| Papua New Guinea | 2009–10 Papua New Guinea National Soccer League | Hekari United | 4th | 2008–09 |
| American Samoa | 2010 FFAS Senior League | Pago Youth FC | 2nd | 2008 |
| Solomon Islands | 2009–10 Solomon Islands National Club Championship | Koloale F.C. | 3rd | 2007–08 |
| (French Polynesia) Tahiti | 2009–10 Tahiti First Division | AS Tefana | 2nd | 2005 |
| Tonga | 2010 Tonga Major League | Competition not held | | |
| Vanuatu | 2009–10 Port Vila Premier League | Amicale FC | 1st | — |

=== UEFA ===
- Albania: Dinamo Tirana
- Andorra: FC Santa Coloma
- Armenia: Pyunik Yerevan
- Austria: Red Bull Salzburg
- Azerbaijan: Inter Baku
- Belarus: FC BATE Borisov
- Belgium: Anderlecht
- Bosnia and Herzegovina: FK Željezničar Sarajevo
- Bulgaria: Litex Lovech
- Croatia: Dinamo Zagreb
- Cyprus: Omonia
- Czech Republic: Sparta Prague
- Denmark: Copenhagen
- England: Chelsea
- Estonia: FC Flora Tallinn
- Faroe Islands: HB Thorshavn
- Finland: HJK Helsinki
- France: Marseille
- (Georgia (country)) Georgia: Olimpi Rustavi
- Germany: Bayern Munich
- Greece: Panathinaikos
- Hungary: Debreceni VSC
- Iceland: Breiðablik UBK
- Republic of Ireland: Shamrock Rovers
- Israel: Hapoel Tel Aviv
- Italy: Internazionale
- Kazakhstan: Tobol Kostanay
- Latvia: Skonto Riga
- Lithuania: Ekranas Panevezys
- Luxembourg: Jeunesse Esch
- (North Macedonia) Macedonia: Renova
- Malta: Birkirkara
- Moldova: Sheriff Tiraspol
- Montenegro: Rudar Pljevlja
- Netherlands: Twente
- Northern Ireland: Linfield
- Norway: Rosenborg Trondheim
- Poland: Lech Poznań
- Portugal: Benfica
- Romania: Cluj
- Russia: FC Zenit Saint Petersburg
- San Marino: Tre Fiori
- Scotland: Rangers
- Serbia: Partizan
- Slovakia: MŠK Žilina
- Slovenia: Koper
- Spain: Barcelona
- Sweden: Malmö FF
- Switzerland: Basel
- Turkey: Bursaspor
- Ukraine: Shakhtar Donetsk
- Wales: The New Saints

== Domestic cup winners ==
=== AFC ===
- Japan

Emperor's Cup: Kashima Antlers

- Qatar

Emir of Qatar Cup: Al-Rayyan

- Singapore

Singapore Cup: (Thailand) Bangkok Glass

- Thailand

Thai FA Cup: Chonburi FC

=== CAF ===
- South Africa

Nedbank Cup: Bidvest Wits

=== CONCACAF ===
- Canada

Canadian Championship: Toronto FC

- Suriname

Beker van Suriname: Excelsior

- United States

U.S. Open Cup: Seattle Sounders FC

=== CONMEBOL ===
- Brazil

Copa do Brasil: Santos

=== OFC ===
- New Zealand

Chatham Cup: Miramar Rangers

=== UEFA ===
- England

FA Cup: Chelsea
League Cup: Manchester United

- France

Coupe de France: Paris Saint-Germain
Coupe de la Ligue: Marseille

- Germany

DFB-Pokal: Bayern Munich

- Greece

Greek Cup: Panathinaikos

- Italy

Coppa Italia: Internazionale

- Netherlands

KNVB Cup: Ajax

- Portugal

Taça de Portugal: Porto
Taça da Liga: Benfica

- Russia

Russian Cup: Zenit St. Petersburg

- Scotland

Scottish Cup: Dundee United
Scottish League Cup: Rangers

- Slovenia

Slovenian Cup: Maribor

- Spain

Copa del Rey: Sevilla

- Turkey

Turkish Cup: Trabzonspor

== Deaths ==
=== January ===
- 1 January – Sergio Messen, Chilean midfielder (60)
- 1 January – Jean-Pierre Posca, French defender (57)
- 3 January - Gus Alexander, Scottish footballer (75)
- 7 January – Alex Parker, Scottish defender (74)
- 9 January - Améleté Abalo, Togolese football manager (47)
- 11 January - Johnny King, English footballer (83)
- 13 January - Tommy Sloan, Scottish footballer (84)
- 15 January – Detlev Lauscher, German striker (57)
- 18 January – Lino Grava, Italian defender (82)
- 19 January – Nils Jensen, Danish goalkeeper (74)
- 19 January – Panajot Pano, Albanian striker (70)
- 19 January - Christos Hatziskoulidis, Greek footballer (57)
- 20 January - Jack Parry, Welsh footballer (86)
- 21 January – Marino Bergamasco, Italian midfielder (84)
- 26 January – Lars Larsson, Swedish defender (76)

=== February ===
- 1 February - Bobby Kirk, Scottish footballer (82)
- 3 February – Gil Merrick, English goalkeeper (88)
- 5 February – Galimzyan Khusainov, Russian striker (72)
- 7 February - Bobby Dougan, Scottish footballer (83)
- 8 February – Angelo Franzosi, Italian goalkeeper (88)
- 9 February – Constant de Backer, Belgian midfielder (81)
- 10 February – Orlando, Brazilian defender (74)
- 11 February – Brian Godfrey, Welsh striker (69)
- 11 February – Yury Sevidov, Russian striker (67)
- 12 February – Werner Krämer, German striker (70)
- 12 February – Petar Borota, Serbian goalkeeper (57)
- 12 February – Luis Molowny, Spanish midfielder and manager (84)
- 13 February – Marian Parse, Romanian striker (23, cancer)
- 14 February – Zhang Yalin, Chinese midfielder (28, lymphoma)
- February 15 – Juan Carlos González, Uruguayan defender, winner of the 1950 FIFA World Cup. (85)
- 16 February – Wan Chi Keung, Hong Kong striker (53)
- 18 February - Alan Gordon, Scottish footballer (65)
- 20 February - Bobby Cox, Scottish footballer (76)
- 22 February - Bobby Smith, Scottish footballer (56)
- 23 February – Gerhard Neef, German goalkeeper (63)
- 27 February - Charlie Crowe, English footballer (85)
- 28 February - Adam Blacklaw, Scottish footballer (72)

=== March ===
- 3 March - Keith Alexander, English footballer (53)
- 4 March - Tony Richards, English footballer (75)
- 6 March - Mansour Amirasefi, Iranian footballer (76)
- 6 March - Endurance Idahor, Nigerian footballer (25)
- 9 March - Gheorghe Constantin, Romanian footballer (77)
- 11 March - Wille MacFarlane, Scottish footballer (79)
- 12 March - Aleksandr Minayev, Russian footballer (51)
- 12 March - Hugh Robertson, Scottish footballer (70)
- 13 March - Édouard Kargu, French footballer (84)
- 13 March - Charlie Ashcroft, English footballer (83)
- 17 March - Abdellah Blinda, Moroccan footballer (58)
- 18 March - Júlio Correia da Silva, Portuguese footballer (90)
- 19 March - Bob Curtis, English footballer (60)
- 20 March - Naim Kryeziu, Albanian footballer (92)
- 27 March - Zbigniew Gut, Polish footballer (60)
- 28 March - Derlis Florentín, Paraguayan footballer (26)

=== April ===
- 3 April - Oleg Kopayev, Russian footballer (72)
- 6 April - Sid Storey, English footballer (90)
- 9 April - Zoltán Varga, Hungarian footballer (65)
- 10 April - Manfred Reichert, German footballer (69)
- 11 April - Hans-Joachim Göring, German footballer (86)
- 11 April - Theodor Homann, German footballer (61)
- 12 April - Alper Balaban, Turkish footballer (22)
- 13 April - Jorge Bontemps, Argentine footballer (32)
- 13 April - Charlie Timmins, English footballer (87)
- 15 April - Wilhelm Huxhorn, German footballer (54)
- 17 April - Alexandru Neagu, Romanian footballer (61)
- 21 April - Sammy Baird, Scottish footballer (79)
- 21 April - Tony Ingham, English footballer (85)
- 21 April - Manfred Kallenbach, German footballer (68)
- 22 April - Emilio Álvarez, Uruguayan footballer (71)
- 22 April - Victor Nurenberg, Luxembourgian footballer (79)
- 22 April - Piet Steenbergen, Dutch footballer (81)
- 25 April - Ian Lawther, Northern Irish footballer (70)
- 26 April – Alberto Vitoria, Spanish midfielder (54)
- 26 April - Yuri Vshivtsev, Russian footballer (70)

=== May ===
- May - Bert Padden, Scottish football referee (born 1932)
- 3 May - Denis Obua, Ugandan footballer (62)
- 6 May - Guillermo Meza, Mexican footballer (21)
- 6 May - Giacomo Neri, Italian footballer (94)
- 7 May – Denovan Morales, Honduran midfielder (22)
- 11 May
  - Brian Gibson, English footballer (82)
  - Emmanuel Ngobese, South African footballer (29; tuberculosis)
- 13 May - Walter Klimmek, German football defender (91)
- 15 May - Besian Idrizaj, Austrian footballer (22)
- 19 May - Harry Vos, Dutch footballer (63)
- 24 May - Kambozia Jamali, Iranian midfielder (71)
- 26 May - Leo Canjels, Dutch footballer (77)

=== June ===
- 1 June - John Hagart, Scottish footballer (72)
- 4 June - Hennadiy Popovych, Ukrainian footballer (37)
- 6 June - Mabi de Almeida, Angolan football manager (46)
- 7 June - Jorge Ginarte, Argentine footballer (70)
- 9 June - Mohamed Sylla, Guinean footballer (39)
- 12 June – Mao Mengsuo, Chinese midfielder (20)
- 20 June – Lai Sun Cheung, Hong Kong defender (59)
- 20 June - Roberto Rosato, Italian footballer (66)
- 22 June - Amokrane Oualiken, Algerian footballer (77)
- 23 June - Jörg Berger, German footballer (65)
- 27 June - Édgar García de Dios, Mexican footballer (32)

=== July ===
- July 1 - Eddie Moussa, Swedish footballer (26)
- July 3 - Colin Gardner, British football manager
- July 3 – Herbert Erhardt, West-German defender, winner of the 1954 FIFA World Cup, listed by the DFB in the top 20 best German defenders of all time. (79)
- July 6 - Alekos Sofianidis, Greek footballer (76)
- July 8 - Guillermo León, Costa Rican footballer
- July 11 - Rudi Strittich, Austrian footballer (88)
- July 13 - Ken Barnes, British footballer (81)
- July 17 - Shaun Mawer, English footballer (50)
- July 17 - Ioannis Stefas, Greek footballer (61)
- July 17 - Gunārs Ulmanis, Latvian footballer (71)
- July 19 - Joseph Aghoghovbia, Nigerian footballer (69)
- July 19 - Daiki Sato, Japanese footballer (21)
- July 28 - Daniel Pettit, English footballer (95)
- July 29 - Alex Wilson, Polish footballer (76)
- July 30 - Stanley Milburn, English footballer (83)
- July 31 - Pedro Dellacha, Argentine footballer (84)

=== August ===
- August 2 - José María Silvero, Argentine footballer (78)
- August 3 - Edmund Zientara, Polish footballer (81)
- August 5 - Yuri Shishlov, Russian footballer (65)
- August 8 - Ken Boyes, English footballer (75)
- August 8 - Massamasso Tchangai, Togolese footballer (32)
- August 10 - Brian Clark, English footballer (67)
- August 10 - Adam Stansfield, English footballer (31)
- August 13 - Panagiotis Bachramis, Greek footballer (34)
- August 22 - Raúl Belén, Argentine footballer (79)
- August 22 – Juan Carlos González, Uruguayan defender, winner of the 1950 FIFA World Cup. (85)
- August 22 - Stjepan Bobek, Yugoslav footballer (86)
- August 27 - Oscar Ntwagae, South African footballer (33)
- August 28 - Isa Bakar, Malaysian footballer (57)
- August 30 - Francisco Varallo, Argentine striker and the last surviving player of the 1930 FIFA World Cup and the final. (100)
- August 30 - Henryk Czapczyk, Polish footballer (88)
- August 30 - Philip Tisson, Saint Lucian footballer (24)

=== September ===
- 2 September - Jackie Sinclair, Scottish midfielder (67, cancer)
- 3 September - Jose Augusto Torres, Portuguese striker and manager (71, heart failure)
- 10 September - Andrei Timoshenko, Russian striker (41)
- 10 September - Fridrikh Maryutin, Soviet striker (85)
- 11 September - Diego Rodríguez Cano, Uruguayan defender (22, car accident)
- 18 September - Bobby Smith, English striker (77, after a short illness)
- 18 September - Øystein Gåre, Norwegian manager (56, after a short illness)
- 22 September - Vyacheslav Tsaryov, Russian defender (39, after a short illness)
- 23 September - Fernando Riera, Chilean striker and manager (90)
- 28 September - Orvin Cabrera, Honduran striker (33, liver cancer)

=== October ===
- 1 October - Ian Buxton, English striker (72)
- 1 October - Bobby Craig, Scottish footballer (75)
- 1 October - Dezső Bundzsák, Hungarian midfielder and manager (82)
- 6 October - Norman Christie, Scottish footballer (85)
- 9 October - Les Fell, English midfielder (89)
- 12 October - José Casas 'Pepín', Spanish goalkeeper (78)
- 13 October - Juan Carlos Arteche, Spanish midfielder (53, cancer)
- 13 October - Eddie Baily, English striker (85)
- 14 October - Malcolm Allison, English defender and manager (83, after a long illness)
- 18 October - Mel Hopkins, Welsh defender (75)
- 18 October - Hans Hägele, German striker and football agent (70, suicide)
- 21 October - Mustapha Anane, Algerian striker (60, after a long illness)
- 22 October - Franz Raschid, German midfielder (56, pancreatic cancer)
- 24 October - Fritz Grösche, German midfielder and manager (69, cancer)
- 26 October - Paul the Octopus, 2010 FIFA World Cup "oracle" (2, natural causes)
- 29 October - Ronnie Clayton, English midfielder (76)
- 30 October - John Benson, Scottish defender and manager (67, after a short illness)

=== November ===
- 3 November - Ron Cockerill, English defender (75)
- 8 November - Fred Blankemeijer, Dutch defender (84)
- 8 November - Tim Womack, English footballer (76)
- 12 November - Jim Farry, Former Chief Executive of the Scottish FA (56, heart attack)
- 15 November -Ángel Cabrera, Uruguayan footballer (71)
- 16 November - Ilie Savu, Romanian goalkeeper and manager (90)
- November 17 - Olavo Rodrigues Barbosa, Brazilian defender, runner-up at the 1950 FIFA World Cup. (87)
- 18 November - Jim Cruickshank, Scottish goalkeeper (69)
- 24 November - Valentin Ivakin, Soviet goalkeeper and manager (80)
- 26 November - Mohammad Anwar Elahee, Mauritian defender and manager (81)
- 27 November - Steve Hill, English footballer (70)
- 28 November - Vladimir Maslachenko, Soviet European Nation's Cup winning goalkeeper (74)

=== December ===
- 3 December - Jose Ramos Delgado, Argentine defender (75, Alzheimer disease)
- 5 December - Shamil Burziyev, Russian defender (25, car accident)
- 6 December - Imre Mathesz, Hungarian midfielder (73)
- 6 December - Rene Hauss, French defender and manager (82)
- 7 December - Federico Vairo, Argentine defender (80, stomach cancer)
- 10 December - Marcel Domingo, French goalkeeper and manager (86)
- 11 December - Peter Risi, Swiss striker (60, after a long illness)
- 12 December - Emmanuel Ogoli, Nigerian defender (21, collapsed on the pitch)
- 14 December - Dale Roberts, English goalkeeper (24, suicide)
- 17 December - Ralph Coates, English midfielder (64, stroke)
- 21 December - Oleksandr Kovalenko, Ukrainian midfielder and referee (34, suicide)
- 21 December - Enzo Bearzot, Italian defender and World Cup winning manager (83)
- 24 December - Frans de Munck, Dutch goalkeeper (88)
- 26 December - Bill Jones, English defender (89)
- 27 December - Walter Balmer, Swiss international footballer (born 1948)
- 28 December - Jeff Taylor, English footballer (80)
- 29 December - Ramón Montesinos, Spanish midfielder (67)
- 29 December - Avi Cohen, Israeli defender (54, motorcycle accident)
