= Kallenbach =

Kallenbach is a German surname. Notable people with the surname include:

- Gisela Kallenbach (born 1944), German MEP
- Hermann Kallenbach (1871–1945), South African architect and close friend of Gandhi
- Józef Kallenbach (1861–1929), Polish literature historian
- Kenneth Keith Kallenbach, American comedian
- Manfred Kallenbach (1942–2010), German goalkeeper
