= Norman Christie =

Norman Christie may refer to:

- Norman Christie (footballer, born 1909), English footballer
- Norman Christie (footballer, born 1925), Scottish footballer
