= Ken Boyes =

Ken Boyes may refer to:

- Ken Boyes (footballer, born 1895) (1895–1963), English professional footballer
- Ken Boyes (footballer, born 1935) (1935–2010), English professional footballer
