= Paulke =

Paulke is a German surname. It is a patronymic surname originaled from the diminutive for the given name Paul. Notable people with the surname include:

- Ines Paulke, German singer
- Wilhelm Paulke (1903–1995), German German painter and teacher
