= List of football clubs in American Samoa =

This is a list of football (soccer) clubs in American Samoa.^{1}

- Atu'u Broncos
- Atu'u Broncos B
- Aua Old School
- Autali Misasa Katolik
- Black Roses
- FC SKBC
- Fagasa Youth
- Fagatogo Blue
- Flame On
- Green Bay
- Ilaoa & Toomata
- Kiwi Soccers
- Konica
- Konica Airbase
- Lauli'i
- Lion Heart
- Lion Heart B
- Manuula Heat
- Pacific Products
- Pago Eagles
- Pago Youth
- Pago Youth B
- PanSa East
- Peace Brothers
- Renegades
- Royal Puma FC
- Tafuna Jets
- Tafuna Jets B
- Tafuna Jets C
- Taputimu Youth
- Utulei Youth
- Vaiala Tongan
- Vaiala Tongan B
- Vailoatai Youth
- Vaitogi United

Aua Old School
- Division: Not specified
- Location: Aua
Notes

- Note 1: This list involves all teams that played in the FFAS Senior League from 2006 to 2015.
