= Langsam =

Langsam may refer to:

- Langsam, a German tempo marking for slow music
- Alex Langsam (born 1938), British businessman
- Marcel Langsam (1891–1979), Luxembourgish gymnast
- Walter C. Langsam (1916–1985), American academic
- Langsam (train), the name of a passenger train in Indonesia

== See also ==
- Freck Langsam, a 2010 German film
