= 2011 FFAS Senior League =

FFAS Senior League
- Season: 2011
- Champions: Pago Youth A
- Matches: 76
- Goals: 410 (5.39 per match)

The 2011 season of the FFAS Senior League was the thirty-first season of association football competition in American Samoa. Pago Youth A won the championship, their third recorded title and second in a row, with the winners of the 2006 league competition and a number of previous seasons unknown.

All games were played at the Kananafou Theological Seminary College Sports Field due to the FFAS soccer field in Pago Pago undergoing improvements due to the damage after the 2009 Samoa earthquake and tsunami.

== Format ==
Eighteen teams competed in the league divided into two groups of nine. The top two teams in each group qualified automatically for the semi-final stage. The group stage was played on a round robin basis and all knockout rounds were one-legged.

== Pool A ==
=== Table ===
Pos	Team	Pld	W	D	L	GF	GA	GD	Pts	Qualification
1	Pago Youth A (Q)	8	8	0	0	56	2	+54	24	Qualification for Semi finals
2	Vaitogi United (Q)	8	6	0	2	42	16	+26	18	Qualification for Semi finals
3	Fagasa Youth	8	6	0	2	33	12	+21	18	
4	Kiwi Soccers	8	6	0	2	28	11	+17	18	
5	Vaiala Tongan	8	3	1	4	10	36	−26	10	
6	Fagatogo Blue	8	3	0	5	31	19	+12	9	
7	Lion Heart B	8	1	2	5	8	27	−19	5	
8	Ilaoa and Toomata	8	1	1	6	15	25	−10	4	
9	Atu'u Broncos B	8	0	0	8	0	75	−75	0	

Updated to match(es) played on 10 December 2011. Source:
Rules for classification: 1) points; 2) goal difference; 3) number of goals scored.
(Q) Qualified for the phase indicated

== Pool B ==
=== Table ===
Pos	Team	Pld	W	D	L	GF	GA	GD	Pts	Qualification
1	Vailoatai Youth (Q)	8	8	0	0	33	8	+25	24	Qualification for Semi finals
2	Pago Youth B (Q)	8	4	3	1	18	8	+10	15	Qualification for Semi finals
3	Black Roses	8	4	2	2	25	10	+15	14	
4	Utulei Youth	8	3	3	2	22	16	+6	12	
5	Lion Heart A	8	3	3	2	9	8	+1	12	
6	Tafuna Jets	8	2	4	2	22	21	+1	10	
7	PanSa	8	2	1	5	20	28	−8	7	
8	Atu'u Broncos A	8	1	1	6	11	39	−28	4	
9	Green Bay	8	0	1	7	9	31	−22	1	

Updated to match(es) played on 10 December 2011. Source:
Rules for classification: 1) points; 2) goal difference; 3) number of goals scored.
(Q) Qualified for the phase indicated

== Knockout stage ==
=== Semi finals ===
10 December 2011

Pago Youth A	5–1	Pago Youth B
Unknown	Source	Unknown

Kananafou Theological Seminary College Sports Field
10 December 2011

Vailoatai Youth	3–0	Vaitogi United
Unknown	Source	Unknown

Kananafou Theological Seminary College Sports Field

=== Third place match ===
17 December 2011

Pago Youth B	3–2	Vaitogi United
Unknown	Source	Unknown

Kananafou Theological Seminary College Sports Field

=== Final ===
17 December 2011

Pago Youth A	3–1	Vailoatai Youth
Unknown	Source	Unknown

Kananafou Theological Seminary College Sports Field
