= 2012 FFAS Senior League =

FFAS Senior League
- Season: 2012
- Champions: Pago Youth A
- Matches: 56
- Goals: 246 (4.39 per match)
- Biggest home win: Utulei Youth 16 – 0 Kiwi Soccers (22 September 2012)
- Biggest away win: Pago Youth B 0 – 9 Utulei Youth (3 November 2012)
- Highest scoring: Utulei Youth 16 – 0 Kiwi Soccers (22 September 2012)

The 2012 season of the FFAS Senior League was the thirty-second season of association football competition in American Samoa. Pago Youth A won the championship, their fourth recorded title and third in a row.

== Format ==
Eight teams competed in the league. The top team became the champion and the bottom two teams must play a play-off match from the Division 2.

== Table ==
Pos	Team	Pld	W	D	L	GF	GA	GD	Pts	Qualification
1	Pago Youth A (C)	14	12	2	0	43	9	+34	38	Qualified for 2013–14 OFC Champions League
2	Black Roses	14	10	1	3	28	13	+15	31	
3	Utulei Youth	14	9	0	5	55	19	+36	27	
4	Lion Heart A	14	5	3	6	27	34	−7	18	
5	Tafuna Jets	14	5	2	7	22	29	−7	17	
6	Vaitogi United	14	5	0	9	37	35	+2	15	
7	Pago Youth B	14	3	1	10	23	49	−26	10	Qualification for relegation play-offs
8	Kiwi Soccers	14	1	1	12	11	60	−49	4	Qualification for relegation play-offs

Updated to match(es) played on 4 April 2013. Source:
Rules for classification: 1) points; 2) goal difference; 3) number of goals scored.
(C) Champions
