= Friedrichsthal =

- Town
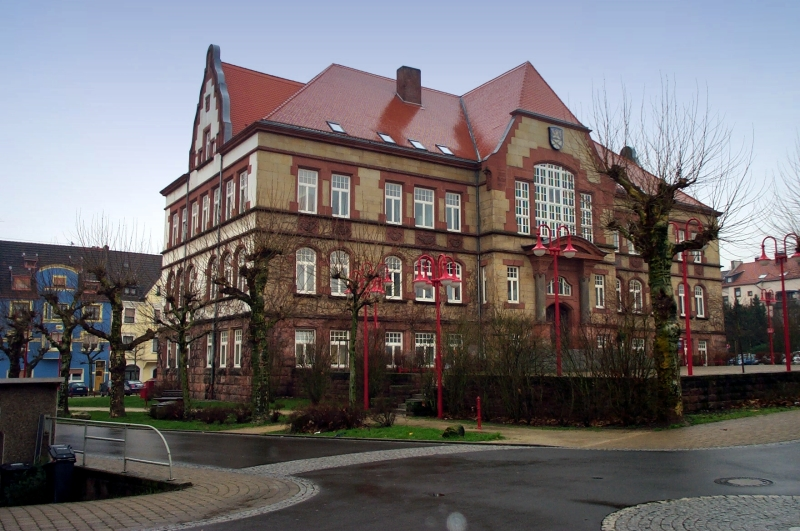
- Town hall

- Flag Coat of arms

- Location of Friedrichsthal within Saarbrücken district
- Interactive map of Friedrichsthal
- Location within Germany Location within Saarland
- Coordinates: 49°19′32″N 7°5′46″E
- Country: Germany
- State: Saarland
- District: Saarbrücken
- Subdivisions: 3

Government
  - Mayor (2020–30): Christian Jung (SPD)

Area
  - Total: 9.07 km^{2} (3.50 sq mi)
- Elevation: 300 m (980 ft)

Population (2025-12-31)
  - Total: 10,090
  - Density: 1,110/km^{2} (2,880/sq mi)
- Time zone: UTC+01:00 (CET)
  - Summer (DST): UTC+02:00 (CEST)
- Postal codes: 66293–66299
- Dialling codes: 06897
- Vehicle registration: SB
- Website: www.friedrichsthal.de

Friedrichsthal (German pronunciation: [ˈfʁiːdʁɪçsˌtaːl]) is a town and a municipality in the district of Saarbrücken, of Saarland, Germany. It is situated approximately 13 km northeast of Saarbrücken.

Friedrichsthal (Saar) station is located on the Bingen (Rhein)–Saarbrücken railway.

== History ==
In 1723 the place was founded with a glass foundry by Frederick Louis, Count of Nassau-Ottweiler.

== Sons and daughters of the city ==
- Johannes Driessler (1921-1998), composer
- Joseph Rank (1816–1896), German-Austrian writer
- Manfred Römbell (1941-2010), writer
