= Joseph Rank (writer) =

German-Austrian writer

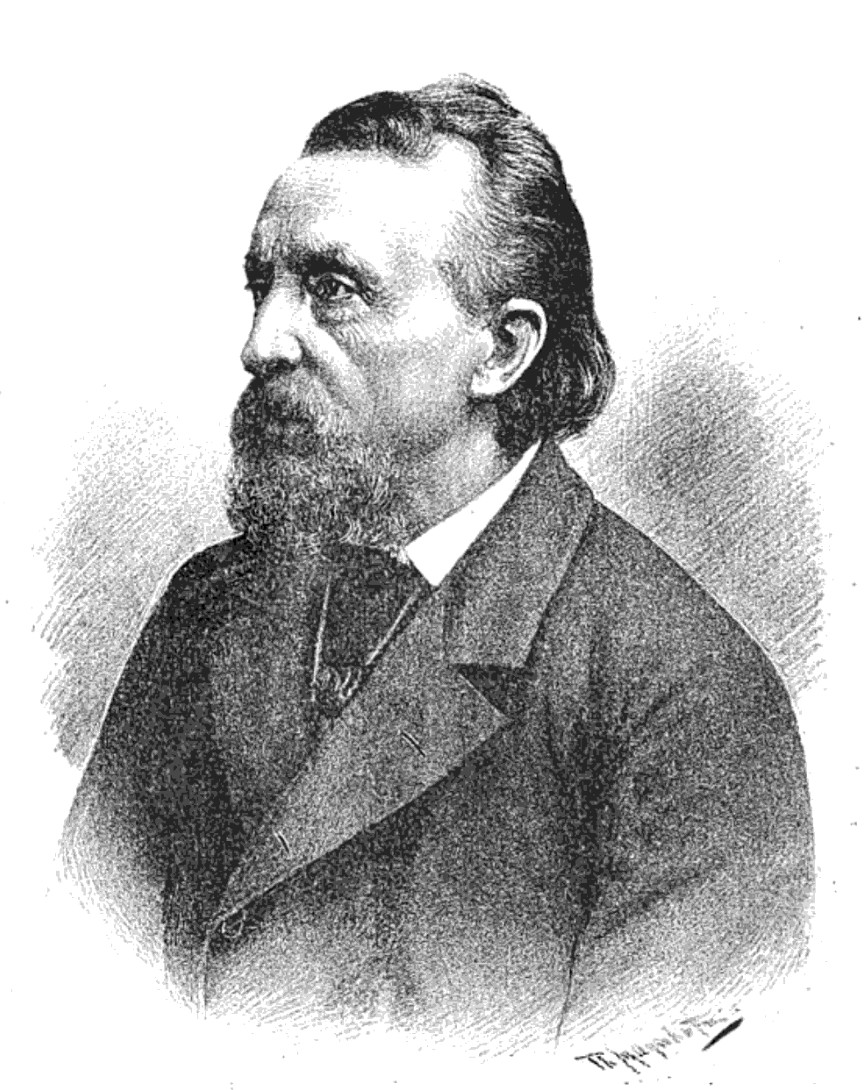
Portrait of Joseph Rank

Josef Rank (Friedrichsthal, 10 June 1816 – Vienna, 27 March 1896) was a German-Austrian writer.

== Biography ==
Rank was the son of a farmer; his father originally intended him to join the clergy. He studied philosophy and law in Vienna before beginning his literary career in the Oesterreichisches Morgenblatt, an Austrian newspaper.

In 1848, he was elected to the Frankfurt National Assembly, where he was a moderate member of the liberal party. Rank moved between cities frequently, living in Stuttgart; Frankfurt; Weimar, where he founded and briefly led the journal Weimarer Sonntags-Blatt in 1855; and Nürnberg, where he served as the editor of Nürnberger Kurir. In 1861 he moved to Vienna and became the permanent administrative secretary of the Vienna Court Opera, then later the Vienna city theater.

Throughout his writing, Rank recorded the culture and traditions of his Bohemian home, as well as wrote his own tales of "Böhmerwäldler" (inhabitants of the Bohemian Forest).

== His works ==
- Aus dem Böhmerwalde (1843);
- Neue Geschichten aus dem Böhmerwalde (1847);
- Eine Mutter vom Lande (1848);
- Florian (1853, 2 kötet);
- Geschichten armer Leute (1853);
- Von Haus zu Haus (1855);
- Achtspännig (1856, 2 kötet);
- Aus Dorf und Stadt (1860, 2 kötet);
- Ein Dorfbrutus (1861, 2 kötet);
- Im Klosterhof (1875);
- Der Seelenfänger (1876);
- Der Hauskobold (1886)
- Erinnerungen aus meinem Leben (Prague, 1896).
