= Philip Tisson =

Saint Lucian footballer

Personal information
- Full name: Isidore Philip Tisson
- Date of birth: 12 September 1985
- Place of birth: Saint Lucia
- Date of death: 30 August 2010 (aged 24)
- Place of death: New York, USA
- Position: Midfielder

Senior career*
Years	Team	Apps	(Gls)
2007–2008	Canaries		
2008–2009	Anse La Raye Young Stars		
2009–2010	Helenites		

International career
2008	Saint Lucia	2	(0)
- * Club domestic league appearances and goals

Isidore Philip Tisson (12 September 1985 – 30 August 2010) was an international footballer from Saint Lucia. Tisson played as a midfielder, and played club football for clubs throughout the Caribbean including Canaries, Anse La Raye Young Stars and Helenites.

Tisson was shot to death on 30 August 2010 in Brooklyn, New York City.
