= Eva Ostwalt =

Eva D. Ostwalt (or Oswalt; April 2, 1902 – May 23, 2010) was a German Jewish Holocaust survivor.

Ostwalt was born into a Jewish mercantile family in Cologne, the eldest of three daughters. During the Second World War, she was forced to work for Siemens in a camp next to the Ravensbrück concentration camp. She lost her mother in Auschwitz and her daughter during the bombing of Dresden. She barely survived. In 1947, she married her second husband Heinz Ostwalt and they soon emigrated to the United States.

Her daily life was shown in a TV documentary titled Lust am Leben - mit 103 in Amerika by Michael Marton, which aired in Germany on WDR. She lived on the outskirts of Washington, D.C. At the age of 105, Ostwalt was still able to drive and use a computer. During the documentary, it became apparent that the Holocaust was frequently on her mind. Even over 60 years after the event, Ostwalt did not want her neighbours to know of her Jewish background. Marton is preparing a longer version in English, to be entitled "To Live - what else!.
