= Wolfgang Graßl =

German skier and coach (1970–2010)

Wolfgang Graßl (January 11, 1970 – April 12, 2010 in Berchtesgaden) was a German skier, coach and businessman, who represented Germany on the junior level in the 1980s. He died of heart failure.
