= Erwin Bachmann =

German SS officer

- Born: 5 April 1921; Göttingen, German Empire
- Died: 18 February 2010 (aged 88); Göttingen, Germany
- Military career
- Allegiance: Nazi Germany
- Branch: Schutzstaffel (SS)
- Service years: 1939-1945
- Rank: Obersturmführer
- Unit: 10th SS Panzer Division Frundsberg
- Conflicts: World War II: Operation Northwind
- Awards: Knight's Cross

Erwin Bachmann (5 May 1921 – 18 February 2010) was an Obersturmführer (Senior Storm Leader/First Lieutenant) in the Waffen SS during World War II. He was a recipient of the Knight's Cross of the Iron Cross, awarded by Nazi Germany to recognize battlefield bravery or successful military leadership during World War II.

== Early life ==
Bachmann was born on the 5 May 1921 in Reinhausen, Göttingen. He was educated at home until 1927 when he attended the local school in Reinhausen. After leaving school in April 1935, he started an apprenticeship with a local firm, passing his trade tests in 1938 he was given a position as an administrative assistant.

== World War II ==
In August 1939 he volunteered for the SS-VT and was assigned to the 2nd Company, SS Training and Reserve Battalion Germania stationed in Hamburg.

At the end of the Polish Campaign he was posted as a machine gunner to the 11th Company SS Regiment Germania and took part in the Battle of France. He was promoted to Rottenführer (Corporal) in August 1941 and in September 1941 he was involved in Operation Barbarossa, the invasion of the Soviet Union until November 1941 when he returned to the SS Training and Reserve Battalion Germania.

He was then selected to become an officer and from February to June 1942 he was posted to the SS-Junkerschule (Officer Candidate School) in Bad Tölz and after graduation his first duties were in the SS Training and Reserve Battalion Germania which at the time was stationed in Arnhem in the Netherlands and he was promoted to Oberscharführer (Senior Squad Leader) in May 1942.

In September 1942 he volunteered for a posting with the SS Division Wiking until January 1943 and the formation of the new SS Division Frundsberg he was posted in as the adjutant of the 2nd Battalion, 10th SS Panzer Regiment, with the rank of Untersturmführer (Second Lieutenant).

In October 1943, he was given his first command, which was a platoon in the 3rd Company, 10th SS Panzer Frundsberg Division. After a short retraining course on the Sturmgeschütz (assault gun) he was given command of the 5th Company, Sturmgeschütz Battalion, and also promoted to Obersturmführer (First Lieutenant) in November 1944.

After the defeat in the Ardennes offensive, the Frundsberg Division in January 1945 was part of Army Group G and involved in Operation Nordwind together with the 6th SS Mountain Division Nord over the night of the 16–17 January in which they were tasked with making a breakthrough of the Allied line and forming a bridgehead at Hagenau for the following attack.

The attack was to be led by the 3rd Company, 10th SS Panzer Regiment with Obersturmführer Bachmann now the battalion adjutant in command. Mounted on a motorcycle, he attacked and destroyed a Sherman tank with a Panzerfaust in Herrlisheim; more Allied tanks were destroyed by the accompanying Panther tanks. In the following fighting, 60 prisoners were taken, and 20 Germans from the 553rd Volksgrenadier Division that had been captured by the Americans were released and rearmed. Also 12 Sherman tanks were captured intact. While there are no surviving official German military records of this happening, American combat logs from the 12th Armored Division confirm that the 43rd Tank Battalion was encircled inside Herrlisheim at this exact time.

The attack continued from Herrlisheim towards Drusenheim, and a further 9 tanks were destroyed. The captured Sherman tanks were formed into the 13th Company, 10th SS Panzer Regiment until the end of the war.

For these actions, Erwin Bachmann was awarded the Knight's Cross in February 1945.

Bachman was next in combat in Pomerania with the 1st Company at Christinenberg destroying a number of T-34 tanks. In May 1945, they moved west, and in the area of Göttingen–Sandbostel, they were captured by the British.

Bachmann died on 18 February 2010 and was buried in Göttingen.
