= Michael Palme =

German journalist

Michael Palme (1943 in Prague – February 10, 2010, in Wiesbaden) was a German journalist with a particular interest in sports. He also served as a television host and commentator for ZDF for many years.

In 2000, the Nationales Olympisches Komitee für Deutschland (National Olympic Committee for Germany) awarded Palme the Silbernen Kugel for his coverage of the Summer Olympics, held in Sydney.
