= Bert Padden =

Scottish football referee

Bartley "Bert" Padden (1932 – May 2010) was a Scottish football referee who officiated in the Scottish Football League in the 1960s and 1970s.

One of Padden's most famous matches occurred when he sent off John Greig of Rangers and Alex Ferguson of Falkirk in 1969.

Ardrossan based Padden's senior career ended suddenly in November 1972 when he had a heart attack during a Rangers v Dumbarton game at Ibrox. Though he never returned to the League middle, happily he did enjoy many subsequent years of good health.
