= Kiwi Soccers =

- Full name: Kiwi Soccers Football Club
- Founded: 2010
- Stadium: PCC Track & Field Stadium
- Capacity: 4,000
- League: ASFA Soccer League
- 2012: 8th – relegation play-off (season ongoing)
Home colors	Away colors

Kiwi Soccers is an American Samoan football club, currently playing in the ASFA Soccer League Division 1, the top level of football in American Samoa.

== League performance ==
=== 2010 ===
The club first competed in the ASFA Soccer League in 2010, finishing third in Pool A and qualifying for the knockout rounds. In the preliminary round they beat Ilaoa and Toomata 1–0 before losing 0–3 to Fagasa Youth in the quarter final.

=== 2011 ===
The club finished fourth in pool A in the 2011 season and did not progress to the knockout rounds.

=== 2012 ===
The club finished bottom of Division 1 in the 2012 season and will have to play a relegation play-off to avoid demotion to division 2.

== Women's team ==
The club also run a women's team.
