= Fritz Grösche =

German footballer and coach

Personal information
- Date of birth: 3 October 1941
- Date of death: 24 October 2010 (aged 69)
- Position: Midfielder

Senior career*
Years	Team	Apps	(Gls)
–	Mindener SV	?	(?)
–	Westfalia Herne	?	(?)
–	SV Sodingen	?	(?)
Total		?	(?)

Managerial career
- 1978–1980: FC Gütersloh
- 1982–1983: TuS Schloß Neuhaus
- 1984–1987: SC Verl
- 1991–1992: Arminia Bielefeld
- 1997–1999: SC Verl
- 2005: FC Gütersloh
- 2008: SC Wiedenbrück II
- * Club domestic league appearances and goals

Fritz Grösche (3 October 1941 – 24 October 2010) was a German professional football player and coach.

== Career ==
Grösche played club football for Mindener SV, Westfalia Herne and SV Sodingen.

After retiring as a player, Grösche coached a number of German teams, including FC Gütersloh, TuS Schloß Neuhaus, SC Verl, Arminia Bielefeld and SC Wiedenbrück II.

== Death ==
Grösche died on 24 October 2010, from cancer, at the age of 69.
