= Mao Mengsuo =

Chinese footballer

Personal information
- Full name: Mao Mengsuo
- Date of birth: 15 June 1989
- Place of birth: Changsha, Hunan, China
- Date of death: 12 June 2010 (aged 20)
- Place of death: Nyingchi, Tibet, China
- Height: 1.75 m (5 ft 9 in)
- Position: Winger

Youth career
- 2002–2003: Bayi Zhenbang
- 2006–2008: Tai Po

Senior career*
Years	Team	Apps	(Gls)
2008–2010	Tai Po	0	(0)
- * Club domestic league appearances and goals

Mao Mengsuo (simplified Chinese: 毛梦索; traditional Chinese: 毛夢索; pinyin: Máo Mèngsuǒ, 15 June 1989 – 12 June 2010) was a Chinese professional footballer who played as a winger.

== Club career ==
Mao had only one appearance in the first season of his professional football career. He appeared in a 2008–09 Hong Kong FA Cup match, which saw Tai Po defeating Tuen Mun Progoal by 3 goals.

Mao did not appear in the next season. He was back on the field in the 2009–10 season, when he was an unused substitute in five matches.

== Honours ==
Tai Po

- Hong Kong FA Cup: 2008–09

== Death ==
Mao and his girlfriend, Li Zhuoling (Chinese: 李卓玲), went to Tibet to teach rural children in June 2010. During this period, they were killed in a car accident. Tai Po's general secretary Chan Ping said he shall be one of the main members of first team next year, and the club decided that the club would no longer use the number 16 shirt Mao wore.
