= Stefan Schmitt (politician) =

German jurist and politician

Stefan Schmitt (September 19, 1963 – April 14, 2010) was a German jurist and politician.

Schmitt was born in Berlin. He was a member of the SDP. Schmitt died of leukemia.

== Life ==
Stefan Schmitt studied law and worked as a lawyer in the law firm Wied, Schmitt and Partner from 1991. He was admitted to the Hamburg Regional Court in 1991 and to the Hanseatic Higher Regional Court in 1996. His main areas of work were labor law and tenancy law.

From 1991 to 2001, he was a member of the Harburg District Assembly. In February 2008, he was elected to the Hamburg Parliament on the SPD state list. For his parliamentary group he became a member of the legal committee as well as the constitutional and district committee. In addition to his party-political commitment, he was a member of the Workers' Welfare Association and the trade union Ver.di.

Stefan Schmitt fell ill with leukaemia in 2009. He died on 14 April 2010.
