= Fred Blankemeijer =

Dutch footballer

Personal information
- Full name: Fredrik Klaas Blankemeijer
- Date of birth: 13 August 1926
- Place of birth: Rotterdam, Netherlands
- Date of death: 8 November 2010 (aged 84)
- Place of death: Rotterdam, Netherlands
- Height: 2.00 m (6 ft 7 in)
- Position: Defender

Senior career*
Years	Team	Apps	(Gls)
1949–1952	Feijenoord	28	(0)

Managerial career
- Feyenoord (youth coach)
- Feyenoord (scout)
- Feyenoord (board member)
- Feyenoord (technical director)
- * Club domestic league appearances and goals

Fred Blankemeijer (13 August 1926 – 8 November 2010) was a Dutch footballer who was active as a defender. A one-club man, he was member of Feijenoord for over 70 years.

== Club career ==
Born in Rotterdam-Charlois, Blankemeijer lost his father during World War II when the latter was torpedoed by the Germans in December 1940 while working as a merchant captain. A tall but skinny defender, Blankemeijer made his debut at Feijenoord, and played a total of 28 matches for the club between 1949 and 1953.

== Retirement ==
After his career he would serve the club for many years in many occupations. He was a youth coach, a scout, a board member as well as a technical director. He was decorated Knight of the Order of Orange-Nassau in 2004. In June 2010 he served Feyenoord for a total of 70 years.

Widely regarded as a real club icon, he died of pneumonia, aged 84, on 8 November 2010.

== See also ==
- List of one-club men
