= Gert Haller =

German manager, politician and lobbyist

Gert Haller (30 April 1944, in Tübingen – 11 April 2010, in Bremen) was a German manager, politician and lobbyist of the Austrian financial group Wüstenrot & Württembergische AG. He died after a short serious illness aged 65.
