= Paul Müller (biologist) =

German professor of biology, and biogeographer

Paul Müller (11 October 1940 – 30 May 2010) was a German professor of biology at the University of Trier. He was born in Gersweiler and died in Saarland.

The focus of his work was biogeography, in particular in the Neotropics. His Ph.D. work was on birds and other vertebrates of the Ilha de São Sebastião (Brazil). Subsequently, his studies focussed on herpetofauna, tropical ecology and sustainability of hunting.

== Awards ==
- Ordre national du Mérite (1984)
- Bundesverdienstkreuz (1994)
- Honorary Doctorate of Chiang Mai University (1988)
- Honorary Doctorate of Yokohama National University (1989)

== See also ==
- Jürgen Haffer
