= Erich Steidtmann =

Nazi SS officer (1914–2010)

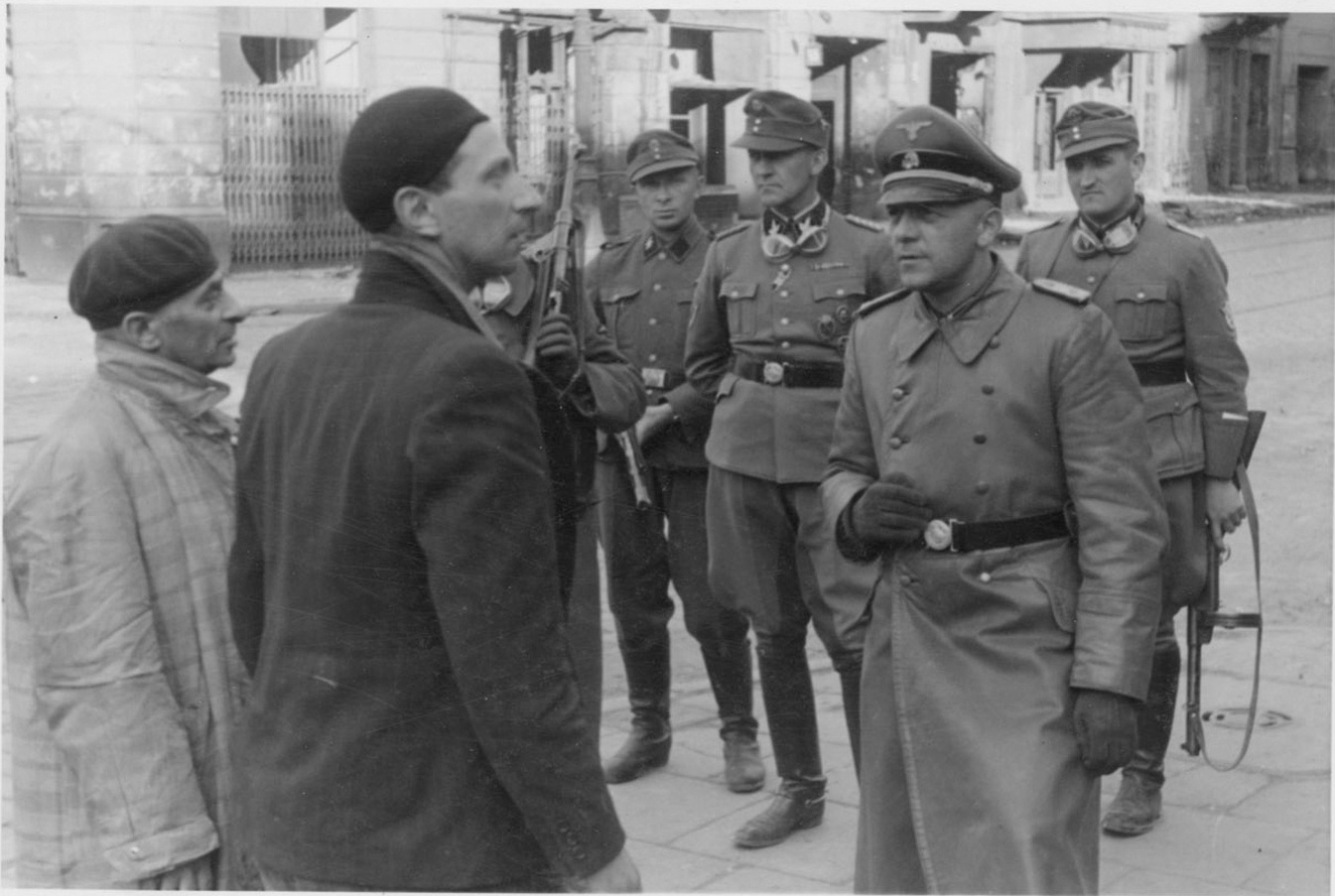
Warsaw Ghetto Uprising - Photo from Jürgen Stroop Report to Heinrich Himmler from May 1943. On the photograph Maximilian von Herff questions two Jewish resistance fighters as Stroop (rear, center) and his aide Karl Kaleske (right) observe (possibly Erich Steidtmann) {?}. Probably taken during Herff's trip May 14–15, 1943

Erich Steidtmann (November 15, 1914 – July 25, 2010) was a Nazi SS officer believed to have been involved in the liquidation of the Warsaw Ghetto Uprising, the largest single revolt by the Jews during the Holocaust, the bulk of which occurred from April 19 until May 16, 1943, ending when the resistance was crushed by German troops under the direct command of Jürgen Stroop. Efforts were being undertaken by German prosecutors in the months before his death to prosecute Steidtmann for his involvement in war crimes.

== Early life ==
Steidtmann was born on November 15, 1914, in Weißenfels and joined the SS on June 1, 1933. In 1942, as commander of a police unit, the Third Battalion of Police Regiment 22, Steidtmann guarded trains used for the deportation of Polish Jews from the Warsaw Ghetto to the Treblinka extermination camp. His unit remained in the ghetto through 1943, where it would have been involved in the liquidation of the Ghetto under Gen. Jürgen Stroop in which 55,000 people were killed or sent to the death camps. Though Steidtmann had denied that he was involved in the events in the Warsaw Ghetto, witnesses placed him there. He was later assigned to Police Battalion 101, which was involved in the November 1943 "Harvest Festival" in which Jews in camps near Lublin were systematically shot and killed. Steidtmann also claimed not to have been in the area during the killings in Lublin, saying he had been on leave, but letters he had written at the time provided evidence that he was present.

Steidtmann was captured by British forces after the conclusion of the war, but was not tried. He became a police officer in Essen, but was dismissed for misconduct in 1956. He then became a driving instructor in Hanover. Steidtmann had been questioned on a number of occasions during the 1960s, but had never been charged with any crimes.

== Later life ==
In 2007, an autobiography written by a German woman stated that she had had an affair with Steidtmann during the war, and Steidtmann filed a libel suit against the author, Lisl Urban, arguing that his "honor had been besmirched". In mounting its defense, the book's publishers Joachim Jahns contacted the Simon Wiesenthal Center's staff in Germany, which found evidence that Steidtmann had earlier admitted to being involved in the suppression of the Warsaw Ghetto Uprising. In April 2007, the Süddeutsche Zeitung printed a letter that included a military code that showed he had been in Lublin during the massacres there. German prosecutors initiated efforts to confirm his presence in Lublin during the period in question.

While the investigation was in progress, Steidtmann died of a heart attack at age 95, on July 25, 2010. Dr. Efraim Zuroff of the Simon Wiesenthal Center expressed his frustration with Steidtmann's death and the general difficulties in bringing suspected Nazi war criminals to justice more than six decades after the end of World War II, saying "I sometimes say that I am the only Jew in the world who prays for the health of Nazi war criminals". Zuroff noted that the Center would never have become involved in the investigation if Steidtmann had not brought attention to his case by filing the libel suit and that "had the prosecutors done their job properly in the sixties, he would not have escaped justice".

== Sources ==
- Joachim Jahns, Der Warschauer Ghettokönig, Leipzig 2009, ISBN 978-3-928498-99-9
