= Franz-Hermann Brüner =

Franz-Hermann Brüner (14 September 1945 – 9 January 2010) was a German public official who served as the director-general of the European Anti-Fraud Office (OLAF). He was first appointed to the post in 2000, and was reappointed to the post in 2006 over the European Parliament’s preferred candidate.

Brüner was born in Bad Nauheim in Hesse and began his working life as an apprentice businessman in Darmstadt in 1968. Three years later he went to LMU Munich to study law, economics and political science. In 1976, he joined the Ministry of Justice in Bavaria to train for the judiciary.

In 1979, he became an investigating and trial judge in criminal matters at the Municipal Court Weilheim in Oberbayern. He transferred to be public prosecutor in Munich in 1981, and because Deputy Head of the Criminal Law section of the German Federal Ministry of Justice from 1983 to 1986. He was then transferred back to be a full Judge in Weilheim, where he served for a further three years.

Brüner then became Deputy Head of the Criminal Law Department of the Public Prosecutor's office in Munich, and in 1991 was Senior Public Prosecutor at the Office of the General Prosecutor in Berlin. He headed the Criminal Law Department of the Ministry of Justice in Saxony from 1993 to 1995 before becoming Senior Prosecutor in the Office of the General Prosecutor in Munich for a year. From 1996 to 1998 he was made Head of the Department fighting against organised crime, fraud and corruption.

His first post outside Germany was in April 1998 when he was appointed Head of the Anti-Fraud Unit and Deputy Head of the Economics Department of the Office of the High Representative for Bosnia and Herzegovina. He was still working there when appointed to be director of OLAF from 1 March 2000.

Dutch EP member Paul van Buitenen has criticized Brüner heavily on several occasions, suggesting that the fraud hunter acted less than scrupulously himself. In particular, selection procedures for staff are suspected to have been irregular, lacking in transparency and not in accordance with the Staff Regulations of the European Commission.

Brüner died on 9 January 2010.
