= Manfred Römbell =

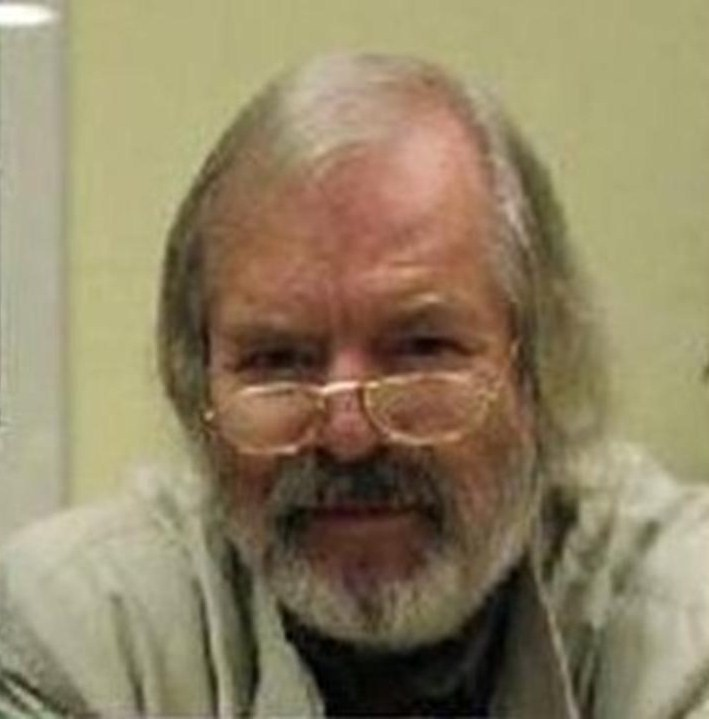
Manfred Römbell.

Manfred Römbell (3 December 1941, Bildstock – 22 June 2010, Saarbrücken) was a German author.

== Awards ==
- 1969 Kurt-Magnus-Preis established by the ARD
- 1975 Reisestipendium des Auswärtigen Amtes
- 1986 Kunstpreis der Stadt Saarbrücken
- 2002 Otto-Weil-Kulturpreis der Stadt Friedrichsthal
- 2004 Stipendium des Künstlerhauses Schloss Wiepersdorf

== Works ==
- 1971: Kaltluft, Pforzheim
- Kurze Prozesse. 17 Texte. Wolfgang Fietkau Verlag, Berlin 1973 (Schritte 23), ISBN 3-87352-023-0.
- 1976: Richtig lebendig wird es auf dem Friedhof im Herbst, München
- 1977: Brennen mit Licht, Köln
- 1980: Das nächste Fest soll noch größer werden, Dillingen
- 1981: Stadt und Land, Dillingen (zusammen mit Jürgen Proföhr und Udo Wolter)
- 1982: Durchsichtig ist das Land, Rastatt
- 1984: Vogesenflut, Saarbrücken
- 1989: Rotstraßenzeit, Landau/Pfalz
- 1993: Rotstraßenträume, Landau/Pfalz
- 1995: Grenzüberschreitung, Saarbrücken
- 1996: Rotstraßenende, Blieskastel
- 2001: FernsehSpott, Frankfurt am Main
- 2007: Was blieb von all den Blicken, Blieskastel
- 2009: Doppelleben. Gollenstein-Verl., Merzig 2009, 357 pages, ISBN 978-3-938823-49-1.
