= Jorge Bontemps =

Argentine footballer (1977–2010)

Jorge Alberto Bontemps
Personal information
- Full name: Jorge Alberto Bontemps
- Date of birth: August 21, 1977
- Place of birth: Santa Fe, Argentina
- Date of death: April 13, 2010 (aged 32)
- Place of death: Santa Fe, Argentina
- Position: Defender

Senior career*
Years	Team	Apps	(Gls)
1999–2004	Colón de Santa Fe	64	(0)
2004–2006	Huracán	31	(0)
- * Club domestic league appearances and goals

Jorge Alberto Bontemps (August 21, 1977 – April 13, 2010) was an Argentine football defender.

== Club career ==
Bontemps started his career in 1999 with Colón de Santa Fe before moving to Club Atlético Huracán in 2004.

== Illness and death ==
Since 2006 Bontemps has been sidelined by disease and has not made any appearances for the first team.

On 13 April 2010 he died of lung cancer in the José María Cullen hospital in Santa Fe.
