= Hans Joachim Sewering =

Hans Joachim Sewering (30 January 1916 – 18 June 2010) was a German doctor. In World War II, he is alleged to have participated in transferring 900 handicapped Catholic children into a camp where they were killed.

== Biography ==
Sewering was born on 30 January 1916, 17 years to the day before Adolf Hitler came to power. Sewering joined the SS on 1 November 1933 for "social reasons", claiming that young men were "simply the victims of propaganda." A year later, he joined the Nazi Party. In the summer of 1942, he worked as assistant physician at the Schönbrunn Sanitarium, near Dachau in Bavaria. According to two nuns who broke their silence in 1993, he killed 900 physically and mentally handicapped children by transferring them from Schönbrunn to the Eglfing-Haar "healing center", a facility south of Munich. One of these children he was accused of killing, the 14-year-old Babette Fröwis whom he consigned to Eglfing-Harr as epileptic, was never examined by him. She later became a postergirl for the practice of Nazi euthanasia. Sewering denied these allegations. However, he was barred from entering the United States on these grounds and Jewish organizations called for him to be tried for murder.

After World War II, he became a respected physician, and earned the praise of noted doctor Wolfgang Wesiack. Sewering, who became the head of the German Medical Association in 1993 lived in Dachau in his latter years. A San Francisco Bay Area physician who lost 26 relatives in the Holocaust, Dr. Michael Franzblau, spent years attempting to have Sewering indicted for war crimes.

In May 2008, the German Federation of Internal Medicine awarded Sewering the Gunther-Budelmann medal for services to the nation’s health system, its highest honor. The Anti-Defamation League condemned this, saying that "to honor an accused war criminal, one who is alleged to have used medicine for harm, is an insult to those who have suffered under the Nazis".
