= Gisela Karau =

- Born: March 28, 1932
- Died: April 9, 2010 (aged 78); Berlin, Germany
- Writing career
- Language: German

Gisela Karau (birth name: Wilczynski; 28 March 1932 in Berlin – 9 April 2010 in Berlin) was an East German journalist and author of children's literature. Born in Berlin, she was married and had two children.

== Life ==
Gisela Karau was born in Berlin 1932. After finishing her school leaving examination in 1950 she began a five-year job training at the newspaper BZ am Abend. She worked as a reporter and a columnist for that newspaper until 1990 on a freelance basis. In the 1960s she began writing children's literature. Her first work was the novel Der gute Stern des Janusz K. (1972). The book is about the fate of Polish children in Buchenwald concentration camp. The book became famous and was also reprinted after 1990. Other popular children's books in the GDR written by Gisela Karau include Darf ich Wilhelm zu Dir sagen? (1979) about Wilhelm Pieck's life and Loni (1982) about a girl in Berlin a few years after World War II. Furthermore, she wrote the screenplays of many children's films produced by DEFA, the state-owned film studio. The film Mein blauer Vogel fliegt was based on Der gute Stern des Janusz K..

She also published books for adults, like the novels Berliner Liebe (1984) and Familienkrach (1988) in the GDR. In 1986, Karau was awarded the Goethe prize of the City of Berlin. After the German reunification she wrote some novels about the destiny of people in the GDR, in the Wende and in the New states of Germany after 1990. She also published more children's books like Bolle, der freundliche Hund (1994), Küsse auf Eis (1997) and Das kommt in der besten Familie vor (2003).

Gisela Karau married Günter Karau, with whom she had two children. After the death of her first husband in 1986, she married Hans-Jürgen Dörry, 18 years her junior, in 1988. She died in 2010 in a Berlin hospital.

== Works (selection) ==
Children's literature

- Der gute Stern des Janusz K. Kinderbuchverlag Berlin, Berlin 1972 (The good star of Janusz K.)
- Darf ich Wilhelm zu Dir sagen? Kinderbuchverlag Berlin, Berlin 1979 (Can I call you Wilhelm?)
- Loni. Kinderbuchverlag Berlin, Berlin 1982
- Bolle, der freundliche Hund. Kiro-Verlag, Schwedt 1994 (Bolle, the friendly dog)
- Küsse auf Eis. Karl-Dietz-Verlag, Berlin 1997 (Kisses on ice)
- Das kommt in der besten Familie vor. Cecilie-Dressler-Verlag, Hamburg 2003
- Toni und Ali. Bilder einer Jugendliebe. Edition Hamouda, Leipzig 2007
- Cosima. Verliebt in Sanssouci. Edition Hamouda, Leipzig 2007

Novels

- Berliner Liebe. Verlag Neues Leben, Berlin 1984 (Berlin love)
- Familienkrach. Verlag Neues Leben, Berlin 1988 (Family quarrel)
- Ein gemachter Mann. Verlag Neues Leben, 1991 (A made man)
- Marthas Haus oder Der Kopf im Keller. Kiro-Verlag, Schwedt 1994 (Martha's house or the head in the basement)

== Literature ==
- Bernd-Rainer Barth, Andreas Kölling: Karau, Gisela. In: Wer war wer in der DDR? 4. Ausgabe. Ch. Links Verlag, Berlin 2006, ISBN 3-86153-364-2, Band 1, S. 485. (Who was who in the GDR?)
