= Ambrosius Eßer =

German historian (1933–2010)

Ambrosius Eßer OP (born Klaus Eßer, also spelled Eszer, or Esser; 19 November 1933 in Düsseldorf – 12 April 2010 in Berlin) was a German church historian and member of the Dominican Order. He died of a pulmonary embolism.

Eszer served for many years as professor at the Pontifical University of St. Thomas Aquinas, Angelicum in Rome, Italy.

== Honours ==
- Germany 1987: Great Cross of Merit of the Federal Republic of Germany
- Austria 1996: Austrian Cross of Honour for Science and Art, 1st class
- Austria 2008: Grand Decoration of Honour in Silver for Services to the Republic of Austria
- Vatican City 2008: Medal Pro Ecclesia et Pontifice
