= Elektrische Viktoria =

Car model

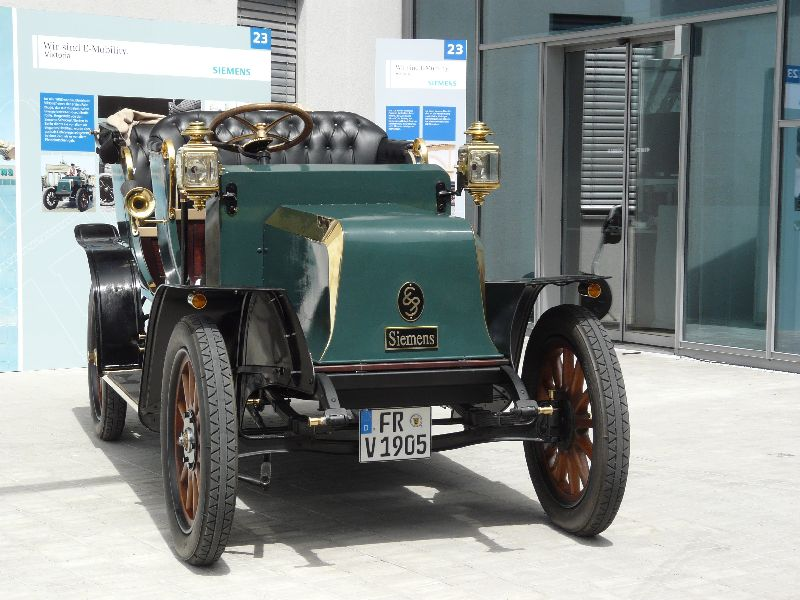
2010 replica of the Siemens "Elektrische Viktoria"

The Elektrische Viktoria was an electric car built in several versions by Siemens between 1905 and 1909 in Berlin. The versions comprised a four-seat convertible (advertised and used as a hotel taxi), a minibus with a box-like structure (much like a pickup), and a van.

Top speed was 30 km/h (19 mph). The electric motor operated at a nominal potential of 88 volts and a maximum current of 40 amperes. The maximum power was 3.520 kW (about 4.8 HP). The cruising range was 60 km with the smaller battery version and 80 km with the larger battery version.

The car was built in the Berlin-based factory Siemens-Schuckertwerke, a Siemens subsidiary. The total number of units built is not known, but, according to Siemens internal records, probably between 30 and 50 were produced. The price was steep by 1905 standards, at 11000 to 17500 Marks, depending on the model and battery capacity. At the time, a worker's monthly wages were in the range of 120 to 150 Marks.

== Development ==
Regenerative braking was added during development, i.e., while braking the electric motor's operation was reversed, turning it into an electric generator charging the battery. This allowed the available kinetic energy to be turned into extended cruising range.

== 2010 replica ==
In 2010 Siemens built a full-scale replica, based on partial sketches and three photographic images. Only the battery was modified for environmental reasons, avoiding the original lead based battery technology. The lighting was modernized in order to receive official approval for operation on public roads. Siemens rebuilt the city car type B "Electrical Viktoria open". The weight is 1530 kg, to which the battery alone contributes 480 kg. Fully charging the battery takes between five and a half to six hours on 220 volt mains. The car was approved on April 8, 2010 and presented to the public in Berlin on April 30.

On June 21, 2010, the replica was involved an accident in the environs of Hinterzarten, a resort village in the Black Forest, when the car suddenly veered off the road and into an embankment at full speed. The driver and leader of the replica project, Wilfried Feldenkirchen, a professor of economic history, was killed, when he was ejected from the car. Four accompanying students were injured, two seriously.

== Sources ==
- Fact-Sheet-Victorian Siemens AG
