= Guillermo León =

Costa Rican footballer (died 2010)

Personal information
- Full name: Guillermo León Quirós
- Date of death: 8 July 2010 (aged 82)
- Place of death: San José, Costa Rica
- Position: Inside left

Senior career*
| Years | Team | Apps | (Gls) |
| 1947– | Saprissa | | |
- Universidad Nacional
- Nicolás Marín
| –1958 | UD Moravia | | |

International career
| | Costa Rica | 17 | |
- * Club domestic league appearances and goals

Guillermo "Viriguas" León Quirós (died 7 July 2010) was a Costa Rican football player.

== Club career ==
He played with Deportivo Saprissa during the 1940s and 1950s, and was a member of that team when it reached Costa Rica's First Division in 1949. León scored 47 goals in 1947 while playing with Saprissa in the Third Division, and next year scored 33 goals with the team in the Second Division, after which the team rose to the First Division. He also scored once in their first match at the highest level, a 3-1 win over La Libertad on 21 August 1949.

He also played for Universidad Nacional, Nicolás Marín and Unión Deportiva Moravia in a career spanning from 1947 through 1958.

== Death ==
On 8 July 2010, León died at age 82 after suffering from Alzheimer's disease.
