= Alper Balaban =

Turkish-German footballer (1987–2010)

Personal information
- Date of birth: 9 August 1987
- Place of birth: Heilbronn, West Germany
- Date of death: 12 April 2010 (aged 22)
- Place of death: Karlsruhe, Germany
- Height: 1.75 m (5 ft 9 in)
- Position: Striker

Youth career
- 1992–2005: 1899 Hoffenheim
- 2005–2007: Fenerbahçe PAF

Senior career*
Years	Team	Apps	(Gls)
2005–2008	Fenerbahçe U-23	58	(16)
2007	Fenerbahçe	1	(0)
2008	→ Kocaelispor (loan)	4	(0)
2008–2009	→ Bucaspor (loan)	13	(0)
2009	İnegölspor	14	(0)
2009	Eskişehirspor	2	(0)
2009–2010	Tavşanlı Linyitspor		

International career
2006	Turkey U21	1	(0)
- * Club domestic league appearances and goals

Alper Balaban (9 August 1987 – 12 April 2010) was a Turkish-German footballer who started his career with Fenerbahçe.

Balaban was raised in Gemmingen and Heilbronn. He began his career with German club TSG 1899 Hoffenheim. In 2005, he was transferred to Fenerbahçe. He made his debut in a Turkish Cup match against Sivasspor on 11 November 2006 and was brought on in the 82nd minute.

Balaban played 58 times for Fenerbahçe PAF and scored 16 goals.

On 5 April 2010 he was involved in a car accident in Bretten, Germany, and died seven days later on 12 April 2010.
