= Wilfried Feldenkirchen =

German professor and economic historian

Wilfried Paul Feldenkirchen (October 25, 1947 – June 21, 2010) was a German professor and economic historian.

== Life ==
Wilfried Feldenkirchen was born in Cologne and studied history, English studies and economics at the University of Bonn. He was awarded a doctorate in 1974 for his thesis on Commerce in the City of Cologne in the 18th Century. In 1980, he earned a Habilitation with his thesis on The Iron and Steel Industry of the Ruhr District 1879-1914. Feldenkirchen was awarded the Heinz Maier-Leibnitz-Preis in 1982. In 1985, he became a professor at the University of Bonn, where he was also director of the University Academic Exchange Service. He held a professorship at Saarland University in 1989/1990, and was appointed to the chair of economic, social and business history at the University of Erlangen-Nuremberg in 1990. In the same year he published a biography of Werner von Siemens and also collaborated on the Encyclopedia of German History. The focus of his academic work was the economic history of the 19th and 20th centuries, the history of banks and savings banks, and the history of agricultural policy. Feldenkirchen was a Rotary Club member (Rotary Club of Euskirchen-Burgfey).

In 2010, Feldenkirchen was killed in a car accident in Hinterzarten while test-driving a replica Siemens Elektrische Viktoria, for which he was the project manager. The replica was built by a coachbuilder from Hinterzarten and had been shown by Siemens at the Shanghai Expo 2010.

== Works ==
- In collaboration with Susanne Hilger: Menschen und Marken: 125 Jahre Henkel, 1876–2001. Publisher: Henkel, Düsseldorf 2001, ISBN 3-923-32479-0 (404 Pp., henkel.de [PDF]).
- Die deutsche Wirtschaft im 20. Jahrhundert. München 1998, ISBN 3-486-55744-0.
- Werner von Siemens. Erfinder und internationaler Unternehmer. Berlin 1992, ISBN 3-8009-4156-2.
- Die Eisen- und Stahlindustrie des Ruhrgebiets 1879–1914. Wachstum, Finanzierung und Struktur ihrer Großunternehmen. Wiesbaden 1982, ISBN 3-515-03463-3.
- Der Handel der Stadt Köln im 18. Jahrhundert (1700–1814). Bonn 1975.

== Awards ==
- 1987: Newcomen-Preis of the University of Erlangen-Nuremberg
- 1982: Heinz-Maier-Leibnitz-Preis
