= 2007–08 Guam Men's Soccer League =

Guam Men's Soccer League
- Season: 2007–08
- Champions: Quality Distributors

Statistics of Guam League for the 2007–08 season.

== League standings ==
Pos	Team	Pld	W	D	L	GF	GA	GD	Pts
1	Quality Distributors	20	14	3	3	81	27	+54	45
2	Guam Shipyard	20	13	3	4	60	33	+27	42
3	Paintco Strykers	20	8	2	10	54	66	−12	26
4	IT&E Crushers	20	7	3	10	52	64	−12	24
5	No Ka Oi	20	2	1	17	55	112	−57	7

Source: rsssf.com
