= 2009–10 Guam Men's Soccer League =

Guam Men's Soccer League
- Season: 2009–10
- Champions: Quality Distributors

2009–10 Guam Men's Soccer League, officially named Budweiser Guam Men's Soccer League due to sponsorship reason, is the association football league of Guam.

== League standings ==
=== Division 1 ===
Pos	Team	Pld	W	D	L	GF	GA	GD	Pts
1	Quality Distributors (C)	20	20	0	0	116	26	+90	60
2	Paintco Strykers	20	15	1	4	102	30	+72	46
3	Guam Shipyard	20	6	4	10	29	42	−13	22
4	NO KA OI	20	6	2	12	49	88	−39	20
5	Bank of Guam Crushers	20	6	1	13	49	78	−29	19
6	Carpet Masters	20	2	2	16	13	94	−81	8

Source: rsssf.com
(C) Champions

=== Division 2 ===
1. Hauauau 2. Ha 3.Maasas 4. Hadsasasa
