= 2010 FFAS Senior League =

ASFA Soccer League
- Season: 2010
- Champions: Pago Youth
- Matches: 57
- Goals: 301 (5.28 per match)
- Biggest home win: Vailoatai Youth 15–1 Tafuna Jets B
- Biggest away win: Tafuna Jets B 0–10 FC SKBC
- Highest scoring: Vailoatai Youth 15–1 Tafuna Jets B

The 2010 season of the ASFA Soccer League was the thirtieth season of association football competition in American Samoa. Pago Youth won the championship, their second recorded title, with the winners of the 2006 league competition and a number of previous seasons unknown.

All games were played at the Kananafou Theological Seminary College Sports Field due to the FFAS soccer field in Pago Pago undergoing improvements due to the damage after the 2009 Samoa earthquake and tsunami.

== Format ==
Fifteen teams competed in the league divided into two groups, one of seven, the other of eight teams. The top two teams in each group qualified automatically for the quarter-final stage. Teams that finished in positions three to six in each group qualified for a preliminary round to determine the other four teams to compete in the quarter-finals. The group stage was played on a round robin basis and all knockout rounds were one-legged.

== Pool A ==
=== Table ===
Pos	Team	Pld	W	D	L	GF	GA	GD	Pts	Qualification
1	Black Roses (Q)	5	4	1	0	31	8	+23	13	Qualification for Quarter finals
2	Fagasa Youth (Q)	6	2	4	0	14	11	+3	10	Qualification for Quarter finals
3	Kiwi Soccers (Q)	6	3	1	2	18	25	−7	10	Qualification for Preliminary round
4	Utulei Youth (Q)	6	3	0	3	19	16	+3	9	Qualification for Preliminary round
5	Tafuna Jets A (Q)	5	2	1	2	9	10	−1	7	Qualification for Preliminary round
6	Ilaoa and Toomata (Q)	6	2	0	4	12	19	−7	6	Qualification for Preliminary round
7	Pago Youth B	6	0	1	5	11	25	−14	1	

Updated to match(es) played on 23 November 2010. Source:
Rules for classification: 1) points; 2) goal difference; 3) number of goals scored.
(Q) Qualified for the phase indicated

=== Results ===
Home \ Away	BLR	FAY	I&T	KWS	PYB	TAF	UTU
Black Roses			7–2		9–2		5–3
Fagasa Youth	1–1				1–1		2–1
Ilaoa and Toomata		3–5		5–1		0–1	
Kiwi Soccers	0–9	3–3			5–3		
Pago Youth B			1–2			2–3	2–5
Tafuna Jets		2–2		2–3			
Utulei Youth			4–0	3–6		3–1	

Updated to match(es) played on 23 November 2010. Source:
Legend: Blue = home team win; Yellow = draw; Red = away team win.

Note 1: Pool was played on a round robin basis, results are reported as per RSSSF, hence why some teams appear to have played more "home" games than others.
Note 2: The final round match between Black Roses and Tafuna Jets A was not played.

== Pool B ==
=== Table ===
Pos	Team	Pld	W	D	L	GF	GA	GD	Pts	Qualification
1	Pago Youth A (Q)	7	7	0	0	23	6	+17	21	Qualification for Quarter finals
2	Vailoatai Youth (Q)	7	5	1	1	42	9	+33	16	Qualification for Quarter finals
3	FC SKBC (Q)	7	4	2	1	27	7	+20	14	Qualification for Preliminary round
4	Lion Heart (Q)	6	3	1	2	18	9	+9	10	Qualification for Preliminary round
5	PanSa (Q)	6	2	0	4	14	12	+2	6	Qualification for Preliminary round
6	Lauli'i (Q)	6	2	0	4	11	21	−10	6	Qualification for Preliminary round
7	Green Bay	7	0	1	6	8	40	−32	1	
8	Tafuna Jets B	6	0	1	5	3	42	−39	1	

Updated to match(es) played on 23 November 2010. Source:
Rules for classification: 1) points; 2) goal difference; 3) number of goals scored.
(Q) Qualified for the phase indicated

Note: SKBC stands for South Korean Baptist Church.

=== Results ===
Home \ Away	SKB	GRE	LAU	LIO	PYA	PSM	TAF	VLY
FC SKBC			2–1	0–0				1–1
Green Bay	1–10					1–7		1–10
Lauli'i		4–3			0–2		4–0	
Lion Heart		5–1			1–3	2–1	10–2	
Pago Youth A	3–2	4–1				5–0	3–0	
PanSa Men's	1–2		4–0					1–2
Tafuna Jets	0–10	0–0						
Vailoatai Youth			10–2	2–0	2–3		15–1	

Updated to match(es) played on 23 November 2010. Source:
Legend: Blue = home team win; Yellow = draw; Red = away team win.

Note 1: Pool was played on a round robin basis, results are reported as per RSSSF, hence why some teams appear to have played more "home" games than others.
Note 2: The match between Pago Youth A and Tafuna Jets B was forfeited by Tafuna and awarded 3–0 to Pago Youth.
Note 3: The final round match between Tafuna Jets B and PanSa as well as Lauli'i and Lion Heart were not played.

== Knockout stage ==
=== Preliminary round ===
25 November 2010

Utulei Youth	3–1	Tafuna Jets
Unknown	Source	Unknown

Kananafou Theological Seminary College Sports Field
25 November 2010

Kiwi Soccers	1–0	Ilaoa and Toomata
Unknown	Source	Unknown

Kananafou Theological Seminary College Sports Field
25 November 2010

Lion Heart	w/o	PanSa
Unknown	Source	Unknown

Kananafou Theological Seminary College Sports Field

Note:Lion Heart won by walkover.

25 November 2010

FC SKBC	2–1	Lauli'i
Unknown	Source	Unknown

Kananafou Theological Seminary College Sports Field

=== Quarter finals ===
27 November 2010

Black Roses	2–1	Utulei Youth
Unknown	Source	Unknown

Kananafou Theological Seminary College Sports Field
27 November 2010

Fagasa Youth	3–0	Kiwi Soccers
Unknown	Source	Unknown

Kananafou Theological Seminary College Sports Field
27 November 2010

Pago Youth A	2–1	Lion Heart
Unknown	Source	Unknown

Kananafou Theological Seminary College Sports Field
27 November 2010

Vailoatai Youth	4–3	FC SKBC
Unknown	Source	Unknown

Kananafou Theological Seminary College Sports Field

=== Semi finals ===
27 November 2010

Black Roses	1–0 (a.e.t.)	Vailoatai Youth
Unknown	Source	Unknown

Kananafou Theological Seminary College Sports Field
27 November 2010

Pago Youth A	4–1	Fagasa Youth
Unknown	Source	Unknown

Kananafou Theological Seminary College Sports Field

=== Third place match ===
4 December 2010

Fagasa Youth	2–1	Vailoatai Youth
Unknown	Source	Unknown

Kananafou Theological Seminary College Sports Field

=== Final ===
11 December 2010

Pago Youth A	6–2	Black Roses
Unknown	Source	Unknown

Kananafou Theological Seminary College Sports Field
