= Walter Klimmek =

German footballer

- Born: 14 March 1919
- Died: 13 May 2010 (aged 91)
- Occupation: Football player
Association football career
- Position: Defender
Senior career*
Years	Team	Apps	(Gls)
- Schalke 04
- * Club domestic league appearances and goals

Walter Klimmek (14 March 1919 – 13 May 2010) was a German football defender, coal miner and firefighter. He played for Schalke 04 and was West German champion and German cup winner. He was 91 and is buried in Aschheim.
