= Ines Paulke =

German singer

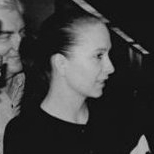
- Born: 20 September 1958; Gräfenthal, Thuringia, East Germany
- Died: 17 February 2010 (aged 51); Thannhausen, Bavaria, Germany
- Occupation: Pop singer
- Years active: 1976–2009
- Children: 2

Ines Paulke (20 September 1958 – 17 February 2010) was a German pop singer. She worked as a pop singer for the bands Motiv and Datzu before becoming a solo artist. Paulke won several prizes and was voted singer of the year for 1987. She released her CD record, Die Farbe meiner Tränen, in 1988, which saw her voted the recipient of the most successful record of the year award known as the Goldene Amiga. Paulke took up performing in cabaret, musicals and theatre after the Berlin Wall fell.

== Biography ==
On 20 September 1958, Paulke was born in Gräfenthal, Thuringia. In her childhood years she played the guitar and took piano lessons at a music school. Paulke sang in the school choir and was part of a school band. She did an apprenticeship as a nurse before going on to study classical music at the district music school in Gera, Thuringia. Following initial funding contracts, Paulke worked as a pop singer for the bands Motiv and Datzu. She earned a sponsorship agreement with the Committee for Entertainment Arts in 1983, resulting in a collaboration with Arnold Fritzsch, the music producer. Fritzsch wrote several of Paulke's songs, which were broadcast on East German radio and television.

She was the winner of several art prizes, workers' festivals, young talent festivals, and was voted singer of the year in 1987, which she won a total of three times in her career. Paulke's solo CD record, Die Farbe meiner Tränen, was released in 1988. It achieved sales of 120,000 in East Germany, and Paulke was voted the recipient of the award of most successful record of the year called the Goldene Amiga. On 7 October 1989, she performed at the International Marketplace of Festivals in Nashville, Tennessee, United States, and won the $1,000 bronze medal accolade during the Distant Accords Awards competition. She also toured China. Following the Fall of the Berlin Wall that same year which consequently resulted in the end of East Germany, Paulke became a performer in cabaret, musicals and theatre in the East of the reunified Germany.

She spent around six months working in the Personality Night Show held at the Friedrichstadt-palast during 1990 and again in 1994 and 2003. Paulke also went on a tour of Germany, worked at the Satirisches Theater der Stadt Halle in 2001, and was the performer of the song that introduced Leipzig's bid to host the 2012 Summer Olympics. She did gospel concerns during the Christmas period and a swing programme on multiple occasions during April in the Tränenpalast. Paulke was part of Reinhard Lakomy's touring Traumzauberbaum ensemble across Germany between 2005 and the conclusion of December 2009 when she left as a result of ill health.

== Personal life ==
She was a long-term relationship with the composer and pianist Peter Schenderlein from 1998 to March 2007. Paulke had two children from a previous relationship. On the night of 17 February 2010, she died by suicide by choking as a result of carbon monoxide poisoning whilst she was in her car at a lake close to Thannhausen, Bavaria, having suffered from depression in the final months of her life.

== Legacy ==
Birgit Walter of Berliner Zeitung described Paulke as a "wonderful singer with the big, bell-clear voice and the cautious stage presentation, always had something aloof, almost elitist, and always kept a little distance from the audience... She has always seen herself as a star after she was celebrated as such." The correspondent for B.Z. called her voice "voluminous".
