= Hans-Joachim Göring =

German footballer and coach (1923–2010)

Personal information
- Date of birth: 27 December 1923
- Date of death: 11 April 2010 (aged 86)
- Position: Midfielder

Senior career*
Years	Team	Apps	(Gls)
- BSG Turbine Weimar
- * Club domestic league appearances and goals

Hans-Joachim "Hansi" Göring (27 December 1923 – 11 April 2010) was an East German footballer, coach and teacher. A midfielder, he played for BSG Turbine Weimar in the DDR-Liga. After his career, he studied sports and taught for 26 years in Erfurt. He also was a skilled decorator. He was married and had three children.
