= Ken Boyes (footballer, born 1935) =

English footballer and manager

Personal information
- Full name: Kenneth Boyes
- Date of birth: 4 February 1935
- Place of birth: Scarborough, England
- Date of death: 8 August 2010 (aged 75)
- Place of death: Scarborough, England
- Height: 6 ft 0 in (1.83 m)
- Position: Defender

Senior career*
Years	Team	Apps	(Gls)
–1955	Scarborough		
1955–1966	York City	53	(2)
1966–	Scarborough		
Total		53	(2)

Managerial career
- 1974: Scarborough (caretaker)
- * Club domestic league appearances and goals

Kenneth Boyes (4 February 1935 – 8 August 2010) was an English professional footballer who played as a defender in the Football League for York City and in non-League football for Scarborough. After retiring he worked as a coach, a scout and caretaker manager for Scarborough before scouting for West Bromwich Albion and Manchester United.
