= Freck Langsam =

- DVD Cover
- Directed by: Michael Schu
- Written by: Jürgen Becker
- Starring: Dirk Bares; Jürgen Becker; Thomas Biewer; Horst Butterbach; Harry Feider; Michael Schu; Christian Zimmerman
- Edited by: Michael Schu
- Production company: MS-Film
- Distributed by: Imagion
- Release date: October 21, 2010
- Running time: 84 minutes
- Country: Germany
- Language: Trierer Platt

Freck Langsam is a German no-budget Gangster Comedy film. Written by Jürgen Becker and directed by Michael Schu, the spoken language is Trierisch, a Moselle Franconian dialect of High German from the city of Trier, where the film is set.

Freck Langsam is Trierisch for "Stirb Langsam", which is the German title of Die Hard. The plot, however, isn't based on Die Hard.

== Production ==
The concept for the movie came from Michael Schu and Jürgen Becker in 2009. Originally planned to be a 10-minute short film, the project was able to be completed through the support of local businesses. With more than 70 actors working on the film without recognition, it was in production for a year and a half and took more than 400 hours to film. Many of the main actors were firefighters at the time.

== Release ==
The first trailer was released on YouTube in April 2010 and the premier was viewed by an audience of 1200 at the Europahalle theater in Trier. The film opened on 21 October 2010 at the Broadway Theater (also in Trier), becoming 7000 viewers in the first three weeks. At the time, no film in the five years preceding had sold more tickets at that theater, to include Harry Potter (film series). With an initial shipment of 5,000, the DVD was released on 9 December 2010 and by the end of January 2011 had sold 16,000 of the total 23,000 produced.

== Plot ==
The Trier Mob Boss develops a plan to steal the Holy Robes from the Trier Dom, and sell it off to the highest bidder from the international mafia. A dopey detective and his corrupt boss try to stop it. It comes to a showdown in a rock quarry.
