= Norman Christie (footballer, born 1925) =

Scottish footballer and manager (1925–2010)

Personal information
- Date of birth: 1 September 1925
- Place of birth: Kilmuir, Scotland
- Date of death: 6 October 2010 (aged 85)
- Place of death: Forfar, Angus, Scotland
- Position: Centre half

Youth career
- RAF Invergordon

Senior career*
Years	Team	Apps	(Gls)
1947–1950	Third Lanark	30	(1)
1951–1952	Ayr United	3	(0)
1952–1954	Stirling Albion	32	(0)
1954–1957	Brechin City	60	(0)
1957–1959	Montrose	46	(0)
Total		171	(1)

Managerial career
- 1959–1968: Montrose
- * Club domestic league appearances and goals

Norman Christie (1 September 1925 – 6 October 2010) was a Scottish football player and manager. He played for Third Lanark, Stirling Albion, Ayr United, Brechin City and Montrose. Christie retired in 1959 and was then soon appointed manager of Montrose, a position he held for ten years.

== Honours ==
Montrose

- Forfarshire Cup : 1960–61
