= Manfred Kallenbach =

East German footballer

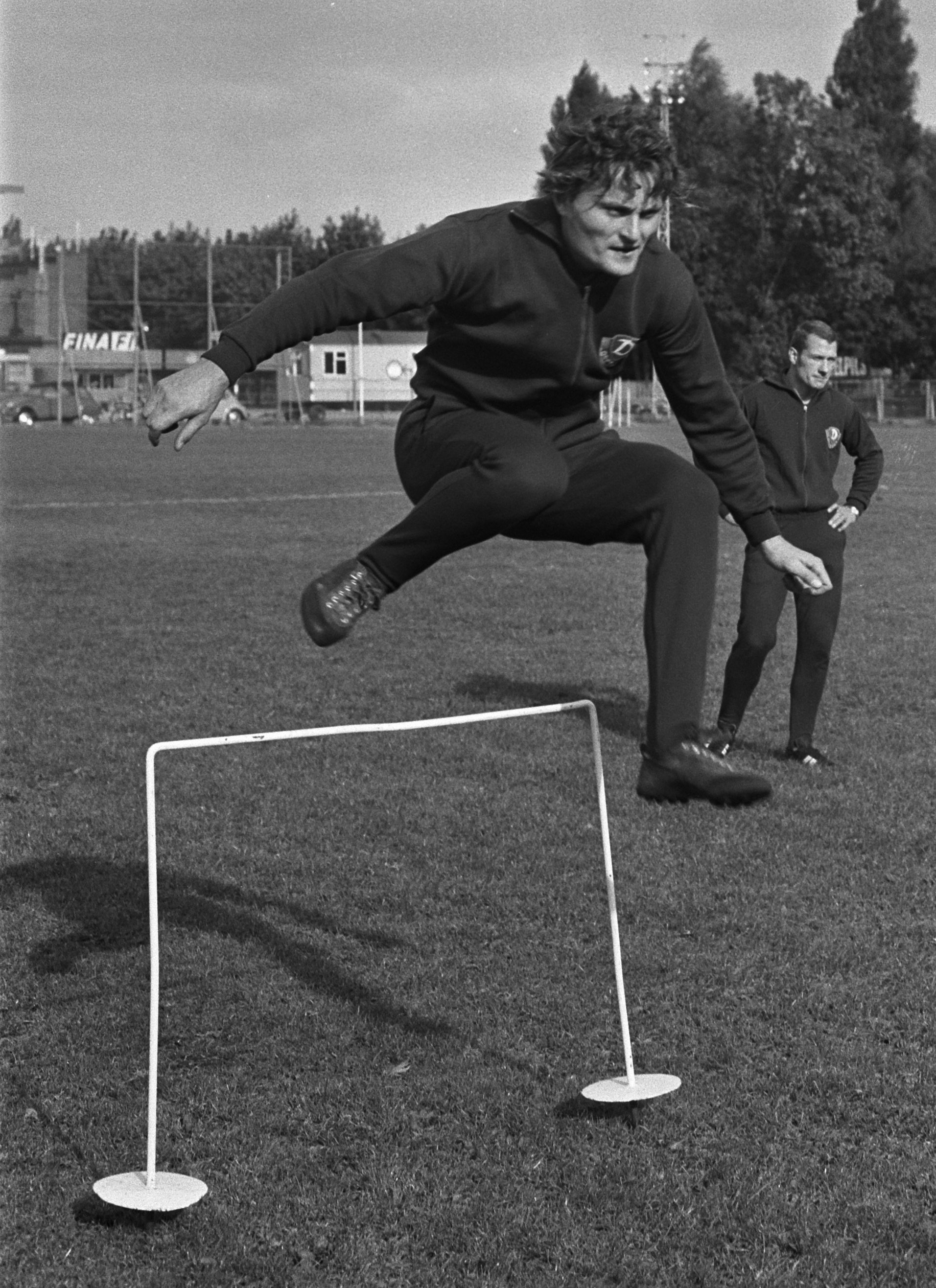
- Kallenbach training in Amsterdam, 1971

Personal information
- Date of birth: 8 April 1942
- Place of birth: Dresden, Germany
- Date of death: 21 April 2010 (aged 68)
- Place of death: Dresden, Germany
- Position: Goalkeeper

Senior career*
Years	Team	Apps	(Gls)
- SG Dynamo Dresden
- BSG Stahl Riesa
- * Club domestic league appearances and goals

Manfred Kallenbach (8 April 1942 in Dresden – 21 April 2010 in Dresden) was a German goalkeeper and East German Champion. He played for SG Dynamo Dresden and BSG Stahl Riesa.

== Literature ==
- Hanns Leske: Enzyklopädie des DDR-Fußballs. Die Werkstatt, Göttingen 2007, ISBN 978-3-89533-556-3
- Andreas Baingo, Michael Horn: Geschichte der DDR-Oberliga. Göttingen 2007, ISBN 978-3-89533-428-3
- Uwe Nuttelmann: DDR-Oberliga. Eigenverlag 2007, ISBN 3-930814-33-1
