= Deaths in June 2010 =

The following is a list of notable deaths in June 2010.

Entries for each day are listed alphabetically by surname. A typical entry lists information in the following sequence:

- Name, age, country of citizenship at birth, subsequent country of citizenship (if applicable), reason for notability, cause of death (if known), and reference.

== June 2010 ==
=== 1 ===
- Omar Andréen, 87, Norwegian painter, graphic artist, and illustrator.
- Freddie Burdette, 73, American baseball player (Chicago Cubs).
- Vladimír Bystrov, 74, Czech writer and translator, recipient of the Order of Tomáš Garrigue Masaryk.
- Chinook Pass, 31, American Thoroughbred racehorse, euthanized.
- Arturo Falaschi, 77, Italian geneticist.
- John Hagart, 72, Scottish football player and manager.
- Heather the Leather, 50, British scaleless carp, old age.
- Arthur A. Link, 96, American politician. U.S. Representative (1971–1973), Governor of North Dakota (1973–1981).
- Roger Manderscheid, 77, Luxembourgish author.
- Miss Ellie, 17, American Chinese Crested Dog, winner of title World's Ugliest Dog.
- Kazuo Ohno, 103, Japanese dancer, respiratory failure.
- Frank Pike, 80, Canadian football player and manager, heart failure.
- Joseph Strick, 86, American film director and producer, heart failure.
- Lobi Traoré, 48, Malian musician.
- Andrei Voznesensky, 77, Russian poet and writer.

=== 2 ===
- Dick Bird, 77, British Anglican priest.
- Eleanor Taylor Bland, 65, American crime fiction writer.
- Floribert Chebeya, 46, Congolese human rights activist.
- Dorothy DeBorba, 85, American actress (Our Gang), emphysema and lung disease.
- Tony DiPreta, 88, American cartoonist, (Joe Palooka, Rex Morgan, M.D.), respiratory and cardiac arrest.
- John W. Douglas, 88, American civil rights advocate, complications from a stroke.
- Joe Gardi, 71, American football coach, stroke.
- Kovilan, 86, Indian novelist, respiratory disease.
- Marguerite Narbel, 92, Swiss biologist and politician, member of the Grand Council of Vaud.
- Garry Purdham, 31, English rugby league player (Workington Town), shot.
- Ri Je-gang, 80, North Korean politician, First Deputy Head of the Organization and Guidance Department of the Workers' Party of Korea, car accident.
- John Richardson, 77, Canadian politician, MP for Perth—Wellington—Waterloo (1993–1997); Perth—Middlesex (1997–2002), Alzheimer's disease.
- António Alva Rosa Coutinho, 84, Portuguese admiral and politician, Governor-General of Angola, after long illness.
- Michael Schildberger, 72, Australian journalist, prostate cancer.
- Gabriele Sella, 47, Italian Olympic cyclist.
- Giuseppe Taddei, 93, Italian opera singer.
- Yoo Chang-soon, 92, South Korean politician, Prime Minister (1982).

=== 3 ===
- João Aguiar, 66, Portuguese writer and journalist.
- Vladimir Arnold, 72, Russian mathematician, peritonitis.
- Frank Bernasko, 79, Ghanaian soldier and politician.
- Bill Clark, 80, New Zealand rugby player, after long illness.
- Frank Evans, 86, American politician, member of the U.S. House of Representatives from Colorado (1965–1979).
- John Hedgecoe, 78, British photographer.
- Robert Hudson, 90, British broadcaster.
- K. M. M. B. Kulatunga, Sri Lankan puisne justice of the Supreme Court
- Paul Malliavin, 84, French mathematician, creator of Malliavin calculus.
- Rue McClanahan, 76, American actress (The Golden Girls, Maude, Starship Troopers), Emmy winner (1987), stroke.
- Luigi Padovese, 63, Italian Roman Catholic prelate, Vicar of Anatolia and chairman of the Turkish Bishops' Conference (since 2004), stabbed.
- Pance Pondaag, 59, Indonesian pop singer and songwriter, complications from a stroke.
- Pétur Sigurgeirsson, 91, Icelandic prelate, Bishop of Iceland (1981–1989).
- Emory C. Swank, 88, American diplomat, Ambassador to Cambodia (1970–1973).
- Hasan Tiro, 84, Indonesian politician, founder of the Free Aceh Movement, multiple organ dysfunction syndrome.
- Leonard S. Unger, 92, American diplomat, Ambassador to Laos (1962–1964), Thailand (1967), and the Republic of China (1974–1979).
- Charlie Wedemeyer, 64, American football player and coach, complications from amyotrophic lateral sclerosis.

=== 4 ===
- Raymond Allchin, 86, British archaeologist.
- Bill Ashenfelter, 85, American Olympic athlete.
- Frank Ballard, 80, American puppeteer and educator, complications from Parkinson's disease.
- Himan Brown, 99, American radio producer (CBS Radio Mystery Theater).
- Jim Copeland, 65, American football player, cancer.
- Marianne Elser Crowder, 104, American oldest Girl Scout, pancreatic cancer.
- Amado Crowley, 80, British occult writer and magician. (Death announced by this date)
- Richard Dunn, 73, American character actor (Tim and Eric Awesome Show, Great Job!), stroke.
- David Foster, 90, British naval pilot.
- Jack Harrison, 97, British air force officer, last survivor of Stalag Luft III.
- Richard P. Lindsay, 84, American Mormon leader and politician (Utah House of Representatives, 1972–1977), cancer.
- Syd Luyt, 84, South African Olympic runner.
- David Markson, 82, American writer (Wittgenstein's Mistress).
- William Miranda Marín, 69, Puerto Rican politician, mayor of Caguas (1997–2010), pancreatic cancer.
- Andi Meriem Matalatta, 52, Indonesian pop singer, complications from diabetes.
- Carlos Francisco Martins Pinheiro, 85, Portuguese Roman Catholic prelate.
- Hennadiy Popovych, 37, Ukrainian footballer (Zenit, Shakhtar), cardiac arrest.
- Norman Rothfield, 98, Australian peace and labour activist.
- Ray Smith, 80, Australian Olympic athlete.
- Chuck Taliano, 65, American marine, featured on recruitment poster, multiple myeloma.
- Eddie Washington, 56, American politician, member of the Illinois House of Representatives (2003–2010), heart attack.
- John Werket, 85, American Olympic speed skater.
- John Wooden, 99, American basketball coach (UCLA, 1948–1975).

=== 5 ===
- Esma Agolli, 81, Albanian actress, cardiac arrest.
- Braulio Alonso, 93, American educator.
- Sir Neil Anderson, 83, New Zealand admiral, Chief of Defence Staff (1980–1983).
- Danny Bank, 87, American jazz saxophonist, clarinetist, and flautist.
- Robert C. Bergenheim, 86, American founder of Boston Business Journal.
- Angus Douglas-Hamilton, 15th Duke of Hamilton, 71, British peer and racing driver, dementia.
- Robert Healy, 84, American journalist, executive editor (The Boston Globe), stroke.
- Stephen Clancy Hill, 34, American pornographic actor and murderer, suicide by jumping.
- Jacob Milgrom, 87, American rabbi and biblical scholar, brain hemorrhage.
- Finian Monahan, 86, Irish Roman Catholic friar and priest, Superior General (1973–1979), pneumonia.
- Arne Nordheim, 78, Norwegian contemporary classical composer.
- Tony Peluso, 60, American musician and record producer (The Carpenters), heart disease.
- Steven Reuther, 58, American film producer (Dirty Dancing, Pretty Woman, The Ugly Truth), cancer.
- Robert Wussler, 73, American businessman, co-founder of CNN, after long illness.

=== 6 ===
- Mabi de Almeida, 46, Angolan football manager, after long illness.
- Jack Beeson, 88, American contemporary classical music composer, heart failure.
- Marvin Isley, 56, American bassist (The Isley Brothers, Isley-Jasper-Isley), complications of diabetes.
- Dana Key, 56, American musician (DeGarmo and Key), ruptured blood clot.
- Abraham Nathanson, 80, American graphic designer and author, co-inventor of Bananagrams, cancer.
- Robert B. Radnitz, 85, American film producer (Cross Creek, My Side of the Mountain, Sounder), complications from a stroke.
- Ladislav Smoljak, 78, Czech film and theatre director, after long illness.
- Jerry Stephenson, 66, American baseball player (Boston Red Sox), lung cancer.
- Paul Wunderlich, 83, German artist.

=== 7 ===
- José Albi, 88, Spanish poet.
- Paul Bell, 59, American politician, member of the Iowa House of Representatives (since 1993), stomach cancer.
- Stuart Cable, 40, Welsh drummer (Stereophonics), accidental asphyxiation.
- Chai Zemin, 93, Chinese diplomat.
- Mordechai Eliyahu, 81, Israeli rabbi, Sephardi Chief Rabbi of Israel (1983–1993).
- Jorge Ginarte, 70, Argentine football manager.
- Ndoc Gjetja, 66, Albanian poet, after long illness.
- Alex Hastie, 74, British rugby player.
- Eric Mason, 83, British actor (Hot Fuzz, A Man for All Seasons, Doctor Who).
- Arsen Naydyonov, 68, Russian football coach (Zhemchuzhina, Novorossiysk).
- Oliver N'Goma, 51, Gabonese singer and guitarist, renal failure.
- Omar Rayo, 82, Colombian painter and sculptor, heart attack.
- Viana Júnior, 68, Brazilian comedian, multiple organ dysfunction syndrome.
- Adriana Xenides, 54, Argentine-born Australian television personality (Wheel of Fortune), ruptured intestine.

=== 8 ===
- Tony Cennamo, 76, American disc jockey (WBUR), after long illness.
- Margaret Delacourt-Smith, Baroness Delacourt-Smith of Alteryn, 94, British politician and life peer.
- Dan Eastman, 64, American politician and businessman, Utah State Senator (2000–2008), heart failure.
- Joan Hinton, 88, American nuclear physicist, abdominal aneurysm.
- Porfi Jiménez, 82, Dominican-born Venezuelan musician, arranger, composer and bandleader.
- Plamen Maslarov, 60, Bulgarian film director.
- Stephen Rivers, 55, American publicist and political activist, prostate cancer.
- Ismael Blas Rolón Silvero, 96, Paraguayan Roman Catholic prelate, Archbishop of Asunción (1970–1989).
- Crispian St. Peters, 71, British pop singer ("The Pied Piper", "You Were on My Mind"), after long illness.
- Andreas Voutsinas, 79, Greek actor and stage director.

=== 9 ===
- Epaminondas José de Araújo, 88, Brazilian Roman Catholic prelate, Bishop of Palmeira dos Índios (1978–1984).
- Ken Brown, 70, British guitarist (The Quarrymen).
- Fadzil Mahmood, 73, Malaysian politician, speaker of the Perlis State Assembly (1986–1990).
- Melbert Ford, 49, American convicted murderer, execution by lethal injection.
- Christine Johnson, 98, American opera singer and actress.
- Bobby Kromm, 82, Canadian ice hockey coach (Detroit Red Wings, Winnipeg Jets), complications from colorectal cancer.
- Joseph Crescent McKinney, 81, American Roman Catholic auxiliary bishop of Grand Rapids (1968–2001).
- Marina Semyonova, 101, Russian prima ballerina (Bolshoi Ballet).
- Mohamed Sylla, 39, Guinean footballer (Willem II, Martigues, Guinea), cancer.
- Oleksandr Zinchenko, 53, Ukrainian politician.

=== 10 ===
- David Ellison, 70, British actor (Juliet Bravo).
- Ginette Garcin, 82, French actress, cancer.
- Ferdinand Oyono, 80, Cameroonian writer and government minister, Minister of Foreign Affairs (1992–1997).
- Sigmar Polke, 69, German painter and photographer, cancer.
- Basil Schott, 70, American Byzantine Catholic friar, Metropolitan of the Byzantine Catholic Archeparchy of Pittsburgh (since 2002), cancer.

=== 11 ===
- Bernie Andrews, 76, British radio producer.
- Maria Aurora, 72, Portuguese journalist, poet, novelist, children's writer and television presenter.
- Henri Cuq, 68, French politician.
- Shunsuke Ikeda, 68, Japanese actor (Kikaider 01, Ultraman Mebius & Ultraman Brothers), stomach cancer.
- Kip Deville, 7, American Thoroughbred racehorse, euthanized.
- Teresa Jungman, 102, English socialite.
- Norman Macrae, 86, British journalist, deputy editor of The Economist (1965–1988).
- William J. Mitchell, 65, American architect and urban designer (MIT Media Lab), complications of cancer.
- Johnny Parker, 80, British jazz pianist ("Bad Penny Blues").
- Andrzej Piątkowski, 75, Polish sabreur, Olympic medallist (1956, 1960 and 1964).
- Fred Plum, 86, American neurologist, developed the term "persistent vegetative state", primary progressive aphasia.
- Badal Rahman, 61, Bangladeshi film director and political activist.
- Dariusz Ratajczak, 47, Polish holocaust denier (body discovered on this date).
- Bus Whitehead, 82, American basketball player (Nebraska Cornhuskers)
- James N. Wood, 69, American museum director.

=== 12 ===
- Anne Chapman, 88, French-born American ethnologist.
- John Crampton, 88, British RAF pilot.
- Daisy D'ora, 97, German actress and socialite.
- Tadeusz Hogendorf, 91, Polish footballer.
- Richard Keynes, 90, British physiologist.
- Ko Tun-hwa, 89, Taiwanese vice admiral and politician.
- Rik Levins, 60, American comic book artist (Captain America, The Avengers).
- Chuck Lyda, 57, American slalom and sprint canoer, stomach cancer.
- Félix Maldonado, 72, American baseball player and scout (Boston Red Sox), cancer.
- Fuat Mansurov, 82, Kazakh-born Russian conductor (Bolshoi Theatre).
- Les Richter, 79, American football player (Los Angeles Rams), member of Pro Football Hall of Fame, and auto racing official, NASCAR head of operations, brain aneurysm.
- Egon Ronay, 94, Hungarian-born British restaurateur and restaurant critic.
- Philip Selznick, 91, American lawyer, author and sociologist.
- Grizzly Smith, 77, American professional wrestler, Alzheimer's disease.
- Jerzy Stefan Stawiński, 88, Polish screenwriter and film director.
- Al Williamson, 79, American comic book artist (Secret Agent X-9, Superman, Flash Gordon).

=== 13 ===
- Combo Ayouba, 57-58, Comorian army officer, Coordinator of the Transitional Military Committee (1995), shot.
- E. F. Bleiler, 90, American science fiction author.
- Thomas S. Buechner, 83, American museum director, lymphoma.
- Dave Broda, 65, Canadian politician, member of the Legislative Assembly of Alberta (1997–2004), car crash.
- Jimmy Dean, 81, American country music singer (Big Bad John), actor and businessman (Jimmy Dean Foods), natural causes.
- Abbas Djoussouf, 68, Comorian politician, Prime Minister (1998–1999).
- Ernest Fleischmann, 85, German-born American impresario, executive director of the Los Angeles Philharmonic.
- Ernie Johnson, 84, American football and basketball player (UCLA).
- Emilio Macias, 76, Filipino politician, Governor of Negros Oriental, liver cancer.
- F. James McDonald, 87, American businessman, President of General Motors (1981–1987).
- Tom Stith, 71, American basketball player (New York Knicks).
- Sergei Tretyakov, 53, Russian intelligence officer and defector, former SVR agent.
- Nelson Wallulatum, 84, American Wasco tribe leader, chief of the Wasco Indians (since 1959), founder of The Museum at Warm Springs.
- Jonathan Wolken, 60, American artistic director, co-founder of Pilobolus, complications from stem cell transplant.

=== 14 ===
- Oscar Azócar, 45, Venezuelan baseball player (New York Yankees, San Diego Padres).
- Teshome Gabriel, 70, Ethiopian-born American cinema scholar, cardiac arrest.
- Resi Hammerer, 85, Austrian Olympic alpine skier, bronze medalist (1948 Winter Olympics).
- Richard Herrmann, 90, Norwegian journalist, writer and radio personality (NRK), after long illness.
- Jiří Kavan, 66, Czech Olympic silver medal-winning (1972) handball player.
- Leonid Kizim, 68, Ukrainian Soviet cosmonaut.
- Ted Lowry, 90, American boxer, heart failure.
- Manohar Malgonkar, 96, Indian author.
- Luis Arturo Mondragón, 53, Honduran journalist, shot.
- Giacinto Prandelli, 96, Italian operatic tenor.
- Damian Silvera, 35, American Olympic soccer player.
- Jaroslav Škarvada, 85, Czech Roman Catholic prelate, auxiliary bishop of Prague (1982–2002).

=== 15 ===
- Thomas L. Ashley, 87, American politician, U.S. Representative for Ohio (1955–1981).
- Charles Thomas Beer, 94, Canadian chemist.
- Brian Bethell, 45, American spree killer.
- Bekim Fehmiu, 74, Serbian actor (I Even Met Happy Gypsies), suspected suicide by gunshot.
- Phil Gordon, 94, American character actor and dialect coach (The Beverly Hillbillies, Green Acres, Petticoat Junction).
- Charlie Hickcox, 63, American Olympic swimmer, gold and silver medalist (1968 Summer Olympics), cancer.
- Heidi Kabel, 95, German stage actress.
- Tadashi Kawashima, 41, Japanese manga artist (Alive: The Final Evolution), liver cancer.
- Arnold Kramish, 87, American physicist, neurological disorder.
- Wendell Logan, 69, American composer.
- Busi Mhlongo, 62, South African musician, cancer.
- Natalia Tolstaya, 67, Russian writer and translator.

=== 16 ===
- Joselito Agustin, 37, Filipino journalist, shot.
- Marc Bazin, 78, Haitian politician, Acting President and Prime Minister (1992–1993).
- Peter Brunette, 66, American film critic (The Hollywood Reporter), heart attack.
- Bill Dixon, 84, American jazz musician.
- Maureen Forrester, 79, Canadian opera singer, complications of Alzheimer's disease.
- Amedeo Guillet, 101, Italian army officer.
- Bob Hartman, 72, American baseball player, post-surgical infection.
- Allen Hoey, 57, American poet, Pulitzer Prize nominee, heart attack.
- Ronald Neame, 99, British film director (The Poseidon Adventure) and screenwriter.
- Jim Nestor, 90, Australian Olympic cyclist.
- Corso Salani, 48, Italian actor and film director, stroke.
- Garry Shider, 56, American musician (Parliament-Funkadelic), complications from brain and lung cancer.
- P. G. Viswambharan, 63, Indian film director, after long illness.

=== 17 ===
- Hannah Atkins, 86, American politician, Secretary of State of Oklahoma (1987–1991) and State Representative (1969–1981), cancer.
- Elżbieta Czyżewska, 72, Polish-born American actress, esophageal cancer.
- Hans Dichand, 89, Austrian journalist and newspaper publisher.
- Sebastian Horsley, 47, British artist, heroin overdose.
- Anjali Mendes, 64, Indian model.
- K. S. Rajah, 80, Singaporean juridical official, Judicial Commissioner of the Supreme Court, cancer.
- Andy Ripley, 62, British rugby player, prostate cancer.

=== 18 ===
- Trent Acid, 29, American professional wrestler, accidental drug overdose.
- Marcel Bigeard, 94, French general and politician.
- Bogdan Bogdanović, 87, Serbian architect, urbanist, and politician, Mayor of Belgrade (1982–1986), heart attack.
- Waldemar Ciesielczyk, 51, Polish Olympic fencer.
- Joe Deal, 62, American photographer, bladder cancer.
- Bidya Debbarma, 94, Indian politician.
- Robert Galambos, 96, American neuroscientist, discovered how bats navigate, heart failure.
- Ronnie Lee Gardner, 49, American convicted murderer, executed by firing squad.
- Tom Nicon, 22, French model, suicide by jumping.
- Kalmen Opperman, 90, American clarinetist, heart failure.
- José Saramago, 87, Portuguese novelist, playwright and journalist, Nobel Prize winner for literature, cancer.
- Hans Joachim Sewering, 94, German physician, member of the Waffen-SS (1933–1945).
- Hadelin Viellevoye, 95, Belgian footballer

=== 19 ===
- Manute Bol, 47, Sudanese basketball player and activist, kidney failure and Stevens–Johnson syndrome.
- Anwar Chowdhry, 86, Pakistani sports official, President of the International Boxing Association (1986–2006), heart attack.
- Jack Cloud, 85, American football player.
- Ned Endress, 92, American basketball player.
- Marvin L. Esch, 82, American politician, U.S. Representative from Michigan (1967–1977).
- John Ferruggio, 84, American in-flight director, led evacuation of Pan Am Flight 93, organ failure.
- Mohammed Ali Hammadi, 46, Lebanese militant (Hezbollah), drone strike.
- Robin Matthews, 83, British economist and chess problemist.
- Carlos Monsiváis, 72, Mexican writer and journalist, respiratory failure.
- Vince O'Brien, 91, American character actor (Dark Shadows, Guiding Light, Law & Order).
- Alfred Parsons, 85, Australian diplomat, High Commissioner to the United Kingdom (1983–1987).
- Anthony Quinton, Baron Quinton, 85, British philosopher and life peer.
- Jesús Manuel Lara Rodríguez, 48, Mexican politician, mayor of Guadalupe, Chihuahua, shot.
- Dame Angela Rumbold, 77, British politician, MP for Mitcham and Morden (1982–1997).
- Nico Smith, 81, South African minister and anti-apartheid activist, heart attack.
- Ken Talbot, 59, Australian businessman, CEO of Macarthur Coal (1995–2008), plane crash.
- Paul Thiebaud, 49, American gallerist, colon cancer.
- Ursula Thiess, 86, German artist and actress (Bengal Brigade).
- Jack Tobin, 90, American anthropologist, expert on the Marshall Islands.
- Chris Welles, 72, American business journalist, Alzheimer's disease.

=== 20 ===
- Dwight Armstrong, 58, American anti-Vietnam War protester, Sterling Hall bomber, lung cancer.
- Sir William Boulton, 3rd Baronet, 98, British barrister.
- Vladimír Dlouhý, 52, Czech actor.
- Lai Sun Cheung, 59, Hong Kong football coach, lung cancer.
- Raymond Parks, 96, American auto racer, two-time NASCAR car owner points champion.
- Abdolmalek Rigi, 27, Iranian Sunni Islamist militant, leader of Jundallah, execution by hanging.
- Roberto Rosato, 66, Italian footballer.
- Gundibail Sunderam, 80, Indian cricketer, after a short illness.
- Albert Webster, 85, British Olympic athlete.
- Harry B. Whittington, 94, British palaeontologist.

=== 21 ===
- Jesús Álvarez Amaya, 84, Mexican painter and graphic artist, cancer.
- Russell Ash, 64, British writer and publisher (The Top 10 of Everything).
- Irwin Barker, 58, Canadian comedian and television writer (This Hour Has 22 Minutes, Rick Mercer Report), leiomyosarcoma.
- Wilfried Feldenkirchen, 62, German economic historian and project manager (Siemens), car crash.
- Rosemary Gillespie, 69, Australian human rights activist and lawyer, stroke.
- Bob Greene, 92, American Makah tribe elder, natural causes.
- Hector Laing, Baron Laing of Dunphail, 87, British businessman and life peer.
- Allison Parks, 68, American model (Playboy, October 1965) and actress.
- Ingeborg Pertmayr, 63, Austrian Olympic diver.
- Henrique Walter Pinotti, 81, Brazilian physician, cancer.
- William S. Richardson, 90, American jurist and politician, Lieutenant Governor of Hawaii (1962–1966), Chief Justice (Hawaii Supreme Court, 1966–1982).
- Hermann Gonçalves Schatzmayr, 75, Brazilian virologist, Fundação Oswaldo Cruz researcher, multiple organ dysfunction syndrome.
- İlhan Selçuk, 85, Turkish lawyer, journalist and writer, editor-in-chief of Cumhuriyet, multiple organ dysfunction syndrome.
- Chris Sievey, 54, British comedian and musician (Frank Sidebottom), lung cancer.
- Tam White, 67, British musician and actor, heart attack.
- With Approval, 24, Canadian Thoroughbred racehorse, Canadian Triple Crown winner (1989), euthanized.
- Larry Jon Wilson, 69, American songwriter and musician, stroke.

=== 22 ===
- Pamela Ascherson, 87, British sculptor, painter and illustrator.
- Peppy Blount, 85, American football player (Texas Longhorns) and line judge.
- Robin Bush, 67, British historian (Time Team).
- Gerald Heaney, 92, American jurist, United States Court of Appeals (1966–2006).
- Marie-Luise Jahn, 92, German activist, member of the anti-Nazi resistance movement White Rose.
- Aileen Osofsky, 83, American community leader, philanthropist and bridge player (ACBL), complications from leukemia.
- Amokrane Oualiken, 77, Algerian footballer.
- Pennant Roberts, 69, British television director.
- Manfred Römbell, 68, German writer, after long illness.
- Wayne Stephenson, 65, Canadian professional and Olympic bronze medal-winning (1968) ice hockey player.
- Levern Tart, 68, American basketball player (Oakland Oaks, New York Nets).
- Tracy Wright, 50, Canadian actress, pancreatic cancer.

=== 23 ===
- Anthony Adrian Allen, 96, British entomologist.
- Ron Atchison, 80, Canadian football player (Saskatchewan Roughriders), heart failure.
- Jörg Berger, 65, German football manager, bowel cancer.
- John Burton, 95, Australian diplomat and academic.
- Michael Cobb, 93, British Army officer and railway historian.
- Dermot Earley, 62, Irish Chief of Staff of the Defence Forces (2004–2010), after short illness.
- Allyn Ferguson, 85, American television composer (Barney Miller, Charlie's Angels), natural causes.
- Frank Giering, 38, German actor (Funny Games).
- Pavel Lyubimov, 71, Russian film director.
- Vernon Mendis, 84, Sri Lankan diplomat.
- Mohammed Mzali, 84, Tunisian politician, Prime Minister (1980–1986).
- Hiromu Naruse, 66, Japanese chief test driver for Toyota Motor Company, car crash.
- Pete Quaife, 66, British bassist (The Kinks), kidney failure.
- Peter Walker, Baron Walker of Worcester, 78, British politician and life peer, MP for Worcester (1961–1992), cancer.

=== 24 ===
- Toni Adams, 45, American professional wrestling manager, former wife of Chris Adams, heart attack.
- Sadri Ahmeti, 71, Albanian painter and poet.
- Fred Anderson, 81, American jazz tenor saxophonist.
- Rawshan Ara, 69, Bangladeshi film actress.
- Armand Bernard, 82, Canadian Olympic wrestler.
- JoJo Billingsley, 58, American back-up singer (Lynyrd Skynyrd), cancer.
- Elise M. Boulding, 89, American sociologist, liver failure.
- Lorn Brown, 71, American sports commentator (Chicago White Sox), heart failure.
- Shirley Carr, 81, Canadian president of the Labour Congress.
- Cherubim Dambui, 62, Papua New Guinean Premier of East Sepik (1976–1983), auxiliary bishop of Port Moresby (since 2000), kidney failure.
- Digvijay Singh, 54, Indian politician.
- Francis Dreyfus, 70, French record producer (Disques Dreyfus).
- Harry Enns, 78, Canadian politician, MLA for Rockwood-Iberville/Lakeside (1966–2003).
- Don Enoch, 94, American politician, Mayor of Wichita, Kansas (1969–1970).
- Bill Hudson, 77, American photojournalist, heart failure.
- Alan Krueck, 70, American musicologist.
- Kazimierz Paździor, 75, Polish Olympic gold medal-winning (1960) boxer.
- Jean-Léonard Rugambage, Rwandan journalist, shot.
- Walter Shorenstein, 95, American real estate developer and baseball team owner (San Francisco Giants), natural causes.
- Ben Sonnenberg, 73, American journalist, multiple sclerosis.
- Jean-Luc Tricoire, 57, French Olympic sports shooter.
- Daniel Williams, 77, American archivist and historian.

=== 25 ===
- Viveka Babajee, 37, Mauritian-born Indian model and actress, suicide by hanging.
- Brian Flowers, Baron Flowers, 85, British physicist, academic and life peer.
- F. Gwynplaine MacIntyre, 62, Welsh science fiction author, suicide by self-immolation.
- Robert Nyman, 49, American politician, member of the Massachusetts House of Representatives (since 1999), drowning.
- Alan Plater, 75, English television writer, cancer.
- Richard B. Sellars, 94, American Chairman and CEO of Johnson & Johnson.
- Peter Sliker, 86, American bass-baritone at the Metropolitan Opera
- John A. Willis, 93, American editor of Theatre World.
- Wu Guanzhong, 90, Chinese painter.

=== 26 ===
- Algirdas Brazauskas, 77, Lithuanian politician, President (1993–1998); Prime Minister (2001–2006), lymphoma.
- D. Page Elmore, 71, American politician, member of the Maryland House of Delegates (2003–2010), cancer.
- Aldo Giuffrè, 86, Italian actor, peritonitis.
- Alberto Guzik, 66, Brazilian actor and writer, stomach cancer.
- Paulo Teixeira Jorge, 82, Angolan politician, Minister of External Relations (1976–1984).
- Charles Spencer King, 85, English automotive engineer (Rover SD1, Range Rover), complications following a traffic accident.
- Harald Keres, 97, Estonian physicist.
- Shoista Mullojonova, 84, Tajik singer, heart attack.
- Akira Nakamura, 76, Japanese historian.
- Adoor Pankajam, 81, Indian actress.
- Conrad Poe, 62, Filipino actor, stroke.
- Benny Powell, 80, American jazz trombonist (April in Paris), heart attack following spinal surgery.
- Jonathan Smith, 43, British games developer.
- D. Sudarsanam, 68, Indian politician, multiple organ dysfunction syndrome.
- Sergio Vega, 40, Mexican banda singer, shot.
- Stanley Wagner, 83, American winemaker.
- Sir John Ward, 85, British politician, MP for Poole (1979–1997).
- Vasyl Yevseyev, 47, Ukrainian football coach, suicide by jumping.

=== 27 ===
- Corey Allen, 75, American actor (Rebel Without a Cause), film and television director, complications of Parkinson's disease.
- Leif Alsheimer, 57, Swedish lawyer, lecturer and author.
- Dolph Briscoe, 87, American politician, Governor of Texas (1973–1979), kidney failure and pneumonia.
- Ken Coates, 79, British politician and writer, suspected heart attack.
- Édgar García de Dios, 32, Mexican footballer, shot.
- João Gonçalves Filho, 75, Brazilian Olympic swimmer and water polo player.
- Martin D. Ginsburg, 78, American attorney, husband of Ruth Bader Ginsburg, cancer.
- Edo Mulahalilović, 46, Bosnian musician.
- Andreas Okopenko, 80, Austrian writer.

=== 28 ===
- Claude Anderson, 86, Australian footballer.
- Bill Aucoin, 66, American band manager (Kiss), complications from prostate cancer.
- Leo Bernier, 81, Canadian politician.
- Peter Bowers, 80, Australian journalist, Alzheimer's disease.
- Robert Byrd, 92, American politician, U.S. Representative (1953–1959), Senator from West Virginia (since 1959), and President pro tempore (since 2007).
- Clement Finch, 94, American hematologist.
- Nicolas Hayek, 82, Swiss entrepreneur, founder and chairman of The Swatch Group, heart failure.
- Kirsten Heisig, 48, German politician and juvenile magistrate, suicide.
- Willie Huber, 52, German-born Canadian ice hockey player (Detroit Red Wings), heart attack.
- Chandrakant Kamat, 76, Indian Hindustani classical tabla player, heart attack.
- Louis Moyroud, 96, French-born American inventor of phototypesetting.
- Rammellzee, 49, American hip hop musician and graffiti artist, after long illness.
- Joya Sherrill, 85, American jazz vocalist, leukemia.
- William L. Taylor, 78, American attorney and civil rights advocate, complications from a fall.
- Rodolfo Torre Cantú, 46, Mexican politician, candidate for Governor of Tamaulipas, shot.

=== 29 ===
- Blair Barnes, 49, Canadian ice hockey player (Los Angeles Kings), heart attack.
- Ron Gans, 79, American voice actor (Transformers, Welcome to Pooh Corner, Dumbo's Circus), complications from pneumonia.
- Rudolf Leopold, 85, Austrian art collector.
- Doug Ohlson, 73, American painter, complications from a fall.
- Queen Jane, 45, Kenyan musician, meningitis.
- Chandgi Ram, 72, Indian Olympic wrestler, cardiac arrest.
- Frank Rigney, 74, American-born Canadian football player (Winnipeg Blue Bombers).
- Pietro Taricone, 35, Italian actor and reality show contestant (Grande Fratello), parachute accident.

=== 30 ===
- Brian Ash, 73-74, British writer, scientific journalist, and editor.
- Bruno Côté, 69, Canadian landscape painter, prostate cancer.
- Elliott Kastner, 80, American film producer (Where Eagles Dare), cancer.
- Harry Klein, 81, British jazz saxophonist.
- Juhani Kyöstilä, 78, Finnish Olympic basketball player.
- Noel Marshall, 79, American film director and producer.
- Serigne Mouhamadou Lamine Bara Mbacké, 85, Senegalese Grand Marabout of the Mourides.
- Denny Moyer, 70, American world light middleweight champion boxer.
- Gordon Mulholland, 89, British actor.
- Park Yong-ha, 32, South Korean actor and singer, suicide by hanging.
