= Daniel Williams =

Daniel or Dan Williams may refer to:

== Sports ==
- Daniel Williams (cricketer) (born 1981), English cricketer
- Daniel Williams (judoka) (born 1989), British judoka
- Daniel Williams (footballer, born 2001), Welsh footballer
- Dan Williams (defensive end) (born 1969), American football defensive end
- Dan Williams III (born 1995), American football wide receiver
- Dan Williams (defensive tackle) (born 1987), American football defensive tackle
- Dan Williams (rugby union) (born 1989), English rugby union player
- Daniel Williams (runner) (born 2007), Australian middle-distance runner

== Politicians ==
- Daniel Williams (governor-general) (1935–2024), Governor-General of Grenada
- Dan Williams (Alabama politician) (1942–2015), served in the Alabama House of Representatives
- Dan K. Williams (born 1956), serving in the Pennsylvania House of Representatives
- Dan Williams (Canadian politician), serving in the Legislative Assembly of Alberta
- Daniel Williams (Mississippi politician), first Secretary of State of Mississippi

== Musicians ==
- Daniel Williams (drummer) (1985–2025), American drummer for the band The Devil Wears Prada
- Daniel Lewis Williams, American operatic basso profundo

== Other ==
- Daniel Williams (historian) (1932–2010), American archivist and historian
- Daniel Williams (theologian) (1643–1716), Welsh theologian
- Daniel Jenkins Williams (1874–1952), American minister and historian
- Daniel Hale Williams (1858–1931), American surgeon
- Daniel Day Williams (1910–1973), American theologian, professor, and author
- Daniel Barclay Williams, American educator

== See also ==
- Danny Williams (disambiguation)
