= Pignatti =

Pignatti is an Italian surname. Notable people with the surname include:

- Ermanno Pignatti (1921–1995), Italian weightlifter
- Sandro Pignatti (1930–2025), Italian botanist

== See also ==
- Pignotti, people with this surname
