= Elwood (dog) =

2007 winner of the World's Ugliest Dog Contest

- Species: Canis lupus familiaris
- Sex: Male
- Born: 2005
- Died: November 28, 2013 (aged 7–8)
- Owner: Karen Quigley

Elwood (2005 – November 28, 2013) was the 2007 winner of the World's Ugliest Dog Contest. In the prior year, 2006, he came in second in the contest. His owner was Karen Quigley, a resident of Sewell, New Jersey. He was a two-year-old Chinese Crested/chihuahua mixed breed. Elwood died on November 28, 2013. He was eight years old.

== History ==
Elwood was rescued as a result of an NJ Society for the Prevention of Cruelty to Animals investigation. He was shivering, had a runny nose, and was making strange sounds when Karen came over to see him. Elwood still made those strange noises. Elwood's breeder felt as if Elwood was too ugly to sell and was going to put him down due to the fact that she could not sell him to anyone. Karen Quigley, Elwood's owner, was friends with John, who was the investigator that was called to the case of Elwood. Karen immediately fell in love with Elwood and took him to her home where she also owned other rescued cats and dogs.

== Appearance ==
Elwood had a strip of white hair on his head, big eyes and a tongue which was literally too large for his mouth and hung out of the side of it.

== Information ==
Karen Quigley was so inspired by the story of her dog Elwood, that she wrote a children's book about him, and it was called "Everyone Loves Elwood." Elwood quickly grew to fame with his "ugliest dog" honor, and his face began to pop up in the media everywhere. He was found in newspapers in the United States, Germany, London, Australia, Ireland, Chile, Spain, Canada, and possibly other countries as well.

== See also ==
- List of individual dogs
- Sam (ugly dog)
- Brody the Bear (Bear)
