= Miss Ellie (dog) =

Famous ugly dog (1993–2010)

- Species: Canis lupus familiaris
- Breed: Chinese Crested Dog
- Sex: Female
- Born: c. 1993
- Died: June 1, 2010 (aged 17)
- Years active: 2009-2010
- Known for: World's Ugliest Dog
- Title: World's Ugliest Dog
- Term: 2009
- Owner: Dawn Goehring

Miss Ellie (c. 1993 – June 1, 2010), was a blind American Chinese Crested hairless dog. She was entered in the 2009 World's Ugliest Dog Contest, in which she won the purebred class. The competition was featured on the Animal Planet cable show Dogs 101.

Miss Ellie was rescued at age 7 by Dawn Goehring. She appeared in shows at the Comedy Barn in Pigeon Forge, Tennessee, alongside her owner, and was used as an ambassador animal to promote responsible dog ownership.

Miss Ellie died on June 1, 2010, at age 17.

== Life ==
Miss Ellie was a purebred Chinese Crested dog. She weighed 9 pounds (4.1 kg). Miss Ellie spent most of her life inside a kennel, before being adopted at age 7 by Dawn Goehring. After adoption, she had to undergo basic training due to the neglect, and was never fully housebroken. At the time of hear death, Miss Ellie lived with 13 other rescue dogs.

== Career ==
=== World's Ugliest Dog ===
Miss Ellie had pimples and moles, and was missing several teeth, causing her tongue to slip out of her mouth. This, combined with her hairlessness (common to her breed), gave her an unusual apparance. In 2009, Goehring entered her in the World's Ugliest Dog Contest, held in Petaluma, California. She won the purebred class, but lost overall to Pabst, a boxer mix who had won the mutt class. Pabst's victory was declared an upset by some, as most of the competitors (including Ellie herself) were Chinese Cresteds. The event was televised by Animal Planet.

=== Other ventures ===
Miss Ellie was used as an ambassador dog, traveling to schools and events to promote responsible dog ownership. Pigeon Forge mayor Keith Whaley named November 12th "Miss Ellie Day", in recognition of Goehring's fundraising efforts for the Sevier County Humane Society.

In autumn 2009, after losing the World's Ugliest Dog competition, Miss Ellie was entered in American Pet Brands' Cutest Dog contest. Goehring had planned to donate the prize money to dog adoption charities. She lost the competition to a Chihuahua named Dr. Papides.

Miss Ellie performed at the Comedy Barn, a Pigeon Forge comedy club, as part of a troupe made up of Goehring and her rescue dogs.

== Death ==
Miss Ellie died on June 1, 2010, at the age of 17. At the time of her death, her owners had entered her in the 2010 Ugly Dog competition. Miss Ellie was cremated.

== See also ==
- Sam (ugly dog)
