= Yateley Complex =

British gravel pit and fishing site

Coordinates: 51°20′39.99″N 0°50′3.88″W

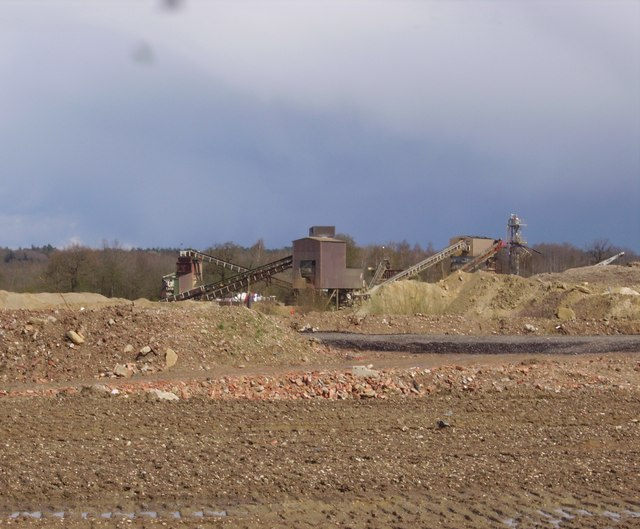
The gravel works

The Yateley Complex is a working gravel pit and a series of fishing lakes at Yateley, Hampshire, England, operated by CEMEX, the world's largest building materials supplier. The fishing side of the facility is under the management of CEMEX Angling, a subsidiary of the main company. CEMEX Angling operates 11 lakes at the site, which includes part of the River Blackwater and is stocked with a variety of fish. Around 5000 anglers a year visit the complex, which was also home to Heather the Leather (a carp), described as "Britain's most famous fish". In addition to angling use, some of the gravel pits have been restored as sports pitches and some were nominated as potential allotment sites.

== Angling ==
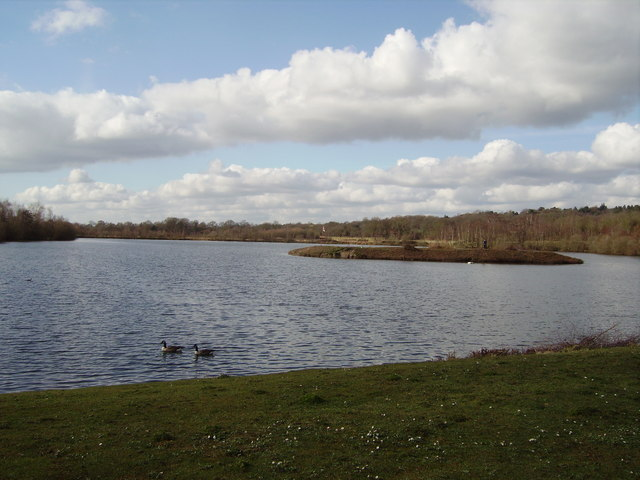
Horseshoe Lake

The complex contains the following fishing lakes:

- North Lake
- Sandhurst Lake
- Pumphouse Lake
- Horseshoe Lake (watersports only, no fishing is permitted)
- Summer Pit
- Tree Lakes (two lakes)
- Nursery Lake
- Split Lake
- Match Lake
- Car Park Lake

Fishing is also allowed in the stretch of the River Blackwater that runs through the complex. The lakes are stocked with carp, bream, tench, rudd, catfish, roach, pike, silver fish and perch. One can fish for silver fish, carp and barbel in the Blackwater. The complex is popular with anglers and around 5000 fish at the site each year.

Some of the individual lakes are famous in their own right. The Car Park Lake has been described as one of the most famous carp lakes in the country, whilst the Sandhurst lake won the "Best day ticket lake in Britain" award. Sandhurst lake, the newest in the complex, is available on a day ticket basis only with ticket available from Yateley Angling Centre

=== Heather the Leather ===
The complex was home to a 50-year-old scaleless (also known as leather) carp that has been described as "Britain's most famous fish". Heather was one of the oldest and largest carp in Great Britain and weighed 52 pounds (24 kg).

== Restoration ==
The CEMEX company has explored various means of restoration of the gravel pits after they have been exhausted. In addition to angling, they have restored some as cricket, football and hockey pitches which were donated to the local council for use as a park. As a result of this restoration the site won the Cooper Heyman cup for gravel pit restoration. In 2007 CEMEX offered a further 5 acres (20,000 m^{2}) of land to Yateley Town Council for use as allotments. This land was rejected by the council and a further site was offered in 2008.
