= Pignotti =

Pignotti is a surname of Italian origin. Notable people with the surname include:

- Lamberto Pignotti (born 1926), Italian poet, writer, and visual artist
- Lorenzo Pignotti (1739–1812), Italian poet and historian
- Ugo Pignotti (1908–1989), Italian fencer

== See also ==
- Pinotti
