= Beaufort National Cemetery =

Historic veterans cemetery in Beaufort County, South Carolina

- U.S. National Register of Historic Places
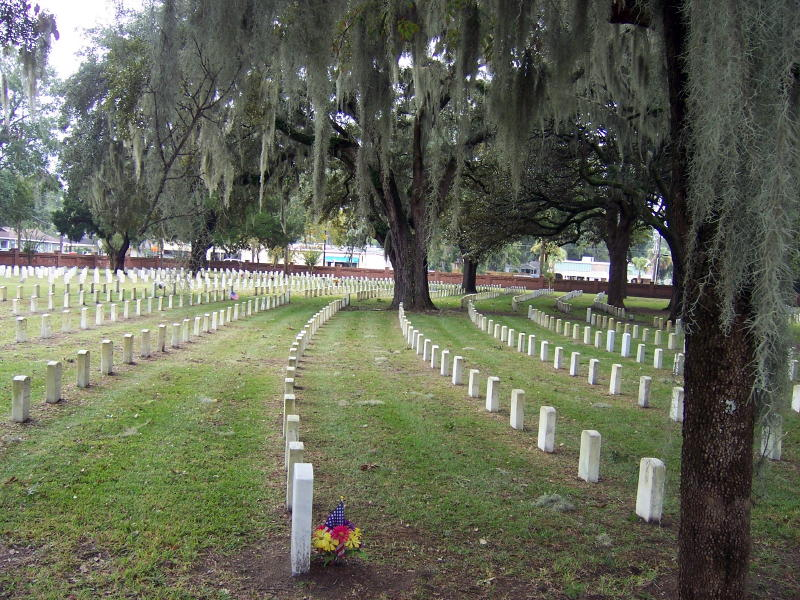
- Beaufort National Cemetery

- Location within South Carolina Location within the United States
- Location: 1601 Boundary St., Beaufort, South Carolina
- Coordinates: 32°26′29″N 80°40′47″W
- Area: 44.1 acres (17.8 ha)
- Built: 1863
- Architectural style: Colonial, Dutch Colonial
- MPS: Civil War Era National Cemeteries MPS
- NRHP reference No.: 97001208
- Added to NRHP: October 10, 1997

Beaufort National Cemetery is a United States National Cemetery in Beaufort, South Carolina. Managed by the United States Department of Veterans Affairs, it encompasses 44.1 acres (17.8 ha), and as of 2024, had over 28,725 interments.

== History ==
The original interments in the cemetery were men who died in nearby Union hospitals during the occupation of the area early in the Civil War, mainly in 1861, following the Battle of Port Royal. Battlefield casualties from around the area were also reinterred in the cemetery, including over 100 Confederate soldiers. It became a National Cemetery with the National Cemetery Act by Abraham Lincoln in 1863.

Of the Civil War soldiers buried here, there are: 9,000 Union soldiers (3,607 unknown,) 2,800 POWs from the camp at Millen and 1,700 African-American union soldiers. There are also 102 confederate soldiers. The remains of 27 Union prisoners of war were reinterred from Blackshear Prison following the war.

Beaufort National Cemetery now has interments from every major American conflict since the Civil War, including the Spanish–American War, the Korean War, the Vietnam War, and the Gulf War.

In 1987, the remains of nineteen Union soldiers of the all black Massachusetts 55th Volunteer Infantry were discovered on Folly Island, South Carolina. The Folly North Archaeological Project, 1990 did further excavations in the area after Hurricane Hugo revealed artifacts due to erosion of the soil and due to concerns of future erosion in the area. The Items discovered included leather shoes, rubberized canvas, wood staves and animal bone.

The Massachusetts 55th had been stationed on Folly Island from late 1863 to early 1864 and was a sister unit to the better-known Massachusetts 54th Volunteer Infantry, featured in the film Glory.

On May 29, 1989, the 54th soldiers were reinterred in the Beaufort National Cemetery with full military honors. Cast members from the film served as the honor guard at the ceremony.

Beaufort National Cemetery was listed on the National Register of Historic Places in 1997.

== Notable interments ==
- Medal of Honor recipients
  - Private First Class Ralph H. Johnson (1949–1968), recipient for action in the Vietnam War.
  - Captain John J. McGinty III (1940–2014), recipient for action in the Vietnam War
- Others
  - Colonel Donald Conroy (1921–1998), inspiration for the character Wilbur "Bull" Meachum in The Great Santini.
  - John N. McLaughlin (1918–2002), Marine Corps Lieutenant General, served in three wars and spent three years as POW
  - Cook Petty Officer 1st Class William Pinckney (1915–1976), second African American to be awarded the Navy Cross, for heroism during the Battle of Santa Cruz.
  - Master Sergeant Joseph Simmons, Légion d'honneur recipient, Buffalo Soldier, World War I and World War II veteran.
  - General Edwin Pollock (1899–1982)
  - Colonel Robert Gould Shaw (1837–1863), commander of the African-American 54th Massachusetts Regiment, is likely buried in one of the 3,607 unknown gravesites in the cemetery.
  - Chuck Taliano (1945–2010), USMC drill instructor featured in the "We don’t promise you a rose garden" recruitment poster during the 1970s and 1980s.
  - General William G. Thrash (1916–2011)
  - Major General Reuben Henry Tucker III (1911–1970), Commandant of Cadets, The Citadel 1963–68.
  - US Army General James Grimsley (1921–2013)
  - Major General Charles Spragins

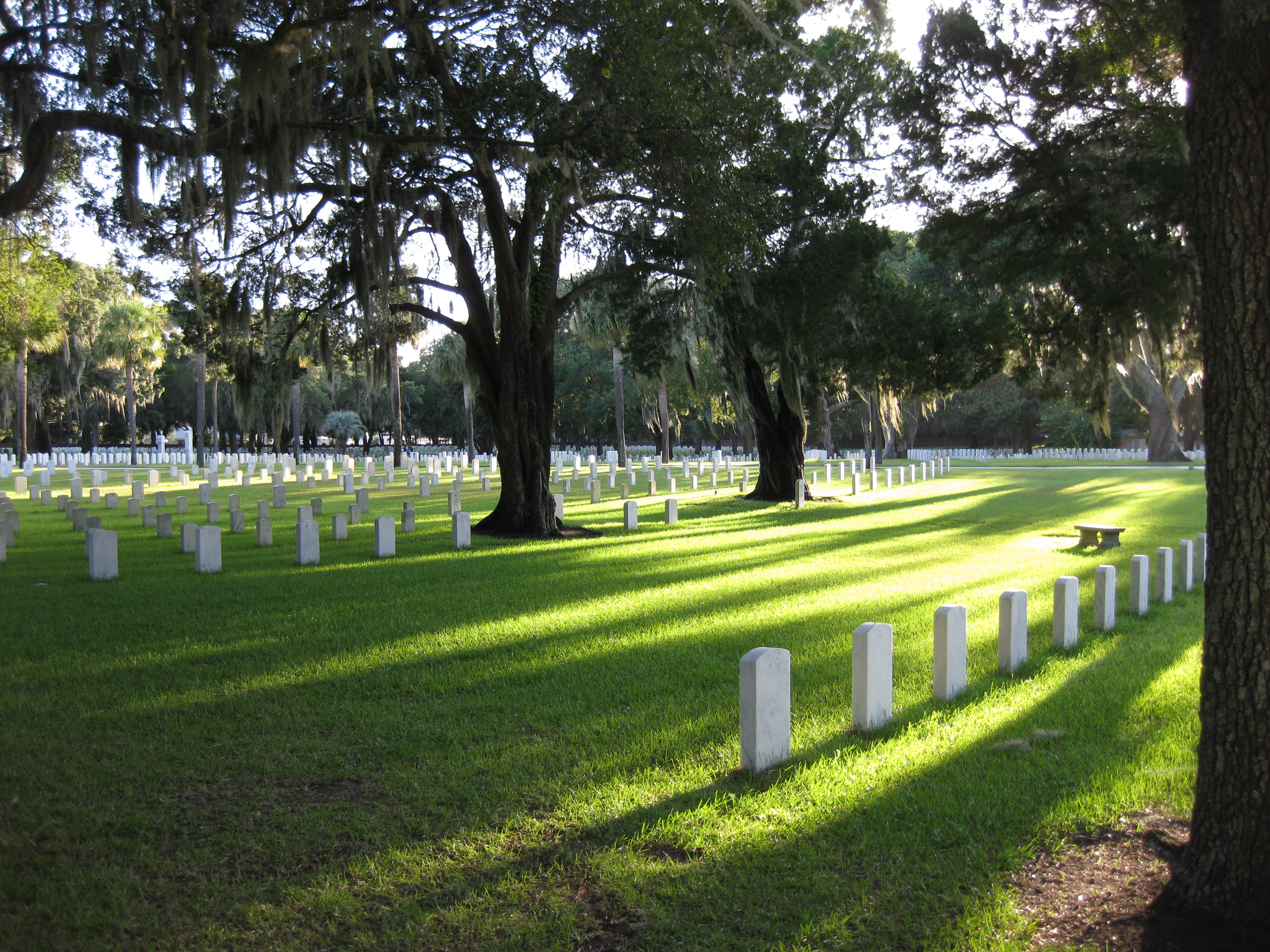
Twilight at Beaufort National Cemetery

- Non-US Servicemembers
  - Ian Ronald Atherton Adamson, Lieutenant of Royal Navy, only one of Commonwealth war dead in World War II.
  - Maschinenmaat Gerd Reusell was a crewmember of U-352 that died of wounds when it was sunk on May 9, 1942, by USCGC Icarus.
