= Danny Williams =

Danny Williams may refer to:

== Government ==
- Danny Williams (Canadian politician) (born 1949), Premier of Newfoundland and Labrador, 2003–10
- Danny Williams (Oklahoma politician), member of the Oklahoma House of Representatives
- Danny C. Williams Sr., United States Attorney for the Northern District of Oklahoma, 2012–2017

== Media ==
- Danny Williams (singer) (1942–2005), South African-born popular musician
- Danny Williams, Australian singer for CDB
- Danny Williams (TV personality)

=== Characters ===
- Danny "Danno" Williams, in the 1968–1980 television series Hawaii Five-O, and in the 2010 remake series Hawaii Five-0
- Danny Williams, in the television series My Little Pony
- Danny Williams, in the FIFA video game series, “The Journey”

== Sports ==
=== Association football (soccer) ===
- Danny Williams (footballer, born 1924) (1924–2019), English association football player and manager
- Danny Williams (footballer, born 1979), Welsh footballer
- Danny Williams (footballer, born 1981), English football agent and former player
- Danny Williams (footballer, born 1988), English footballer
- Danny Williams (soccer, born 1989), German-American soccer player

=== Rugby ===
- Danny Williams (rugby league, born 1973), Australian rugby league footballer
- Danny Williams (rugby league, born 1986), Australian rugby league footballer
- Danny Williams (rugby) (born 1986), English rugby league and union footballer

=== Other sports ===
- Danny Williams (boxer) (born 1973), British heavyweight professional boxer
- Danny Williams (judoka) (born 1989), British judoka

== See also ==
- Daniel Williams (disambiguation)
- Denny Williams (1896–1929), American baseball player
