= Pinotti =

Pinotti is an Italian surname. Notable people with the surname include:

- Henrique Walter Pinotti, Brazilian physician, surgeon, professor of surgery at the University of São Paulo's Medical School
- José Aristodemo Pinotti (1934–2009), Brazilian physician, gynecological surgeon, university professor, educational leader and politician
- Marco Pinotti (born 1976), Italian road racing cyclist for UCI ProTeam Team Columbia
- Mario Pinotti (1894–1972), Brazilian medic and sanitarist
- Roberta Pinotti (born 1961), Italian politician

== See also ==
- 12470 Pinotti, main-belt asteroid
- Plasmodium pinotti, parasite of the genus Plasmodium subgenus Giovannolaia
