= Maria Aurora (writer) =

Portuguese journalist, poet, and novelist

- Born: Aurora Augusta Figueiredo Carvalho Homem; 13 November 1937; Sátão, Viseu
- Died: 11 June 2010 (aged 72)
- Education: University of Coimbra
- Television: Atlântida

Aurora Augusta Figueiredo de Carvalho Homem (13 November 1937 – 11 June 2010), known by her pen name Maria Aurora, was a Portuguese journalist, poet, novelist, children's writer and television presenter.

Although born in Viseu District, in 1974 she settled on Madeira Island, where her contributions to culture were greatly appreciated. Funchal's City Council pays tribute to her work by hosting an award for essays on gender equality and having a street named after her.

== Works ==
=== Poetry ===
- Raízes do silêncio, Funchal, 1982.
- Ilha a duas vozes, Funchal, 1988, com João Carlos Abreu.
- Cintilações, Funchal, 1994, com João Lemos Gomes.
- Uma voz de muda espera: monografia sentimental, São Pedro do Sul, 1995.
- 12 textos de desejo, Funchal, 2003.
- Antes que a noite caia, Vila Nova de Gaia, 2005.
- Discurso amoroso, Porto, 2006.

=== Fiction ===
- A Santa do Calhau: contos, Lisbon, 1992.
- Para ouvir Albinoni, Ponta Delgada, 1995.
- Leila: contos, Vila Nova de Gaia, 2005.

=== Non-fiction ===
- Discurs(ilha)ndo: crónicas, Funchal, 1999.

=== Children's ===
- Vamos cantar histórias, Funchal, 1989.
- Juju, a tartaruga, Lisbon, 1991.
- Loma, o lobo marinho, Vila Nova de Gaia, 2005.
- Zina, a baleia azul, Vila Nova de Gaia, 2007.
- Maria e a estrela do mar, Vila Nova de Gaia, 2007.
- A fada Ofélia e o véu da noiva, Vila Nova de Gaia, 2008.
- A cidade do Funcho: a primeira viagem de João Gonçalves da Câmara, Vila Nova de Gaia, 2008.
- Uma escadinha para o Menino Jesus, Vila Nova de Gaia, 2008.
- Pedro pesquito e a Câmara dos Lobos, Vila Nova de Gaia, 2009.
- O anjo Tobias e a rochinha de Natal, Vila Nova de Gaia, 2009.
- A fada Íris e a floresta mágica, Vila Nova de Gaia, 2009.
- Marta, Xispas e a gruta misteriosa, Vila Nova de Gaia, 2010.

== Works ==
Poetry

- Raízes do silêncio, Funchal, 1982
- Ilha a duas vozes, Funchal, 1988, with João Carlos Abreu
- Cintilações, Funchal, 1994, with João Lemos Gomes
- Uma voz de muda espera: monografia sentimental, S. Pedro do Sul, 1995
- 12 textos de desejo, Funchal, 2003
- Antes que a noite caia, Vila Nova de Gaia, 2005
- Discurso amoroso. Editor Campo das letras, Porto. 89 pp. Ilustró Francisco Simões, ISBN 978-989-625-102-4, 2006

Fiction

- A Santa do Calhau: contos, Lisbon. Editor Noticias, 176 pp. ISBN 978-972-46-0575-3. 1992
- Para ouvir Albinoni, Ponta Delgada, 1995. Vol. 6 de Colecção Autores da Madeira. Editor Campo das Letras, 92 pp. ISBN 978-972-610-642-5. 2003
- Leila: contos, Vila Nova de Gaia, 88 pp. ISBN 978-989-553-153-0. 2005
- Zina, a baleia azul. Ilustró Sónia Cântara. Lisbon. Editor 7 Dias 6 Noites, 24 pp. ISBN 978-989-8048-20-2. 2007

Anthologies

- Pontos luminosos: Açores e Madeira: antologia de poesia do século XX. Vol. 149 de Fora de colecção. Con Urbano Bettencourt, Diana Pimentel. Editor Campo das Letras, 191 pp. ISBN 978-989-625-052-2. 2006
- São Vicente em fundo: antologia dos prémios do conto "Horácio Bento de Gouveia". Lisbon. Editor 7 Dias 6 Noites, 293 pp. ISBN 978-989-8232-49-6. 2009

Works for children

- Vamos cantar histórias, Funchal, 1989
- Juju a tartaruga, Lisbon. Con Maurício Fernandes. Lisbon. Editor Notícias, 191 pp. ISBN 978-972-46-0551-7. 1991
- Maria e a estrela do mar, Vila Nova de Gaia. Lisbon. Editor 7 Dias 6 Noites, 32 pp. ISBN 978-989-8048-62-2. 2007
- A fada Ofélia e o Véu da Noiva. Ilustró José Nelson Pestana Henriques, Vila Nova de Gaia. Lisbon. Editor 7 Dias 6 Noites, 48 pp. ISBN 978-989-8048-84-4. 2008
- A cidade do Funcho: a primeira viagem de João Gonçalves da Câmara. Ilustró José Nelson Pestana Henriques, Vila Nova de Gaia. Lisbon. Editor 7 Dias 6 Noites, 56 pp. ISBN 978-989-8048-93-6. 2008
- Uma escadinha para o Menino Jesus. Ilustró José Nelson Pestana Henriques, Vila Nova de Gaia. Lisbon. Editor 7 Dias 6 Noites, 48 pp. ISBN 978-989-8232-07-6. 2008
- Pedro pesquito e a Câmara dos Lobos. Ilustró José Nelson Pestana Henriques, Vila Nova de Gaia. Lisbon. Editor 7 Dias 6 Noites, 56 pp. ISBN 978-989-8232-41-0. 2009
- O anjo Tobias e a rochinha de Natal. Ilustró José Nelson Pestana Henriques, Vila Nova de Gaia. Lisbon. Editor 7 Dias 6 Noites, 40 pp. ISBN 978-989-8232-54-0. 2009
- A fada Íris e a floresta mágica. Ilustró Elisabete Henriques, Vila Nova de Gaia. Lisbon. Editor 7 Dias 6 Noites, 40 pp. ISBN 978-989-8232-75-5. 2009
- Marta, Xispas e a gruta misteriosa. Ilustró José Nelson Pestana Henriques, Vila Nova de Gaia. Lisbon. Editor 7 Dias 6 Noites, 32 pp. ISBN 978-989-686-003-5. 2010
