= Heather the Leather =

British scaleless carp

Heather the Leather (1960 – 1 June 2010) was a 50-year-old scaleless (also known as leather) carp, described as "Britain's most famous fish" Heather was an old and large carp, weighing 52 pounds (24 kg) and despite incorrect allegations in the press of being caught over 1000 times, she was likely caught by fishermen approximately 75 times. A full list of the captures was recorded by Yateley anglers on the that-aint-no-bream website. She was deemed by many carp anglers, both in the UK and across Europe, as the ultimate fish to catch given her age, history and catch difficulty.

At the time of her death in June 2010 she was around 50 years old and worth £30,000. Heather was discovered dead at the edge of a lake at Yateley Complex on 1 June 2010, and is thought to have died of old age. The fish was buried by anglers near the lake with a headstone and memorial rosebush.

== Recorded and published captures ==
- 41lb 12oz Robin Dix 1985
- 47lb 2oz Steve Pagulatos 1998
- 54lb 8oz Steve Fudge Nov 2002
