= Andi Meriem Matalatta =

Indonesian singer

Andi Siti Meriem Nurul Kusumawardhani Mattalatta, or more popularly known as Andi Meriem Mattalatta (August 31, 1957 – June 4, 2010) was an Indonesian pop singer of Buginese origin. Known for her hit releases during the 1980s, she was nicknamed "The Pearl from the South" among Indonesians.

She was born as the fifth of six children on August 31, 1957, in Makassar, Sulawesi, Indonesia. She had one daughter, Diana, with her first husband, Bambang Hertasning. She later remarried to her second husband, Hendra Pribadi.

Andì Meriem Matalatta died at a hospital in Zoetermeer, the Netherlands, of complications of multiple illnesses, including diabetes, on June 4, 2010, at the age of 53. She had been visiting the Netherlands with her daughter, Diana. She had been suffering from a gangrenous wound on her hand and hypertension.

Her body was flown back to Indonesia for her funeral.

== The 1980 Blue January Song Ever Released ==
This blue January song was released in 1980 and has the original title 'Januari' created & written by MR."Dadang S Manaf" and was published on the Black Love album. This blue January song was registered on Musica Studios And Atlantic Records Indonesia in the 1980s or 1990s on the cassette tape album "black love" and "Memory January" a song created by IIs Sugianto 20 Indonesian Pop Song Side A & B side musical works from Artlantic Records including several famous singers such as (Rano Karno.Nella Regar.Nani Sugianto.Tommy J Pisa.Erry Prima and Elly Ermawati) cassette 20 This music Indonesian Pop Song side A & B sells well on the market, there were only a few units in the 1980s to 2000s.

== Song Lyrics in Indonesian ==
Kekasihku, t'lah lama kucari bayang dirimu Tak tahan hatiku menyimpan rinduku di kalbu

Kekasihku, andai kau tahu kata hatiku Maafkan salahku saat-saat itu padamu

Biar diriku saja menjawab semua cinta Atau datang kembali di hatimu Entah sedalam apa cinta suci di dada? Biarkan kujawab semua dusta

Januari, Januari yang biru Asmaramu, asmaraku membisu Entah kapan, entah kapan hadir di hati? Saat-saat yang indah di diriku

Kekasihku andai kau tahu kata hatiku Maafkan salahku saat-saat itu padamu

Biar diriku saja menjawab semua cinta Atau datang kembali di hatimu Entah sedalam apa cinta suci di dada? Biarkan kujawab semua dusta

Januari, Januari yang biru Asmaramu, asmaraku membisu Entah kapan, entah kapan hadir di hati? Saat-saat yang indah di diriku Januari, Januari yang biru Asmaramu, asmaraku membisu

Entah kapan, entah kapan hadir di hati? Saat-saat yang indah di diriku

Januari, Januari yang biru Asmaramu, asmaraku membis Entah kapan, entah kapan hadir di hati?

== Song Lyrics in English ==
The speaker has searched for the image and indicates an inability to contain the feeling of longing.

My beloved, if you only knew my heart Forgive me for those moments to you

Let me just answer all the love Or come back to your heart I don't know how deep the sacred love is in your chest? Let me answer all the lies

January, blue January Your romance, my romance is silent I don't know when, I don't know when it will come to my heart? Beautiful moments for me

My beloved, if you knew my heart Forgive me for those moments to you

Let me just answer all the love Or come back to your heart I don't know how deep the sacred love is in your chest? Let me answer all the lies

January, blue January Your romance, my romance is silent I don't know when, I don't know when it will come to my heart? Beautiful moments for me

January, blue January Your romance, my romance is silent I don't know when, I don't know when it will come to my heart? Beautiful moments for me

January, blue January Your romance, my romance is silent I don't know when, I don't know when it will come to my heart?
