= Jack Tobin (anthropologist) =

American anthropologist

Jack Adair Tobin (June 15, 1920 – June 18, 2010) was an American anthropologist who devoted much of his life to the people of the Marshall Islands. After serving in the United States Navy during World War II, he enrolled at the University of Hawaiʻi at Mānoa, where he studied anthropology. In the 1950s he took part in a research trip to the Marshall Islands, where he continued working as a professional anthropologist and community development officer for the next two decades. After his retirement, he wrote the book Stories from the Marshall Islands.

== Early life and education ==
Tobin was born on June 15, 1920. Tobin attended the University of Hawaiʻi at Mānoa for his undergraduate studies and earned a PhD from the University of California, Berkeley in 1967.

== Career ==
Tobin served as a member of the United States Navy during World War II. Stationed in Hawaii, he was a survivor of the attack on Pearl Harbor. He was awarded a Bronze Star for his actions during the attack to save lives.

After the war, during his time in college, Tobin visited the Marshall Islands' Arno Atoll as part of a research trip. He was subsequently hired by the Navy as a anthropological consultant and returned to the islands in that capacity, staying from 1950 to 1957. After a period training Peace Corps volunteers, he worked as a community development officer on the islands from 1967 to 1975. His work especially concerned people from Bikini Atoll and Enewetak Atoll.

Tobin's book Stories from the Marshall Islands was published by the University of Hawaiʻi Press in 2002. The book, which consists of stories collected by Tobin from residents of the islands, was positively reviewed in The Contemporary Pacific and Pacific Studies. Pacific Studies specifically praised the book for avoiding "romantic embellishments that often obscure local culture."

== Later life and death ==
After his retirement from anthropology, Tobin moved to Honolulu, where he lived for the remainder of his life. Tobin died on June 18, 2010, in Honolulu. His papers are held by the Hamilton Library. In 2017, uncovered genealogies from his papers were donated to the Council of Iroij on the Marshall Islands.
