= Lobi Traoré =

- Born: 1961; Bakaridianna, Mali
- Died: 2010 (aged 48–49) Bamako, Mali
- Genres: Blues; Malian Folk; Folk; Desert blues
- Instruments: Vocals, Guitar
- Labels: World Circuit

Lobi Traoré (1961 – 1 June 2010) was a Malian musician. He was born in the village of Bakaridianna, on the Niger River close to Ségou and died in Bamako. His singing has been described in The Economist as "flat, strangely penetrating tone, somewhere between rap and blues".

His breakthrough album, Bamako, produced by Ali Farka Touré, was released in 1994. It was voted one of the best rock albums of the year by Libération and one of the best world music albums by Le Monde.

== Discography ==
- Bambara Blues (1992)
- Bamako (1994)
- Ségou (1996)
- Duga (1999)
- Mali Blue (2004)
- The Lobi Traoré Group (2005)
- Barra Coura (2005)
- Bwati Kono (2010)
- Rainy Season Blues (2010)
- Bamako Nights: Live at Bar Bozo 1995 (2013)
