= Alberto Guzik =

Brazilian actor (1944–2010)

- Born: Alberto Guzik; June 9, 1944; São Paulo, São Paulo, Brazil
- Died: June 26, 2010 (aged 66); São Paulo, São Paulo, Brazil
- Occupations: Actor, director, teacher, theater critic, writer
- Years active: 1949–2010

Alberto Guzik (June 9, 1944 – June 26, 2010) was a Brazilian actor, director, teacher, theater critic, and writer from São Paulo, Brazil. He wrote for the newspapers Ultima Hora and the Jornal da Tarde.

== Early life and career ==
In 1949, aged 5, Guzik began his career when he entered the Theater School in São Paulo, he joined a group led by Julius Gouvea and Tatiana Belinky, and joined the cast of Peter Pan with Clovis Garcia, staying connected to groups that specialized in amateur theatre productions. From 1964 to 1966, he attended the School of Dramatic Art. In 1967, his professional acting debut in The Process, which is based on the novel by Kafka, assembled core 2 of the Arena Theatre, under the direction of Leonardo Lopes. Before the end of the season, his career on stage, moved to the audience which provided critical expertise.

In 1971, Guzik began writing theatre reviews, later working for Ultima Hora (1974–78) and Istoe (1978–81). In 1982, he earned a master's degree in theatre from the School of Communications and Arts, University of São Paulo, defending his dissertation, TBC: Chronicle of a Dream. He worked as a professor of theater at EAD (1968–78) and at the ECA/USP (1969–80). Guzik later ran a version of The Spark of Abdon Milanez. He also serves as a professor in the Macunaíma Theatre School (1978–79). He participated in the program, Metropolis, from TV Culture. In 1995, Guzik wrote the novel, A Hazard of Life, which was nominated for the Jabuti Award.

== Death ==
On June 26, 2010, Guzik died, aged 66, while battling cancer, from multiple organ failure.

== Writings ==
- Risk of life (1995)
- What is to be river, and running
- TBC: chronicle of a dream (1986)
- A cruel God (1997)
- Paulo Autran, a man on stage (1998)
- Wrong (2001)
