= Chuck Taliano =

American Marine Sergeant and drill instructor

Charles Taliano Jr. (May 9, 1945 – June 4, 2010) was an American Marine Sergeant and drill instructor. Taliano was featured as a drill instructor in a well-known Marine Corps recruitment poster using the slogan, "We don't promise you a rose garden". Taliano was photographed for the poster in 1968 while waiting for an honorable discharge at Marine Corps Recruit Depot Parris Island in South Carolina.

== Life ==
Taliano was born and raised in Cleveland, Ohio. He enlisted in the United States Marine Corps in November 1963. In 1966, Taliano became a drill instructor at the Marine Corps Recruit Depot in Parris Island, South Carolina. It was also during this time that Taliano inspired his close childhood friend from Ohio CPL Stephen Roger Earley to enlist in the United States Marine Corps as well. Earley very much admired Taliano, and the two stayed close friends. They kept in contact through the years, and Earley always kept a full-sized print of his friend's famous poster hanging nearby in his home. He was proud to point it out and tell anyone who came by about his famous best friend. "They don't promise you a rose garden and it's TRUE!" he would quip. Unfortunately, Earley would never learn of his friend's passing as he was also gravely ill at the time and eventually, he died only 4 months after Taliano due to liver complications and is buried in Boulder City, Nevada at the Veterans Memorial Cemetery.

The famous poster photograph of Taliano, which features him giving a new Marine recruit an "attitude readjustment," was taken in 1968, less than one month before Taliano was honorably discharged from active duty. A reservist, who was writing a book about the Marine Recruit training boot camp at Parris Island, took the photograph of Taliano. The picture, which shows Taliano just inches from a recruit's face, would be adopted by the Marine Corps as a recruitment poster throughout the 1970s and 1980s. It added the caption, "We don't promise you a rose garden", for the poster.

Taliano was released from active duty in November 1968, less than one month after the photograph was taken. He was honorably discharged in November 1969. He worked in the publishing industry for more than 30 years. He retired to a home in Beaufort, South Carolina, in 2001.

Following his retirement, Taliano became the manager of the Parris Island Museum's gift shop, Alexander Ship's Store, in late 2002. Taliano quickly became an attraction himself, as visitors and active military personnel would stop at the museum to meet him. Stephen Wise, the curator of the Parris Island Museum told The Beaufort Gazette in 2010, "Everyone from generals to former privates would stop by to see him."

Chuck Taliano died of multiple myeloma on June 4, 2010, at his home in Beaufort, South Carolina, at the age of 65. His memorial service was held at the Recruit Chapel at the Marine Corps Recruit Depot Parris Island. He was buried at Beaufort National Cemetery.
