= Leif Alsheimer =

Swedish lawyer, lecturer and author

Leif Alsheimer (April 20, 1953 - June 27, 2010) was a famous Swedish lawyer, lecturer and author.

Alsheimer studied law at Lund University, and practiced for several years before working as a professor in Jurisprudence at Jönköping International Business School, and later visiting professor at Wellesley College in Wellesley, Massachusetts. After his return to Sweden, Alsheimer worked as an education consultant and freelance journalist for Svenska Dagbladet and Hufvudstadsbladet.

Alsheimer became a well-known figure in Swedish media after having introduced liberal arts in the law school curriculums. With his "core curriculum" he demanded that his students engaged in literature relevant not only to law, but to subjects such as history, politics and ethics.

"High school students entering universities suffer from academic bulimia; binge eat, throw up and move on", says Leif Alsheimer, professor in Jurisprudence.

In 2002, Alsheimer won Nationalencyklopedins Kunskapspris, one of the most prestigious awards in academia. Alsheimer was married to Elisabeth Alsheimer Evenstedt, with whom he had three children; Sebastian, Louise and Sophie.
