= Daniel Lewis Williams =

American operatic basso profundo (died 2023)

- Born: March 29, 1943; Ogden, Utah, U.S.
- Died: January 10, 2023 (aged 79)
- Occupation: Operatic basso profundo

Daniel Lewis Williams (March 29, 1943 – January 10, 2023) was an American operatic basso profundo.

== Biography ==
Williams was born in Ogden, Utah, but grew up in Billings, Montana, and appeared in operas and concerts as a boy soprano in the western United States. After his voice changed, he appeared frequently in musicals and won the International Kiwanis Talent Contest in New York City at 17 for his performance of "Ol' Man River" from Show Boat. He graduated with a B.A. in theater from the University of Utah in Salt Lake City. He continued his studies at the Staatliche Hochschule für Musik in Munich, Germany, studying with Ernst Haefliger, Kurt Böhme, and Kurt Moll.

Williams began his professional career with the Trier, Germany opera, with regular engagements with the Landestheater in Kiel and the theater in Krefeld. In 1989, he became the regular bass at the Deutsche Oper am Rhein in Düsseldorf.

Williams had a far-flung international career, appearing in many of the major opera houses of Europe and the United States, as well as in Japan. His signature roles are Baron Ochs von Lerchenau in Richard Strauss's Der Rosenkavalier (a role that he has performed in over 22 productions all over the world), Sarastro in Mozart's The Magic Flute, and King Philip in Giuseppe Verdi's Don Carlos, but he sang many roles that are rarely attempted by other basses because of his tremendous range. He has recently added Strauss's Die schweigsame Frau to his repertoire, and in June 2005, he sang in a production of Strauss's Daphne in La Fenice theater in Venice, Italy, with June Anderson.

Williams appeared on a DVD of Rosenkavalier recorded live at the Teatro Massimo in Palermo, which is in general distribution. He also recorded a CD with his daughter Judith Williams, a presenter on the German shopping channel, called Träume.

== Personal life and death ==
Williams was married to the former Gaye Hicks, and they had three daughters, the oldest of whom is Judith Williams, a presenter on German television and owner of a cosmetics company. They lived near Trier, Germany, for many years, and then moved to Bavaria.

Williams died from complications of Alzheimer's disease on January 10, 2023, at the age of 79.
