= Hadelin Viellevoye =

Belgian footballer

Personal information
- Date of birth: 22 November 1914
- Date of death: 18 June 2010 (aged 95)

International career
Years	Team	Apps	(Gls)
1935	Belgium	1	(0)

Hadelin Viellevoye (22 November 1914 – 18 June 2010) was a Belgian footballer, playing as a midfielder. He played in one match for the Belgium national football team in 1935.
