= Bruno Côté =

Canadian painter (1940–2010)

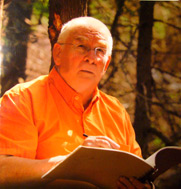
Bruno Côté in 2006.

Bruno Côté (August 10, 1940 – June 30, 2010) was a Canadian landscape painter.

== Biography ==
Bruno Côté was born in Quebec City in August 1940. His youth in a family where art held a strong significance encouraged the development of his artistic talents. He joined the family's publicity business in 1957. In 1978, he moved to Baie-Saint-Paul, where he held his first important solo exhibition. In 1980, he began to travel, painting landscapes in many different regions of Canada. Bruno Côté is represented by art galleries across Canada. Such art galleries have been for example, in the Chateau Laurier hotel of Ottawa Canada. In 2008, the Canadian Parliament gave Côté's painting, The Portage Trail to the Parliament of Scotland to mark the opening of the Scottish Parliament Building.

Côté died on June 30, 2010, in Baie-Saint-Paul, after prostate cancer had metastasized.

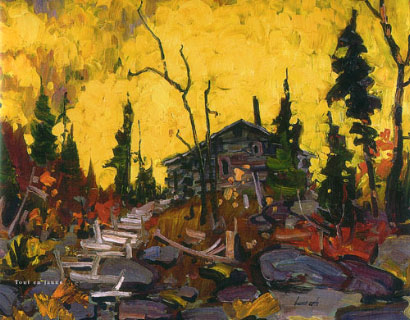
Tout en Jaune

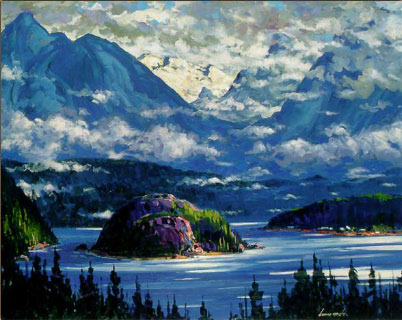
Sunshine Coast

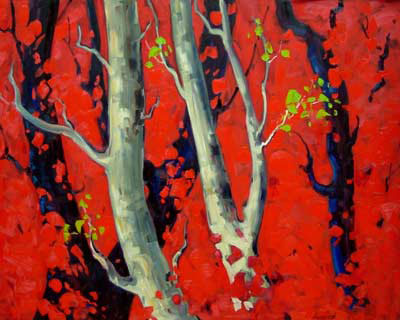
L'été du Shaman

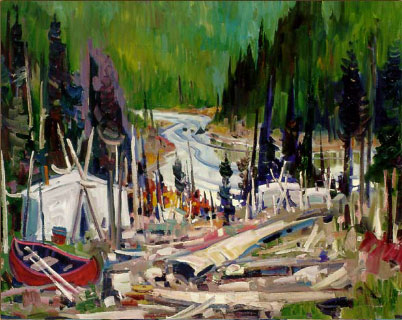
Camp montagnais

== Public collections ==
- Ambassade de Corée
- Canadian Embassy of the Federal Republic of Germany
- American Embassy, Ottawa
- Centre National d'exposition Baie‑St‑Paul
- Confederation Art Gallery and Museum, Charlottetown
- Johns Hopkins University, Baltimore, U.S.A
- Musée D'Art Contemporain de Montréal (collection Lavalin)
- Musée de Charlevoix
- Musée des beaux-arts de Montréal
- Musée Marc-Aurèle Fortin, Montréal
- United Nations, New York
- Scottish Parliament, Edinburg, Scotland
- Simon Fraser University Gallery, Vancouver
- Université Laval
- University of New Brunswick

== Publications ==
- Babinska, Roxane; Jean-Éric Riopel. Bruno Côté : Beyond the Land. ISBN 2-921585-62-6.
- Thibault, Marie-Josée (2005). Bruno Côté : A Man in His World. Ottawa, Ont.: Galerie d'art Vincent. ISBN 2-921585-85-5.
- Bruno Côté / Louis Bruens. Sainte-Agathe-des-Monts, Quebec: Éditions La Palette. 1990. ISBN 2-9801060-4-6.
- Fournier, Martin (1999). Moods and colours of a Land : Bruno Côté. Trans. Katherine Baker. Ottawa: Galerie d'art Vincent. ISBN 2-921585-38-3.
- Assier, Maurice; Paul V. Beaulieu (1985). Bruno Côté. LaPrairie, Québec: Éditions M. Broquet. ISBN 2-89000-094-X.
- Parent, Célyne. Bruno Côté peintre. Dynix. OCLC 46528633.
- Babinska, Roxane; Jean-Éric Riopel (2003). Bruno Côté : au-delà du paysage. Ottawa: Éditions V. Fortier. ISBN 2-921585-62-6.
