= Alan Krueck =

Alan Henry Krueck (November 15, 1939 – June 24, 2010) was an American musicologist, editor, and professor of German language, and the head of the North American branch of the International Draeseke Society.

== Early life ==
Krueck was born in Rochester, New York in 1939.

== Career ==
Krueck wrote his doctoral dissertation, The symphonies of Felix Draeseke: a study in consideration of developments in symphonic form in the second half of the nineteenth century for the University of Zurich in 1967. This was the first English-language study of Draeseke's music. In 1993, Krueck founded the North American adjunct of the International Draeseke Society, and produced a number of CDs on the society's label. He also edited, among other works, the previously unpublished 2nd of Draeseke's sonatas for viola alta and his opera Bertran de Born.

He was professor emeritus at California University of Pennsylvania.

He died on June 24, 2010, in Brownsville, Pennsylvania.
