= World's Ugliest Dog Contest =

Annual contest held in Petaluma, California, US

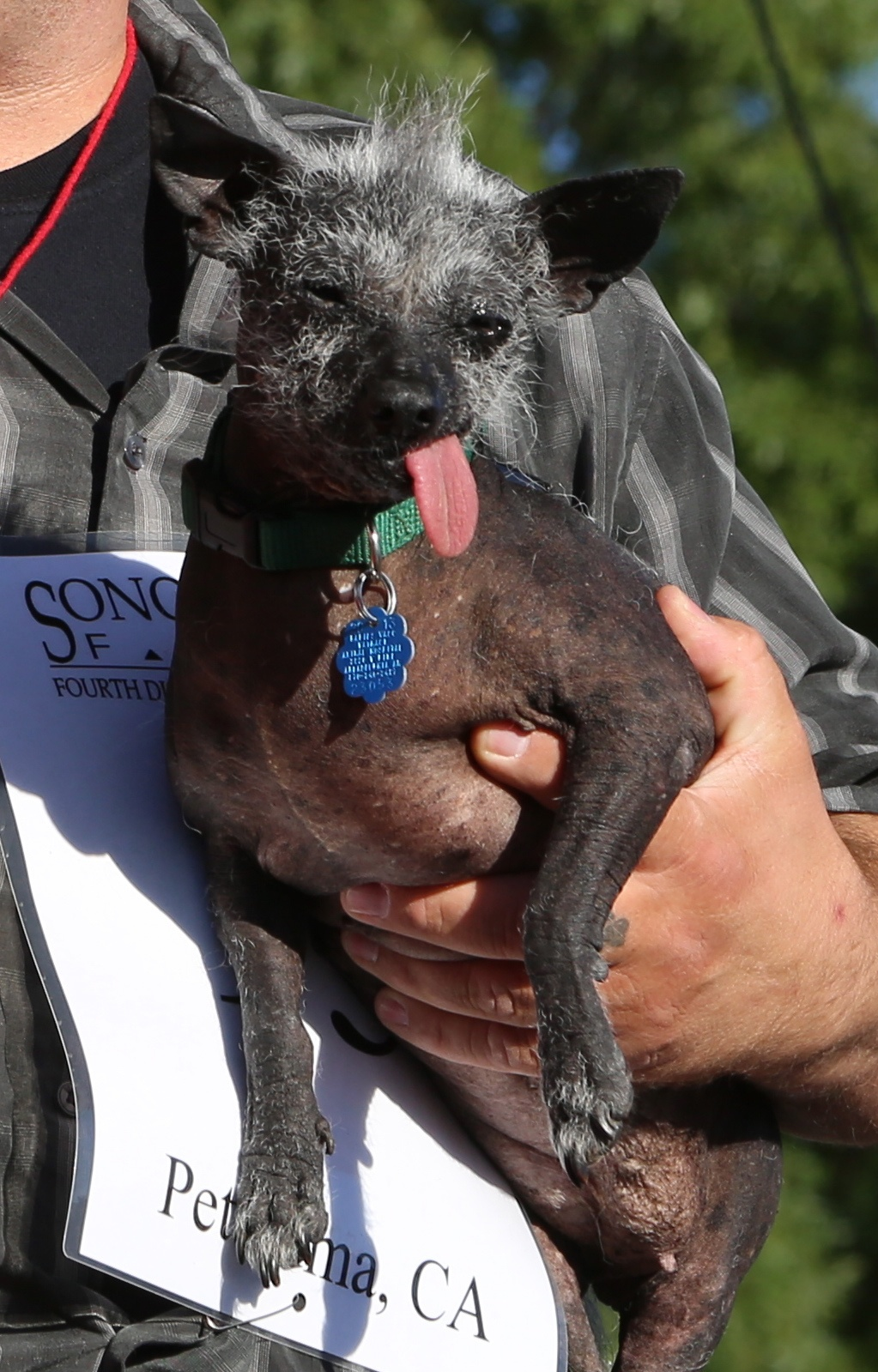
A 2013 contestant

The World's Ugliest Dog Contest is an annual contest held since the 1970s that takes place at the Sonoma-Marin Fair in Petaluma, California during the fourth week of June. One dog is crowned “The World’s Ugliest Dog” and its owner receives a trophy, a check for $1,600 (in 2017), and a free trip to New York City. There is significant media coverage, and as many as 20,000–30,000 people attend the contest during the fair each year. The fair now holds an all-day Dog Lovers' Festival preceding the evening contest.

In 2009 the Sonoma-Marin Fair trademarked the phrase World's Ugliest Dog. An anniversary book titled "World's Ugliest Dogs" was published in 2013, featuring text by the producer of the past seven years, Vicki DeArmon, and photos from World's Ugliest Dog Contests of years past.

== History ==
The World’s Ugliest Dog Contest began in the 1970s as a way to generate revenue for the Old Adobe Association in Petaluma, and member Ross Smith is widely credited as the creator of the contest. After the association considered replacing their pet parade with a dog contest, Smith suggested an ugly dog contest, and the idea stuck. The Old Adobe Association nurtured the World’s Ugliest Dog Contest in its infancy, with Smith emceeing until 1981. Winners for the contest have been recorded since 1976, and it became a part of the Sonoma-Marin Fair in 1988. Animal Planet began sponsoring and filming the competition in 2006, bringing additional attention to the event.

== Participation ==
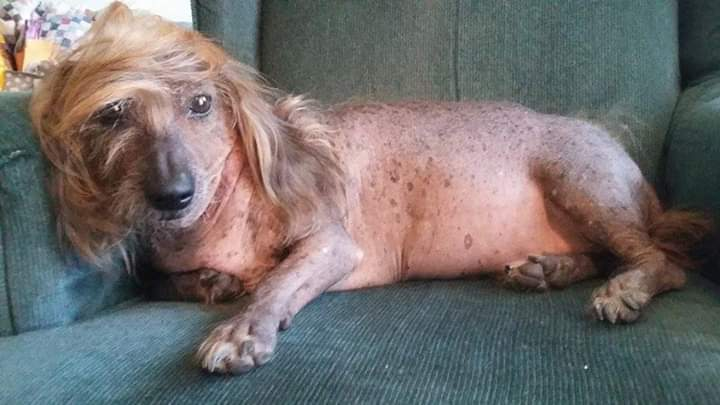
Due to his reported resemblance to Donald Trump, an entrant in the World's Ugliest Dog Contest attracted attention.

Dogs generally come from across the United States but are welcome to enter from around the world. In contrast to conformation shows (which are restricted to purebreds), the World's Ugliest Dog Contest has separate divisions for pedigreed dogs and mutts, with the two winners then competing for the overall prize, and contestants are not judged against any breed specification.

Dog owners must provide documentation of veterinarian checks to determine the competing animal is healthy. The Sonoma-Marin Fair has also partnered with animal rights groups such as the Sonoma County Humane Society to educate the public about animals and to provide opportunities to adopt rescue dogs. The fair issues a photo of the winner, a press release summing up the contest, and YouTube video within hours of the contest conclusion. Contestants for each new year are featured on the website before the contest as well in the World's Ugliest Dog Voting.

== Winners ==
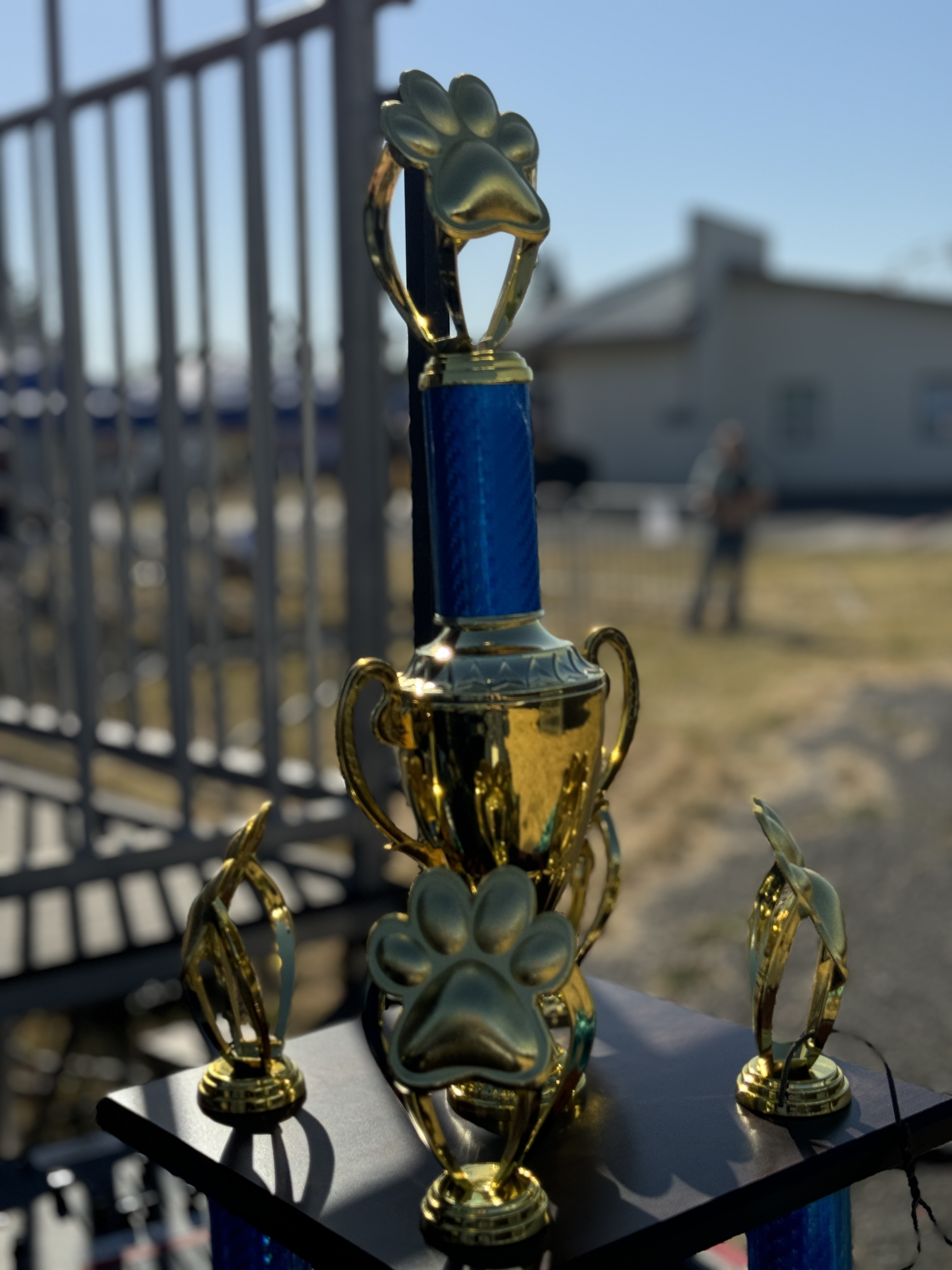
Contest trophy, 2024

Contest winners are recorded since 1976, and include Boomer, a French mastiff, in 1996.

=== 1999–2001 ===
Nana, the contest winner for three years between 1996 and 2001 and a previous winner of the mutt division, was a three-pound chihuahua mix with a sidelong walk. She appeared on the cover of a RatDog album and twice on The Tonight Show. She died in 2001.

=== 2002 ===
Rascal, a 7 lb. Chinese Crested owned by actor Dane Andrew of Sunnyvale, California, won the title in 2002 and is now in “The Ring of Champions”. Rascal went on to win the 2008 Oldest Ugly Dog Contest in Fort Bragg, the Tim Downs Ugly Dog Contest in 2008, the 2009 Ugly Dog Contest in Highland, and the 2009 Regal Cinemas "Hotel For Dogs" Ugly Dog Contest in Florida. As of June 2010, he had won ten Ugly Dog contests. Rascal was so ugly that Jay Leno put him on The Tonight Show before he had ever even won, and he was cast in four horror movies, seen on The View, Last Call with Carson Daly, and The Insider. He has his own leash line, cartoon strip, and documentary, the proceeds of which go to animal charities.

=== 2003–2005 ===
Sam, a blind Chinese Crested dog from Santa Barbara, California, was voted the world's ugliest dog three times in a row, from 2003 through 2005. He died in November 2005, bringing an end to his three-year reign.

=== 2006 ===
Scandal erupted during the 2006 World's Ugliest Dog Contest when an as yet unidentified person gained unauthorized electronic access to the contest's internet voting page and deleted 40,000 votes from then leader "Pee Wee", son of "Sam", and 30,000 votes from second-place "Victoria", according to marketing director Vicki DeArmon. To rectify the situation, fair officials decided to completely restart internet voting on May 22, 2006. The official winner, Archie, was selected by a panel of judges on June 23, 2006. Archie died July 2008.

=== 2007 ===
The winner of the 2007 World's Ugliest Dog competition was a Chinese Crested-chihuahua mixed-breed dog named Elwood, who had placed second the previous year. Rascal, who won the 2002 title, became the Ugliest Dog on the West Coast. With the loss of Archie and Elwood, Rascal is the only dog alive to be "Ring of Champions" World's Ugliest Dog. Most of the competitors in the competition were also Chinese Crested, because the breed can exhibit exaggerated traits like a mohawk, bug eyes, and a long, wagging tongue. Elwood died at the age of 8 on November 28, 2013.

=== 2008 ===
The 2008 World's Ugliest Dog competition was won by a Chinese Crested dog named Gus. Eleven dogs took part in the competition.

Rascal, the 2002 World's Ugliest Dog and Ring of Champions holder, won the World's Oldest Ugly Dog Contest in Fort Bragg, California on August 30, 2008, making him the only dog to win both top titles.

On November 10, 2008, Gus died. He was 9 years old. Runner up Rascal, The 2002 World's Ugliest Dog, represented the Contest and Fair officially as the World's Ugliest Dog in the Petaluma Butter and Eggs parade.

=== 2009 ===
Pabst, a boxer mix owned by Miles Egstad of Citrus Heights, California, won the 2009 World's Ugliest Dog competition; Miss Ellie, a blind 16-year-old Chinese Crested Hairless, won in the pedigree category; Pabst beat her in a run-off for the overall title.

Miss Ellie died June 1, 2010, at the age of 17.

=== 2010 ===
Princess Abby, a chihuahua with "a hunched and peculiar walk due to that her back legs are longer than her front (which allows her to have moments of bipedalism), a missing eye, and mismatched ears", won the 2010 contest out of a field of 25 dogs. Despite being a rescue dog, she was entered in the pedigree division.

=== 2011 ===
Yoda, a previously abandoned 14-year-old Chinese Crested-Chihuahua mix with a malformed nose, "short tufts of hair, protruding tongue, and long, seemingly hairless legs", won the 2011 contest. The dog is from Hanford, California, and is owned by dog groomer Terry Schumacher.

Yoda died in her sleep at her home in Hanford, California on March 10, 2012. She was 15.

=== 2012 ===
The 2012 winner was Mugly, an 8-year-old Chinese Crested with a short snout, beady eyes, and several unkempt white whiskers, owned by Bev Nicholson of Peterborough, England. Mugly was the first dog from outside the United States to win.

=== 2013 ===
In 2013 Walle, a four-year-old "huge-headed, duck-footed mix of beagle, boxer and basset hound" from Chico, California, beat 29 other contenders to win the contest after being entered at the last minute.

=== 2014 ===
The 2014 contest was won by Peanut (alternately named Opossum), a 2-year-old mutt believed to be a mix of Chihuahua and Shih Tzu. In contrast to most of the contestants, Peanut's physical deformities, which include deformed lips and eyelids (which give the dog the appearance of a perpetual growl) and significant loss of hair, were a result of being abused as a puppy; owner Holly Chandler of Greenville, North Carolina rescued the dog from an animal hospital.

=== 2015 ===
Quasi Modo, a 10-year-old mutt with Dutch Shepherd and pit bull lineage, won the 2015 contest, narrowly beating two Chinese Crested/Chihuahua mixes. According to the dog's biography, Quasi Modo's shortened frame, hunched back and long legs relative to her body led to confusion at first glance as to whether she was a dog or a hyena. Her owner is from Loxahatchee, Florida and rescued her from a shelter.

=== 2016 ===
The winner of the 2016 contest was SweePee Rambo, a Chinese Crested from Van Nuys, California.

=== 2017 ===
Martha, a 3-year-old Neapolitan Mastiff owned by Shirley Dawn Zindler of Sebastopol, California, won the 2017 contest. Weighing in at 125 pounds and having extremely loose and droopy jowls, the once-blind rescue dog was particularly noted for her uncooperative personality, being described as a "snoring, gassy" dog that refused to show off for the crowd, bosses around other dogs in her company, slobbers all over human guests, and knocks over water buckets.

=== 2018 ===
The 2018 contest was won by Zsa Zsa, an English bulldog with a particularly wide-legged stance, underbite, and very long droopy tongue.

2018 was the first year to award the People's Choice Award, based solely on the online voting results. The winner was Himisaboo, a 12-year-old Chinese Crested-Dachshund mix from Oregon.

=== 2019 ===
Scamp the Tramp, a mutt with unkempt hair that grows into dreadlocks and stubby legs and who was rescued from the streets in Compton, California, won the 2019 contest; his owner, Yvonne Morones, also owned Nana when she won the contest.

The People's Choice award went to Meatloaf, a bulldog with protruding teeth from Sacramento, California.

=== 2020–2021 ===
Due to the COVID-19 pandemic, the 2020 and 2021 competitions were canceled.

=== 2022 ===
Mr. Happy Face, a 17-year-old hairless Chinese Crested-Chihuahua mix who was adopted from a shelter in Arizona after being rescued from a hoarder's house, won the 2022 competition.

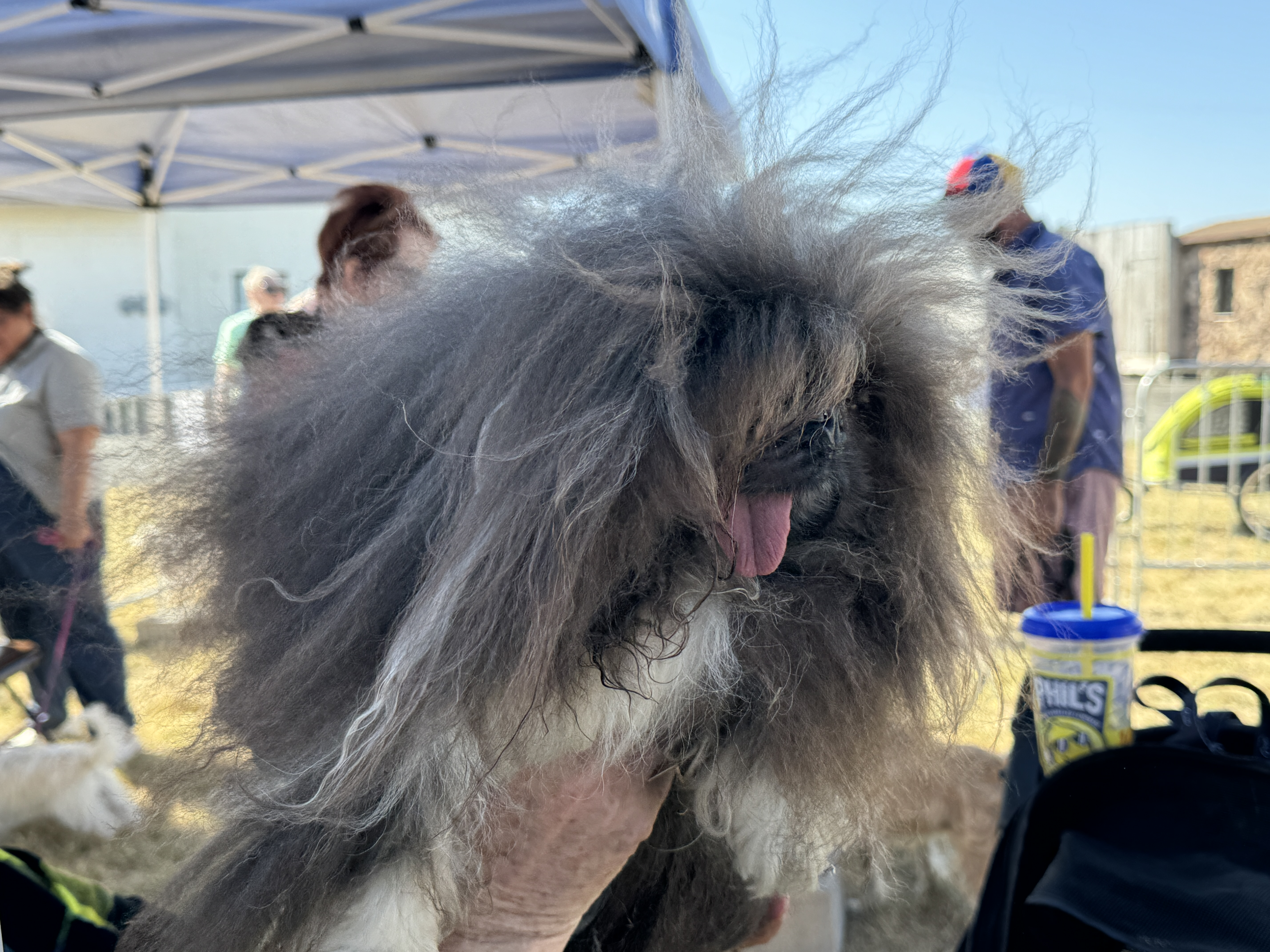
Wild Thang, winner of the 2024 contest

=== 2023 ===
The 2023 competition winner was Scooter, a seven-year-old Chinese Crested with reversed hind legs who uses a mobility cart. Scooter was adopted from Saving Animals From Euthanasia in Tucson, Arizona.

=== 2024 ===
Wild Thang, an eight-year-old Pekingese from Coos Bay, Oregon, was the 2024 winner. Wild Thang, whose prominent features include extremely long and unkempt hair, has competed in the competition five times; surviving distemper at a young age caused his teeth not to grow in, so that his tongue protrudes.

=== 2025 ===
The 2025 winner was Petunia, a hairless English-French bulldog mix from Eugene, Oregon.

=== 2026 ===
Jinny Lu, a 6-year-old pug, won on her fourth attempt, after finishing as the runner-up in 2025. She was known for screaming at her reflection in the mirror.

== Television and film ==
Animal Planet has sponsored the event and broadcast the show on television for several years. In the 2009 contest, the event included celebrity judges such as Jon Provost ("Timmy" on the 1950s television show Lassie) as well as an Ugly is the New Beautiful Fashion Show featuring models and adoptable rescue dogs. Hosts rotate each year. In 2013, syndicated radio hosts Bob & Sheri hosted the show.

In 2011, the contest was the subject of an hour-long indie documentary entitled Worst in Show, produced by Don Lewis and John Beck.

== See also ==
- List of individual dogs
