= 2006 Broward County murders =

2006 murder spree in Broward County, Florida

- CCTV video of the killer, Brian Bethell, with his girlfriend, Natasha Edwards, visiting a convenience store shortly after the second murder
- Location: Broward County, Florida, U.S.
- Date: February 3–24, 2006
- Attack type: Spree killing
- Deaths: Angel Pedro Medina (41); Albert Avenaim (63) and Frederick Gunther (76)
- Perpetrator: Brian Ricardo Bethell

Over three weeks in February 2006, three men (Angel Medina, Albert Avenaim, and Frederick Gunther) were fatally shot in Broward County, Florida, for the purpose of robbery. Video surveillance of the killer using the victims' credit cards was eventually used to link Brian Bethell, a 40-year-old Bahamian native, to murders, an he was arrested along with his girlfriend. Bethell, who confessed to the crimes, would ultimately die before his trial could begin.

== Murders ==
On January 20, 2006, Brian Bethell robbed two vacationing doctors at gunpoint, telling them both to hand over their wallets, cell phones, and car keys. Both men obliged and netted Bethell $600, and he left both men unharmed. On February 3, Bethell spotted Angel Pedro Medina a 41-year-old accountant at a convenience store in Fort Lauderdale, and proceeded to follow him in his car to a spot where Medina was known to bring food to feed local homeless people. Once both confronted one another, Bethell attempted to rob Medina, during which he shot and killed Medina, and fled the scene.

On February 10, Bethell spotted 63-year-old retired businessman Albert Avenaim outside a restaurant in Hallandale. Bethell approached Avenaim in the parking lot and robbed him, not long after shooting and killing him. Within hours after Avenaim's murder, Bethell, Edwards, and her two children, were spotted on surveillance cameras with Avenaim's credit card in multiple shops in Plantation, Sunrise, Margate, and finally in Coral Springs. On February 24, Bethell approached a condo at around 7 p.m. As he walked, he noticed 76-year-old Frederick Gunther, and promptly shot and killed him.

A test of the gun that killed Avenaim, which was a 38-caliber revolver, was compared to the gun used to kill Medina, and it was a match. Investigators got a tip when workers from a store in Fort Lauderdale spotted a couple using Gunther's credit card, and they gave the police the tag number on their vehicle. The couple was tracked down, and their identity was proved to be Bethell and Edwards, and both were arrested.

== Perpetrator ==
Brian Ricardo Bethell (April 1965 – June 15, 2010) was a native of Nassau, Bahamas.

Bethell was arrested in March 1983, a month prior to his 18th birthday, on charges of sexual assault and battery with a deadly weapon, for which he was sentenced to four years in prison. Upon getting out, Bethell was arrested two more times for marijuana possession and loitering. In 1990, he was again arrested in Tallahassee, Florida for larceny and cocaine possession, for which he served a year in jail. In 1994, Bethell was under arrest again, this time in Leon County, for marijuana possession, and was given a year of probation.

In 1997, Bethell was detained by Hollywood police on charges of assaulting a police officer, as well as other drug offenses. He was not given time in prison and instead was given probation. In 2001, Bethell was once again arrested for cocaine and marijuana possession. In 2005, he rented a place at the 400th block of Southwest 65th avenue with 20-year-old Natasha Rashone Edwards and her two young children. By later accounts from his neighbors, they described Bethell as someone with a mean look and a loud mouth.

== Criminal charges ==
Bethell was indicted on three counts of first-degree murder, while Edwards was charged with grand theft. In a jail call with her great-grandmother, Edwards was reportedly crying, exclaiming that "I didn't do it, Brian did". Edwards was convicted in June on the theft charges and was sentenced to 10-years imprisonment. Bethell didn't shift responsibility away and admitted to each of the killings, but claimed the first murder, that of Angel Medina, was in self-defense, something Medina's family denied. On June 15, 2010, Bethell died at age 45 before his trial could begin. On May 1, 2015, Edwards was released from prison after serving nine years. Her current whereabouts are unknown.

== See also ==
- Recidivism (The act of an offender often re-offending)
