= Luis Arturo Mondragón =

Honduran journalist

Luis Arturo Mondragón (died June 14, 2010) was a Honduran journalist who worked as the news director for Chanel 19 Honduras in El Paraíso, Honduras. Mondragon was shot and killed while sitting with his son outside their home in Danlí, Honduras, on June 14, 2010. He was the ninth journalist or media professional to be killed in Honduras in 2010.

Mondragón had been the subject of threats relating to investigative reporting against corruption by local and national politicians. A series of disputes, as well as allegations of rape and cattle theft had been leveled against Mondragón before his murder.

Mondragon's murder took place between 9:30 and 10:00 p.m. outside his home in Danlí. Nine media professionals - eight journalists and one radio personality - were killed in Honduras in 2010. All the slain journalists were investigating controversial issues within Honduran society, including corruption, drug trafficking and human rights abuses.
