= Waldemar Ciesielczyk =

Polish fencer

Personal information
- Born: 31 October 1958 Poznań, Poland
- Died: 18 June 2010 (aged 51) Poznań, Poland

Sport
- Sport: Fencing

Waldemar Ciesielczyk (31 October 1958 – 18 June 2010) was a Polish fencer. He competed in the team foil event at the 1988 Summer Olympics.
