= Sam (ugly dog) =

Triple champion of World's Ugliest Dog Contest

- Species: Canis lupus familiaris
- Breed: Chinese Crested Dog
- Sex: Male
- Born: November 7, 1990
- Died: November 18, 2005 (aged 15)
- Title: World's ugliest dog
- Term: 2003—2005
- Owner: Susie Lockheed

Sam (November 7, 1990 – November 18, 2005) was a blind, pure bred Chinese Crested dog, and three-time champion of the annual Sonoma-Marin Fair World's Ugliest Dog Contest in Northern California in 2003–2005. His unique appearance earned him international fame.

His owner, Santa Barbara resident Susie Lockheed, took him in as a rescue dog in 1999 from his first owner.

In 2005, Sam starred on Criss Angel's 2005 Mindfreak Halloween Special, which aired on the A&E Network. Sam played the role of Angel's cat, dressed up in a Halloween costume. Sam was featured on Japanese television, New Zealand radio and the Daily Telegraph in England.

Due to age-related diseases, Sam was euthanized on November 18, 2005, just 12 days after his 15th birthday.

== See also ==
- List of individual dogs
- Elwood (dog)
- Peggy (dog)
- Brody the Bear (Bear)
