= Hermann Gonçalves Schatzmayr =

Brazilian virologist and researcher

Hermann Gonçalves Schatzmayr (May 11, 1936 – June 21, 2010) was a Brazilian virologist and researcher of Austrian descent. He was the head of the Department of Virology at the Instituto Oswaldo Cruz (IOC / Fiocruz) for 30 years and was the president of the institution from 1990 to 1992. He was one of the most important virologists from Brazil.
