= Daniel Williams (historian) =

American archivist and historian

Daniel Thomas Williams Jr. (1932–2010) was an American archivist and historian. He was the first African American to be honored as a fellow of the Society of American Archivists and was Head University Librarian at Tuskegee University from 1968 to 1999.

== Personal life and education ==
Williams was born on September 20, 1932, to Willie Mae and Daniel T. Williams Sr. and grew up in Miami, Florida. He had two brothers, Emmett J. and Rodney M. Williams.

He graduated from West Virginia State College, now University, in 1956 with majors in Spanish and History. One year later, he received his Master's in Library Science from the University of Illinois at Urbana-Champaign. He later returned to graduate school and graduated from American University with a certificate in archival administration in 1968. Williams did post-graduate work at both the University of Michigan and the University of Chicago. He returned once again for his doctorate from Auburn University in Alabama, where he graduated in 1987.

He retired in 1999 when he was diagnosed with Alzheimer's disease. He died on June 24, 2010, in Hollywood, Florida.

== Career ==
With his master's, he was hired right after graduation at the Tuskegee Institute as a serials librarian in 1957. He later advanced to the position of Director of the university's Professional Libraries in 1966 and later, the University Archivist in 1969.

Among many projects and responsibilities at Tuskegee, he became the curator for the Daniel James Memorial Hall in 1987. He also served as an Assistant Professor and continued to work in the Archives throughout his time there. He retired in 1999.

=== Affiliations ===
- In 1972, Williams was part of the US Delegation of the World Congress on Archives, which met in Moscow.
- Consultant for the Martin Luther King Jr. Center for Social Change
- Consultant for the Library of Congress Manuscript Division

=== Awards ===
- Academy of Certified Archivists, 1989
- Fellow of the Society of American Archivists, 1992
