= Henrique Walter Pinotti =

Brazilian physician and gastric surgeon

Henrique Walter Pinotti (1929 – June 21, 2010) was a Brazilian physician and gastric surgeon, and a full professor of surgery at the University of São Paulo's Medical School. He was the author of the book Accesso ao Esôfago Torácico por Transecção Mediana do Diafragma (1999). Pinotti became notable in 1985 by operating on the elected president Tancredo Neves.

Pinotti died of cancer, at age 81, on June 21, 2010, in São Paulo, Brazil.
