= Chinese Crested Dog =

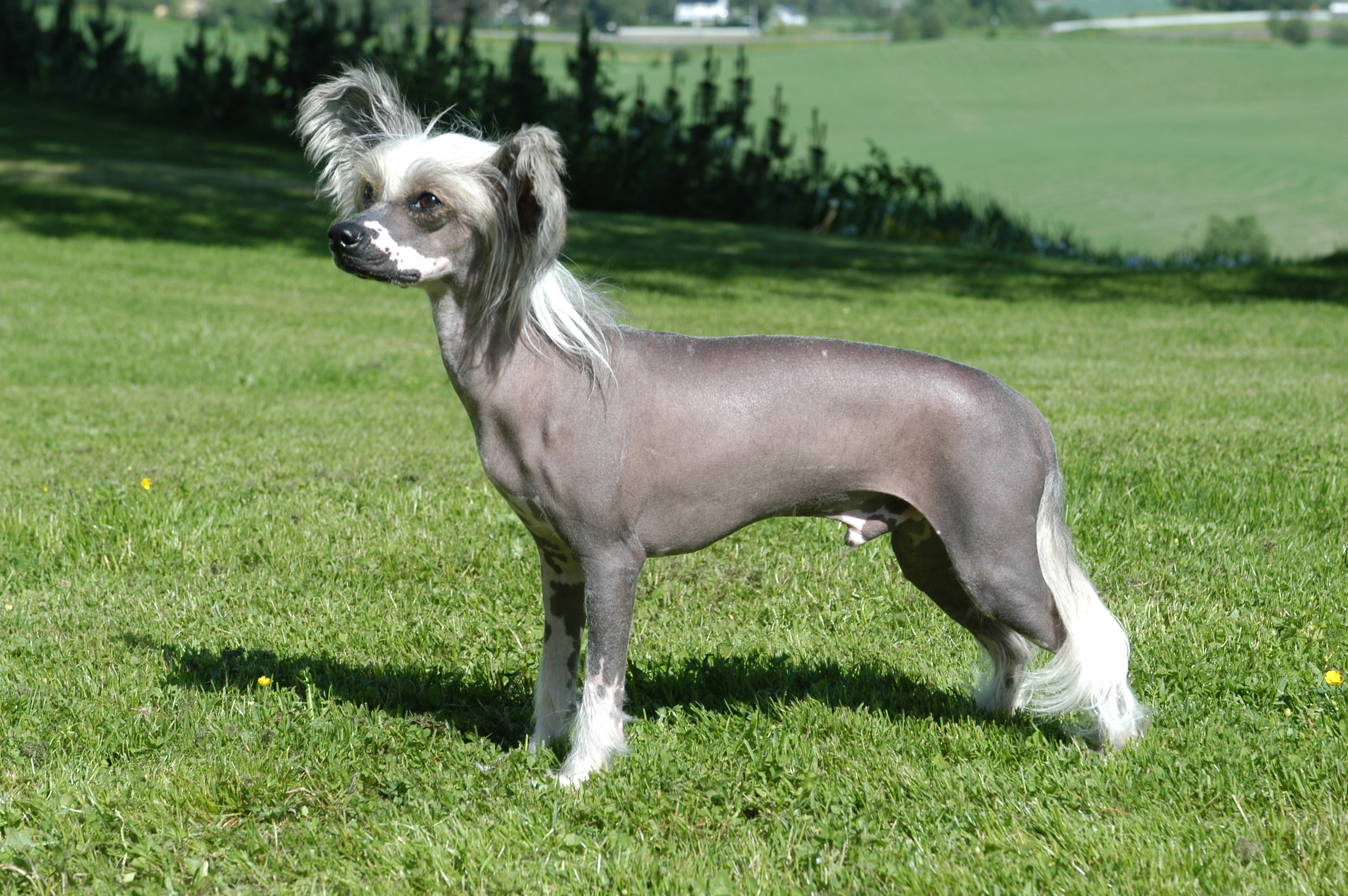
- Adult male
- Common nicknames: Crested, Puff
- Origin: Unknown
Kennel club standards
- China Kennel Union: standard
- Fédération Cynologique Internationale: standard

The Chinese Crested Dog is a hairless breed of dog. Like most hairless dog breeds, the Chinese Crested Dog comes in two varieties, without hair and with hair, which can be born in the same litter: the hairless and the powderpuff.

== Description ==
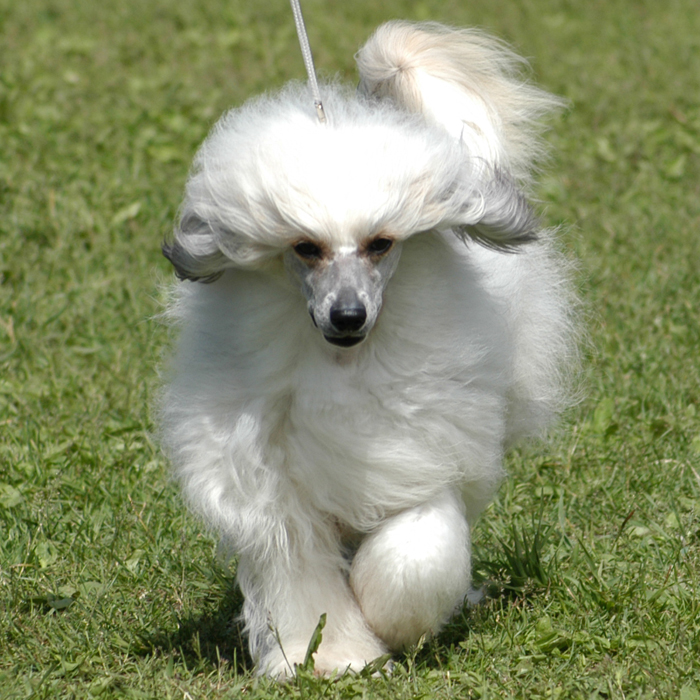
The coated variety is called "Powderpuff", and is a recognized type

The Chinese Crested is considered an extra small breed, weighing on average 10–13 lb (4.5–5.9 kg). The height is 11 to 13 inches (27–33 cm). The breed is fine-boned, with almond-shaped eyes and large, erect ears. There is no color standard for the breed.

At first look, the hairless and powderpuff varieties of Chinese Crested Dogs appear to be two different breeds, but hairlessness is an incomplete dominant trait within a single breed. The Hairless has soft, humanlike skin, as well as tufts of hair on its paws ("socks") and tail ("plume") and long, flowing hair on its head ("crest"). In addition to being an incomplete dominant gene, the "hairless" gene has a prenatal lethal effect when homozygous. Zygotes affected with double hairless genes never develop into puppies, and are reabsorbed in the womb. All hairless Chinese Crested Dogs are therefore heterozygous.

The hairless variety can vary in amount of body hair. Hair on the muzzle, known as a beard, is not uncommon. A true hairless often does not have as much furnishings (hair on the head, tail, and paws). The difference between a hairless with a copious amount of hair and a powderpuff is that the hairless has a single coat with hairless parts on the body, while the powderpuff has a thick double coat. The skin of the hairless comes in a variety of colors, ranging from a pale flesh to black. Hairless Chinese Crested Dogs often lack a full set of premolar teeth, but this is not considered a fault.

A powderpuff has a long, soft coat. Both hairless and powderpuff varieties can appear in the same litter. The look of the powderpuff varies according to how it is groomed. When its hair is completely grown out on its face, it strongly resembles a terrier; however, the powderpuff is usually shaved around the snout as a standard cut. The powderpuff Chinese Crested Dog is an elegant and graceful dog who makes a loving companion, playful and entertaining. The powderpuff's coat is long and silky soft.

The amount of body hair on the Hairless variety varies quite extensively, from the true hairless which has very little or no body hair and furnishings, to what is called a "hairy hairless" dog, which, if left ungroomed, often grows a near-full coat of hair. These hairy hairless dogs are not a mix between powderpuffs and hairless Chinese Crested Dogs, but are merely a result of a weaker expression of the variable hairless gene. The mutation responsible for the hairless trait was identified in 2008.

== Care ==
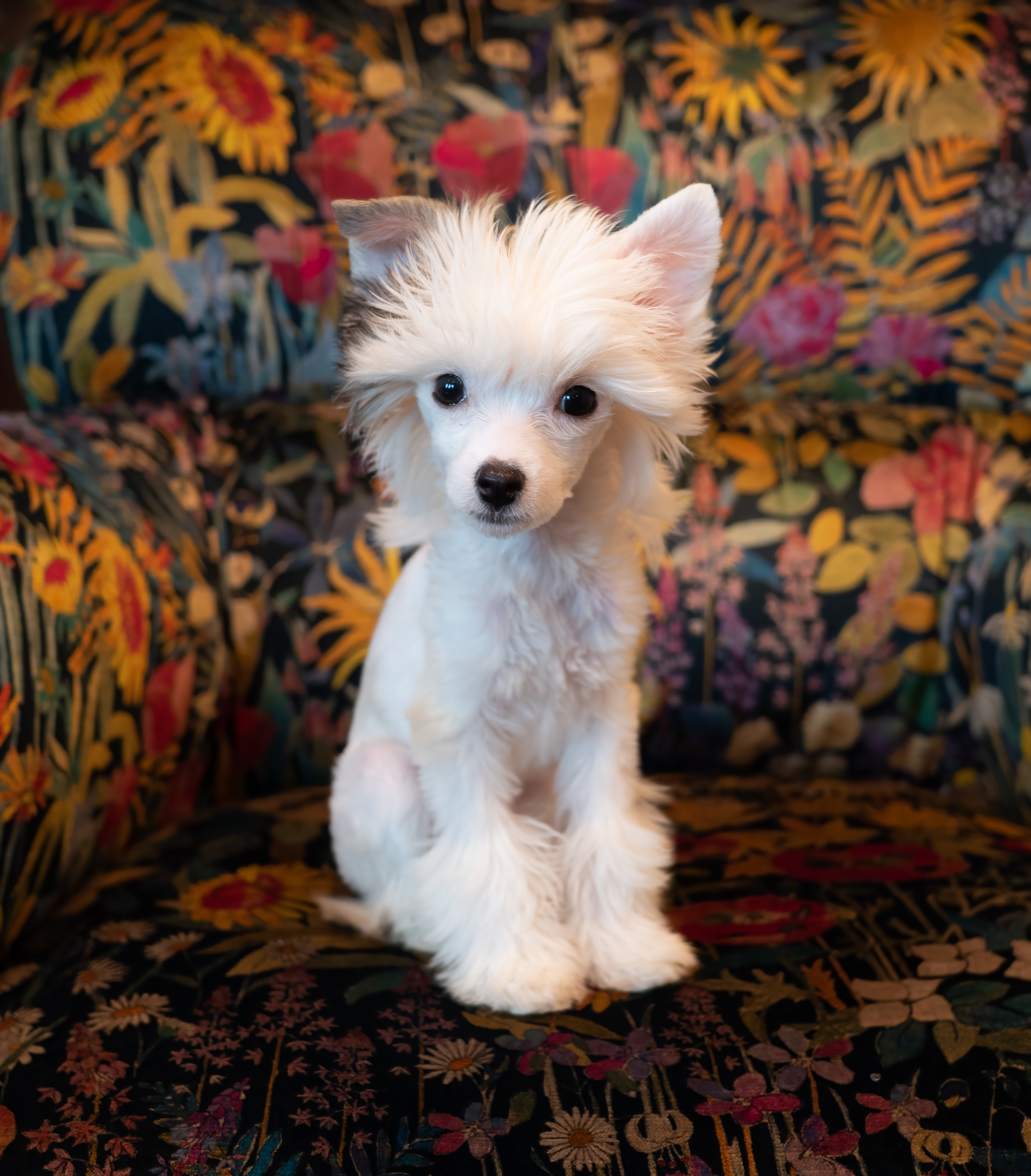
12-week-old Chinese Crested puppy, Powderpuff

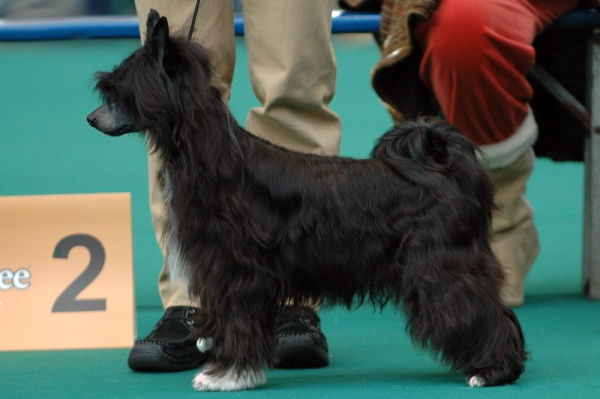
Chinese Crested Dog, Powderpuff

Both varieties require certain amounts of grooming. The powderpuff is entirely covered with a double, very soft, straight coat. Although a powderpuff's coat does not continuously grow, it can grow to be quite long at full length; a weekly bath and frequent brushing typically helps to prevent matting. For an optimal coat, it is recommended not to brush the dog's coat when dry or dirty, as a light spray of water or grooming spray to their coat is recommended before brushing. Many choose to shave their powderpuff in a "pony cut" leaving long hair on the bottom of legs, tail, head and crest for an easy care coat. The breed has "little to no shedding".

Maintenance of the hairless variety's skin is similar to maintaining human skin and as such it can be susceptible to acne, dryness, and sunburn. Hypoallergenic or oil-free moisturizing cream can keep the skin from becoming too dry when applied every other day or after bathing. Burning can occur in regions that are subject to strong UV radiation, especially in lighter-skinned dogs. Many owners apply baby sunscreen to their pets before spending time in strong sun. Some Chinese Crested Dogs have skin allergies to lanolin.

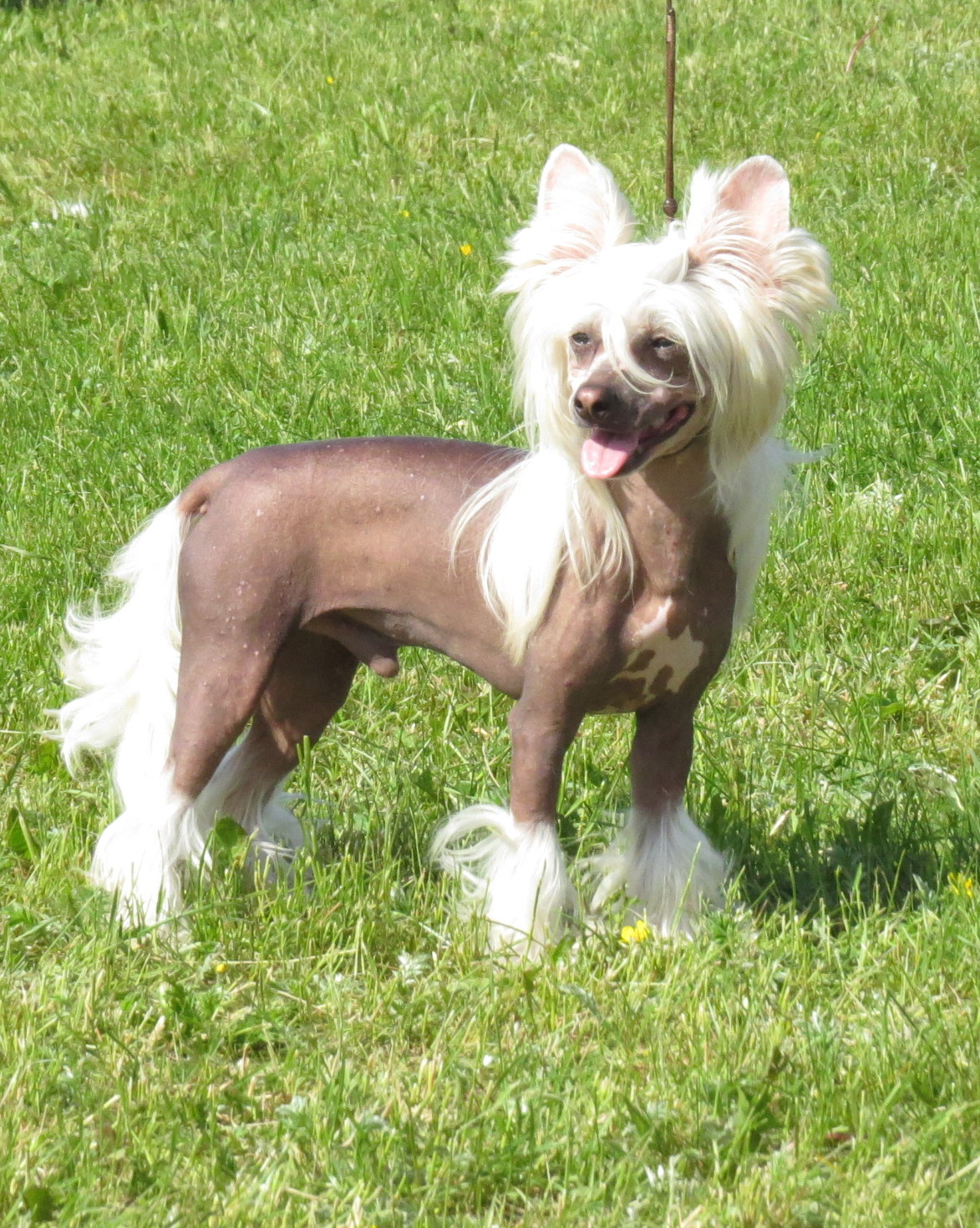
Chinese Crested Dog, Hairless variety, light skin

Unless the dog is a "true" hairless (one with virtually no hair growth on non-extremities), trimming and/or shaving is often performed to remove excess hair growth.

The Chinese Crested Dog is further distinguished by its hare foot (having more elongated toes), as opposed to the cat foot common to most other dogs. Because of this, the quicks of Cresteds run deeper into their nails, so care must be taken not to trim the nails too short to avoid pain and bleeding.

Cresteds enjoy going outdoors for daily exercise, although they are not a high energy breed. Being an intelligent breed, this dog does well in obedience type sports. Consistency is a must; however, this breed can be relatively sensitive and should have a gentle trainer. The powderpuff is adept at learning and performing tricks.

== Health ==
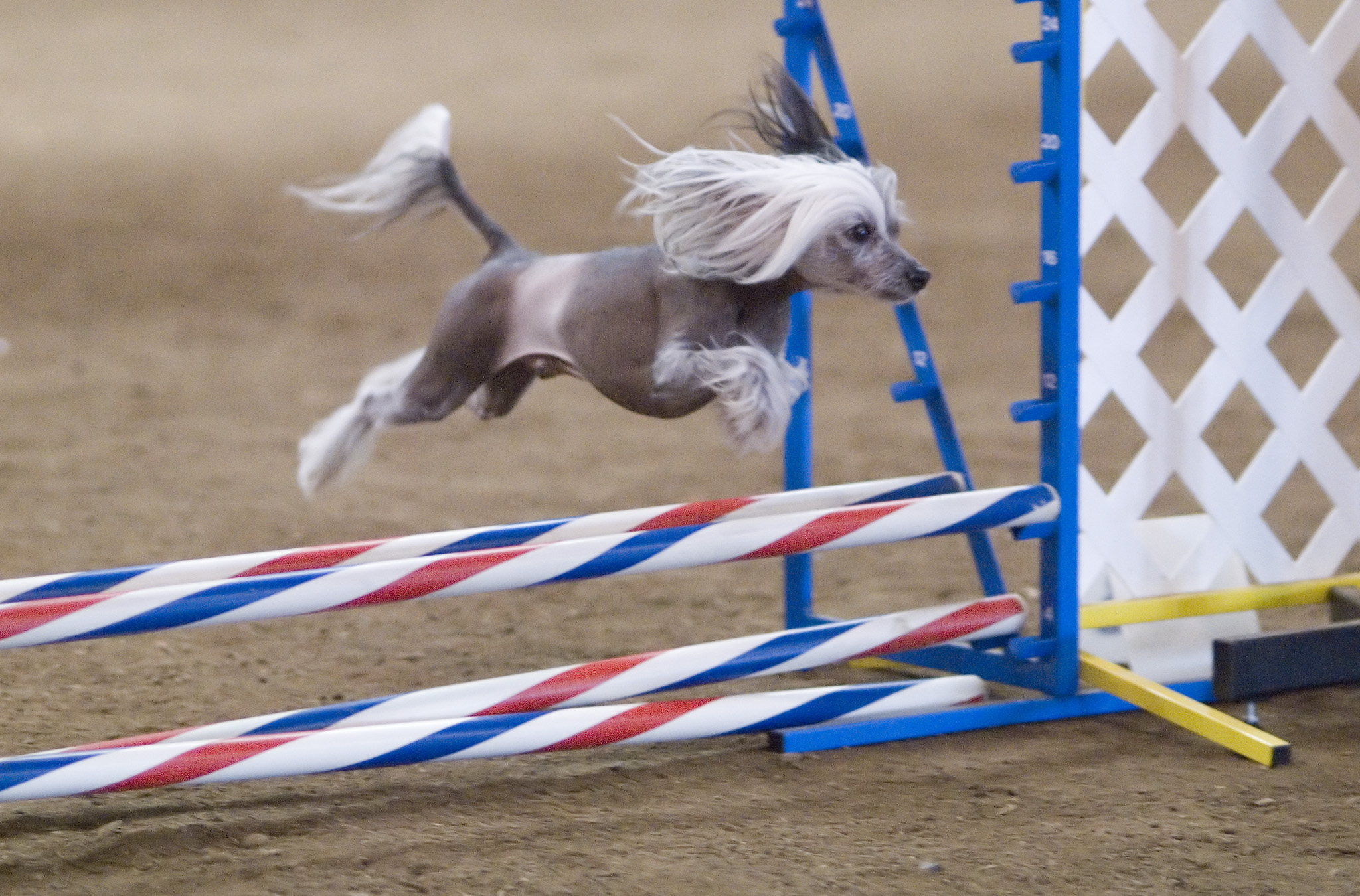
A Hairless Chinese Crested Dog participating in an agility competition

A 2024 UK study found a life expectancy of 13.4 years for the breed compared to an average of 12.7 for purebreeds and 12 for crossbreeds.

Hairless varieties of the Cresteds can be prone to poor dentition. Poor dentition may include missing or crowded teeth and teeth prone to decay when not properly cared for. Most dogs of the Powderpuff variety have few, if any, dental defects.

Eye problems are a concern within the breed, which has a higher incidence of primary lens luxation (PLL) than most other breeds. The Chinese Crested Dog can also have at least two forms of progressive retinal atrophy (PRA) which can eventually lead to blindness as well. For PLL and one of the forms of PRA, a genetic test can be performed to determine if a dog is a 'carrier', 'clear', or 'affected'. Since the test can only reveal the existence of affected or carrier status of one form of PRA, breeders and owners of the breed should still have regular eye exams by veterinary ophthalmologists. The breed also suffers from another eye disease called keratoconjunctivitis sicca or dry eye syndrome (DES).

Along with Kerry Blue Terriers, Chinese Crested Dogs can develop canine multiple system degeneration (CMSD) also called progressive neuronal abiotrophy (PNA) in Kerry Blue Terriers. This is a progressive movement disorder that begins with cerebellar ataxia between 10 and 14 weeks of age. After 6 months of age, affected dogs develop difficulty initiating movements and fall frequently. The gene responsible has been mapped to canine chromosome 1.

As with all other toy breeds, the Chinese Crested Dog can be prone to patellar luxation. This inheritable condition is caused by shallow knee joints (stifles) and results in kneecaps that pop out of place. Onset is often at a young age, and can cause temporary to permanent lameness based on the severity. Breeders should have their stock certified free of patellar luxation. Many countries' kennel clubs maintain a centralised registry for health results.

The Chinese Crested is one of the more commonly affected breeds for primary lens luxation which is caused by an autosomal recessive mutation of the ADAMTS17 gene.

== History ==
Although hairless dogs have been found in many places in the world, it is unlikely that the origins of the modern Chinese Crested Dog are in China. The same genetic mutation shared with the Xoloitzcuintli leads to the theory that they have a shared origin. It is thought the origins of the modern Chinese Crested dog are either Africa or, more likely, Mexico.

Spanish explorers found Chinese Crested dogs in Mexico and other parts of Central and South America as early as the 1500s. British, French, and Portuguese explorers likewise found the breed in various parts of Africa and Asia during the 1700s and 1800s.

In the 1950s, Debora Wood created the "Crest Haven" kennel and began to purposefully breed and record the lineages of her Chinese Crested Dogs. The famous burlesque dancer Gypsy Rose Lee also bred Chinese Crested Dogs, and upon her death her dogs were incorporated into Crest Haven. These two lines are the true foundation of every Chinese Crested Dog alive today. Ms. Wood also founded the American Hairless Dog Club in 1959, which was eventually incorporated into the American Chinese Crested Club (ACCC) in 1978. The ACCC became the US parent club for the breed when the Chinese Crested Dog was recognized by the American Kennel Club 13 years later, in 1991.

The Chinese Crested Dog was officially recognised by the Fédération Cynologique Internationale in 1987 and by the American Kennel Club in 1991.

== Genetics ==
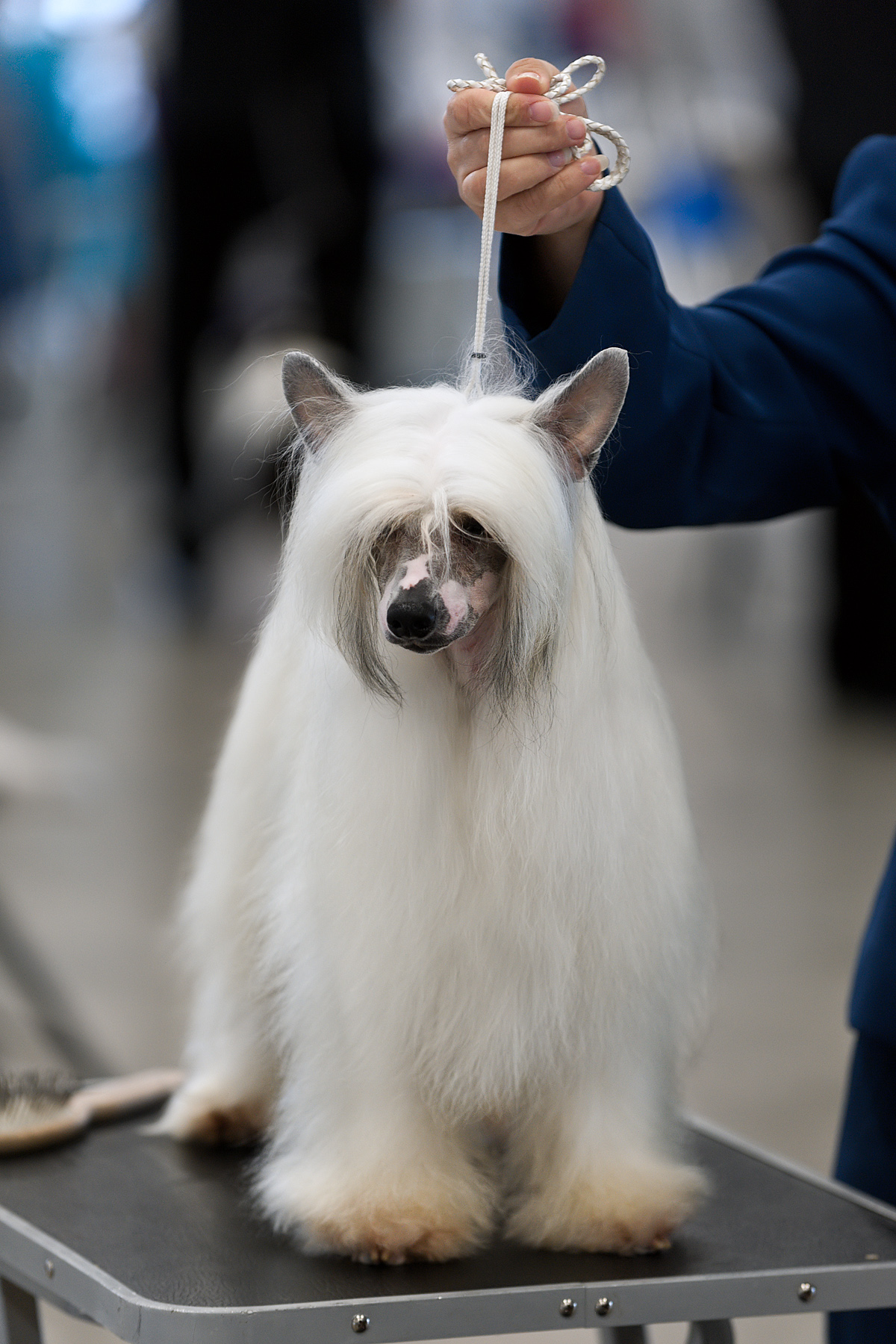
A Powderpuff Chinese Crested Dog at a dog show in 2011

Hairless Chinese Crested Dogs are heterozygous for the mutation that causes hairlessness. The allele that causes hairlessness is lethal in utero when inherited as a homozygous dominant trait. Powderpuffs are homozygous recessive for the trait.

== In popular culture ==
A hairless purebred Chinese Crested Dog named Sam was the winner of the World's Ugliest Dog Contest from 2003 to 2005.

== See also ==
- Companion dog
- Lap dog
- List of dog breeds
- Toy Group
