= Deaths in February 2010 =

The following is a list of notable deaths in February 2010.

Entries for each day are listed alphabetically by surname. A typical entry lists information in the following sequence:

- Name, age, country of citizenship at birth, subsequent country of citizenship (if applicable), reason for notability, cause of death (if known), and reference.

== February 2010 ==
=== 1 ===
- Willie Anku, 60, Ghanaian music theorist, ethnomusicologist, composer, and performer, traffic collision.
- Jim Atherton, 86, Welsh footballer.
- Julian Edwin Bailes Sr., 95, American politician, attorney and judge, stroke.
- Jack Brisco, 68, American professional wrestler, complications from open heart surgery.
- David Brown, 93, American film producer (Jaws, Cocoon, A Few Good Men), renal failure.
- Rodolfo de Anda, 66, Mexican actor, thrombosis.
- Steingrímur Hermannsson, 81, Icelandic politician, Prime Minister (1983–1987, 1988–1991).
- Bobby Kirk, 82, Scottish footballer, dementia.
- Atsushi Kuroi, 40, Japanese professional drifting driver, motorcycle accident.
- Azzeddine Laraki, 80, Moroccan politician, Prime Minister (1986–1992).
- Peter Martell, 71, Italian film actor.
- Justin Mentell, 27, American actor (Boston Legal, G-Force), traffic collision.
- Subir Raha, 61, Indian executive, chairman and managing director of ONGC (2001–2006), lung cancer.
- Jaap van der Poll, 95, Dutch Olympic javelin thrower (1936 Summer Olympics).

=== 2 ===
- Juan del Campo, 87, Spanish Olympic field hockey player.
- Louisa Benson Craig, 68, Burmese-born American beauty queen and community leader.
- Myron Donovan Crocker, 94, American federal judge.
- Cochin Haneefa, 58, Indian Malayalam film actor, multiple organ failure.
- Futa Helu, 75, Tongan philosopher.
- Paul Herlinger, 80, American voice actor,
- Tahir Hussain, 72, Indian film director, producer and writer, cardiac arrest.
- Bernard Kates, 87, American actor, sepsis and pneumonia.
- Svetozar Kurepa, 80, Croatian mathematician.
- Aleen Leslie, 101, American screenwriter (A Date with Judy), pneumonia.
- Rosa Lobato de Faria, 77, Portuguese writer and actress, complications from anemia.
- Eustace Mullins, 86, American political writer, author and biographer, stroke.
- Rex Nettleford, 76, Jamaican scholar and choreographer, heart attack.
- Ng Teng Fong, 82, Chinese-born Singaporean businessman, complications from a cerebral hemorrhage.
- Jens-Anton Poulsson, 91, Norwegian military officer and resistance fighter (heavy water sabotage).
- Srinivas Rangaraj, 77, Indian cricketer.
- Nelli Shkolnikova, 82, Ukrainian-born Australian violinist and educator, cancer.
- Raymond Wang Chong Lin, 88, Chinese Roman Catholic prelate, Bishop of Zhaoxian, cerebral hemorrhage.
- Donald Wiseman, 91, British Assyriologist.
- William Yurko, 83, Canadian politician, MP for Edmonton East (1979–1984).

=== 3 ===
- Faiza Ashraf, 26, Pakistani-Norwegian shop assistant, strangulation.
- Claudio Corti, 81, Italian mountaineer.
- Elazar ben Tsedaka ben Yitzhaq, 83, Palestinian Samaritan High Priest.
- Frank Fasi, 89, American politician, Mayor of Honolulu (1969–1981, 1984–1994), natural causes.
- John McCallum, 91, Australian actor and television producer (Skippy the Bush Kangaroo).
- Dick McGuire, 84, American basketball player, New York Knicks senior consultant, Basketball Hall of Famer, ruptured aortic aneurysm.
- Gil Merrick, 88, English footballer (Birmingham City).
- Princess Regina of Saxe-Meiningen, 85, German princess, wife of Otto von Habsburg.
- Frances Reid, 95, American actress (Days of Our Lives).
- John Rety, 79, Hungarian-born British poet and anarchist.
- Lindsay Thomas, 31, Canadian stage actress, lung cancer.
- Georges Wilson, 88, French actor and film director.

=== 4 ===
- Kostas Axelos, 85, Greek philosopher.
- Gul Hameed Bhatti, 63, Pakistani journalist and editor, stroke.
- Bill Dudley, 88, American football player (Pittsburgh Steelers), Pro Football Hall of Famer, stroke.
- Manuel Esteba, 68, Spanish film director.
- Richard Lashof, 87, American mathematician, after long illness.
- Tomás Mac Giolla, 86, Irish politician, after long illness.
- Cecil Heftel, 85, American businessman and politician, U.S. Representative from Hawaii (1977–1986), natural causes.
- D. Van Holliday, 69, American physicist, complications of cardiac surgery.
- Alfred Käärmann, 87, Estonian resistance fighter, member of the Forest Brothers.
- Phillip Martin, 83, American tribal chief (Mississippi Band of Choctaw Indians), stroke.
- H. A. Perera, 59, Sri Lankan actor, after short illness.
- Meir Pichhadze, 54, Georgian-born Israeli artist and painter, cancer.
- Joseph Ignace Randrianasolo, 62, Malagasy Roman Catholic prelate, Bishop of Mahajanga (1999–2010).
- Carl E. Taylor, 93, American physician and expert on international health, prostate cancer.
- Te Wei, 95, Chinese animator, respiratory failure.
- Helen Tobias-Duesberg, 90, Estonian-born American composer.
- Allan Wicks, 86, British organist and choirmaster.

=== 5 ===
- Bayken Ashimov, 92, Kazakh politician.
- Brendan Burke, 21, Canadian-born American ice hockey player, traffic collision.
- Peter Calvocoressi, 97, British historian, publisher and intelligence officer.
- Ian Carmichael, 89, British actor (Lucky Jim, Private's Progress, I'm All Right Jack).
- Mallia Franklin, 57, American singer.
- Galimzyan Khusainov, 72, Russian footballer.
- Sujit Kumar, 75, Indian actor and producer, cancer.
- Frank Magid, 78, American media consultant, creator of Action News, lymphoma.
- Hiroyuki Oze, 24, Japanese baseball player, suicide by jumping.
- Clarke Scholes, 79, American Olympic gold medal-winning (1952) swimmer, heart failure.
- Harry Schwarz, 85, South African lawyer, politician and diplomat, leader of the anti-apartheid movement, after short illness.
- Brooks Thomas, 78, American publisher (Harper and Row), complications of a brain injury after a fall.

=== 6 ===
- Micky Axton, 91, American aviator (Women Airforce Service Pilots), after short illness.
- Albert Booth, 81, British politician, MP for Barrow-in-Furness (1966–1983), Secretary of State for Employment (1976–1979).
- Robert Dana, 80, American poet, Iowa poet laureate (2004–2008), pancreatic cancer.
- Sir John Dankworth, 82, British jazz musician.
- Richard Delvy, 67, American drummer (The Bel-Airs), composer and record producer, after long illness.
- Brad Ecklund, 87, American football player (New York Yanks), heart failure.
- Ernest van der Eyken, 96, Belgian composer, conductor and violist.
- Kipkemboi Kimeli, 43, Kenyan athlete, 1988 Olympic bronze medalist, complications from pneumonia and tuberculosis.
- Lee Yung-dug, 83, South Korean politician, Prime Minister (1994), pneumonia.
- Henry A. Miley Jr., 94, American soldier, U.S. Army four-star general.
- Marjorie Murray, 85, British socialite, witness at the Nuremberg and Tokyo war crimes trials.
- Nancy Sweezy, 88, American folklorist, potter and writer.
- Donald Welsh, 66, American publisher (Outside), drowning.

=== 7 ===
- Lars Aspeflaten, 85, Norwegian barrister and politician.
- Franco Ballerini, 45, Italian road racing cyclist, rally crash.
- Daniel Joseph Bradley, 82, British physicist.
- Jean-Marie Buisset, 71, Belgian Olympic bobsledder and field hockey player, after short illness.
- Bobby Dougan, 83, Scottish footballer.
- André Kolingba, 73, Central African politician, President (1981–1993).
- Paul LaPalme, 86, American baseball player, after long illness.
- Lim Soo-hyeok, 40, South Korean baseball player (Lotte Giants), cardiac dysrhythmia.
- Mihailo Marković, 86, Serbian philosopher.
- Kasturi Rajadhyaksha, 86, Indian physician.
- Robert Roxby, 83, Australian cricketer.
- Oscar da Silva, 89, Brazilian Olympic equestrian.
- William Tenn, 89, American science fiction writer and educator, heart failure.

=== 8 ===
- Angelo Franzosi, 88, Italian footballer.
- David Froman, 71, American actor (The Edge of Night, Matlock), cancer.
- Antonio Giolitti, 94, Italian politician.
- Jimmie Heuga, 66, American Alpine ski racer, 1964 Olympic bronze medalist, multiple sclerosis.
- Robert Hoy, 82, American actor (The Enforcer) and stuntman, cancer.
- Carl Kaysen, 89, American economist, Deputy National Security Advisor (1961–1963), complications from a fall.
- Dieter Klauß, 62, German Olympic hockey player.
- Bernard Lander, 94, American rabbi, founder of Touro College.
- John Murtha, 77, American politician, U.S. Representative from Pennsylvania (1974–2010), complications of gallbladder surgery.
- Anna Samokhina, 47, Russian actress, stomach cancer.
- Krzysztof Skubiszewski, 83, Polish politician, Minister of Foreign Affairs (1989–1993).
- Bobby A. Suarez, 67, Filipino film producer, director and screenwriter.
- Wahei Tatematsu, 62, Japanese novelist, multiple organ failure.
- Bill Utterback, 79, American illustrator and caricaturist.
- Isidoor Van De Wiele, 85, Belgian Olympic sprinter.

=== 9 ===
- Abdul Karim Amu, 76, Nigerian sprinter.
- Chaskel Besser, 86, Polish-born American rabbi.
- John D. Butler, 94, American politician, mayor of San Diego (1951–1955), natural causes.
- Davy Coenen, 29, Belgian mountain biker, brain tumor.
- Alfred Gregory, 96, British mountain climber and photojournalist.
- Phil Harris, 53, American fisherman, reality television participant (Deadliest Catch), stroke.
- Jacques Hétu, 71, Canadian composer, lung cancer.
- Juris Kalniņš, 71, Latvian basketball player.
- Albert Kligman, 93, American dermatologist, inventor of Retin-A, heart attack.
- Walter Frederick Morrison, 90, American inventor, designer of the frisbee.
- Francine I. Neff, 84, American politician, Treasurer of the United States (1974–1977), heart failure.
- Iza Orjonikidze, 71, Georgian writer and politician, MP (1992–1995), after long illness.
- Hastings Shade, 68, American deputy tribal chief of the Cherokee Nation (1999–2003).
- David W. Slater, 88, Canadian economist, civil servant and President of York University (1970–1973).
- Patricia Travers, 82, American violinist, cancer.
- Malcolm Vaughan, 80, British singer.
- Robert Shaw Sturgis Whitman, 94, American Episcopalian priest.

=== 10 ===
- Yosef Azran, 69, Israeli rabbi and politician, member of the Knesset (1988–1996), liver failure.
- Jack Bownass, 79, Canadian ice hockey player (Montreal Canadiens, New York Rangers).
- Carl Braun, 82, American basketball player (New York Knicks), natural causes.
- Armando Falcão, 90, Brazilian politician, Justice Minister (1974–1979), pneumonia.
- Gabriela Konevska-Trajkovska, 38, Macedonian politician, Deputy Prime Minister (2006–2008), after long illness.
- Judith Paige Mitchell, 77, American television writer (The Client), cancer.
- Michael Palme, 66, German sportswriter and host.
- Orlando Peçanha, 74, Brazilian footballer, heart attack.
- Girish Puthenchery, 48, Indian Malayalam lyricist and screenwriter, brain haemorrhage.
- K. N. Raj, 85, Indian economist, after long illness.
- Nelis J. Saunders, 88, American politician.
- Fred Schaus, 84, American basketball player and coach (Los Angeles Lakers).
- Enn Soosaar, 72, Estonian translator, literary critic and publicist.
- José Joaquín Trejos Fernández, 93, Costa Rican President (1966–1970), natural causes.
- David Tyacke, 94, British Army general.
- Eduard Vinokurov, 67, Russian Olympic fencer (1968, 1972, 1976).
- Frederick C. Weyand, 93, American army general, natural causes.
- Charlie Wilson, 76, American politician, U.S. Representative (1973–1997), subject of the book and movie Charlie Wilson's War, pulmonary arrest.
- H. V. F. Winstone, 83, British writer and journalist, lung cancer.

=== 11 ===
- Irina Arkhipova, 85, Russian mezzo-soprano singer, People's Artist of the USSR, cardiac arrest.
- Shahid Azmi, 32, Indian lawyer, shot.
- Jabez Bryce, 75, Tongan-born Anglican prelate, archbishop of Polynesia (since 1975), first Pacific Islander Anglican bishop.
- Iain Burgess, 56, British-born American punk rock record producer, pulmonary embolism.
- Jennifer Daugherty, 30, American torture murder victim.
- Pio Filippani Ronconi, 89, Italian orientalist.
- Walther Fröstell, 96, Swedish Olympic shooter.
- Brian Godfrey, 69, Welsh footballer, leukaemia.
- Heward Grafftey, 81, Canadian politician, MP for Brome—Missisquoi, Parkinson's disease (1958–1968, 1972–1980).
- Arthur H. Hayes Jr., 76, American public official, Commissioner of the Food and Drug Administration (1981–1983), leukemia.
- Mona Hofland, 80, Norwegian actress, after long illness.
- Bo Holmberg, 67, Swedish governor, widower of Anna Lindh.
- Umetsugu Inoue, 86, Japanese film director, cerebral hemorrhage.
- Robert Long, 77, New Zealand cricketer.
- Alexander McQueen, 40, British fashion designer, suicide by hanging.
- Caroline McWilliams, 64, American actress (Benson, Guiding Light, Mermaids), multiple myeloma.
- Paul Rebillot, 78, American psychotherapist, respiratory failure.
- E.H. Roelfzema, 62, Dutch writer, artist, poet, and musician.
- David Severn, 91, British author.
- Yury Sevidov, 68, Russian footballer, Soviet Top League highest goal scorer (1962).
- Gladys Skillett, 91, British nurse, first Guernsey wartime deportee to give birth in captivity.
- Daryle Smith, 46, American football player (Dallas Cowboys).
- Duncan Tanner, 51, British historian.
- Colin Ward, 85, British anarchist writer.

=== 12 ===
- Juan Pedro Amestoy, 84, Uruguayan accountant, politician and ambassador.
- Petar Borota, 56, Serbian footballer (Partizan Belgrade and Chelsea), after long illness.
- Maria Ragland Davis, 52, American biologist, shot.
- Lisa Daniels, 79, British actress.
- Ken Emerson, 82, Australian cartoonist (The Warrumbunglers).
- Jerry Fahr, 85, American baseball player.
- Gino Gardassanich, 87, Italian-born American football player.
- Chhaya Ghosh, 69, Indian politician.
- Sheldon Gilgore, 77, American physician, president of Pfizer (1971–1986) and Searle (1986–1995), pancreatic cancer.
- Jake Hanna, 78, American jazz drummer, blood disease.
- Adriel Johnson, 52, American biologist, shot.
- Athan Karras, 82, Greek-born American advocate of Greek dance, complications from coronary artery bypass surgery.
- Allan Kornblum, 71, American lawyer, counsel to the F.B.I., esophageal cancer.
- Werner Krämer, 70, German footballer.
- Nodar Kumaritashvili, 21, Georgian luger, national team member for the 2010 Winter Olympics, training accident.
- Miro Mihovilović, 94, Croatian Olympic water polo player.
- Luis Molowny, 84, Spanish footballer, heart attack.
- Leroy Nash, 94, American murderer, oldest death row inmate, natural causes.
- Alexis Pappas, 94, Greek-born Norwegian chemist.
- G. K. Podila, 52, Indian-born American biologist, shot.
- Willie Polland, 75, Scottish footballer (Heart of Midlothian).
- Saleban Olad Roble, 46, Somali government minister, injuries sustained in the 2009 Shamo Hotel bombing.
- Bernard Smith, 99, American sailboat designer, liver cancer.
- Grethe Sønck, 80, Danish actress and singer, natural causes.

=== 13 ===
- Muhammad al-Rabou'e, 34, Yemeni journalist, shot.
- Ralph G. Anderson, 86, American engineer and farmer.
- Lucille Clifton, 73, American poet, Poet Laureate of Maryland (1974–1985).
- Jock Ferguson, 64, Scottish-born Australian politician, Western Australian Legislative Council (since 2009), heart attack.
- Werner Forman, 89, Czech-born British photographer.
- Cy Grant, 90, Guyanese-born British actor and activist.
- Dale Hawkins, 73, American rockabilly musician, colorectal cancer.
- James D. Johnson, 85, American politician and jurist, Arkansas Supreme Court Justice (1959–1966), suicide by gunshot.
- Raymond Mason, 87, British sculptor.
- Robert J. Myers, 97, American politician, co-creator of the Social Security program, respiratory failure.
- Jamil Nasser, 77, American jazz musician, cardiac arrest.
- José María Pasquini Durán, 70, Argentine journalist, cardiac arrest.
- John Reed, 94, British actor.
- Red Rocha, 86, American basketball player and coach (Hawaii Rainbow Warriors).
- Roger Thatcher, 83, British statistician.
- Gareth Wigan, 78, British film studio executive (Star Wars, Chariots of Fire), after short illness.

=== 14 ===
- Ram Sarup Ankhi, 77, Indian writer, poet, and novelist.
- Audrey Collins, 94, British cricket player and administrator.
- John Downey, 89, British Royal Air Force officer.
- Doug Fieger, 57, American musician (The Knack), lung cancer.
- Dick Francis, 89, British jockey and novelist (Dead Cert).
- Helge Høva, 81, Norwegian politician.
- Amos Funk, 98, American farm preservationist.
- Linnart Mäll, 71, Estonian historian, orientalist, translator and politician, cancer.
- John Ruan, 96, American entrepreneur and philanthropist, Parkinson's disease.
- John Thorbjarnarson, 52, American conservationist and crocodile expert, malaria.
- Jerzy Turek, 76, Polish actor, leukemia.
- Zhang Yalin, 28, Chinese football player, lymphoma.

=== 15 ===
- W. H. Clatworthy, 94, American mathematician.
- Juan Carlos González, 85, Uruguayan football player.
- Ian Gray, 46, Australian football player, homicide by prohibited drug.
- Jeanne M. Holm, 88, American general, pneumonia.
- Bill Kajikawa, 97, American basketball coach (Arizona State Sun Devils).
- Dana Kirk, 74, American basketball coach (Memphis Tigers), heart attack.
- Rigmor Mydtskov, 84, Danish court photographer.
- Fred Peacock, 93, Canadian politician.
- Aníbal Portillo, 95, Salvadoran military officer, head of state (1961–1962).
- Sylvia Pressler, 75, American jurist, lymphoma.
- Alfred Surratt, 87, American baseball player (Kansas City Monarchs), co-founder of the Negro Leagues Baseball Museum.
- Art Van Damme, 89, American jazz musician and accordionist, pneumonia.
- George Waring, 84, British actor (Coronation Street), cancer.
- Claud William Wright, 93, British civil servant and scientific expert.

=== 16 ===
- Jim Bibby, 65, American baseball player (Pittsburgh Pirates), bone cancer.
- John Davis Chandler, 73, American actor (Adventures in Babysitting, The Outlaw Josey Wales).
- William E. Gordon, 92, American inventor, designer of the Arecibo Radio Telescope, natural causes.
- Martin Grossman, 45, American convicted murderer, execution by lethal injection.
- Jim Harmon, 76, American science fiction writer, heart attack.
- Ronald Howes, 83, American inventor, designer of Easy-Bake Oven.
- Andrew Koenig, 41, American actor (Growing Pains), suicide by hanging.
- Ino Kolbe, 95, German Esperanto expert.
- Ian Roderick Macneil, 80, American-born lawyer and Scottish clan chief.
- Mike Pittilo, 55, British biologist and educator, Principal of Robert Gordon University.
- Wan Chi Keung, 53, Hong Kong footballer, actor, and businessman, nasopharyngeal carcinoma.
- Jim Waugh, 76, American baseball player.
- Nujabes, 36, Japanese song maker and producer

=== 17 ===
- Roger-Émile Aubry, 86, Swiss-born Bolivian Roman Catholic prelate, Vicar Apostolic of Reyes (1973–1999).
- Chaturvedi Badrinath, 76, Indian officer and author.
- Lottie Beck, 81, American baseball player (AAGPBL)
- Arnold Beichman, 96, American writer and journalist.
- Bjørn Benkow, 70, Norwegian journalist.
- Giulio de Florian, 74, Italian Olympic cross-country skier.
- Makoto Fujita, 76, Japanese actor and comedian, ruptured artery.
- Kathryn Grayson, 88, American actress and singer.
- Ruby Hunter, 54, Australian singer and musician, heart attack.
- Abdulkhakim Ismailov, 93, Russian Red Army soldier, World War II hero, natural causes.
- David Lelei, 38, Kenyan middle distance runner, traffic collision.
- Ignatius P. Lobo, 90, Indian Roman Catholic prelate, Bishop of Belgaum (1967–1994).
- Martha Mercader, 83, Argentine politician and writer.
- Hans Ørberg, 89, Danish linguist.
- Witold Skaruch, 80, Polish actor.
- Luigi Ulivelli, 74, Italian Olympic athlete.

=== 18 ===
- John Babcock, 109, Canadian soldier, Canada's last surviving World War I veteran.
- Erwin Bachmann, 88, German Waffen-SS officer.
- Asta Backman, 93, Finnish actress.
- Bob Chakales, 82, American baseball player (Cleveland Indians).
- Barton Childs, 93, American physician and geneticist, complications of lung cancer.
- Amlan Datta, 85, Indian economist and teacher.
- Alan Gordon, 65, Scottish football player, cancer.
- Fernando Krahn, 75, Chilean plastic artist and illustrator.
- Emilio Lavazza, 78, Italian businessman, President of Lavazza Coffee (1979–2008).
- Nirmal Pandey, 48, Indian actor, heart attack.
- Richard Proulx, 72, American choral conductor and composer.
- Ariel Ramírez, 88, Argentine composer and pianist, pneumonia.

=== 19 ===
- George Cisar, 99, American baseball player (Brooklyn Dodgers).
- Daddy, 16, American Pit Bull Terrier, appeared with owner Cesar Millan in Dog Whisperer, euthanized due to cancer.
- Jamie Gillis, 66, American pornographic film actor, melanoma.
- Bruno Gironcoli, 73, Austrian sculptor, after long illness.
- Lionel Jeffries, 83, British film actor, screenwriter and director.
- Rudy Larriva, 94, American animator and animation director (Looney Tunes, The Bugs Bunny/Road Runner Show).
- Rafael Muñoz Núñez, 85, Mexican Roman Catholic prelate, Bishop of Zacatecas (1972–1984) and Aguascalientes (1984–1998).
- Elli Parvo, 95, Italian film actress.
- Giovanni Pettenella, 66, Italian Olympic cyclist.
- Walter Plowright, 86, British veterinary scientist.
- Laura Spurr, 64, American chairwoman of the Nottawaseppi Huron Band of Potawatomi since 2003, heart attack.
- Bull Verweij, 100, Dutch businessman, co-founder of Radio Veronica.
- Mladen Veža, 94, Croatian painter.

=== 20 ===
- Chandan Mal Baid, 88, Indian politician.
- Ghantasala Balaramayya, 78, Indian producer, director and actor.
- Bobby Cox, 76, Scottish footballer (Dundee).
- Georges Charachidzé, 80, French scholar of the Caucasian cultures.
- Juanita Goggins, 75, American politician, first black woman in South Carolina Legislature, hypothermia. (estimated date of death)
- Linda Grover, 76, American peace activist, founder of Global Family Day, uterine and ovarian cancer.
- Alexander Haig, 85, American politician and diplomat, Secretary of State (1981–1982), complications from an infection.
- Sam Hamilton, 54, American public official, Director of U.S. Fish and Wildlife Service since 2009, heart attack.
- Sandy Kenyon, 87, American character and voice actor (The Twilight Zone, Here Comes Garfield).
- Henry Kučera, 85, Czech-born American linguist.
- Niall McCrudden, 45, Irish optician and socialite.
- Padmanabham, 78, Indian actor, heart attack.
- Jason Wood, 38, British comedian and reality television contestant (Strictly Come Dancing).

=== 21 ===
- Seth G. Atwood, 92, American industrialist, community leader, and horological collector.
- Bob Doe, 89, British airman, Royal Air Force flying ace.
- Jacek Karpiński, 83, Polish computer scientist.
- Veini Kontinen, 82, Finnish Olympic skier.
- Vladimir Motyl, 82, Russian film director and scenarist, cervical fractures and pneumonia.
- Albader Parad, Filipino militant (Abu Sayyaf), shot.
- Vesa Pulliainen, 52, Finnish Olympic footballer.
- Casimir Johannes, Prince of Sayn-Wittgenstein-Berleburg, 93, German nobleman, businessman and politician.
- William E. Skillend, 83, British scholar of Korean language.
- George Strickland, 84, American baseball player (Pittsburgh Pirates, Cleveland Indians).
- James Wieghart, 76, American newspaper editor (New York Daily News), pneumonia.

=== 22 ===
- Juan Ángel Belda Dardiñá, 83, Spanish Roman Catholic prelate, Bishop of Jaca (1978–1983) and León (1983–1987).
- Michael J. Bradley, 76, British diplomat, Governor of the Turks and Caicos Islands (1987–1993).
- Robert Carter, 82, American priest and gay rights activist, a founder of the National Gay and Lesbian Task Force.
- Fred Chaffart, 74, Belgian businessperson.
- Henry Cosgrove, 87, Australian judge, Judge of the Supreme Court of Tasmania (1977–1988).
- Robin Davies, 56, British actor, lung cancer.
- Hillar Eller, 70, Estonian politician, former chairman of the Estonian Left Party (1995–1996).
- Eugene Lambert, 82, Irish puppeteer and ventriloquist (Wanderly Wagon).
- Nelly Landry, 93, Belgian-born French tennis player.
- Rozy Munir, 67, Indonesian diplomat, ambassador to Qatar, liver cancer.
- Menachem Porush, 93, Israeli politician, Member of Knesset (1959–1975, 1977–1994).
- Bobby Smith, 56, Scottish footballer, cancer.
- Charles Stenvig, 82, American politician, Mayor of Minneapolis (1969–1973, 1975–1977).
- Mohammed Zaman, 44, Afghan political and military leader, victim of suicide bombing.

=== 23 ===
- John Hollings Addison, 80, Canadian politician and business executive.
- Vyacheslav Andreyuk, 64, Soviet Russian football player.
- Clarence R. Autery, 76, American general.
- Bill Burtenshaw, 84, British footballer.
- Michael Clancy, 60, Saint Helena politician and Governor (2004–2007), cancer.
- Mervyn Jones, 87, British journalist, biographer and novelist.
- Abune Zena Markos, 72, Ethiopian Archbishop, complications from pneumonia.
- Wyn Morris, 81, British conductor.
- Gerhardt Neef, 63, German footballer (Rangers), throat cancer.
- Henri Salmide, 90, German World War II naval officer, saved Bordeaux port from destruction.
- Mosi Tatupu, 54, American football player (New England Patriots).
- Derek Vanlint, 78, British-born Canadian cinematographer (Alien), short illness.
- Orlando Zapata, 42, Cuban dissident, hunger strike.

=== 24 ===
- Antonio Alegre, 85, Argentine businessman, President of Boca Juniors (1985–1995).
- Delmo da Silva, 55, Brazilian Olympic sprinter.
- Ang It-hong, 82, Taiwanese singer, songwriter, composer and actor, pancreatic cancer.
- Dawn Brancheau, 40, American SeaWorld trainer, killer whale attack.
- Carlo Cicuttini, 63, Italian neo-fascist and terrorist.
- Jake Elder, 73, American NASCAR crew chief, natural causes.
- Howard George, 75, American Olympic wrestler.
- Richard Gruenwald, 93, Canadian politician, Alberta MLA for Lethbridge-West (1971–1975).
- Dagfin Huseby, 87, Norwegian Olympic wrestler.
- C. R. Johnson, 26, American newschool skier, skiing accident.
- Birgitta Lindqvist, 67, Swedish Olympic cross-country skier.
- Charles MacArthur, 89, Canadian politician, MLA for Inverness (1983–1998).

=== 25 ===
- Henry Barron, 81, Irish jurist, Supreme Court of Ireland (1997–2003), after short illness.
- Ernst Beyeler, 88, Swiss art collector.
- Barbara Bray, 85, British translator.
- Aaron Cohen, 79, American aerospace engineer, Director of Lyndon B. Johnson Space Center (1986–1993), after long illness.
- İhsan Doğramacı, 94, Turkish physician and academic, multiple organ dysfunction syndrome.
- Vladislav Galkin, 38, Russian actor, heart failure.
- Gheorghe Gaston Marin, 91, Romanian politician.
- Donald Merrifield, 81, American Jesuit, first president of Loyola Marymount University (1973–1984), heart attack.
- John Bernard McDowell, 88, American Roman Catholic prelate, Titular Bishop of Tamazuca (1966–1996).
- Oscar Ravina, 79, Polish-born American violinist.
- David Soyer, 87, American cellist (Guarneri Quartet).
- Efren Torres, 66, Mexican former world flyweight champion boxer, heart attack.
- Ali Tounsi, 76, Algerian police official, Chief of National Police, shot.
- Tuomo Tuormaa, 83, Finnish Olympic sprint canoer.
- Ahmet Vardar, 73, Turkish journalist and writer, pancreatic cancer.
- Frank Williams, 73, American architect (Trump Palace, Four Seasons Hotel New York), esophageal cancer.

=== 26 ===
- María Elisa Álvarez Obaya, 76, Spanish pharmacist.
- Louis Fabian Bachrach Jr., 92, American political photographer (Bachrach Studios).
- Violet Barclay, 87, American comic book artist.
- Tom Bass, 93, Australian sculptor.
- Barry Bowen, 64, Belizean bottling magnate and politician, plane crash.
- Francisco Cabrera Santos, 63, Venezuelan politician, mayor of Valencia, Carabobo.
- Bernard Coutaz, 87, French music publisher, founder of Harmonia Mundi.
- Richard Devon, 83, American character actor (Lassie), vascular disease.
- Gai Eaton, 89, Swiss-born British diplomat and author.
- Andrew Jaffe, 71, American journalist (Adweek), revived the Clio Awards, multiple myeloma.
- Ivaylo Kirov, 63, Bulgarian Olympic basketball player.
- Robert McCall, 90, American artist, heart failure.
- Nujabes, 36, Japanese hip hop composer (Samurai Champloo), traffic collision.
- Jacques J. Polak, 95, Dutch economist.
- Dave Sheasby, 69, British playwright, radio producer and dramatist.

=== 27 ===
- David Bankier, 63, German-born Israeli Holocaust scholar.
- Black Bear Island, app. 4, Irish Thoroughbred racehorse, euthanized.
- Larry Cassidy, 56, British bass guitarist and singer (Section 25).
- Charlie Crowe, 85, English footballer (Newcastle United), Alzheimer's disease.
- Frans De Blaes, 100, Belgian Olympic sprint canoer.
- Nanaji Deshmukh, 93, Indian social activist and politician, after long illness.
- Anna Fárová, 81, Czech photography historian and advocate, Charter 77 signatory.
- Madeleine Ferron, 87, Canadian author, Alzheimer's disease.
- Eli Fischer-Jørgensen, 99, Danish linguist and World War II resistance member.
- Rosemary Goldie, 94, Australian Roman Catholic theologian, Under-Secretary of the Pontifical Council for the Laity (1967–1976).
- Jonathan May, 51, American cellist and conductor, stroke.
- František Nedvěd, 59, Czech Olympic weightlifter.
- Hank Rosenstein, 89, American basketball player (New York Knicks), heart failure.
- Nathan Scott, 94, American film and television composer (Lassie, The Twilight Zone, Dragnet), natural causes.
- Oleg Stepanov, 70, Russian judoka, 1964 Olympic bronze medal winner.
- Wendy Toye, 92, British filmmaker.
- Roger Veeser, 90, Swiss Olympic athlete.

=== 28 ===
- David Amland, 79, American painter and art educator.
- Edward Athey, 88, American football, basketball and baseball player, baseball and basketball coach.
- Martin Benson, 91, British actor (The Omen, Cleopatra, Goldfinger).
- Adam Blacklaw, 72, Scottish footballer (Burnley).
- Gerald Butler, 79, British jurist and broadcaster, heart attack.
- Theodore Cross, 86, American publisher and civil rights activist, heart failure.
- Bohdan Ejmont, 82, Polish actor.
- Rose Gray, 71, British restaurateur (The River Café) and food writer, brain cancer.
- Gene Greytak, 84, American impressionist (Pope John Paul II), cancer.
- Chushiro Hayashi, 89, Japanese astrophysicist, pneumonia.
- Phillip Law, 97, Australian scientist and explorer (Australian Antarctic Territory).
- José Mindlin, 95, Brazilian businessman and bibliophile, multiple organ dysfunction syndrome.
- Carlos Montemayor, 62, Mexican writer, stomach cancer.
- Nikolay Surov, 62, Russian Olympic rower.
- Jorge Villamil, 80, Colombian composer, complications from diabetes.
- George Watt, 92, Australian rugby league footballer.
- Tom Wolk, 58, American bass guitarist (Hall & Oates), heart attack.
