= Abuna Yesehaq =

Eastern Orthodox Tewahedo bishop

His Eminence Abuna Yesehaq
- Archbishop of the Western Hemisphere and South Africa
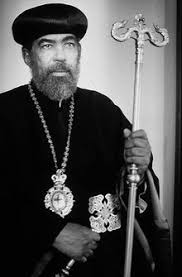
- Native name: አቡና ይስሐቕ
- Church: Ethiopian Orthodox Tewahedo

Personal details
- Born: Laike Maryam Mandefro; 1933 Adwa, Tigray
- Died: 29 December 2005 (aged 72) Newark, New Jersey
- Buried: Holy Trinity Ethiopian Orthodox Church, Kingston
- Denomination: Oriental Orthodoxy

Abuna Yesehaq (Ge'ez: አቡና ይስሐቕ; born Laike Maryam Mandefro; Ge'ez: ላይከ ማርያም ማንደፍሮ or Father Isaac (in English) 1933 - 29 December 2005), was an Ethiopian Orthodox prelate who served as Archbishop of the Western Hemisphere and South Africa beginning in 1979.

== Life ==
Laike was born to an Orthodox Christian family in Adwa, Tigray, attended Christian school in the monastery of Abba Garima where he became a monk, and joined the priesthood. He was one of the clerics fortunate enough to be tutored personally by Emperor Haile Selassie I, the titular head of the Church.

In October 1959, the Ethiopian Orthodox Church officially established a branch in New York; Abba Laike Mandefro, as he was then known, was sent there in 1963 and was given the task of finding a more suitable building for the Church, which was purchased in 1966. Mandefro then returned to Ethiopia to seek assistance for renovations; unfortunately the building was taken by the New York City authorities in his absence.

With the assistance of Emperor Haile Selassie, and the Ethiopian consulate in New York, Mandefro returned to New York City and purchased another site for the Church in 1969.

In 1970, he was sent to Jamaica where he began to minister specifically to the Rastafari community, at the official invitation of Rasta elders including Joseph Hibbert, who was in turn named as a "Spiritual Organizer" by Mandefro. Many government officials and others in Jamaica were deeply disappointed that Abba Mandefro defended the Rastafarians' faith on many occasions, and that he baptised thousands of them, pointedly refusing to denounce their faith in Haile Selassie as the returned Christ. On the other hand, a large number of other Rastas were likewise disappointed because he would not baptise them in the name of the Emperor, but only in the name of the Trinity. This however did not disturb those Rastas who viewed Christ and Haile Selassie as one and the same, and readily underwent baptism at the hands of this man who had been sent from Ethiopia by their living God. Only after the Marxist Derg Revolution that toppled Haile Selassie and appointed their own Patriarch over the Church, did the requirement become enforced for prospective baptisees in Jamaica to renounce his divinity and cut their dreadlocks.

Abba Mandefro also founded many Orthodox Churches throughout the Caribbean and elsewhere, and received the title "Archbishop Yesehaq of the Western Hemisphere and South Africa" in 1979. On 4 November 1980, he baptized world-renowned Rastafari musician Bob Marley, then suffering from terminal illness, into the church.

In the 1990s, a schism happened in the Orthodox Church when the new government of the EPRDF took power in Ethiopia and appointed their own Patriarch, Abuna Paulos. Abuna Yesehaq refused to recognise this political change, pointing out that according to the ancient Church canons, the Church leaders are to remain in office until they pass away, and cannot be dismissed or reappointed by any secular government. However, the New York City authorities took the side of the newly appointed Patriarch, and police interrupted a Church service on 9 August 1998 with guns drawn, using profanity, handcuffed children, and took possession of the Church in the name of Abuna Paulos.

In 2001, he and Archbishop Abune Zena Markos visited DSK Mariam Church in Washington, D.C. and elevated it to the rank of “Re’ese Adbarat” (head parochial church).

== Death ==
Abuna Yesehaq died on December 29, 2005, at the Newark Beth Israel Medical Centre, Newark, New Jersey, USA, at the age of 72. His death was announced by a spokesman for the archbishopric in Dallas, where he had recently moved his seat, and by Father Haile Malekot of the Ethiopian Orthodox Church in Kingston, Jamaica. The Archbishop was buried in Jamaica in accordance with his personal wishes to fulfill his mission, directed by Emperor Haile Selassie I, to establish the Ethiopian Orthodox Church in Jamaica, whose people had a love for Ethiopia and the Emperor.

His funeral at the National Arena in Jamaica on January 20, 2006, drew hundreds of mourners including Jamaican politicians, celebrities and members of the Rastafarian community, and was marked by lengthy rituals of liturgical drumming and chanting in the ancient Ethiopian languages of Ge'ez and Amharic.

His Mausoleum is in Kingston, Jamaica, at the Holy Trinity Ethiopian Orthodox Church on Maxfield Ave.

== As author ==
- Archbishop Yesehaq. The Ethiopian Tewahedo Church: An Integrally African Church. J.C. Winston Pub. Co., 1997. 244 pp. ISBN 9781555237394
