= Soosaar =

Family name

Soosaar is an Estonian surname, meaning "swamp (bog) island". It may refer to:

- Albert Soosaar (1906–1995), clergyman
- Eduard Soosaar (1911–1979), clergyman
- Enn Soosaar (1937–2010), translator, critic, columnist and publicist
- Kaia Soosaar (born 1993), long jumper
- Mark Soosaar (born 1946), film director and politician
- Marti Soosaar (born 1977), decathlete
- Martti Soosaar (1933–2017), journalist and writer
- Sven-Erik Soosaar (born 1973), linguist
