= Louis C. Wagner Jr. =

United States Army general (1932–2025)

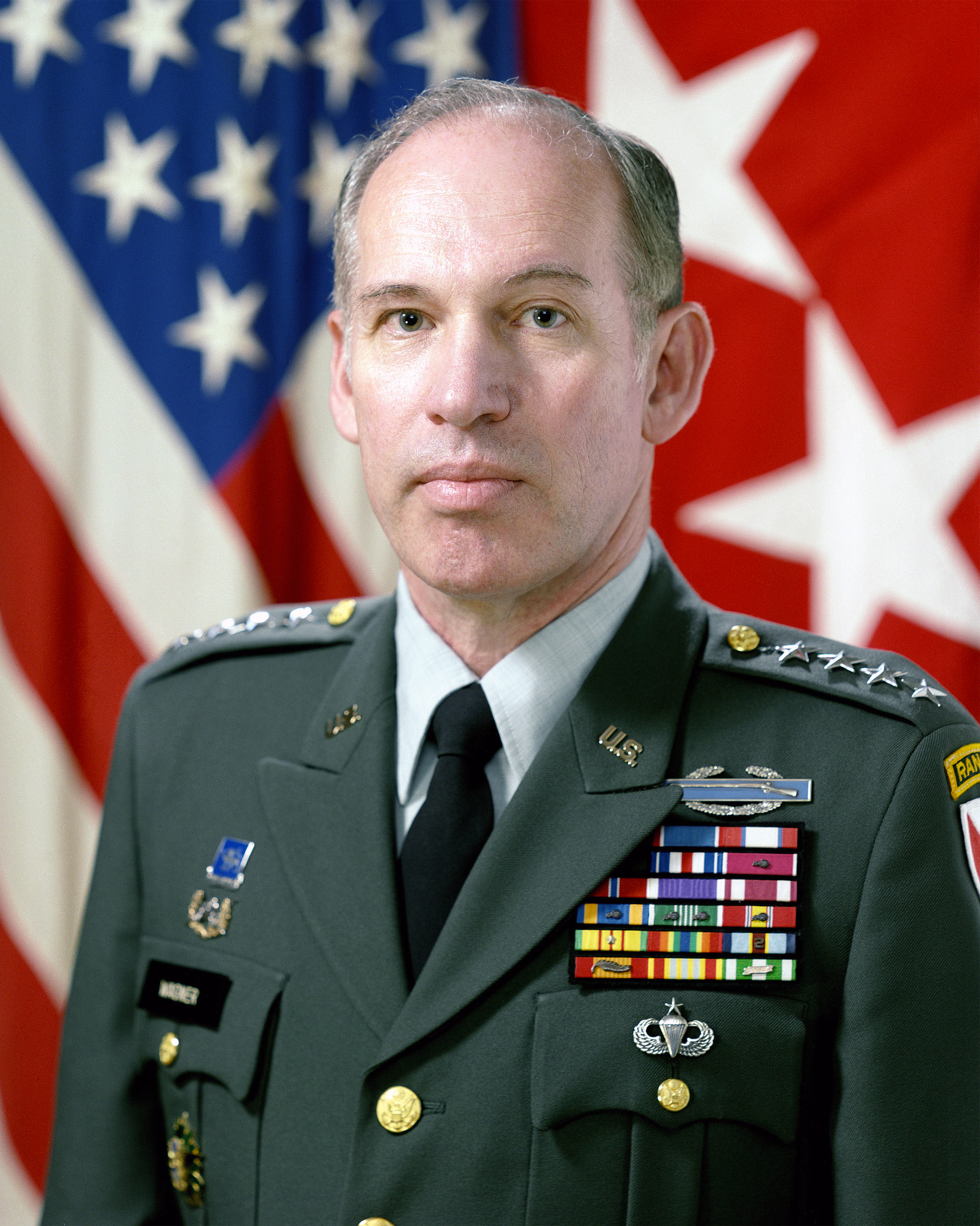
- General Louis Carson Wagner Jr.
- Born: 24 January 1932; Jackson, Missouri, U.S.
- Died: 24 January 2025 (aged 93); Fort Belvoir, Virginia, U.S.
- Burial place: Arlington National Cemetery, VA
- Military career
- Allegiance: United States
- Branch: United States Army
- Service years: 1954–1989
- Rank: General
- Commands: United States Army Materiel Command; 1st Brigade, 3rd Armored Division
- Conflicts: Vietnam War
- Awards: Distinguished Service Cross; Army Distinguished Service Medal (2); Silver Star; Legion of Merit (2); Bronze Star Medal; Purple Heart

Louis Carson Wagner Jr. (24 January 1932 – 24 January 2025) was a United States Army four-star general who served as commanding general, United States Army Materiel Command from 1987 to 1989.

== Military career ==
Wagner was born on 24 January 1932, in Jackson, Missouri. Upon graduation from the United States Military Academy in 1954, he was commissioned a second lieutenant of armor and awarded a Bachelor of Science degree. He also held a Master of Science degree in theoretical and applied mechanics from the University of Illinois. His military education includes completion of the United States Army Armor School, United States Army Command and General Staff College and Naval War College. He also completed the Airborne and Ranger Schools at the United States Army Infantry School.

Wagner held a wide variety of important command and staff positions, including his last assignment as commander of the United States Army Materiel Command from 13 April 1987 to 26 September 1989. Other key assignments included commanding general of the United States Army Armor Center, commandant, United States Army Armor School, Fort Knox, Kentucky, and assistant deputy chief of staff for operations and plans (force development), HQDA, Washington, D.C., From 31 July 1984, until assuming command of AMC, Wagner served as deputy chief of staff for research, development and acquisition, Department of the Army, Washington, D.C.

Wagner served in a variety of progressive assignments preparatory to becoming the commander of AMC. These included his initial assignment as platoon leader, company executive officer, company commander and assistant S-4, 11th Airborne Division (later reorganized and reflagged as the 24th Infantry Division; separate lineage), Fort Campbell, Kentucky and United States Army Europe, followed by assignment as a troop commander in the 6th Armored Cavalry Regiment, Fort Knox, Kentucky. He instructed at the United States Military Academy, West Point, New York, for three years, then was assigned to the Military Assistance Command, Vietnam.

Wagner served as a test officer and chief, Armor Test Division at the United States Army Arctic Test Center, Fort Greely, Alaska, for two years, followed by assignment as commander of a light airborne armor battalion at Fort Riley, Kansas, and Fort Bragg, North Carolina. After attending the Naval War College, he returned to Vietnam as an infantry and armor advisor.

Wagner next became a staff officer in the Weapons Systems Analysis Directorate in the Office, Assistant Vice Chief of Staff, United States Army, followed by assignment as the executive, Materiel Programs Directorate. He was then assigned as deputy director of materiel programs in the Office of the Assistant Vice Chief of Staff, United States Army, followed by assignment as the executive, Materiel Programs Directorate. He then was assigned as deputy director of materiel programs in the Office of the Chief of Staff, United States Army and, subsequently, special assistant for the Army Materiel Acquisition Review Committee in the same office.

In November 1974, Wagner became the commander of the 1st Brigade, 3rd Armored Division in Germany. After promotion to general officer, he was assigned as the deputy director, combat support systems, Office of the Deputy Chief of Staff (Research, Development and Acquisition), United States Army, Washington, D.C.

During his army career, Wagner received the following awards and decorations: Distinguished Service Cross, two awards of the Army Distinguished Service Medal, Silver Star, two awards of the Legion of Merit, Bronze Star Medal, Purple Heart, Meritorious Service Medal, two awards of the Air Medal, three awards of the Army Commendation Medal, Combat Infantryman Badge, Senior Parachutist Badge, Ranger Tab, and various foreign decorations. Wagner retired from the army in September 1989. Wagner died on his 93rd birthday, 24 January 2025.
