= William G. T. Tuttle Jr. =

United States Army general (1935–2020)

William G.T. Tuttle Jr.
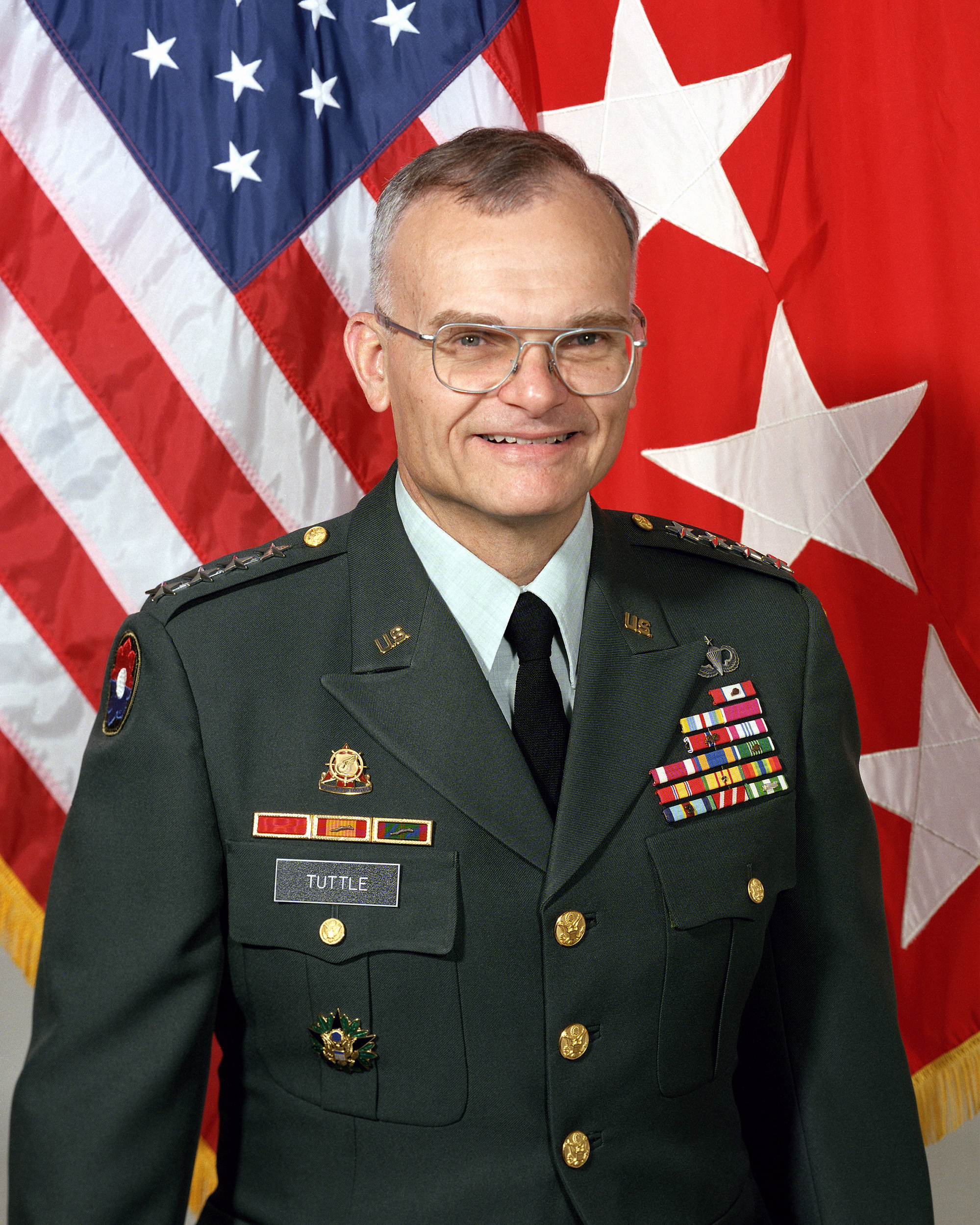
- General William G.T. Tuttle Jr.
- Born: 26 November 1935; Portsmouth, Virginia, US
- Died: 9 November 2020 (aged 84); Fairfax, Virginia, US
- Military career
- Allegiance: United States
- Branch: United States Army
- Service years: 1958–1992
- Rank: General
- Commands: United States Army Materiel Command; United States Army Operational Test and Evaluation Agency; United States Army Logistics Center; 503rd Supply and Transport Battalion
- Conflicts: Vietnam War
- Awards: Defense Distinguished Service Medal; Army Distinguished Service Medal (3); Navy Distinguished Service Medal; Air Force Distinguished Service Medal; Defense Superior Service Medal; Legion of Merit; Bronze Star Medal (3)

General William Gilbert Townsend Tuttle Jr. (26 November 1935 – 9 November 2020) was a United States Army four-star general who served as Commanding General, United States Army Materiel Command from 1989 to 1992.

== Military career ==
Tuttle was born in Portsmouth, Virginia, on 26 November 1935. Upon graduation with a baccalaureate in engineering from the United States Military Academy in 1958, he was commissioned a second lieutenant of infantry; he later earned a master's degree in business administration from Harvard. His military education includes the Basic Officer Course at the Infantry School, the Transportation Basic and Advanced Officer Courses, and attendance at the Armed Forces Staff College and United States Army War College.

Following graduate school, Tuttle commanded the 584th Transportation Detachment (Intelligence) and later served as the transportation plans officer at Headquarters, Eighth United States Army, South Korea. In 1965, he joined the Department of Social Sciences at the United States Military Academy teaching economics and government. He also served a summer period as a strategic mobility analyst in the Office of the Assistant Secretary of Defense (Systems Analysis) and returned to West Point as an assistant professor of social sciences, where he directed the Economics of National Security course. Upon completing his tour at West Point in June 1968, he was assigned respectively as executive officer of the 9th Supply and Transport Battalion and 9th Infantry Division transportation officer in South Vietnam.

In July 1969, Tuttle attended the Armed Forces Staff College, Norfolk, Virginia, and in February 1970 was assigned to the Department of the Army, serving first as a military programs staff officer in the Directorate of Manpower and Forces of the Assistant Chief of Staff for Force Development, where he programmed the major portion of the army's post-Vietnam reduction as well as the withdrawal of the 7th Infantry Division from South Korea. In February 1971, he joined the Office of the Assistant Vice Chief of Staff as the logistics analyst in the Office of the Coordinator of Army Studies. In the latter part of this tour, he helped develop the concept for the Army's 1973 reorganization, which created the United States Army Training and Doctrine Command (TRADOC) and United States Army Forces Command.

Assigned to Europe in 1972, Tuttle was assistant chief of staff, logistics, 3rd Armored Division, and later commanded that division's 503rd Supply and Transport Battalion. He then attended the War College and wrote a chapter of the War College's text, Army Command and Management. He served consecutively as Chief of Logistics, Division Restructuring Study, and as Chief of Personnel and Logistics Systems Division in the Office of the deputy chief of staff for Combat Developments, TRADOC. He returned to Europe and served as commander, Division Support Command, 3rd Armored Division from October 1977 through July 1979. Promoted to brigadier general, he became the commanding general, Eastern Area Military Traffic Management Command, until March 1981.

Tuttle's next assignments included deputy commanding general for logistics, TRADOC, and commanding general, United States Army Logistics Center and Fort Lee; director of Force Management, Office of the deputy chief of staff for operations and plans, HQDA; chief of the Policy and Programs Branch, Policy Division, Supreme Headquarters Allied Powers Europe; and commanding general, United States Army Operational Test and Evaluation Agency. His career culminated in his assignment as commander, United States Army Materiel Command, from 27 September 1989 to 31 January 1992.

Awards and decorations Tuttle received include the Army Distinguished Service Medal (with two Oak Leaf Clusters), the Defense Superior Service Medal, the Legion of Merit, the Bronze Star Medal (with two Oak Leaf Clusters), the Defense Meritorious Service Medal and the Meritorious Service Medal. He also wore the Air Medal, the Army Commendation Medal (with Oak Leaf Cluster), the Gold Cross of Honor of the Federal Republic of Germany, the Senior Parachutist Badge and the Ranger Tab. In 1987 the City of Portsmouth, Virginia chose him as one of its "Notables." General Tuttle was selected in 1991 to be the Army's 45th Kermit Roosevelt Lecturer at the British Senior Service Schools. General Tuttle retired from the Army in 1992.

Tuttle continued to be involved with the Department of Defense as the board chairman of the Defense Acquisition University and a member of the LOGTECH Subject Matter Expert Board of the Institute for Defense and Business. In 2011 the First Annual General William G.T. Tuttle, Jr., USA (Ret.) Award for Business Acumen in Defense and Government (http://www.prnewswire.com/news-releases/the-first-annual-general-william-gt-tuttle-jr-usa-ret-award-for-business-acumen-in-defense-and-government-115269869.html) was awarded in his honor and Tuttle presided over the ceremony.

Tuttle died at his home on 9 November 2020, at the age of 84. He was interred at Arlington National Cemetery on 14 May 2021.
