= Jimmy D. Ross =

United States Army general

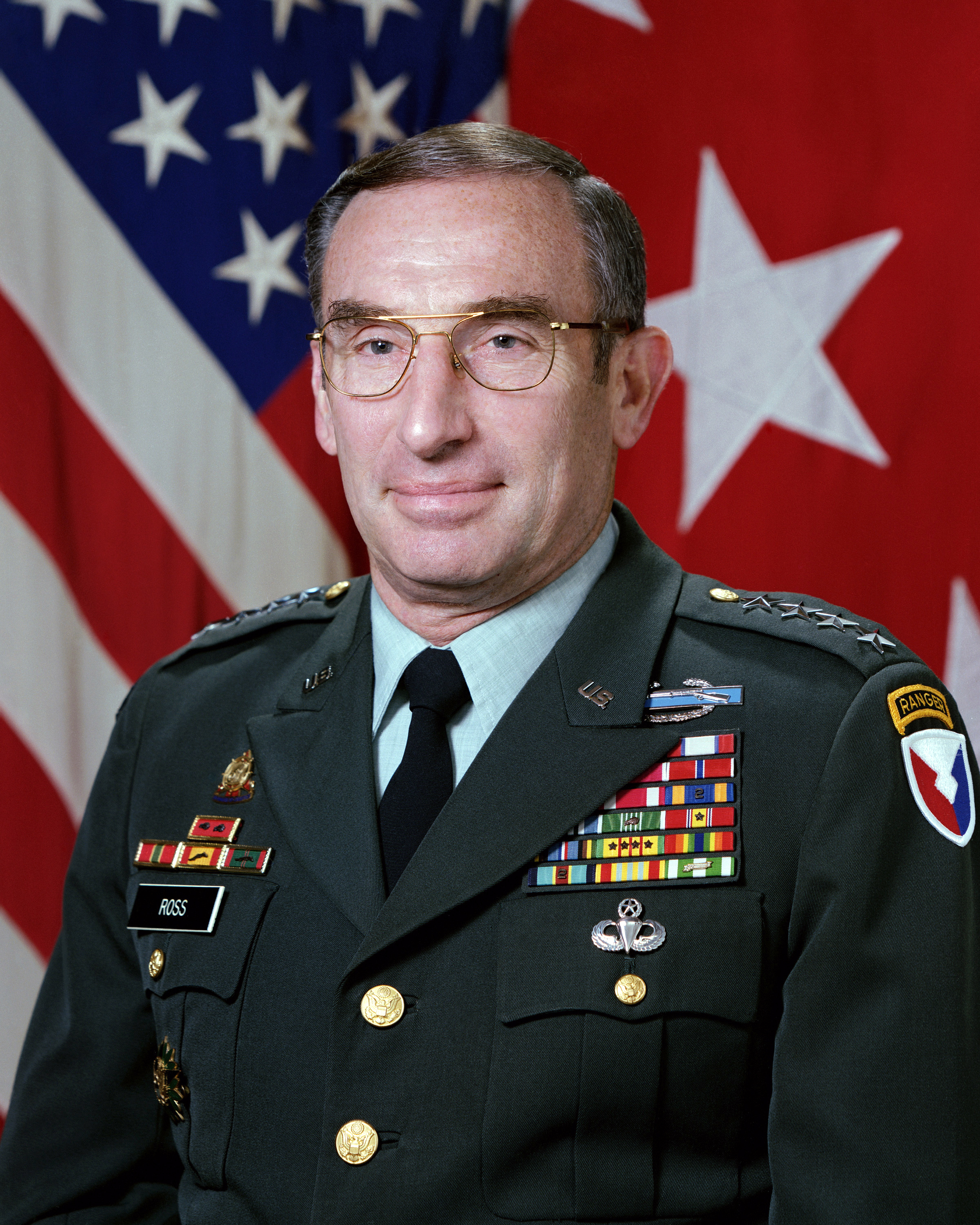
- General Jimmy Douglas Ross
- Born: 23 May 1936; Hosston, Louisiana
- Died: 2 May 2012 (aged 75); New Smyrna Beach, Florida
- Military career
- Allegiance: United States
- Branch: United States Army
- Service years: 1958–1994
- Rank: General
- Commands: United States Army Materiel Command; United States Army Depot System Command; 4th Transportation Brigade
- Conflicts: Vietnam War
- Awards: Army Distinguished Service Medal (2); Legion of Merit (2); Bronze Star Medal
- Other work: Board of Directors, Stanley, Inc. American Red Cross; Consultant, Cypress International; Board of Directors, VSE Corporation

General Jimmy Douglas Ross (23 May 1936 – 2 May 2012) was a United States Army four-star general and member of the board of two corporations.

== Education ==
Ross was born in Hosston, Louisiana. Upon completion of a Bachelor of Science degree in Education from Henderson State University in Arkadelphia, Arkansas in 1958, he was commissioned a second lieutenant in the Transportation Corps. He also holds a master's degree in business administration from Central Michigan University. His military education includes the Basic Officer Course at the United States Army Infantry School, the Transportation Advanced Officer Course, the United States Army Command and General Staff College, and the Industrial College of the Armed Forces.

== Army service ==
Ross's initial company grade assignments were with the Infantry and Transportation Corps units at Schofield Barracks, Hawaii; Thailand; Fort Eustis, Virginia; Fort Campbell, Kentucky; and Fort Bragg, North Carolina. In 1964, Ross served in Vietnam as an Infantry Battalion Advisor in the PBT Special Zone, III Corps.

From 1967 to 1969, Ross was assigned as a JTF-11 Staff Officer, United States Strike Command, MacDill Air Force Base, Florida. In 1969, Ross returned to Vietnam. During his second combat tour, he served as the S4 and later the S2/3 in the 101st Airborne Division Support Command; and then commanded the 10th Transportation Battalion at Cam Ranh Bay.

Upon his return to the United States, Ross was assigned to the Office of the Deputy Chief of Staff for Logistics at HQDA, in the Financial Resources and the Materiel Acquisition Directorates. He served as the Assistant Director of the Army Staff in the Office of the Chief of Staff, Army, from 1973 to 1974. His next assignment was as the Deputy Comptroller of Oakland Army Base, California, and later as the Commander of the Military Ocean Terminal, Bay Area.

In 1978, Ross transferred to Germany, where he commanded the 4th Transportation Brigade and 2nd Support Command, VII Corps. He returned to the Office of the Deputy Chief of Staff for Logistics, HQDA, as the Director for Transportation, Energy and Troop Support from 1982 to 1984.

Ross served as the Chief of Staff, United States Army Materiel Command, from 1984 to 1986 and the Commanding General of the United States Army Depot System Command, from 1986 to 1987. In June 1987, he was assigned as the Deputy Chief of Staff for Logistics, U.S. Army, where he served for four and a half years. Ross returned to AMC as commanding general from 1 February 1992 to 11 February 1994.

Ross's awards and decorations include the Army Distinguished Service Medal (with Oak Leaf Cluster), the Legion of Merit (with Oak Leaf Cluster), the Bronze Star Medal, the Meritorious Service Medal, two Air Medals, the Joint Service Commendation Medal and the Army Commendation Medal (with Oak Leaf Cluster). He has also been awarded the Combat Infantryman Badge, the Master Parachutist Badge, the Ranger Tab, and the Army Staff Identification Badge. General Ross retired from the Army in 1994.

== Post-army activities ==
From 2001, Ross was a member of the board of directors of Stanley, Inc., a consulting firm. He also served as an executive with the American Red Cross and as a consultant to Cypress International. He was a member of the board of directors of VSE Corporation.

== Personal ==
Ross married Patricia L. Cox (1 August 1935 – 17 June 2020) on 18 December 1955 in Arkadelphia, Arkansas while they were both still students in the Education program at Henderson State University. The couple had four children, six grandchildren and, as of 2020, four great-grandchildren.

Ross died of cancer in 2012. He was interred at Arlington National Cemetery on 22 June 2012. His wife was buried next to him on 1 December 2020. A son who died in infancy is also interred with the couple.
