= Ferdinand J. Chesarek =

United States Army general

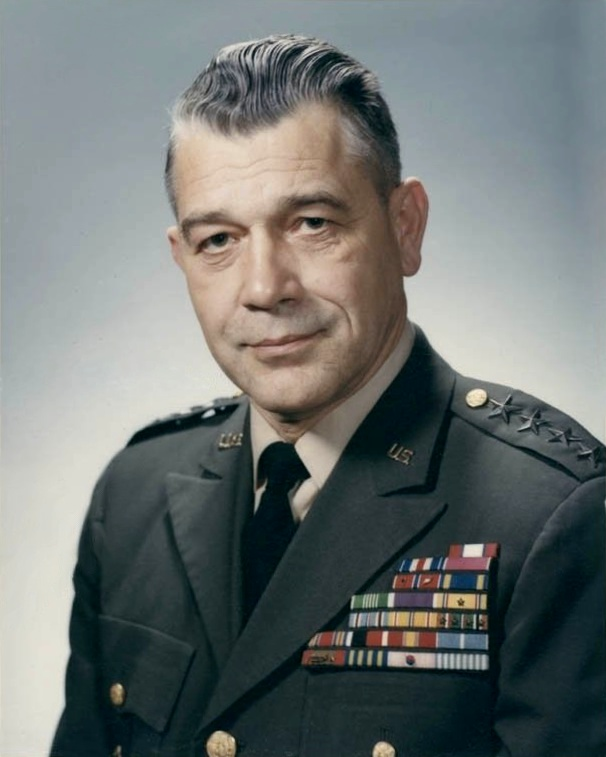
- Chesarek in the 1960s
- Born: 18 February 1914; Calumet, Michigan
- Died: 20 November 1993 (aged 79); Nashville, Tennessee
- Military career
- Allegiance: United States
- Branch: United States Army
- Service years: 1938–1970
- Rank: General
- Commands: United States Army Materiel Command; 4th Logistical Command; 28th Field Artillery Battalion
- Conflicts: World War II
- Awards: Army Distinguished Service Medal; Silver Star; Legion of Merit; Bronze Star Medal (2); Purple Heart

Ferdinand Joseph Chesarek (18 February 1914 – 20 November 1993) was a United States Army general.

== World War II ==
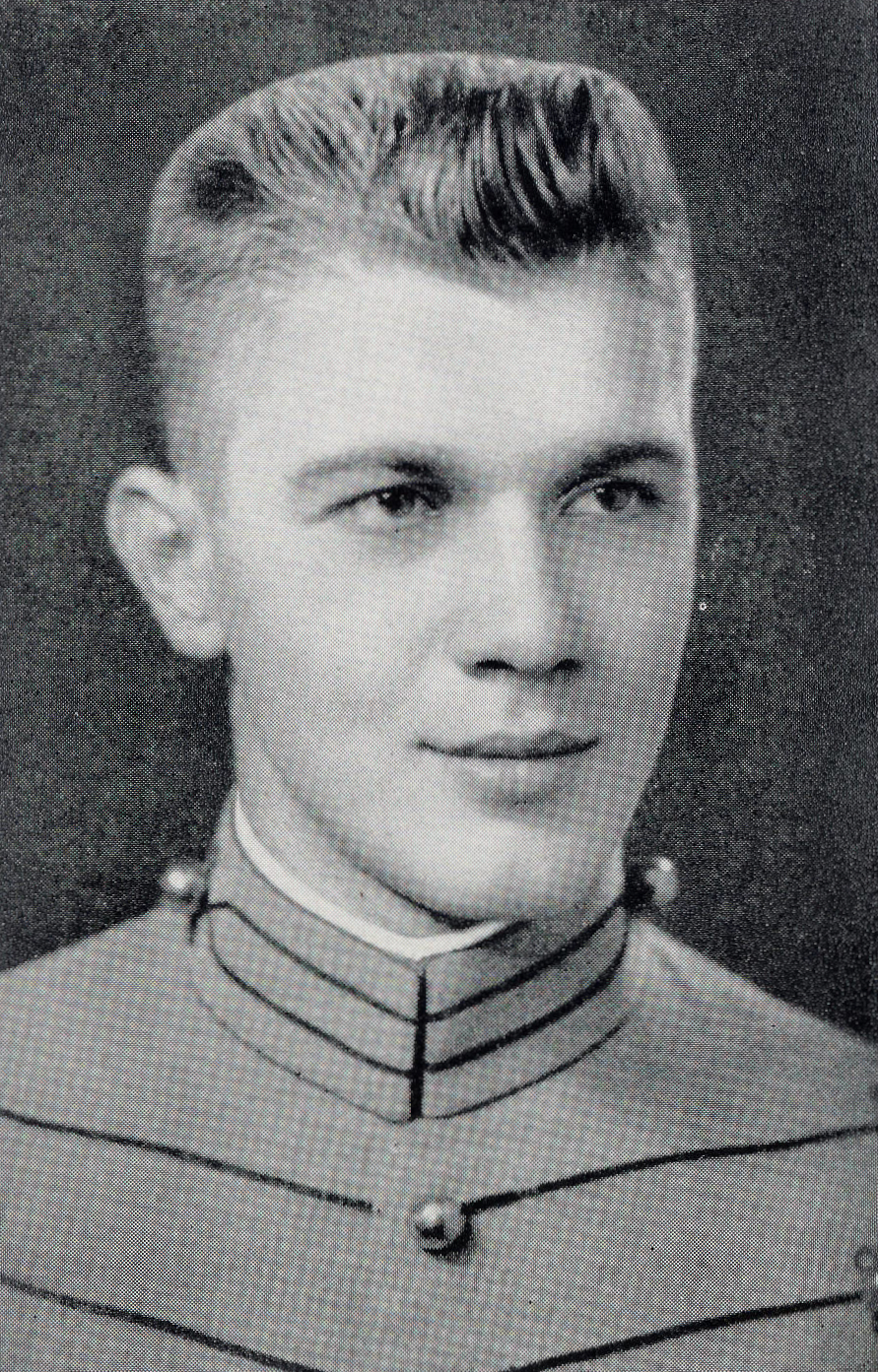
Chesarek as a United States Military Academy cadet c. 1938

Ferdinand Chesarek graduated from the United States Military Academy and was commissioned a second lieutenant in the field artillery in 1938. In November 1943, Chesarek went to the European Theater of Operations to become Commanding Officer of the 28th Field Artillery Battalion, 8th Infantry Division. He participated in the Normandy, Northern France, Rhineland, and Central Europe campaigns and was awarded the Silver Star, Bronze Star Medal with Oak Leaf Cluster, Air Medal, and Purple Heart. He also received the French Croix de Guerre with Palm and Star for his part in these campaigns.

Chesarek returned to the United States in July 1945 for detail to the War Department General Staff in Washington, D.C., where he served as a legislative officer in the Logistics Division and received the Army Commendation Medal. From June 1948 to April 1950, Chesarek attended Stanford University and received his master's degree in Business Administration. He returned to the Pentagon to serve as Assistant to the chairman, Munitions Board, until February 1953 when he entered the Armed Forces Staff College at Norfolk, Virginia.

== Korea ==
After graduation in July 1953, Chesarek went to Korea to serve with the Headquarters, Eighth United States Army. He was awarded the Legion of Merit for his work. In May 1954, he took command of the 5th Artillery Group, which consisted of six United States and four Korean artillery battalions. He later received the Order of Ulchi from the Republic of Korea.

In January 1955, Chesarek was assigned as Chief of the Military Personnel and Manpower Division, Office of the Deputy Chief of Staff for Logistics, until August 1955 when he entered the National War College. Following graduation in June 1956, he served as Military Assistant and Executive Officer to the Assistant Secretary of Defense for International Security Affairs. In addition, he acted as International Conference Coordinator for the Secretary of Defense and participated in twelve major international conferences as a Defense Member of the United States delegation. During this assignment, he attended the six-week Advanced Management Program at Harvard Business School.

== Chief of Staff ==
In August 1959, Chesarek became the Chief of Staff, United States Army Communications Zone, Europe. He went to Italy in July 1960 to be Chief of Staff of the United States Army Southern European Task Force and was awarded the Order of Merit of the Italian Republic by the Chief of Staff of the Italian Army. He returned to France in March 1961 for duty as Commanding General, 4th Logistical Command, and received the Legion of Honor from the French Government.

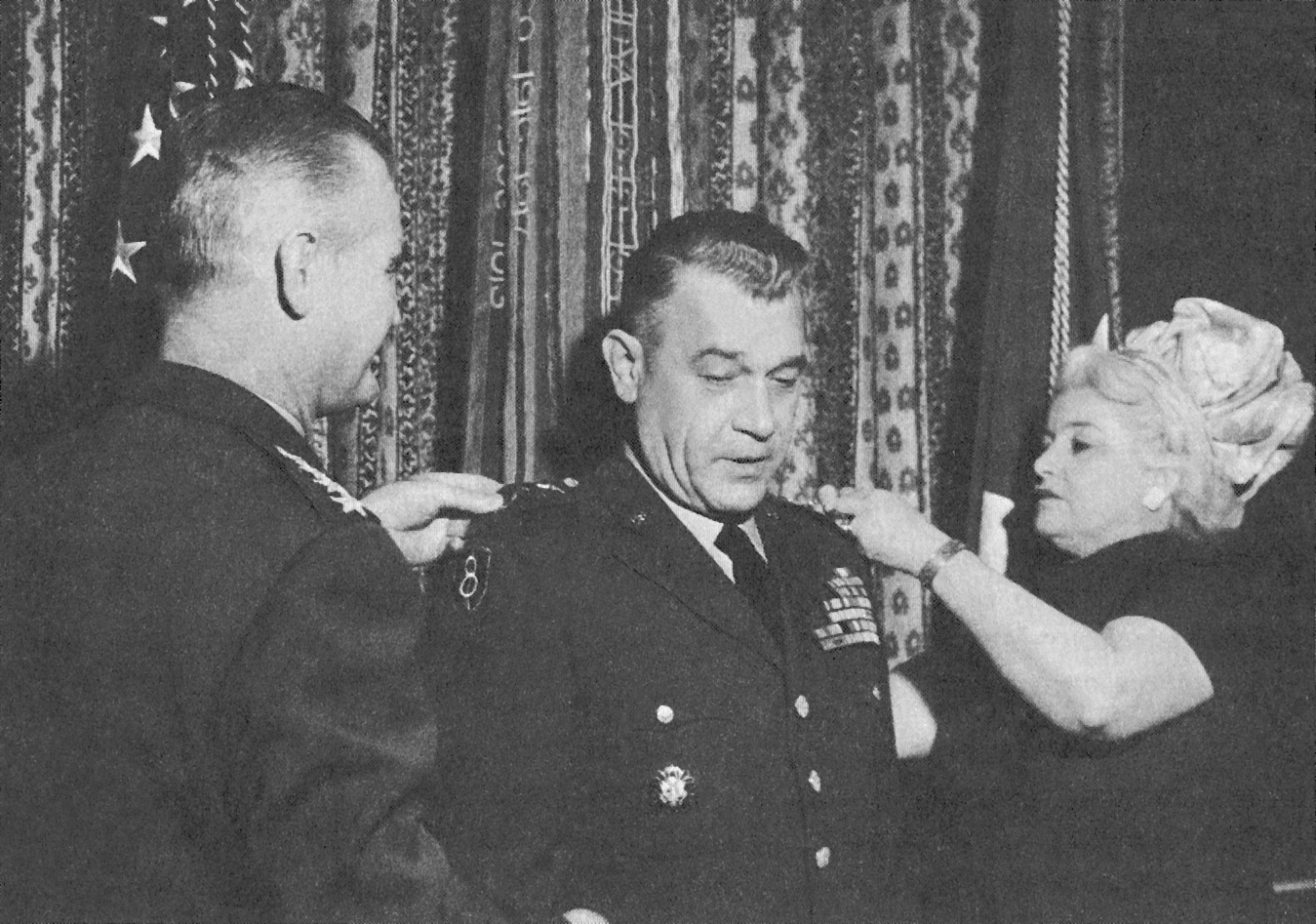
Receiving fourth star from Army Chief of Staff William C. Westmoreland and Mrs. Chesarek, 1969

In October 1962, Chesarek was assigned to the office of the deputy chief of staff for logistics, first as assistant deputy chief of staff for logistics (materiel readiness) and then, from August 1964, as assistant deputy chief of staff for logistics (programs). He was appointed Comptroller of the Army on 1 August 1966, and served in this assignment until 1 August 1967. Upon the reorganization of the Office of the Chief of Staff on 16 February 1967, he was designated the first occupant of the newly created position of assistant vice chief of staff from February 1967 to May 1968.

== United Kingdom speaking tour and promotion ==
One of the highlights of Chesarek's career was his tour of the United Kingdom in May 1968 as United States 1968 Kermit Roosevelt Lecturer, during which he addressed the students at many British military schools. On 8 July 1968, Chesarek was appointed Senior United States Army Member of the Military Staff Committee of the United Nations, in addition to his primary duty as Assistant Vice Chief of Staff. On 10 March 1969, he was promoted to full general as the second Commanding General, United States Army Materiel Command, where he served until retiring in October 1970. Chesarek died on 20 November 1993, in Nashville, Tennessee, of complications from open heart surgery.
