= Abune Zena Markos =

Archbishop of the Ethiopian Orthodox Tewahedo Church (1937–2010)

Abune Zena Markos (2 November 1937 – 13 February 2010) was an archbishop of the Ethiopian Orthodox Tewahedo Church.

== Early life ==
The parents of Abune Zena Markos were Mr. Begosew Wolde Tsadek and Mrs. Genet Wolde Giorgis. He was born on 2 November 1937, in Dega Melza, in the district of Ebenat, province of Gondar. Markos was a member of an extended family which helped build and support St. George's Church near St. Mary's of Melza Shumge.

== Education ==
According to the Holy Synod of Ethiopia, Markos started to learn the teachings of the Ethiopian Orthodox Tewahedo Church from early childhood, from instructors throughout Ethiopia. By the age of 12 he had completed the basic Ethiopic traditional scholarship, such as: Psalmody, Church hymnody, the office of deaconate, Horologium under the tutorship of Memhir Alemu of St. Mary's of Shumge.

He went to St. Mary of Birkuakua to master religious poetry, the climax of Ethiopic traditional scholarship. He also studied the ancient Ethiopic commentary of Sacred Scriptures and liturgical hymnody.

Zena Markos joined St. Hanna's Monastery in Debre Sina to learn the Divine Liturgy from scholar Memhir Abba Wolde Semaet.

Zena Markos was elected by Abune Theophilos, the second Patriarch of the Ethiopian Orthodox Tewahedo Church, and was sent to Greece for higher theological studies and advanced research. He completed his graduate studies with a degree of Master of Divinity.

== Ordinance, promotion and service ==
Upon completion of his studies, Zena Markos was ordained as a deacon by Abune Michael, the Archbishop of Gondar. Soon after, he joined the monastery of Debra Libanos.

He went to Zequala monastery where he became a monk with the blessings of Memhir Wolde Selassie. Eventually he was ordained as priest and served at Debre Libanos monastery. In addition, he also served as a priest and chief administrator in various monasteries and churches across the country, including Kulubi Saint Gabriel Church in the province of Harar. After finishing his graduate studies in Greece, the Ethiopian Orthodox Tewahedo Church assigned him to its monastery in Jerusalem. He was consecrated as a bishop on January 21, 1979, and later became the Archbishop of Wolega Diocese in [Western Ethiopia]. He served in Wolega for six years. From 1985 to 1991 he was elected twice as deputy Patriarch under Abune Tekle Haimanot, the third Patriarch of the Ethiopian Orthodox Tewahedo Church and also under Abune Merkorewos, the fourth Patriarch of the Ethiopian Orthodox Tewahedo Church.

In 2001, he and Archbishop Abuna Yesehaq visited DSK Mariam Church in Washington, D.C. and elevated it to the rank of “Re’ese Adbarat” (head parochial church).

== Life in exile ==
In 1991 the Ethiopian People's Revolutionary Democratic Front (EPRDF) took power and dethroned Patriarch Abune Merkorios. For the sake of the stability of the Church, Archbishop temporarily served as the chairperson of the Holy Synod of the Ethiopian Orthodox Church from 1991 to 1992. In 1992 the EPRDF named a Patriarch, disregarding the Church. Zena Markos went to Kenya, and then to the US, where he established his Bishopric See at Rese Adberat Mekane Birhan St. Gabriel Ethiopian Orthodox Tewahedo Monastery in Seattle, WA where he resided and served for over 16 years. Zena Markos extended his apostolic duties all over the world, most notably in Africa, Australia and North America. He was instrumental to the foundation of numerous churches in Kenya, Canada, Australia and the United States. Some of these are under the auspices of the Holy Synod in exile led by Abune Merkorewos, Patriarch of the Ethiopian Orthodox Tewahedo Church.

== Death ==
Abune Zena Markos died on Saturday 13 February 2010, in Seattle, Washington, at the age of 72.
