= Maria Ragland Davis =

American biologist

- Born: June 1, 1959; Detroit, Michigan, US
- Died: February 12, 2010 (aged 50); Huntsville, Alabama, US

Academic background
- Education: University of Michigan; North Carolina State University

Academic work
- Discipline: Molecular biology Plant genetics

Maria Ragland Davis (June 1, 1959 – February 12, 2010) was an American biologist and educator. She was associate professor of biology at the University of Alabama in Huntsville, where she studied molecular biology and plant genetics.

== Life and career ==
A native of Detroit, she received her undergraduate degree in chemical engineering from the University of Michigan and a master's degree in the same discipline from North Carolina State University. Following the receipt of her master's degree, Davis completed her doctorate in biochemistry and plant biology. Davis studied strawberries, looking at the genetic makeup of strains that were susceptible to fungal pathogens under cold stress and those that were not.

== Death ==
She was one of three faculty members killed in the 2010 University of Alabama in Huntsville shooting. She was 50 years old.

== Selected works ==
1. Cold induced Botrytis cinerea enolase (BcEnol-1) functions as a transcriptional regulator and is controlled by cAMP. Molecular Genetics and Genomics Volume 281, Number 2. Ajay K. Pandey, Preti Jain, Gopi K. Podila, Bettina Tudzynski and Maria R. Davis.
2. Campen, Hana; Davis, Maria R. (1993). "Isolation and characterization of chicken aortic endothelial cells". Journal of Tissue Culture Methods. 15 (4): 171–175. doi:10.1007/BF02388315.
3. Comparative Proteomic Analysis of Botrytis cinerea Secretome. J. Proteome Res., 2009, 8 (3), pgs. 1123–30, Punit Shah, James A. Atwood, III, Ron Orlando, Hind El Mubarek, Gopi K. Podila and Maria R. Davis
4. A First-Generation Whole Genome–Radiation Hybrid Map Spanning the Mouse Genome. Genome Res. 1997. 7: pgs. 1153–61. Linda C. McCarthy, Jonathan Terrett, Maria E. Davis, Catherine J. Knights, Angela L. Smith, Ricky Critcher, Karin Schmitt, Jim Hudson, Nigel K. Spurr, and Peter N. Goodfello
