= Juan del Campo (field hockey) =

Spanish field hockey player (1923–2010)

Juan del Campo Esteibar (1 February 1923 – 2 February 2010) was a Spanish field hockey player who competed in the 1948 Summer Olympics. He was born and died in San Sebastián.

Del Campo was a member of the Spanish field hockey team, which was eliminated in the group stage. He played all two matches as forward in the tournament.
