= Bill Utterback =

American cartoonist

Bill Utterback (1931-2010) was an American illustrator most widely known for his contributions to Playboy and The Second City's theatre in Chicago.

Utterback was born on January 5, 1931, in Arlington Heights, Illinois. Utterback attended the Chicago Academy of Fine Arts in the 1940s, and then The Art Center in Pasadena where he was influenced by teacher Joseph Henninger.

At the invitation of a friend, Utterback joined the design department of Playboy in the mid-sixties.[1] Utterback was asked to illustrate some caricatures for publication after an art director saw a birthday card Utterback had created for a fellow employee. This led to Bill's regular feature in “That Was the Year That Was” each April issue. After leaving Playboy, Utterback worked as a freelance illustrator from his home studio in Lisle, Illinois, servicing clients including The Second City until his death in 2010, and painted official portraits of Illinois Senator Pate Phillips which hung in the Illinois State Capitol building.

In later life, Utterback taught workshops at the DuPage Art League in Wheaton, Illinois, and sculpted a portrait likeness of Pate Phillips which was cast in bronze and unveiled in the DuPage County. Utterback died on February 8, 2010, as a result of pancreatic cancer, at 79 years of age.
