= Marjorie Murray =

British administrator

Marjorie Nellie, Lady Murray (née Culverwell) (3 October 1924 – 6 February 2010) was a British administrator and one of the last surviving witnesses of both the Nuremberg and Tokyo war crimes trials. She was married to Sir Donald Murray, who served as British ambassador to Libya from 1974 to 1976.

Lady Murray worked at GCHQ on weather translations. She learnt German from her father who had been a prisoner of war during World War I. She later transferred to Supreme Headquarters Allied Expeditionary Force in Grosvenor Square, London, where she was one of the few who knew the planned date of the D-Day landings. Following the liberation of Paris, she was transferred there, then later to Germany to work on the Nuremberg Trials.

Soon after returning from Germany, she was sent to Japan to work on the Tokyo trial. After she and her husband retired, they moved to Kent.

Lady Murray died on 6 February 2010.
