= Srinivas Rangaraj =

Indian cricketer (1932–2010)

Personal information
- Full name: Srinivas Venkatachar Rangaraj
- Born: 15 August 1932
- Died: 2 February 2010 (aged 77)
- Source: Cricinfo, 26 April 2020

Srinivas Rangaraj (15 August 1932 – 2 February 2010) was an Indian cricketer who played in sixteen first-class matches for Mysore between 1952 and 1961.
