= Dieter Klauß =

German field hockey player

Personal information
- Nationality: German
- Born: 16 September 1947 Magdeburg, Germany
- Died: 8 February 2010 (aged 62) Leipzig, Germany

Sport
- Sport: Field hockey

Dieter Klauß (16 September 1947 – 8 February 2010) was a German field hockey player. He competed in the men's tournament at the 1968 Summer Olympics.
