= Linda Grover =

American activist (1934–2010)

Linda Grover (January 28, 1934 – February 20, 2010) was an American peace activist, and the founder of the Global Family Day, previously known as OneDay.

== Early life and career ==
She was born in Nashua, New Hampshire into a military family. At the age of 15, she graduated from high school in Las Vegas, where she was named Helldorado Queen, winning the local beauty pageant in 1949.

She later worked for Rep. Sam Yorty, and later became clerk of the U.S. House Subcommittee on Indian affairs. Aged 22, she married a young Broadway actor and singer, Stanley Grover Nienstedt, when she moved to New York City. The couple had three children but eventually divorced. Her later marriage to John Porterfield also ended in divorce. For seven years, she battled with the city in order to stop a condemnation, eviction and demolition. She invited city officials and the news media to hear the reasons why twenty families wanted to buy the building and turn the apartments into co-ops. In 1970, she published a book about the effort, "The House Keepers", which was serialized in the New York Post.

She later found work in New York as a taxicab driver, restaurant reviewer and cook before she was hired to write for soap operas. She became the head writer for The Doctors, Search for Tomorrow and General Hospital, and co-wrote Looking Terrific in 1978, and August Celebration in 1993, on blue-green algae as a nutrient.

In 1988, she became a key organizer of southern Oregon's unsuccessful bid to host the 1988 Winter Olympics when she lived in Key West, Florida. For 11 years, she worked out in Capitol Hill apartment, collaborating with volunteers on how to make the next January 1 more peaceful. Grover wrote a utopian novel, Tree Island in 1995, on the topic and organized a 1998 meeting in Oregon's Cascade Mountains of 50 millennium groups. She returned to Washington in 1999 at the suggestion of the staff of Rep. Charles B. Rangel to lobby for a congressional resolution on her pet project.

In 2008, she traveled to China to represent the Global Family Day congressional caucus as she tried to get the world's most populous nation fired up about the holiday.

== Death ==
On February 20, 2010, Linda Grover died from uterine and ovarian cancer at the Washington Home and Community Hospices, aged 76.
