= Vesa Pulliainen =

Finnish footballer (1957–2010)

Personal information
- Date of birth: 8 May 1957
- Place of birth: Mikkeli, Finland
- Date of death: 21 February 2010 (aged 52)
- Place of death: Mikkeli, Finland
- Position: Midfielder

International career
Years	Team	Apps	(Gls)
- Finland

Vesa Pulliainen (8 May 1957 – 21 February 2010) was a Finnish footballer. He competed in the men's tournament at the 1980 Summer Olympics.
