= Martha Mercader =

Argentine politician (1926–2010)

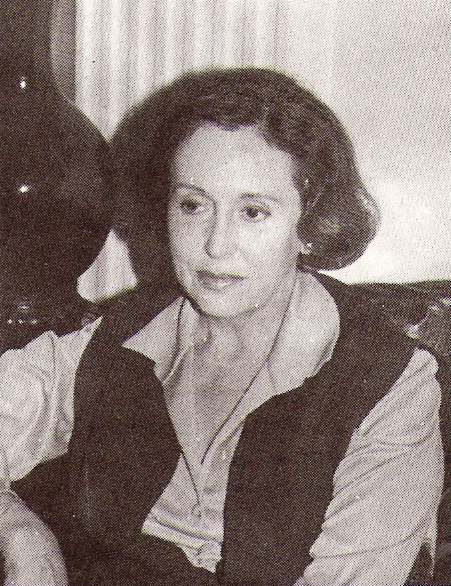
Martha Mercader

Martha Evelina Mercader (February 27, 1926 – February 17, 2010) was an Argentine politician and writer, known for novels, short stories, essays and children's books.

Mercader was born in La Plata, Argentina, in 1926. She died on February 17, 2010, in Buenos Aires at the age of 83.
