= Francisco Cabrera Santos =

Venezuelan mayor

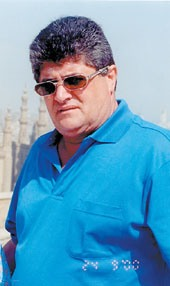
A photo of Francisco cabtera santos

Francisco Cabrera Santos (May 14, 1946 – February 26, 2010) was the Mayor of Valencia, Carabobo in Venezuela. He led the Communitarian Patriotic Consensus (CONPACO) party.

In 2006 he was one of the finalists for World Mayor.

He died on 26 February 2010.
