= William E. Skillend =

British Koreanist (1926–2010)

William E. Skillend (26 April 1926 – 21 February 2010) was the first British academic specializing in the Korean language, and the first professor of Korean at the School of Oriental and African Studies (SOAS) in London.

Skillend was born in Liverpool and went on to study Japanese at Christ's College, Cambridge, where he received a first-class degree and later completed a PhD. He became one of the generation of British orientalists who started as military translators, in his case at Bletchley Park.

Skillend was responsible for establishing the Association for Korean Studies in Europe (AKSE) in 1977.

== Works ==
- William E. Skillend, Kodae Sosol: A Survey of Korean Traditional Style Popular Novels (London: School of Oriental and African Studies, 1968).
