= Ignatius P. Lobo =

Catholic bishop (1919–2010)

- Bishop of Diocese of Belgaum (Emeritus)
- Church: Catholic Church
- See: Diocese of Belgaum
- In office: 1967–1994
- Predecessor: Fortunato da Veiga Coutinho
- Successor: Bernard Blasius Moras
- Previous post(s): Priest

Orders
- Ordination: 21 December 1947

Personal details
- Born: 27 April 1919; Siolim, British India
- Died: 17 February 2010 (aged 90)

Ignatius P. Lobo (27 April 1919 – 17 February 2010) was an Indian prelate of the Catholic Church. As of 2009, he was one of oldest Roman Catholic Bishops from India.

Lobo was born in Siolim, India and ordained priest 21 December 1947. He was appointed bishop of the Diocese of Belgaum on 26 September 1967 and retired from same diocese on 1 December 1994.

== See also ==
- Diocese of Belgaum
