= Robert Roxby (cricketer) =

Australian cricketer

Personal information
- Born: 16 March 1926; Newcastle, New South Wales, Australia
- Died: 7 February 2010 (aged 83); Adelaide, Australia
- Source: ESPNcricinfo, 24 January 2017

Robert Roxby (16 March 1926 – 7 February 2010) was an Australian cricketer. He played sixteen first-class matches for New South Wales and South Australia between 1953/54 and 1958/59.

== See also ==
- List of New South Wales representative cricketers
