= Amos Funk =

American farmer (1911–2010)

Amos H. Funk
- Born: October 18, 1911; Millersville, Pennsylvania, U.S.
- Died: February 14, 2010 (aged 98)
- Education: Pennsylvania State University
- Occupation: Farmer

Amos H. Funk (October 18, 1911 – February 14, 2010) was an American farmer and farm preservationist. He served on several national, state and local advisory committees designed to preserve farmland in Pennsylvania and the United States.

== Early life ==
Amos Funk was born on his family's farm in Millersville, Pennsylvania, to parents, A. Herr and Nellie Eshleman Funk. He majored in economics at Pennsylvania State University. Funk married his wife, Esta E. (née Myer) Funk on September 22, 1936. The couple had six children—three daughters and three sons—during their 73-year marriage.

== Farm preservation and conservation ==
Amos began soil & land conservation in the 1930s on his own land after learning methods to prevent erosion.

He was appointed to the Pennsylvania Soil and Water Conservation Commission by former Pennsylvania Governors William Scranton, Raymond P. Shafer, Richard Thornburgh and Robert Casey. Former Pennsylvania Governor William Scranton also appointed Funk to the state's Committee on Agriculture, while former Governor Raymond Shafer placed him onto the Committee on the Preservation of Agricultural Land.

U.S. Secretary of Agriculture Earl Butz appointed Funk to the eighteen-member National Advisory Committee to the U.S. Soil Conservation Service in 1974.

Funk is credited with the creation of the Lancaster Farmland Trust, which he co-founded with three other individuals in 1985, and served as a trustee for twelve years.

Funk was a recipient of numerous awards and recognitions, including the Teddy Roosevelt Conservation Award from U.S. President George H. W. Bush in 1990.

Funk also served as the president of the Conestoga Valley Watershed Conservation District for seventeen years, president of the Pennsylvania Soil and Water Conservation District Directors, Inc., and president of the Pennsylvania Vegetable Growers Association.

== Death ==
Amos Funk died on February 14, 2010, at Lancaster Regional Medical Center in Lancaster, Pennsylvania, at the age of 98. He was a resident of Lancaster at the time of his death. He was survived by his wife, Esta E. (Myer) Funk; three daughters, Grace, Anna Mae and June; three sons, Amos H. Jr., Andrew and Frederick; eleven grandchildren; twelve great-grandchildren; and a great-great-grandson.

Ed Thompson, a senior associate and California director of American Farmland Trust called Funk the "heart and soul of farmland preservation in Lancaster County and inspired not only the community but the whole country to embrace it." Karen Martynick, executive director of Lancaster Farmland Trust, noted that without Funk there might not be the 86,000 acres (348 km^{2}) of preserved farmland in Lancaster County, Pennsylvania, as of 2010.
