= Clarence R. Autery =

United States Air Force general

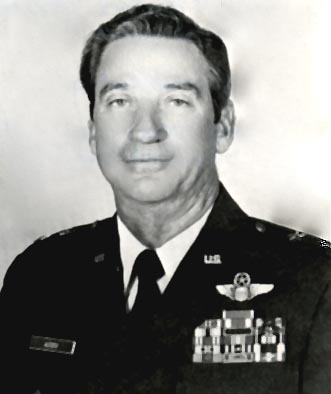
- Born: September 23, 1933; Corrigan, Texas, U.S.
- Died: February 23, 2010 (aged 76)
- Burial place: Fort Sam Houston National Cemetery, Texas
- Military career
- Allegiance: United States of America
- Branch: United States Air Force
- Service years: 1958–1988
- Rank: Major General
- Conflicts: Vietnam War
- Awards: Legion of Merit; Distinguished Flying Cross

Clarence Reuben Autery (September 23, 1933 – February 23, 2010) was a United States Air Force pilot and general who served in Strategic Air Command, ending his career as the Commander of the Eighth Air Force in 1985. A native of Polk County, Texas, he was commissioned through the Air Force Reserve Officer Training Corps at Baylor University in Waco and flew combat missions with Tactical Air Command during Operation Rolling Thunder in the Vietnam War. After joining SAC in the late 1970s, he commanded B-52 bomber units and served in a number of staff roles.

He is best known for his appearance in the 1979 docudrama First Strike, scenes of which were later edited into the television film The Day After with Autery and his staff depicted aboard the Looking Glass aircraft during a nuclear attack by the Soviet Union. For much of his later career in the Air Force, he flew and led Looking Glass sorties at SAC Headquarters in Offutt AFB, in Omaha, Nebraska. He was also interviewed about his role at SAC in the 1981 CBS News documentary series "The Defense Of The United States," which also used some of the "First Strike" footage. He would retire in 1988.

== Biography ==
Autery was born in Corrigan, Texas, in 1933. He would go on to graduate from Baylor University. Autery died on February 23, 2010.

== Career ==
Autery completed his training in 1959. He was then assigned to Seymour Johnson Air Force Base as a Boeing B-52 Stratofortress pilot. In 1961, he was stationed at Toul-Rosières Air Base, where he flew the Douglas B-66 Destroyer. In 1965, Autery was deployed to serve in the Vietnam War. He was first stationed at Takhli Royal Thai Air Force Base. Later, he was assigned to the 11th Tactical Reconnaissance Squadron at Udorn Royal Thai Air Force Base, where he flew the McDonnell Douglas F-4 Phantom II.

After serving for a time at the headquarters of the Air Force, Autery assumed command of the 17th Tactical Reconnaissance Squadron at Zweibrücken Air Base, again flying the McDonnell Douglas F-4 Phantom II. He then served as chief of maintenance of the 26th Tactical Reconnaissance Wing before transferring to the United States Air Forces in Europe in 1973, serving as the executive officer to the commander in chief. After graduating from the United States Army War College in 1975, Autery was stationed at Beale Air Force Base. While there, he eventually served as vice commander of the 100th Air Refueling Wing. He joined the 28th Bombardment Wing at Ellsworth Air Force Base in 1977, serving in the same position until assuming command the following year.

Later, Autery joined Strategic Air Command. He would become assistant deputy chief of staff for operations before assuming command of the 3rd Air Division at Andersen Air Force Base in 1982. In 1984, he was named vice commander of the Eighth Air Force at Barksdale Air Force Base. Autery later became director of programs and evaluation in the Office of the Deputy Chief of Staff, Programs and Resources of the Air Force before retiring in 1988. Awards he received during his career include the Legion of Merit, the Distinguished Flying Cross with two oak leaf clusters, the Meritorious Service Medal, the Air Medal with seven oak leaf clusters and the Air Force Commendation Medal.

== Family ==
Autery's grandson is basketball player Daniel Alexander.
