= Subir Raha =

Indian businessman (1948–2010)

- সুবীর রাহা
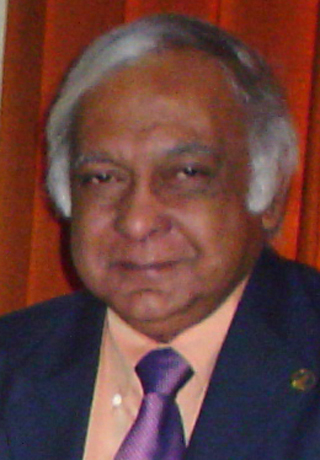
- Born: 28 August 1948; West Bengal, India
- Died: 1 February 2010 (aged 61); New Delhi, India
- Education: Jadavpur University (B.E. 1969); University of Leeds (MBA 1985); Administrative Staff College, Henley
- Awards: Energy Executive 2005 Petroleum Economist, London
- Scientific career
- Fields: Oil Sector
- Workplaces: Indian Oil Corporation and ONGC

Subir Raha (Bengali: সুবীর রাহা; 28 August 1948 – 1 February 2010) was a former Director (HR) of Indian Oil Corporation and ex-chairman and MD of Oil and Natural Gas Corporation He received global recognition as Energy Executive of the Year 2005, from the Petroleum Economist, London, in September 2006.

== Early life ==
Born on 28 August 1948, Raha graduated in Electronics & Telecommunications Engineering, specializing in Industrial Electronics, from Jadavpur University in 1969. He received several prizes including the medal for being the Best All-rounder graduate of the university.

Later, he completed his MBA with Distinction at the University of Leeds in 1985, specializing in Strategic Marketing. He was also an alumnus of the Administrative Staff College, Henley (1995).

== Career ==
=== ONGC ===
Raha served as Chairman & Managing Director of Oil and Natural Gas Corporation a Government of India Enterprise, for five years from 25 May 2001.

=== Oil Coordination Committee ===
Raha served (1996–98) as deputy in the Ministry of Petroleum & Natural Gas, Government of India, as the Head of the Oil Coordination Committee (OCC), the nodal agency for planning, monitoring and control of Oil & Gas business under the Administered Pricing regime. He developed the Petroleum Federation of India (Petrofed), the Chamber of Commerce for Oil and Gas Industry. He is a founding-member of the Petrotech Society, chartered to promote academics in India's Oil & Gas Industry.

=== IndianOil ===
Raha served IndianOil from 1970 to 2001. He served as Director (HR) (1998–2001), and concurrently, Director in-charge of Business Development, Information Technology and Corporate Communications of Indian Oil Corporation Ltd (IndianOil). He created several Indian Firsts: networked on-line transaction processing (OLTP) across India (1986–88), real-time automated product terminals (1993–95), and modern Retail Outlets with Convenience Stores & ATM (1995–96). Several of his innovations, especially in Logistics and LPG cooking gas marketing, became Industry standards. As Director (HR), he set up India's first in-house MBA program. He conceptualized and piloted the first global-scale ERP implementation in India.

He created the IndianOil Foundation to protect, preserve and promote the archaeological heritage of India. He managed the privatization of Lubrizol India Ltd.

== Death ==
Raha died in New Delhi on 1 February 2010 of lung cancer. He is survived by his wife and two children, a daughter and a son.

== Remembrance ==
Annually, UN Global Compact Network India (UN GCNI) organizes the Subir Raha Memorial Lecture.

After his death, Subir Raha Oil Museum was established at the premises of ONGC HQ in Dehradun.
