= Henry A. Miley Jr. =

United States Army general

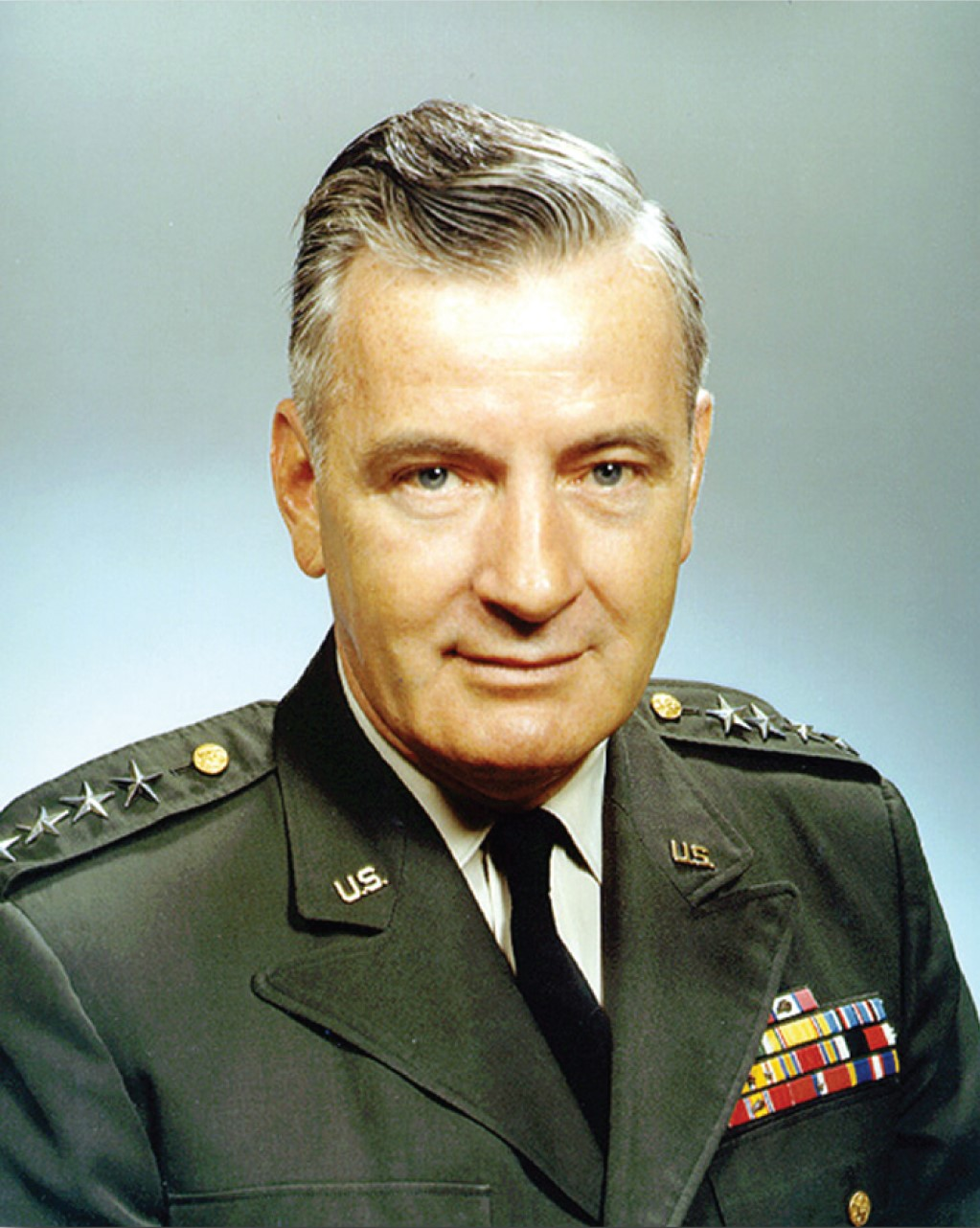
- General Henry A. Miley Jr.
- Born: 14 February 1915; Boston, Massachusetts
- Died: 6 February 2010 (aged 94); Tampa, Florida
- Military career
- Allegiance: United States
- Branch: United States Army
- Service years: 1940–1975
- Rank: General
- Commands: United States Army Materiel Command; Advanced Weapons Support Command
- Conflicts: World War II
- Awards: Army Distinguished Service Medal (3)

Henry Augustine Miley Jr. (14 February 1915 – 6 February 2010) was a United States Army four-star general who served as Commanding General, United States Army Materiel Command from 1970 to 1975.

== Military career ==
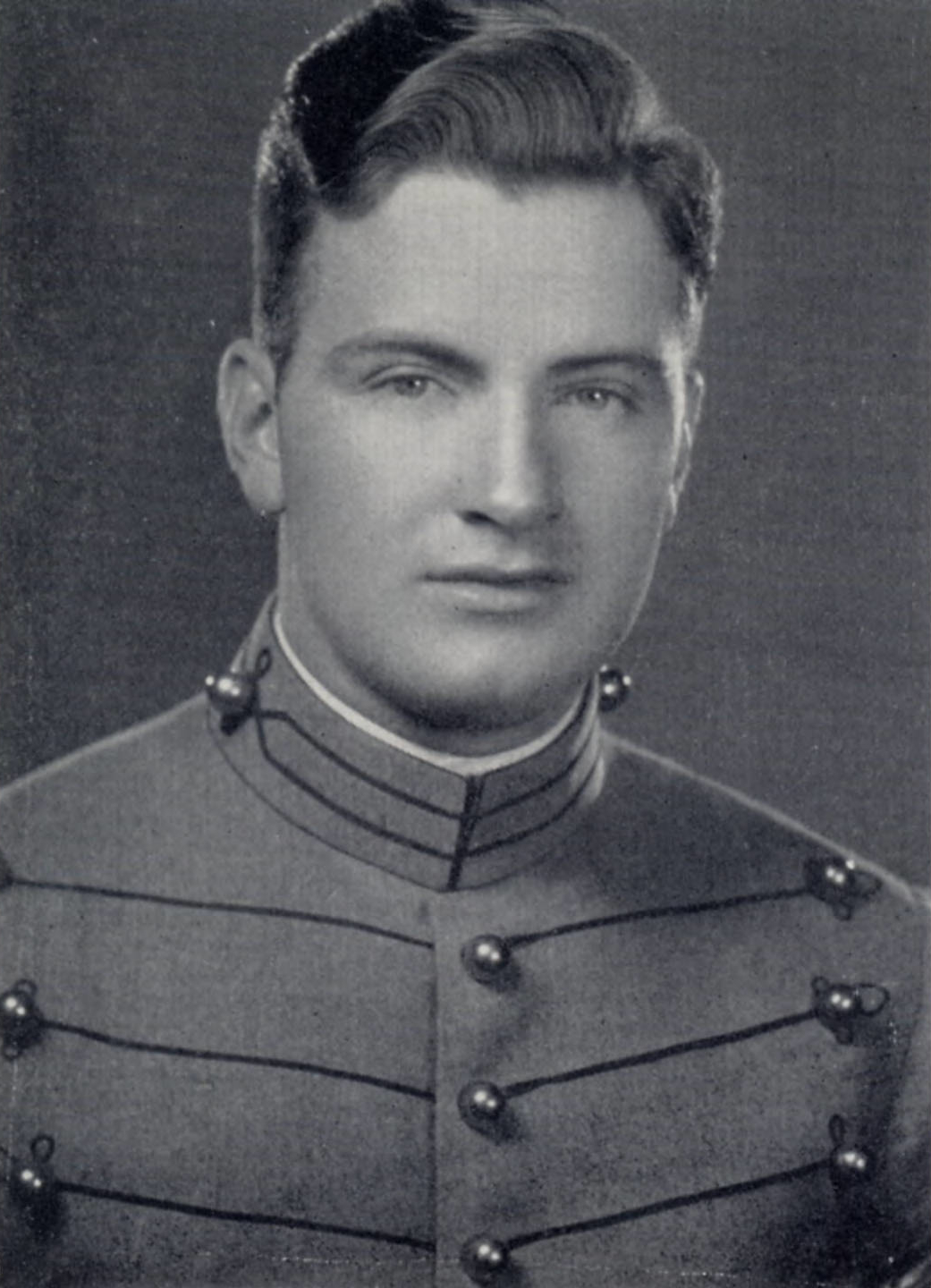
Miley as a West Point cadet in 1940

Miley was born in Boston, Massachusetts, on 14 February 1915. He graduated from historic Boston Latin School and began his military career at the United States Military Academy at West Point. He graduated from the academy in June 1940 and was commissioned a second lieutenant in the Coast Artillery Corps. His first station was at Fort Monroe, Virginia, where he was assigned to the 2nd Coast Artillery Regiment. In December 1941, he moved with the 57th Coast Artillery to Hawaii, to garrison the north shore of Oahu.

Miley returned to the United States in late 1942 and, after a tour at the Anti-Aircraft School, was assigned to the 33rd Anti-Aircraft Artillery Group. He remained with this organization through its training phases at Fort Bliss, Texas and Desert Training Center. In February 1944, his outfit moved to New Guinea, where it participated in the leap-frog operations, executed by the Army along the northern coast of that island.

In January 1945, Miley was detailed to the Ordnance Corps and left New Guinea and Artillery for Manila and Ordnance. He remained there until September 1946 in command, successively of the 189th Ordnance Battalion and the Ordnance General Supply Depot.

Following World War II, Miley served a year on the faculty of the Ordnance School at Aberdeen Proving Ground, Maryland, and in 1947 embarked on advanced education tour at Northwestern University. He received his master's degree in June 1949 and remained an additional year at Evanston, pursuing advanced studies in economics and statistics.

In 1950, Miley was transferred to Frankford Arsenal in Philadelphia, where he served as comptroller and then as Works Manager. After three years at Frankford, Miley went to Heidelberg, Germany, for a three-year tour on the staff of the USAREUR Ordnance Officer.

Miley returned to the United States in June 1956, attended the Army War College and in 1957 moved to Washington, D.C. to become chief of tank-automotive procurement in the Office of the Chief of Ordnance. In December 1961, he became Commander of the Advanced Weapons Support Command, Pirmasens, Germany. In March 1963, he was reassigned to Heidelberg, where he served as USAREUR Ordnance Officer. Returning to the United States in March 1964, Miley was assigned to Headquarters, United States Army Materiel Command as deputy director, Procurement and Production.

In August 1966 Miley was reassigned as Assistant DCSLOG (Programs and Budget), HQDA. Miley remained in this position until June 1969, when he was named Deputy Commanding General, United States Army Materiel Command, and promoted to the rank of lieutenant general. On 1 November 1970, he was promoted to the rank of full general and became the Commander of AMC until his retirement on 5 February 1975.

Miley died 6 February 2010, in Tampa, Florida.
