= Gabriela Konevska-Trajkovska =

Macedonian politician

Gabriela Konevska-Trajkovska (Габриела Конеска-Трајковска, née Konevska) (29 May 1971 – 10 February 2010) was a Macedonian politician who served as the country's Deputy Prime Minister for European Affairs from 2006 until 2008.

She was born Gabriela Konevska in Skopje in 1971. She worked as a political advisor to the special coordinator of Stability Pact for South Eastern Europe. Trajkovska also served as the president of the NGO, Transparency Macedonia, which works to fight corruption in the Republic of Macedonia.

In 2006, Trajkovska became the Deputy Prime Minister for European Affairs, focusing on accession of Macedonia to the European Union.

She and her husband Goran Trajkovski had a daughter, who was aged three at the time of her death.

Gabriela Konevska-Trajkovska died in Skopje on 10 February 2010, at the age of 38 after a long illness. She was buried at the Butel city cemetery in Skopje.
