= Global Family Day =

US day of peace and sharing

Global Family Day One Day of Peace and Sharing, is celebrated every January 1 in the United States as a global day of peace and sharing. Global Family Day grew out of the United Nations Millennium celebration, "One Day In Peace".

== History ==
Originally supported in the United States by Linda Grover, the efforts to promote the date included a 1996 children's book One Day In Peace, 2000 by Steve Diamond and also Robert Alan Silverstein, which was translated into 22 languages, and a utopian novel Tree Island by Grover herself.

== Observance ==
Global Family Day is primarily observed in the United States. However, participation is encouraged worldwide.The observance does not prescribe specific rituals and is marked in various ways depending on cultural and social contexts. Families and communities are encouraged to spend the first day of the year together, focusing on peace, understanding, and mutual respect.
