= Willie Anku =

Ghanaian music theorist

William Oscar "Willie" Anku
- Born: 25 July 1949; Gbadzeme, Volta Region, Ghana
- Died: 1 February 2010 (aged 60); Korle-Bu Teaching Hospital, Accra, Ghana
- Education: University of Montana, Missoula, University of Pittsburgh, University of Ghana, Legon
- Occupations: Musician, professor, ethnomusicologist

William Oscar "Willie" Anku (25 July 1949 – 1 February 2010) was a Ghanaian music theorist, ethnomusicologist, composer, and performer. His work combined Western set theory with computer programming and experience in working with performers of various West African musical traditions to create a comprehensive theory of African rhythm. He was "unique among Africa-based music theorists in attracting the attention of the US-based Society for Music Theory, being invited to give plenary lectures and receiving tributes from prominent US-based theorists.

== Music theory ==
Anku rejected the relevance of simple concepts of polymeter in understanding West African music.

He is noted for attempting to create a more natural, but non-indigenous system of music notation to the study of African music. Anku's circular notation shows the various "combinatoric aspects of [a] pattern relative to different metrical positions, based on how the rhythmic pattern is aligned with [a] regulative metric pattern."

Bode Omojola lists Anku among five contemporary scholars most influencing ideas of African Rhythm. His work was cited as influential on Godfried Toussaint's general geometric theory of musical timelines.

V. Kofi Agawu described his approach to West-African music theory as "structural set analysis," the title of two of his short books. He defended the analytical approach to African music in a 2007 interview on Ghanaian MetroTV.

In addition to its impact on understanding African music, Anku's theories have been cited in the study of György Ligeti.

== Life and education ==
Willie Anku came from Gbadzeme in the Avatime Traditional Area of the Volta Region of Ghana.

He received his Master of Music Education from the University of Montana, Missoula in 1976; MA and PhD in Ethnomusicology from the University of Pittsburgh in 1986 and 1988 respectively. He was head of the School of Performing Arts at the University of Ghana, Legon until just prior to his death.

Professor Anku was involved in a motor accident on 20 January 2010 and died 2 weeks later at the Korle Bu Teaching Hospital. He is survived by his wife, Madam Eva Ebeli, and three children.
