= Paul Rebillot =

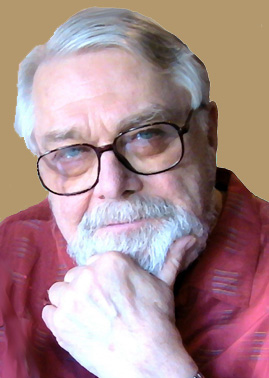
Image of Paul Rebillot

Paul Rebillot (May 19, 1931 – February 11, 2010) was a member of the human potential movement. He is the author of The Call to Adventure: Bringing the Hero’s Journey to Daily Life.

== Life ==
=== Early years ===
Paul Rebillot was born on May 19, 1931, in Detroit, Michigan. His initial academic training was in philosophy and education at the University of Detroit and was followed by a Masters in Communication Arts, specialising in drama, from the University of Michigan. Before and after his university years he worked with several theatre companies as a writer, producer and actor.

Rebillot's military service took him, for a year, to Japan where he produced and directed radio programs for the U.S. Army's Far East Radio Network. His exposure to the Japanese culture and particularly to Noh, the stylised and ritualised form of Japanese drama, was subsequently to become an important influence on his use of ritual and gesture in his work.

Returning to the United States, Rebillot developed an experimental theater department at San Francisco State College and, in the same period, worked with Mumako, a Japanese mime, developing his understanding of ritual gesture, meditation postures which shape the energies to the attitude expressed by the gesture, which became a key element in his work. In 1968, after a year of teaching at Stanford University's theater department, he founded in San Francisco The Gestalt Fool Theater Family, a commune and a radical performance group, and commenced experimental work combining theatre, ritual and therapy.

=== Esalen ===
The theater work, as well as a severe existential crisis, led him in 1971 to the Esalen Institute in Big Sur, California. There, he worked with Stan Grof and John C. Lilly, trained in Gestalt Practice with Esalen's co-founder Dick Price and studied group process with Will Schutz. Rebillot met Joseph Campbell, an expert in comparative mythology who believed monomyths, motifs of adventure and transformation to be found in all heroic tales, could be found in all cultures. These encounters with Price, Schutz and Campbell laid the foundations of Rebillot's subsequent work in the human potential movement.

In 1972, Rebillot worked on the psychiatric wards of community hospitals in Turlock and Martinez, California. He shared his own experience of mental suffering and how he emerged from it. In 1973, drawing on Campbell's work and integrating Gestalt practice, movement, meditation, ritual, group process, drama, art, and music, he structured The Hero's Journey. Rebillot's name is most widely associated with this self-discovery process.

=== Europe ===
In 1974, while continuing to offer workshops and Gestalt trainings at Esalen Institute, Rebillot brought The Hero's Journey to Europe. There, he worked at various centers, including the Centre de développement du potentiel humain and the Boyesen Institute, France, Jay Stattman's Institute of Unitive Psychology in The Netherlands and the Irish Foundation for Human Development. As his yearly tours throughout Europe developed, he attracted an eclectic mix of participants including many from the teaching and caring professions. Europe gradually became the location for most of his work and remained so for over thirty years.

In 1987 Rebillot was awarded a Laurance Rockefeller grant to work on a book about the Hero's Journey. In 1993, The Call to Adventure: Bringing the Hero’s Journey to Daily Life, was published, with a foreword by Stanislav Grof.

Rebillot had already published "The Hero’s Journey: Ritualizing the Mystery" in Spiritual Emergency: When Personal Transformation Becomes a Crisis (1989), a collective work edited by Stanislav and Christina Grof, to which he had contributed with Ronald Laing, Roberto Assagioli, John Weir Perry, Ram Dass, Lee Sannella, Jack Kornfield, Holger Kalweit, Anne Armstrong and Keith Thompson.

Rebillot initiated his last project in 2006 when he asked a cross-cultural group of nine students to join him and develop a journey based on the life of Abraham. The resulting workshop In the Footsteps of Abraham was delivered by that group in Rebillot's presence in Germany in 2007 and, after his retirement, in Ireland in 2009.

In March 2008, Rebillot retired from work in Europe, but continued to do training and consultancy work from his home in San Francisco. Upon his return he worked extensively with the Radical Change Group founders (Mahipal Lunia, Sergey Berezin & Arman Darini) to record and present his work to the world. In June 2009, just after his students facilitated In the footsteps of Abraham in Ireland, he fell ill. After struggling for eight months to overcome the effects of respiratory failure, he died at his home in San Francisco on February 11, 2010.

== Approach ==
Paul Rebillot was particularly struck by the suffering and confusion resulting from contemporary society's lack of significant rites of passage. He felt that, without shamans or ritual masters to guide them, modern women and men have to find their own lonely and sometimes traumatic paths from one stage of life to another. Hence, a fundamental theme of his work is personal transformation through ritual enactment.

His understanding of the power of myth and ritual helped him design self-discovery processes that he felt would enrich, heal and awaken individuals to their inner quest and the transpersonal dimensions of their lives. His experience of Gestalt practice led him to believe that each character in a myth represents a facet of oneself. Hence, experiencing a myth from inside, and from all points of view, he viewed as a way to reconnect with oneself and to reach renewed awareness. His background in theatre had convinced him of the capacity of bodily gesture and movement to reveal and to transform the point of view of the mind and the attitude of the heart. He believed that uniting the dimensions of body, heart and mind in order to ensure that one is true to oneself would lead to liberation. To this approach he added work with group processes, whereby group members support one another in their individual inner journeys, which he considered to be one of the most healing aspects of his work.

== Training ==
In 1988 Paul Rebillot inaugurated the School of Gestalt and Experiential Teaching, in Switzerland, a four-level professional training program combining Gestalt theory and practice with ritual, myth, and group process. Taking place over four years, this training offered practising therapists an opportunity to explore the nature of transformational processes such as the ones he had created, and to learn how to conceive and facilitate their own, according to the standards he had set. A North American training programme began in August 1993. In May 1996, he started a Rites of Passage training programme in Germany. From that time on, he offered advanced training programmes in Germany as well as in France, Ireland, England and Austria.

Parallel to this, students who wished to facilitate one of his structures, such as The Hero's Journey, had to get his approval after completing a specific apprenticeship programme inspired by the practice of many theater companies and of the medieval guilds, in which students travel, live and work with their teachers as part of their training.

== Legacy ==
After The Hero's Journey, created in 1973, Paul Rebillot developed numerous structures of inner journeys, including:

- The Lover's Journey: A Quest for the Inner Man and Woman
- Owning the Shadow
- Exorcising the Demon Should
- Death and Resurrection
- Rituals of Transformation
- Family Circles
- Dancing with the Gods
- Manifesting your Personal Myth
- The Quest for the Golden Fleece

Before he retired to San Francisco, Paul Rebillot appointed some of his students to carry on with his work. In Ireland, the Rebillot School of Gestalt and Experiential Teaching and, in France, the Ecole de Gestalt et processus expérientiels and in Germany the Institut fuer Gestalt und Erfahrung were formed. The mission of all schools is to promote, deliver and safeguard Rebillot's work. They offer the opportunity to experience the inner journeys designed by Rebillot himself or by his students, according to his principles and standards, as part of their training and certification, or subsequent to their certification. The Ecole de Gestalt et processus expérientiels delivers advanced training in French, the Institut fuer Gestalt und Erfahrung in German.

== Publications ==
- Rebillot, Paul with Kay, Melissa The Call to Adventure: Bringing the Hero’s Journey to Daily Life, HarperSanFrancisco, 1993, foreword by Stanislav Grof, ISBN 0-06-250709-5
- Rebillot, Paul with Kay, Melissa The Hero's Journey. A Call to Adventure, new printed edition of The Call to Adventure, Eagle Books 2017, ISBN 978-3946136-00-2
- Rebillot, Paul with Kay, Melissa The Hero's Journey. A Call to Adventure, new eBook edition of The Call to Adventure, Eagle Books 2017, ISBN 978-3946136-01-9
- Rebillot, Paul with Kay, Melissa Il Viaggio dell'Eroe, translation into Italian by Andreas Barella, Casa Editrice Ericlea, 2015, ISBN 978-88-96975-09-1
- Rebillot, Paul with Kay, Melissa Il Viaggio dell'Eroe, translation into Italian by Andreas Barella, eBook edition, Casa Editrice Ericlea, 2017, ASIN B01N9V9R6F, DOWNLOAD IT HERE
- Rebillot, Paul with Kay, Melissa Die Heldenreise: Ein Abenteuer der Kreativen Selbsterfahrung, translation into German by Lax-Lemeschko, Anna and Mittermair, Franz, Eagle-Books 2016(2), ISBN 978-3-9813672-0-1
- Rebillot, Paul, The Hero’s Journey: Ritualizing the Mystery in Spiritual Emergency: When Personal Transformation Becomes a Crisis, Grof, Stanislav & Grof, Christina editors, Warner Books, 1989, ISBN 978-0-87477-538-9
