= Werner Forman =

Czech photographer

Werner Forman (13 January 1921, in Prague – 13 February 2010, in London) was a Czech photographer. In the course of a long career he amassed a visual record of many of the world's ancient civilizations and non-European cultures. Forman initiated almost all of the eighty books which were illustrated solely with his photographs. Devoted to ancient and mainly non-European civilizations, they were published in many languages.

== Family ==
Born in Prague on 13 January 1921, he committed himself to photography in his teens. During the German occupation in World War II he documented for the Resistance atrocities in the Terezin (Theresienstadt) concentration camp. When in 1942 the Gestapo caught up with his group Forman evaded arrest by joining a trainload of young Czechs who had been conscripted to work in labor camp in Germany. There he later contracted scarlet fever and was transferred back to Prague where he slipped away again, only to be arrested with his brother, father and Jewish mother and sent to a concentration camp. At that time the men and woman were separated and, ironically, Forman’s mother was sent to Terezin, where she stayed until liberation. Forman is survived by his only child, Jofka Forman, who now lives in the United States, where she continues to work on Forman's legacy.

== Career ==
After the war Forman developed his interest in oriental art, contributing articles and photographs to the journal Nový Orient (New Orient). The subject of his first book was Chinese art in Czech collections with a text by the editor of Nový Orient, Lubor Hájek. It was published in 1954 not only in Czech but also with huge success in English and German by Artia, Prague's foreign language publishing house. Werner Forman's sensitive photography and his brother Bedřich's striking design made the book an international bestseller. To satisfy the unexpected demand it had to be reissued several times in both languages. Forman's photography impressed the Chinese authorities and in 1956 the brothers were invited to spend two months visiting museums and holding seminars for Chinese photographers. The Forman brothers were later invited to visit North Korea and Vietnam on similar missions. In 1962 the People's Art Publishing House in Beijing published a volume of 268 full-page photographs taken by Werner Forman in ten museums, with captions in Chinese, English and Russian. No sooner it was completed than the whole print run was destroyed following the fall from grace of the official responsible for the project. Only a few copies of the book remain.

In the years that followed Artia produced forty Werner Forman volumes including monographs on five important collections in the British Museum, with texts by their curators. These were realised due to the commitment of the publisher Paul Hamlyn, who found a ready market for the Forman books. Another such project was Egyptian Art (1962), featuring the renowned collection of Cairo's Egyptian Museum.

After the Soviet occupation of Czechoslovakia in 1968 Werner Forman made London his new base and he worked initially for Weidenfeld & Nicolson. From the mid-seventies he edited for Orbis Publishing a new series called Echoes of the Ancient World. Fifteen volumes in all were published and repeatedly reissued in many languages, on subjects as varied as the Aztecs, T'ang China, the Vikings and the Maori. in 1992 his photographs enriched The Life in Ancient Egypt by Eugen Strouhal, and in consequence the book was taken up by publishers in eleven countries and published in nine languages. Harvill Press published large photographic books called Werner Forman's New Zealand (1994) and in Phoenix rising - United Arab Emirates: Past, Present and Future (1996). In 1997 an exhibition of Forman's photographs of Art in Ancient Egypt was mounted in the Prague National Museum.

Having photographed in the course of his long career cultural monuments and artefacts in 55 countries, Werner Forman has left us an invaluable photographic archive.

== Books (selected) ==
- 1954 A Book of Chinese Art. Spring Books (text by Lubor Hájek)
- 1955 Hokusai: the Man Mad-on-Drawing. Spring Books (text by Joe Hloucha)
- 1956 Prehistoric Art. Spring Books (text by Josef Poulík)
- 1956 Exotic Art. Spring Books (edited by Lubor Hájek)
- 1957 Art of Far Lands. Spring Books (edited by Lubor Hájek)
- 1957 Harunobu. Spring Books (text by Lubor Hájek)
- 1957 Japanese Woodcuts: Early Periods. Spring Books (text by Lubor Hájek)
- 1958 Utamaro: Portraits in the Japanese Woodcut. Spring Books (text by Lubor Hájek)
- 1961 Tapestries from Egypt: Woven by the Children of Harrania, Paul Hamlyn Publisher (text by Ramses Wissa Wassef)
- 1967 Lamaistische Tanzmasken: der Erlik-Tsam in der Mongolei. Leipzig: Koehler & Amelang (text by Bjamba Rintschen)
- 1970 Assyrian palace reliefs in the British Museum. British Museum (text by R. D. Barnett)
- 1972 Woven by Hand, Paul Hamlyn Publisher, (text by Ramses Wissa Wassef)
