= Murder of Faiza Ashraf =

2010 murder in Akershus, Norway

Kidnapping and murder of Faiza Ashraf
- Faiza Ashraf
- Date: 3 February 2010
- Time: 06:40
- Location: Bærum and Asker, Norway
- Cause: Strangulation
- Deaths: Faiza Ashraf
- Burial: Haslum, Norway
- Suspects: Shamrez Khan (29); Håvard Nyfløt (27)
- Charges: Murder and kidnapping
- Verdict: 19 years (Khan); 18 years (Nyfløt)

Faiza Ashraf was a 26-year-old Pakistani-Norwegian woman, who was kidnapped early on the morning of 3 February 2010 from a bus-stop at Haslum in Bærum, outside of Oslo, while on her way to work. She was later found murdered near the parking lot in Solli, in the neighbouring municipality of Asker.

After receiving a call from Ashraf alerting them to her kidnap, the police arrested Shamrez Khan, and later Håvard Nyfløt, the latter having admitted to kidnapping Ashraf on the orders of Khan. Both men were convicted and sentenced to prison. Known as the "Faiza-case", the case generated a considerable amount of media attention in Norway at the time. It was one of the first incidents of non-gang-related contract killings in modern Norwegian history.

== Kidnapping ==
In the early morning of 3 February 2010, 26-year-old Faiza Ashraf was waiting for the bus leaving her home in Haslum and heading to downtown Oslo, where she worked in a clothing boutique. While she was standing at the bus stop at approximately 06:40, 25-year-old Håvard Nyfløt pulled up, grabbed her and forced her into the boot of his car. Ashraf managed to call the police from her mobile phone and inform them that she was being kidnapped, but she could not give her exact location. This event was witnessed by at least one passing motorist.

After a short while, Nyfløt stopped the car and informed her that he was being paid by a third person to kidnap her, and that he was to be paid kr 100,000 (equivalent to about US$16,500 at the time and $24,400 currently) for carrying this out. He also promised not to harm her, before continuing the journey. Ashraf then passed that information, along with a short description of her kidnapper, to the police, who were trying to trace the call. She also provided the police with the identity of Khan, whom she deduced had ordered her kidnapping. Khan had for the past five years been obsessed with marrying her, and according to Ashraf, harassed and tormented her during this period.

After driving to the forested area of Solli in Asker, about 25 minutes out of Oslo, Nyfløt opened his trunk and found Ashraf unresponsive. He then dragged her body to a previously dug shallow grave about 200 metres (660 ft) from a popular ski-trail. Afterwards he vacuumed the trunk and used a makeshift blowtorch to eliminate leftover evidence, before travelling to Sweden with his girlfriend.

== Investigation ==
On the same day of the kidnapping, police announced that a woman in her 20s from Asker was missing. Police stated that they believed she had been kidnapped. All traffic coming through Asker was stopped and checked by heavily armed police, That afternoon, Police arrested 28-year-old taxi-driver Shamrez Khan in Oslo. Ashraf had named him as possible accomplice in her kidnapping in her brief call to the police. Khan had a long history of harassment and stalking Ashraf, and according to friends she felt threatened by him. He initially denied all culpability, and stated his desire to participate in finding her.

Large numbers of police and volunteer forces searched the Vestmarka woodlands adjacent to where her phone signal was last recorded, but could not locate the missing 26-year-old. Police also issued a yellow notice, in case she had been abducted and taken abroad.

On 10 February, police arrested 25-year-old Håvard Nyfløt, on suspicion of carrying out the kidnapping. He later revealed under interrogation that Ashraf was dead and gave the police the location of the body. Nyfløt stated that in order to pay off his gambling debts, he had kidnapped Ashraf at the behest of Khan, and that she had suffocated by accident while in the car boot. Khan denied ordering her murder and stated his intention was to have her kidnapped and tortured, not murdered. The motive for this was Ashraf's refusal to marry him. The two suspects had met while Nyfløt worked at a petrol station in Tveita where Khan was a regular customer.

== Trial ==
On 14 May 2011, Nyfløt and Khan were convicted respectively on the counts of second-degree murder and kidnapping of Faiza Ashraf. Neither of the two was convicted of premeditated murder. They were sentenced to 8 and 17 years in prison, respectively. However, both sentences were cleared for an appeal process by attorney general Tor-Aksel Busch who felt strongly that the court had made the wrong decision, and during the second trial, both men were convicted of premeditated murder and kidnapping and had their sentences increased to 19 years for Khan and 18 years for Nyfløt. In addition, both men were to pay kr 200,000 (equivalent to about US$35,700 at the time and $51,100 currently) in compensation to Ashraf's parents.

On 28 March 2012, the Supreme Court of Norway declined to review both cases, effectively ending the appeal processes of both men.

== See also ==
- List of kidnappings
- Lists of solved missing person cases
