= G. K. Podila =

Indian–American biologist

- Undated photo of Podila
- Born: Gopi K. Podila; September 14, 1957
- Died: February 12, 2010 (aged 52); Huntsville, Alabama, US
- Cause of death: Gunshot wound
- Occupation: Professor of Biology at University of Alabama in Huntsville
- Spouse: Vani Podila

Academic background
- Education: Nagarjuna University, India (BSc); Louisiana State University (MA); Indiana State University (PhD)

Academic work
- Discipline: Plant molecular biology

Gopi K. Podila (September 14, 1957 – February 12, 2010) was an Indian American biologist who served as a professor at the University of Alabama in Huntsville. He was one of three faculty members killed in a mass shooting at the university on February 12, 2010. Podila was chairperson of the university's department of biological sciences, with a particular interest in the ecology of Populus and their mycorrhizal symbionts.

== Research career ==
He listed his research interests as "engineering tree biomass for bioenergy, functional genomics of plant-microbe interactions, plant molecular biology and biotechnology".

In particular, Podila studied genes that regulate growth in fast growing trees, especially poplar and aspen. He advocated prospective use of fast growing trees and grasses as an alternative to corn sources for producing ethanol. He was also the coordinator of an international consortium of institutions that has deciphered the genome of mycorrhizal fungus, a fungus whose symbiotic properties allow trees to generate large amounts of biomass.

G. K. Podila received a B.Sc. degree from Nagarjuna University in India. He obtained a master's degree from Louisiana State University in 1983 and a PhD in molecular biology from Indiana State University in 1987. Prior to joining the University of Alabama in Huntsville, he worked at Michigan Technological University from 1990 to 2002.

Podila was an Editorial Board member of the journals Symbiosis, New Phytologist, Physiology and Molecular Biology of Plants, and Journal of Plant Interactions.

At the time of his death Podila was a Councilor of the International Symbiosis Society. He is survived by his widow, Vani Podila, and two daughters.

== UAH shooting ==
On February 12, 2010, Amy Bishop, a faculty member in Podila's department, drew a handgun during a staff meeting and shot six people. Podila and two other faculty members were killed. Bishop was taken into custody outside the building and charged with capital murder. Bishop was convicted and sentenced to life in prison.

== Works ==
- Ajit Varma; Gopi K. Podila, eds. (2006). Biotechnological applications of microbes. Tunbridge Wells, Kent: Anshan. ISBN 1-904798-61-6. LCCN 2006411669.
- Gopi K. Podila; David D. Douds, Jr., eds. (2000). Current advances in mycorrhizae research. St. Paul, Minn.: American Phytopathological Society. pp. ix, 193. ISBN 0-89054-245-7. LCCN 99068446.
- Leland J. Cseke; Peter B. Kaufman; Gopi K. Podila; Chung-Jui Tsai, eds. (2002). Handbook of molecular and cellular methods in biology and medicine. Taylor & Francis. ISBN 0-8493-0815-1.
