= Enn Soosaar =

Estonian translator, critic, columnist

Enn Soosaar (13 February 1937 in Tallinn – 10 February 2010 in Keila) was an Estonian translator, critic, columnist and publicist. Soosaar translated the works of many American authors, including Ernest Hemingway, William Faulkner, and Saul Bellow into Estonian and was instrumental in introducing American literature to an Estonian audience. Soosaar was awarded an honorary doctorate from the University of Tallinn. In February 1997, the Order of the National Coat of Arms, Class IV was bestowed on him. From 1944 to 1951, Soosaar studied at Hageri's 7-grade school, after which he attended high school from 1951 to 1954 at Tallinn's Second Gymnasium. From 1955 to 1956, he studied at the Tallinn Correspondence School. In 1964, he graduated from the distance education program at the Tartu State University with a degree in English philology.
