= DSK Mariam Church =

Oriental Orthodox church in Washington, D.C.

- Re'ese Adbarat Debre Selam Kidist Mariam Ethiopian Orthodox Tewahedo Church
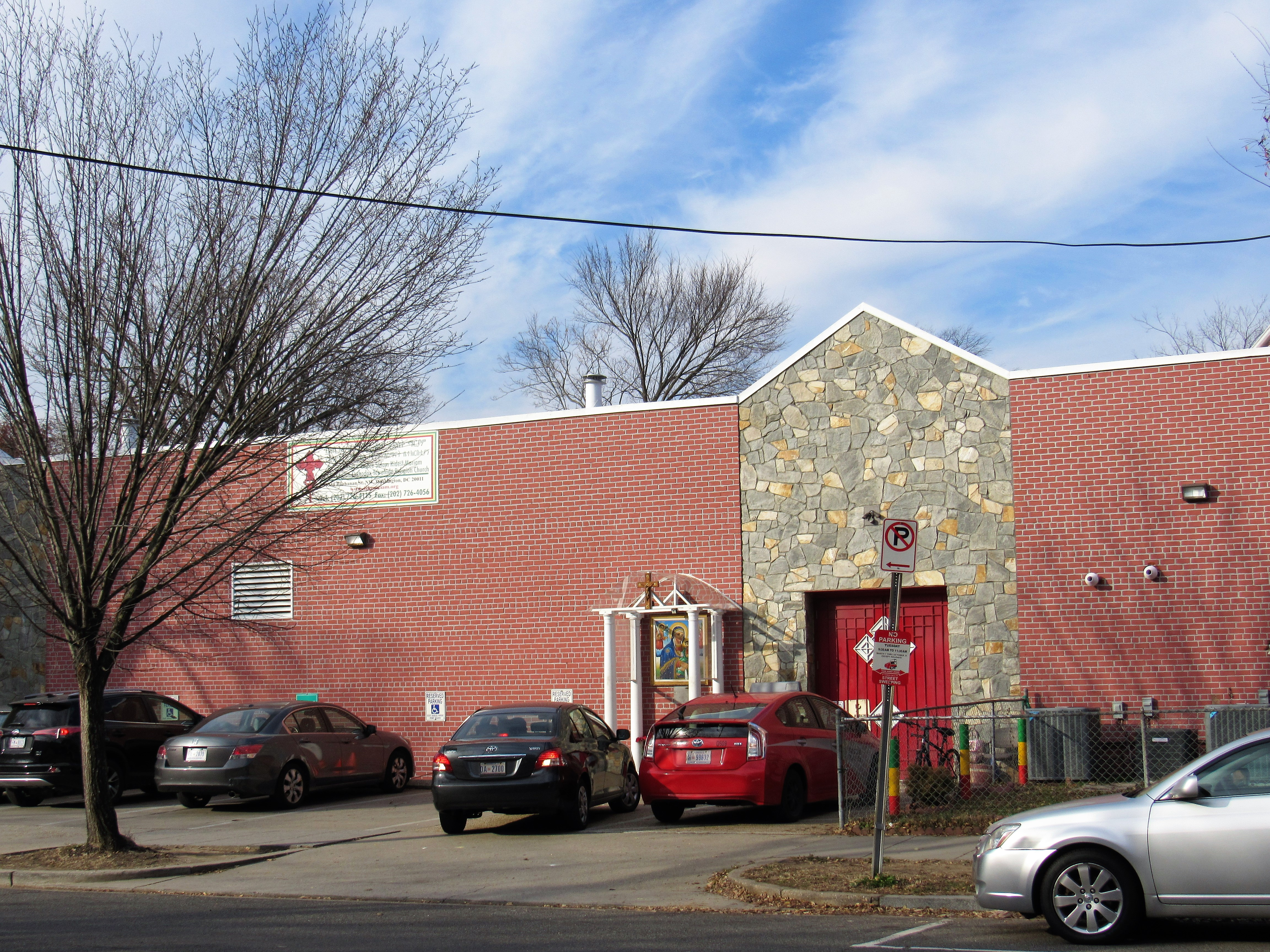
- DSK Mariam Church photographed in 2018
- DSK Mariam Church
- 38°56′46″N 77°01′54″W
- Location: 1350 Buchanan St NW; Washington, D.C.
- Country: United States
- Denomination: Ethiopian Orthodox
- Website: dskmariamdc.org

History
- Founded: 1987

Administration
- Diocese: Metropolitan Washington Archdiocese

Re'ese Adbarat Debre Selam Kidist Mariam Ethiopian Orthodox Tewahedo Church, more commonly known as DSK Mariam Church, is an Ethiopian Orthodox church in Washington, D.C. It was founded in 1987 and is one of the oldest Ethiopian Orthodox congregations in the United States.

== History ==
The church was founded by Kehali Wondafferew, Altayewerq Berhaneselassie, Seifu Metaferia and Deacon Negusie Woldemariam in 1987 in Washington, D.C., which has the largest Ethiopian community in the United States. It is one of the oldest Ethiopian Orthodox congregations in the United States. It moved to its Buchanan Avenue location in 1997.

As of 2025, the parish had over 1,500 registered members and over 4,000 people attended services weekly. Services are conducted in Amharic and English.
