= List of football clubs in Albania =

This all-time list features football clubs that have competed in Albania's four divisions, arranged in alphabetical order. Included are clubs from the women's league and clubs that have been disbanded.

== Active clubs ==
As of 20 January 2026

League championships
Cup championships
Supercup championships

=== Men ===
#	Club	Location	Stadium	Capacity	Founded	Trophies		
#	Club	Location	Stadium	Capacity	Founded	League	Cup	Supercup
1	Adriatiku 2012	Durrës	Kamza Sports Complex	1,500	2012	0	0	0
2	Albanët	Tirana	Kompleksi Internacional	1,000	2020	0	0	0
3	Albpetrol	Patos	Alush Noga Stadium	2,150	1947	0	0	0
4	Apolonia	Fier	Loni Papuçiu Stadium	6,800	17.06.1925	0	1	0
5	Arnisa	Tërbuf	Kamza Sports Complex	1,500	28.08.2023	0	0	0
6	Basania	Bushat	Basania Stadium	500	12.06.2020	0	0	0
7	Besa	Kavajë	Besa Stadium	8,000	25.10.1925	0	2	1
8	Besëlidhja	Lezhë	Brian Filipi Stadium	5,000	17.11.1930	0	0	0
9	Bulqiza	Bulqizë	Bulqizë Stadium	n/a	18.02.1964	0	0	0
10	Burreli	Burrel	Liri Ballabani Stadium	3,000	1935	0	0	0
11	Butrinti	Sarandë	Andon Llapa Stadium	5,000	25.01.1936	0	0	0
12	Bylis	Ballsh	Adush Muça Stadium	5,200	14.07.1972	0	0	0
13	Delvina	Delvinë	Panajot Pano Stadium	2,500	1949	0	0	0
14	Devolli	Bilisht	Bilisht Stadium	1,050	05.06.1927	0	0	0
15	Dinamo City	Tirana	Internacional Complex	1,000	03.03.1950	18	13	2
16	Eagle FA	Tirana	Skënder Halili Complex	n/a	19.10.2021	0	0	0
17	Egnatia	Rrogozhinë	Egnatia Arena	4,000	15.09.1934	1	2	0
18	AF Elbasani	Elbasan	Elbasan Arena	12,800	02.08.2021	0	0	0
19	Erzeni	Shijak	Tofik Jashari Stadium	4,000	14.06.1931	0	0	0
20	Flamurtari	Vlorë	Flamurtari Stadium	8,200	23.03.1923	1	4	2
21	Gramozi	Ersekë	Ersekë Stadium	2,000	1927	0	0	0
22	Gramshi	Gramsh	Myslim Koçi Stadium	3,100	1989	0	0	0
23	AS Himara	Himarë	n/a		2022	0	0	0
24	Iliria	Fushë-Krujë	Redi Maloku Stadium	3,000	10.06.1992	0	0	0
25	Kastrioti	Krujë	Kastrioti Stadium	8,400	1926	0	0	0
26	Këlcyra	Këlcyrë	Demir Allamani Stadium	1,000	16.09.1981	0	0	0
27	Kinostudio	Tirana	Kompleksi i Kombëtares Kamëz	500	1996	0	0	0
28	Klosi	Klos	Liri Ballabani Stadium	3,000	1994	0	0	0
29	Korabi	Peshkopi	Korabi Stadium	6,000	03.03.1935	0	0	0
30	Kukësi	Kukës	Zeqir Ymeri Stadium	8,000	04.03.1930	1	2	1
31	Labëria	Vlorë	Narta Sports Complex		06.03.2019	0	0	0
32	Laçi	Laç	Laçi Stadium	5,300	1960	0	2	1
33	AF Luftëtari	Gjirokastër	Gjirokastra Stadium	8,400	18.12.2020	0	0	0
34	Lushnja	Lushnjë	Roza Haxhiu Stadium	8,500	27.07.1930	0	0	0
35	Luzi 2008	Luz i Vogël	Luz i Vogël Stadium	600	29.09.2008	0	0	0
36	Maliqi	Maliq	Jovan Asko Stadium	1,500	1990	0	0	0
37	Memaliaj	Memaliaj	Karafil Çaushi Stadium	1,500	1947	0	0	0
38	Murlani	Vau i Dejës	Fusha Sportive Barbullush	500	2019	0	0	0
39	Naftëtari	Kuçovë	Bashkim Sulejmani Stadium	5,000	1926	0	0	0
40	Olimpic Shkodra	Shkodër	Zmijani Complex		2024	0	0	0
41	Oriku	Orikum	Petro Ruci Stadium	2,000	1955	0	0	0
42	Osumi	Ura Vajgurore		n/a	18.08.2018	0	0	0
43	Partizani	Tirana	Arena e Demave	9,500	04.02.1946	17	15	3
44	Përmeti	Përmet	Durim Qypi Stadium	4,000	1930	0	0	0
45	Pogradeci	Pogradec	Gjorgji Kyçyku Stadium	10,700	1932	0	0	0
46	Prestige	Tirana	Kompleksi Internacional	1,000	2022	0	0	0
47	Selenica	Selenicë	Selenicë Stadium	4,000	1930	0	0	0
48	Skënderbeu	Korçë	Skënderbeu Stadium	12,343	08.1926	8	1	3
49	Skrapari	Çorovodë	Skrapar Sports Field	1,500	1959	0	0	0
50	Sopoti	Librazhd	Sopoti Stadium	3,000	1948	0	0	0
51	Spartaku	Tirana	Marko Boçari Stadium	2,500	1946	0	0	0
52	Shënkolli	Shënkoll	Shënkoll Stadium	3,000	05.07.2011	0	0	0
53	Shkumbini	Peqin	Shkumbini Stadium	6,000	1924(?)	0	0	0
54	Tepelena	Tepelenë	Sabaudin Shehu Stadium	2,000	1945	0	0	0
55	Teuta	Durrës	Niko Dovana Stadium	12,040	29.01.1920	1	4	2
56	Tërbuni	Pukë	Ismail Xhemali Stadium	1,950	1936	0	0	0
57	Tirana	Tirana	Selman Stërmasi Stadium	9,600	25.08.1920	26	16	12
58	Tomori	Berat	Tomori Stadium	14,890	25.11.1923	0	0	0
59	Turbina	Cërrik	Nexhip Trungu Stadium	6,600	1956	0	0	0
60	Valbona	Bajram Curri		n/a	2013	0	0	0
61	Veleçiku	Koplik	Kompleksi Vellezërit Duli	2,000	1948	0	0	0
62	Vllaznia	Shkodër	Loro Boriçi Stadium	16,000	16.02.1919	9	8	2
63	Vora	Vorë	Fusha Sportive Marqinet	1,500	1989	0	0	0

=== Women ===
#	Club	Location	Stadium	Capacity	Founded	Trophies	
#	Club	Location	Stadium	Capacity	Founded	League	Cup
1	Apolonia	Fier	Loni Papuçiu Stadium	6,800	28.08.2013	0	1
2	Gramshi	Gramsh	Myslim Koçi Stadium	1,500	18.09.2023	0	0
3	Kinostudio	Tirana		n/a	08.07.2009	0	0
4	Laçi	Laç	Laçi Stadium	2,300	10.09.2022	0	0
5	Lushnja	Lushnjë	Roza Haxhiu Stadium	8,000	2020	0	0
6	Partizani	Tirana	Arena e Demave	4,500	2020	0	0
7	Skënderbeu	Korçë	Skënderbeu Stadium	5,724	11.11.2013	0	0
8	Teuta	Durrës	Niko Dovana Stadium	12,040	2015	0	0
9	Tirana	Tirana	Skënder Halili Complex	500	2009	0	0
10	Vllaznia	Shkodër	Reshit Rusi Stadium	1,200	2013	11	10

== Disbanded clubs ==
As of 4 June 2024

League championships
Cup championships
Supercup championships

=== Men ===
#	Club	Location	Founded	Disbanded	Trophies		
#	Club	Location	Founded	Disbanded	League	Cup	Supercup
1	Ada	Velipojë	06.03.1996	2023	0	0	0
2	Adriatiku Mamurras	Mamurras	1949	2017	0	0	0
3	Alfavita Shëngjin		n/a	n/a	0	0	0
4	Belshi	Belsh	2012	2016	0	0	0
5	Çakrani	Çakran	1991	2014	0	0	0
6	Çlirimi	Fier	1988	2011	0	0	0
7	Dinamo Shkodër	Shkodër	n/a	n/a	0	0	0
8	Dinamo Vlorë	Vlorë	1952	n/a	0	0	0
9	Divjaka	Divjakë	1960	2020	0	0	0
10	Djelmnia Shkodrane	Shkodër	2010	2018	0	0	0
11	Domozdova	Prrenjas	1979	2018	0	0	0
12	Drini 2004	Dibër	18.04.2004	2023	0	0	0
13	Elbasani	Elbasan	1929	2022	2	2	1
14	F.C.I.T	Pezë Helmës	08.2014	2022	0	0	0
15	Flamurtari B	Vlorë	n/a	n/a	0	0	0
16	Fushmbret	Elbasan	2005	2015	0	0	0
17	Golemi	Golem	14.10.2013	2016	0	0	0
18	Gostima	Gostimë	2001	2016	0	0	0
19	Harkëtari	Klos	1939	1991	0	0	0
20	Himara	Himarë	1932	2017	0	0	0
21	IDS Tirana	Tirana	2012	n/a	0	0	0
22	Internacionale Tirana	Tirana	01.03.2013	n/a	0	0	0
23	Jehona Kozare	Kozare	2005	n/a	0	0	0
24	Kamza	Kamëz	10.09.1936	2019	0	0	0
25	Kevitan	Tirana	12.07.2014	2019	0	0	0
26	Kukësi B	Kukës	n/a	2020	0	0	0
27	Luftëtari	Gjirokastër	15.03.1930	29.09.2020	0	0	0
28	Luftëtari i Sh.B.O	Tirana	1951	1956	0	0	0
29	Mirdita	Rrëshen	01.11.1950	2021	0	0	0
30	Olimpiku Yrshek	Yrshek	2002	2015	0	0	0
31	Olimpiku Plug	Lushnjë	n/a	n/a	0	0	0
32	Pajova	Pajovë	01.10.2013	2015	0	0	0
33	Partizani B	Tirana	04.02.2013	2021	0	0	0
34	Pirust	Tirana	2019	2020	0	0	0
35	Pojani	Pojan	1940	2014	0	0	0
36	Poliçani	Poliçan	n/a	n/a	0	0	0
37	Skënderbeu B	Korçë	31.08.2015	n/a	0	0	0
38	Sopoti B	Librazhd	n/a	n/a	0	0	0
39	Studenti	Tirana	1953	n/a	0	0	0
40	Sukthi	Sukth	10.07.2009	n/a	0	0	0
41	Shkëndija Durrës	Durrës	1970	n/a	0	0	0
42	Shkëndija Tiranë	Tirana	01.1968	n/a	0	0	0
43	Shkodra	Shkodër	09.11.1996	n/a	0	0	0
44	Tekstilisti Stalin	Yzberish	1949	1976	0	0	0
45	Term	Yrshek	2010	n/a	0	0	0
46	Teuta B	Durrës	2013	n/a	0	0	0
47	Tirana B	Tirana	22.01.2013	n/a	0	0	0
48	Turbina B	Cërrik	n/a	n/a	0	0	0
49	Vlora	Vlorë	2007	2012	0	0	0
50	Vllaznia B	Shkodër	2015	n/a	0	0	0

=== Women ===
#	Club	Location	Founded	Disbanded	Trophies		
#	Club	Location	Founded	Disbanded	League	Cup	Supercup
1	AAS	Shkodër	20.08.2012	10.09.2022	0	0	0
2	Ada	Velipojë	09.08.2007	2013	3	1	1
3	Albiks	Rubik	2007	2011	0	0	0
4	Atletik Klub		n/a	n/a	0	0	0
5	Bilisht Sport	Bilisht	n/a	n/a	0	0	0
6	Dajti	Tirana	2013	2020	0	0	0
7	Dardania Sport	Tropojë	22.03.2008	2014	0	0	0
8	The Door	Shkodër	20.04.2007	2017	0	0	0
9	Elbasani	Elbasan	30.10.2013	2015	0	0	0
10	Juban Danja	Juban	06.09.2005	2021	0	2	0
11	Kamza	Kamëz	25.08.2010	2014	0	0	0
12	Kukësi	Kukës	13.11.2013	2023	0	0	0
13	Maliqi	Maliq	n/a	n/a	0	0	0
14	Memaliaj Sport	Memaliaj	30.10.2008	2011	0	0	0
15	Murlani	Vau i Dejës	n/a	n/a	0	0	0
16	Pogradeci	Pogradec	n/a	n/a	0	0	0
17	Shkëndija Durrës	Durrës	09.2010	2015	0	0	0
18	Term	Bilisht	n/a	n/a	0	0	0
19	Tirana AS	Tirana	09.08.2007	10.09.2022	1	1	0

== Name designations ==
During communist rule, due to the political and strategic alliances of the Albanian State, teams frequently changed names, so much so that today's football fans cannot distinguish them or remember them vaguely. Many of these teams were named after significant political events of the Party of Labour or from the wartime period, when their home cities were liberated. Most of the denominations no longer exist, while a few still remain. Only Partizani has kept its original name, whereas Dinamo briefly changed it to "Olimpik", between the 1995–97 seasons.

Political names
Several teams were named after notable political events or liberation dates: “17 Nëntori” of Tirana, “5 Shtatori” of Çorovodë (Skrapar), “31 Korriku” of Burrel, “24 Maj” of Përmet, “21 Shkurti” of Selenicë, “Labinoti” of Elbasan, “8 Nëntori” of Shijak, “10 Korriku” of Gramsh, “22 Tetori” of Poliçan, and “18 Shkurti” of Bulqizë.

Soviet influence
The naming of some teams followed the Soviet model: “Dinamo” of Tirana, “Traktori” of Lushnje, “Lokomotiva” of Durrës, “Ylli i Kuq” of Pogradec, “Industriali” of Laç, “Kombinati Stalin” of the Stalin Textile Factory, “Minatori” of Tepelenë, “Punëtori” of Patos, “Vullneti” of Rrogozhinë. Many of these names are no longer in use, with a few exceptions such as “Turbina” of Cërrik.

Mountains and rivers
Teams were also named after local geographical features. For instance: “Tomori” of Berat, “Melesini” of Leskovik, “Korabi” of Peshkopi, “Trebeshina” of Këlcyrë, “Sopoti” of Librazhd, “Veleçiku” of Koplik, and “Dajti” of Kamza were named after mountains. Similarly, a few teams were named after rivers and green pastures, such as “Shkumbini” of Peqin, “Erzeni” of Shijak, “Devolli” of Bilisht, “Bistrica” of Delvinë, “Valbona” of Bajram Curri, and “Domosdova” of Prrenjas.

Folk heroes and the Antiquity
Historical figures and connotations alike influenced team names, such as: “Besa” of Kavajë, “Luftëtari” of Gjirokastër, “Flamurtari” and “Ismail Qemali” of Vlorë, “Skënderbeu” and “Liria” of Korçë, “Partizani” of Tirana, “Besëlidhja” of Lezhë, “Ylli” of Shkodër and “Dragoi” of Pogradec. Additionally, name sites of antiquity were used: “Apollonia” of Fier, “Butrinti” of Sarandë and “Bylis” of Ballsh.

== See also ==
- Albanian Football Federation
- List of football clubs in Kosovo
