= 2026–27 Kategoria Superiore Femra =

Kategoria Superiore Femra
- Season: 2026–27
- Dates: 26 September 2026 – May 2027
- Matches: 32
- Goals: 238 (7.44 per match)
- Top goalscorer: Megi Doçi (18 goals)
- Biggest home win: Teuta 21–0 Lushnja (7 November 2026)
- Biggest away win: Lushnja 0–18 Vllaznia (25 October 2026)
- Highest scoring: Teuta 21–0 Lushnja (7 November 2026)
- Longest winning run: 7 matches Apolonia
- Longest unbeaten run: 7 matches Apolonia
- Longest winless run: 8 matches Lushnja
- Longest losing run: 8 matches Lushnja
- All statistics correct as of 22 November 2026.

The 2026–27 Kategoria Superiore Femra is the 18th official season of top-tier women's football in Albania. The season will begin on 26 September 2026 and end in May 2027.

The winners of this season's Kategoria Superiore Femra will earn a place in the second qualifying round of the 2027–28 UEFA Women's Champions League, with the second placed club earning a place in the first qualifying round of the 2027–28 UEFA Europa Women's Cup.

== Teams ==
=== Locations ===
2026–27 Kategoria Superiore Femra teams.

Team	Home city	Stadium	Capacity	2025–26 season
Apolonia	Fier	Apolonia Academy		2nd
Atletik Klub	Shkodër	Zmijani Complex		8th
Egnatia	Rrogozhinë	Fusha e Plugut		7th
Kinostudio	Tirana	National Sports Centre	50	6th
Lushnja	Lushnjë	Fusha e Plugut		9th
Partizani	Tirana	Arena e Demave	4,500	5th
Teuta	Durrës	Aneksi Niko Dovana		3rd
Vllaznia	Shkodër	Reshit Rusi Stadium	1,200	Champion

== League table ==
Pos	Team	Pld	W	D	L	GF	GA	GD	Pts	Qualification or relegation
1	Teuta	8	7	0	1	66	3	+63	21	Qualification for the Champions League second qualifying round
2	Apolonia	8	7	0	1	46	5	+41	21	Qualification for the Europa Cup second qualifying round
3	Partizani	8	6	0	2	37	9	+28	18	
4	Vllaznia	8	5	0	3	47	5	+42	15	
5	Egnatia	8	4	0	4	28	22	+6	12	
6	Kinostudio	8	2	0	6	8	46	−38	6	
7	Atletik Klub	8	1	0	7	5	53	−48	3	
8	Lushnja	8	0	0	8	1	95	−94	0	

Updated to match(es) played on 22 November 2026. Source: Albanian Football Association
Rules for classification: 1) Points; 2) Head-to-head points; 3) Head-to-head goal difference; 4) Head-to-head goals scored; 5) Goal difference; 6) Goals scored; 7) Draw.

== Results ==
Clubs will play each other thrice, for a total of 21 matches each.

=== First half of season ===
Home \ Away	APO	ATL	EGN	KIN	LUS	PAR	TEU	VLL
Apolonia	—	7–0		9–0	14–1		3–1	
Atletik Klub		—	0–3	0–1			0–15	0–10
Egnatia	1–5		—		3–0	0–2	0–8	
Kinostudio			0–9	—	7–0	0–4	0–14	
Lushnja		0–5	0–12		—	0–15		0–18
Partizani	0–5	8–0		7–0		—		1–0
Teuta	2–0				21–0	4–0	—	1–0
Vllaznia	0–3	9–0	7–0	3–0				—

Updated to match(es) played on 22 November 2026. Source: Albanian Football Association
Legend: Blue = home team win; Yellow = draw; Red = away team win.

=== Second half of season ===
Home \ Away	APO	ATL	EGN	KIN	LUS	PAR	TEU	VLL
Apolonia	—							
Atletik Klub		—						
Egnatia			—					
Kinostudio				—				
Lushnja					—			
Partizani						—		
Teuta							—	
Vllaznia								—

First match(es) will be played: 2027. Source: Albanian Football Association
Legend: Blue = home team win; Yellow = draw; Red = away team win.

== Season statistics ==
=== Scoring ===
==== Top scorers ====
As of 22 November 2026

Rank	Player	Club	Goals
1	(Albania) Megi Doçi	Vllaznia	18
2	(Brazil) Bruna Tenutti	Apolonia	14
3	(Brazil) Marta Matos	Teuta	12
3	(Albania) Klaudja Borçi	Vllaznia	12
5	(Albania) Arlinda Kodra	Partizani	10
6	(Brazil) Edivania Lima Rodrigues	Teuta	7
6	(Brazil) Isabela Paixão	Teuta	7
6	(Albania) Alesja Çinaj	Egnatia	7
6	(Albania) Klea Hamonikaj	Teuta	7
10	(Ghana) Esther Owusu	Apolonia	6
10	(Albania) Anela Vishkulli	Teuta	6
12	(Albania) Erisa Alushaj	Partizani	5
12	(Albania) Xhesika Ndoj	Vllaznia	5
12	(Brazil) Ana Paula Nascimento	Teuta	5
12	(Albania) Vanesa Levenaj	Apolonia	5
12	(Albania) Gurie Memetaj	Egnatia	5
