= 2025–26 in Albanian football =

Football in Albania
- Season: 2025–26

== League competitions ==
League Division	Promoted to league ▲	Relegated from league ▼
Kategoria Superiore	Vora ▲; Flamurtari ▲	Skënderbeu ▼; Laçi ▼
Kategoria e Parë	Iliria ▲	Valbona ▼; Erzeni ▼
Kategoria e Dytë	Eagle FA ▲; Partizani B ▲; Shiroka ▲; Bylis ▲	Murlani ▼; Turbina ▼; Memaliaj ▼

=== Kategoria Superiore ===
Pos	Team	Pld	W	D	L	GF	GA	GD	Pts	Qualification or relegation
1	Vllaznia	28	15	7	6	36	21	+15	52	Qualification for the Final four round
2	Elbasani	28	14	10	4	35	22	+13	52	Qualification for the Final four round
3	Egnatia	28	14	8	6	34	22	+12	50	Qualification for the Final four round
4	Partizani	28	12	7	9	31	31	0	43	Qualification for the Final four round
5	Dinamo City	28	10	9	9	31	23	+8	39	
6	Teuta	28	8	13	7	25	25	0	37	
7	Bylis	28	6	9	13	26	38	−12	27	
8	Vora	28	6	9	13	24	30	−6	27	Qualification for the relegation play-off
9	Tirana	28	5	9	14	21	41	−20	24	Relegation to the 2026–27 Kategoria e Parë
10	Flamurtari	28	5	9	14	26	36	−10	24	Relegation to the 2026–27 Kategoria e Parë

Updated to match(es) played on 15 March 2026. Source: Albanian Football Association
Rules for classification: 1) Points; 2) Head-to-head points; 3) Head-to-head goal difference; 4) Head-to-head goals scored; 5) Goal difference; 6) Goals scored; 7) Draw.

=== Kategoria e Parë ===
Pos	Team	Pld	W	D	L	GF	GA	GD	Pts	Promotion or relegation
1	Skënderbeu (X)	26	20	3	3	49	23	+26	63	Promotion to 2026–27 Kategoria Superiore
2	Laçi (X)	26	18	6	2	44	16	+28	60	Promotion to 2026–27 Kategoria Superiore
3	Pogradeci (X)	26	16	7	3	46	23	+23	55	Promotion play-off to 2026–27 Kategoria Superiore
4	Iliria	26	9	10	7	24	24	0	37	Promotion play-off to 2026–27 Kategoria Superiore
5	Kastrioti	26	9	6	11	32	39	−7	33	Promotion play-off to 2026–27 Kategoria Superiore
6	Burreli	26	8	9	9	19	27	−8	33	Promotion play-off to 2026–27 Kategoria Superiore
7	Besa	26	8	7	11	31	31	0	31	
8	Korabi	26	7	7	12	26	34	−8	28	
9	Apolonia	26	6	6	14	23	32	−9	24	Relegation play-out to 2026–27 Kategoria e Dytë
10	Lushnja	26	4	9	13	21	35	−14	21	Relegation play-out to 2026–27 Kategoria e Dytë
11	Luftëtari	26	3	12	11	24	35	−11	21	Relegation to 2026–27 Kategoria e Dytë
12	Kukësi	26	4	6	16	19	39	−20	18	Relegation to 2026–27 Kategoria e Dytë

Updated to match(es) played on 14 March 2026. Source:
Rules for classification: 1) Points; 2) Head-to-head points; 3) Head-to-head goal difference; 4) Head-to-head goals scored; 5) Goal difference; 6) Goals scored; 7) Draw.
(X) Assured of at least promotion play-offs.

=== Kategoria e Dytë ===
Pos	Team	Pld	W	D	L	GF	GA	GD	Pts	Promotion or relegation
1	Besëlidhja (X)	16	13	3	0	44	6	+38	42	Promotion to 2026–27 Kategoria e Parë
2	Sopoti (X)	16	12	3	1	37	9	+28	39	Play-off promotion to 2026–27 Kategoria e Parë
3	Shiroka (X)	17	12	2	3	40	12	+28	38	Play-off promotion to 2026–27 Kategoria e Parë
4	Erzeni	16	8	3	5	18	10	+8	27	Play-off promotion to 2026–27 Kategoria e Parë
5	Naftëtari	16	7	1	8	22	21	+1	22	Play-off promotion to 2026–27 Kategoria e Parë
6	Luzi 2008	17	7	0	10	25	29	−4	21	
7	Tërbuni	16	5	5	6	16	19	−3	20	
8	Veleçiku	17	5	4	8	27	30	−3	19	
9	Gramshi	16	4	4	8	20	29	−9	16	
10	Basania	16	2	4	10	20	39	−19	10	
11	Adriatiku (Q)	17	0	1	16	6	71	−65	1	Play-off relegation to 2026–27 Kategoria e Tretë
12	Valbona	0	0	0	0	0	0	0	0	Withdrew

Updated to match(es) played on 15 March 2026. Source:
Rules for classification: 1) points; 2) head-to-head points; 3) head-to-head goal difference; 4) goal difference; 5) number of goals scored; 6) draw. (Head-to-head record is applied for clubs with the same number of points only once all matches between said clubs have been played.)
(Q) Qualified for the phase indicated; (X) Team is assured of at least a play-off place, but can still qualify for automatic promotion.

Pos	Team	Pld	W	D	L	GF	GA	GD	Pts	Promotion or relegation
1	Oriku (X)	17	12	4	1	35	9	+26	40	Promotion to 2026–27 Kategoria e Parë
2	Butrinti (X)	16	11	2	3	27	11	+16	35	Play-off promotion to 2026–27 Kategoria e Parë
3	Bylis B (X)	17	10	5	2	31	17	+14	35	Play-off promotion to 2026–27 Kategoria e Parë
4	Partizani B (X)	16	10	3	3	40	14	+26	33	Play-off promotion to 2026–27 Kategoria e Parë
5	Maliqi	16	6	3	7	20	23	−3	21	Play-off promotion to 2026–27 Kategoria e Parë
6	Delvina	16	6	1	9	23	30	−7	19	
7	Tomori	17	5	3	9	18	25	−7	18	
8	Devolli	17	5	2	10	18	39	−21	17	
9	Eagle FA	16	3	5	8	20	33	−13	14	
10	Shkumbini	16	3	3	10	20	29	−9	12	Play-off relegation to 2026–27 Kategoria e Tretë
11	Këlcyra	16	2	3	11	13	35	−22	9	Relegation to 2026–27 Kategoria e Tretë

Updated to match(es) played on 15 March 2026. Source:
Rules for classification: 1) points; 2) head-to-head points; 3) head-to-head goal difference; 4) goal difference; 5) number of goals scored; 6) draw. (Head-to-head record is applied for clubs with the same number of points only once all matches between said clubs have been played.)
(X) Team is assured of at least a play-off place, but can still qualify for automatic promotion

=== Kategoria e Tretë ===
Pos	Team	Pld	W	D	L	GF	GA	GD	Pts	Promotion
1	Dinamo City B	11	9	2	0	47	4	+43	29	Promotion to 2026–27 Kategoria e Dytë
2	Vllaznia B	8	7	1	0	39	8	+31	22	Play-off promotion to 2026–27 Kategoria e Dytë
3	T-Kamza	11	7	1	3	32	27	+5	22	
4	Tirana B	10	4	3	3	35	12	+23	15	
5	Bulqiza	10	4	2	4	23	16	+7	14	
6	Shënkolli	10	4	0	6	24	32	−8	12	
7	Shkodra	10	2	4	4	16	36	−20	10	
8	Kamza Sport	11	0	4	7	11	38	−27	4	
9	Rinia EL	11	0	1	10	14	68	−54	1	
10	Klosi (Note: Klosi withdrew from the competition after the 11th round. Their results were annulled.)	0	0	0	0	0	0	0	0	Withdrew
11	Young Boys (Note: Young Boys withdrew from the competition after the 11th round. Their results were annulled.)	0	0	0	0	0	0	0	0	Withdrew

Updated to match(es) played on 16 March 2026. Source:
Rules for classification: 1) points; 2) head-to-head points; 3) head-to-head goal difference; 4) goal difference; 5) number of goals scored; 6) draw. (Head-to-head record is applied for clubs with the same number of points only once all matches between said clubs have been played.)
Notes:

Pos	Team	Pld	W	D	L	GF	GA	GD	Pts	Promotion
1	Albpetrol	10	8	2	0	28	3	+25	26	Promotion to 2026–27 Kategoria e Dytë
2	Përmeti	11	5	5	1	15	7	+8	20	Play-off promotion to 2026–27 Kategoria e Dytë
3	Memaliaj	10	6	1	3	23	14	+9	19	
4	Apolonia B	10	5	0	5	22	32	−10	15	
5	Osumi	11	3	3	5	10	10	0	12	
6	Skrapari	11	3	3	5	18	21	−3	12	
7	Turbina	10	2	4	4	7	13	−6	10	
8	Tepelena	10	2	3	5	14	18	−4	9	
9	Gramozi	9	1	1	7	6	25	−19	4	
10	Teuta B	0	0	0	0	0	0	0	0	Withdrew

Updated to match(es) played on 15 March 2026. Source:
Rules for classification: 1) points; 2) head-to-head points; 3) head-to-head goal difference; 4) goal difference; 5) number of goals scored; 6) draw. (Head-to-head record is applied for clubs with the same number of points only once all matches between said clubs have been played.)

=== Kategoria Superiore Femra ===
Pos	Team	Pld	W	D	L	GF	GA	GD	Pts	Qualification or relegation
1	Vllaznia	10	10	0	0	78	2	+76	30	Qualification for the Final four round
2	Gramshi	11	8	1	2	85	8	+77	25	Qualification for the Final four round
3	Apolonia	10	8	1	1	53	4	+49	25	Qualification for the Final four round
4	Teuta	11	7	0	4	67	10	+57	21	Qualification for the Final four round
5	Partizani	10	5	0	5	19	21	−2	15	
6	Kinostudio	11	3	1	7	14	57	−43	10	
7	Egnatia	11	2	1	8	25	44	−19	7	
8	Atletik Klub	11	2	1	8	6	73	−67	7	
9	Lushnja	11	0	1	10	1	129	−128	1	

Updated to match(es) played on 15 March 2026. Source: Albanian Football Association
Rules for classification: 1) Points; 2) Head-to-head points; 3) Head-to-head goal difference; 4) Head-to-head goals scored; 5) Goal difference; 6) Goals scored; 7) Draw.

== UEFA competitions ==
=== UEFA Champions League ===
==== Qualifying phase ====
===== Egnatia =====
First qualifying round
Team 1	Agg.	Team 2	1st leg	2nd leg
Egnatia (Albania)	1–5	(Iceland) Breiðablik	1–0	0–5

=== UEFA Conference League ===
==== Qualifying phase ====
===== Dinamo City =====
Second qualifying round
Team 1	Agg.	Team 2	1st leg	2nd leg
Atlètic Club d'Escaldes (Andorra)	2–3	(Albania) Dinamo City	1–2	1–1

Third qualifying round
Team 1	Agg.	Team 2	1st leg	2nd leg
Hajduk Split (Croatia)	3–4	(Albania) Dinamo City	2–1	1–3 (a.e.t.)

Play-off round
Team 1	Agg.	Team 2	1st leg	2nd leg
Jagiellonia Białystok (Poland)	4–1	(Albania) Dinamo City	3–0	1–1

===== Egnatia =====
Second qualifying round
Team 1	Agg.	Team 2	1st leg	2nd leg
Dinamo Minsk (Belarus)	0–3	(Albania) Egnatia	0–2	0–1

Third qualifying round
Team 1	Agg.	Team 2	1st leg	2nd leg
Olimpija Ljubljana (Slovenia)	4–2	(Albania) Egnatia	0–0	4–2 (a.e.t.)

===== Partizani =====
First qualifying round
Team 1	Agg.	Team 2	1st leg	2nd leg
Nõmme Kalju (Estonia)	2–1	(Albania) Partizani	1–1	1–0 (a.e.t.)

===== Vllaznia =====
First qualifying round
Team 1	Agg.	Team 2	1st leg	2nd leg
Vllaznia (Albania)	4–3	(Latvia) Daugavpils	0–1	4–2

Second qualifying round
Team 1	Agg.	Team 2	1st leg	2nd leg
Vllaznia (Albania)	4–5	(Iceland) Víkingur Reykjavík	2–1	2–4 (a.e.t.)

=== UEFA Women's Champions League ===
==== Qualifying rounds ====
===== Vllaznia =====
Semi-finals
27 August
(Hungary) Ferencváros	3
(Luxembourg) Racing Union	0
27 August
(Albania) Vllaznia	1
(Belarus) Dinamo Minsk	2

Final
30 August
(Hungary) Ferencváros	4
(Belarus) Dinamo Minsk	0
Third place
30 August
(Luxembourg) Racing Union	1
(Albania) Vllaznia	3

== National teams ==
=== Men's senior ===
==== Results and fixtures ====
===== Friendlies =====
4 September 2025	Gibraltar	0–1	Albania	Europa Point, Gibraltar
18:00 UTC+2		Report	Asani 69' (pen.)	Stadium: Europa Sports Park; Referee: Aaron Wyn Jones (Wales)

14 October 2025	Albania	v	Jordan	Tirana, Albania
18:00 UTC+2		Report		Stadium: Arena Kombëtare

===== 2026 FIFA World Cup qualification =====
====== Group K ======
Pos	Team	Pld	W	D	L	GF	GA	GD	Pts	Qualification	(England)	(Albania)	(Serbia)	(Latvia)	(Andorra)
1	England	8	8	0	0	22	0	+22	24	Qualification for 2026 FIFA World Cup	—	2–0	2–0	3–0	2–0
2	Albania	8	4	2	2	7	5	+2	14	Advance to play-offs	0–2	—	0–0	1–0	3–0
3	Serbia	8	4	1	3	9	10	−1	13		0–5	0–1	—	2–1	3–0
4	Latvia	8	1	2	5	5	15	−10	5		0–5	1–1	0–1	—	2–2
5	Andorra	8	0	1	7	3	16	−13	1		0–1	0–1	1–3	0–1	—

Source: FIFA, UEFA
Rules for classification: Tiebreakers

9 September 2025 5	Albania	1–0	Latvia	Tirana, Albania
20:45 CEST	Asllani 25' (pen.)	Report (FIFA); Report (UEFA)		Stadium: Arena Kombëtare; Attendance: 16,568; Referee: Damian Sylwestrzak (Poland)

11 October 2025 6	Serbia	0–1	Albania	Leskovac, Serbia
20:45 CEST		Report (FIFA); Report (UEFA)	Manaj 45+1'	Stadium: Dubočica Stadium; Attendance: 4,320; Referee: István Kovács (Romania)

13 November 2025 7	Andorra	v	Albania	Encamp, Andorra
20:45 CET		Report (FIFA); Report (UEFA)		Stadium: Estadi de la FAF

16 November 2025 8	Albania	v	England	Tirana, Andorra
18:00 CET		Report (FIFA); Report (UEFA)		Stadium: Arena Kombëtare

=== Women's senior ===
==== Results and fixtures ====
===== 2025 UEFA Women's Nations League =====
====== Promotion/relegation matches ======
24 October 2025	Cyprus	v	Albania	Larnaca, Cyprus
19:00 EEST		Report		Stadium: Antonis Papadopoulos Stadium

28 October 2025	Albania	v	Cyprus	Tirana, Albania
18:00 CET		Report		Stadium: Arena Kombëtare

=== Men's under-21 ===
==== Results and fixtures ====
===== Friendlies =====
5 September 2025	Albania	0–2	Germany	Elbasan, Albania
18:30		Report	Ansah 48'; Pejčinović 52'	Stadium: Elbasan Arena

8 September 2025	Switzerland	2–1	Albania	Aarau, Albania
18:30	Konietzke 27'; Jukaj 81' (o.g.)	Report	Shehu 62'	Stadium: Stadion Brügglifeld

10 September 2025	Albania	2–0	San Marino	Tirana, Albania
17:00	Dodaj 21'; Fetai 52'	Report		Stadium: Arena Kombëtare

=== Men's under-19 ===
==== Results and fixtures ====
===== Friendlies =====
5 August 2025	Italy	4–1	Albania	Novara, Italy
	Pellini 9'; Maffessoli 15'; Artesani 42'; Mosconi 48'	Report	B. Krasniqi 5'	Stadium: Novarello Sporting Center

7 August 2025	Italy	1–1	Albania	Novara, Italy
	Orlandi 28'	Report	Dashi 60'	Stadium: Novarello Sporting Center

4 September 2025	Albania	0–1	Moldova	Tirana, Albania
		Report	Tonica 42'	Stadium: Shtëpia e Futbollit

8 September 2025	Albania	0–1	Kosovo	Tirana, Albania
		Report	Llumnica 74'	Stadium: Shtëpia e Futbollit

10 October 2025	Albania	2–1	Republic of Ireland	Tirana, Albania
	Huqi 36'; Nuredini 87' (pen.)	Report	O’Sullivan 76'	Stadium: Shtëpia e Futbollit

12 October 2025	Albania	2–2	Republic of Ireland	Luz i Vogël, Albania
	Nuredini 62'; Kulla 69'	Report	Mare 52'; Otegabayo 90+2'	Stadium: Luz i Vogël Stadium

===== 2026 UEFA European Under-19 Championship qualification =====
====== Group 5 ======
Pos	Team	Pld	W	D	L	GF	GA	GD	Pts	Qualification
1	Ukraine	3	3	0	0	9	0	+9	9	Elite round
2	Slovakia	3	1	1	1	3	3	0	4	Elite round
3	Montenegro	3	1	0	2	1	6	−5	3	
4	Albania (H)	3	0	1	2	0	4	−4	1	

Source: UEFA
Rules for classification: Tiebreakers
(H) Hosts

12 November 2025 1	Ukraine	v	Albania	Elbasan, Albania
		Report		Stadium: Elbasan Arena

15 November 2025 2	Slovakia	v	Albania	Elbasan, Albania
		Report		Stadium: Elbasan Arena

18 November 2025 3	Albania	v	Montenegro	Elbasan, Albania
		Report		Stadium: Elbasan Arena

=== Women's under-19 ===
==== Results and fixtures ====
===== 2026 UEFA Women's Under-19 Championship qualification =====
====== First round ======
25 November 2025 1	Albania	v	Luxembourg	Tirana, Albania
		Report		Stadium: Arena Kombëtare

28 November 2025 2	Slovakia	v	Albania	Tirana, Albania
		Report		Stadium: Arena Kombëtare

1 December 2025 3	Liechtenstein	v	Albania	Tirana, Albania
		Report		Stadium: Arena Kombëtare

=== Men's under-17 ===
==== Results and fixtures ====
===== Friendlies =====
12 August 2025	Italy	4–1	Albania	Florence, Italy
	Pirola 29'; Giammattei 45'; Perillo 89'; Guaglianone 90+2'	Report	Vata 20'	Stadium: Centro Tecnico Federale di Coverciano

14 August 2025	Italy	6–0	Albania	Florence, Italy
	Perillo 8', 50'; Donato 28'; Pisati 41'; Fabbri 57'; Petrone 84'	Report		Stadium: Centro Tecnico Federale di Coverciano

4 September 2025 2025 Syrenka Cup	Poland	1–1	Albania	Grodzisk Mazowiecki, Poland
	Smyrak 6'	Report	Himallari 67'	Stadium: GKS Pogon Stadium

6 September 2025 2025 Syrenka Cup	Albania	1–0	Norway	Sulejówek, Poland
	Luka 72'	Report		Stadium: Sulejówek Municipal Stadium

9 September 2025 2025 Syrenka Cup	Albania	0–3	Romania	Radom, Poland
	Marincean 23'; Bota 48'; Niculcea 83'	Report		Stadium: Municipal Stadium Marszałka Józefa Piłsudskiego

9 October 2025	Albania	1–3	Slovenia	Tirana, Albania
	Allasufi 90+2'	Report	Koren 54'; Okanović 58'; Kotar 72'	Stadium: Shtëpia e Futbollit

11 October 2025	Albania	0–3	Slovenia	Tirana, Albania
		Report	Koren 52' (pen.), 86'; Matjašec 84'	Stadium: Shtëpia e Futbollit

===== 2026 UEFA European Under-17 Championship qualification =====
====== First round ======
11 November 2025 1	Albania	v	Netherlands	Kotoriba, Croatia
		Report		Stadium: Sportski Park Kotoriba

14 November 2025 2	Croatia	v	Albania	Nedelišće, Croatia
		Report		Stadium: SRP Trate

17 November 2025 3	Kazakhstan	v	Albania	Nedelišće, Croatia
		Report		Stadium: SRP Trate

=== Women's under-17 ===
==== Results and fixtures ====
===== 2026 UEFA Women's Under-17 Championship qualification =====
====== First round ======
17 October 2025 1	Greece	v	Albania	Elbasan, Albania
		Report		Stadium: Elbasan Arena

20 October 2025 2	Estonia	v	Albania	Elbasan, Albania
		Report		Stadium: Elbasan Arena

23 October 2025 3	Albania	v	Israel	Elbasan, Albania
		Report		Stadium: Elbasan Arena
