= 2025–26 Kategoria Superiore Femra =

Kategoria Superiore Femra
- Season: 2025–26
- Dates: 27 September 2025 – 29 May 2026
- Champions: Vllaznia; 13th title
- Women's Champions League: Vllaznia; Apolonia
- Matches: 76
- Goals: 512 (6.74 per match)
- Top goalscorer: Megi Doçi (47 goals)
- Biggest home win: Teuta 28–0 Lushnja (14 February 2026)
- Biggest away win: Lushnja 0–19 Gramshi (22 February 2026)
- Highest scoring: Teuta 28–0 Lushnja (14 February 2026)
- Longest winning run: 13 matches Vllaznia
- Longest unbeaten run: 19 matches Vllaznia
- Longest winless run: 16 matches Lushnja
- Longest losing run: 13 matches Lushnja
- All statistics correct as of 29 May 2026.

The 2025–26 Kategoria Superiore Femra was the 17th official season of top-tier women's football in Albania. The season began on 27 September 2025 and ended on 29 May 2026.

The winners and runners-up of this season's Kategoria Superiore Femra each earned a place in the second qualifying round of the 2026–27 UEFA Women's Champions League.

== Teams ==
=== Locations ===
2025–26 Kategoria Superiore Femra teams.

Team	Home city	Stadium	Capacity	2024–25 season
Apolonia	Fier	Apolonia Academy		4th
Atletik Klub	Shkodër	Zmijani Complex		−
Egnatia	Rrogozhinë	Kompleksi Sportiv Egnatia		5th
Gramshi	Gramsh	Kompleksi Sportiv FC Dinamo		3rd
Kinostudio	Tirana	National Sports Centre	50	6th
Lushnja	Lushnjë	Fusha e Plugut		10th
Partizani	Tirana	Arena e Demave	4,500	2nd
Teuta	Durrës	Niko Dovana Stadium	12,040	9th
Vllaznia	Shkodër	Reshit Rusi Stadium	1,200	Champion

== League table ==
Pos	Team	Pld	W	D	L	GF	GA	GD	Pts	Qualification or relegation
1	Vllaznia (C)	16	15	1	0	124	3	+121	46	Qualification for the Final four round
2	Apolonia	16	12	2	2	84	8	+76	38	Qualification for the Final four round
3	Gramshi	16	11	2	3	100	11	+89	35	Qualification for the Final four round
4	Teuta	16	10	1	5	76	15	+61	31	Qualification for the Final four round
5	Partizani	16	8	0	8	31	32	−1	24	
6	Kinostudio	16	5	1	10	27	83	−56	16	
7	Egnatia	16	4	1	11	45	58	−13	13	
8	Atletik Klub	16	2	1	13	8	104	−96	7	
9	Lushnja	16	0	1	15	2	183	−181	1	

Source: Albanian Football Association
Rules for classification: 1) Points; 2) Head-to-head points; 3) Head-to-head goal difference; 4) Head-to-head goals scored; 5) Goal difference; 6) Goals scored; 7) Draw.
(C) Champions

== Results ==
Clubs played each other twice, for a total of 16 matches each.

Home \ Away	APO	ATL	EGN	GRA	KIN	LUS	PAR	TEU	VLL
Apolonia	—	15–0	4–0	0–1	9–1	15–0	1–0	2–1	0–2
Atletik Klub	0–10	—	0–7	0–8	4–1	1–0	0–5	0–8	0–8
Egnatia	0–2	6–0	—	0–4	4–4	13–0	1–2	2–5	0–7
Gramshi	1–1	15–0	6–0	—	2–0	18–0	5–0	1–1	1–5
Kinostudio	0–8	5–0	3–1	0–14	—	3–0	0–2	0–2	0–14
Lushnja	1–10	0–0	1–11	0–19	0–9	—	0–4	0–10	0–15
Partizani	0–3	4–2	4–0	0–4	0–1	9–0	—	0–3	0–2
Teuta	0–3	3–0	5–0	2–1	8–0	28–0	0–1	—	0–4
Vllaznia	1–1	9–1	11–0	2–0	15–0	18–0	10–0	1–0	—

Source: Albanian Football Association
Legend: Blue = home team win; Yellow = draw; Red = away team win.

== Final four round ==
A draw is conducted in order to decide the semi-finals. Seeding of teams is based on their league ranking, with two seeded teams and two unseeded.

=== Bracket ===
Semi-finals
Gramshi	0	1	1
Vllaznia	1	6	7
Teuta	1	0	1
Apolonia (b.p.)	1	0	1

Final
Vllaznia	2
Apolonia	0
Third place play-off
Teuta (a.e.t.)	4
Gramshi	2

=== Semi-finals ===
17 May 2026
15:00

Gramshi	0−1	Vllaznia
		Borçi 55'

Kompleksi Sportiv FC Dinamo, Arbanë
Referee: Ermis Çelaj
23 May 2026
13:00

Vllaznia	6−1	Gramshi
Bajraktari 31'; Deda 37', 54'; Doçi 43' (pen.), 86'; Behrami 84' (o.g.)		Berisha 55'

Reshit Rusi Stadium, Shkodër
Referee: Egli Spahiu

17 May 2026
17:00

Teuta	1−1	Apolonia
Ana Paula 68'		Hamonikaj 28'

Niko Dovana Stadium, Durrës
Referee: Emanuela Rusta
23 May 2026
16:00

Apolonia	0−0	Teuta

Loni Papuçiu Stadium, Fier
Referee: Albert Doda

=== Third place play-off ===
28 May 2026
17:00

Teuta	4−2 (a.e.t.)	Gramshi

Shtëpia e Futbollit, Tirana

=== Final ===
29 May 2026
16:00

Vllaznia	2−0	Apolonia
Doçi 32'; Deda 81'

Selman Stërmasi Stadium, Tirana
Referee: Eglantina Pjetrushaj

== Season statistics ==
=== Scoring ===
==== Top scorers ====
As of 29 May 2026

Rank	Player	Club	Goals
1	(Albania) Megi Doçi	Vllaznia	47
2	(United States) Teresa Deda	Vllaznia	24
3	(Costa Rica) Julia García	Gramshi	19
4	(Albania) Anela Vishkulli	Teuta	16
4	(Albania) Klea Hamonikaj	Apolonia	16
6	(Brazil) Bruna Tenutti	Apolonia	15
