= 2024–25 Albanian Women's Cup =

Tournament details
- Country: Albania
- Dates: 28 January – 24 May 2025
- Teams: 9

Final positions
- Champions: Apolonia Fier (2nd title)
- Runners-up: Egnatia Rrogozhinë

Tournament statistics
- Matches played: 14
- Goals scored: 65 (4.64 per match)

The 2024–25 Albanian Women's Cup was the 16th season of the Albanian Women's Cup. The final was played on 24 May 2025. Defending champions Apolonia Fier won the tournament for the second time, defeating Egnatia Rrogozhinë in the final.

== Teams ==
Round	Number of fixtures	Clubs remaining
Group stage	9	9 → 4
Semi-finals	4	4 → 2
Final	1	2 → 1

== Group stage ==
=== Group A ===
Pos	Team	Pld	W	D	L	GF	GA	GD	Pts	Qualification
1	Apolonia Fier	2	1	0	1	6	4	+2	3	Advance to Knockout stage
2	Partizani Tirana	2	1	0	1	4	5	−1	3	
3	Gramshi	2	1	0	1	2	3	−1	3	

Source: FSHF

28 January 2025	Gramshi	2–0	Partizani Tirana
14:00	28'; Begallo 51'	Report		Referee: Emanuela Rusta

1 February 2025	Apolonia Fier	3–0	Gramshi
13:00	Hamonikaj 2'; Ukwuoma 19'; 42'	Report		Referee: Mirela Cemeri

12 February 2025	Partizani Tirana	4–3	Apolonia Fier
14:00	Dos Santos 3'; 19'; Kora 35', 56'	Report	Vishkulli 4'; 54', 60'	Referee: Kejsi Tafili

=== Group B ===
Pos	Team	Pld	W	D	L	GF	GA	GD	Pts	Qualification
1	Egnatia Rrogozhinë	2	2	0	0	7	2	+5	6	Advance to Knockout stage
2	Kinostudio	2	1	0	1	8	5	+3	3	Advance to Knockout stage
3	Laçi	2	0	0	2	1	9	−8	0	

Source: FSHF

28 January 2025	Kinostudio	6–1	Laçi
13:00	Habili 18', 56'; Baftia 51', 89'; Tori 58'	Report	Stalaj 74'	Referee: Keljsi Tafili

2 February 2025	Egnatia Rrogozhinë	4–2	Kinostudio
12:30	Muca 16'; Zogu 21', 28'; Kostaj 67'	Report	Doce 35'; Kadiolli 45+1'	Referee: Orjola Zagolli

9 February 2025	Laçi	0–3	Egnatia Rrogozhinë
		Report	Banushi 5'; Mbrati 86'	Referee: Mirela Cemeri

=== Group C ===
Pos	Team	Pld	W	D	L	GF	GA	GD	Pts	Qualification
1	Tirana	2	2	0	0	9	3	+6	6	Advance to Knockout stage
2	Teuta	2	0	1	1	3	4	−1	1	
3	Lushnja	2	0	1	1	0	5	−5	1	

Source: FSHF

28 January 2025	Tirana	5–0	Lushnja
	Maksuti 54', 67'; Likollari 58', 60'; Mile 69'	Report		Referee: Eglantina Pjetrushaj

2 February 2025	Teuta	3–4	Tirana
	Hysa 49', 57'; Bajramaj 52'	Report	Balla 12'; Klleci 18', 71'; Ferati 20'	Referee: Disela Lekgegaj

9 February 2025	Lushnja	0–0	Teuta
		Report		Referee: Klea Kullolli

=== Ranking of second-placed teams ===
Pos	Grp	Team	Pld	W	D	L	GF	GA	GD	Pts	Qualification
1	B	Kinostudio	2	1	0	1	8	5	+3	3	Advance to Knockout stage
2	A	Partizani Tirana	2	1	0	1	4	5	−1	3	
3	C	Teuta	2	0	1	1	3	4	−1	1	

Source: FSHF

== Knockout stage ==
=== Semi-finals ===
19 April 2025	Egnatia Rrogozhinë	4–1	Tirana
12:00	Zogu 23', 90'; Banushi 33'	Report	Kaçorri 28'	Referee: Mirela Cemeri

23 April 2025	Tirana	0–3 (1–7 agg.)	Egnatia Rrogozhinë
13:00		Report	Zogu 32', 72'; Muca 60'	Referee: Orjola Zagolli

19 April 2025	Kinostudio	0–5	Apolonia Fier
14:00		Report	Levendi 29', 73'; 54'; Hamonikaj 77'	Referee: Klea Kullolli

23 April 2025	Apolonia Fier	6–0 (11–0 agg.)	Kinostudio
14:00	Levendi 11', 34'; Vishkulli 16', 89'; 24'; Ndoj 59'	Report		Referee: Mirela Cemeri

=== Final ===
24 May 2025
17:00

Apolonia Fier	5–1	Egnatia Rrogozhinë
Bruna Tenutti 4', 8'; Hamonikaj 17'; Áhlice Guedes 19'; Levendi 84'	Report	Puca 73'

Referee: Klea Kulloli
