= Lavdie Begolli =

Albanian footballer (born 1993)

Personal information
- Date of birth: 19 January 1993 (age 33)
- Place of birth: Pristina, FR Yugoslavia
- Position: Midfielder

Senior career*
Years	Team	Apps	(Gls)
2013	Juban Danja		
2013–2014	Tirana AS		
2014–2016	Vllaznia		
2016–2017	Hajvalia		
2017–2019	JyPK	63	(22)
2020–2024	KuPS	80	(53)

International career^{‡}
2017–2022	Albania	11	(1)
- * Club domestic league appearances and goals as of 24 June 2024 ‡ National team caps and goals as of 24 June 2024

Lavdie "Lavi" Begolli (also Lavdije; born 19 January 1993) is a footballer who plays as a midfielder. Born in Kosovo, she has appeared for the Albania national team.

== Career ==
Begolli began her senior career with KFF Juban Danja in the 2012–13 Albanian Women's National Championship. She played for KFF Tirana AS during the 2013–14 Albanian Women's National Championship and then for KFF Vllaznia Shkodër in the 2014–15 and 2015–16 Albanian Women's National Championships.

On 30 June 2016, she transferred from Vllaznia to KFF Hajvalia in the Kosovo Women's Football League.

On 2 April 2017, Begolli transferred to Jyväskylän Pallokerho (JyPS) in the Finnish Naisten Liiga (renamed 'Kansallinen Liiga' in 2019). She played for JyPS from 2017 to 2019 and recorded 22 goals in 63 match appearances.

After three seasons with JyPS, she transferred to Kuopion Palloseura (KuPS) in January 2020. Begolli was the top scorer of the Kansallinen Liiga in 2022, with 25 goals in 19 matches.

=== National team ===
Begolli played for the national team during the 2019 FIFA Women's World Cup qualifying cycle.

== Personal life ==
Begolli was born on 19 January 1993 to a Kosovar family living in Pristina, Federal Republic of Yugoslavia. She is a citizen of the Republic of Kosovo and a naturalized citizen of the Republic of Albania.

The Kosovo War began in 1998, when Begolli was five years old, and she experienced the horrors of war both in Pristina and as she and her family fled on foot to a refugee camp in Macedonia. They remained in Macedonia for a time before traveling via Slovenia to Germany, where they settled until it became possible to return to Pristina two years later.

She began attending a culinary school in Kuopio in 2021 and has expressed a desire to work in a restaurant or open a restaurant of her own after her football career has concluded.

== See also ==
- List of Albania women's international footballers
