= 2016–17 Kategoria Superiore Femra =

Kategoria Superiore Femra
- Season: 2016–17
- Dates: 22 September 2016 – 7 May 2017
- Champions: Vllaznia (4th title)
- Champions League: Vllaznia
- Matches: 90
- Goals: 618 (6.87 per match)
- Top goalscorer: Megi Doçi - Uendi Muja (58 Goals)
- Biggest home win: Kinostudio 30–0 The Door (22 April 2017)
- Biggest away win: The Door 0–20 Vllaznia (17 December 2016)
- Highest scoring: Kinostudio 30–0 The Door (22 April 2017)
- Longest winning run: 20 matches Vllaznia
- Longest unbeaten run: 20 matches Vllaznia
- Longest winless run: 20 matches The Door
- Longest losing run: 20 matches The Door

The 2016–17 Kategoria Superiore Femra was the 8th season of women's professional football, organized by the Albanian Football Federation.

Vllaznia secured their fourth league title after an unbeaten season – winning all 18 games whilst scoring 153 and only conceding one goal.

Locations of teams from the 2016–17 season

== League table ==
Pos	Team	Pld	W	D	L	GF	GA	GD	Pts
1	Vllaznia (Note: Vllaznia qualified to the UEFA Champions League qualifying round.) (C)	18	18	0	0	153	1	+152	54
2	Apolonia	18	14	2	2	77	13	+64	44
3	Kinostudio	18	13	2	3	146	23	+123	41
4	AAS	18	11	1	6	66	46	+20	34
5	Tirana AS	18	8	1	9	49	46	+3	25
6	Teuta	18	7	2	9	31	47	−16	23
7	Juban Danja	18	7	1	10	48	73	−25	22
8	Skënderbeu	18	4	1	13	13	100	−87	13
9	Dajti	18	3	0	15	22	91	−69	9
10	The Door	18	0	0	18	13	178	−165	0

Updated to match(es) played on 7 May 2017. Source:
(C) Champions

== Results ==
Home \ Away	AAS	APF	DAJ	THD	JUB	KIN	SKË	TEU	TAS	VLL
AAS	—	0–1	3–1	18–3	3–1	0–5	3–0	7–0	1–1	0–8
Apolonia	3–1	—	6–0	10–0	8–1	1–1	5–0	5–0	7–0	0–2
Dajti	2–4	0–2	—	3–1	4–2	0–3	0–2	1–3	0–6	0–19
The Door	3–12	0–7	1–7	—	1–11	2–15	0–4	1–5	0–6	0–20
Juban Danja	1–6	2–5	2–0	9–0	—	1–8	4–0	2–2	3–2	0–12
FC Kinostudio	7–0	3–3	12–1	30–0	8–0	—	22–0	6–1	1–2	1–6
Skënderbeu	0–3	0–6	2–1	4–1	1–3	0–12	—	0–0	0–2	0–15
Teuta	2–3	0–1	2–1	3–0	3–1	1–3	7–0	—	2–0	0–3
Tirana AS	1–2	1–7	8–1	10–0	3–5	0–9	6–0	1–0	—	0–3
Vllaznia	7–0	2–0	13–0	4–0	7–0	5–0	10–0	12–0	5–0	—

Updated to match(es) played on 7 May 2017. Source: Soccerway
Legend: Blue = home team win; Yellow = draw; Red = away team win.
For upcoming matches, an "a" indicates there is an article about the rivalry between the two participants.
