= 2018–19 Kategoria Superiore Femra =

Kategoria Superiore Femra
- Season: 2018–19
- Dates: 15 September 2018 – 2 June 2019
- Champions: Vllaznia (6th title)
- Champions League: Vllaznia
- Matches: 132
- Goals: 939 (7.11 per match)
- Top goalscorer: Megi Doçi (79)
- Biggest home win: Kinostudio 22–0 Pogradeci (6 April 2019)
- Biggest away win: Bilisht Sport 0–21 Kinostudio (24 November 2018)
- Highest scoring: Kinostudio 22–0 Pogradeci (6 April 2019)
- Longest winning run: 22 matches Vllaznia
- Longest unbeaten run: 22 matches Vllaznia
- Longest winless run: 19 matches Bilisht Sport
- Longest losing run: 19 matches Bilisht Sport

The 2018–19 Kategoria Superiore Femra was the 10th season of women's professional football, organized by the Albanian Football Federation.

Locations of teams from the 2018–19 season

== League table ==
Pos	Team	Pld	W	D	L	GF	GA	GD	Pts
1	Vllaznia (Note: Vllaznia qualified to the UEFA Champions League qualifying round.) (C)	22	22	0	0	149	3	+146	66
2	Tirana AS	22	18	1	3	139	25	+114	55
3	Apolonia	22	17	1	4	155	30	+125	52
4	Kinostudio	22	17	0	5	154	36	+118	51
5	Juban Danja	22	12	2	8	73	53	+20	38
6	Term (Note: Term were deducted 3 points after failing to show up in a match against Apolonia.)	22	12	1	9	73	41	+32	34
7	Teuta	22	10	1	11	86	65	+21	31
8	AAS	22	8	0	14	50	68	−18	24
9	Dajti	22	7	0	15	24	105	−81	21
10	Maliqi	22	3	0	19	17	143	−126	9
11	Pogradeci	22	2	0	20	11	177	−166	6
12	Bilisht Sport	22	1	0	21	8	193	−185	3

Updated to match(es) played on 2 June 2019. Source:
(C) Champions

== Results ==
Home \ Away	AAS	APF	BIL	DAJ	JUB	KIN	MLQ	POG	TRM	TEU	TAS	VLL
AAS	—	1–5	6–0	5–0	2–3	2–6	4–1	11–0	2–3	2–4	0–3	0–5
Apolonia	6–0	—	17–0	15–0	4–1	3–0	18–0	13–0	3–0	4–0	2–2	1–6
Bilisht Sport	0–5	1–18	—	1–4	0–4	0–21	1–5	0–1	0–6	1–8	0–17	0–10
Dajti	1–0	0–8	4–0	—	0–7	0–8	1–0	5–0	0–3	0–9	0–7	0–7
Juban Danja	5–1	2–5	6–0	4–2	—	1–6	3–0	9–0	1–1	3–3	1–4	0–6
FC Kinostudio	4–0	4–3	13–0	7–1	6–1	—	11–0	22–0	3–2	7–4	1–4	0–5
Maliqi	0–3	2–9	1–4	0–1	0–6	0–14	—	3–1	1–3	2–5	0–8	0–8
Pogradeci	0–4	0–10	5–1	1–4	0–11	0–15	1–2	—	1–5	1–8	0–10	0–9
Term	0–2	1–0	13–0	5–0	1–2	0–4	10–0	3–0	—	6–2	0–3	1–7
Teuta	6–0	4–5	12–0	3–1	0–2	0–1	7–0	9–0	0–9	—	2–5	0–5
Tirana AS	9–0	1–5	10–0	6–0	5–1	3–1	15–0	14–0	3–1	9–0	—	1–3
Vllaznia	7–0	6–0	6–0	9–0	7–0	7–0	10–0	9–0	7–0	2–0	8–0	—

Updated to match(es) played on 2 June 2019. Source:
Legend: Blue = home team win; Yellow = draw; Red = away team win.
For upcoming matches, an "a" indicates there is an article about the rivalry between the two participants.
