= 2015–16 Kategoria Superiore Femra =

Kategoria Superiore Femra
- Season: 2015–16
- Matches: 90
- Goals: 541 (6.01 per match)
- Top goalscorer: Sara Begallo (47)

The 2015–16 Kategoria Superiore Femra was the 7th season of top-tier women's professional football in Albania, organized by the Albanian Football Federation.

Locations of teams from the 2015–16 season

== League table ==
Pos	Team	Pld	W	D	L	GF	GA	GD	Pts
1	Vllaznia (Note: Vllaznia qualified to the UEFA Champions League qualifying round.) (C)	18	18	0	0	134	2	+132	54
2	Kinostudio	18	12	2	4	93	30	+63	38
3	Apolonia	18	11	3	4	70	24	+46	36
4	Tirana AS	18	11	3	4	74	29	+45	36
5	The Door	18	10	3	5	44	33	+11	33
6	Skënderbeu	18	8	1	9	38	54	−16	25
7	Juban Danja	18	7	2	9	47	38	+9	23
8	Teuta	18	3	0	15	18	90	−72	9
9	AAS	18	3	0	15	18	112	−94	9
10	Dajti (Note: Dajti were deducted 3 points.)	18	0	0	18	5	129	−124	−3

Updated to match(es) played on 8 May 2016. Source:
(C) Champions
