= 2013–14 Kategoria Superiore Femra =

Kategoria Superiore Femra
- Season: 2013–14
- Matches: 90
- Goals: 512 (5.69 per match)
- Top goalscorer: Ambra Gjergji (43)

The 2013–14 Kategoria Superiore Femra was the 5th season of women's professional football, organized by the Albanian Football Federation.

Vllaznia were crowned champions, reaching the qualifying round of the 2014–15 UEFA Women's Champions League.

== League table ==
Pos	Team	Pld	W	D	L	GF	GA	GD	Pts
1	Vllaznia (Note: Vllaznia qualified to the UEFA Champions League qualifying round.) (C)	18	17	1	0	92	9	+83	52
2	Kinostudio	18	15	1	2	111	18	+93	46
3	Tirana AS	18	13	2	3	82	19	+63	41
4	Juban Danja	18	13	0	5	93	39	+54	39
5	The Door	18	9	1	8	50	43	+7	28
6	Shkëndija Durrës	18	7	2	9	44	48	−4	23
7	Dajti	18	5	2	11	18	91	−73	17
8	Apolonia	18	4	1	13	22	147	−125	13
9	Kamza (Note: Dardania and Kamza withdrew and have all matches (apart from those against each other) awarded 0-3 losses.)	18	0	2	16	0	48	−48	2
10	Dardania Sport	18	0	2	16	0	50	−50	2

Updated to match(es) played on 23 April 2014. Source:
(C) Champions
