= Esi Lufo =

Albanian footballer (born 2001)

Personal information
- Date of birth: 10 September 2001 (age 25)
- Place of birth: Tirana, Albania
- Height: 5 ft 9 in (1.75 m)
- Position: Forward

Team information
- Current team: TRU WolfPack
- Number: 10

College career
Years	Team	Apps	(Gls)
2023–	TRU WolfPack	55	(18)

Senior career*
Years	Team	Apps	(Gls)
2016–2018	Kinostudio	46	(52)
2019	Tirana AS	12	(15)
2019–2022	Vllaznia	63	(68)
2023	Rivers FC	11	(5)
2023–2024	Vllaznia	9	(1)

International career^{‡}
2017–2019	Albania U19	10	(1)
2019–	Albania	15	(1)
- * Club domestic league appearances and goals as of 27 April 2024 ‡ National team caps and goals as of 4 June 2024

Esi Lufo (born 10 September 2001) is an Albanian footballer who plays as a forward for the TRU WolfPack in the Canadian university system and the Albania women's national team.

== Early life ==
Lufo began playing football at the age of 5.

== University career ==
In 2020, she had been set to attend the University of Charleston and play for the women's soccer team, but ultimately did not play.

In 2023, she moved to Canada to attend Thompson Rivers University, where she will play for the women's soccer team. On September 16, 2023, she scored her first goal in a match against the Saskatchewan Huskies.

== Club career ==
Lufo began her senior career with Kinostudio in the Albanian Women's National Championship, where she played for three years. She made her professional debut at age 14.

Afterwards, she joined Tirana.

In 2019, she joined Vllaznia, the top club in the Albanian league.

In 2023, she joined Rivers FC in League1 British Columbia. She scored in her debut on April 30 against Altitude FC.

In November 2023, she returned to Vllaznia.

== Career statistics ==
=== Club ===
As of August 27, 2024

Appearances and goals by club, season and competition
Club	Season	League			National cup		Continental		Total	
Club	Season	Division	Apps	Goals	Apps	Goals	Apps	Goals	Apps	Goals
Kinostudio	2016–17	Kategoria Superiore Femra	18	21	2	2	—		20	23
Kinostudio	2017–18	Kategoria Superiore Femra	18	19	2	2	—		20	21
Kinostudio	2018–19	Kategoria Superiore Femra	10	12	0	0	—		10	12
Kinostudio	Total		46	52	4	4	0	0	50	56
Tirana	2018–19	Kategoria Superiore Femra	12	15	2	1	—		14	16
Vllaznia	2019–20	Kategoria Superiore Femra	18	22	3	2	5	0	26	24
Vllaznia	2020–21	Kategoria Superiore Femra	18	16	0	0	2	0	20	16
Vllaznia	2021–22	Kategoria Superiore Femra	19	24	0	0	3	0	22	24
Vllaznia	2022–23	Kategoria Superiore Femra	8	6	0	0	5	0	13	6
Vllaznia	Total		63	68	3	2	15	0	81	70
Rivers FC	2023	League1 British Columbia	11	5	—		—		11	5
Vllaznia	2023–24	Kategoria Superiore Femra	9	1	0	0	0	0	9	1
Total			141	141	9	7	15	0	165	148

=== International ===
As of match played 4 June 2024

Appearances and goals by national team and year
National team	Year	Apps	Goals
Albania	2019	2	0
Albania	2020	1	0
Albania	2021	6	1
Albania	2022	2	0
Albania	2023	2	0
Albania	2024	2	0
Total		15	1

== International career ==
She made her debut with the Albania U19 team in a friendly against Montenegro U19.

She scored her first senior international goal against Armenia in a 5-0 World Cup qualifying victory.
