= 2009 Kategoria Superiore Femra =

Kategoria Superiore Femra
- Season: 2009
- Matches: 7
- Goals: 38 (5.43 per match)

The 2009 Kategoria Superiore Femra was the 1st season of the highest division of women's football in Albania, organized by the Albanian Football Federation, played after several unofficial tournaments, which were staged as a promotion for women's football in Albania.

The five-day knockout tournament featured eight teams. Tirana AS won the title, beating Juban Danja 4–0 in the final.

== Results ==
=== Quarter-finals ===
All matches were played on 23 January 2009, with two played at Selman Stërmasi Stadium in Tirana and two at the National Sports Centre in Kamëz.

Team 1	Score	Team 2
Tirana AS	8–0	Tropojë
Juban Danja	7–0	Olimpik Tirana
Tirana	1–3	Rubiku
Memaliaj Sport	0–3	The Door

=== Semi-finals ===
Team 1	Score	Team 2
Tirana AS	7–0	The Door
Rubiku	0–5	Juban Danja

=== Final ===
28 January 2009

Tirana AS	4–0	Juban Danja
Zaimaj; Seranaj; Baro	Summary (in Albanian)
