= Megi Doçi =

Albanian footballer (born 1996)

Personal information
- Date of birth: 14 October 1996 (age 30)
- Place of birth: Burrel, Albania
- Height: 1.66 m (5 ft 5 in)
- Position: Forward

Team information
- Current team: Vllaznia
- Number: 11

Youth career
- 2008–2010: Dardania

Senior career*
Years	Team	Apps	(Gls)
2010–2011	Dardania	1+	(4)
2011–2012	Tirana AS	7	(22)
2012–2013	Ada Velipojë	19	(30)
2013–	Vllaznia	244	(789)
2024	→ Galatasaray (loan)	13	(3)

International career^{‡}
2014	Albania U19	6	(0)
2014–	Albania	74	(25)
- * Club domestic league appearances and goals as of 21 June 2026 ‡ National team caps and goals as of 21 June 2026

Megi Doçi (born 14 October 1996) is an Albanian footballer who plays as a forward for Kategoria Superiore club Vllaznia and captains the Albania national team.

== Club career ==
During the 2019–20, Doçi scored 88 league goals in just 18 games for Vllaznia, setting a new record in Albanian football.

Doçi signed a six-month contract with Galatasaray on 17 January 2024.

== International career ==
Doçi made her senior debut on 14 June 2014 in a 3-0 Women's World Cup qualifying loss to Portugal. She scored her first goal on 31 August 2015 in a 7-1 Friendly match loss to Croatia. Doçi has been capped for the Albania national team, appearing for the team during the 2019 FIFA Women's World Cup qualifying cycle. She has also been part of the Albania U19 squad.

== Career statistics ==
=== Club ===
Season Statistics - Update: 26 September 2026
Club	Season	League		Cup		Europe		Total	
Club	Season	Apps	Goals	Apps	Goals	Apps	Goals	Apps	Goals
Dardania	2010-11	1	4	0	0	0	0	1	4
Total		1	4	0	0	0	0	1	4
Tirana AS	2011-12	7	22	0	0	0	0	7	22
Total		7	22	0	0	0	0	7	22
Ada Velipojë	2011-12	7	15	2	2	0	0	9	17
Ada Velipojë	2012-13	12	15	3	2	3	0	18	17
Ada Velipojë	2013-14	0	0	0	0	3	1	3	1
Total		19	30	5	4	6	1	30	35
Vllaznia	2013-14	14	6	3	2	0	0	17	8
Vllaznia	2014-15	22	57	4	6	3	1	29	64
Vllaznia	2015-16	18	40	3	4	3	0	24	44
Vllaznia	2016-17	18	58	3	8	3	1	24	67
Vllaznia	2017-18	20	70	3	3	3	1	26	74
Vllaznia	2018-19	22	79	3	3	3	2	28	84
Vllaznia	2019-20	18	88	3	5	5	2	26	95
Vllaznia	2020-21	21	64	3	6	2	0	26	70
Vllaznia	2021-22	20	66	3	7	3	0	26	73
Vllaznia	2022-23	18	65	5	12	9	2	32	79
Vllaznia	2023-24	9	49	0	0	2	1	11	50
Vllaznia	2024-25	21	83	0	0	2	1	23	84
Vllaznia	2025-26	19	47	4	5	5	2 (Note: Two appearances and 1 goal in UEFA Women's Champions League, 3 appearance and 1 goal in Women's UEFA Europa Cup)	28	54
Vllaznia	2026-27	8	18	0	0	2	2	10	20
Total		247	789	37	61	46	15	330	863
Galatasaray S.K.	2023-24	13	3	0	0	0	0	13	3
Total		13	3	0	0	0	0	13	3
Total		289	849	42	65	50	16	380	930

=== International ===
As of match played 18 April 2026

Appearances and goals by national team and year
National team	Year	Apps	Goals
Albania	2014	1	0
Albania	2015	7	1
Albania	2016	2	0
Albania	2017	8	2
Albania	2018	4	1
Albania	2019	5	0
Albania	2020	4	2
Albania	2021	9	5
Albania	2022	4	1
Albania	2023	6	2
Albania	2024	8	2
Albania	2025	10	5
Albania	2026	6	4
Total		74	25

List of international goals scored by Megi Doçi
No.	Date	Venue	Opponent	Score	Result	Competition
1.	31 August 2015	Belišće Stadium, Belišće, Croatia	Croatia	1–4	1–7	Friendly
2.	11 April 2017	Elbasan Arena, Elbasan, Albania	Greece	1–1	2–1	2019 FIFA Women's World Cup qualification
3.	24 November 2017	Loro Boriçi Stadium, Shkodër, Albania	Poland	1–4	1–4	2019 FIFA Women's World Cup qualification
4.	4 September 2018	Loro Boriçi Stadium, Shkodër, Albania	Scotland	1–1	1–2	2019 FIFA Women's World Cup qualification
5.	11 March 2020	Ammochostos Stadium, Larnaca, Cyprus	Cyprus	1–0	2–0	UEFA Women's Euro 2022 qualifying
6.	27 November 2020	Loro Boriçi Stadium, Shkodër, Albania	Cyprus	2–0	4–0	UEFA Women's Euro 2022 qualifying
7.	15 July 2021	Selman Stërmasi Stadium, Tirana, Albania	Turkey	1–0	1–4	Friendly
8.	6 September 2021	Elbasan Arena, Elbasan, Albania	Kosovo	1–0	1–1	2023 FIFA Women's World Cup qualification
9.	21 October 2021	Arena Kombëtare, Tirana, Albania	Armenia	1–0	5–0	2023 FIFA Women's World Cup qualification
10.	21 October 2021	Arena Kombëtare, Tirana, Albania	Armenia	3–0	5–0	2023 FIFA Women's World Cup qualification
11.	30 November 2021	Fadil Vokrri Stadium, Pristina, Kosovo	Kosovo	2–0	3–1	2023 FIFA Women's World Cup qualification
12.	12 April 2022	Armavir City Stadium, Armavir, Armenia	Armenia	1–0	4–0	2023 FIFA Women's World Cup qualification
13.	7 April 2023	Elbasan Arena, Elbasan, Albania	North Macedonia	1–1	3–1	Friendly
14.	27 October 2023	Tallaght Stadium, Dublin, Ireland	Republic of Ireland	1–1	1–5	2023–24 UEFA Women's Nations League
15.	4 June 2024	Elbasan Arena, Elbasan, Albania	Luxembourg	1–0	3–1	UEFA Women's Euro 2025 qualifying
16.	3 December 2024	Eugen Popescu Stadium, Târgoviște, Romania	Romania	2–1	2–1	Friendly
17.	25 February 2025	Střelecký ostrov, České Budějovice, Czech Republic	Czech Republic	1–0	1–5	2025 UEFA Women's Nations League
18.	4 April 2025	Loro Boriçi Stadium, Shkodër, Albania	Croatia	3–0	4–0	2025 UEFA Women's Nations League
19.	24 October 2025	Antonis Papadopoulos Stadium, Larnaca, Cyprus	Cyprus	1–0	2–3	2025 UEFA Women's Nations League play-off matches
20.	24 October 2025	Antonis Papadopoulos Stadium, Larnaca, Cyprus	Cyprus	2–0	2–3	2025 UEFA Women's Nations League play-off matches
21.	28 October 2025	Arena Kombëtare, Tirana, Albania	Cyprus	3–0	3–0	2025 UEFA Women's Nations League play-off matches
22.	3 March 2026	Gradski stadion, Nikšić, Montenegro	Montenegro	1–1	2–1	2027 FIFA Women's World Cup qualification
23.	3 March 2026	Gradski stadion, Nikšić, Montenegro	Montenegro	2–1	2–1	2027 FIFA Women's World Cup qualification

== Honours ==
Ada Velipojë

- Kategoria Superiore Femra: 2011–12, 2012–13

KFF Vllaznia

- Kategoria Superiore Femra: 2013–14, 2014–15, 2015–16, 2016–17, 2017–18, 2018–19, 2019–20, 2020–21, 2021–22, 2022–23, 2024–25.
- Albanian Women's Cup: 2013–14, 2014–15, 2015–16, 2016–17, 2017–18, 2018–19, 2019–20, 2020–21, 2021–22, 2022–23.

Individual

- Kategoria Superiore Femra: Top Scorer: 2014–15, 2016–17, 2017–18, 2018–19, 2019–20, 2020–21, 2021–22, 2024–25.

== See also ==
- List of Albania women's international footballers
- List of women footballers with 300 or more goals
