= 2014–15 Kategoria Superiore Femra =

Kategoria Superiore Femra
- Season: 2014–15
- Matches: 132
- Goals: 789 (5.98 per match)
- Top goalscorer: Megi Doçi (57)

The 2014–15 Kategoria Superiore Femra was the 6th season of women's professional football, organized by the Albanian Football Federation. By winning the league, Vllaznia (its second consecutive title) qualified for the 2015–16 UEFA Women's Champions League.

== League table ==
Pos	Team	Pld	W	D	L	GF	GA	GD	Pts
1	Vllaznia (Note: Vllaznia qualified to the UEFA Champions League qualifying round. b. Juban - 3 points deleted.) (C)	22	22	0	0	169	10	+159	66
2	Kukësi	22	17	2	3	132	26	+106	53
3	Kinostudio	22	16	1	5	106	39	+67	49
4	The Door	22	15	1	6	66	35	+31	46
5	Juban Danja	22	15	3	4	112	24	+88	45
6	Tirana AS	22	11	1	10	56	46	+10	34
7	Apolonia	22	8	2	12	46	72	−26	26
8	Elbasani	22	6	3	13	31	63	−32	21
9	Shkëndija Durrës	22	6	2	14	33	73	−40	20
10	Bilisht Sport	22	4	5	13	23	96	−73	17
11	Dajti	22	2	0	20	8	111	−103	6
12	AAS	22	0	0	22	7	194	−187	0

Updated to match(es) played on 26 April 2015. Source:
(C) Champions
