= 2023–24 Kategoria Superiore Femra =

Kategoria Superiore Femra
- Season: 2023–24
- Dates: 1 October 2023 – 12 May 2024
- Champions: Vllaznia
- Champions League: Vllaznia
- Matches: 96
- Goals: 747 (7.78 per match)
- Top goalscorer: Valentina Troka (70 Goals)
- Biggest home win: Partizani 24–0 Skënderbeu (9 March 2024)
- Biggest away win: Skënderbeu 0–23 Tirana (18 November 2023)
- Highest scoring: Partizani 24–0 Skënderbeu (9 March 2024)
- Longest winning run: 11 matches Tirana
- Longest unbeaten run: 14 matches Vllaznia
- Longest winless run: 15 matches Teuta
- Longest losing run: 15 matches Teuta

The 2023–24 Kategoria Superiore Femra was the 15th season of women's professional football, organized by the Albanian Football Federation.

Locations of teams from the 2023–24 season

== League table ==
Pos	Team	Pld	W	D	L	GF	GA	GD	Pts
1	Vllaznia (C)	18	16	1	1	135	4	+131	49
2	Apolonia	18	15	1	2	159	7	+152	46
3	Tirana (Note: Tirana was deducted 3 points after failing to secure safety precautions and organisative measures in a match against Vllaznia.)	18	15	0	3	118	16	+102	42
4	Partizani	18	13	0	5	141	15	+126	39
5	Kinostudio	18	9	1	8	62	49	+13	28
6	Laçi	18	6	3	9	47	77	−30	21
7	Gramshi	18	6	2	10	32	83	−51	20
8	Skënderbeu	18	3	0	15	11	164	−153	9
9	Lushnja	18	2	0	16	7	137	−130	6
10	Teuta	18	1	0	17	14	174	−160	3

Updated to match(es) played on 28 April 2024. Source:
(C) Champions

== Results ==
Home \ Away	APF	GRM	KIN	LAÇ	LUS	PAR	SKË	TEU	TIR	VLL
Apolonia	—	7–0	6–1	10–0	13–0	2–1	14–0	23–0	3–0	0–0
Gramshi	0–14	—	0–2	1–1	2–0	1–9	3–2	9–0	1–3	0–6
FC Kinostudio	0–5	1–0	—	8–0	4–0	0–5	8–0	11–0	0–4	0–4
Laçi	0–9	2–2	2–2	—	5–0	0–10	7–0	5–0	2–6	0–7
Lushnja	1–17	0–6	0–7	0–8	—	0–4	1–0	2–1	0–13	0–10
Partizani	0–2	14–0	7–0	5–0	17–0	—	24–0	12–0	2–3	0–3
Skënderbeu	0–16	0–3	0–10	0–3	2–1	0–13	—	4–2	0–23	0–11
Teuta	0–17	2–4	1–8	1–12	4–2	0–15	2–3	—	0–13	0–8
Tirana	2–0	8–0	6–0	6–0	12–0	1–3	10–0	5–1	—	3–0
Vllaznia	2–1	12–0	9–0	10–0	12–0	3–0	13–0	21–0	4–0	—

Updated to match(es) played on 28 April 2024. Source:
Legend: Blue = home team win; Yellow = draw; Red = away team win.
For upcoming matches, an "a" indicates there is an article about the rivalry between the two participants.

== Final four round ==
The teams that qualified to the Final four round will be split into two pots, between the top two teams and the third and fourth ranked teams where they will be drawn in two semi-finals. The semi-finals will consist of two legs. If the aggregate score will be tied after both legs, the team with the higher league ranking will qualify to the final. The final will be played in a neutral venue and if the score is tied after 90 minutes there will be extra time and penalties if required. The same rules will be applied for the third place-play off. The winner of final will be crowned as the league's champions and also gain qualification to the Round 1 of the 2024–25 UEFA Women's Champions League.

=== Bracket ===
Semi-finals
Partizani	0	0	0
Vllaznia	3	7	10
Tirana	1	0	1
Apolonia	1	2	3

Final
Vllaznia	4
Apolonia	0
Third place play-off
Partizani	2
Tirana	1

== Semi-finals ==
3 May 2024
12:00

Partizani	0−3	Vllaznia
		Borçi 10'; Ramadani 75'; Lufo 79'

Arena e Demave, Tirana
Referee: Eglantina Pjetrushaj
7 May 2024
12:00

Vllaznia	7−0	Partizani
Berisha 14'; Borçi 32'; Ramadani 48', 62', 80'; Shala 66'; Lufo 79'

Reshit Rusi Stadium, Shkodër
Referee: Disela Lekgegaj

3 May 2024
16:00

Tirana	1−1	Apolonia
Musaj 12'		Troka 48'

Skënder Halili Complex, Tirana
Referee: Mirela Çemeri
7 May 2024
16:00

Apolonia	2−0	Tirana
Levenaj 65'; Troka 71'

Loni Papuçiu Stadium, Fier
Referee: Emanuela Rusta

== Third place play-off ==
11 May 2024
13:00

Partizani	2−1	Tirana
E. Gashi 75'; L. Gashi 90'		Berisha 78'

Shtëpia e Futbollit, Tirana
Referee: Eglantina Pjetrushaj

== Final ==
12 May 2024
17:30

Vllaznia	4−0	Apolonia
Franja 21' (pen.), 51'; Berisha 24'; Ramadani 27'

Shtëpia e Futbollit, Tirana
Referee: Emanuela Rusta
