= 2010–11 Kategoria Superiore Femra =

Kategoria Superiore Femra
- Season: 2010–11
- Matches: 72
- Goals: 314 (4.36 per match)

The 2010–11 Kategoria Superiore Femra was the 2nd season of the top-tier women's professional football competition in Albania, organized by the Albanian Football Federation.

Ada Velipojë were crowned champions, reaching the qualifying round of the 2011–12 UEFA Women's Champions League.

== League table ==
| Pos | Team | Pld | W | D | L | GF | GA | GD | Pts |
|---|---|---|---|---|---|---|---|---|---|
| 1 | Ada (Note: Ada qualified to the UEFA Champions League qualifying round.) (C) | 16 | 12 | 4 | 0 | 64 | 15 | +49 | 40 |
| 2 | Tirana AS | 16 | 11 | 2 | 3 | 70 | 15 | +55 | 35 |
| 3 | Kinostudio | 16 | 11 | 1 | 4 | 51 | 21 | +30 | 34 |
| 4 | Juban Danja | 16 | 9 | 5 | 2 | 38 | 19 | +19 | 32 |
| 5 | Memaliaj Sport | 16 | 7 | 2 | 7 | 22 | 29 | −7 | 23 |
| 6 | Shkëndija Durrës | 16 | 5 | 1 | 10 | 20 | 38 | −18 | 16 |
| 7 | The Door | 16 | 4 | 1 | 11 | 23 | 61 | −38 | 13 |
| 8 | Dardania Sport | 16 | 4 | 0 | 12 | 16 | 51 | −35 | 12 |
| 9 | Albiks | 16 | 1 | 0 | 15 | 10 | 65 | −55 | 3 |

(C) Champions
