= 2011–12 Kategoria Superiore Femra =

Kategoria Superiore Femra
- Season: 2011–12
- Matches: 56
- Goals: 318 (5.68 per match)
- Top goalscorer: Advije Veliu (41)

The 2011–12 Kategoria Superiore Femra was the 3rd season of women's professional football, organized by the Albanian Football Federation.

Ada Velipojë were crowned champions, reaching the qualifying round of the 2012–13 UEFA Women's Champions League.

== League table ==
Pos	Team	Pld	W	D	L	GF	GA	GD	Pts
1	Ada (Note: Ada Velipojë qualified to the UEFA Champions League qualifying round.) (C)	14	13	1	0	75	10	+65	40
2	Juban Danja	14	10	2	2	69	13	+56	32
3	Tirana AS	14	10	2	2	66	12	+54	32
4	Kinostudio	14	6	1	7	31	27	+4	19
5	The Door	14	4	4	6	38	45	−7	16
6	Shkëndija Durrës	14	4	2	8	22	51	−29	14
7	Kamza	14	3	0	11	11	60	−49	9
8	Dardania Sport	14	0	0	14	6	100	−94	0

Updated to match(es) played on 14 April 2012. Source:
(C) Champions
