= 2012–13 Kategoria Superiore Femra =

Kategoria Superiore Femra
- Season: 2012–13
- Matches: 56
- Goals: 293 (5.23 per match)
- Top goalscorer: Ambra Gjergji (23)

The 2012–13 Kategoria Superiore Femra was the 4th season of women's professional football, organized by the Albanian Football Federation.

Ada Velipojë were crowned champions, reaching the qualifying round of the 2013–14 UEFA Women's Champions League.

== League table ==
Pos	Team	Pld	W	D	L	GF	GA	GD	Pts
1	Ada (Note: Ada qualified to the UEFA Champions League qualifying round.) (C)	14	12	2	0	67	7	+60	38
2	Juban Danja	14	10	3	1	69	8	+61	33
3	Kinostudio	14	10	1	3	57	19	+38	31
4	Tirana AS	14	4	3	7	33	24	+9	15
5	The Door	14	4	2	8	29	40	−11	14
6	Shkëndija Durrës	14	4	1	9	17	76	−59	13
7	Dardania Sport	14	3	0	11	10	84	−74	9
8	Kamza	14	2	2	10	11	35	−24	8

Updated to match(es) played on 20 April 2013. Source:
(C) Champions
