= Albania women's national under-19 football team =

National association football team

Albania Women's U-19
- Nickname(s): Vashat Kuq e Zinjtë (Red and Blacks)
- Association: Federata Shqiptare e Futbollit
- Confederation: UEFA (Europe)
- Head coach: Nevil Dede
- Home stadium: Elbasan Arena, Loni Papuçiu Stadium
- FIFA code: ALB
First colours	Second colours	Third colours

The Albania women's national under-19 football team represents Albania in international women's football and is governed by Albanian Football Association.

== 2016 UEFA Women's Under-19 Championship Qualification ==
=== Group 11 ===
Pos	Team	Pld	W	D	L	GF	GA	GD	Pts	Qualification
1	Scotland	3	3	0	0	9	5	+4	9	Elite round
2	Austria (H)	3	2	0	1	10	3	+7	6	Elite round
3	Ukraine	3	1	0	2	5	5	0	3	
4	Albania	3	0	0	3	4	15	−11	0	

Source: UEFA
Rules for classification: Qualification tiebreakers
(H) Hosts
15 September 2015
18:00

Austria	8–1	Albania
Lackner 5', 14', 90'; Dunst 41', 68'; Naschenweng 56'; Wasserbauer 59', 65'	Report	Gjegji 85'

Sportarena Bad Erlach, Bad Erlach
Referee: Tess Petersson (Sweden)

17 September 2015
11:00

Scotland	4–2	Albania
Tweedie 9'; Howat 20'; Hanson 41'; Boyce 74'	Report	Franja 25'; Gjegji 45+3'

Sportschule Lindabrunn, Enzesfeld-Lindabrunn
Referee: Viola Raudziņa (Latvia)
20 September 2015
17:00

Albania	1–3	Ukraine
Behluli 90+1'	Report	Budaieva 43'; Polyukhovych 45+1'; Kadolli 67' (o.g.)

Stadt Sportanlage, Sankt Pölten
Referee: Tess Petersson (Sweden)

== 2017 UEFA Women's Under-19 Championship Qualification ==
=== Group 4 ===
Pos	Team	Pld	W	D	L	GF	GA	GD	Pts	Qualification
1	Serbia	3	3	0	0	15	0	+15	9	Elite round
2	Scotland	3	2	0	1	19	3	+16	6	Elite round
3	Albania (H)	3	1	0	2	2	20	−18	3	
4	Cyprus	3	0	0	3	0	13	−13	0	

Source: UEFA
Rules for classification: Qualification tiebreakers
(H) Hosts
14 September 2016
14:00

Scotland	11–0	Albania
Cuthbert 3', 15', 30', 48', 63'; Hanson 32', 38'; Adams 34'; Kerr 67'; Cornet 87'; Boyce 90'	Report

Selman Stërmasi Stadium, Tirana
Referee: Valentina Garoffolo (Italy)
16 September 2016
14:00

Serbia	9–0	Albania
Mišeljić 25' (pen.); Savanović 28'; Filipović 71', 86', 87'; Ivanović 80', 88', 90+5'; Kovačević 84'	Report

Selman Stërmasi Stadium, Tirana
Referee: Cathrine Eide (Norway)
19 September 2016
14:00

Albania	2–0	Cyprus
Koldashi 21', 34'	Report

Selman Stërmasi Stadium, Tirana
Referee: Valentina Garoffolo (Italy)

== Squad ==
=== Current squad ===
The following players have been called up to participate in an international friendly on March 1, 2017 versus Montenegro. Caps and goals as of 3d March 2017

No.	Pos.	Player	Date of birth (age)	Caps	Goals	Club
	GK	Fabiola Mullai	6 March 1999 (age 27)	0	0	(Albanian Football Federation) Apolonia Fier
	DF	Sabina Kasa	13 January 1999 (age 27)	2	0	(Albanian Football Federation) Skënderbeu Korçë
	DF	Xhulia Xhindole	24 January 1999 (age 27)	0	0	(Albanian Football Federation) Apolonia Fier
	DF	Altea Aliaj	9 December 1999 (age 26)	0	0	(Albanian Football Federation) FC Kinostudio
	DF	Silvana Jova	16 February 1999 (age 27)	0	0	(Albanian Football Federation) FC Kinostudio
	DF	Bjorna Doko	24 March 2000 (age 26)	0	0	(Albanian Football Federation) Apolonia Fier
	MF	Uendi Muja	4 June 1999 (age 27)	2	0	(Albanian Football Federation) Vllaznia Shkodër
	MF	Vanesa Levanaj	10 August 2001 (age 25)	0	0	(Albanian Football Federation) Apolonia Fier
	MF	Maria Nicku		0	0	(Albanian Football Federation) KF Ada Velipojë
	MF	Esmeralda Noka		0	0	(United States Soccer Federation) New York
	MF	Edlira Cerkini		0	0	(Albanian Football Federation) Apolonia Fier
	MF	Paulina Zizolli		0	0	(Albanian Football Federation) KF Skënderbeu Korçë
	MF	Deborah Digli		0	0	(Italian Football Federation) Bologna
	MF	Riselda Leba		0	0	(Albanian Football Federation) Tirana AS
	MF	Rafaela Zere	26 April 1999 (age 27)	4	0	(Albanian Football Federation) Juban Danja
	MF	Elsi Lufo		0	0	(Albanian Football Federation) FC Kinostudio
	MF	Alketa Rragami	4 February 1998 (age 28)	0	0	(United States Soccer Federation) Rosedale College
	FW	Ilarja Zarka	1 October 2001 (age 25)	0	0	(Albanian Football Federation) Apolonia Fier
	FW	Sara Begallo	1 March 2000 (age 26)	0	0	(Albanian Football Federation) FC Kinostudio
	FW	Klarita Myrtollari	1 October 1999 (age 27)	2	1	(Albanian Football Federation) Skënderbeu Korçë

=== Recent Call-Ups ===
The following players have been called up within the last 12 months.

Pos.	Player	Date of birth (age)	Caps	Goals	Club	Latest call-up
GK	Diellza Musa	29 November 1997 (age 28)	2	0	(Albania) Vllaznia Shkodër	2016 UEFA Women's U19 qualifiers
DF	Majlinda Kadolli	7 April 1997 (age 29)	3	0	(Kosovo) KFF 13 Qershori	2016 UEFA Women's U19 qualifiers
FW	Kesjana Goro	31 March 1998 (age 28)	0	0	(Albania) Apolonia Fier	
MF	Blerta Shala		0	0	(Switzerland) Zurich	
MF	Anisa Kotorja		0	0	(Albania) Tirana AS	
MF	Ariana Hasani		0	0		
DF	Valbone Lipa	10 February 1997 (age 29)	3	0	(Albania) Vllaznia Shkodër	2016 UEFA Women's U19 qualifiers
DF	Ezmiralda Franja	4 February 1997 (age 29)	2	1	(Albania) Vllaznia Shkodër	2016 UEFA Women's U19 qualifiers
DF	Mirsada Skutina	27 May 1997 (age 29)	0	0	The Door Albania	2016 UEFA Women's U19 qualifiers
MF	Greis Domi	30 October 1998 (age 28)	6	0	(Italy) ACF Firenze	2016 UEFA Women's U19 qualifiers
MF	Endrina Elezaj	2 January 1997 (age 29)	3	0	(Albania) Vllaznia Shkodër	2016 UEFA Women's U19 qualifiers
MF	Egzona Zeka	25 April 1997 (age 29)	3	0	(Switzerland) FF Lugano 1976	2016 UEFA Women's U19 qualifiers
MF	Elmedina Shega	30 November 1997 (age 28)	3	0	The Door Albania	2016 UEFA Women's U19 qualifiers
DF	Klarina Goro	31 March 1998 (age 28)	0	0	(Albania) Apolonia Fier	
MF	Aidena Mustafaj	18 February 1998 (age 28)	0	0	(Albania) Juban Danja	
MF	Antigona Behluli	15 August 1998 (age 28)	3	1	(Albania) FC Kinostudio	
MF	Desantila Koldashi	8 August 1998 (age 28)	3	0	(Albania) Tirana AS	
DF	Gresa Haziri	10 April 1999 (age 27)	0	0	(Kosovo) KFF Mitrovica	
DF	Anxhela Aliu	29 January 1998 (age 28)	3	0	(Albania) Tirana AS	
GK	Ardiola Raxhimi	12 September 1998 (age 28)	6	0	(Albania) Vllaznia Shkodër	
FW	Ambra Gjegji	15 March 1997 (age 29)	8	2	(Albania) Vllaznia Shkodër	2016 UEFA Women's U19 qualifiers
FW	Valbona Popa	6 October 1997 (age 29)	3	0	(Albania) Skënderbeu Korçë	2016 UEFA Women's U19 qualifiers
