= Albanian Women's Cup =

Kupa e femrave
- Founded: 2009
- Region: Albania
- Current champions: Teuta - (1st title)
- Most championships: Vllaznia - (10 titles)
- Broadcaster: SuperSport
- Website: Women Cup
- 2025

The Albanian Women's Cup is the annual cup competition of women's football in Albania. Established in 2009, it is the second most important tournament after the National Championship. Vllaznia have won the Cup 10 times, with four other teams winning the trophy.

== List of finals ==
The list of finals so far:

Season	Champion	Result	Runner-up
2009–10	Tirana AS	6–0	The Door
2010–11	Ada	2–0	Juban Danja
2011–12	Juban Danja	4–1	FC Kinostudio
2012–13	Juban Danja	3–2	Ada
2013–14	Vllaznia	7–1	Juban Danja
2014–15	Vllaznia	4–0	Kukësi
2015–16	Vllaznia	6–0	FC Kinostudio
2016–17	Vllaznia	3–0	Apolonia
2017–18	Vllaznia	6–1	Tirana AS
2018–19	Vllaznia	3–0	Apolonia
2019–20	Vllaznia	4–0	Apolonia
2020–21	Vllaznia	Awd.	Apolonia
2021–22	Vllaznia	7–0	Tirana
2022–23	Vllaznia	4–1	Apolonia
2023–24	Apolonia	2–1	Partizani
2024–25	Apolonia	5–1	Egnatia
2025–26	Apolonia	0-1	Teuta

The 2014–15 final was actually played as a three-team round-robin stage. Both Vllaznia and Kukesi won their first match against Kinostudio, making their direct encounter the deciding final match.

The club Ada disbanded after the 2012/13 season. The whole team and personnel joined Vllaznia where they established a new women's team.

== By titles ==
Team	Home city	Titles
Vllaznia	Shkodër	10
Apolonia	Fier	2
Juban Danja	Shkodër	2
Ada	Velipojë	1
Tirana AS	Tirana	1
Teuta	Durrës	1

== See also ==
- Albanian Cup (men's)
