= Fitore Govori =

Kosovan footballer

Personal information
- Date of birth: 3 August 1987 (age 39)
- Place of birth: Pristina, SFR Yugoslavia (now Kosovo)
- Position: Defender

Senior career*
| Years | Team | Apps | (Gls) |
- Shkiponjat
- Ada
- Vllaznia

International career^{‡}
| 2013–2016 | Albania | 13 | (0) |
| 2017 | Kosovo | 2 | (0) |
- * Club domestic league appearances and goals ‡ National team caps and goals as of 3 March 2017

Fitore Govori (born 3 August 1987) is a Kosovan footballer who plays as a defender. She was a member of the Albania women's national team from 2013 to 2016, before Kosovo was accepted as a member of UEFA and FIFA. After that, she has played for Kosovo.

== See also ==
- List of Kosovo women's international footballers
- List of Albania women's international footballers
