= Altin Rraklli =

Albanian footballer and coach

Personal information
- Date of birth: 17 July 1970 (age 56)
- Place of birth: Kavajë, Albania
- Height: 1.75 m (5 ft 9 in)
- Position: Forward

Youth career
- 1987–1990: Besa Kavajë

Senior career*
Years	Team	Apps	(Gls)
1990–1992	Besa	68	(43)
1992–1996	SC Freiburg	86	(22)
1996–1997	Hertha BSC	28	(5)
1997–2002	SpVgg Unterhaching	147	(29)
2002–2003	Diyarbakırspor	12	(2)
2003–2004	Jahn Regensburg	21	(2)
2004–2005	Tirana	35	(19)
2005–2006	Besa	14	(4)
2009	SpVgg Bayern Hof	2	(0)
Total		413	(126)

International career
1992–2005	Albania	63	(11)

Managerial career
- 2009–2011: Tirana AS
- 2011–2016: Albania (women)
- * Club domestic league appearances and goals

Altin Rraklli (born 17 July 1970) is an Albanian football coach and former player who played as a forward.

Most of his professional career was spent in Germany, where he played for five clubs in both major levels of football, mainly SC Freiburg and SpVgg Unterhaching for a total of 282 games. He was the first ever player from the nation to compete in the Bundesliga.

== Club career ==
Born in Kavajë, Rraklli began his career with Besa Kavajë, moving to the professionals three years later. In 1992 he signed a two-year contract worth 15,000 Deutsche Mark with Germany's SC Freiburg, being instrumental in the Black Forest club's first ever top flight promotion by scoring 16 second division goals (squad best, tenth in the league, as Freiburg scored 102); in the next three Bundesliga seasons, he would only manage to be relatively used.

In the following eight years, Rraklli continued to work in Germany, mainly in the second level: Hertha BSC, SpVgg Unterhaching – achieving another promotion and living his best professional years – and SSV Jahn Regensburg, also having one-season spells in Turkey and his homeland and retiring professionally in 2006 with German top flight totals of 111 matches and 16 goals.

Rraklli returned in Albania in the summer of 2004, joining Tirana. He scored 19 league goals in his first season back in Albania, more than any other Tirana player, helping the team to win the championship. One of the highlights of the season was a hat-trick he scored against Teuta Durrës on 6 May 2005. On 21 August 2005, he played in the 2005 Albanian Supercup against Teuta Durrës which ended in a 5–4 penalty shootout win; Rraklli scored his team's last attempt.

Rraklli retired for good in 2009 at 39 years of age, after a brief spell with German amateurs SpVgg Bayern Hof.

== International career ==
Rraklli was a member of Albania national team from 1992 to 2005, amassing 63 appearances and scoring 11 goals. His debut was a memorable one, as he scored the only goal of a friendly match against Greece on 29 January 1992, to give Albania only their second ever win versus Ethniki. Shortly after, Rraklli was a member of the squad in the qualifying campaign of 1994 FIFA World Cup, making his competitive debut, in his second ever appearance, in a 2–0 defeat to Republic of Ireland in Dublin on 26 May. He went on to play six matches in the remaining part of the qualifiers, scoring only once, a late consolation goal in the home loss to Northern Ireland, which was his first competitive goal as well. It was a campaign to forget for Albania as they finished Group 3 in the last position, collecting only four points in 12 matches.

Rraklli partnered Sokol Kushta in the UEFA Euro 1996 qualifying campaign, where Albania was placed in Group 7. He missed only one game, the opening against Wales in September 1994, but played the remaining nine, wearing the number 10 shirt, and scored two times. Rraklli is especially remembered among Albanian fans for his stupendous goal against Germany, a right-footed volley from the a tight angle that went in the left triangle of Andreas Köpke's goal. Even tho Albania lost the match 2–1 at Fritz-Walter-Stadion, the goal received notoriety in both Albania and Germany. It was yet another poor campaign by Albania, who achieved the last place jointly with Wales, who had better goal difference.

At 32 years old, Rraklli was snubbed by newly appointed manager Giuseppe Dossena for the opening UEFA Euro 2004 qualifying matches against Switzerland and Russia in October 2002. He, however, returned in March 2003 after being called up by team manager Hans-Peter Briegel, making his first qualifying appearance against Russia at Loro Boriçi Stadium, netting the opener inside 20 minutes in a subsequent 3–1 win; he became only the second ever Albania player to reach double-figures with the national team, the first being Sokol Kushta, who achieved the feat in 1995. It was also the official debut of manager Hans-Peter Briegel. At the time he also become all-time top goalscorer of Albania, with 10 goals.

Rraklli's final appearance took part on 30 March 2005 coincidentally against Greece, valid for the 2006 FIFA World Cup qualification. Unlike his debut, Rraklli didn't score, and entered as a second-half substitute, unable to prevent the 2–0 away loss. It was his 63rd appearance, which at that time placed him in second in the all-time appearance maker list, only behind goalkeeper Foto Strakosha (73). He played only two matches during the qualifying stage, both of them as substitute, as Albania concluded Group 2 in fifth position with 13 points, leaving behind Georgia and Kazakhstan.

== Managerial career ==
Rraklli started working as a manager immediately after retiring, creating Tirana AS and going on to win the inaugural Albanian women's championship. In 2011, he was appointed at the helm of the women's national team since 2011.

In April 2016, Rraklli left his position due to family reasons. In December 2015, Rraklli was at the center of a controversy, as several players refused call-ups due to sexual harassment by the coach. The local media also released several messages of Rraklli asking for sexual favours to several girls in reward of being part of the team. Some of the players were Ambra Gjegji, Lucie Gjini, Ezmiralda Franja and Megi Doçi, who were not allowed to go to the national team by their family after the scandal became public.

== Personal life ==
In November 2016, Rraklli was accused in match fixing in Austria. He was sentenced to ten months in prison, a sentence currently suspended.

In July 2017, the Prosecution of Tirana requested seven years imprisonment for Rraklli after being accused for fraud. Rraklli was accused of fraud for €150,000 towards an Albanian citizen, whose name is unknown, but it was alleged that it was his relative. The sentence was reduced to five years by the court, and later to three years and four months, due to Rraklli asking for shortened trial. Later, his sentence was converted into two years of test service.

== Career statistics ==
=== Club ===
Appearances and goals by club, season and competition
Club	Season	League			Cup		Europe		Other		Total	
Club	Season	Division	Apps	Goals	Apps	Goals	Apps	Goals	Apps	Goals	Apps	Goals
Besa Kavajë	1990–91	Albanian Superliga	38	27	0	0	—		—		38	27
Besa Kavajë	1991–92	Albanian Superliga	30	16	0	0	—		—		30	16
Besa Kavajë	Total		68	48	0	0	—		—		68	48
SC Freiburg	1992–93	2. Bundesliga	37	16	1	1	—		—		38	17
SC Freiburg	1993–94	Bundesliga	21	6	3	2	—		—		24	8
SC Freiburg	1994–95	Bundesliga	17	0	1	0	—		—		18	0
SC Freiburg	1995–96	Bundesliga	11	0	2	0	2 (Note: Appearance(s) in UEFA Cup)	0	—		15	0
SC Freiburg	Total		86	22	7	3	2	0	—		95	25
Hertha BSC	1995–96	2. Bundesliga	14	3	0	0	—		—		14	3
Hertha BSC	1996–97	2. Bundesliga	14	2	1	0	—		—		15	2
Hertha BSC	Total		28	5	1	0	—		—		29	5
SpVgg Unterhaching	1997–98	2. Bundesliga	27	9	0	0	—		—		27	9
SpVgg Unterhaching	1998–99	2. Bundesliga	33	9	2	1	—		—		35	10
SpVgg Unterhaching	1999–2000	Bundesliga	32	6	1	0	—		—		33	6
SpVgg Unterhaching	2000–01	Bundesliga	30	4	2	1	—		—		32	5
SpVgg Unterhaching	2001–02	2. Bundesliga	25	1	2	0	—		—		27	1
SpVgg Unterhaching	Total		147	29	7	2	—		—		154	31
Diyarbakırspor	2002–03	Süper Lig	12	2	0	0	—		—		12	2
Jahn Regensburg	2003–04	2. Bundesliga	21	2	2	2	—		—		23	4
Tirana	2004–05	Albanian Superliga	29	19	9	4	0	0	—		38	23
Tirana	2005–06	Albanian Superliga	6	0	4	1	4 (Note: Appearance(s) in UEFA Champions League)	1	1 (Note: Appearance in Albanian Supercup)	0	15	2
Tirana	Total		35	19	13	5	4	1	1	0	53	25
Besa Kavajë	2005–06	Albanian Superliga	14	4	0	0	—		—		14	4
SpVgg Bayern Hof	2009–10	Bayernliga	2	0	0	0	—		—		2	0
Career total			408	126	30	12	6	1	1	0	445	139

=== International ===
Appearances and goals by national team and year
National team	Year	Apps	Goals
Albania	1992	5	1
Albania	1993	3	1
Albania	1994	4	2
Albania	1995	6	1
Albania	1996	4	0
Albania	1997	4	0
Albania	1998	8	2
Albania	1999	6	1
Albania	2000	3	0
Albania	2001	4	1
Albania	2002	4	0
Albania	2003	8	1
Albania	2004	3	1
Albania	2005	1	0
Total		63	11

Scores and results list Albania's goal tally first, score column indicates score after each Rraklli goal.

List of international goals scored by Altin Rraklli
No.	Date	Venue	Cap	Opponent	Score	Result	Competition
1	29 January 1992	Qemal Stafa Stadium, Tirana, Albania	1	Greece		1–1	Friendly
2	17 February 1993	Qemal Stafa Stadium, Tirana, Albania	6	Northern Ireland		1–2	1994 FIFA World Cup qualification
3	14 May 1994	Gradski stadion, Tetovo, Macedonia	9	Macedonia		1–5	Friendly
4	18 December 1994	Fritz-Walter-Stadion, Kaiserslautern, Germany	12	Germany		1–2	UEFA Euro 1996 qualifying
5	6 September 1995	Qemal Stafa Stadium, Tirana, Albania	16	Bulgaria		1–1	UEFA Euro 1996 qualifying
6	21 January 1998	Atatürk Olympic Stadium, Antalya, Turkey	27	Turkey		4–1	Friendly
7	21 January 1998	Atatürk Olympic Stadium, Antalya, Turkey	27	Turkey		4–1	Friendly
8	9 October 1999	Qemal Stafa Stadium, Tirana, Albania	40	Georgia		2–1	UEFA Euro 2000 qualifying
9	28 March 2001	Qemal Stafa Stadium, Tirana, Albania	45	England		1–3	2002 FIFA World Cup qualification
10	29 March 2003	Loro Boriçi Stadium, Shkodër, Albania	52	Russia		3–1	UEFA Euro 2004 qualifying
11	18 August 2004	Tsirio Stadium, Limassol, Cyprus	61	Cyprus		1–2	Friendly

== Honours ==
Tirana

- Albanian Superliga: 2004–05
- Albanian Supercup: 2005
