= Klaudia Rrotani =

Albanian footballer

Personal information
- Date of birth: 16 May 1995 (age 31)
- Place of birth: Shkodër, Albania
- Position: Forward

Senior career*
Years	Team	Apps	(Gls)
- Ada

International career^{‡}
2013	Albania U19	3	(0)
2014–	Albania	2	(0)
- * Club domestic league appearances and goals ‡ National team caps and goals as of 8 November 2019

Klaudia Rrotani (born 16 May 1995) is an Albanian footballer who plays as a forward for the Albania women's national team. She has also appeared for the Albania U19 squad.

== See also ==
- List of Albania women's international footballers
