= Kategoria Superiore Femra =

- Founded: 2009
- Country: Albania
- Confederation: UEFA
- Number of clubs: 9
- Level on pyramid: 1
- Domestic cup: Albanian Women's Cup
- International cup: Champions League
- Current champions: Vllaznia (13th title) (2025–26)
- Most championships: Vllaznia (13 titles)
- Top scorer: Megi Doçi (801+ goals)
- Website: Official website
- Current: 2026–27

Kategoria Superiore Femra, known officially as Abissnet Superiore Femra, is the highest division of women's football in Albania. The league is the female equivalent to the men's Kategoria Superiore. The current season is contested by 9 clubs.

== History ==
Although football is considered the most popular sport in Albania, women's football had historically been non-evident in the country until 2007, when the first ever national tournament was held in Sarandë, from 15 to 18 August, as a promotional event for women's football. The teams who participated were amateur sides made up of a selection of players from Tirana, Shkodër, Korçë and Rubik. Six more friendly tournaments were held in the following two years, in order to raise the profile of the sport and to receive the backing of the Albanian Football Federation.

The first official competition was held in the form of a knockout tournament, played between 23–28 January 2009 at Selman Stërmasi Stadium in Tirana and at the FSHF Sports Center in Kamëz. The tournament featured eight teams: Tirana AS, Tropojë, Juban Danja, Olimpik Tirana, Tirana, Rubiku, Memaliaj Sport and The Door. The quarter-finals were held on 23 January and the semi-finals on 25 January, with the final being held three days later, on 28 January, at Selman Stërmasi Stadium. The final saw Tirana AS, led by coach Altin Rraklli face off against Juban Danja. Tirana AS emerged victorious with a commanding 4–0 win, with goals from Aurora Seranaj, Ana Baro and a brace by Brisida Zaimaj, securing their place as the first-ever champions of Albania.

== Clubs (2024–25) ==
Locations of the 2022–23 Albanian Women's National Championship teams

#	Club	Location
1	Apolonia	Fier
2	Atletik Klub	Shkodër
3	Egnatia	Rrogozhinë
4	Gramshi	Gramsh
5	Kinostudio	Tirana
6	Lushnja	Lushnjë
7	Partizani	Tirana
8	Teuta	Durrës
9	Vllaznia	Shkodër

== Champions and top goalscorers ==
Season	Winner	Runner-up	Top Scorer(s)	Goals
2009	Tirana AS	Juban Danja	Emanuela Jaku	8
2010–11	Ada	Tirana AS	Ana Baro	24
2011–12	Ada	Tirana AS	Advije Veliu	41
2012–13	Ada	Juban Danja	Ambra Gjergji	23
2013–14	Vllaznia *	FC Kinostudio	Ambra Gjergji	43
2014–15	Vllaznia	Kukësi	Megi Doçi	57
2015–16	Vllaznia	Tirana AS	Mesuara Begallo	51
2016–17	Vllaznia	Apolonia	Megi Doçi	62
2017–18	Vllaznia	Tirana AS	Megi Doçi	70
2018–19	Vllaznia	Tirana AS	Megi Doçi	79
2019–20	Vllaznia	Apolonia	Megi Doçi	88
2020–21	Vllaznia	Apolonia	Megi Doçi	59
2021–22	Vllaznia	Apolonia	Megi Doçi	66
2022–23	Vllaznia	Tirana	Megi Doçi	66
2023–24	Vllaznia	Apolonia	Valentina Troka	65
2024–25	Vllaznia	Partizani	Megi Doçi	83
2025–26	Vllaznia	Apolonia	Megi Doçi	47

- By the end of 2013, Ada had been dissolved, merging with Vllaznia, while retaining the 3 previously won titles under its original name.

=== By titles ===
Team	Home city	Titles
Vllaznia	Shkodër	13
Ada	Velipojë	3
Tirana AS	Tirana	1

== Largest victories ==
As of 3 May 2026

Season	Date	Match	Result
2016–17	22.04.2017	Kinostudio–The Door	30–0
2025–26	14.02.2026	Teuta–Lushnja	28–0
2017–18	11.11.2017	Kinostudio–Bilisht Sport	27–0
2023–24	09.03.2024	Partizani–Skënderbeu	24–0
2023–24	23.03.2024	Apolonia–Teuta	23–0
2023–24	18.11.2023	Skënderbeu–Tirana	0–23
2020–21	21.11.2020	Tirana AS–Bilisht Sport	23–0
2013–14	13.04.2014	Juban Danja–Apolonia	23–6
2018–19	06.04.2019	Kinostudio–Pogradeci	22–0
2016–17	29.10.2016	Kinostudio–Skënderbeu	22–0
2023–24	08.10.2023	Vllaznia–Teuta	21–0
2020–21	14.11.2020	Bilisht Sport–Apolonia	0–21
2019–20	24.06.2020	Dajti–Vllaznia	0–21
2018–19	24.11.2018	Bilisht Sport–Kinostudio	0–21
2012–13	23.03.2013	Shkëndija Durrës–Juban Danja	0–21
2021–22	26.02.2022	Apolonia–Skënderbeu	20–0
2016–17	17.12.2016	The Door–Vllaznia	0–20
2014–15	13.12.2014	Kinostudio–AAS	20–1
2013–14	29.03.2014	Apolonia–Kinostudio	0–20

== See also ==
- Albanian Women's Cup
- List of football clubs in Albania
