= FK Kukësi (women) =

Albanian football club

- Full name: Klubi i Futbollit për Femra Kukësi
- Nickname: Armata e Veriut
- Founded: 13 November 2013; 12 years ago
- Dissolved: 2023
- Ground: Zeqir Ymeri Stadium
- Capacity: 5,200
- President: Safet Gjici
- Manager: Artim Šakiri
- League: Albanian Women's National Championship
- 2013–14: Women's National Championship, 2nd

FK Kukësi (women) were an Albanian women's professional football club based in Kukës. They last competed in Kategoria Superiore Femra during the 2022–23 season, finishing ninth in a ten-team league.

== History ==
Kukësi was established on 13 November 2013. The team made its debut on 11 January 2014, in a 2–2 draw against FC Kinostudio, with Sara Merovci scoring the first ever goal in club history. The team, coached by Genc Tamniku, consisted mostly of players from neighbouring Kosovo, with Sava Sallahi being the only local player.

The team's highest achievement came during the 2014–15 season when they finished as runners-up in both the league championship and the domestic cup.

Kukësi played their home matches at Zeqir Ymeri Stadium, renovated in 2012.

== Honours ==
Kategoria Superiore Femra:

Runners-up (1): 2014–15

Albanian Women's Cup:

Runners-up (1): 2014–15

== Presidents ==
Name	Period	Honours
(Albania) Safet Gjici	2015–	

== Managers ==
Name	Period from	Period to	Honours
(North Macedonia) Artim Šakiri	10 August 2014		
