= KF Belshi =

Albanian football club

- Full name: Klubi i Futbollit Belshi
- Founded: c. 2010s
- Dissolved: 2016
- Owner: Bashkia Belsh
Home colours	Away colours

KF Belshi was an Albanian football club based in Belsh. They are currently not competing in the senior football league.
