= Arbnora de Leoni =

Kosovo Albanian footballer and padel player

Personal information
- Full name: Arbnora de Leoni
- Birth name: Arbnora Robelli
- Date of birth: 3 September 1992 (age 34)
- Height: 1.74 m (5 ft 9 in)
- Position: Forward

Youth career
- Snöstorp Nyhem FF
- SNFF
- –2010: IS Halmia
- → IS Örnia (loan)

Senior career*
Years	Team	Apps	(Gls)
2010–2012	Falkenbergs FF		
2012–2016	IS Halmia		
2016–2020	Halmstads BK		
2022–	Halmstads BK		

International career
2011–2017	Albania	18	(2)
- * Club domestic league appearances and goals

Arbnora de Leoni (née Robelli; born 3 September 1992) is a former footballer and currently a padel player who represents Kosovo.

== International career ==
De Leoni was part of the inaugural Albania women's national team in 2011, where she received a call up in November for a friendly against Macedonia. She was part of the Albania national team for six years, playing in 18 matches and scoring two goals. Her last international match was on 28 November 2017 against Switzerland in Biel/Bienne.

== Personal life ==
De Leoni was born to Kosovo Albanian parents from Gjilan. Her brother Arbër also played football. She also has a bachelor's degree in social psychology and was a contestant on Miss World Sweden 2012, where she reached the last 32, along with four other Swedish Albanian contestants.
