= Albanian Ajax School =

Albanian football club

A.A.S.
- Full name: Albanian Ajax School
- Founded: 20 August 2012; 13 years ago
- Dissolved: 10 September 2022, merged with KFF Laçi
- Ground: Kompleksi Sportive Albanian Ajax School, Shkodër
- Capacity: 500
- Chairman: Arben Haveri
- League: Women's National Championship
- 2017–18: Women's National Championship, 6th

Albanian Ajax School (AAS) were an Albanian women's professional football club based in Shkodër. They last competed in Kategoria Superiore Femra during the 2020–21 season, finishing tenth in a twelve-team league.

== History ==
AAS academy formed a women's team on 20 August 2012, further expanding women's football, becoming the third professional team in the Shkodër region, after Ada and Juban Danja. Under the leadership of Entri Çaku, AAS would make their debut in the national championship during the 2014–15 season, having received approval by the Albanian Football Federation to participate. Former player Alfrida Uruçi was approached to take on the role of player/coach. The first goal in team history was scored by Sabina Lumaj in the match against Vllaznia.
