= FC Term =

Albanian football club

- Full name: Football Club Term Tirana
- Founded: 2010
- Ground: Olimpiku Stadium; Yrshek, Kashar
- Capacity: 1,500
- League: Kategoria e Tretë
- 2018–19: Kategoria e Dytë, Group B (withdrew)

FC Term is a football team that is based in Tirana, Albania. They currently play in the Albanian Third Division.

FC Term also has academy teams, particularly U-19 and U-17 teams

== First Team ==
Term was founded in 2010. Since then, it has participated in the Albanian Third Division. In the 2018 Albanian Third Division, they finished second, but due to the financial difficulties of the champions Rubiku, they qualified instead, marking their first season in the Albanian Second Division.

== U-19 and U-17 ==
FC Term U-19 is one of the best teams in Albania for youth teams. They participate in the Albanian U-19 First Division(second level on the Albanian soccer system), where they currently rank first. FC Term U-17 currently participates in the Albanian U-17 First Division.
