= KFF Tirana =

Association football club in Albania

- Full name: Klubi i Futbollit për Femra Tirana
- Nickname: Tirona
- Founded: 2009; 2020 (reemerged)
- Ground: Skënder Halili Complex
- Capacity: 500
- Owner(s): Refik Halili (66%); Bashkia Tiranë (34%)
- President: Goldi Halili
- Manager: Alpin Gallo
- League: Kategoria Superiore Femra
- 2023–2024: 3rd
- Website: kftirana.al
Home colours	Away colours

KFF Tirana are an Albanian women's professional football club based in Tirana. Part of the multi-disciplinary sports club, SK Tirana, they last competed in Kategoria Superiore Femra during the 2023–24 season, finishing third in a ten-team league. Their home ground is the Skënder Halili Complex.

== History ==
In an effort to promote women’s football in Albania, Genc Ymeraj founded a team in Korçë, later placing it under the supervision of record-breaking athlete Denisa Thëngjilli. Returning to Tirana, Ymeraj took on the ambitious challenge of establishing a professional women’s team under the banner of SK Tirana, a club with a storied history dating back to its founding in 1920.

Coached by former Albania international Skënder Hodja, the roster featured talented players such as Aurora Seranaj, Ana Baro, Luljeta Plaka, Mirela Cemeri, Margarita Gjinaj, Sara Plepi, Iris Begiraga and Anxhi Sallaku. Despite the potential within the squad, the team struggled due to lack of support from the parent club, SK Tirana.

The club’s brief existence culminated in just one official match in 2009, a 1–3 loss to Rubiku.

KFF Tirana would reemerge again during the 2020–21 season.

== Honours ==
=== Domestic ===
- Kategoria Superiore Femra

Runners-up (1): 2022–2023

=== Regional ===
- Kosovo Independency Cup
  - Winners: 2018

== Players ==
=== Squad ===
Note: Flags indicate national team as defined under FIFA eligibility rules; some limited exceptions apply. Players may hold more than one non-FIFA nationality.

No.	Pos.	Nation	Player
1	GK	ALB	Klesjana Spaho
3	MF	ALB	Ketrina Simoni
5	DF	ALB	Anisa Kotarja
6	DF	ALB	Klarina Goro
7	FW	ALB	Daniela Kodra
10	FW	ALB	Mikaela Metalla
11	DF	ALB	Jehona Coka
14	FW	ALB	Antonela Kostaj

No.	Pos.	Nation	Player
15	GK	ALB	Xhoana Muho
19	DF	ALB	Ina Gjoni
23	FW	ALB	Ernisa Aliaj
25	MF	ALB	Olesia Kamberi
55	DF	ALB	Rexhina Maxhalaku (captain)
77	FW	ALB	Klesjana Goro
99	GK	ALB	Klea Mancellari

== Managers ==
- (Albania) Edmond Ruci (1 January 2020 — 30 June 2021 )
- (Albania) Alpin Gallo (1 July 2021 — )
