= Loni Papuçiu Stadium =

Albanian football stadium

- Interactive map of Loni Papuçiu Stadium
- Full name: Loni Papuçiu Stadium
- Location: Rruga R. Aranitasi, Lagjia 16, Fier, Albania
- Coordinates: 40°43′15″N 19°33′08″E
- Owner: Apolonia; Fier Municipality
- Operator: Apolonia
- Capacity: 3,159
- Surface: Grass

Construction
- Opened: 1958
- Renovated: 2014

Tenant
- Apolonia

Loni Papuçiu Stadium (Albanian: Stadiumi Loni Papuçiu) is a multi-use stadium in Fier, Albania which is used as the home ground of local football club Apolonia. It was built in 1958 and has been the Apolonia's home ground ever since. The stadium has a seated capacity of 6,800.

The stadium was reconstructed in 2013, and was completed 7 months later in February 2014 in time for a home fixture against Ada on 15 February 2014. The reconstruction of the stadium involved the installation of floodlights for the first time, a brand new field and 4,000 plastic seating all around the stadium.
