= Arena e Demave =

Sports facility in Tirana, Albania

Coordinates: 41.3562573°N 19.85127°E

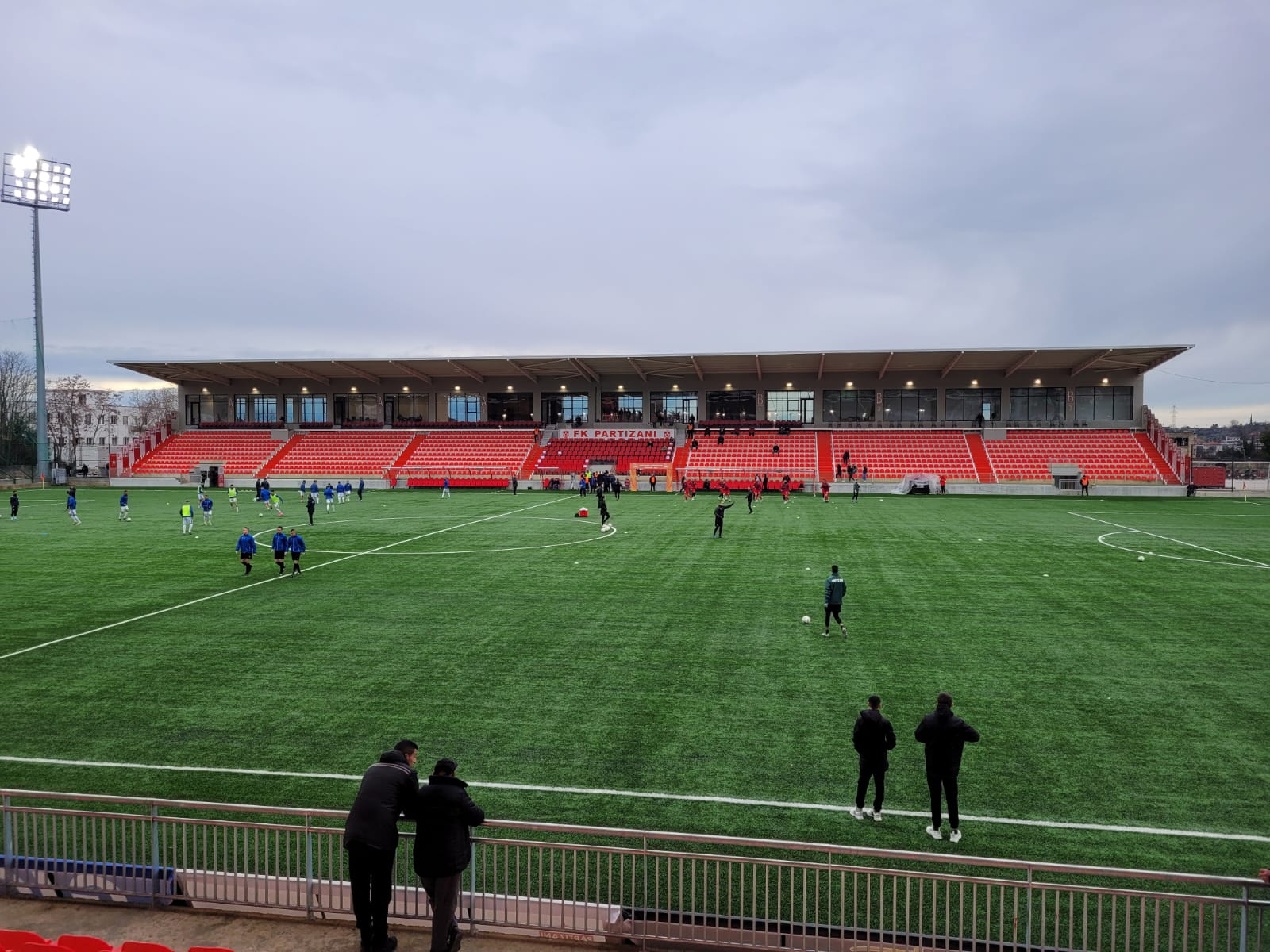
- Interactive map of Arena e Demave
- Full name: Arena e Demave
- Location: Tufinë, Tirana
- Owner: Partizani
- Operator: Partizani
- Capacity: 3,959
- Type: Sports facility

Construction
- Groundbreaking: August 2016
- Built: 2016–2022
- Renovated: 2026
- Project managers: Project & People
- General contractor: Gjoka Konstruksion

Tenant
- Partizani (2022–)

The Arena e Demave is the training ground and academy base of Albanian football club, Partizani.

== Development ==
On 9 March 2016, the Albanian government agreed to a 99-year, €1 lease of the 37,000m^{2} Military Base 4030, located on Myslym Keta Road on the outskirts of Tirana known as Tufinë, which is where Partizani will build their new training complex as well as their proposed 4,500 seater stadium.
