= KFF Lushnja =

Albanian football club

Lushnja
- Full name: Klubi i Futbollit për Femra Lushnja
- Founded: 2020; 5 years ago
- Ground: Lushnjë, Albania
- League: Kategoria Superiore Femra
- 2024–25: 10th
Home colours	Away colours

KFF Lushnja are an Albanian women's professional football club based in Lushnjë. They last competed in Kategoria Superiore Femra during the 2023–24 season, finishing at the bottom table in a ten-team league.
