= FK Partizani Tirana (women) =

Albanian football club

KFF Partizani Tirana
- Full name: Futboll Klubi për Femra Partizani Tirana
- Nickname: Demat e kuq
- Ground: Arena e Demave
- Capacity: 4,500
- President: Gazmend Demi
- Head Coach: Orges Shehi
- League: Kategoria Superiore Femra
- 2024-25: Kategoria Superiore Femra, 34th
- Website: partizani.al/sq/category/femrat
Home colours	Away colours

FK Partizani Tirana (women) are an Albanian women's football club based in Tirana. They play their home games at the Arena e Demave Stadium and they compete in the Women's National Championship.
