= KFF Dajti =

Albanian football club

- Full name: Klubi i Futbollit për Femra Dajti
- Founded: 2013; 13 years ago
- Dissolved: 2020
- League: Women's National Championship
- 2019–20: 9th
Home colours	Away colours

KFF Dajti were an Albanian women's professional football club based in Tirana. They last competed in Kategoria Superiore Femra during the 2019–20 season, finishing ninth in a ten-team league.
