= List of Albania women's international footballers =

This is a non-exhaustive list of Albania women's international footballers – association football players who have appeared at least once for the senior Albania women's national football team.

== Players ==
Key
**Bold**	Named to the national team in the past year

Name	Caps	Goals	National team years	Club(s)	Ref.
**Arbiona Bajraktari**	26	1		(Albania) Vllaznia	
Erida Bajrakurtaj	2	0	2014–2017		
Zylfije Bajramaj	12	1	2017–	(Albania) Vllaznia	
Ana Baro	6	0	2013–2014		
**Sara Begallo**	6	0	2019–	(Albania) Partizani	
Lavdie Begolli	11	1	2017–2019		
Markela Bejleri	1	0	2020	(United States) Quinnipiac Bobcats	
Xhemile Berisha	13	0	2013–2016		
Ellvana Curo	12	0	2013–2015		
**Arbenita Curraj**	16	0		(Albania) Vllaznia	
**Megi Doçi**	32	8	2014–	(Albania) Vllaznia	
Greis Domi	3	0	2015–2017		
Elizabeta Ejupi					
**Endrina Elezaj**	17	0		(Kosovo) Mitrovica	
**Ezmiralda Franja**	34	0	2014–	(Albania) Vllaznia	
**Luçije Gjini**	39	2	2013–	(Albania) Vllaznia	
Pellumbesha Gjyli	20	0	2013–2016		
Fitore Govori (Note: Later represented Kosovo.)	15	0	2013–2016		
**Mimoza Hamidi**	8	2		(Switzerland) Basel	
**Klea Hamonikaj**	1	0		(Albania) Apolonia	
Saranda Hashani	10	1	2016–2019		
Gresa Haziri	1	0	2018		
**Alma Hilaj**	11	0		(Italy) Orobica	
**Antigona Hyska**	17	0		(Albania) Vllaznia	
Suada Jashari	22	2	2013–2020	Retired	
Floralba Krasniqi					
**Qendresa Krasniqi**	25	1		(Albania) Vllaznia	
Kujtime Kurbogaj	10	1	2015–2017		
**Vanesa Levenaj**	6	0		(Albania) Vllaznia	
Vanesa Levendi	2	0	2018–2020		
**Esi Lufo**	3	1	2019–	(Albania) Vllaznia	
Cyme Lulaj	27	0	2013–2018	(Albania) Kinostudio	
**Kristina Maksuti**	15	1		(Norway) Klepp	
**Sara Maliqi**	28	0		(Albania) Vllaznia	
Dafina Memedov	14	0	2013–2017		
Anna Memija	1	0		(United States) Kent State Golden Flashes	
**Mikaela Metalla**	5	0		(Albania) Tirana	
Geldona Morina	28	1	2013–2020		
Aidena Mustafaj	5	0	2018–2020		
Denisa Proto					
Arta Rama					
**Viona Rexhepi**					
Arbnora Robelli					
**Albina Rrahmani**					
Klaudia Rrotani					
Egzona Seljimi					
Aurora Seranaj					
**Valentina Troka**					
**Armela Tukaj**					
Furtuna Velaj					
**Xhulia Xhindole**					
Marigona Zani					
**Ilarja Zarka**					
Egzona Zeka					

== See also ==
- Albania women's national football team
