= KF Ada =

Albanian football club

Ada
- Full name: Klubi i Futbollit Ada
- Founded: 6 March 1996; 30 years ago
- Dissolved: 2023
- Ground: Fusha Sportive Adriatik
- Capacity: 1,200
- President: Alfred Pjetri
- League: Kategoria e Tretë
- 2022–23: Kategoria e Dytë, Group A, 11th (relegated)

KF Ada were an Albanian football club based in Velipojë. The club's home ground was Fusha Sportive Adriatik.

== History ==
KF Ada was established on 6 March 1996 as a sports association by Lazër Matia, Alfred Pjetri, Filip Kercunga, Marash Qytetza and Prend Përndreca. The club’s name was inspired by Ada Bojana, an island in the Adriatic Sea located just across the border in Montenegro. It succeeded an earlier local side, KS Velipoja, which had been operated by the municipal authorities until financial support was withdrawn and the club ceased operations.

Beginning its competitive history in the Albanian Third Division, KF Ada quickly earned promotion to the Albanian Second Division. The club achieved its greatest success during the 2004–05 season, when it won the Second Division promotion playoffs by defeating KS Burreli 2–1 in the final, securing its first promotion to the Albanian First Division.

== Women’s team ==
Women’s football was introduced at national level in Albania during the 2009–10 season. Ada quickly emerged as one of the country’s strongest clubs, winning both the Albanian Cup and the Albanian Championship in the 2010–11 season.

Ada became the first club from Albania to participate in the UEFA Women's Champions League, making its debut in the 2011–12 season. The team competed in the tournament for three consecutive seasons but was eliminated in the qualifying round on each occasion.

The women’s section was dissolved following the 2012–13 season. Its players and coaching staff subsequently joined newly formed KFF Vllaznia.

During its brief existence, Ada won three consecutive Albanian women’s league titles (2009–10, 2010–11 and 2011–12) and one Albanian Women’s Cup (2010–11).
