= KFF Teuta =

Albanian football club

- Full name: Klubi i Futbollit për Femra Teuta
- Ground: Niko Dovana Stadium
- League: Kategoria Superiore Femra
- 2024–25: 9th
Home colours	Away colours

KFF Teuta is an Albanian women's football club based in Durrës. They compete in the Kategoria Superiore Femra.
