= FK Apolonia Fier (women) =

Albanian football club

KFF Apolonia
- Full name: Klubi i Futbollit për Femra Apolonia
- Founded: 28 August 2013; 12 years ago
- Ground: Loni Papuçiu Stadium
- Capacity: 8,800
- Owner: Koço Kokëdhima
- League: Kategoria Superiore Femra
- 2024–2025: 3rd
Home colours	Away colours	Third colours

KFF Apolonia is an Albanian women's football club based in Fier. They compete in the Kategoria Superiore Femra.

== History ==
Apolonia women's football team was established on 28 August 2013. Most of the initial team members had never played football before, but under the leadership of Arben Ymeraj, Apolonia achieved commendable results. The team has twice finished as runner-up in the league standings and has reached the final of the Albanian Cup three times.

== Players ==
=== Current team ===
As of 11 May 2024

Note: Flags indicate national team as defined under FIFA eligibility rules; some limited exceptions apply. Players may hold more than one non-FIFA nationality.

No.	Pos.	Nation	Player
1	GK	ALB	Antigoni Hyska
12	GK	ALB	Amelia Mone
99	DF	ALB	Xhulia Xhindole (C)
—	DF	GHA	Beatrice Sesu
—	DF	BRA	Áhlice Guedes
—	DF	GHA	Afia Nyarko
10	MF	ALB	Vanesa Levenaj

No.	Pos.	Nation	Player
—	MF	NGA	Ogechi Ukwuoma
14	MF	ALB	Klea Hamonikaj
19	MF	CMR	Nicole Ndjock
4	MF	GHA	Felicia Owusu
9	FW	ALB	Anela Vishkulli
7	FW	ALB	Xhesika Ndoj
8	FW	BRA	Bruna Tenutti
19	FW	SSD	Deborah Luka
