= The Door (Albania) =

Albanian football club

The Door Albania
- Full name: Football Club The Door
- Founded: 20 April 2007; 19 years ago
- Dissolved: 2017
- Ground: Shkodër, Albania
- League: Kategoria Superiore Femra

The Door were an Albanian women's professional football club based in Shkodër. They last competed in Kategoria Superiore Femra during the 2016–17 season, finishing at the bottom table, in a ten-team league.

== History ==
During the late 1990s, Norwegian organization Norsk Nødhjelp initiated the creation of a non-profit NGO called "The Door," aimed at providing hope for people in need, around parts of northern Albania. "The Door" began its activities by distributing aid to families in Shkodër and the surrounding region. Later, it focused on the Kosovo crisis, primarily offering services to children traumatized by the war. The name "The Door" translates to "dera" in the Albanian language, symbolizing a door of support and hope for everyone, regardless of age, gender or status.

In the mid-2000s, "The Door" started organizing football teams for boys and girls, prioritizing the youth. On 20 April 2007, a professional women's team was officially established. Like other women's football teams in the region, "The Door" faced initial challenges but continued its journey undeterred. Kastriot Faci managed the club's sports program during this time.

The club has participated in several international tournaments, competing in Norway under coach Fatmir Axhani and later in Italy, Kosovo, and other locations. Notable achievements include taking second place in the "Kaçanik Liberation Cup" and participating in the "International Independence Cup," where they competed against Brescia from Italy, led by coach Saimir Keçi.

Several players from "The Door" have gone on to represent the Albania women's national football team, including goalkeeper Brilanta Kokiçi, Fatjona Borova, Ornela Smajli, Erida Bajrakurtaj and captain Marsela Djegesina, a yearly contender for the championship's golden boot award. Alaskan born Megan Sassman, who came to Shkodër with her husband as a Peace Corps volunteer, also played for the team, alongside fellow Americans Cathleen Gustafson, Francis Anderson, and Trisha Elizabeth, who were among the first foreigners playing in the women's league. Over time, players from neighboring countries and distant Africa also joined the club's ranks.
