= Tirana AS =

Albanian football club

- Full name: Klubi i Futbollit për Femra Tirana AS
- Nickname: Tirona
- Founded: 9 August 2007; 18 years ago
- Dissolved: 10 September 2022, merged with Gramshi
- Ground: Selman Stërmasi Stadium
- Capacity: 12,600
- Manager: Oltion Kernaja
- League: Kategoria Superiore Femra
- 2018-2019: 2nd

Tirana AS were an Albanian women's professional football club based in Tirana. They last competed in Kategoria Superiore Femra during the 2021–22 season, finishing tenth in an eleven-team league.

== History ==
Noticing the absence of a professional women's football team in Tirana, Genc Ymeraj, along with several talented young footballers at the time, led by captain Aurora Seranaj, formed the Tirana Art-Sport club (Tirana AS). This private initiative was entirely independent of other sports clubs in the Albanian capital.

Tirana AS was officially established on August 9, 2007. The team made its debut in the first national women’s tournament, the “Promotion Cup,” held in Sarandë that same month. This tournament featured teams such as Rubiku, Juban Danja and a team from Korçë, captained by national athletics champion Denisa Thëngjilli.

Other key players who contributed to the club's early beginnings included Ana Baro, Aida Miço, Elira Muçaj, Arjana Rexhmati and Oliverta Ylli.

Managed by former Albania men's national team player, Altin Rraklli, Tirana AS were crowned champions of the inaugural women's football championship on 28 January 2009, following a 4–0 victory over Juban Danja. The team repeated their success by winning the first Cup trophy, defeating The Door by a score of 6–0.

== Honours ==
=== Domestic ===
Kategoria Superiore Femra

Winners (1): 2009–10
Runners-up (5): 2010–11, 2011–12, 2015–16, 2017–18, 2018–19

Albanian Women's Cup

Winners (1): 2009–10
Runners-up (1): 2017–18

=== Regional ===
Kosovo Independence Cup

Winners (1): 2018
