= KFF Vllaznia =

Albanian women's football club

Vllaznia
- Full name: Klubi i Futbollit të Femrave Vllaznia
- Nickname: Kuqeblutë
- Founded: 2013; 13 years ago
- Ground: Loro Boriçi Stadium
- Capacity: 16,000
- President: Lazer Matiaj
- Manager: Nikolin Leka
- League: Kategoria Superiore Femra
- 2025-26: Champions
- Website: vllaznia.al
Home colours	Away colours

Klubi i Futbollit të Femrave Vllaznia is an Albanian women's professional football club based in Shkodër. The club is considered by UEFA to be the successor club to Ada, which disbanded in 2013. They play their homes games at the Reshit Rusi Stadium and compete in Kategoria Superiore Femra. In conjunction with Ada, the franchise have won eleven consecutive titles, including an unbeaten run in the domestic league from 2013 to 2023 (conceding only 40 goals) which was only broken due to a disciplinary decision from the league. Vllaznia is a concept in Albanian culture often translated as "brotherhood;" it refers to loyalty to one's fis (clan, tribe).

== History ==
Over the years, Ada Velipojë evolved, with Lazër Matia spearheading the formation of a Vllaznia women's team, dissolving Ada into it, therefore putting on the red and blue jerseys and continuing their winning streak. They achieved international success during the 2019-20 season when they reached the top 32 teams in the UEFA Women's Champions League.

In 2017, Vllaznia triumphed in the Balkan tournament held in Alexandroupolis, Greece, with decisive victories over its counterparts Tiverija of Strumica (6–1), Breznica of Pljevlja (1–0) and in the final against Thrace (7–0). The squad, coached by Nikolin Leka, included players like Ardiola Raxhimi, Valbona Lipe, Arbiona Bajraktari and others.

== Honours ==
Kategoria Superiore Femra:

Winners (13) : 2013–14, 2014–15, 2015–16, 2016–17, 2017–18, 2018–19, 2019–20, 2020–21, 2021–22, 2022–23, 2023–24, 2024–25, 2025-26

Albanian Women's Cup:

Winners (10): 2013–14, 2014–15, 2015–16, 2016–17, 2017–18, 2018–19, 2019–20, 2020–21, 2021–22, 2022–23

== Europe Statistics ==
=== By season ===
UEFA Women's Champions League(Update: 7 September 2024)
Season	Competition	Round	Opposition	Home	Away	Agg.
2014–15	UEFA Women's; Champions League	QS	(Faroe Islands) KÍ Klaksvík	—N/a	2–1	3rd
2014–15	UEFA Women's; Champions League	QS	(Cyprus) Apollon Limassol	—N/a	0–0	3rd
2014–15	UEFA Women's; Champions League	QS	(Lithuania) Gintra Universitetas	0–5	—N/a	3rd
2015–16	UEFA Women's; Champions League	QS	(Belarus) FC Minsk	0–3	—N/a	4rd
2015–16	UEFA Women's; Champions League	QS	(Bosnia and Herzegovina) SFK 2000	—N/a	0–5	4rd
2015–16	UEFA Women's; Champions League	QS	(Turkey) Konak Belediyespor	—N/a	1–5	4rd
2016–17	UEFA Women's; Champions League	QS	(Switzerland) FC Zürich	—N/a	0–3	4rd
2016–17	UEFA Women's; Champions League	QS	(Slovenia) ŽNK Pomurje	—N/a	1–6	4rd
2016–17	UEFA Women's; Champions League	QS	(Slovakia) Slovan Bratislava	1–2	—N/a	4rd
2017–18	UEFA Women's; Champions League	QS	(Bosnia and Herzegovina) SFK 2000	—N/a	1–0	2nd
2017–18	UEFA Women's; Champions League	QS	(Greece) PAOK	0–1	—N/a	2nd
2017–18	UEFA Women's; Champions League	QS	(Luxembourg) Bettembourg	—N/a	2–0	2nd
2018–19	UEFA Women's; Champions League	QS	(Bosnia and Herzegovina) SFK 2000	—N/a	0–5	2nd
2018–19	UEFA Women's; Champions League	QS	(Estonia) Pärnu	3–1	—N/a	2nd
2018–19	UEFA Women's; Champions League	QS	(Moldova) Agarista-ȘS Anenii Noi	—N/a	4–1	2nd
2019–20	UEFA Women's; Champions League	QS	(Republic of Ireland) Wexford Youths	—N/a	3–1	1st
2019–20	UEFA Women's; Champions League	QS	(Malta) Birkirkara	1–0	—N/a	1st
2019–20	UEFA Women's; Champions League	QS	(Lithuania) Gintra Universitetas	1–1	—N/a	1st
2019–20	UEFA Women's; Champions League	R32	(Denmark) Fortuna Hjørring	0–1	0–2	0–3
2020–21	UEFA Women's; Champions League	1QR	(Turkey) ALG Spor	3–3 (3–2 p)	—N/a	3–3 (3–2 p)
2020–21	UEFA Women's; Champions League	2QR	(Belarus) Minsk	0–2	—N/a	0–2
2021–22	UEFA Women's; Champions League	1QR	(Hungary) Ferencváros	0−0 (3–1 p)	—N/a	0−0 (3–1p)
2021–22	UEFA Women's; Champions League	2QR	(Italy) Juventus	0−2	0−1	0–3
2022–23	UEFA Women's; Champions League	1QR	(Slovakia) Spartak Myjava	—N/a	1–0	1–0
2022–23	UEFA Women's; Champions League	2QR	(Ukraine) Vorskla-Kharkiv-2	2–1	1–1	3–2
2022–23	UEFA Women's; Champions League	GS	(England) Chelsea	0−4	0–8	4th
2022–23	UEFA Women's; Champions League	GS	(France) Paris Saint-Germain	0–4	0–5	4th
2022–23	UEFA Women's; Champions League	GS	(Spain) Real Madrid	0−2	1−5	4th
2023–24	UEFA Women's; Champions League	1QR	(Kosovo) EP-COM Hajvalia	4–2	—N/a	4–2
2023–24	UEFA Women's; Champions League	1QR	(Iceland) Valur	—N/a	1–2	1−2
2024–25	UEFA Women's; Champions League	1QR	(Georgia (country)) Lanchkhuti	3–0	—N/a	3–0
2024–25	UEFA Women's; Champions League	1QR	(Austria) St. Pölten	0−1	—N/a	0−1
2025–26	UEFA Women's; Champions League	2QR	(Belarus) Dinamo Minsk	1–2	—N/a	1–2
2025–26	UEFA Women's; Champions League	2QR	(Luxembourg) Racing Union	—N/a	1−3	1−3
2025–26	UEFA Women's; Europa Cup	1QR	(Ukraine) Kolos Kovalivka	2–0	0–2	4–0
2025–26	UEFA Women's; Europa Cup	2QR	(Italy) Inter Milan	TBD	0–7	–

== Players ==
=== Current squad ===
As of 8 October 2025

Note: Flags indicate national team as defined under FIFA eligibility rules; some limited exceptions apply. Players may hold more than one non-FIFA nationality.

No.	Pos.	Nation	Player
1	GK	CAN	Dior Wilson
2	DF	GUA	Jemery Myvett
3	MF	ALB	Riselda Leba
4	DF	ALB	Suzanë Vuksani
5	DF	ALB	Arbiona Bajraktari
6	MF	CAN	Natalie Štrkalj
7	MF	USA	Teresa Deda
8	MF	KOS	Verona Berisha
9	FW	ALB	Klaudia Borci
11	FW	ALB	Megi Doçi (captain)
12	GK	PAR	Cristina Recalde
13	FW	MEX	Anahí Rentería

No.	Pos.	Nation	Player
15	MF	USA	Anakah Madril
17	MF	ALB	Marinela Ndoci
19	FW	USA	Jennessa Groves
20	MF	PAN	Carmen Montenegro
21	DF	ALB	Herta Hasaj
23	FW	ALB	Egla Hoxha
24	MF	ALB	Drilona Mataj
26	DF	PAN	Mireilis Rojas
27	FW	ALB	Lusil Cungu
28	DF	ALB	Jylisa Kolekaj
29	DF	MEX	Claudia Cid
30	DF	USA	Miamour Mesa

== Managers ==
- (Albania) Fatmir Axhani & Hava Axheri (2010–2013)
- (Albania) Selami Pepaj (25 June 2013 – 1 June 2015)
- (Albania) Nikolin Leka (1 July 2015 – 1 June 2023)
- (Albania) Haris Lika (1 August 2023– )
