= Juban Danja =

Albanian football club

- Full name: Klubi i Futbollit për Femra Juban Danja
- Founded: 6 September 2005; 20 years ago
- Dissolved: 2021
- Ground: Reshit Rusi Stadium
- Capacity: 1,200
- League: Kategoria Superiore Femra
- 2020–21: 5th

Juban Danja were an Albanian women's professional football club based in Juban, Shkodër. They last competed in Kategoria Superiore Femra during the 2020–21 season, finishing fifth in a twelve-team league.

== History ==
Juban Danja was founded on September 6, 2005, in Gur i Zi, a municipal unit within Shkodër County. Known as the “Kingdom of Juban", the pioneering club was the brainchild of Ferdinand Jaku, a distinguished medical professional and an ardent football enthusiast. It all began when Jaku built a small football field in the village of the same name, inviting locals to play. Among the first players were members of the Jaku family – Lizana, Emanuela and young Paula. The inaugural Juban Danja team also featured Terezina Lazri, Tereza and Marie Ilia, Xhuljeta Preçi, Dorina Gjoni, Albina Gjuraj, Eleni and Agetina Marku, Agetina and Vera Ndrea, Manjola Ejlli and Terezina Palushi.

Juban Danja became the first women’s football club in the country to establish a full administrative structure, including a president, coaching staff, official jerseys and its own logo. Lacking local competition in its early years, the team played in friendlies against Kosova Prishtinë VR and Vizioni Ferizaj from Kosovo, establishing a long-lasting partnership with these clubs.

The club has won two National Cup trophies. In 2013, they won the Medin Zhega Memorial Tournament, in honor of the former Albania national team footballer and coach.

== Honours ==
Albanian Women's Cup:

Winners (2): 2011–12, 2012–13
Runners-up (2): 2010–11, 2013–14

Medin Zhega Cup:

Winners (1): 2013

7–8 March Cup:

Winners (1): 2013

== List of managers ==
- (Albania) Gjon Ndreka (2006–2011)
- (Albania) Kreshnik Krepi (10 November 2011–2013)
- (Albania) Paulin Zefi (2012)
- (Albania) Emanuela Jaku (2013–2014)
- (Albania) Kreshnik Krepi (2014–)
