= FC Kinostudio =

Albanian football club

- Full name: Klubi i Futbollit për Femra Kinostudio
- Founded: 8 July 2009; 16 years ago
- Chairman: Gjin Gjonpalaj
- Manager: Gëzim Gjonpalaj
- League: Kategoria Superiore Femra
- 2024–25: 6th
Home colours	Away colours

FC Kinostudio is an Albanian women's professional football club based in Tirana. They last competed in Kategoria Superiore Femra during the 2023–24 season, finishing fifth in a ten-team league.

== History ==
Kinostudio was established on 8 July 2009 under the leadership of youth coach Gëzim Gjonpalaj. Several players from Tirana AS, previously coached by Skënder Hodja and later Hiqmet Hasko, joined the team. Despite their youth and inexperience, the Kinostudio girls excelled in domestic friendlies and in neighbouring Kosovo, competing against teams like Llapi, Trepça and Vizioni of Ferizaj.

The club has fielded players as young as 13 and 14, in line with the Albanian Football Federation's regulations on limited playing time for this age group. After a successful 2010–11 season in the Women's league, they reached the Cup finals the following year. Young forward Ambra Gjergji won the Golden Boot award in two straight seasons, scoring 66 total goals in the process and receiving a call-up to the Albania women's national team.

Kinostudio formed a close collaboration with the Jakova women's football team, which had recently withdrawn from Kosovo's domestic league, and welcomed players such as Cyme Lulaj, Yllka Dibrani, Endrina Elezi, Sadije Koçi and Mimoza Raja, into its ranks.

== Honours ==
Kategoria Superiore Femra:

Runners–up (1): 2013–14

Albanian Women's Cup:

Runners–up (2): 2011–12, 2015–16
