= 2014–15 Kategoria e Tretë =

Kategoria e Tretë
- Season: 2014–15

The 2014–15 Kategoria e Tretë was the 6th season of the Albanian Third Division in its current format, and 12th season as the fourth tier of football in Albania.

== Participating teams ==
Group A

Team	City/Zone
Ada Velipojë B	Velipojë
Akademia AAS	Shkodër
KF Bulqiza	Bulqizë
Djelmnia Shkodrane	Shkodër
Drini FK 2004	Dibër
FC Eagles	Tirana
KS Flabina	Tirana
Internacionale Tirana FC	Tirana
FC Kevitan	Tirana
Shkëndija Tiranë	Tirana
KF Spartak Tirana	Tirana
Sporting Tirana	Tirana

Group B

Team	City/Zone
Adriatiku 2012	Durrës
KF Fushmbret	Elbasan
Golemi FC	Golem
KF Gramshi	Gramsh
FC Internacional Tirana	Tirana
FK Jehona	Kozarë
Rubiku	Rubik
FK Pajova	Pajovë
Shkëndija Durrës	Durrës
Sopoti Librazhd B	Librazhd
FK Young Boys	Korçë
KF Valbona	Tropojë

== League table ==
=== Group A ===
Pos	Team	Pld	W	D	L	GF	GA	GD	Pts	Promotion
1	Kevitan (C, P)	22	22	0	0	140	6	+134	66	Promotion to 2015–16 Kategoria e Dytë
2	Bulqiza	22	18	1	3	87	22	+65	55	
3	Spartak	22	18	0	4	89	24	+65	54	
4	Eagles	22	15	2	5	61	21	+40	47	
5	Djelmnia Shkodrane	22	11	1	10	54	29	+25	34	
6	Internacionale Tirana	22	11	1	10	65	57	+8	34	
7	Ada B	22	10	4	8	38	37	+1	34	
8	Flabina	22	5	2	15	30	96	−66	17	
9	Akademia AAS	22	5	1	16	24	104	−80	16	
10	Sporting Tirana	22	4	1	17	43	96	−53	13	
11	Drini	22	3	1	18	26	106	−80	10	
12	Shkëndija Tiranë	22	3	0	19	15	74	−59	9	

Source: FSHF
Rules for classification: 1) points; 2) goal difference; 3) number of goals scored.
(C) Champions; (P) Promoted

=== Group B ===
Pos	Team	Pld	W	D	L	GF	GA	GD	Pts	Promotion
1	Internacional Tirana (C, P)	20	16	3	1	54	14	+40	51	Promotion to 2015–16 Kategoria e Dytë
2	Rubiku	20	16	1	3	56	19	+37	49	
3	Golemi	20	12	1	7	34	24	+10	37	
4	Valbona	20	9	5	6	35	32	+3	32	
5	Shkëndija Durrës	20	8	7	5	35	28	+7	31	
6	Fushmbret	20	6	5	9	28	37	−9	23	
7	Adriatiku 2012	20	5	5	10	33	40	−7	20	
8	Young Boys	20	4	5	11	14	32	−18	17	
9	Pajova (Note: Pajova were deducted 3 points from classification.)	20	4	7	9	26	41	−15	16	
10	Jehona	20	3	6	11	20	37	−17	15	
11	Sopoti B	20	2	5	13	14	45	−31	11	
12	Gramshi B (Note: Gramshi B withdrew from the league during the season.)	0	0	0	0	0	0	0	0	

Source: FSHF
Rules for classification: 1) points; 2) goal difference; 3) number of goals scored.
(C) Champions; (P) Promoted
