= List of football stadiums in Albania =

The following is a list of football stadiums in Albania, ranked in order of capacity, with the minimum capacity being 1,000.

== Current stadiums ==
#	Image	Stadium	Capacity	City	Home team(s)	Opened	UEFA rank
1		Arena Kombëtare	22,500	Tirana	Albania NT	2019	4/4 stars
2		Loro Boriçi Stadium	16,000	Shkodër	Albania NT, Vllaznia	1953, 2016	4/4 stars
3		Tomori Stadium	13,350	Berat	Tomori	1985	
4		Elbasan Arena	12,800	Elbasan	Albania NT, KF Elbasani	1967, 2014	4/4 stars
5		Skënderbeu Stadium	12,343	Korçë	Skënderbeu	1957	3/4 stars
6		Niko Dovana Stadium	12,040	Durrës	Teuta	1965	
7		Gjorgji Kyçyku Stadium	6,125	Pogradec	Pogradeci		
8		Selman Stërmasi Stadium	9,600	Tirana	KF Tirana, FK Dinamo	1956, 2015	
9		Roza Haxhiu Stadium	5,500	Lushnjë	Lushnja	1961	
10		Kastrioti Stadium	4,300	Krujë	Kastrioti, Shënkolli		
11		Gjirokastër Stadium	6,200	Gjirokastër	Luftëtari	1961	
12		Flamurtari Stadium	8,200	Vlorë	Flamurtari	1961	
13		Besa Stadium	4,000	Kavajë	Besa	1974	
14		Zeqir Ymeri Stadium	8,000	Kukës	FK Kukësi	2012, 2021	
15		Loni Papuçiu Stadium	6,800	Fier	Apolonia	1958	
16		Nexhip Trungu Stadium	6,600	Cerrik	Turbina		
17		Korabi Stadium	6,000	Peshkopi	Korabi		
18		Adush Muça Stadium	5,200	Ballsh	Bylis		
19		Brian Filipi Stadium	5,000	Lezhë	Besëlidhja		
20		Andon Lapa Stadium	5,000	Sarandë	Butrinti		
22		Bashkim Sulejmani Stadium	5,000	Kuçovë	Naftëtari		
23		Kamëz Stadium	4,800	Kamëz	FC Kamza		
24		FK Partizani Stadium	4,500	Tirana	FK Partizani	u/c	
25		Tefik Jashari Stadium	4,000	Shijak	Erzeni		
26		Rrogozhinë Stadium	4,000	Rrogozhinë	Egnatia		
27		Durim Qypi Stadium	4,000	Përmet	Përmeti		
28		Selenicë Stadium	4,000	Selenicë	Selenicë		
29		Mislim Koçi Stadium	3,100	Gramsh	Gramsh		
30		Sopoti Stadium	3,000	Librazhd	Sopoti	1964	
31		Redi Maloku Stadium	3,000	Fushë-Krujë	Iliria	1991	
32		Liri Ballabani Stadium	2,500	Burrel	Burreli		
33		Panajot Pano Stadium	2,500	Delvinë	Delvina		
34		Laçi Stadium	2,300	Laç	KF Laçi	1980	
35		Alush Noga Stadium	2,150	Patos	Albpetrol		
36		Ersekë Stadium	2,000	Ersekë	Gramozi	1960	
37		Sabaudin Shehu Stadium	2,000	Tepelenë	Tepelena		
38		Petro Ruci Stadium	2,000	Himarë	Himara, Oriku	2012	
39		Kompleksi Vellezërit Duli	2,000	Koplik	Veleçiku		
40		Ismail Xhemali Stadium	1,950	Pukë	Tërbuni		
41		Olimpiku Stadium	1,500	Kashar	Olimpiku, Kevitan, Vora		
42		Skrapar Sports Field	1,500	Skrapar	Skrapari		
43		Reshit Rusi Stadium	1,200	Shkodër	Vllaznia, Ada		
44		Bilisht Stadium	1,050	Bilisht	Bilisht Sport		
45		New Sukth Stadium	1,000	Sukth	Sukthi		
46		Mamurras Stadium	1,000	Mamurras	Adriatiku		
47		Internacional Complex	1,000	Pezë Helmës	Internacional		
48		Domozdova Stadium	1,000	Prrenjas	Domozdova		
49		Karafil Çaushi Stadium	1,000	Memaliaj	Memaliaj		
50		Fusha Sportive Adriatik	1,000	Velipojë	Ada		
51		Çakran Stadium	1,000	Çakran	Çakrani		
52		Rrëshen Stadium	1,000	Rrëshen	Rrësheni		
53		Pojani Stadium	1,000	Pojan	Pojani		
54		Këlcyra Stadium	1,000	Këlcyrë	Këlcyra		
55		Rakip Kryeziu Sports Field	1,000	Çlirim	Çlirimi		

== Former stadiums ==
Stadiums which have been demolished and no longer exist.

Stadium	Capacity	City	Home team(s)	Demolished
Qemal Stafa Stadium	19,700	Tirana	Albania, Partizani; Dinamo; KF Tirana	2016

== See also ==
- Football in Albania
- List of association football stadiums by capacity
- List of European stadiums by capacity
- Lists of stadiums
