= 2017–18 Kategoria e Dytë =

Kategoria e Dytë
- Season: 2017–18
- Champions: Vora; 1st title
- Promoted: Elbasani; Oriku; Veleçiku; Vora
- Relegated: Domozdova
- Matches: 322
- Goals: 1,086 (3.37 per match)
- Biggest home win: Sopoti 9−2 Ada (22 April 2018)
- Biggest away win: Kevitan 0–7 Partizani B (13 May 2018)
- Highest scoring: Skrapari 6−5 Delvina (6 May 2018); Sopoti 9−2 Ada Velipojë (22 April 2018)
- Longest winning run: 10 matches Albpetrol
- Longest unbeaten run: 26 matches Elbasani
- Longest winless run: 11 matches Kevitan
- Longest losing run: 11 matches Kevitan

The 2017–18 Kategoria e Dytë was the 48th official season of the Albanian football third division since its establishment. There were 28 teams competing this season, split into 2 groups, each with 14 teams. The winners of the groups played the league's final against each other and also gained promotion to the 2018-19 Albanian First Division. The runners-up qualified for the play-off round which they played against the 9th ranked teams in the 2017-18 Kategoria e Parë. Elbasani, Oriku, Veleçiku and Vora were promoted to the 2018-19 Kategoria e Parë. Domozdova was relegated to the 2019 Kategoria e Tretë. Vora won their first Kategoria e Dytë title after beating Elbasani in the final match.

== Changes from last season ==
=== Team changes ===
==== From Kategoria e Dytë ====
Promoted to Kategoria e Parë:

- Egnatia
- KF Vllaznia B
- Naftëtari

==== To Kategoria e Dytë ====
Relegated from Kategoria e Parë:

- Adriatiku
- Sopoti
- KF Elbasani

Promoted from Kategoria e Tretë:

- FC Klosi
- Spartaku

=== Locations ===
2017–18 Group A Kategoria e Dytë teams.
2017–18 Group B Kategoria e Dytë teams.

=== Stadia by capacity and locations ===
==== Group A ====
Team	Location	Stadium	Capacity
Luzi 2008	Luz i Vogël	Luz i Vogël Stadium	600
FK Vora	Vorë	Vorë Sports Field	1,000
KF Tirana B	Tirana	Skënder Halili Complex	200
Partizani B	Tirana	National Sports Centre	50
KS Veleçiku	Koplik	Kompleksi Vellezërit Duli	2,000
KF Gramshi	Gramsh	Mislim Koçi Stadium	1,500
FC Internacional Tirana	Tirana	Internacional Complex	1,000
Ada	Velipojë	Adriatik Velipojë	1,200
FK Kukësi B	Kukës	Zeqir Ymeri Stadium	5,000
FC Kevitan	Tirana	Kevitan Complex	500
Adriatiku	Mamurras	Mamurras Stadium	1,000
FC Klosi	Klos	Klos Stadium	1,000
Spartaku	Tirana	Stadiumi "Marko Bocari"	2,500
Sopoti	Librazhd	Sopoti Stadium	3,000

==== Group B ====
Team	Location	Stadium	Capacity
KF Oriku	Orikum	Petro Ruci Stadium	2,000
KS Delvina	Delvinë	Panajot Pano Stadium	2,500
Devolli	Bilisht	Bilisht Stadium	1,050
KF Këlcyra	Këlcyrë	Fusha Sportive Këlcyrë	1,000
KF Butrinti	Sarandë	Butrinti Stadium	5,000
KF Maliqi	Maliq	Fusha Sportive Maliq	400
KF Memaliaj	Memaliaj	Karafil Caushi Stadium	1,500
Domozdova	Prrenjas	Stadiumi Domozdova	1,000
KF Përmeti	Përmet	Durim Qypi Stadium	4,000
FK Tepelena	Tepelenë	Sabaudin Shehu Stadium	2,000
FK Skrapari	Çorovodë	Skrapar Sports Field	1,500
KS Gramozi	Ersekë	Gramozi Stadium	7,000
KF Albpetrol	Patos	Alush Noga Stadium	2,150
KF Elbasani	Elbasan	Elbasan Arena	12,800

== League standings ==
=== Group A ===
Pos	Team	Pld	W	D	L	GF	GA	GD	Pts	Promotion or relegation
1	Vora (C, P)	24	21	1	2	69	20	+49	64	Promotion to 2018–19 Kategoria e Parë
2	Veleçiku (P)	24	20	1	3	62	14	+48	61	Play-off promotion to 2018–19 Kategoria e Parë
3	Klosi	24	17	1	6	47	28	+19	52	
4	Spartaku	24	12	2	10	55	40	+15	38	
5	Partizani B	24	9	8	7	43	31	+12	35	
6	Luzi 2008	24	10	5	9	35	28	+7	35	
7	Gramshi	24	10	2	12	36	39	−3	32	
8	Tirana B	24	8	7	9	36	35	+1	31	
9	Internacional Tirana	24	9	1	14	32	47	−15	28	
10	Sopoti	24	6	5	13	35	44	−9	23	
11	Kukësi B	24	6	4	14	39	56	−17	22	
12	Ada	24	6	1	17	31	78	−47	19	
13	Kevitan	24	2	2	20	24	84	−60	8	
14	Adriatiku (Note: Adriatiku were dissolved during the season and withdrew from the league. They were also deducted 3 points.) (R)	0	0	0	0	0	0	0	−3	Dissolved

Source: Soccerway
Rules for classification: 1) points; 2) goal difference; 3) number of goals scored; 4) head-to-head points; 5) head-to-head goal difference; 6) draw. (Head-to-head record is applied for clubs with the same number of points only once all matches between said clubs have been played.)
(C) Champions; (P) Promoted; (R) Relegated

=== Group B ===
Pos	Team	Pld	W	D	L	GF	GA	GD	Pts	Promotion or relegation
1	Elbasani (P)	26	21	5	0	61	14	+47	68	Promotion to 2018–19 Kategoria e Parë
2	Oriku (Note: Oriku replaced Vllaznia B in the Albanian First Division after their automatic relegation.) (P)	26	21	3	2	57	17	+40	66	Promotion to 2018–19 Kategoria e Parë
3	Albpetrol	26	20	2	4	61	16	+45	62	
4	Devolli	26	12	5	9	51	33	+18	41	
5	Delvina	26	12	2	12	54	44	+10	38	
6	Butrinti	26	10	5	11	44	34	+10	35	
7	Maliqi	26	10	4	12	43	45	−2	34	
8	Këlcyra	26	10	2	14	35	40	−5	32	
9	Skrapari	26	10	2	14	40	75	−35	32	
10	Tepelena	26	9	1	16	31	46	−15	28	
11	Memaliaj	26	8	1	17	20	56	−36	25	
12	Gramozi	26	7	3	16	26	38	−12	24	
13	Përmeti	26	8	0	18	32	57	−25	24	
14	Domozdova (R)	26	6	1	19	24	64	−40	19	Relegation to 2019 Kategoria e Tretë

Source: Soccerway
Rules for classification: 1) points; 2) goal difference; 3) number of goals scored; 4) head-to-head points; 5) head-to-head goal difference; 6) draw. (Head-to-head record is applied for clubs with the same number of points only once all matches between said clubs have been played.)
(P) Promoted; (R) Relegated

== Final ==
17 May 2018
17:00

Elbasani	2−5	Vora
Kotorri 60' (pen.); Dishani 79'		Sejdini 9', 25'; Ferraj 52', 76'; Lacka 86'

Selman Stërmasi Stadium, Tirana
