= 2015–16 Kategoria e Dytë =

Kategoria e Dytë
- Season: 2015–16

The 2015–16 Kategoria e Dytë is being competed between 24 teams in 2 groups, A and B, respectively.

== Changes from last season ==
=== Team changes ===
==== From Kategoria e Dytë ====
Promoted to Kategoria e Parë:

- Erzeni
- Korabi
- Turbina

==== To Kategoria e Dytë ====
Relegated from Kategoria e Parë:

- Naftëtari
- Tomori
- Veleçiku

Promoted from Kategoria e Tretë:

- Internacional Tirana
- Kevitan

== Participating teams ==
Group A

Team	City/Zone
Albpetrol	Patos
Egnatia	Rrogozhinë
Gramshi	Gramsh
Internacional Tirana	Tirana
Kevitan	Tirana
Luzi 2008	Luz i Vogël
Partizani B	Tirana
Shënkolli	Shënkoll
Sukthi	Sukth
Tirana B	Tirana
Veleçiku	Koplik
Vora	Vorë

Group B

Team	City/Zone
Bilisht Sporti	Bilisht
Delvina	Delvinë
Domozdova	Prrenjas
Gramozi	Ersekë
Himara	Himarë
Memaliaj	Memaliaj
Naftëtari	Kuçovë
Oriku	Orikum
Përmeti	Përmet
Skrapari	Skrapar
Tepelena	Tepelenë
Tomori	Berat

== League table ==
=== Group A ===
Pos	Team	Pld	W	D	L	GF	GA	GD	Pts	Promotion or relegation
1	Shënkolli (P)	22	15	4	3	35	12	+23	49	Promotion to 2016–17 Kategoria e Parë
2	Partizani B	22	13	7	2	40	18	+22	46	Play-off promotion to 2016–17 Kategoria e Parë
3	Kevitan	22	13	5	4	35	16	+19	44	
4	Egnatia	22	12	3	7	31	23	+8	39	
5	Albpetrol	22	8	6	8	24	37	−13	30	
6	Veleçiku	22	7	8	7	30	28	+2	29	
7	Vora	22	7	6	9	31	33	−2	27	
8	Gramshi	22	5	6	11	18	27	−9	21	
9	Sukthi (Note: Sukthi were withdraw from the league due to the financial reasons.) (R)	22	4	8	10	25	35	−10	20	Relegation to 2016–17 Kategoria e Tretë
10	Internacional Tirana	22	4	8	10	23	39	−16	20	
11	Tirana B	22	5	4	13	26	46	−20	19	
12	Luzi 2008	22	5	3	14	19	33	−14	18	

Source: Soccerway
Rules for classification: 1) points; 2) goal difference; 3) number of goals scored; 4) head-to-head points; 5) head-to-head goal difference; 6) draw. (Head-to-head record is applied for clubs with the same number of points only once all matches between said clubs have been played.)
(P) Promoted; (R) Relegated

=== Group B ===
Pos	Team	Pld	W	D	L	GF	GA	GD	Pts	Promotion or relegation
1	Tomori (C, P)	22	19	0	3	57	8	+49	57	Promotion to 2016–17 Kategoria e Parë
2	Naftëtari	22	18	0	4	55	25	+30	54	Play-off promotion to 2016–17 Kategoria e Parë
3	Tepelena	21	12	2	7	39	27	+12	38	
4	Delvina	22	11	3	8	41	33	+8	36	
5	Oriku	22	11	2	9	32	22	+10	35	
6	Domozdova	22	10	2	10	40	32	+8	32	
7	Bilisht Sport	21	10	0	11	37	39	−2	30	
8	Përmeti	21	9	2	10	29	37	−8	29	
9	Memaliaj	21	9	1	11	33	32	+1	28	
10	Gramozi	22	6	2	14	24	46	−22	20	
11	Skrapari	22	5	0	17	35	74	−39	15	
12	Himara (R)	22	3	0	19	19	66	−47	9	Relegation to 2016–17 Kategoria e Tretë

Source: Soccerway
Rules for classification: 1) points; 2) goal difference; 3) number of goals scored; 4) head-to-head points; 5) head-to-head goal difference; 6) draw. (Head-to-head record is applied for clubs with the same number of points only once all matches between said clubs have been played.)
(C) Champions; (P) Promoted; (R) Relegated

== Final ==
12 May 2016
17:00

Tomori	2−1 (a.e.t.)	Shënkolli

Qemal Stafa Stadium, Tirana
