= 2018 Kategoria e Tretë =

Kategoria e Tretë
- Season: 2018
- Champions: Rubiku; 1st title
- Promoted: Term
- Matches: 63
- Goals: 260 (4.13 per match)
- Top goalscorer: Kledi Shehu (16 goals)

The 2018 Kategoria e Tretë was the 15th official season of the Albanian football fourth division since its establishment. The season began on 11 February 2018. There were 7 teams competing this season. Term gained promotion to the 2018-19 Kategoria e Dytë. Rubiku won their first Kategoria e Tretë title.

== Changes from last season ==
=== Team changes ===
==== From Third Division ====
Promoted to Albanian Second Division:

- FC Klosi
- Spartaku
2018 Kategoria e Tretë teams.

=== Stadia by capacity and locations ===
Team	Location	Stadium	Capacity
Divjaka	Divjakë		
Djelmnia Shkodrane	Shkodër		
Internacionale Tirana FC	Tirana	National Sports Centre	50
Rubiku	Rubik		
Shkëndija Tiranë	Tirana	AFA Sports Centre	
Term	Tirana		
UKZKM	Tirana		

== League standings ==
Pos	Team	Pld	W	D	L	GF	GA	GD	Pts	Promotion
1	Rubiku (Note: Rubiku did not gain promotion, due to financial difficulties.) (C)	18	13	3	2	48	22	+26	42	
2	Term (P)	18	12	5	1	52	23	+29	41	Promotion to 2018–19 Kategoria e Dytë
3	Internacionale Tirana	18	9	5	4	41	28	+13	32	
4	Djelmnia Shkodrane	18	7	5	6	33	23	+10	26	
5	Divjaka	18	5	2	11	31	51	−20	17	
6	Shkëndija Tiranë	18	3	3	12	30	51	−21	12	
7	UKZKM	18	1	3	14	25	62	−37	6	

Rules for classification: 1) points; 2) goal difference; 3) number of goals scored; 4) head-to-head points; 5) head-to-head goal difference; 6) draw. (Head-to-head record is applied for clubs with the same number of points only once all matches between said clubs have been played.)
(C) Champions; (P) Promoted
