= 2020 Kategoria e Tretë =

Kategoria e Tretë
- Season: 2020
- Promoted: Bulqiza; Labëria
- Matches: 36
- Goals: 250 (6.94 per match)
- Biggest home win: Bulqiza 10−0 Pirust (4 March 2020)
- Biggest away win: Osumi 2−15 Bulqiza (26 June 2020)
- Highest scoring: Osumi 2−15 Bulqiza (26 June 2020)

The 2020 Kategoria e Tretë was the 17th official season of the Albanian football fourth division since its establishment. The season began on 20 February 2020 and ended on 17 July 2020. There were 8 teams competing this season. The competition was suspended from 12 March to 4 June 2020, due to a pandemic of COVID-19 in Albania. Bulqiza and Labëria gained promotion to the 2020–21 Kategoria e Dytë. Labëria won their first Kategoria e Tretë title.

== Changes from last season ==
=== Team changes ===
==== From Third Division ====
Promoted to Kategoria e Dytë:

- Mirdita
- Selenica
2020 Kategoria e Tretë teams.

=== Stadia by capacity and locations ===
Team	Location	Stadium	Capacity
Bulqiza	Bulqizë		
Divjaka	Divjakë		
Kinostudio	Tirana		
Labëria	Vlorë		
Osumi	Ura Vajgurore		
Pirust	Tirana		
Shkëndija Tiranë	Tirana	AFA Sports Centre	
Valbona	Bajram Curri		

== League standings ==
Pos	Team	Pld	W	D	L	GF	GA	GD	Pts	Promotion
1	Labëria (C, P)	12	10	2	0	46	12	+34	32	Promotion to 2020–21 Kategoria e Dytë
2	Bulqiza (P)	12	9	0	3	52	15	+37	27	Promotion to 2020–21 Kategoria e Dytë
3	Valbona (P)	12	6	3	3	43	26	+17	21	Promotion to 2020–21 Kategoria e Dytë
4	Kinostudio	12	5	2	5	30	24	+6	17	
5	Divjaka	12	4	3	5	30	24	+6	15	
6	Osumi	12	3	0	9	32	73	−41	9	
7	Pirust	12	0	0	12	17	76	−59	0	
8	Shkëndija Tiranë (Note: Shkëndija Tiranë withdrew from the competition after the 4th round.) (D)	0	0	0	0	0	0	0	0	Withdrew

Source: https://www.panorama.com.al/sport/bulqiza-luan-tenis-kinostudio-ia-del-ne-shtese/
Rules for classification: 1) points; 2) goal difference; 3) number of goals scored; 4) head-to-head points; 5) head-to-head goal difference; 6) draw. (Head-to-head record is applied for clubs with the same number of points only once all matches between said clubs have been played.)
(C) Champions; (D) Disqualified; (P) Promoted
