= Gersi Diamanti =

Albanian footballer

Personal information
- Date of birth: 15 October 1999 (age 27)
- Place of birth: Vlorë, Albania
- Position: Forward

Team information
- Current team: Flamurtari

Senior career*
Years	Team	Apps	(Gls)
2018–2022	Flamurtari	36+	(25)
2022–2023	Egnatia	2	(0)
2023–2024	Kastrioti	16	(2)
2024–	Flamurtari	13	(1)
- * Club domestic league appearances and goals as of 4 May 2024

Gersi Diamanti (born 15 October 1999) is an Albanian footballer who plays as a forward for Flamurtari.

== Career ==
=== Flamurtari ===
Diamanti made his league debut for the club on 17 March 2019, coming on as a 66th-minute substitute for Xhevahir Sukaj in a 0–0 draw with Laçi. Diamanti broke into the first team following the club's relegation to the Kategoria e Parë in 2020, making 19 first-team appearances and scoring eight goals. Diamanti returned to the team after they were relegated to the Kategoria e Dytë the following season, helping the team to promotion. He began the summer before the 2022–23 season with the team, but would transfer before the start of the campaign.

=== Egnatia ===
In August 2022, Diamanti joined Kategoria Superiore club Egnatia on a three-year deal.

== Career statistics ==
=== Club ===
As of 28 February 2023

Club	Season	League			National cup (Note: Appearance(s) in the Albanian Cup)		Other		Total	
Club	Season	Division	Apps	Goals	Apps	Goals	Apps	Goals	Apps	Goals
Flamurtari	2017–18	Kategoria Superiore	0	0	1	1	—		1	1
Flamurtari	2018–19	Kategoria Superiore	3	0	—		—		3	0
Flamurtari	2019–20	Kategoria Superiore	14	1	3	0	—		17	1
Flamurtari	2020–21	Kategoria e Parë	19	8	1	0	1 (Note: Appearance in the Kategoria e Parë relegation play-offs)	0	21	8
Flamurtari	2021–22	Kategoria e Dytë	?	16	6	3	—		6+	19
Flamurtari	Total		36+	25	11	4	1	0	48+	29
Egnatia	2022–23	Kategoria Superiore	0	0	—		—		0	0
Career total			36+	25	11	4	1	0	48+	29
