= KF Tirana league record by opponent =

== Championship Performance Table ==
Here is a list of all of KF Tirana's seasons from 1930 till most recent season. This list shows where they finished the season, how many goals they scored and conceded, how many wins draws and losses they had throughout the season, goal difference, winning difference, earned points and matches played. The list below also displays the results from three Second World War championships along period 1939-1942, however, these championships are not officially recognized from AFA.

Season	Ranking	Goals	Wins	Draws	Losses	+/-Goals	+/- Wins	Points	Matches
1930	Winners	21- 7	7	4	1	+14	+ 6	18	12
1931	Winners	10- 3	3	2	1	+ 7	+ 2	8	6
1932	Winners	29- 6	5	3	0	+23	+ 5	13	8
1933	3rd	14-12	3	2	3	+ 2	-	8	8
1934	Winners	54- 8	10	1	1	+46	+ 9	21	12
1936	Winners	50- 8	11	3	0	+42	+11	25	14
1937	Winners	74- 8	17	1	0	+66	+17	35	18
1939*	Winners	18- 5	4	0	0	+13	+ 4	8	4
1940*	3rd	12-10	3	1	2	+ 2	+ 1	7	6
1942*	Winners	13- 6	3	3	0	+ 7	+ 3	9	6
1945	Runners-up	32-10	7	2	3	+22	+ 4	16	12
1946	3rd	26- 7	8	0	2	+19	+ 6	16	10
1947	4	26-51	5	4	7	-25	1	14	16
1948	6	9- 9	4	2	3	-	+ 1	10	9
1949	4	25-19	7	2	7	+ 6	-	16	16
1950	9	34-24	6	2	8	+10	2	14	16
1951	3rd	61-45	16	3	7	+16	+ 9	35	26
1952	5	54-19	12	2	6	+35	+ 6	26	20
1953	3rd	47-16	14	1	3	+31	+11	29	18
1954	3rd	47-21	14	3	5	+26	+ 9	31	22
1955	3rd	50-35	16	5	9	+15	+ 7	37	30
1956	3rd	24-19	7	3	6	+ 5	+ 1	17	16
1957	4	22-17	5	6	3	+ 5	+ 2	16	14
1958	3rd	15- 9	4	9	1	+ 6	+ 3	17	14
1959	Runners-up	20-11	8	3	3	+ 9	+ 5	19	14
1960	3rd	22-17	8	4	6	+ 5	+ 2	20	18
1961	3rd	27-18	9	5	4	+ 9	+ 5	23	18
1962-63	4	33-28	7	10	5	+ 5	+ 2	24	22
1963-64	6	32-21	8	9	5	+11	+ 3	25	22
1964-65	Winners	42-20	13	5	4	+22	+ 9	31	22
1965-66	Winners	55-15	19	2	2	+40	+17	40	23
1966-67	Runners-up	42-23	15	3	4	+19	+11	33	22
1968	Winners	63-20	21	3	2	+43	+19	45	26
1969-70	Winners	56-10	19	6	1	+46	+18	44	26
1970-71	7	32-21	9	9	8	+11	+ 1	27	26
1971-72	Runners-up	44-23	14	9	3	+19	+11	37	26
1972-73	11	23-30	8	5	13	7	5	21	26
1973-74	13	23-28	8	8	12	5	4	24	28
1974-75	4	30-17	9	15	2	+13	+ 7	33	26
1975-76	Runners-up	29-18	8	10	4	+11	+ 4	26	22
1976-77	5	31-31	14	5	13	-	+ 1	33	32
1977-78	6	21-20	7	7	8	+ 1	1	21	22
1978-79	Runners-up	41-27	13	9	4	+14	+ 9	35	26
1979-80	Runners-up	33-27	11	10	5	+ 6	+ 6	32	26
1980-81	3rd	38-21	14	7	5	+17	+ 9	35	26
1981-82	Winners	42-15	15	7	4	+27	+11	37	26
1982-83	3rd	38-26	12	8	6	+12	+ 6	32	26
1983-84	Runners-up	34-18	10	14	2	+16	+ 8	34	26
1984-85	Winners	45-22	15	9	2	+23	+13	39	26
1985-86	3rd	57-29	16	5	5	+28	+11	37	26
1986-87	6	43-29	9	10	7	+14	+ 2	28	26
1987-88	Winners	59-29	18	12	6	+30	+12	48	36
1988-89	Winners	58-25	21	6	5	+33	+16	48	32
1989-90	4	40-34	13	8	12	+ 6	+ 1	36	33
1990-91	4	52-40	16	12	11	+12	+ 5	44	39
1991-92	8	38-32	11	6	13	+ 6	2	28	30
1992-93	11	24-28	7	13	10	4	3	27	30
1993-94	Runners-up	36-16	13	7	6	+20	+ 7	33	26
1994-95	Winners	57-27	19	6	5	+30	+14	44	30
1995-96	Winners	52-22	19	10	5	+30	+14	55	34
1996-97	Winners	40- 9	14	4	4	+31	+10	46	22
1997-98	Runners-up	54-19	19	8	7	+35	+12	65	34
1998-99	Winners	48-20	18	7	5	+28	+13	61	30
1999-00	Winners	41-15	16	5	6	+26	+10	53	27
2000-01	Runners-up	56-13	16	6	4	+43	+12	54	26
2001-02	Runners-up	52-15	19	5	2	+37	+17	62	26
2002-03	Winners	57-18	19	3	4	+39	+15	60	26
2003-04	Winners	90-36	24	8	4	+54	+20	80	36
2004-05	Winners	82-32	26	6	4	+50	+22	84	36
2005-06	Runners-up	54-33	17	11	8	+21	+ 9	62	36
2006-07	Winners	64-33	22	6	5	+31	+17	72	33
2007-08	6	46-36	14	7	12	+10	+ 2	49	33
2008-09	Winners	58-27	19	11	3	+31	+16	68	33
2009-10	3rd	38-32	15	7	11	+6	+ 4	52	33
2010-11	5	42-31	11	11	11	+11	-	44	33
2011-12	3rd	33-21	16	5	5	+12	+11	53	26
2012-13	5	30-23	12	7	7	+7	+5	43	26
2013-14	6	36-31	14	8	11	+5	+3	50	33
2014-15	4	47-27	21	8	7	+20	+14	71	36
2015-16	5	37-25	13	14	9	+12	+4	53	36
2016-17	9	29-32	8	15	13	-3	-3	39	36
2017-18	Relegated	-	-	-	-	-	-	-	-
2018-19	7	44-35	12	11	13	̟+9	-1	47	36
2019-20	Winners	67-35	21	7	8	+32	+13	70	36
2020-21	5	41-26	15	13	8	+15	+7	58	36
2021-22	Winners	64-27	22	7	7	+37	+15	73	36
2022-23	Runners-up	56-33	20	7	9	+23	+11	67	36
TOTAL		3438-1873	1079	543	474	+1565	+605	3132	2096

- Results from 1939, 1940 & 1942 Superliga seasons are not officially recognized from AFA.

== Winning squads ==
- 1930:

 Rudolf Gurashi, Abdullah Shehri, Irfan Gjinali, Xhelal Kashari, Vasil Kajano,
 Gjon Sabati, Llazar Miha, Mark Gurashi, Bexhet Jolldashi, Shefqet Ndroqi,
 Isuf Dashi, Selman Stermasi, Adem Karapici, Hysen Kusi, Mustafa Begolli,
 Hilmi Kosova, Emil Hajnali, Rexhep Maci. Coach: Selman Stermasi

- 1931:

 Rudolf Gurashi, Vasfi Samimi, Abdullah Sherri, Sabit Coku, Vasil Kajano,
 Bexhet Jolldashi, Irfan Gjinali, Muhamet Agolli, Gjon Sabati, Adem Karapici,
 Isuf Dashi, Hysen Kusi, Hilmi Kosova, Mark Gurashi, Halim Begeja, Emil
 Hajnali, Llazar Miha, Selman Stermasi. Coach: Selman Stermasi

- 1932:

 Abdullah Shehri, Bexhet Jolldashi, Muhamet Agolli, Vasil Kajani, Rifat
 Jolldashi, Hyse Kusi, Adem Karapici, Hasan Maluci, Halim Begeja, Selman
 Stermasi, Emil Hajnali, Isuf Dashi, Haki Korca, Hajri Jegeni, Gjon Sabati.
 Coach: Selman Stermasi

- 1934:

 Rudolf Gurashi, Sabit Coku, Foto Janku, Hasan Maluci, Ludovik Jakova,
 Hamit Keci, Adem Karapici, Selman Stermasi, Riza Lushta, Maliq Petrela,
 Halim Begeja, Haki Korca, Luci Stamati, Mark Gurashi. Coach: Selman Stermasi

- 1936:

 Rudolf Gurashi, Qamil Zebishti, Asti Hobdari, Foto Janku, Sabit Coku,
 Ramazan Hima, Hysen Kusi, Adem Karapici, Ludovik Jakova, Luci Stamati,
 Myslym Alla, Hot Mirdita, Riza Lushta, Maliq Petrela, Emil Hajnali,
 Mark Gurashi, Skender Gjinali. Coach: Selman Stermasi

- 1937:

 Rudolf Gurashi, Qamil Zebishti, Prokop Skuka, Foto Janku, Sllave Llambi,
 Adem Karapici, Mico Plluska, Ludovik Jakova, Hasan Balla, Hot Mirdita,
 Riza Lushta, Mark Gurashi, Emil Hajnali, Ramiz Kashariqi, Maliq Petrela,
 Zyber Lisi, Myslym Alla. Coach: Selman Stermasi

- 1964-65:

 Nuri Bylyku, Rexhep Bathorja, Luigj Bytyci, Skender Halili, Gezim Kasmi,
 Fatmir Frasheri, Niko Xhacka, Skender Hya, Pavllo Bukoviku, Bahri Ishka,
 Ali Mema, Bujar Tafaj, Ilir Elini, Gezim Saraci, Osman Mema, Vaso Konomi,
 Tomorr Gjoka, Aurel Verria. Coach: Myslym Alla

- 1965-66:

 Josif Kazanxhi, Bahri Ishka, Ilir Elini, Bujar Tafaj, Fatmir Frasheri,
 Skender Halili, Gezim Kasmi, Nuri Bylyku, Ali Mema, Luigj Bytyci, Niko
 Xhacka, Tomorr Gjoka, Pavllo Bukoviku, Rexhep Bathorja, Skender Hyka,
 Gezim Saraci, Osman Mema, Vaso Konomi, Aurel Verria. Coach: Myslym Alla

- 1968:

 Bujar Tafaj, Shpetim Habibi, Fatmir Frasheri, Perikli Dhales, Osman Mema,
 Ali Mema, Luigj Bytyci, Niko Xhacka, Pavllo Bukoviku, Josif Kazanxhi,
 Skender Hyka, Bahri Ishka, Petraq Ikonomi, Arben Cela, Petrit Nurishmi,
 Tomorr Gjoka, Gezim Kasmi. Coach: Myslym Alla

- 1969-70:

 Bujar Tafaj, Bahri Ishka, Perikli Dhales, Pavllo Bukoviku, Josif Kazanxhi,
 Ali Mema, Petrit Nurishmi, Petraq Ikonomi, Gezim Kasmi, Arben Cela,
 Skender Hyka, Fatmir Frasheri, Niko Xhacka, Durim Hatibi, Luigj Bytyci,
 Osman Mema, Lulzim Shala, Tomorr Gjoka. Coach: Myslym Alla

- 1981-82:

 Shkelqim Muca, Bujar Muca, Gjergj Dinella, Besnik Armadhi, Ilir Metani,
 Arben Vila, Luan Sengla, Bujar Vladi, Arjan Bimo, Bedri Omuri, Adnan
 Demneri, Antonin Naci, Millan Baci, Agustin Kola, Leonard Liti, Sulejman
 Mema. Coach: Enver Shehu

- 1984-85:

 Mirel Josa, Arben Minga, Millan Baci, Sulejman Mema, Astrit Ramadani,
 Anesti Stoja, Halim Mersini, Agustin Kola, Petrit Roga, Skender Hodja,
 Artur Lekbello, Bedri Omuri, Shkelqim Muca, Arjan Bimo, Leonard Liti,
 Artan Bylyku. Coach: Enver Shehu

- 1987-88:

 Halim Mersini, Bujar Sharra, Fatos Daja, Skender Hodja, Artur Lekbello,
 Krenar Alimehmeti, Fatjon Kepi, Ardian Ruci, Bedri Omuri, Mirel Josa,
 Anesti Stoja, Shkelqim Muca, Arben Minga, Astrit Ramadani, Artan Sako,
 Florian Riza, Agustin Kola, Sinan Bardhi, Leonard Liti, Albert Fortuzi,
 Fatbardh Ismali, David Papadhopulli. Coach: Shyqyri Rreli

- 1988-89:

 Halim Mersini, Bujar Sharra, Astrit Ramadani, Skender Hodja, Artur Lekbello,
 Krenar Alimehmeti, Sinan Bardhi, Leonard Liti, Bedri Omuri, Mirel Josa,
 Anesti Stoja, Shkelqim Muca, Arben Minga, Agustin Kola, Florian Riza,
 Artan Sako, Fatos Daja, Ardian Ruci, Fatbardh Ismaili, Fatjon Kepi, Shkelqim
 Lekbello, Renis Hyka, Artan Luzi, Ardian Mema. Coach: Shyqyri Rreli

- 1994-95:

 Auron Miloti, Indrit Fortuzi, Erion Kasmi, Thoma Kokuri, Saimir Malko,
 Alpin Gallo, Nevil Dede, Afrim Tole, Anesti Stoja, Ardian Mema, Dritan
 Baholli, Artan Kukli, Edmond Sula, Sokol Prenga, Amarildo Zela, Klorend
 Fejzolli, Arben Minga, Agustin Kola, Endi Hyka, Frenkli Dhales, Blendi
 Nallbani, Eldorado Merkoci, Lulian Mulleti. Coach: Shkelqim Muca

- 1995-96:

 Auron Miloti, Nordik Ruhi, Saimir Malko, Alpin Gallo, Arben Minga, Krenar
 Alimehmeti, Ardian Mema, Artan Kukli, Blendi Nallbani, Eriton Kasmi,
 Florian Riza, Sokol Bulku, Eldorado Merkoci, Nevil Dede, Edmond Sula,
 Endi Hyka, Nikolin Coclli, Alban Bushi, Elvin Cassli, Indrit Fortuzi,
 Devis Ismaili, Agustin Kola, Skender Mergjyshi, Lulian Mulleti, Taulant
 Stermasi. Coach: Sulejman Mema

- 1996-97:

 Auron Miloti, Blendi Nallbani, Lulzim Hushi, Alpin Gallo, Nevil Dede,
 Krenar Alimehmeti, Ardian Mema, Artan Kukli, Alvaro Zalla, Florian Riza,
 Nikolin Coclli, Eldorado Merkoci, Agustin Kola, Sokol Bulku, Indrit Fortuzi,
 Devis Ismaili, Sparti Domi, Taulant Stermasi, Nordik Ruhi, Rigels Kapllani,
 Eriton Kasmi, Alban Bushi, Elton Shaba, Elvis Sina. Coach: Enver Shehu

- 1998-99:

 Ardian Mema, Nikolin Coclli, Klodian Duro, Saimir Malko, Devi Muka, Alket
 Zeqo, Alpin Gallo, Blendi Nallbani, Krenar Alimehmeti, Alban Tafaj,
 Eldorado Merkoci, Sokol Prenga, Nevil Dede, Rezart Dabulla, Elvis Sina,
 Sokol Ishka, Ervin Bulku, Sokol Bulu, Isli Hidi, Taulant Stermasi, Oltion
 Osmani, Marian Liti, Agron Xhafa, Saimir Iljazi, Ervin Karaj, Rezart Karaj,
 Nordik Ruhi, Devis Ismaili. Coach: Sulejman Mema

- 1999-00:

 Blendi Nallbani, Elvis Sina, Rezart Dabulla, Nevil Dede, Krenar Alimehmeti,
 Alban Tafaj, Ervin Bulku, Enkli Memishi, Zoltan Kenesei (HUN), Johan Driza,
 Anesti Vito, Peter Sutori (HUN), Erion Rizvanolli, Florian Riza, Isli Hidi,
 Sokol Bulku, Alpin Gallo, Sokol Ishka, Julian Kapaj, Gentian Lici, Ardian
 Mema, Sokol Prenga, Nordik Ruhi, Fatjon Ymeri, Laszlo Vukovics (HUN), Matyas
 Lazar (HUN). Coach: Shkelqim Muca

- 2002-03:

 Emmanuel Ndubuisi Egbo, Isli Hidi, Glend Tafaj, Alban Tafaj, Nevil Dede,
 Elvis Sina, Rezart Dabulla, Gentian Hajdari, Rudi Vata, Jan Veenhof,
 Suad Lici, Ansi Agolli, Florian Manastirliu, Sajmir Patushi, Fjodor Xhafa,
 Ardian Mema, Ervin Bulku, Sokol Bulku, Erald Begolli, Redi Jupi, Daniele
 Zaccanti, Devi Muka, Arian Veraj, Sokol Prenga, Indrit Fortuzi, Eldorado
 Merkoci, Mahir Halili. Coach: Fatmir Frasheri

- 2003-04:

 Emmanuel Egbo, Isli Hidi, Gentian Tafaj, Alban Tafaj, Nevil Dede, Elvis
 Sina, Rezart Dabulla, Gentian Hajdari, Luan Pinari, Alban Muca, Suad Lici,
 Ansi Agolli, Saimir Patushi, Sokol Bulku, Devi Muka, Indrit Fortuzi,
 Mahir Halili, Eldorado Merkoci, Fjodor Xhafa. Coach: Mirel Josa

- 2004-05:

 Blendi Nallbani, Elvis Sina, Alban Tafaj, Ervin Bulku,
 Altin Rraklli, Eldorado Merkoçi, Devi Muka, Ansi Agolli, Gentian Hajdari,
 Egert Bakalli, Fjodor Xhafa, Saimir Patushi,
 Geri Çipi, Isli Hidi, Rezart Dabulla, Ervin Fakaj, Ardit Beqiri, Ardian Behari. Coach: Sulejman Starova

- 2006-07:

 Isli Hidi, Elvis Sina, Orjand Abazaj, Nevil Dede, Errand Xhafa,
 Endrit Vrapi, Devi Muka, Hetlem Çapja, Jetmir Sefa, Egert Bakalli,
 Jahmir Hyka, Klodian Duro, Daniel Xhafaj, Indrit Fortuzi
 Blendi Nallbani, Gentian Hajdari, Erald Deliallisi, Florenc Arapi, Eldorado Merkoçi. Coach: Sulejman Starova

- 2008-09:

 Blendi Nallbani, Abraham Alechenwu, Bledar Devolli, Rezart Dabulla,
 Tefik Osmani, Entonio Pashaj, Laurent Mohellebi, Jetmir Sefa, Arbër Abilaliaj,
 Blerti Hajdari, Sabien Lilaj, Andi Lila, Pece Korunovski,
 Migen Metani, Gerard Tusha, Nertil Ferraj, Devi Muka. Coach: Alban Tafaj

- 2019–20:

 Ilion Lika, Marsel Ismailgeci, Tefik Osmani, Andi Lila,
 Albi Doka, Kristi Vangjeli, Gentian Muça, Elton Calé, Winful Cobbinah,
 Jurgen Çelhaka, Erjon Hoxhallari, Edon Hasani, Agustin Torassa, Erando Karabeci, Ismael Dunga,
 Ernest Muçi, Mario Morina, Grent Halili, Michael Ngoo, Idriz Batha. Coach: Emmanuel Egbo

- 2021-22:

 Ilion Lika, Kristijan Toshevski, Gentian Muça, Filip Najdovski, Enes Kuka, Engjëll Hoti, Ennur Totre, 
 Michael Ngoo, Vesel Limaj, Arbër Bytyqi, Marsel Ismailgeci, Aldi Gjumsi, Florjan Përgjoni, Redon Xhixha,
 Jocelin Behiratche, Erion Hoxhallari, Marlind Nuriu, Devid de Silva, Mario Beshiraj, 
 Dijar Nikqi, Realf Zhivanaj, Ardit Toli, Visar Bekaj, Taulant Seferi. Coach: Orges Shehi

== Head-to-head stats ==
Below are head-to-head results of KF Tirana versus 44 opponents participated in Albanian Superliga from 1930 till present.

Opponent	Goals	Wins	Draws	Losses	+/-Goals	Matches
Partizani (D1)	183-231	45	52	68	-48	165
Dinamo Tirana (D2)	212-180	60	34	46	+32	140
KS Vllaznia (Do)	265-213	90	47	56	+52	193
KS Flamurtari	239-145	81	39	43	+94	163
KS Teuta	275-150	88	54	43	+125	185
KS Elbasani	263-128	74	37	32	+135	143
KS Besa	222-121	73	43	20	+101	136
KF Skënderbeu Korçë	240-144	71	49	37	+96	157
KS Tomori	142-50	53	19	11	+92	83
KS Lushnja	153-67	48	26	14	+86	88
Luftëtari	166-55	51	19	12	+111	82
KS Apolonia	180-52	63	10	14	+128	87
Besëlidhja	83-30	29	13	7	+53	49
Naftëtari	70-19	19	7	2	+51	28
KF Laçi	80-40	30	14	16	+40	60
KS Shkumbini	91-37	34	10	6	+54	50
KS Kastrioti	63-29	20	14	6	+34	40
KS Bylis	60-21	20	13	6	+39	39
KS Albpetrol	38- 9	10	1	2	+29	13
KF Sopoti	13- 2	5	4	0	+11	9
KS Burreli	18- 2	5	3	0	+16	8
KS Pogradeci	70-12	17	2	1	+59	20
Erzeni	44- 6	9	0	1	+38	10
KS Shkëndija	31-12	13	5	2	+19	20
KS Kamza	9- 3	3	2	1	+6	6
FK Kukësi	38-46	9	7	16	8	32
Gramozi	3- 1	2	1	0	+2	3
Luftëtari Shk.Bashkuar	17- 3	6	2	0	+14	8
Komb.Tekstile	8- 1	3	1	0	+ 7	4
Spartak Tirana	15- 3	4	2	0	+12	6
Spartak Shkodër	10- 1	2	0	0	+ 9	2
Dinamo Shkodër	4- 7	1	0	1	3	2
Dinamo Durrës	14- 3	3	2	1	+11	6
KS Selenicë	7- 4	1	0	1	+ 3	2
KS Iliria	7- 1	2	0	0	+ 6	2
Dinamo Vlorë	14- 2	4	0	0	+12	4
KS Korabi	11- 3	3	3	0	+ 8	6
KS Studenti	7- 0	2	0	0	+ 7	2
KF Përmeti	9- 1	2	0	0	+ 8	2
Ylli Shkodër	6- 2	1	1	0	+ 4	2
KF Tërbuni Pukë	11- 2	4	0	0	+ 9	4
KF Egnatia	17- 3	7	1	0	+14	8
Liria Korcë	-	-	-	-	-	-
Spartak Korcë	-	-	-	-	-	-

- Data correct until 14.05.2022 (34th Rnd)

== Home & Away ==
=== Vllaznia ===
Competition	Played	KF Tirana	Draw	Vllaznia	KF Tirana Goals	Vllaznia Goals
Overall	193	90	47	56	265	213
Tirana	99	51	23	25	152	107
Shkodër	94	39	24	31	113	106

=== Flamurtari ===
Competition	Played	KF Tirana	Draw	Flamurtari	KF Tirana Goals	Flamurtari Goals
Overall	163	81	39	43	239	145
Tirana	81	50	22	9	146	53
Vlorë	82	31	17	34	93	92

=== Teuta ===
Competition	Played	KF Tirana	Draw	Teuta	KF Tirana Goals	Teuta Goals
Overall	185	88	54	43	275	150
Tirana	93	62	21	10	175	55
Durrës	92	26	33	33	100	95

=== Elbasani ===
Competition	Played	KF Tirana	Draw	Elbasani	KF Tirana Goals	Elbasani Goals
Overall	143	74	37	32	263	128
Tirana	75	55	12	8	171	53
Elbasan	68	19	25	24	92	75

=== Besa ===
Competition	Played	KF Tirana	Draw	Besa	KF Tirana Goals	Besa Goals
Overall	136	73	43	20	222	121
Tirana	66	44	20	2	123	34
Kavajë	70	29	23	18	99	87

=== Skënderbeu ===
Competition	Played	KF Tirana	Draw	Skënderbeu	KF Tirana Goals	Skënderbeu Goals
Overall	157	71	49	37	240	144
Tirana	79	46	24	9	149	55
Korcë	78	25	25	28	91	90

=== Shkumbini ===
Competition	Played	KF Tirana	Draw	Shkumbini	KF Tirana Goals	Shkumbini Goals
Overall	49	34	9	6	91	37
Tirana	24	20	4	0	62	21
Peqin	25	14	5	6	29	16

=== Apolonia ===
Competition	Played	KF Tirana	Draw	Apolonia	KF Tirana Goals	Apolonia Goals
Overall	87	63	10	14	180	52
Tirana	42	38	2	2	113	15
Fier	45	25	8	12	67	37

=== Tomori ===
Competition	Played	KF Tirana	Draw	Tomori	KF Tirana Goals	Tomori Goals
Overall	83	53	19	11	142	50
Tirana	41	34	7	0	96	21
Berat	42	19	12	11	46	29

=== Lushnja ===
Competition	Played	KF Tirana	Draw	Lushnja	KF Tirana Goals	Tomori Goals
Overall	88	48	26	14	153	67
Tirana	45	33	6	6	104	29
Lushnjë	43	15	20	8	49	38

=== Laçi ===
Competition	Played	KF Tirana	Draw	Laçi	KF Tirana Goals	Laçi Goals
Overall	60	30	14	16	80	40
Tirana	31	20	7	4	45	10
Laç	29	10	7	12	35	30

=== Luftëtari ===
Competition	Played	KF Tirana	Draw	Luftëtari	KF Tirana Goals	Luftëtari Goals
Overall	82	51	19	12	166	55
Tirana	44	33	8	3	108	27
Gjirokastër	38	18	11	9	58	28

=== Kastrioti ===
Competition	Played	KF Tirana	Draw	Kastrioti	KF Tirana Goals	Kastrioti Goals
Overall	40	20	14	6	63	29
Tirana	19	11	6	2	34	10
Krujë	21	9	8	4	29	19

=== Naftëtari ===
Competition	Played	KF Tirana	Draw	Naftëtari	KF Tirana Goals	Naftëtari Goals
Overall	28	19	7	2	70	19
Tirana	14	12	2	0	47	10
Kuçovë	14	7	5	2	23	9

=== Bylis ===
Competition	Played	KF Tirana	Draw	Bylis	KF Tirana Goals	Bylis Goals
Overall	39	20	13	6	60	21
Tirana	20	15	4	1	45	11
Ballsh	19	5	9	5	15	10

=== Besëlidhja ===
Competition	Played	KF Tirana	Draw	Besëlidhja	KF Tirana Goals	Besëlidhja Goals
Overall	49	29	13	7	83	30
Tirana	22	18	2	2	56	13
Lezhë	27	11	11	5	27	17

=== Pogradeci ===
Competition	Played	KF Tirana	Draw	Pogradeci	KF Tirana Goals	Pogradeci Goals
Overall	20	17	2	1	70	12
Tirana	10	8	1	1	36	8
Pogradec	10	9	1	0	34	4

== Recent Seasons ==
Opponent	Wins	Draws	Losses	Goals	+/-Goals	Matches	WH	DH	LH	GH	WA	DA	LA	GA
Partizani	17	18	17	60-56	+ 4	52	11	8	6	32-21	6	10	11	28-35
Dinamo Tirana	17	8	7	54-36	+18	32	9	4	4	29-17	8	4	3	25-19
KS Vllaznia	30	18	10	80-51	+29	58	17	10	4	47-24	13	8	6	33-26
KS Flamurtari	23	9	14	68-44	+24	46	15	4	3	39-18	8	5	11	29-26
KS Teuta	26	22	14	81-50	+31	62	15	9	8	47-27	11	13	6	34-23
KS Elbasani	12	10	6	51-32	+19	28	8	5	2	30-13	4	5	4	21-19
KS Besa	11	10	7	48-30	+18	28	5	6	1	24-8	6	4	6	24-22
KF Skënderbeu Korçë	18	13	17	63-53	+10	47	14	6	4	39-19	4	7	13	24-34
KS Lushnja	13	4	1	31-7	+24	18	9	1	0	16-3	4	3	1	15-4
KS Apolonia	17	2	1	39-7	+32	20	9	0	0	22-2	8	2	1	17-5
KF Laçi	23	9	13	57-29	+28	45	15	5	4	33-9	8	4	9	24-20
KS Shkumbini	20	6	5	55-27	+28	31	11	4	0	34-13	9	2	5	21-14
KS Kastrioti	16	9	6	49-25	+24	31	8	4	2	24-7	8	5	4	24-16
KS Bylis	13	9	4	33-17	+16	26	9	3	1	21-10	4	6	3	10-7
KS Luftetari	12	2	3	36-11	+25	16	8	1	0	21-4	4	1	3	15-7
KF Egnatia	7	1	0	17-3	+14	7	3	1	0	9-3	4	0	0	8-0
KS Besëlidhja	1	0	2	2-2	-	3	0	0	1	0-1	1	0	1	2-1
KS Tomori	4	0	0	4-0	+4	4	2	0	0	2-0	2	0	0	2-0
KS Gramozi Ersekë	2	1	0	3-1	+2	3	1	1	0	2-1	1	0	0	1-0
KS Kamza	3	2	1	9-3	+6	6	2	0	1	5-2	1	2	0	4-1
KS Pogradeci	2	0	0	5-2	+3	2	1	0	0	3-1	1	0	0	2-1
KS Kukësi	9	7	16	38-46	-8	32	6	3	7	24-21	3	4	9	14-25
KF Tërbuni Pukë	4	0	0	11-2	+ 9	4	2	0	0	6-0	2	0	0	5-2
TOTAL	300	161	142	898-535	+363	603	181	74	48	518-226	118	87	95	380-309

WH = Home wins

DH = Home draws

LH = Home losses

GH = Home goals

WA = Away wins

DA = Away draws

LA = Away losses

GA =- Away goals

- Data correct until 14.05.2022 (34th Rnd)

== Biggest league wins ==
- KF Tirana-KS Elbasani 6-0 (01.05.1932) KS Elbasani-KF Tirana 2-9 (12.06.1932) KF Tirana-KS Elbasani 9-0 (17.06.1934) KF Tirana-KS Elbasani 9-0 (17.06.1952) KF Tirana-KS Elbasani 8-1 (1968) KF Tirana-KS Elbasani 6-1 (15.04.2011)
- KF Tirana-KS Teuta 9-0 (15.04.1934) KF Tirana-KS Teuta 8-0 (16.05.1937) KF Tirana-KS Teuta 5-0 (2007)
- KF Tirana-KS Flamurtari 8-0 (29.04.1934) KF Tirana-KS Flamurtari 11-0 (05.07.1936)
- KF Tirana-KS Besëlidhja 11-0 (06.06.1937)
- KF Tirana-KS Pogradeci 8-0 (24.10.1937) KF Tirana-KS Pogradeci 9-2 (1950) KS Pogradeci-KF Tirana 0-6 (1950) KS Pogradeci-KF Tirana 1-8 (1953)
- Naftëtari-KF Tirana 0-6 (1951) KF Tirana-Naftëtari 6-0 (1970) KF Tirana-Naftëtari 6-0 (1987)
- Dinamo Vlorë-KF Tirana 0-6 (1952
- Luftëtari-KF Tirana 0-6 (1945) KF Tirana-Luftëtari 7-1 (1951) KF Luftëtari-KF Tirana 0-5 (07.06.2020)
- Erzeni-KF Tirana 0-6 (1952) KF Tirana-Erzeni 11-0 (1966)
- KF Spartak Tirana-KF Tirana 0-6 (1957)
- KF Tirana-KS Lushnja 7-1 (1962) KF Tirana-KS Lushnja 7-0 (1988) KF Tirana-KS Lushnja 7-1 (2001) KS Lushnja-KF Tirana 0-6 (2004)
- KF Tirana-Partizani 7-3 (1985)
- KF Tirana-KS Albpetrol 8-0 (1998)
- KF Tirana-KS Apolonia 6-0 (1986) KF Tirana-KS Apolonia 7-0 (2000)
- KF Tirana-KF Bylis 6-0 (2002) KF Tirana-KF Bylis 6-2 (2009)
- KF Tirana-KS Besa 7-1 (2004)
- KF Tirana-KF Laci 6-0 (2005)
- KF Tirana-KS Kastrioti 7-3 (2007)

== Biggest league defeats ==
- Partizani-KF Tirana 8-0 (1947) Partizani-KF Tirana 6-0 (1950) Partizani-KF Tirana 6-0 (1951)
- KF Tirana-KS Vllaznia 0-6 (1947) KS Vllaznia-KF Tirana 6-0 (1947)
- KF Tirana-KS Skenderbeu Korce 0-6 (1947)
- Dinamo Tirana-KF Tirana 6-0 (1951)
- Dinamo Shkodër-KF Tirana 6-0 (1955)
- KS Besa-KF Tirana 7-1 (1992)
- KS Lushnja-KF Tirana 6-1 (1998)

== See also ==
- KF Tirana Statistics in Albanian Cup
