= 2021–22 Kategoria e Dytë =

Kategoria e Dytë
- Season: 2021–22
- Champions: Flamurtari; 1st title
- Promoted: Luzi 2008; Oriku; Flamurtari
- Relegated: Klosi; Internacional; Gramozi; Përmeti; Këlcyra
- Matches: 264
- Goals: 855 (3.24 per match)
- Top goalscorer: Ervis Kongjini (26 goals)
- Biggest home win: Oriku 8−0 Gramshi (23 April 2022); Oriku 8−0 Internacional (6 November 2021)
- Biggest away win: Bulqiza 0−15 Veleçiku (23 April 2022)
- Highest scoring: Internacional 1−15 Luzi 2008 (16 April 2022)
- Longest winning run: 17 matches Flamurtari
- Longest unbeaten run: 22 matches Flamurtari
- Longest winless run: 18 matches Internacional
- Longest losing run: 18 matches Internacional

The 2021-22 Kategoria e Dytë was the 52nd official season of the Albanian football third division since its establishment. There were 24 teams competing this season, split in 2 groups. The winners of the groups played the league's final against each other and also gained promotion to the 2022–23 Kategoria e Parë. Teams ranked from the 2nd to the 5th position qualified to the play-off round which they played against the 11th and 12th ranked teams in the 2021–22 Kategoria e Parë. Flamurtari, Luzi 2008 and Oriku were promoted to the 2022–23 Kategoria e Parë. Flamurtari won their first Kategoria e Dytë title after beating Luzi 2008 in the final match.

== Changes from last season ==
=== Team changes ===
==== From Kategoria e Dytë ====
Promoted to Kategoria e Parë:

- Butrinti
- Maliqi
- Shkumbini
- Tërbuni

Relegated to Kategoria e Tretë:

- Delvina
- Skrapari
- Valbona

==== To Kategoria e Dytë ====
Relegated from Kategoria e Parë:

- Elbasani
- Flamurtari
- Oriku
- Veleçiku

Promoted from Kategoria e Tretë:

- Luftëtari
- Murlani

=== Locations ===
2021–22 Group A Kategoria e Dytë teams.
2021–22 Group B Kategoria e Dytë teams.

=== Stadia by capacity and locations ===
==== Group A ====
| Team | Location | Stadium | Capacity |
|---|---|---|---|
| Ada | Velipojë | Adriatik Velipojë | 1,200 |
| Bulqiza | Bulqizë | National Sports Centre | 50 |
| Elbasani | Elbasan | Internacional Complex | 1,000 |
| Gramshi | Gramsh | Mislim Koçi Stadium | 1,500 |
| Iliria | Fushë-Krujë | Redi Maloku Stadium | 3,000 |
| Internacional Tirana | Tirana | Internacional Complex | 1,000 |
| Klosi | Klos | Various | |
| Luzi 2008 | Luz i Vogël | Luz i Vogël Stadium | 600 |
| Murlani | Vau i Dejës | Barbullush Stadium | |
| Oriku | Orikum | Orikum Stadium | |
| Shënkolli | Shënkoll | Shënkoll Stadium | 500 |
| Veleçiku | Koplik | Kompleksi Vellezërit Duli | 2,000 |

==== Group B ====
| Team | Location | Stadium | Capacity |
|---|---|---|---|
| Albpetrol | Patos | Alush Noga Stadium | 2,150 |
| Devolli | Bilisht | Bilisht Stadium | 3,000 |
| Flamurtari | Vlorë | Flamurtari Stadium | 8,200 |
| Gramozi | Ersekë | Ersekë Stadium | 2,000 |
| Këlcyra | Këlcyrë | Këlcyrë Stadium | 1,000 |
| Labëria | Vlorë | Labëria Complex | |
| Luftëtari | Gjirokastër | Gjirokastra Stadium | 8,400 |
| Memaliaj | Memaliaj | Karafil Çaushi Stadium | 1,500 |
| Naftëtari | Kuçovë | Bashkim Sulejmani Stadium | 5,000 |
| Përmeti | Përmet | Durim Qypi Stadium | 4,000 |
| Sopoti | Librazhd | Sopoti Stadium | 3,000 |
| Tepelena | Tepelenë | Sabaudin Shehu Stadium | 2,000 |

== League standings ==
=== Group A ===
| Pos | Team | Pld | W | D | L | GF | GA | GD | Pts | Promotion or relegation |
|---|---|---|---|---|---|---|---|---|---|---|
| 1 | Luzi 2008 (P) | 22 | 16 | 5 | 1 | 67 | 13 | +54 | 53 | Promotion to 2022–23 Kategoria e Parë |
| 2 | Oriku (O, P) | 22 | 17 | 2 | 3 | 61 | 11 | +50 | 53 | Play-off promotion to 2022–23 Kategoria e Parë |
| 3 | Veleçiku | 22 | 16 | 3 | 3 | 61 | 13 | +48 | 51 | Play-off promotion to 2022–23 Kategoria e Parë |
| 4 | Gramshi | 22 | 11 | 5 | 6 | 38 | 31 | +7 | 38 | Play-off promotion to 2022–23 Kategoria e Parë |
| 5 | Murlani | 22 | 11 | 2 | 9 | 48 | 25 | +23 | 35 | Play-off promotion to 2022–23 Kategoria e Parë |
| 6 | Iliria | 22 | 9 | 4 | 9 | 30 | 26 | +4 | 31 | |
| 7 | Elbasani (D) | 22 | 8 | 4 | 10 | 36 | 51 | −15 | 28 | Dissolved after the season |
| 8 | Shënkolli | 22 | 7 | 4 | 11 | 36 | 56 | −20 | 25 | |
| 9 | Bulqiza | 22 | 7 | 3 | 12 | 33 | 63 | −30 | 24 | |
| 10 | Ada (O) | 22 | 5 | 4 | 13 | 23 | 38 | −15 | 19 | Play-off relegation to 2022–23 Kategoria e Tretë |
| 11 | Klosi (R) | 22 | 4 | 4 | 14 | 21 | 45 | −24 | 16 | Relegation to 2022–23 Kategoria e Tretë |
| 12 | Internacional Tirana (Note: Internacional was deducted 3 points after failing to show up in an away match against Klosi.) (R) | 22 | 1 | 0 | 21 | 15 | 97 | −82 | 0 | Relegation to 2022–23 Kategoria e Tretë |

Source: Soccerway
Rules for classification: 1) points; 2) head-to-head points; 3) head-to-head goal difference; 4) goal difference; 5) number of goals scored; 6) draw. (Head-to-head record is applied for clubs with the same number of points only once all matches between said clubs have been played.)
(D) Disqualified; (O) Play-off winners; (P) Promoted; (R) Relegated

==== Results ====
| Home \ Away | ADA | BUL | ELB | GRA | ILI | INT | KLO | LUZ | MUR | ORI | SHË | VEL |
|---|---|---|---|---|---|---|---|---|---|---|---|---|
| Ada | — | 2–1 | 0–4 | 4–1 | 1–2 | 3–0 | 2–2 | 0–1 | 2–1 | 0–3 | 0–1 | 0–2 |
| Bulqiza | 5–2 | — | 1–7 | 1–1 | 2–1 | 5–1 | 2–0 | 0–2 | 1–4 | 1–4 | 2–2 | 0–15 |
| Elbasani | 1–0 | 1–3 | — | 1–1 | 2–1 | 2–1 | 0–0 | 1–3 | 1–1 | 1–1 | 3–5 | 2–0 |
| Gramshi | 2–0 | 1–0 | 4–0 | — | 1–0 | 4–0 | 4–0 | 2–2 | 3–1 | 2–0 | 2–0 | 1–3 |
| Iliria | 0–0 | 4–1 | 2–1 | 2–0 | — | 5–0 | 2–0 | 0–0 | 0–2 | 1–4 | 3–1 | 0–2 |
| Internacional | 2–1 | 1–2 | 2–3 | 0–3 | 0–1 | — | 1–4 | 1–15 | 1–3 | 1–4 | 2–3 | 0–7 |
| Klosi | 1–1 | 1–0 | 0–1 | 1–3 | 0–2 | 3–0 | — | 0–3 | 1–5 | 0–2 | 3–2 | 0–2 |
| Luzi 2008 | 4–1 | 4–2 | 6–0 | 5–1 | 2–0 | 6–1 | 1–1 | — | 1–0 | 1–0 | 7–1 | 0–0 |
| Murlani | 0–2 | 5–0 | 5–1 | 1–0 | 2–2 | 6–0 | 2–1 | 0–1 | — | 0–1 | 5–0 | 1–2 |
| Oriku | 1–0 | 1–1 | 6–0 | 8–0 | 2–0 | 8–0 | 5–1 | 1–0 | 2–0 | — | 3–0 | 2–0 |
| Shënkolli | 1–1 | 2–3 | 5–4 | 1–1 | 2–2 | 3–1 | 2–1 | 1–3 | 1–3 | 0–3 | — | 3–0 |
| Veleçiku | 3–1 | 2–0 | 4–0 | 1–1 | 1–0 | 6–0 | 3–1 | 0–0 | 2–1 | 2–0 | 4–0 | — |

Source: Soccerway
Legend: Blue = home team win; Yellow = draw; Red = away team win.
For upcoming matches, an "a" indicates there is an article about the rivalry between the two participants.

=== Group B ===
| Pos | Team | Pld | W | D | L | GF | GA | GD | Pts | Promotion or relegation |
|---|---|---|---|---|---|---|---|---|---|---|
| 1 | Flamurtari (C, P) | 22 | 18 | 4 | 0 | 57 | 7 | +50 | 58 | Promotion to 2022–23 Kategoria e Parë |
| 2 | Labëria | 22 | 17 | 3 | 2 | 60 | 17 | +43 | 54 | Play-off promotion to 2022–23 Kategoria e Parë |
| 3 | Devolli | 22 | 13 | 7 | 2 | 36 | 14 | +22 | 46 | Play-off promotion to 2022–23 Kategoria e Parë |
| 4 | Sopoti | 22 | 14 | 2 | 6 | 51 | 31 | +20 | 44 | Play-off promotion to 2022–23 Kategoria e Parë |
| 5 | Albpetrol | 22 | 8 | 4 | 10 | 33 | 28 | +5 | 28 | Play-off promotion to 2022–23 Kategoria e Parë |
| 6 | Tepelena | 22 | 8 | 3 | 11 | 27 | 36 | −9 | 27 | |
| 7 | Naftëtari | 22 | 6 | 4 | 12 | 23 | 36 | −13 | 22 | |
| 8 | Memaliaj | 22 | 7 | 1 | 14 | 22 | 59 | −37 | 22 | |
| 9 | Luftëtari | 22 | 5 | 6 | 11 | 26 | 35 | −9 | 21 | |
| 10 | Gramozi (R) | 22 | 6 | 2 | 14 | 16 | 35 | −19 | 20 | Play-off relegation to 2022–23 Kategoria e Tretë |
| 11 | Përmeti (R) | 22 | 5 | 4 | 13 | 17 | 42 | −25 | 19 | Relegation to 2022–23 Kategoria e Tretë |
| 12 | Këlcyra (R) | 22 | 4 | 2 | 16 | 18 | 46 | −28 | 14 | Relegation to 2022–23 Kategoria e Tretë |

Source: Soccerway
Rules for classification: 1) points; 2) head-to-head points; 3) head-to-head goal difference; 4) goal difference; 5) number of goals scored; 6) draw. (Head-to-head record is applied for clubs with the same number of points only once all matches between said clubs have been played.)
(C) Champions; (P) Promoted; (R) Relegated

==== Results ====
| Home \ Away | ALB | DEV | FLA | GRM | KËL | LAB | LUF | MEM | NAF | PËR | SOP | TEP |
|---|---|---|---|---|---|---|---|---|---|---|---|---|
| Albpetrol | — | 1–2 | 1–2 | 4–0 | 2–0 | 1–2 | 0–1 | 1–0 | 0–2 | 0–0 | 4–1 | 1–1 |
| Devolli | 0–0 | — | 0–2 | 2–1 | 5–3 | 1–0 | 1–1 | 6–0 | 2–0 | 2–0 | 2–2 | 2–0 |
| Flamurtari | 4–1 | 0–0 | — | 2–0 | 5–0 | 3–0 | 4–1 | 6–0 | 4–0 | 6–0 | 2–0 | 1–1 |
| Gramozi | 0–2 | 0–1 | 0–1 | — | 2–1 | 0–3 | 2–1 | 1–0 | 2–1 | 3–2 | 0–2 | 1–0 |
| Këlcyra | 2–4 | 0–1 | 0–1 | 1–0 | — | 1–2 | 0–0 | 1–0 | 0–0 | 0–1 | 3–2 | 2–0 |
| Labëria | 2–1 | 1–1 | 1–1 | 3–1 | 6–0 | — | 4–2 | 7–0 | 2–2 | 4–0 | 2–1 | 3–0 |
| Luftëtari | 1–1 | 1–1 | 0–1 | 2–1 | 3–0 | 0–2 | — | 4–2 | 2–2 | 1–1 | 1–3 | 2–1 |
| Memaliaj | 1–0 | 0–2 | 0–3 | 1–1 | 1–0 | 0–4 | 2–1 | — | 2–1 | 3–2 | 1–4 | 4–3 |
| Naftëtari | 2–3 | 0–1 | 0–3 | 1–0 | 4–2 | 1–4 | 1–0 | 1–0 | — | 1–1 | 0–1 | 3–2 |
| Përmeti | 0–3 | 1–1 | 0–3 | 1–0 | 2–1 | 0–2 | 1–0 | 1–2 | 1–0 | — | 1–2 | 0–2 |
| Sopoti | 4–3 | 1–0 | 1–1 | 3–0 | 3–1 | 1–4 | 2–1 | 7–2 | 3–1 | 3–0 | — | 4–0 |
| Tepelena | 1–0 | 0–3 | 1–2 | 1–1 | 2–0 | 0–2 | 3–1 | 3–1 | 1–0 | 3–2 | 2–1 | — |

Source: Soccerway
Legend: Blue = home team win; Yellow = draw; Red = away team win.
For upcoming matches, an "a" indicates there is an article about the rivalry between the two participants.

== Final ==
8 May 2022
15:00

| Luzi 2008 | 1−1 (a.e.t.) | Flamurtari |
|---|---|---|
| Gjinaj 79' | | Pjeshka 48' |
Penalties
| Ferraj (penalty scored); Xhika (penalty missed); Hoxha (penalty scored); Merdini (penalty missed) | 2−4 | (penalty scored) Ramadani; (penalty scored) Pjeshka; (penalty scored) Ribaj; (penalty scored) Metani |

Selman Stërmasi Stadium, Tirana

== Group A Promotion play-offs ==
Semi-finals
Oriku | 2
Murlani | 0
Veleçiku | w/o
Gramshi

Final
Oriku | 1
Veleçiku | 0

Notes

1. Veleçiku won on walkover as Gramshi was banned to participate in the play-offs by the federation due to match fixing allegations.

== Semi-finals ==
4 May 2022
15:00

| Oriku | 2−0 | Murlani |
|---|---|---|
| Kongjini 80'; Çapoj 87' |

Orikum Stadium, Orikum

4 May 2022
15:00

| Veleçiku | Cancelled | Gramshi |

Kompleksi Vëllezërit Duli, Koplik

== Final ==
8 May 2022
15:00

| Oriku | 1−0 | Veleçiku |
|---|---|---|
| Tushi 36' |

Nexhip Trungu Stadium, Cërrik

Oriku qualified to the final play-off match.

== Group B Promotion play-offs ==
Semi-finals
Labëria | 2
Albpetrol | 0
Devolli | 0
Sopoti | 0

Final
Labëria | 0 (3)
Devolli (a.e.t.) | 0 (4)

== Semi-finals ==
4 May 2022
15:00

| Labëria | 2−0 | Albpetrol |
|---|---|---|
| Sinaj 14', 43' |

Labëria Complex, Nartë

4 May 2022
15:00

| Devolli | 0−0 | Sopoti |

Bilisht Stadium, Bilisht

Devolli qualified to the final as the team with the higher ranking.

== Final ==
8 May 2022
15:00

| Labëria | 0−0 (a.e.t.) | Devolli |
Penalties
| Haruni (penalty scored); Mirani (penalty scored); Deliaj (penalty scored); Kreshpa (penalty missed); Rapo (penalty missed); Gjoni (penalty missed) | 3−4 | (penalty scored) Pere; (penalty missed) Cane; (penalty missed) Demiri; (penalty scored) Ametlli; (penalty scored) González; (penalty scored) Nallbati |

Sopoti Stadium, Librazhd

Devolli qualified to the final play-off match.

== Relegation play-offs ==
8 May 2022
15:00

| Ada | 2−1 | Gramozi |
|---|---|---|
| Rrasa 41'; Keshtejaku 61' | | Osmani 45' |

National Sports Centre, Kamëz

14 May 2022
15:00

| Gramozi | 1−3 | Delvina |
|---|---|---|
| Mydin 79' | | Çulli 9'; Gjeçi 83'; Musta 90' |

Roza Haxhiu Stadium, Lushnjë

Gramozi was relegated to Kategoria e Tretë, while Delvina was promoted to Kategoria e Dytë.

== Top scorers ==
| Rank | Player | Club | Goals |
|---|---|---|---|
| 1 | (Albania) Ervis Kongjini | Oriku | 26 |
| 2 | (Albania) Anton Lleshi | Shënkolli | 21 |
| 2 | (Albania) Eriol Merdini | Luzi 2008 | 21 |
| 4 | (Albania) Aleksandër Dalanaj | Labëria | 18 |
| 4 | (Albania) Artur Sejdini | Sopoti | 18 |
| 6 | (Albania) Gersi Diamanti | Flamurtari | 16 |
