= Sherif Sadiku =

Albanian footballer

Personal information
- Full name: Sherif Sadiku
- Date of birth: 15 December 1998 (age 27)
- Place of birth: Elbasan, Albania
- Position: Striker

Youth career
- 2014–2015: Fushë Mbreti
- 2015–2016: Belshi

Senior career*
Years	Team	Apps	(Gls)
2016–2017	Elbasani	14	(0)
2017–2018	Shkumbini	15	(0)
2018–2019	Elbasani	9	(1)
2019	Team Ticino	10	(1)
2019–2020	Shkumbini Peqin	11	(0)
Total		59	(2)
- * Club domestic league appearances and goals as of 15 February 2026

Sherif Sadiku (born 15 December 1998) is an Albanian professional footballer who plays as a striker for Shkumbini Peqin in the Albanian First Division.

== Club career ==
He played for Shkumbini Peqin in the 2018–19 campaign, collecting 15 league appearances with no goals.

Sadiku returned to his boyhood club Elbasani for the 2018–19 season. He scored his first professional goal on 8 December 2018 in a 2–0 home win over Turbina Cërrik to remove his side from the last position in championship.

== Personal life ==
His brother, Armando Sadiku, is also a professional footballer who plays for Legia Warsaw and the Albania national team.

== Career statistics ==
As of 8 December 2018

Club	Season	League			Cup		Continental		Total	
Club	Season	Division	Apps	Goals	Apps	Goals	Apps	Goals	Apps	Goals
Elbasani	2016–17	Albanian First Division	14	0	0	0	—		14	0
Shkumbini Peqin	2017–18	Albanian First Division	15	0	1	0	—		16	0
Elbasani	2016–17	Albanian First Division	7	1	0	0	—		7	1
Career total			36	1	1	0	0	0	37	1
