= 2019 Kategoria e Tretë =

Kategoria e Tretë
- Season: 2019
- Champions: Selenica; 1st title
- Promoted: Mirdita; Selenica
- Matches: 30
- Goals: 128 (4.27 per match)

The 2019 Kategoria e Tretë was the 16th official season of the Albanian football fourth division since its establishment. The season began on 22 February 2019. There were 6 teams competing this season. Selenica and Mirdita gained promotion to the 2019–20 Kategoria e Dytë. Selenica won their first Kategoria e Tretë title.

== Changes from last season ==
=== Team changes ===
==== From Third Division ====
Promoted to Kategoria e Dytë:

- Term
2019 Kategoria e Tretë teams.

=== Stadia by capacity and locations ===
Team	Location	Stadium	Capacity
Divjaka	Divjakë		
Mirdita	Rubik		
Osumi	Ura Vajgurore		
Selenica	Selenicë	Selenicë Stadium	4,000
Shkëndija Tiranë	Tirana	AFA Sports Centre	
Valbona	Bajram Curri		

== League standings ==
Pos	Team	Pld	W	D	L	GF	GA	GD	Pts	Promotion
1	Selenica (C, P)	10	6	3	1	19	8	+11	21	Promotion to 2019–20 Kategoria e Dytë
2	Mirdita (Note: Mirdita were deducted 3 points after fielding an ineligible player.) (P)	10	7	2	1	32	14	+18	20	Promotion to 2019–20 Kategoria e Dytë
3	Divjaka	10	6	1	3	27	13	+14	19	
4	Valbona	10	5	1	4	19	11	+8	16	
5	Osumi	10	2	1	7	19	27	−8	7	
6	Shkëndija Tiranë	10	0	0	10	12	55	−43	0	

Rules for classification: 1) points; 2) goal difference; 3) number of goals scored; 4) head-to-head points; 5) head-to-head goal difference; 6) draw. (Head-to-head record is applied for clubs with the same number of points only once all matches between said clubs have been played.)
(C) Champions; (P) Promoted
