= Armando Sadiku =

Albanian footballer (born 1991)

Personal information
- Date of birth: 27 May 1991 (age 35)
- Place of birth: Elbasan, Albania
- Height: 1.86 m (6 ft 1 in)
- Position: Striker

Youth career
- 1998–2007: Fushë Mbreti
- 2007–2008: Turbina

Senior career*
Years	Team	Apps	(Gls)
2008–2009	Turbina Cërrik	40	(10)
2009–2010	Gramozi Ersekë	29	(8)
2010–2011	Elbasani	14	(5)
2011–2012	Locarno	39	(27)
2012–2013	Lugano	43	(24)
2014–2017	Zürich	55	(15)
2015–2016	Zürich U21	8	(2)
2016	→ Vaduz (loan)	16	(7)
2017	→ Lugano (loan)	16	(9)
2017–2018	Legia Warsaw	17	(2)
2018–2020	Levante	6	(0)
2019	→ Lugano (loan)	16	(3)
2019–2020	→ Málaga (loan)	36	(13)
2020–2021	BB Erzurumspor	5	(0)
2021	Bolívar	7	(2)
2021–2022	Las Palmas	24	(4)
2022–2023	Cartagena	28	(8)
2023–2024	Mohun Bagan	22	(8)
2024–2025	Goa	22	(9)
2025–2026	Bellinzona	24	(5)
Total		467	(161)

International career
2009	Albania U19	2	(0)
2011–2012	Albania U21	7	(6)
2012–2023	Albania	39	(12)
- * Club domestic league appearances and goals

Armando Sadiku (born 27 May 1991) is an Albanian former professional footballer who played as a striker.

Sadiku began his senior career with Turbina playing two seasons in Albania's second tier Kategoria e Parë. In 2009 he went to Gramozi in top-flight division Kategoria Superiore where he had a breakthrough year, scoring eight goals, which earned him a move to fellow top-flight side Elbasani. Sadiku played only a half season with Elbasani, as he was banned from Albanian football due to non-sporting behavior.

His ban forced him to move abroad going to Switzerland playing at first for Locarno. Sadiku found his form in Switzerland, becoming a reliable goalscorer in second tier Swiss Challenge League, where he won the top goalscorer award in his first full season. In July 2012 he moved to Lugano, and scored 20 goals in the 2012-13 season. This was enough for him to be the league's top scorer for the second year in a row.

In November 2013, he joined top flight side Zürich, but his time at the club was marred by lack of playing time and injuries. Most notably a knee ligament injury in May 2014, which left him sidelined for six months. He returned the next season but failed to make a significant impact, scoring only three goals, but the club still won the 2013–14 Swiss Cup.

Sadiku's form improved in the first half of 2015–16 season, scoring eight goals in 18 appearances. Despite being the top scorer of the team at this time, he was sent on loan to fellow relegation strugglers Vaduz, which was dubbed as an "owngoal" by Swiss media. Sadiku helped Vaduz to retain their top flight status for another season, in addition relegating his parent club. In January 2017, Sadiku was sent on loan again, this time at his former side FC Lugano where he rejoined Paolo Tramezzani.

In 2023, following a successful stint with the Spanish club FC Cartagena, he joined Indian Super League side Mohun Bagan Super Giant.

At youth level, he represented Albania under-19 and under-21 side He made his senior debut in 2012 in a friendly against Georgia. He was part of Albania's UEFA Euro 2016 squad, where he scored Albania's first-ever goal at a UEFA European Championship. Sadiku's 12 goals for Albania mean he sits fifth in the country's top scorer rankings.

== Club career ==
=== Early career ===
Born in Cërrik, Elbasan, Sadiku started his youth career aged 7 with a local club Fushë Mbreti from where he moved later at the youth ranks of his boyhood club Turbina, making his professional debut in the Kategoria e Parë whereas he played during the two seasons 2007–08 and 2008–09.

=== Gramozi ===
In the summer of the 2009, Sadiku completed a transfer to newly promoted Kategoria Superiore side Gramozi, owned by the brother of Albanian oil tycoon Rezart Taci; it was the club's first ever top flight season. He made his first top flight appearance on 23 August at the age of 18 in the opening matchday against Shkumbini which ended in a goalless draw, with Sadiku coming on in the second half.

He opened his scoring account on 19 September in matchday 4 versus Skënderbeu, netting a tap-in for the temporary equalizer in an eventual 4–1 away loss. One week later, Sadiku was again on the scoresheet as Gramozi recorded their first ever Kategoria Superiore win by beating Flamurtari.

Sadiku finished his only Gramozi season by scoring 8 goals in 28 league appearances, as Gramori was relegated after only one season.

=== Elbasani ===
During the summer transfer window, Sadiku signed for his hometown club Elbasani. During the 2010–11 season first-half he played 14 matches and scored 5 goals. He made his debut with the club on 22 August 2010 during the opening league match against Tirana at home, playing 75 minutes in a 1–1 draw. He scored his first goal of the season in his second appearance six days later, netting a last-minute winner in a 2–1 away win over Bylis.

On 19 December 2010, during the league match against Laçi, Sadiku, who had scored earlier in the match, was sent-off in the 82nd minute. A minute before his dismissal, he scored but was caught offside by the assistant referee Eduard Miho, which enraged Sadiku, who ran towards him and pushed away by throat, spitting and also insulted him the process. Disciplinary Committee suspended Sadiku from Albanian football for two years, also fining him. That was his last match in Albanian football, as Sadiku left the club to purchase a career in Switzerland. As it happened with Gramozi in previous season, Elbasani also ranked in the last place and were relegated to Kategoria e Parë.

=== Locarno ===
Sadiku moved for the first time aboard in March 2011 where he completed a transfer to Swiss Challenge League side Locarno. The transfer was made official on 13th. He arrived in the morning and even travelled with the side to the away fixture with Schaffhausen. He made his debut later that day, playing for 82 minutes in a 2–1 loss. He opened his scoring account on Switzerland on his third appearance for the club, netting the winning goal against Chiasso on 1 April for a 2–1 win.

However that goal was to open the floodgates of the striker scoring in Switzerland, as he managed a brace against Kriens, and goals versus Aarau and Winterthur, which gave him 9 in 12 appearances as the team barely avoided relegation.

Sadiku begun 2011–12 season on strong fashion, netting twice on the opening day against Wohlen as the match was lost 5–2. He returned to the scoring sheet later on 20 August by scoring a brace in Locarno's 3–0 defeat of Étoile Carouge, giving his side the first win of the season. Then he scored on Swiss Cup round 2 against Wil which was not enough as Locarno was eliminated on penalties after regular time ended 1–1. Sadiku concluded his second Locarno season by netting 19 goals in the championship, being the highest scorer as Locarno finished 9th.

=== Lugano ===
On 23 July 2012, Lugano confirmed via their official website the purchase of Sadiku on a three-year contract. With the deal Sadiku would earn CHF200,000 per season.

He made his competitive debut one week later in matchday 3 of championship against Biel-Bienne, netting a brace to lead the team into 4–0 home win. He scored another brace later on 19 August in the 4–1 home win over Wohlen to take his tally up to 4 league goals. Sadiku reached double-figures for the second season in a row on 29 October where he scored his team's only goal in a 1–2 home defeat to Winterthur. Sadiku eventually finished his first Lugano season making 32 league appearances collecting 2849 minutes and netting 20 goals in, to become top scorer as the team finished 7th in the championship, failing to clinch a spot to top flight next season. He also contributed with 2 goals in 2 cup matches.

He started the new season by netting in the 1–3 home defeat to St. Gallen for the 2013–14 Swiss Cup round 2 which eliminated Lugano from the competition. During the first part of 2013–14 season, Sadiku scored 6 goals in 11 appearances. including a brace in the 3–1 home win over Schaffhausen, before leaving in November.

=== Zürich ===
On 13 November 2013, Zürich and Lugano reached an agreement for the transfer of Sadiku for €500,000. The transfer was made official on 1 January 2014 where the player signed a contract until June 2018, taking squad number 11. At Zürich, he found his Albania teammate Burim Kukeli.

Sadiku made his first Swiss Super League appearance on 1 February against Sion where he came in the last minutes. Sadiku scored his first top flight goal on 16 February in the 3–1 home win over Thun.

Later on 26 March, he made another appearance as substitute, entering in the final minutes of extra time of Swiss Cup semi-final match against Thun which finished in a goalless draw which lead the match to penalty shootouts where Sadiku successfully converted his penalty shootout attempt as the team won 5–4. He also played in the final of competition against Basel as Zürich won after extra-time to win their 8th cup in history. This win constituted his first career trophy.

On 10 May 2014, during the league match against St. Gallen, Sadiku entered as substitute in the 70th minute and was injured shortly after, breaking knee ligament which would keep him sidelined for the next 6 months.

Sadiku made his on-field return on 30 November 2014 in 2014–15 Swiss Super League matchday 17 versus Basel where he came as a substitute in a 1–2 home loss. He opened his scoring account for 2014–15 season during the 5–0 win over Cham for Swiss Cup round 3. He concluded 2014–15 season by scoring 3 goals in 14 league appearances, in addition 1 goal in 1 cup match.

==== Loan to Vaduz ====
During the first part of 2015–16 season, Sadiku was used scarcely, and often as a substitute by coach Sami Hyypiä despite being the team's top goalscorer in the league. That lead him to request a loan to another Swiss Super League side in order to play more to be ready to represent Albania in the UEFA Euro 2016 in France. His wish was fulfilled and on 12 January 2016 Sadiku was loaned out to the bottom-side Vaduz until the end of season. During his presentation one day later, Sadiku was allocated squad number 32 and dubbed his Vaduz move as the "right decision". His parent club Zürich was criticized by the Swiss media, which dubbed the loan an "own goal" and an "arrogant" decision.

Sadiku made his debut for the club on 6 February scoring a brace and providing two assists in a 5–2 away win against fellow relegation strugglers Lugano, one of his former sides. On 28 February, he was again on the scoresheet scoring his team's only goal in a 1–1 draw against Grasshopper, giving Vaduz one point.

On 6 April, he scored a brace in the 2015–16 Liechtenstein Cup semi-final match against Eschen/Mauren, helping the team to win the 2–1 and progress to the final. Four days later, Sadiku scored his fourth league goal for Vaduz and also provided an assist during the 3–0 home win against St. Gallen, helping Vaduz to a first success after six consecutive winless league matches. He scored his tenth league goal of the season during the 5–4 away defeat to Young Boys. Vaduz eventually finished 8th which was enough to avoid relegation.

He was returned to Zürich in the summer and was target of top European clubs from Serie A and Bundesliga, but didn't leave due to club's high economical demands.

==== Loan to Lugano ====
In January 2017 assistant manager of Sadiku at Albania national team Paolo Tramezzani was appointed as a head coach of Lugano and soon after he made Sadiku himself to move on loan at Lugano making a return after 3 years thus remaining in the Super League. He made his debut after return on 4 February in team's 4–0 away defeat at Basel. Following his debut, he went on to score in five consecutive league matches, including the winner against St. Gallen, as Lugano become a contenter for a European spot next season. Sadiku formed a fierce partnership with Ezgjan Alioski, as the duo scored 25 goals together. On 7 May, Sadiku scored against Basel and celebrated by taking off his shirt receiving his second yellow card as the match finished in a 2–2 draw. On 21 May, Sadiku scored against Vaduz to open Lugano's way for a 3–0 victory which secured them participation in the 2017–18 UEFA Europa League next season. He finished the second part of the 2016–17 season by scoring 9 times in 16 appearances.

=== Legia Warsaw ===
On 12 July 2017, Sadiku joined Polish Ekstraklasa side Legia Warsaw by penning a three-year contract. The transfer fee was undisclosed, but it was reported that Legia paid €1.5 million for his services, making Sadiku the most expensive purchase of Polish football. He was presented two days later, where he was given squad number 99, stating: "I am happy I have signed with such a great club. This is a good step in my career. I hope we will qualify for the Champions League group stage."

Sadiku made his first appearance for Legia on 15 July in the opening Ekstraklasa matchday against Gornik Zabrze, playing in the second half and scoring his team's only goal in a 3–1 away defeat. Eleven days later, Sadiku made his UEFA Champions League debut by scoring a tap-in in a 3–1 away defeat to Astana in the first leg of third qualifying round. Sadiku was on the score-sheet also in his Polish Cup debut on 8 August where he netted in the last moments of the 4–1 win over Wisła Puławy in the round of 32.

Sadiku was sold by Legia on deadline day on 31 January to La Liga outfit Levante for an undisclosed fee. During his time at Warsaw he netted 7 times in 25 official matches.

=== Levante ===
On 31 January 2018, in the deadline day, Sadiku was signed by Levante of La Liga for an undisclosed fee. The player signed a contract until June 2020. After several weeks sidelined due to knee injury, Sadiku made his debut for the club on 26 February by starting in the 0–2 loss to Real Betis. By doing so, he became only the second Albanian ever, the first being Valdet Rama, to play in La Liga. On 4 March, in the final minutes of the first half of the match against Espanyol, Sadiku suffered a head-to-head clash with goalkeeper Diego López; he was replaced at half time while López was sent to hospital. Sadiku then underwent surgery on his nose.

He concluded the second part of 2017–18 season by making only six league appearances, scoring no goals in the process. In August 2018, Sadiku suffered a major injury in his left knee while playing in a friendly against Netherlands' Heerenveen. He remained sidelined for the entire first part of 2018–19 season.

==== Return to Lugano ====
On 15 January 2019, Lugano announced to have reached an agreement with Levante for the acquisition of Sadiku, who signed until the end of 2018–19 campaign. The contract included a clause, in which the Spanish has the right to rebuy Sadiku in the next transfer window. Club president Enzo Renzetti expressed his delight for the transfer, stating: "I have personally spoke with the boy. He is very motivated and is waiting with impatience to join us."

==== Loan to Málaga ====
On 2 September 2019, Sadiku extended his contract with Levante until 2021, and was immediately loaned to Segunda División side Málaga CF.

=== Erzurumspor ===
Sadiku transferred to the Turkish club BB Erzurumspor in the Süper Lig, and signed a one-year contract. Throughout a year, he was infrequently used, appeared in only five games without scoring a goal. He was released after a year.

=== Bolívar ===
After having an unsuccessful season in Turkey, Sadiku decided to venture to South America where he made history as the first Albanian to play in Bolivia, when he signed for Club Bolívar, a major giant in Bolivian football, in 23 January. Two months later, he made history when he appeared in the 2021 Copa Libertadores, the first Albanian to debut in the most prestigious club competition in South America, in a 5–0 thumping of Uruguay's Montevideo Wanderers.

=== Las Palmas and Cartagena ===
On 29 July 2021, Sadiku returned to Spain and signed a one-year contract with UD Las Palmas. On 17 July of the following year, he moved to fellow second division side FC Cartagena on a one-year deal.

=== Mohun Bagan ===
On 25 June 2023, Sadiku joined Indian Super League club Mohun Bagan Super Giant on a two-year deal. He made his debut in the Durand Cup, playing the full first half in the Kolkata Derby against East Bengal FC which eventually ended in a 1–0 loss. He scored his first goal in a 3–1 win over Abahani Limited Dhaka in AFC Cup Play-off round. In the 2023 Durand Cup semi-final clash against FC Goa, he scored the winning goal for his team in the form of a long-ranger goal and led his team to the final. In the final, Mohun Bagan Super Giant defeated their arch-rivals East Bengal FC and got their first trophy of the 2023–24 season.

=== FC Goa ===
Sadiku joined another Indian Super League side FC Goa in July 2024. He scored the deciding goal for the club against A-League Men side Brisbane Roar in their 1–0 win at a group stage match of the 2024 Bandodkar Trophy. On 14 April 2025, after helping Goa to second place in the league, it was announced that Sadiku had mutually agreed to part ways with Goa.

=== Bellinzona ===
On 30 July 2025, he returned to Switzerland for the first time since 2019, joining Swiss Challenge League side Bellinzona.

== International career ==
=== Youth teams ===
Sadiku was called up at the Albania national under-19 football team by coach Ramadan Shehu for a double friendly match against Cyprus U19 on 20 & 21 October 2009. In both games he played as a starter and was substituted off in the second half. He was included in Ramadan Shehu's Albania U19 squad for their 2010 UEFA European Under-19 Championship qualification

Sadiku participated with the Albania under-21 side coached by Artan Bushati in the 2013 UEFA European Under-21 Championship qualification. In the 2nd round match against Moldova U21 on 7 September 2011 he scored two goals as a half-time substitute to help Albania to win 4–3 after coming from behind and to earn their first points of the campaign. He followed this by scoring another two goals against Poland on 11 October but this did not suffice as Albania lost away 4–3. Then in the next month November he scored another brace against Portugal to give Albania a 2–2 draw and taking his tally to 6 goals in his first 5 games. Albania ended campaign collecting 5 points in 8 games and was ranked last but Sadiku with his 6 goals concluded the group as top goalscorer.

=== Senior team ===
New Albania senior team coach Gianni De Biasi, called up Sadiku for his first match as a head coach, a friendly against Georgia on 29 February 2012 at Mikheil Meskhi Stadium in Tbilisi. He made his senior international debut in the game, coming on as an 82nd-minute substitute for goalscorer and fellow debutant Edgar Çani in the 2–1 loss for Albania. He was called up then to Albania's next two friendliest against Qatar and Iran in May 2012, where he played as a second-half substitute in both games, which Albania won them both.

==== 2014 FIFA World Cup qualification ====
For the 2014 FIFA World Cup qualifiers, new coach Gianni De Biasi had introduced young forwards into the senior national team to create more competition for places in the team. Young forwards such as Sadiku was among Edgar Çani and Bekim Balaj provided competition for the established and mature internationals which were Erjon Bogdani and Hamdi Salihi. In the opening match against Cyprus for the 2014 FIFA World Cup qualifiers on 7 September 2012, Sadiku managed to play as a starter among Salihi forming the duo strikers partnership and Sadiku himself managed to score his first international goal. His goal came in the 36th minute after a cross from free-kick in the right side by Alban Meha and it was the opening goal of the game to open Albania's way towards a 3–1 win.

==== UEFA Euro 2016 campaign ====
Sadiku was not called regularly during the UEFA Euro 2016 qualifying campaign; even when he was part of the squad, he was seen as the third choice by manager De Biasi, ranked behind Cikalleshi and Balaj. He made his first appearance in Group I on 4 September 2015 versus Denmark, replacing Lenjani at 64th minute as Albania took a goalless draw at Telia Parken. In the final matchday against Armenia on 11 October, Sadiku came on at 59th minute and netted 17 minutes later to make the score 3–0; his weak shot inside the box was enough to beat goalkeeper Kasparov after a cross by Roshi. This win cemented Albania the second place in Group I which secured them a place at UEFA Euro 2016, in its first ever appearance at major football tournament.

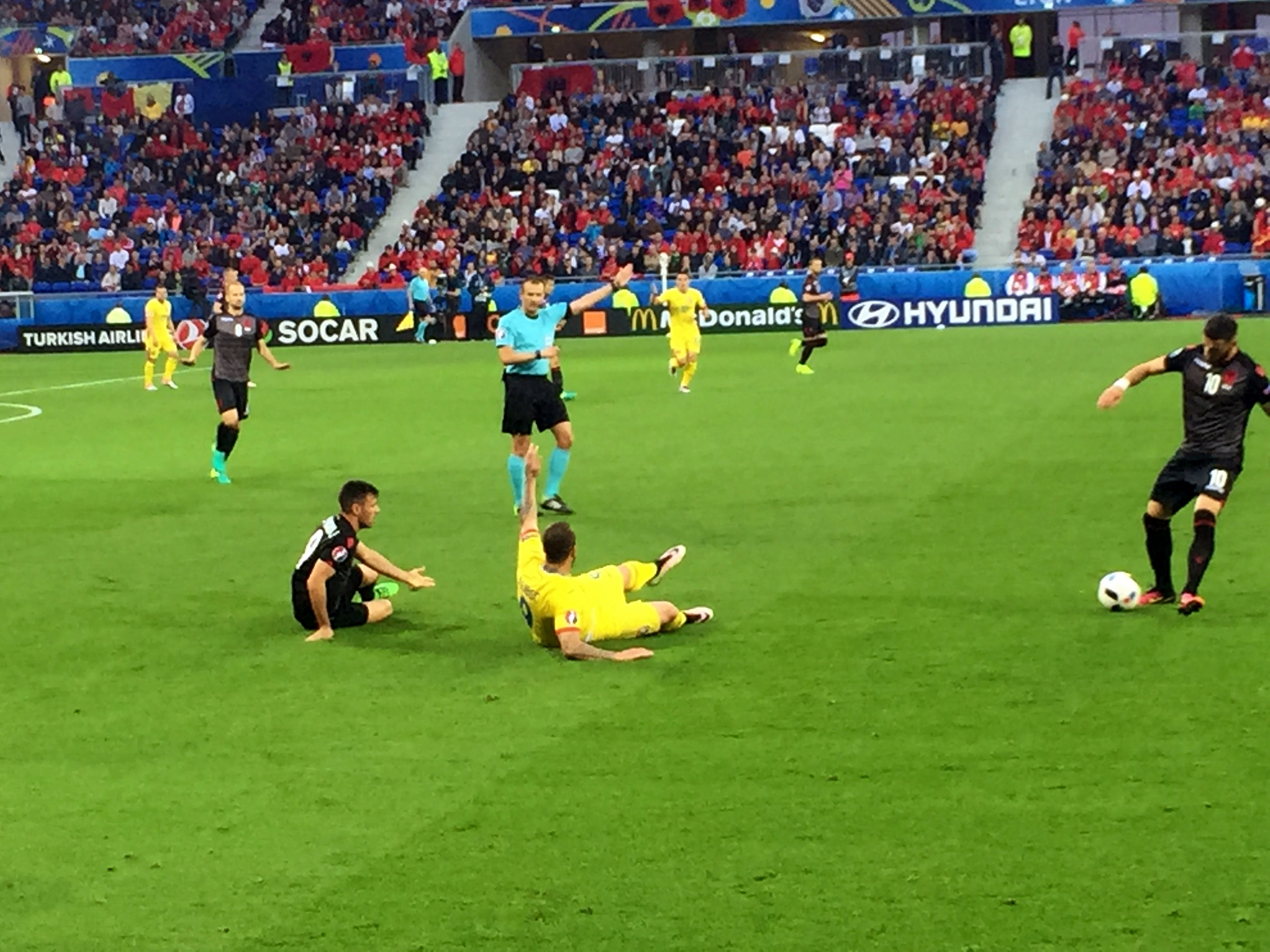
Sadiku (player with the ball) playing for Albania at the EURO 2016

On 21 May 2016, Sadiku was named in Albania's preliminary 27-man squad for UEFA Euro 2016, and in Albania's final 23-man UEFA Euro 2016 squad on 31 May. He made his first ever UEFA European Championship appearance on 11 June 2016 in the opening Group A match against Switzerland as Albania conceded early and lost 0–1. In the final group match versus Romania eight days later, Sadiku netted a header in the first half to lead the team to a historic 1–0 win; in doing so, he became the first Albanian player to score a goal in the UEFA European Championship and Albania took their first ever win in a major football tournament. It was also Albania's first win over Romania since 1948. Albania finished the group in the third position with three points and with a goal difference –2, and was ranked last in the third-placed teams, which eventually eliminated them.

==== 2018 FIFA World Cup qualification ====
For the qualifiers of 2018 FIFA World Cup qualification, Sadiku's Albania was placed in Group G along with Spain, Italy, Israel, Macedonia and Liechtenstein. On 29 August 2016, he was in the team's for the friendly against Morocco and the opening qualifying match against Macedonia. He played as a second-half substitute in team's goalless draw against Morocco at the newly renovated Loro Boriçi Stadium. On 5 September in the match against Macedonia, Sadiku opened the score with right-footed shoot just outside the box as Albania won 2–1 thanks to a goal in the last minutes. Later that month, Sadiku suffered an injury while playing for Zürich which kept him sidelined for the next two qualifying match against Liechtenstein and Spain in October, which ended respectively with a 2–0 win and 0–2 defeat. He also missed the match at Elbasan Arena against Israel which ended in a 0–3 defeat as Albania was dropped to fourth place.

Sadiku returned to the national team in March for the match against Italy and the friendly against Bosnia and Herzegovina. He returned to the field for the match against Italy, entering in the final 23 minutes as Albania suffered another defeat. On 12 June 2017, in the match against Israel at Sammy Ofer Stadium, Sadiku returned to the starting lineup after nine months to score twice in the first half, both long-range strikes, as Albania got their revenge on Israel with a 3–0 away victory.

==== UEFA Euro 2020 qualifiers ====
On 14 March 2019, Sadiku received an invitation for the opening UEFA Euro 2020 qualifying matches against Turkey and Andorra, returning in the national team after one year. On 22 March, he played as a second-half substitute in the first game against Turkey at Loro Boriçi, recording his cap in 361 days. Three days later, new caretaker manager Ervin Bulku decided to start Sadiku in the second game against minnows Andorra; the striker scored in the 21st minute with the open net after benefiting from the wrong clearance of opposition goalkeeper Josep Gómes, paving way to a 3–0 win at Estadi Nacional. It was his 12th international goal, overtaking Hamdi Salihi to become Albania's fourth all-time top scorer.

== Sponsorship ==
In April 2016, Sadiku signed a sponsorship deal with American sportswear and equipment supplier, Nike.

== Personal life ==
Sadiku was born in the municipality of Elbasan Country. His father, Durim, is from Trebisht, Albania and his mother from Podujevë, Kosovo. Sadiku is related to Taulant and Granit Xhaka through his mother. His brother, Sherif Sadiku, is also a professional footballer who plays for Shkumbini in the Kategoria e Parë. Sadiku has cited his role model and favourite footballer the Swedish striker Zlatan Ibrahimović, and is also fan of Italian club Internazionale. Sadiku has a Bulgarian passport.

He is also known to be a supporter of Socialist Party of Albania, having taken part in the 2013 and 2017 electoral campaigns. Following Albania's historic participation at UEFA Euro 2016, Sadiku was among the members of the national team who were issued diplomatic passports by the Albanian government in recognition of their achievement. On 30 December 2016, Sadiku was named "Honorary Citizen" of Elbasan for his contributions to sports. On 9 January 2018, Sadiku was engaged to Elona, a Kosovo Albanian dentist and fan of his, who he met via Facebook.

== Career statistics ==
=== Club ===
As of match played 8 January 2025

Appearances and goals by club, season and competition
Club	Season	League			Cup (Note: Includes Albanian Cup, Swiss Cup, Liechtenstein Football Cup, Polish Cup, Copa del Rey, Turkish Cup, Super Cup, Durand Cup)		Continental		Total	
Club	Season	Division	Apps	Goals	Apps	Goals	Apps	Goals	Apps	Goals
Turbina	2007–08	Kategoria e Parë	10	0	—		—		10	0
Turbina	2008–09	Kategoria e Parë	30	10	1	0	—		31	10
Turbina	Total		40	10	1	0	—		41	10
Gramozi	2009–10	Kategoria Superiore	29	8	3	0	—		32	8
Elbasani	2010–11	Kategoria Superiore	14	5	0	0	—		14	5
Locarno	2010–11	Swiss Challenge League	12	9	0	0	—		12	9
Locarno	2011–12	Swiss Challenge League	27	19	2	3	—		29	22
Locarno	2012–13	Swiss Challenge League	1	0	—		—		1	0
Locarno	Total		40	28	2	3	—		42	31
Lugano	2012–13	Swiss Challenge League	32	20	2	2	—		34	22
Lugano	2013–14	Swiss Challenge League	11	6	1	1	—		12	7
Lugano	Total		43	26	3	3	—		46	29
Zürich	2013–14	Swiss Super League	15	2	2	0	—		17	2
Zürich	2014–15	Swiss Super League	14	3	1	1	0	0	15	3
Zürich	2015–16	Swiss Super League	14	5	2	3	3 (Note: Appearance(s) in UEFA Europa League)	0	19	8
Zürich	2016–17	Swiss Challenge League	12	5	0	0	3	1	15	6
Zürich	Total		55	15	5	4	6	1	66	20
Zürich U21	2014–15	Swiss Promotion League	2	2	—		—		2	2
Zürich U21	2016–17	Swiss Promotion League	6	0	—		—		6	0
Zürich U21	Total		8	2	—		—		8	2
Vaduz (loan)	2015–16	Swiss Super League	16	7	2	2	—		18	9
Lugano (loan)	2016–17	Swiss Super League	16	9	0	0	—		16	9
Legia Warsaw	2017–18	Ekstraklasa	17	2	4	4	4 (Note: Two appearances in UEFA Champions League, two appearances in UEFA Europa League)	1	25	7
Levante	2017–18	La Liga	6	0	—		—		6	0
Lugano (loan)	2018–19	Swiss Super League	16	3	1	0	—		17	3
Málaga (loan)	2019–20	Segunda División	36	13	1	0	—		37	13
BB Erzurumspor	2020–21	Süper Lig	5	0	4	0	—		9	0
Bolivar	2021	Bolivian Primera División	7	2	—		8 (Note: Three appearances in Copa Libertadores, five appearances in Copa Sudamericana)	0	15	2
Las Palmas	2021–22	Segunda División	24	4	2	2	—		26	6
Cartagena	2022–23	Segunda División	28	8	3	0	—		31	8
Mohun Bagan	2023–24	Indian Super League	22	8	6	2	7 (Note: Appearances in AFC Cup)	1	35	11
Goa	2024–25	Indian Super League	13	9	0	0	0	0	13	9
Career total			435	159	37	20	25	3	491	181

=== International ===
Appearances and goals by national team and year
National team	Year	Apps	Goals
Albania	2012	7	1
Albania	2013	3	0
Albania	2014	1	0
Albania	2015	5	1
Albania	2016	9	5
Albania	2017	7	4
Albania	2018	1	0
Albania	2019	4	1
Albania	2020	1	0
Albania	2021	0	0
Albania	2022	0	0
Albania	2023	1	0
Total		39	12

As of 25 March 2019. Albania score listed first, score column indicates score after each Sadiku's goal.

International goals by date, venue, cap, opponent, score, result and competition
No.	Date	Venue	Cap	Opponent	Score	Result	Competition
1	7 September 2012	Qemal Stafa Stadium, Tirana, Albania	4	Cyprus	1–0	3–1	2014 FIFA World Cup qualification
2	11 October 2015	Vazgen Sargsyan Republican Stadium, Yerevan, Armenia	14	Armenia	3–0	3–0	UEFA Euro 2016 qualification
3	29 March 2016	Stade Josy Barthel, Route d'Arlon, Luxembourg	18	Luxembourg	1–0	2–0	Friendly
4	29 May 2016	Stadion Hartberg, Hartberg, Austria	19	Qatar	3–1	3–1	Friendly
5	3 June 2016	Stadio Atleti Azzurri d'Italia, Bergamo, Italy	20	Ukraine	1–1	1–3	Friendly
6	19 June 2016	Parc Olympique Lyonnais, Lyon, France	23	Romania	1–0	1–0	UEFA Euro 2016
7	5 September 2016	Loro Boriçi Stadium, Shkodër, Albania	25	Macedonia	1–0	2–1	2018 FIFA World Cup qualification
8	11 June 2017	Sammy Ofer Stadium, Haifa, Israel	28	Israel	1–0	3–0	2018 FIFA World Cup qualification
9	11 June 2017	Sammy Ofer Stadium, Haifa, Israel	28	Israel	2–0	3–0	2018 FIFA World Cup qualification
10	13 November 2017	New Antalya Stadium, Antalya, Turkey	32	Turkey	1–0	3–2	Friendly
11	13 November 2017	New Antalya Stadium, Antalya, Turkey	32	Turkey	2–0	3–2	Friendly
12	25 March 2019	Estadi Nacional, Andorra la Vella, Andorra	35	Andorra	1–0	3–0	UEFA Euro 2020 qualification

== Honours ==
Zürich

- Swiss Cup: 2013–14

Vaduz

- Liechtenstein Cup: 2015–16

Mohun Bagan

- Durand Cup: 2023
- Indian Super League Shield: 2023–24
- Indian Super League Cup: runner-up: 2023–24

FC Goa

- Bandodkar Trophy: 2024

Individual

- Polish Cup top scorer: 2017–18
