= Kledis Hida =

Albanian footballer

Personal information
- Date of birth: 26 March 2001 (age 25)
- Place of birth: Elbasan, Albania
- Position: Centre-back

Team information
- Current team: AF Elbasani

Youth career
- 2014–2016: Fushmbret
- 2016–2018: FC Pepa

Senior career*
Years	Team	Apps	(Gls)
2019	Elbasani	12	(0)
2019	Vëllaznimi		
2020–2022	Kukësi	2	(0)
2020–2021	→ Tomori (loan)	10	(1)
2022–2023	Tomori	25	(3)
2023–	AF Elbasani	1	(0)

International career^{‡}
2019	Albania U19	2	(0)
- * Club domestic league appearances and goals as of 10 February 2024 ‡ National team caps and goals as of 5 June 2019

Kledis Hida (born 26 March 2001) is an Albanian professional footballer who plays as a centre-back for Albanian club AF Elbasani.

== Honours ==
AF Elbasani

- Kategoria e Parë: 2023–24
