= KF Tirana in the Albanian Cup =

Here is a list of all of KF Tirana's Cup seasons from 1939 till end of most recent season. This list shows where they finished the season, how many ties won or lost, how many goals they scored and conceded, how many wins draws and losses they had throughout the season, goal difference, winning difference and number of matches played.

== Albanian Cup Performance Table ==
Season	Season ended	Goals	Wins	Draws	Losses	+/-Goals	Matches
1939	Winners	12- 8	3	0	1	+ 4	4
1948	Runners-up	4- 5	1	0	1	1	2
1949	Runners-up	8- 2	2	0	1	+ 6	3
1950	1/2 Finals	9- 3	3	0	0	+ 6	3
1951	1/4 Finals	2- 3	1	0	1	1	2
1952	Runners-up	9- 5	2	0	1	+ 4	3
1953	1/2 Finals	7- 3	2	0	1	+ 4	3
1954	1/4 Finals	2- 2	1	0	1	-	2
1957	1/8 Finals	1- 2	0	0	1	-	1
1958	1/2 Finals	2- 1	1	1	1	+ 1	3
1960	1/4 Finals	8- 5	2	0	2	+ 3	4
1961	1/2 Finals	17- 5	4	1	1	+12	6
1963	Winners	12- 4	7	0	1	+ 8	8
1964	1/8 Finals	1- 2	0	0	1	1	1
1965	1/8 Finals	2- 4	0	0	1	2	1
1966	1/2 Finals	16- 5	4	1	1	+11	6
1968	1/2 Finals	4- 2	2	0	1	+ 2	3
1970	1/2 Finals	16- 5	5	0	1	+11	6
1971	1/4 Finals	3- 1	1	1	0	+ 2	2
1972	1/4 Finals	5- 6	2	0	2	1	4
1973	1/8 Finals	1- 3	0	0	2	2	2
1974	1/8 Finals	2- 3	0	1	1	1	2
1975	1/8 Finals	2- 3	1	0	1	1	2
1976	Winners	12- 2	6	2	0	+10	8
1977	Winners	14- 7	5	1	2	+ 7	8
1978	1/4 Finals	3- 3	2	0	2	-	4
1979	1/4 Finals	5- 4	3	0	1	+ 1	4
1980	1/4 Finals	7- 4	2	2	0	+ 3	4
1981	1/4 Finals	5- 3	1	3	0	+ 2	4
1982	Runners-up	13- 6	5	1	2	+ 7	8
1983	Winners	12- 5	5	1	1	+ 7	7
1984	Winners	19- 7	8	0	1	+12	9
1985	1/2 Finals	8- 5	3	2	1	+ 3	6
1986	Winners	18- 8	5	3	1	+10	9
1987	1/4 Finals	8- 5	2	3	1	+ 3	6
1988	1/8 Finals	1- 2	1	0	1	1	2
1989	1/2 Finals	1- 2	4	3	2	1	9
1990	1/4 Finals	1- 2	5	1	2	1	8
1991	1/4 Finals	4- 3	5	1	3	+ 1	9
1992	1/4 Finals	3- 3	5	0	2	-	7
1993	1/8 Finals	3- 5	2	1	1	2	4
1994	Winners	15- 5	4	4	2	+10	10
1995	Runners-up	13- 5	3	3	1	+ 8	7
1996	Winners	21- 5	8	1	0	+16	9
1997	1/8 Finals	0- 1	0	0	1	1	2
1998	1/4 Finals	7- 4	2	2	1	+ 3	5
1999	Winners	12- 4	5	3	0	+ 8	8
2000	1/4 Finals	13- 2	3	3	0	+11	6
2001	Winners	35- 4	9	0	0	+31	9
2002	Winners	21- 3	8	1	0	+18	9
2003	1/2 Finals	9- 7	3	3	2	+ 2	8
2004	1/2 Finals	18- 9	6	0	2	+ 9	8
2005	Runners-up	21- 5	5	3	1	+16	9
2006	Winners	22-10	7	1	1	+12	9
2007	1/4 Finals	10- 6	3	1	2	+ 4	6
2008	Runners-up	18-12	4	3	2	+ 6	9
2009	Runners-up	15- 4	5	3	1	+11	9
2010	1/4 Finals	12-10	3	1	2	+ 2	6
2011	Winners	19- 7	5	3	1	+12	9
2012	Winners	37-11	13	3	1	+26	17
2013	1/8 Finals	6- 7	3	0	1	1	4
2014	1/8 Finals	4- 4	1	1	2	-	4
2015	1/2 Finals	16- 4	4	3	1	+12	8
2016	1/4 Finals	12- 4	5	0	1	+ 8	6
2017	Winners	21- 5	6	3	0	+16	9
2018	1/4 Finals	7-4	3	1	2	+ 3	6
2019	Runners-up	19- 9	5	1	3	+10	9
2020	Runners-up	20- 7	5	2	2	+13	9
2021	1/8 Finals	4- 2	1	0	1	+2	2
2022	1/8 Finals	11- 2	3	0	1	+9	4
**TOTAL***	**16 Cup trophies**	**931-396**	**285**	**93**	**94**	**+535**	**472**

- Appearances: 70 Seasons
- Winners: **16 Times**
- Runners-up: 10 Times
- Semi Finals: 36 Times
- Quarter Finals: 55 Times
- Ties Won: **194 Times**
- Ties Lost: 53 Times

- Data missing from few of Cup seasons, thus the correct total figures in bold differ from some of added sums on the table above.

=== All Finals results ===
Wins	Draws	Losses	Goals	+- Goals	Matches
**17**	**6**	**11**	**50-41**	**+9**	**34**

== Head-to-head ==
Opponent	Goals	Wins	Draws	Losses	+- Goals	Matches	Ties Won	Ties Lost
Partizani Tiranë	28-25	13	7	8	+ 3	28	9	7
Dinamo Tiranë	32-44	9	6	16	-12	31	7	10
KS Vllaznia	27-19	14	4	9	+ 8	27	10	6
KS Flamurtari	32-16	14	2	5	+16	21	9	4
KS Teuta	29-19	8	9	5	+10	22	6	8
KS Elbasani	40-17	11	4	4	+23	19	8	2
KS Besa	31-27	13	6	7	+ 4	26	10	4
KS Skenderbeu Korce	21- 6	10	1	1	+15	12	8	1
KS Tomori	21- 7	7	3	1	+14	11	7	-
KS Lushnja	41-15	13	4	5	+26	22	8	3
Luftëtari Gjirokastër	29- 7	8	1	0	+22	9	5	-
KS Apolonia	31-10	9	4	0	+21	13	5	1
Besëlidhja Lezhë	23- 5	7	2	1	+18	10	5	-
KS Kastrioti	44- 7	14	1	0	+37	15	7	-
KF Naftëtari Kuçovë	5- 0	2	0	0	+ 5	2	1	-
KF Laçi	16- 7	6	3	3	+ 9	12	3	2
KS Shkumbini	32- 9	9	0	0	+23	9	4	-
KS Bylis	21- 6	5	3	2	+15	10	4	-
KS Sopoti Librazhd	29- 9	4	5	1	+20	10	5	-
KS Albpetrol	19- 3	5	0	1	+16	6	3	-
KS Burreli	1- 2	1	0	1	1	2	0	1
KS Pogradeci	8- 3	2	1	0	+ 5	3	2	-
KS Kamza	9- 2	4	0	0	+ 7	4	1	-
KF Erzeni Shijak	16- 3	8	0	0	+13	8	4	-
KS Shkëndija	8- 5	2	2	0	+ 3	4	2	-
KS Turbina Cërrik	13- 3	3	1	0	+10	4	2	-
KF Memaliaj	9- 2	2	0	0	+ 7	2	1	-
KS Tërbuni Pukë	8- 3	3	1	0	+ 5	4	2	-
FK Kukesi	16-14	3	4	3	+ 2	10	2	3
KS Iliria	15- 3	4	0	0	+12	4	2	-
KF Cakrani	3- 1	1	0	1	+ 2	2	1	-
KS Butrinti Sarandë	6- 4	1	1	0	+ 2	2	1	-
KS Ada Velipojë	5- 2	1	1	0	+ 3	2	1	-
KF Skrapari	5- 0	2	0	0	+ 5	2	1	-
Luzi 2008	4- 3	1	0	1	+ 1	2	1	-
Dinamo Shkodër	3- 0	1	0	0	+ 3	1	1	-
Garnizoni Durrës	4- 0	1	0	0	+ 4	1	1	-
Albanët	3- 0	1	0	0	+ 3	1	1	-
SK Himarë	10- 1	2	0	0	+ 9	2	1	-
KF Shënkolli	5- 1	1	1	0	+ 4	2	1	-
KF Korabi	0- 1	0	0	1	1	1	0	1
**42 opponents***	**695-308**	**225**	**72**	**76**	**+387**	**373**	194	**53**

- Data missing from few of Cup seasons, thus the correct total figures in bold differ from some of added sums on the table above.
- Last updated: 70th Cup

== Recent seasons ==
Season	Season ended	Goals	Wins	Draws	Losses	+/-Goals	Matches	Ties Won	Ties Lost
1999	Winners	12- 4	5	3	0	+ 8	8	5	-
2000	1/4 Finals	13- 2	3	3	0	+11	6	2	1
2001	Winners	35- 4	9	0	0	+31	9	5	-
2002	Winners	21- 3	8	1	0	+18	9	5	-
2003	1/2 Finals	9- 7	3	3	2	+ 2	8	3	1
2004	1/2 Finals	18- 9	6	0	2	+ 9	8	3	1
2005	Runners-up	21- 5	5	3	1	+16	9	4	1
2006	Winners	22-10	7	1	1	+12	9	5	-
2007	1/4 Finals	10- 6	3	1	2	+ 4	6	2	1
2008	Runners-up	18-12	4	3	2	+ 6	9	4	1
2009	Runners-up	15- 4	5	3	1	+11	9	4	1
2010	1/4 Finals	12-10	3	1	2	+ 2	6	2	1
2011	Winners	19- 7	5	3	1	+12	9	5	-
2012	Winners	37-11	13	3	1	+26	17	5	-
2013	1/8 Finals	6- 7	3	0	1	1	4	1	1
2014	1/8 Finals	4- 4	1	1	2	-	4	1	1
2015	1/2 Finals	16- 4	4	3	1	+12	8	3	1
2016	1/4 Finals	12- 4	5	0	1	+ 8	6	2	1
2017	Winners	21- 5	6	3	0	+16	9	5	-
2018	1/4 Finals	7-4	3	1	2	+3	6	2	1
2019	Runners-up	19- 9	5	1	3	+10	9	4	1
2020	Runners-up	20- 7	5	2	2	+13	9	4	1
2021	1/8 Finals	4- 2	1	0	1	+2	2	1	1
2022	1/8 Finals	11- 2	3	0	1	+9	4		
Total	7 Cup trophies	382-142	115	39	29	+240	183	77	17

== Also look ==
KF Tirana Statistics in Albanian Superliga
