= FK Jehona =

Albanian football club

FL Jehona
- Full name: Klubi i Futbollit Jehona Kozare
- Founded: 2005; 21 years ago
- Ground: Fusha Sportive Kozare

FK Jehona is an Albanian professional football club based in Kozare. They last competed in the Albanian Third Division.
