= New Sukth Stadium =

Stadium in Sukth, Albania

- Sukthi KF
- Location: Sukth, Durrës, Albania
- Owner: KF Sukthi
- Operator: Municipal
- Capacity: 1,000
- Surface: Grass
- Field size: 130 m × 55 m (427 ft × 180 ft)

Construction
- Opened: 12 March 2009; 17 years ago
- Renovated: 2015
- Cost: 30,000 euros
- Architect: Leonard Duka

Tenant
- FK Sukthi

New Sukth Stadium (Albanian: Stadiumi Sukthi i Ri) is a multi-use stadium in Sukth, Durrës, Albania. The stadium has a seated capacity of 1,000 spectators and is the current home of FK Sukthi.

For some years, the stadium consisted of basic parkland. An initiative from the local municipal and football players brought the stadium up to modern standards.
