= KF Pirust =

Albanian football club

- Full name: Klubi i Futbollit Pirust
- Founded: 2019; 6 years ago
- Ground: Kamza Sports Complex
- 2020: Kategoria e Tretë, 7th

KF Pirust is an Albanian professional football club based in Tirana. They are currently not competing in any senior football league.
