= Shkëndija Durrës =

Albanian football club

- Full name: Shkëndija Durrës
- Founded: 1970; 55 years ago
- Ground: Bernardina Qerraxhia Sports Complex
- Capacity: 500

Shkëndija Durrës is an Albanian sports club based in Durrës, Albania. Its men's football team recently competed in the Albanian Third Division and the women's team has competed at the Albanian Women's National Championship as recently as 2015. Their home ground is the Bernardina Qerraxhia Sports Complex.
