= KF Sopoti B =

Albanian football club

- Full name: Klubi i Futbollit Sopoti B
- Owner: Bashkia Librazhd
- League: Kategoria e Tretë
Home colours	Away colours

KF Sopoti B is an Albanian football club based in the town of Librazhd. They are currently competing in the Albanian Third Division.
