= KF Fushmbret =

Albanian football club

Fushmbret
- Full name: Klubi i Futbollit Fushmbret
- Founded: 2005; 20 years ago
- League: Kategoria e Tretë
- 2014–15: Kategoria e Tretë, Group B, 6th

KF Fushmbret were an Albanian professional football club based in Elbasan. They last competed in Kategoria e Tretë during the 2014–15 season, finishing sixth in Group B.

== History ==
In 1999, Durim Sadiku, father of Albania national team player Armando Sadiku, founded an amateur youth football team in Fushë Mbret, a neighbourhood on the outskirts of Elbasan. Initially created to promote the game of football among the local youth, the initiative laid the groundwork for a formal club.

Six years later, in 2005, the project evolved into a professional team known as "Shoqata Sportive Fushmbret". After years of preparation and growth, the club officially debuted in Kategoria e Tretë, the fourth tier of Albanian football, during the 2013–14 season.

== Notable players ==
- (Albania) Kledis Hida
- (Albania) Arsen Lleshi
- (Albania) Armando Sadiku
