= KF Golemi =

Albanian football club

- Founded: 14 October 2013; 11 years ago
- Ground: Fusha Sportive Golem
Home colours	Away colours

KF Golemi is an Albanian football (soccer) club based in Golem, Kavajë. The club is currently not competing in the senior football league.

== History ==
Golemi FC was established on October 14, 2013, thanks to the initiative of the local government and mayor Agron Agalliu.

== See also ==
- Besa Kavajë
- Luzi United
- FK Egnatia
