= 2017–18 Flamurtari FC season =

Flamurtari Vlorë
2017–18 season
- Chairman: Sinan Idrizi
- Manager: Shpëtim Duro (until 18 April 2018); Ardian Behari (from 21 April 2018)
- Stadium: Flamurtari Stadium
- Kategoria Superiore: 6th
- Albanian Cup: Semi-finals
Home colours	Away colours	Third colours

This article covers the 2017–18 season for Flamurtari Vlorë. They participate in the Kategoria Superiore and the Albanian Cup.

== Current squad ==
As of 18 October 2017

Note: Flags indicate national team as defined under FIFA eligibility rules; some limited exceptions apply. Players may hold more than one non-FIFA nationality.

No.	Pos.	Nation	Player
1	GK	KOS	Adis Nurković
6	DF	MKD	Fisnik Zuka
7	FW	ALB	Ardit Hoxhaj
8	DF	MKD	Artim Položani
9	FW	CRO	Tomislav Bušić
10	MF	BRA	Victor Juffo
11	DF	ALB	Franc Veliu
12	GK	ALB	Edmir Sali
14	FW	ALB	Xhuljo Tushi
15	DF	ALB	Ditmar Bicaj
17	FW	GUI	Sekou Camara

No.	Pos.	Nation	Player
19	FW	SEN	Mamadou Tounkara
21	FW	SRB	Igor Nedeljković
22	MF	MKD	Muhamed Useini
24	MF	GUI	Lancinet Sidibe
25	MF	ALB	Fjoralb Deliaj
29	DF	ALB	Emiljano Musta
30	FW	MKD	Muarem Muarem
31	DF	MKD	Goran Siljanovski
33	GK	ALB	Pano Qirko
97	MF	ALB	Alessio Hyseni
99	FW	BRA	Danilo Almeida Alves

== Competitions ==
=== Kategoria Superiore ===
==== League table ====
Pos	Team	Pld	W	D	L	GF	GA	GD	Pts	Qualification or relegation
4	Laçi	36	16	8	12	45	39	+6	56	Qualification to the Europa League first qualifying round (Note: Skënderbeu qualified for the Europa League first qualifying round by winning the 2017–18 Albanian Cup. However, since they were banned from entering UEFA competitions, the spot awarded to the cup winners was passed down the league.)
5	Partizani	36	15	8	13	41	36	+5	53	Qualification to the Europa League first qualifying round
6	Flamurtari	36	11	13	12	37	37	0	46	
7	Kamza	36	12	10	14	37	41	−4	46	
8	Teuta	36	12	10	14	55	58	−3	46	

Source: Albanian Football Association (in Albanian), Soccerway
Rules for classification: 1) Points; 2) Head-to-head points; 3) Head-to-head goal difference; 4) Head-to-head goals scored; 5) Goal difference; 6) Goals scored; 7) Draw.

==== Results summary ====
Overall								Home						Away					
Pld	W	D	L	GF	GA	GD	Pts	W	D	L	GF	GA	GD	W	D	L	GF	GA	GD
36	11	13	12	37	37	0	46	6	7	5	19	16	+3	5	6	7	18	21	−3

Last updated: 23 May 2018.

==== Results by round ====
Round	1	2	3	4	5	6	7	8	9	10	11	12	13	14	15	16	17	18	19	20	21	22	23	24	25	26	27	28	29	30	31	32	33	34	35	36
Ground	A	H	A	H	A	A	H	A	H	H	A	H	A	H	H	A	H	A	A	H	A	H	A	A	H	A	H	H	A	H	A	H	H	A	H	A
Result	L	W	W	D	D	D	W	W	D	D	W	D	D	W	L	W	W	D	L	W	D	L	L	L	D	L	L	L	W	W	L	D	D	L	L	D
Position	8	7	3	2	3	3	3	3	3	3	2	3	4	2	3	2	2	2	2	2	2	3	3	4	5	6	6	6	6	6	6	6	6	6	6	6

Source: Soccerway
A = Away; H = Home; W = Win; D = Draw; L = Loss

==== Matches ====
1st quarter:

Skënderbeu 2-0 Flamurtari

Flamurtari 3-1 Lushnja

Teuta 1-2 Flamurtari

Flamurtari 0-0 Luftëtari

Vllaznia 1-1 Flamurtari

Laçi 1-1 Flamurtari

Flamurtari 1-0 Kamza

Partizani 0-1 Flamurtari

Flamurtari 1-1 Kukësi

2nd quarter:

Flamurtari 1-1 Skënderbeu

Lushnja 0-1 Flamurtari

Flamurtari 0-0 Teuta

Luftëtari 1-1 Flamurtari

Flamurtari 2-0 Vllaznia

Flamurtari 0-1 Laçi

Kamza 0-3 Flamurtari

Flamurtari 1-0 Partizani

Kukësi 1-1 Flamurtari

3rd quarter:

Skënderbeu 1-0 Flamurtari

Flamurtari 2-0 Lushnja

Teuta 0-0 Flamurtari

Flamurtari 0-1 Luftëtari

Vllaznia 3-0 Flamurtari

Laçi 4-2 Flamurtari

Flamurtari 2-2 Kamza

Partizani 1-0 Flamurtari

Flamurtari 1-2 Kukësi

4th quarter:

Flamurtari 0-3 Skënderbeu

Lushnja 0-2 Flamurtari

Flamurtari 3-1 Teuta

Luftëtari 2-1 Flamurtari

Flamurtari 1-1 Vllaznia

Flamurtari 0-0 Laçi

Kamza 1-0 Flamurtari

Flamurtari 1-2 Partizani

Kukësi 2-2 Flamurtari

=== Albanian Cup ===
First round

Dinamo Tirana 0-2 Flamurtari

Flamurtari 4-1 Dinamo Tirana

Aggregate: Dinamo 1-6 Flamurtari

Second round

Turbina 1-6 Flamurtari

Flamurtari 5-2 Turbina

Aggregate: Turbina 3-11 Flamurtari

Quarter-finals

Flamurtari 1-0 Partizani

Partizani 2-1 Flamurtari

Aggregate: Flamurtari 2-2 (a) Partizani

Semi-Finals

Skënderbeu 0-1 Flamurtari

Flamurtari 0-2 Skënderbeu

Aggregate: Flamurtari 1-2 Skënderbeu
