= KF Djelmnia Shkodrane =

Albanian football club

- Full name: Klubi i Futbollit Djelmnia Shkodrane
- Founded: 2010; 15 years ago
- Ground: Fusha Sportive Shkodër
- Manager: Gjovalin Stolaj
- League: Kategoria e Tretë

KF Djelmnia Shkodrane is an Albanian professional football club based in Shkodër. They last competed in the Albanian Third Division.
