= FK Sukthi =

Albanian football club

- Full name: Futboll Klub Sukthi
- Founded: 10 July 2009; 17 years ago
- Ground: New Sukth Stadium
- Capacity: 1,000
- Owner: Njësia Administrative Sukth
- President: Albert Muharremi
- Manager: Odise Soko
Home colours	Away colours

Klubi i Futbollit Sukthi, commonly referred to as FK Sukthi is an Albanian professional football club founded on 10 July 2009, based in Sukth. Together with Teuta Durrës and KF Erzeni Shijak they form the trio of football teams from Durrës that compete in country's four divisions. The club's home ground is New Sukth Stadium, which has a seated capacity of 1,000.

== List of managers ==
This is a chronological list of the managers who have guided FK Sukthi since 2009.

1. (Albania) Xhevair Kapllani (2009–2013)
2. (Albania) Eduard Curri (2013–2015)
3. (Albania) Ismail Çira (2015)
4. (Albania) Odise Soko (2015–)
