= Internacionale Tirana FC =

Albanian football club

- Nickname(s): Inter Tirana
- Founded: 1 March 2013; 12 years ago
- Ground: National Sports Centre; Kamëz, Tirana
- Capacity: 500
- Manager: Mirjet Vllacaj
- 2018: Albanian Third Division, 3rd
Home colours	Away colours

Internacionale Tirana FC is an Albanian football club based in Tirana. Part of the International University of Tirana, it is currently not competing in the senior football league.
