= KF Domozdova =

Albanian football club

- Full name: Klubi i Futbollit Domozdova Prrenjas
- Founded: 1979; 46 years ago
- Dissolved: 2018; 7 years ago
- Ground: Stadiumi Domozdova
- Capacity: 1,000
- 2017–18: Kategoria e Dytë, Group B, 14th (relegated)

KF Domozdova was an Albanian football club based in the small town of Prrenjas.
