= Kozare, Albania =

Kozare
- Administrative unit
- Location within Albania
- Coordinates: 40°50′N 19°54′E
- Country: Albania
- County: Berat
- Municipality: Kuçovë

Population (2011)
  - Administrative unit: 5,622
- Time zone: UTC+1 (CET)
  - Summer (DST): UTC+2 (CEST)

Kozare is a village and a former municipality in Berat County, central Albania. With the 2015 local government reform, it became a subdivision of the municipality of Kuçovë. The population at the 2011 census was 5,622.
