= KF Kevitan =

Albanian football club

- Founded: 12 July 2014; 10 years ago
- Ground: Kevitan Complex
- Capacity: 500
- President: Artan Singa
- 2018–19: Albanian Second Division, Group A, 13th (withdrew)
Home colours	Away colours

KF Kevitan is an Albanian football club based in Tirana. The club was founded on 12 July 2014 and is currently not competing in any football league, after withdrawing from the Albanian Second Division in the 2018–19 season.

== History ==
In the 2014–15 season, the club was won its first ever trophy after defeating FC Internacional Tirana 2–1 in the Albanian Third Division championship final.

== Top goalscorers ==
Competitive, professional matches only. Matches played (including as substitute) appear in brackets.

Top goalscorers for FC Kevitan
No.	Name	Years	League	Albanian Cup	Total
1	(Albania) Vilson Mziu	2014–	47 (21)	0 (0)	47 (21)
2	(Albania) Ergert Azizi	2014–	39 (21)	0 (0)	39 (21)
3	(Albania) Arnold Hyseni	2014–	12 (21)	0 (0)	12 (21)
4	(Albania) Alvaro Farruku	2014–	11 (19)	0 (0)	11 (19)
5	(Albania) Alban Mehmeti	2014–	10 (20)	0 (0)	10 (20)
6	(Albania) Aldi Pjetri	2014–	8 (20)	0 (0)	8 (20)
7	(Albania) Donald Saliaj	2014–	7 (17)	0 (0)	7 (17)
8	(Albania) Ermal Marku	2014–	6 (20)	0 (0)	6 (20)
9	(Albania) Emirjon Hajdari	2014–	5 (18)	0 (0)	5 (18)
10	(Albania) Eridon Vataj	2014–	5 (18)	0 (0)	5 (18)

== Managers ==
Name	Nat	From	To	Record				
Name	Nat	From	To	P	W	D	L	Win %
Mark Vataj	(Albania)	August 2014	Present	22	22	0	0	100%

== Sponsorship ==
- Main sponsor: Kevitan Group Albania
- Main sponsor: Kevitan Security & Communications UK
- Official shirt manufacturer: Adidas
- Official sponsor: Alumil
- Official sponsor: FlyTech
- Official sponsor: Kevitan Group
- Official sponsor: SuperSport News
- Official sponsor: Wee Albania
- Official sponsor: Flytech
- Official sponsor: KrikKrak
- Official sponsor: FreeFlow Yoga Tirana
- Official sponsor: Pikark.al'

=== Shirt sponsors and manufacturers ===
FC Kevitan League Sponsors
Period	Kit Manufacturer	Shirt Sponsor	
2014–15	Macron	Alumil	FlyTech

=== Works cited ===
- Pead, Brian (1986). Liverpool A Complete Record. Breedon Books. ISBN 0-907969-15-1.
