= Internacional Complex =

Football training facility in Tiranë, Albania

- Interactive map of Internacional Complex
- Full name: Kompleksi Internacional
- Location: Pezë Helmës, Tiranë, Albania
- Coordinates: 41°16′08.8″N 19°42′01.0″E
- Owner: Internacional Tirana
- Operator: Internacional Tirana
- Capacity: 1,000 (Pezë Helmës Stadium); 500 (Pezë Helmës Stadium II)
- Type: Sports facility

Construction
- Groundbreaking: 2013
- Opened: August 2014; 12 years ago

Tenants
- Internacional Tirana (2016–); Prestige (2022–)

Internacional Complex (Albanian: Kompleksi Internacional) is a football training facility located in Pezë Helmës, Tiranë, Albania. The complex consists of two football stadiums, the 1,000 seater Pezë Helmës Stadium and the 500 seater Pezë Helmës Stadium II. It is opened and operated by Internacional Tirana, and some Albanian football clubs use the facility for training such as Kukësi and Partizani. Many lower league sides use the facility to host games, as both stadiums meet the licensing requirements to host games up to the Albanian First Division.
