= KF Selenica =

Albanian football club

- Full name: Klubi Sportiv Selenicë
- Founded: 1930; 96 years ago as KS 21 Shkurti Selenicë
- Dissolved: 2020
- Ground: Selenicë Stadium
- Capacity: 4,000
- 2019–20: Kategoria e Dytë, Group B, 13th (relegated)

KF Selenica were an Albanian football club based in Selenicë. Founded in 1930 as "21 Shkurti", the club spent most of its history competing in the lower tiers of Albanian football, although it briefly played in the top division during the 1991–92 season.

Its home matches were held at Selenicë Stadium, which has a capacity of approximately 4,000 spectators. Following relegation from Kategoria e Dytë in 2020, the club ceased operations.

== History ==
The club was established in 1930 under the name "21 Shkurti" and initially competed in regional amateur competitions. It first entered a national tournament in the 1949 Albanian Second Division as SK Selenicë, participating in a group-stage competition that featured numerous clubs from across the country. The team returned the following season but was eliminated in the opening round.

In 1951, the club was renamed "Puna Selenicë", reflecting the state’s policy of assigning ideologically inspired names to sports organizations. For much of the following decades, the team remained a regular participant in the lower divisions. Its greatest domestic success came in the 1990–91 season when it finished as runners-up of Kategoria e Parë, earning promotion to the top league.

KF Selenica made its debut in the 1991–92 Albanian National Championship under manager Sotir Seferaj, reaching the quarter-finals of the Albanian Cup.

Financial difficulties led to the club’s dissolution in 1997. It was re-established in 2019 as KF Selenica and entered Kategoria e Tretë, winning the division in its first season to secure promotion. However, after finishing at the bottom of its Kategoria e Dytë group in the 2019–20 season, the club was relegated and subsequently dissolved in 2020.

== Honours ==
- Kategoria e Parë:
  - Runners-up (1): 1990–91
- (Albania) Kategoria e Tretë:
  - Champions (1): 2019
