= KF Divjaka =

Albanian football club

- Full name: Klubi i Futbollit Divjaka
- Founded: 1960; 66 years ago
- Ground: Fusha Sportive Divjakë

KF Divjaka is an Albanian professional football club based in Divjakë. They are currently not competing in any senior league but have previously competed in the Kategoria e Tretë.
