= Sukth =

- Administrative unit
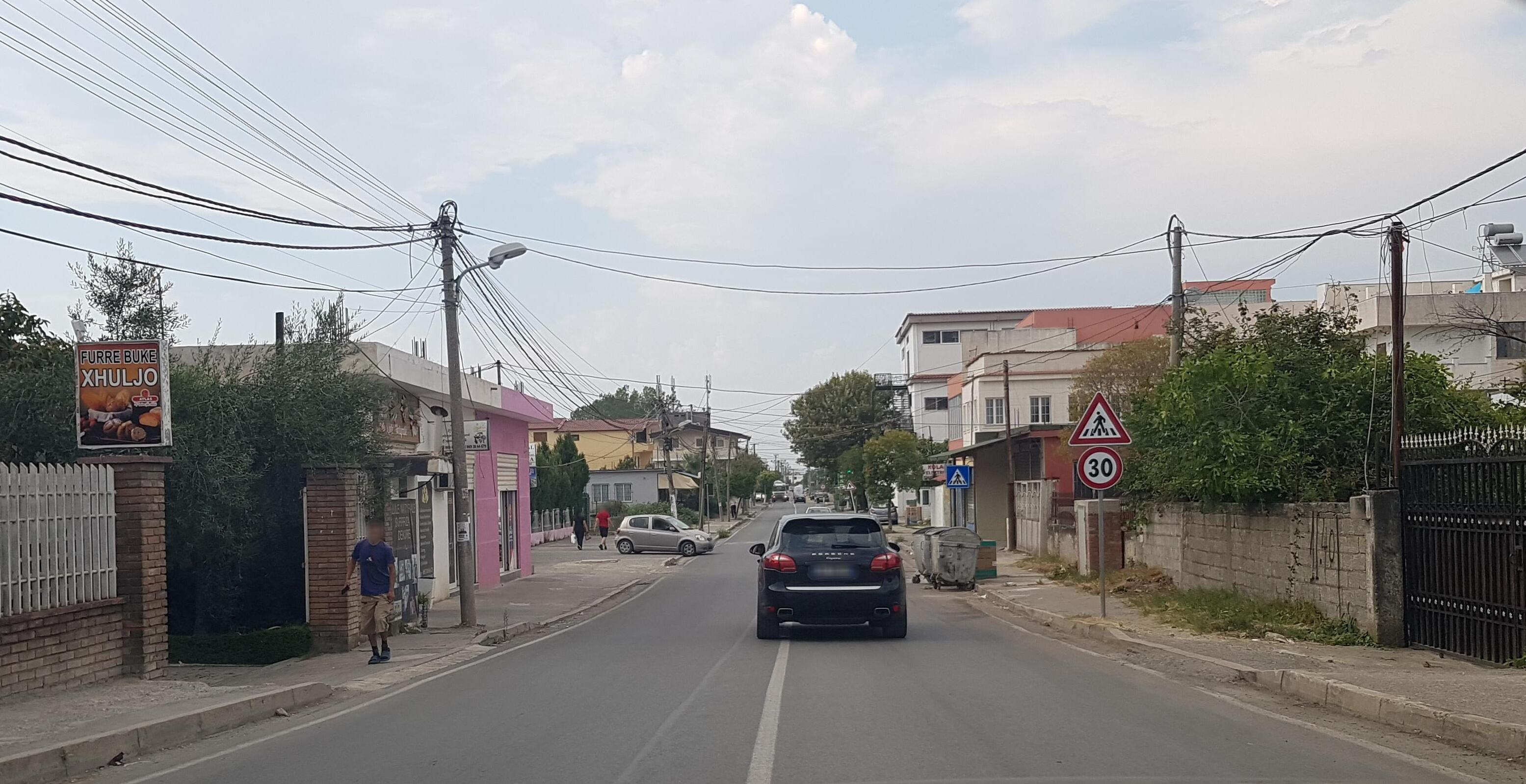
- The main road in Sukth i Ri

- Location within Albania
- Coordinates: 41°23′N 19°32′E
- Country: Albania
- County: Durrës
- Municipality: Durrës
  - Administrative unit: 57 km^{2} (22 sq mi)
- Elevation: 12 m (39 ft)

Population (2023)
  - Administrative unit: 13,395
  - Administrative unit density: 240/km^{2} (610/sq mi)
- Time zone: UTC+1 (CET)
  - Summer (DST): UTC+2 (CEST)
- Postal Code: 2010
- Area Code: (0)573

Sukth is a town (commune) and a former municipality in the Durrës County, western Albania. At the 2015 local government reform it became a subdivision of the municipality Durrës. The population at the 2011 census was 15,966.

Historical population
Year	Pop.	±%
1989	9,582	—
2001	13,093	+36.6%
2011	15,966	+21.9%
2023	13,395	−16.1%

The town is divided by the Erzen river is into two districts, namely in Sukth i Ri and Sukth i vjeter. Sukth is located about three kilometres north of the historic market town of Shijak. The Adriatic Sea is only seven kilometres away.

Sukth municipality consisted of Sukth, Hamallaj, Kulla, Perlat, Vadardha and Rrushkull villages. The last mayor was Sherif Fortuzi.

== Sport ==
The local football club is FK Sukthi.

== Notable people ==
Below are notable personalities born in Sukth or that spent most of their lives in Sukth:

- Noizy, singer, rapper
- Florenc Arapi, football player
