= FC Internacional Tirana =

Albanian football club

- Full name: Futbollklub Internacional Tirana
- Founded: August 2014; 10 years ago
- Ground: Internacional Complex
- Capacity: 2,500
- Chairman: Ervin Canollari
- Manager: Popi Bonici
- League: Kategoria e Tretë
- 2021–22: Kategoria e Dytë, Group A, 12th (relegated)
Home colours	Away colours

FC Internacional Tirana is an Albanian football club based in Pezë Helmës, Tirana County. The club was created in August 2014 as a private academy by Ervin Canollari who was the sole investor in the club. They play their home games at the Internacional Complex.

== History ==
The club was originally formed as a football academy by a sole investor Ervin Canollari, who had planned to build a state of the art academy by 2014 to develop youth players. Originally wanting to focus on only youth football, Canollari decided to create a senior team to represent the academy in national competitions, so within 40 days he created FC Internacional Tirana and registered for the club to compete in the 2014-15 Albanian Third Division. A former head coach of KF Butrinti Sarandë and KF Albpetrol was appointed as the club's first manager and in September 2014, just before the start of the Albanian Third Division season, the club held open try outs where young players who were left without a club after leaving other youth teams in Albania participated. These players were mainly from the established teams in the Tirana district.

On 10 March 2015, the club signed a co-operation agreement with Italian side Udinese, who were to help develop young players in the academy through coaching and guidance from the Italian club.

== Managers ==
Name	Nat	From	To	Record				
Name	Nat	From	To	P	W	D	L	Win %
Popi Bonici	(Italy)	May 2009	Present	10	8	1	1	80%
