= 2025 UEFA European Under-19 Championship qualification =

Tournament details
- Dates: Qualifying round: 9 October – 19 November 2024; Elite round: 19 – 25 March 2025
- Teams: 53 (from 1 confederation)

Tournament statistics
- Matches played: 120
- Goals scored: 342 (2.85 per match)
- Top scorer(s): (Poland) Daniel Mikołajewski (6 goals)
- All statistics correct as of 25 March 2025.

The 2025 UEFA European Under-19 Championship qualification was a men's under-19 national football team competition that determined the seven teams joining the automatically qualified hosts Romania in the 2025 UEFA European Under-19 Championship final tournament. Players born on or after 1 January 2006 are eligible to participate.

Russia was excluded from participating in the tournament due to the ongoing invasion of Ukraine. Therefore, excluding hosts Romania, 53 teams entered this qualification competition, which consists of a qualifying round played in October–November 2024, followed by an elite round played in spring 2025.

== Format ==
The qualifying competition consisted of the following two rounds:

- Qualifying Round: Apart from Portugal, which receives a bye to the elite round as the team with the highest seeding coefficient, the remaining 52 teams were drawn into 13 groups of four teams. Each group was played in single round-robin format at one of the teams selected as hosts after the draw. The 13 group winners, 13 runners-up, and the best third-placed team advanced to the elite round.
- Elite Round: The 28 teams were drawn into seven groups of four teams. Each group was played in single round-robin format at one of the teams selected as hosts after the draw. The seven group winners qualified for the final tournament.

=== Tiebreakers ===
In the qualifying and elite round, teams are ranked according to points (3 points for a win, 1 point for a draw, 0 points for a loss), and if tied on points, the following tiebreaking criteria are applied, in the order given, to determine the rankings (Regulations Articles 14.01 and 14.02):

1. Points in head to head matches among tied teams
2. Goal difference in head to head matches among tied teams
3. Goals scored in head to head matches among tied teams
4. If more than two teams are tied, and after applying all head-to-head criteria above, a subset of teams are still tied, all head-to-head criteria above are reapplied exclusively to this subset of teams
5. Goal difference in all group matches
6. Goals scored in all group matches
7. Penalty shoot-out if only two teams have the same number of points, and they met in the last round of the group and are tied after applying all criteria above (not used if more than two teams have the same number of points, or if their rankings are not relevant for qualification for the next stage)
8. Disciplinary points (red card = 3 points, yellow card = 1 point, expulsion for 2 yellow cards in one match = 3 points)
9. UEFA coefficient ranking for the qualifying round draw

To determine the best third-placed team from the qualifying round, the results against the teams in fourth place are discarded. The following criteria are applied (Regulations Articles 15.01 and 15.02):

1. Points
2. Goal difference
3. Goals scored
4. Disciplinary points (total 3 matches)
5. UEFA coefficient ranking for the qualifying round draw

== Qualifying round ==
=== Draw ===
The draw for the qualifying round was held on 3 May 2024, at the UEFA headquarters in Nyon, Switzerland.

The teams were seeded according to their coefficient ranking, calculated based on the following:

- 2018 UEFA European Under-19 Championship final tournament and qualifying competition (qualifying round and elite round)
- 2019 UEFA European Under-19 Championship final tournament and qualifying competition (qualifying round and elite round)
- 2022 UEFA European Under-19 Championship final tournament and qualifying competition (qualifying round and elite round)
- 2023 UEFA European Under-19 Championship final tournament and qualifying competition (qualifying round and elite round)

Each group contains one team from Pot A, one team from Pot B, one team from Pot C, and one team from Pot D. Based on the decisions taken by the UEFA Emergency Panel, the following pairs of teams could not be drawn in the same group: Spain and Gibraltar, Belarus and Ukraine, Kosovo and Serbia, Kosovo and Bosnia & Herzegovina.

Final tournament hosts: Team / Coeff. / Rank; Romania / 12.500 / —	Bye to elite round: Team / Coeff. / Rank; Portugal / 27.167 / 1

Teams entering qualifying round

Pot A
Team	Coeff.	Rank
Italy	26.778	2
France	23.167	3
England	20.056	4
Spain	19.939	5
Norway	17.833	6
Ukraine	15.056	7
Republic of Ireland	14.944	8
Israel	13.889	9
Czech Republic	13.722	10
Serbia	12.333	11
Turkey	11.778	12
Germany	11.667	13
Slovakia	11.167	14

Pot B
Team	Coeff.	Rank
Denmark	11.100	15
Greece	11.000	16
Poland	10.667	17
Belgium	10.233	18
Netherlands	10.000	19
Iceland	9.667	20
Austria	9.667	21
Hungary	9.500	22
Croatia	8.500	23
Scotland	8.500	24
Finland	8.167	25
Sweden	7.333	26
Latvia	7.000	27

Pot C
Team	Coeff.	Rank
Slovenia	6.617	28
Bosnia and Herzegovina	6.167	29
Armenia	6.000	30
Switzerland	5.500	31
North Macedonia	5.333	32
Bulgaria	5.167	33
Georgia	4.833	34
Wales	4.667	35
Northern Ireland	4.500	36
Malta	4.333	37
Cyprus	3.833	38
Kosovo	3.500	39
Azerbaijan	3.500	40

Pot D
Team	Coeff.	Rank
Montenegro	3.333	41
Belarus	3.333	42
Luxembourg	2.667	43
Estonia	2.333	44
Moldova	1.667	45
Kazakhstan	1.667	46
Albania	1.333	47
Lithuania	0.667	48
Faroe Islands	0.333	49
Andorra	0.333	50
San Marino	0.000	51
Gibraltar	0.000	52
Liechtenstein	0.000	53

=== Groups ===
==== Group 1 ====
Pos	Team	Pld	W	D	L	GF	GA	GD	Pts	Qualification
1	Netherlands (H)	3	3	0	0	5	0	+5	9	Elite round
2	Slovenia	3	2	0	1	3	3	0	6	Elite round
3	Kazakhstan	3	1	0	2	3	5	−2	3	
4	Ukraine	3	0	0	3	1	4	−3	0	

Source: UEFA
Rules for classification: Tiebreakers
(H) Hosts
13 November 2024
19:00

Ukraine	1–2	Kazakhstan
Ponomarenko 62' (pen.)	Report	Agimanov 10', 35'

Sportpark Marsdijk, Assen
Referee: Ante Čulina (Croatia)
13 November 2024
19:00

Slovenia	0–2	Netherlands
	Report	Topalović 69' (o.g.); Redmond 82'

De Langeleegte, Veendam
Referee: Jakob Sundberg (Denmark)

16 November 2024
12:00

Ukraine	0–1	Slovenia
	Report	Pejičiċ 49'

De Langeleegte, Veendam
Referee: Radoslav Gidzhenov (Bulgaria)
16 November 2024
16:00

Netherlands	2–0	Kazakhstan
Konadu 3' (pen.); Read 53'	Report

Sportpark Marsdijk, Assen
Referee: Ante Čulina (Croatia)

19 November 2024
19:00

Netherlands	1–0	Ukraine
Sliti 39'	Report

De Langeleegte, Veendam
Referee: Jakob Sundberg (Denmark)
19 November 2024
19:00

Kazakhstan	1–2	Slovenia
Sarsenbayev 77'	Report	Topalović 21', 48'

Sportpark Marsdijk, Assen
Referee: Radoslav Gidzhenov (Bulgaria)

==== Group 2 ====
Pos	Team	Pld	W	D	L	GF	GA	GD	Pts	Qualification
1	Germany	3	3	0	0	7	2	+5	9	Elite round
2	Hungary	3	2	0	1	5	3	+2	6	Elite round
3	Cyprus	3	1	0	2	3	6	−3	3	
4	Andorra (H)	3	0	0	3	0	4	−4	0	

Source: UEFA
Rules for classification: Tiebreakers
(H) Hosts
12 November 2024
15:00

Cyprus	1–3	Hungary
Tzouliou 45+5'	Report	Németh 21'; Vidnyánszky 51'; Varga 65'

Centre d’Entrenament FAF, Andorra la Vella
Referee: Amine Kourgheli (Belarus)
12 November 2024
19:00

Germany	2–0	Andorra
Ramsak 8'; Brunner 55' (pen.)	Report

Centre d’Entrenament FAF, Andorra la Vella
Referee: Sayat Karabayev (Kazakhstan)

15 November 2024
15:00

Germany	3–1	Cyprus
Brunner 29' (pen.), 57'; Darvich 38' (pen.)	Report	Poursaitides 72'

Centre d’Entrenament FAF, Andorra la Vella
Referee: Jamie Robinson (Northern Ireland)
15 November 2024
19:00

Hungary	1–0	Andorra
Németh 82'	Report

Centre d’Entrenament FAF, Andorra la Vella
Referee: Sayat Karabayev (Kazakhstan)

18 November 2024
19:00

Hungary	1–2	Germany
Simon 44' (pen.)	Report	Ramsak 75'; Brunner 78'

Centre d’Entrenament FAF, Andorra la Vella
Referee: Amine Kourgheli (Belarus)
18 November 2024
19:00

Andorra	0–1	Cyprus
	Report	Nikolaou 7'

Estadi Nacional, Andorra la Vella
Referee: Jamie Robinson (Northern Ireland)

==== Group 3 ====
Pos	Team	Pld	W	D	L	GF	GA	GD	Pts	Qualification
1	England	3	2	1	0	3	1	+2	7	Elite round
2	Belgium	3	1	2	0	5	2	+3	5	Elite round
3	Bulgaria (H)	3	1	1	1	4	3	+1	4	
4	Lithuania	3	0	0	3	1	7	−6	0	

Source: UEFA
Rules for classification: Tiebreakers
(H) Hosts
13 November 2024
12:00

England	1–0	Lithuania
Nwaneri 7'	Report

Stadion Beroe, Stara Zagora
Referee: Viktor Kopiievskyi (Ukraine)
13 November 2024
13:30

Bulgaria	1–1	Belgium
Gigov 16'	Report	Furo 84'

Stadion Lokomotiv, Plovdiv
Referee: Sander van der Eijk (The Netherlands)

16 November 2024
12:00

Belgium	4–1	Lithuania
Mirisola 4'; De Meyer 61'; Furo 76'; Goemaere 89'	Report	Jančauskas 63'

Stadion Beroe, Stara Zagora
Referee: Antoni Bandić (Bosnia and Herzegovina)
16 November 2024
13:30

England	2–1	Bulgaria
Nwaneri 27'; Orford 45+1'	Report	Raychev 5'

Stadion Lokomotiv, Plovdiv
Referee: Viktor Kopiievskyi (Ukraine)

19 November 2024
13:00

Belgium	0–0	England
	Report

Stadion Lokomotiv, Plovdiv
Referee: Sander van der Eijk (The Netherlands)
19 November 2024
14:00

Lithuania	0–2	Bulgaria
	Report	Gigov 29', 55'

Stadion Beroe, Stara Zagora
Referee: Antoni Bandić (Bosnia and Herzegovina)

==== Group 4 ====
Pos	Team	Pld	W	D	L	GF	GA	GD	Pts	Qualification
1	Poland (H)	3	3	0	0	13	0	+13	9	Elite round
2	Turkey	3	2	0	1	9	3	+6	6	Elite round
3	Malta	3	1	0	2	2	9	−7	3	
4	Gibraltar	3	0	0	3	1	13	−12	0	

Source: UEFA
Rules for classification: Tiebreakers
(H) Hosts
9 October 2024
12:00

Turkey	7–0	Gibraltar
Akçiçek 14'; Dilek 24', 48'; Vural 37'; Gürpüz 46', 55'; Usluoğlu 69'	Report

Grzegorz Lato Municipal Stadium, Mielec
Referee: Miloš Gigovic (Bosnia and Herzegovina)
9 October 2024
18:00

Malta	0–6	Poland
	Report	Mikołajewski 30', 45', 62'; Orlikowski 59'; Rybak 82'; Nowakowski 85'

Grzegorz Lato Municipal Stadium, Mielec
Referee: Granit Maqedonci (Sweden)

12 October 2024
12:00

Turkey	2–0	Malta
Avcı 49'; Gürpüz 54'	Report

Stal Stalowa Wola, Stalowa Wola
Referee: Jasper Vergoote (Belgium)
12 October 2024
18:00

Poland	4–0	Gibraltar
Szala 10'; Nowakowski 33'; Kądziołka 53'; Paryzek 76'	Report

Stal Stalowa Wola, Stalowa Wola
Referee: Miloš Gigovic (Bosnia and Herzegovina)

15 October 2024
13:00

Poland	3–0	Turkey
Mikołajewski 39', 78' (pen.); Borys 90+1' (pen.)	Report

Stal Stalowa Wola, Stalowa Wola
Referee: Jasper Vergoote (Belgium)
15 October 2024
13:00

Gibraltar	1–2	Malta
Chipolina 53' (pen.)	Report	Melillo 18'; Agius 73' (pen.)

Grzegorz Lato Municipal Stadium, Mielec
Referee: Granit Maqedonci (Sweden)

==== Group 5 ====
Pos	Team	Pld	W	D	L	GF	GA	GD	Pts	Qualification
1	France	3	2	1	0	9	1	+8	7	Elite round
2	Wales	3	2	0	1	7	2	+5	6	Elite round
3	Scotland (H)	3	1	1	1	4	1	+3	4	
4	Liechtenstein	3	0	0	3	0	16	−16	0	

Source: UEFA
Rules for classification: Tiebreakers
(H) Hosts
13 November 2024
16:00

Wales	1–0	Scotland
Biancheri 18'	Report

Forthbank Stadium, Stirling
Referee: Snir Levy (Israel)
13 November 2024
20:30

France	7–0	Liechtenstein
Cabral 17', 36'; Milliner 44'; Weissenhofer 71' (o.g.); T. Gomis 76', 90+1'; Sylla 78'	Report

Dumbarton Football Stadium, Dumbarton
Referee: Helgi Mikael Jónasson (Iceland)

16 November 2024
16:00

Scotland	4–0	Liechtenstein
Bavidge 6', 90+3'; MacLeod 39'; Watret 85'	Report

Cappielow, Greenock
Referee: Helgi Mikael Jónasson (Iceland)
16 November 2024
20:30

France	2–1	Wales
Bamba 33'; T. Gomis 59'	Report	Bostock 29'

Forthbank Stadium, Stirling
Referee: Menelaos Antoniou (Cyprus)

19 November 2024
16:00

Liechtenstein	0–5	Wales
	Report	Andrews 9', 37'; Biancheri 69', 75' (pen.), 79'

Falkirk Stadium, Falkirk
Referee: Snir Levy (Israel)
19 November 2024
20:30

Scotland	0–0	France
	Report

Falkirk Stadium, Falkirk
Referee: Menelaos Antoniou (Cyprus)

==== Group 6 ====
Pos	Team	Pld	W	D	L	GF	GA	GD	Pts	Qualification
1	Czech Republic	3	2	0	1	5	3	+2	6 (Note: Head-to-head results: Switzerland 0–1 Finland, Czech Republic 0–1 Switzerland, Finland 2–3 Czech Republic. Head-to-head standings: Czech Republic: 3 pts, 0 GD (3 GF, 3 GA), Czech Republic won against Finland; Finland: 3 pts, 0 GD (3 GF, 3 GA), Finland lost against Czech Republic; Switzerland: 3 pts, 0 GD (1 GF, 1 GA))	Elite round
2	Finland (H)	3	2	0	1	8	3	+5	6	Elite round
3	Switzerland	3	2	0	1	5	1	+4	6	
4	San Marino	3	0	0	3	0	11	−11	0	

Source: UEFA
Rules for classification: Tiebreakers
(H) Hosts
Notes:
9 October 2024
12:00

Czech Republic	2–0	San Marino
Konečný 82'; Pikolon 89'	Report

Myyrmäki Stadium, Vantaa
Referee: Bulat Sariyev (Kazakhstan)
9 October 2024
17:00

Switzerland	0–1	Finland
	Report	Ezeh 75'

Myyrmäki Stadium, Vantaa
Referee: Ashot Ghaltakhchyan (Armenia)

12 October 2024
12:00

Finland	5–0	San Marino
Helén 22', 46'; Paananen 59', 87'; Nzoko 75'	Report

Järvenpään keskuskenttä, Järvenpää
Referee: Bulat Sariyev (Kazakhstan)
12 October 2024
17:00

Czech Republic	0–1	Switzerland
	Report	Tsimba 35'

Järvenpään keskuskenttä, Järvenpää
Referee: Ishmael Barbara (Malta)

15 October 2024
12:00

Finland	2–3	Czech Republic
Mentu 34'; Ezeh 45+2'	Report	Pikolon 18'; Hranoš 47'; Tošnar 63'

Myyrmäki Stadium, Vantaa
Referee: Ishmael Barbara (Malta)
15 October 2024
12:00

San Marino	0–4	Switzerland
	Report	Derbaci 16', 35'; Romano 27' (pen.); Parente 37'

Järvenpään keskuskenttä, Järvenpää
Referee: Ashot Ghaltakhchyan (Armenia)

==== Group 7 ====
Pos	Team	Pld	W	D	L	GF	GA	GD	Pts	Qualification
1	Republic of Ireland	3	2	1	0	6	1	+5	7	Elite round
2	Iceland	3	2	0	1	4	2	+2	6	Elite round
3	Moldova (H)	3	0	2	1	2	3	−1	2	
4	Azerbaijan	3	0	1	2	2	8	−6	1	

Source: UEFA
Rules for classification: Tiebreakers
(H) Hosts
13 November 2024
11:00

Azerbaijan	0–2	Iceland
	Report	Johannessen 25', 89'

Zimbru-2 Stadium, Chișinău
Referee: David Dickinson (Scotland)
13 November 2024
13:00

Republic of Ireland	0–0	Moldova
	Report

Nisporeni Central Stadium, Nisporeni
Referee: Jan Petrik (Czech Republic)

16 November 2024
11:00

Republic of Ireland	4–0	Azerbaijan
Okosun 7'; Ochoa 51'; Ashbee 70'; Dillon 78'	Report

Zimbru-2 Stadium, Chișinău
Referee: Miloš Milanović (Serbia)
16 November 2024
13:00

Iceland	1–0	Moldova
Obiscalov 9' (o.g.)	Report

Zimbru Stadium, Chișinău
Referee: Jan Petrik (Czech Republic)

19 November 2024
12:00

Iceland	1–2	Republic of Ireland
Johannesson 55' (pen.)	Report	Stefánsson 8' (o.g.); Razi 69'

Zimbru-2 Stadium, Chișinău
Referee: Miloš Milanović (Serbia)
19 November 2024
12:00

Moldova	2–2	Azerbaijan
Sula 55'; David 90+7'	Report	Nazarli 15', 45+2'

Zimbru Stadium, Chișinău
Referee: David Dickinson (Scotland)

==== Group 8 ====
Pos	Team	Pld	W	D	L	GF	GA	GD	Pts	Qualification
1	Italy	3	3	0	0	7	0	+7	9	Elite round
2	Montenegro	3	2	0	1	6	5	+1	6	Elite round
3	Greece (H)	3	1	0	2	5	6	−1	3	
4	Bosnia and Herzegovina	3	0	0	3	4	11	−7	0	

Source: UEFA
Rules for classification: Tiebreakers
(H) Hosts
13 November 2024
12:00

Italy	3–0	Montenegro
Mannini 23'; Ekhator 45'; Riccio 61'	Report

Municipal Stadium of Archanes, Archanes
Referee: Henrik Nalbandyan (Armenia)
13 November 2024
13:30

Bosnia and Herzegovina	2–5	Greece
Alajbegović 25'; Marčetić 80'	Report	Panagakos 5'; Mythou 12' (pen.); Bregou 16'; Polykratis 55'; Chatsidis 78'

Theodoros Vardinogiannis Stadium, Heraklion
Referee: Alan Kijas (Austria)

16 November 2024
12:00

Italy	3–0	Bosnia and Herzegovina
Camarda 4'; Mannini 11', 26'	Report

Municipal Stadium of Archanes, Archanes
Referee: Joni Hyytiä (Finland)
16 November 2024
13:30

Greece	0–3	Montenegro
	Report	Perović 60'; Bulatović 82' (pen.); Tadić 90'

Theodoros Vardinogiannis Stadium, Heraklion
Referee: Alan Kijas (Austria)

19 November 2024
13:30

Greece	0–1	Italy
	Report	Camarda 87' (pen.)

Theodoros Vardinogiannis Stadium, Heraklion
Referee: Henrik Nalbandyan (Armenia)
19 November 2024
13:30

Montenegro	3–2	Bosnia and Herzegovina
Vukanić 2'; Camaj 5'; Kostić 88'	Report	Alajbegović 66' (pen.); Muharemović 79'

Municipal Stadium of Archanes, Archanes
Referee: Joni Hyytiä (Finland)

==== Group 9 ====
Pos	Team	Pld	W	D	L	GF	GA	GD	Pts	Qualification
1	Norway	3	3	0	0	7	4	+3	9	Elite round
2	Georgia	3	1	1	1	5	5	0	4	Elite round
3	Estonia	3	1	1	1	4	4	0	4	
4	Sweden (H)	3	0	0	3	3	6	−3	0	

Source: UEFA
Rules for classification: Tiebreakers
(H) Hosts
13 November 2024
13:00

Norway	2–1	Estonia
Spiten-Nysæter 68'; G. Nyheim 90+2' (pen.)	Report	Siht 44'

Borås Arena, Borås
Referee: David Fuxman (Israel)
13 November 2024
18:00

Georgia	2–1	Sweden
Nikolaishvili 70'; Geguchadze 88'	Report	Sernelius 30'

Borås Arena, Borås
Referee: Mervan Bejtullahu (Kosovo)

16 November 2024
13:00

Norway	3–2	Georgia
Nyhammer 23'; Ekorness 39'; Reitan-Sunde 86'	Report	Salia 48'; Gogsadze 76'

Borås Arena, Borås
Referee: Mervan Bejtullahu (Kosovo)
16 November 2024
18:00

Sweden	1–2	Estonia
Pihlström 10'	Report	Siht 35'; Kalimullin 42'

Borås Arena, Borås
Referee: Lothar D'hondt (Belgium)

19 November 2024
18:00

Sweden	1–2	Norway
Sernelius 90+2'	Report	Sernelius 73' (o.g.); Rønning 81'

Borås Arena, Borås
Referee: David Fuxman (Israel)
19 November 2024
18:00

Estonia	1–1	Georgia
Kalimullin 17' (pen.)	Report	Pihela 41' (o.g.)

Hisingen Arena, Gothenburg
Referee: Lothar D'hondt (Belgium)

==== Group 10 ====
Pos	Team	Pld	W	D	L	GF	GA	GD	Pts	Qualification
1	Austria	3	2	0	1	8	1	+7	6 (Note: Head-to-head goal difference: Austria +3; Spain 0; Kosovo –3.)	Elite round
2	Spain	3	2	0	1	7	4	+3	6	Elite round
3	Kosovo (H)	3	2	0	1	6	7	−1	6	
4	Faroe Islands	3	0	0	3	0	9	−9	0	

Source: UEFA
Rules for classification: Tiebreakers
(H) Hosts
Notes:
13 November 2024
12:00

Spain	3–0	Faroe Islands
Cordero 29'; Martín 51'; Janneh 79'	Report

Zahir Pajaziti Stadium, Podujevë
Referee: Michal Očenáš (Slovakia)
13 November 2024
15:00

Kosovo	0–4	Austria
	Report	Verhounig 9', 65'; Grgic 73'; Adejenughure 80'

Fadil Vokrri Stadium, Pristina
Referee: David Šmajc (Slovenia)

16 November 2024
12:00

Austria	4–0	Faroe Islands
Verhounig 19'; Grgic 64'; Adejenughure 67'; Živković 83'	Report

Zahir Pajaziti Stadium, Podujevë
Referee: Michal Očenáš (Slovakia)
16 November 2024
15:00

Spain	3–4	Kosovo
Prim 14'; Marcos 26'; Janneh 47'	Report	Gerbovci 28'; Gashi 34'; Jiménez 41' (o.g.); Gashijan 90+3'

Fadil Vokrri Stadium, Pristina
Referee: Oliver Reitala (Finland)

19 November 2024
12:00

Austria	0–1	Spain
	Report	García 90'

Zahir Pajaziti Stadium, Podujevë
Referee: David Šmajc (Slovenia)
19 November 2024
15:00

Faroe Islands	0–2	Kosovo
	Report	Gerbovci 31'; Bujupi 52'

Fadil Vokrri Stadium, Pristina
Referee: Michal Očenáš (Slovakia)

==== Group 11 ====
Pos	Team	Pld	W	D	L	GF	GA	GD	Pts	Qualification
1	Denmark	3	3	0	0	8	2	+6	9	Elite round
2	Israel	3	2	0	1	11	4	+7	6	Elite round
3	Northern Ireland	3	1	0	2	2	7	−5	3	
4	Albania (H)	3	0	0	3	0	8	−8	0	

Source: UEFA
Rules for classification: Tiebreakers
(H) Hosts
13 November 2024
12:00

Northern Ireland	0–4	Denmark
	Report	Gogorza 18', 26'; Schwartau 21'; Juul-Sandberg 32'

Niko Dovana Stadium, Durrës
Referee: Martin Dohal (Slovakia)
13 November 2024
14:00

Israel	6–0	Albania
Zoabi 4'; Hazan 18', 55' (pen.); Khalaily 28'; Oli 52'; Magor 75'	Report

Elbasan Arena, Elbasan
Referee: Oleksii Derevinskyi (Ukraine)

16 November 2024
12:00

Israel	3–1	Northern Ireland
Tishler 6'; Hazan 52'; Ranon 83'	Report	Orr 77'

Niko Dovana Stadium, Durrës
Referee: Martin Dohal (Slovakia)
16 November 2024
14:00

Denmark	1–0	Albania
Jensen 37'	Report

Elbasan Arena, Elbasan
Referee: Joonas Jaanovits (Estonia)

19 November 2024
15:00

Denmark	3–2	Israel
Themsen 35'; Schwartau 39' (pen.); Gogorza 61'	Report	Abu Farchi 47'; Oli 86'

House of Football Natural Pitch, Tirana
Referee: Oleksii Derevinskyi (Ukraine)
19 November 2024
15:00

Albania	0–1	Northern Ireland
	Report	Graham 89'

Elbasan Arena, Elbasan
Referee: Joonas Jaanovits (Estonia)

==== Group 12 ====
Pos	Team	Pld	W	D	L	GF	GA	GD	Pts	Qualification
1	Slovakia	3	2	0	1	5	3	+2	6	Elite round
2	Luxembourg (H)	3	1	1	1	5	5	0	4 (Note: Ranked on head-to-head points: Luxembourg: 3, Latvia: 0)	Elite round
3	Latvia	3	1	1	1	5	4	+1	4	Elite round
4	North Macedonia	3	0	2	1	2	5	−3	2	

Source: UEFA
Rules for classification: Tiebreakers
(H) Hosts
Notes:
9 October 2024
18:00

Slovakia	2–1	Luxembourg
Kubka 32'; Petruška 70'	Report	Nurenberg 26'

Kaerjenger Dribbel, Bascharage
Attendance: 647
Referee: Dominik Starý (Czech Republic)
9 October 2024
18:00

North Macedonia	1–1	Latvia
Gashtarov 76' (pen.)	Report	Mickēvičs 60'

Stade Municipal de la Ville de Differdange, Differdange
Attendance: 25
Referee: Kristoffer Hagenes (Norway)

12 October 2024
18:00

Slovakia	3–0	North Macedonia
Dikoš 34' (pen.); Sinanov 38' (o.g.); Petruška 67'	Report

Stade Jos Nosbaum, Dudelange
Attendance: 50
Referee: Gustavo Correia (Portugal)
12 October 2024
18:00

Latvia	2–3	Luxembourg
Mickēvičs 50'; Bočs 76'	Report	Domingos 38', 57'; Pinheiro 89'

Stade Municipal de la Ville de Differdange, Differdange
Attendance: 264
Referee: Dominik Starý (Czech Republic)

15 October 2024
18:00

Latvia	2–0	Slovakia
Strods 37'; Purs 90'	Report

Kaerjenger Dribbel, Bascharage
Attendance: 60
Referee: Kristoffer Hagenes (Norway)
15 October 2024
18:00

Luxembourg	1–1	North Macedonia
Domingos 45+3'	Report	Danev 8'

Stade Jos Nosbaum, Dudelange
Attendance: 325
Referee: Gustavo Correia (Portugal)

==== Group 13 ====
Pos	Team	Pld	W	D	L	GF	GA	GD	Pts	Qualification
1	Serbia	3	2	1	0	7	2	+5	7	Elite round
2	Croatia (H)	3	2	0	1	6	3	+3	6	Elite round
3	Belarus	3	1	1	1	5	5	0	4	
4	Armenia	3	0	0	3	1	9	−8	0	

Source: UEFA
Rules for classification: Tiebreakers
(H) Hosts
13 November 2024
12:00

Serbia	2–2	Belarus
Cvetković 4'; Đorđević 85'	Report	Simanenko 52'; Mikanovich 72'

Gradski stadion Sisak, Sisak
Referee: Damian Kos (Poland)
13 November 2024
13:00

Armenia	0–4	Croatia
	Report	Durdov 9'; Živković 31'; Baždarić 53', 60'

Stadion Branko Čavlović-Čavlek, Karlovac
Referee: Miguel Nogueira (Portugal)

16 November 2024
12:00

Serbia	2–0	Armenia
Bačanin 24'; Đorđević 61'	Report

Gradski stadion Sisak, Sisak
Referee: Joey Kooij (The Netherlands)
16 November 2024
13:00

Croatia	2–0	Belarus
Baždarić 3' (pen.); Lukić 90+8' (pen.)	Report

Stadion Branko Čavlović-Čavlek, Karlovac
Referee: Damian Kos (Poland)

19 November 2024
13:00

Croatia	0–3	Serbia
	Report	Cvetković 6' (pen.); Popović 35'; Ugrešić 40'

Stadion Branko Čavlović-Čavlek, Karlovac
Referee: Joey Kooij (The Netherlands)
19 November 2024
13:00

Belarus	3–1	Armenia
Akatov 21'; Simanenko 30', 52'	Report	Batoian 74'

Gradski stadion Sisak, Sisak
Referee: Miguel Nogueira (Portugal)

== Ranking of third-placed teams ==
To determine the best third-placed team from the qualifying round which advance to the elite round, only the results of the third-placed teams against the first and second-placed teams in their group are taken into account.

Pos	Grp	Team	Pld	W	D	L	GF	GA	GD	Pts	Qualification
1	12	Latvia	2	1	0	1	4	3	+1	3	Elite Round
2	6	Switzerland	2	1	0	1	1	1	0	3	
3	10	Kosovo	2	1	0	1	4	7	−3	3	
4	3	Bulgaria	2	0	1	1	2	3	−1	1	
5	9	Estonia	2	0	1	1	2	3	−1	1	
6	7	Moldova	2	0	1	1	0	1	−1	1	
7	5	Scotland	2	0	1	1	0	1	−1	1	
8	13	Belarus	2	0	1	1	2	4	−2	1	
9	1	Kazakhstan	2	0	0	2	1	4	−3	0	
10	2	Cyprus	2	0	0	2	2	6	−4	0	
11	8	Greece	2	0	0	2	0	4	−4	0	
12	11	Northern Ireland	2	0	0	2	1	7	−6	0	
13	4	Malta	2	0	0	2	0	8	−8	0	

Source: UEFA
Rules for classification: 1) points; 2) goal difference; 3) goals scored; 4) disciplinary points; 5) coefficient; 6) drawing of lots.

== Elite round ==
=== Draw ===
The draw for the elite round was held on 5 December 2024 at 11:00 CET at the UEFA headquarters in Nyon, Switzerland.

The teams were seeded according to their results in the qualifying round. Portugal which received a bye to the elite round, were automatically seeded into Pot A. Each group contains one team from Pot A, one team from Pot B, one team from Pot C, and one team from Pot D. Winners and runners-up from the same qualifying round group could not be drawn in the same group, but the best third-placed team could be drawn in the same group as winners or runners-up from the same qualifying round group.

2024/25 qualifying round results

Pot A
Team	Pos.	Pts.	GD	GS	Coef.
Portugal	Seeded	–	–	–	–
Poland	Group 4 winners	6	9	9	3.000
Denmark	Group 11 winners	6	5	7	3.000
Netherlands	Group 1 winners	6	4	4	3.000
Italy	Group 8 winners	6	4	4	3.000
Germany	Group 2 winners	6	3	5	3.000
Norway	Group 9 winners	6	2	5	3.000

Pot B
Team	Pos.	Pts.	GD	GS	Coef.
Serbia	Group 13 winners	4	3	5	2.000
France	Group 5 winners	4	1	2	2.000
Republic of Ireland	Group 7 winners	4	1	2	2.000
England	Group 3 winners	4	1	2	2.000
Austria	Group 10 winners	3	3	4	1.500
Czech Republic	Group 6 winners	3	0	3	1.500
Slovakia	Group 12 winners	3	-1	2	1.500

2024/25 qualifying round results

Pot C
Team	Pos.	Pts.	GD	GS	Coef.
Israel	Group 11 runners-up	3	1	5	1.500
Hungary	Group 2 runners-up	3	1	4	1.500
Spain	Group 10 runners-up	3	0	4	1.500
Luxembourg	Group 12 runners-up	3	0	4	1.500
Finland	Group 6 runners-up	3	0	3	1.500
Montenegro	Group 8 runners-up	3	0	3	1.500
Wales	Group 5 runners-up	3	0	2	1.500

Pot D
Team	Pos.	Pts.	GD	GS	Coef.
Iceland	Group 7 runners-up	3	0	2	1.500
Turkey	Group 4 runners-up	3	-1	2	1.500
Slovenia	Group 1 runners-up	3	-1	2	1.500
Croatia	Group 13 runners-up	3	-1	2	1.500
Belgium	Group 3 runners-up	2	0	1	1.000
Georgia	Group 9 runners-up	1	-1	3	0.500
Latvia	Group 12 third-place	3	1	4	1.500

=== Group 1 ===
Pos	Team	Pld	W	D	L	GF	GA	GD	Pts	Promotion
1	Denmark	3	3	0	0	5	1	+4	9	Qualified for the final tournament
2	Austria	3	2	0	1	7	4	+3	6	
3	Hungary (H)	3	1	0	2	2	4	−2	3	
4	Iceland	3	0	0	3	1	6	−5	0	

Source: UEFA
Rules for classification: Qualification tiebreakers
(H) Hosts
19 March 2025
15:00

Denmark	2–0	Iceland
Schwartau 35'; Símonarson 45+1' (o.g.)	Report

Bocskai Stadion, Hajdúszoboszló
Attendance: 155
Referee: Mohammad Usman Aslam (Norway)
19 March 2025
16:00

Hungary	1–3	Austria
Szabó 37'	Report	Adejenughure 2', 17'; Grgic 14'

Várkerti Stadion, Kisvárda
Attendance: 236
Referee: Snir Levy (Israel)

22 March 2025
15:00

Austria	3–1	Iceland
Živković 12'; Brandtner 16'; Feiner 45+1'	Report	Jónsson 45'

Bocskai Stadion, Hajdúszoboszló
Attendance: 172
Referee: Snir Levy (Israel)
22 March 2025
15:00

Denmark	1–0	Hungary
Gogorza 664'	Report

Városi Stadion, Nyíregyháza
Attendance: 1278
Referee: Pavle Ilić (Serbia)

25 March 2025
15:00

Austria	1–2	Denmark
Spalt 55'	Report	Larsen 70'; Gogorza 74'

Bocskai Stadion, Hajdúszoboszló
Attendance: 190
Referee: Mohammad Usman Aslam (Norway)
25 March 2025
15:00

Iceland	0–1	Hungary
	Report	Mondovics 62'

Várkerti Stadion, Kisvárda
Attendance: 613
Referee: Pavle Ilić (Serbia)

=== Group 2 ===
Pos	Team	Pld	W	D	L	GF	GA	GD	Pts	Promotion
1	Montenegro	3	2	1	0	5	2	+3	7	Qualified for the final tournament
2	Poland	3	2	0	1	5	1	+4	6	
3	Georgia (H)	3	1	0	2	3	6	−3	3	
4	Slovakia	3	0	1	2	1	5	−4	1	

Source: UEFA
Rules for classification: Qualification tiebreakers
(H) Hosts
19 March 2025
11:00

Montenegro	1–1	Slovakia
Adžić 16'	Report	Petruška 73'

David Petriashvili Stadium, Tbilisi
Attendance: 20
Referee: Jovan Kachevski (North Macedonia)
19 March 2025
16:00

Poland	3–0	Georgia
Gurgul 17'; Sznaucner 50'; Mikołajewski 54' (pen.)	Report

Mikheil Meskhi II Stadium, Tbilisi
Attendance: 850
Referee: Ante Čulina (Croatia)

22 March 2025
11:00

Poland	0–1	Montenegro
	Report	Adžić 45'

David Petriashvili Stadium, Tbilisi
Attendance: 20
Referee: Jovan Kachevski (North Macedonia)
22 March 2025
16:00

Slovakia	0–2	Georgia
	Report	Peikrishvili 67'; Chikovani 90'

Mikheil Meskhi II Stadium, Tbilisi
Attendance: 400
Referee: Sayat Karabayev (Kazakhstan)

25 March 2025
16:00

Slovakia	0–2	Poland
	Report	Nowakowski 10'; Rybak 26'

David Petriashvili Stadium, Tbilisi
Attendance: 75
Referee: Ante Čulina (Croatia)
25 March 2025
16:00

Georgia	1–3	Montenegro
Geguchadze 7'	Report	Perović 39'; Camaj 58'; Kostić 88'

Mikheil Meskhi II Stadium, Tbilisi
Attendance: 700
Referee: Sayat Karabayev (Kazakhstan)

=== Group 3 ===
Pos	Team	Pld	W	D	L	GF	GA	GD	Pts	Promotion
1	Netherlands	3	2	1	0	6	1	+5	7	Qualified for the final tournament
2	Czech Republic (H)	3	2	0	1	3	4	−1	6	
3	Luxembourg	3	1	1	1	2	3	−1	4	
4	Croatia	3	0	0	3	2	5	−3	0	

Source: UEFA
Rules for classification: Qualification tiebreakers
(H) Hosts
19 March 2025
14:00

Netherlands	2–1	Croatia
Oufkir 17'; Verkuijl 90+3'	Report	Živković 15'

FK Chmel Blšany, Blšany
Attendance: 320
Referee: Kamal Umudlu (Azerbaijan)
19 March 2025
17:00

Luxembourg	0–2	Czech Republic
	Report	Rus 43', 51'

Letní stadion, Chomutov
Attendance: 720
Referee: Antoine Chiaramonti (Andorra)

22 March 2025
14:00

Netherlands	0–0	Luxembourg
	Report

FK Chmel Blšany, Blšany
Attendance: 165
Referee: Antoine Chiaramonti (Andorra)
22 March 2025
17:00

Czech Republic	1–0	Croatia
Pech 75'	Report

Letní stadion, Chomutov
Attendance: 1090
Referee: Menelaos Antoniou (Cyprus)

25 March 2025
17:00

Czech Republic	0–4	Netherlands
	Report	Oufkir 7', 73', 77', 90+2'

Letní stadion, Chomutov
Attendance: 1210
Referee: Kamal Umudlu (Azerbaijan)
25 March 2025
17:00

Croatia	1–2	Luxembourg
Kulušić 57'	Report	Brites 67'; Duarte 77'

FK Chmel Blšany, Blšany
Attendance: 156
Referee: Menelaos Antoniou (Cyprus)

=== Group 4 ===
Pos	Team	Pld	W	D	L	GF	GA	GD	Pts	Promotion
1	Norway	3	3	0	0	6	2	+4	9	Qualified for the final tournament
2	Serbia (H)	3	1	1	1	5	5	0	4	
3	Belgium	3	1	1	1	4	5	−1	4	
4	Israel	3	0	0	3	5	8	−3	0	

Source: UEFA
Rules for classification: Qualification tiebreakers
(H) Hosts
19 March 2025
11:00

Norway	2–0	Belgium
Olderheim 52'; Øren 78'	Report

Voždovac Stadium, Belgrade
Attendance: 40
Referee: Dominik Starý (Czech Republic)
19 March 2025
17:00

Israel	2–3	Serbia
Simić 12' (o.g.); Balay 77'	Report	Sremčević 57'; Simić 62'; Đorđević 90+3'

Stadium Sportski centar "Mladost", Pančevo
Attendance: 375
Referee: Damian Kos (Poland)

22 March 2025
11:00

Norway	2–1	Israel
Spiten-Nysæter 35'; Ardraa 90+4'	Report	Abu Farchi 81'

Voždovac Stadium, Belgrade
Attendance: 65
Referee: Mihály Káprály (Hungary)
22 March 2025
17:00

Serbia	1–1	Belgium
L. Jovanović 2'	Report	Musuayi 53'

Stadium Sportski centar "Mladost", Pančevo
Attendance: 800
Referee: Dominik Starý (Czech Republic)

25 March 2025
17:00

Serbia	1–2	Norway
M. Popović 43'	Report	Olderheim 37', 90+4' (pen.)

Stadium Sportski centar "Mladost", Pančevo
Attendance: 700
Referee: Damian Kos (Poland)
25 March 2025
17:00

Belgium	3–2	Israel
Furo 37'; Buggea 42'; Musuayi 80'	Report	Zoabi 30'; Belay 76'

Voždovac Stadium, Belgrade
Attendance: 75
Referee: Mihály Káprály (Hungary)

=== Group 5 ===
Pos	Team	Pld	W	D	L	GF	GA	GD	Pts	Promotion
1	Spain	3	2	1	0	8	4	+4	7	Qualified for the final tournament
2	Italy (H)	3	1	2	0	5	3	+2	5	
3	France	3	1	0	2	3	5	−2	3	
4	Latvia	3	0	1	2	3	7	−4	1	

Source: UEFA
Rules for classification: Qualification tiebreakers
(H) Hosts
19 March 2025
14:00

Spain	2–1	France
Martín 9'; Aguado 55'	Report	Bouneb 44'

Stadio San Vito-Gigi Marulla, Cosenza
Attendance: 732
Referee: Antoni Bandić (Bosnia and Herzegovina)
19 March 2025
17:00

Italy	1–1	Latvia
Ekhator 28'	Report	Joksts 87'

Stadio Ezio Scida, Crotone
Attendance: 3090
Referee: Zorbay Küçük (Turkey)

22 March 2025
14:00

France	2–1	Latvia
Detourbet 76'; T. Gomis 86' (pen.)	Report	Ivulāns 34'

Stadio San Vito-Gigi Marulla, Cosenza
Attendance: 199
Referee: Bulat Sariyev (Kazakhstan)
22 March 2025
17:00

Italy	2–2	Spain
Liberali 29' (pen.), 84'	Report	Monserrate 17'; Cordero 89' (pen.)

Stadio Nicola Ceravolo, Catanzaro
Attendance: 5307
Referee: Zorbay Küçük (Turkey)

25 March 2025
15:00

France	0–2	Italy
	Report	Camarda 24'; Ekhator 50'

Stadio Nicola Ceravolo, Catanzaro
Attendance: 3620
Referee: Antoni Bandić (Bosnia and Herzegovina)
25 March 2025
15:00

Latvia	1–4	Spain
Ivulāns 75'	Report	Díaz 13'; Marcos 15'; Pastor 89'; Huestamendia 90'

Stadio San Vito-Gigi Marulla, Cosenza
Attendance: 199
Referee: Bulat Sariyev (Kazakhstan)

=== Group 6 ===
Pos	Team	Pld	W	D	L	GF	GA	GD	Pts	Promotion
1	Germany (H)	3	3	0	0	5	1	+4	9	Qualified for the final tournament
2	Slovenia	3	1	1	1	3	4	−1	4	
3	Finland	3	1	0	2	5	4	+1	3	
4	Republic of Ireland	3	0	1	2	1	5	−4	1	

Source: UEFA
Rules for classification: Qualification tiebreakers
(H) Hosts
19 March 2025
11:00

Finland	3–0	Republic of Ireland
Siltanen 4'; Nzoko 55'; Mentu 66'	Report

Sportzentrum Windmühlenberg, Wolfsburg
Attendance: 69
Referee: Mervan Bejtullahu (Kosovo)
19 March 2025
15:00

Germany	2–0	Slovenia
Darvich 4'; Moerstedt 16'	Report

Drömlingstadion, Wolfsburg
Attendance: 521
Referee: Patrik Kolarić (Croatia)

22 March 2025
11:00

Republic of Ireland	1–1	Slovenia
Dillon 45' (pen.)	Report	Šerbec 8'

Sportzentrum Windmühlenberg, Wolfsburg
Attendance: 121
Referee: Mervan Bejtullahu (Kosovo)
22 March 2025
15:00

Germany	2–1	Finland
Wätjen 10'; Darvich 58'	Report	Lähteenmäki 28'

GWG-Stadion, Gifhorn
Attendance: 1006
Referee: Henrik Nalbandyan (Armenia)

25 March 2025
15:00

Republic of Ireland	0–1	Germany
	Report	Herwerth 5'

Drömlingstadion, Wolfsburg
Attendance: 522
Referee: Henrik Nalbandyan (Armenia)
25 March 2025
15:00

Slovenia	2–1	Finland
Brdik 44'; Grlić 78'	Report	Helén 90+2'

GWG-Stadion, Gifhorn
Attendance: 37
Referee: Patrik Kolarić (Croatia)

=== Group 7 ===
Pos	Team	Pld	W	D	L	GF	GA	GD	Pts	Promotion
1	England	3	2	1	0	3	0	+3	7	Qualified for the final tournament
2	Portugal	3	1	1	1	3	3	0	4	
3	Wales (H)	3	1	0	2	3	4	−1	3	
4	Turkey	3	0	2	1	3	5	−2	2	

Source: UEFA
Rules for classification: Qualification tiebreakers
(H) Hosts
19 March 2025
12:00

Portugal	2–2	Turkey
Martins 49'; Neto 80'	Report	Ertürk 41' (pen.); Korkut 47'

Deeside Stadium, Connah's Quay
Attendance: 428
Referee: Christos Vergetis (Greece)
19 March 2025
20:00

Wales	0–2	England
	Report	Wheatley 57'; Mheuka 84'

Nantporth Stadium, Bangor
Attendance: 2,541
Referee: Granit Maqedonci (Sweden)

22 March 2025
12:00

England	0–0	Turkey
	Report

Deeside Stadium, Connah's Quay
Attendance: 742
Referee: Granit Maqedonci (Sweden)
22 March 2025
18:00

Portugal	1–0	Wales
Silva 68'	Report

Belle Vue, Rhyl
Attendance: 1,607
Referee: Edgars Maļcevs (Latvia)

25 March 2025
20:00

England	1–0	Portugal
Rigg 9'	Report

Deeside Stadium, Connah's Quay
Attendance: 1,009
Referee: Edgars Maļcevs (Latvia)
25 March 2025
20:00

Turkey	1–3	Wales
Başkan 43'	Report	Issaka 3'; Biancheri 67'; Myles 82'

Belle Vue, Rhyl
Attendance: 1,711
Referee: Christos Vergetis (Greece)

== Goalscorers ==
In the qualifying round, there have been 236 goals scored in 78 matches, for an average of 3.03 goals per match (as of 19 November 2024).

In the elite round there have been 106 goals scored in 42 matches, for an average of 2.52 goals per match (as of 25 March 2025).

In total, there have been 342 goals scored in 120 matches, for an average of 2.85 goals per match (as of 25 March 2025).

6 goals

- (Poland) Daniel Mikołajewski

5 goals

- (Denmark) Mikel Gogorza
- (Netherlands) Ayoub Oufkir
- (Wales) Gabriele Biancheri

4 goals

- (Austria) Oghenetejiri Adejenughure
- (France) Tidiam Gomis
- (Germany) Paris Brunner

3 goals

- (Austria) Leon Grgic
- (Austria) Phillip Verhounig
- (Belarus) Timofei Simanenko
- (Belgium) Kaye Furo
- (Bulgaria) Filip Gigov
- (Croatia) Antonio Baždarić
- (Denmark) Oscar Schwartau
- (Finland) Onni Helén
- (Germany) Noah Darvich
- (Israel) Liran Hazan
- (Italy) Francesco Camarda
- (Italy) Jeff Ekhator
- (Italy) Mattia Mannini
- (Luxembourg) Fabio Domingos
- (Norway) Sebastian Olderheim
- (Poland) Kacper Nowakowski
- (Serbia) Luka Đorđević
- (Slovakia) Róbert Petruška
- (Turkey) Gökdeniz Gürpüz

2 goals

- (Austria) Jovan Živković
- (Azerbaijan) Hasan Nazarli
- (Belgium) Yanis Musuayi
- (Bosnia and Herzegovina) Kerim Alajbegović
- (Croatia) Filip Živković
- (Czech Republic) Samuel Pikolon
- (Czech Republic) Daniel Rus
- (England) Ethan Nwaneri
- (Estonia) Maksim Kalimullin
- (Estonia) Rommi Siht
- (Finland) David Ezeh
- (Finland) Pyry Mentu
- (Finland) Djoully Nzoko
- (Finland) Julius Paananen
- (France) Pape Cabral
- (Georgia (country)) Saba Geguchadze
- (Germany) Robert Ramsak
- (Hungary) Hunor Németh
- (Iceland) Tómas Johannessen
- (Israel) Yehuda Balay
- (Israel) Sayed Abu Farchi
- (Israel) Ido Oli
- (Israel) Karem Zoabi
- (Italy) Mattia Liberali
- (Kazakhstan) Tamerlan Agimanov
- (Kosovo) Dior Gerbovci
- (Latvia) Markuss Ivulāns
- (Latvia) Tomašs Mickēvičs
- (Montenegro) Vasilije Adžić
- (Montenegro) Andrej Camaj
- (Montenegro) Andrej Kostić
- (Montenegro) Filip Perović
- (Norway) Oskar Spiten-Nysæter
- (Poland) Alan Rybak
- (Republic of Ireland) Cian Dillon
- (Scotland) Alfie Bavidge
- (Serbia) Mihajlo Cvetković
- (Serbia) Matija Popović
- (Slovenia) Luka Topalović
- (Spain) Antonio Cordero
- (Spain) Omar Janneh
- (Spain) Jon Martín
- (Spain) Óscar Marcos Santamaría
- (Sweden) Noel Sernelius
- (Switzerland) Dorian Derbaci
- (Turkey) Yalın Dilek
- (Wales) Kai Andrews

1 goal

- (Armenia) David Batoian
- (Austria) Jakob Brandtner
- (Austria) Fabian Feiner
- (Austria) Yanik Spalt
- (Belarus) Artyom Akatov
- (Belarus) Erik Mikanovich
- (Belgium) Simon Buggea
- (Belgium) Laurens Goemaere
- (Belgium) Gilles De Meyer
- (Belgium) Robin Mirisola
- (Bosnia and Herzegovina) Stefan Marčetić
- (Bosnia and Herzegovina) Kenan Muharemović
- (Bulgaria) Adrian Raychev
- (Croatia) Bruno Durdov
- (Croatia) Lovre Kulušić
- (Croatia) Oliver Lukić
- (Cyprus) Andreas Nikolaou
- (Cyprus) Constantinos Poursaitides
- (Cyprus) Dimitrianos Tzouliou
- (Czech Republic) Vojtěch Hranoš
- (Czech Republic) Mikuláš Konečný
- (Czech Republic) Dominik Pech
- (Czech Republic) Jakub Tošnar
- (Denmark) Tobias Lund Jensen
- (Denmark) Nikolaj Juul-Sandberg
- (Denmark) Lukas Larsen
- (Denmark) Mike Themsen
- (England) Shim Mheuka
- (England) Lewis Orford
- (England) Christopher Rigg
- (England) Ethan Wheatley
- (Finland) Juho Lähteenmäki
- (Finland) Matias Siltanen
- (France) Aladji Bamba
- (France) Ismail Bouneb
- (France) Mathys Detourbet
- (France) Léo Milliner
- (France) Fode Sylla
- (Georgia (country)) Nikoloz Chikovani
- (Georgia (country)) Giorgi Gogsadze
- (Georgia (country)) George Nikolaishvili
- (Georgia (country)) Alksandre Peikrishvili
- (Georgia (country)) Vakhtang Salia
- (Germany) Maximilian Herwerth
- (Germany) Max Moerstedt
- (Germany) Kjell Wätjen
- (Gibraltar) Lee Chipolina
- (Greece) Adriano Bregou
- (Greece) Dimitrios Chatsidis
- (Greece) Anestis Mythou
- (Greece) Ilias Panagakos
- (Greece) Konstantinos Polykratis
- (Hungary) Kevin Mondovics
- (Hungary) Benedek Simon
- (Hungary) Szilard Szabó
- (Hungary) Zétény Varga
- (Hungary) Mátyás Vidnyánszky
- (Iceland) Daniel Ingi Johannesson
- (Iceland) Daði Berg Jónsson
- (Israel) Eyad Khalaily
- (Israel) Roey Magor
- (Israel) Yuval Ranon
- (Israel) Daniel Tishler
- (Italy) Lorenzo Riccio
- (Kazakhstan) Yerassyl Sarsenbayev
- (Kosovo) Eliot Bujupi
- (Kosovo) Edion Gashi
- (Kosovo) Elvir Gashijan
- (Latvia) Roberts Bočs
- (Latvia) Helvijs Joksts
- (Latvia) Valters Purs
- (Latvia) Markuss Strods
- (Lithuania) Jokūbas Jančauskas
- (Luxembourg) Christophe Andrade Brites
- (Luxembourg) Diego Duarte
- (Luxembourg) Liam Nurenberg
- (Luxembourg) Malik Pinheiro
- (Malta) Nicholas Agius
- (Malta) Thomas Melillo
- (Moldova) Ovidiu David
- (Moldova) Nicolae Sula
- (Montenegro) Andrija Bulatović
- (Montenegro) Marko Tadić
- (Montenegro) Danilo Vukanić
- (Netherlands) Don-Angelo Konadu
- (Netherlands) Ayoub Oufkir
- (Netherlands) Givairo Read
- (Netherlands) Zépiqueno Redmond
- (Netherlands) Aymen Sliti
- (Netherlands) Mark Verkuijl
- (Northern Ireland) Braiden Graham
- (Northern Ireland) Matthew Orr
- (North Macedonia) Dimitar Danev
- (North Macedonia) Matej Gashtarov
- (Norway) Fredrik Ardraa
- (Norway) Karsten Ekorness
- (Norway) Troy Nyhammer
- (Norway) Gustav Nyheim
- (Norway) Mathias Øren
- (Norway) Jesper Reitan-Sunde
- (Norway) Adrian Kurd Rønning
- (Poland) Karol Borys
- (Poland) Michał Gurgul
- (Poland) Szymon Kądziołka
- (Poland) Igor Orlikowski
- (Poland) Patryk Paryzek
- (Poland) Dominik Szala
- (Poland) Maksymilian Sznaucner
- (Portugal) Gil Martins
- (Portugal) Francisco Neto
- (Portugal) Gabriel Silva
- (Republic of Ireland) Stanley Ashbee
- (Republic of Ireland) Aarón Ochoa
- (Republic of Ireland) Nickson Okosun
- (Republic of Ireland) Naj Razi
- (Scotland) Rory MacLeod
- (Scotland) Dylan Watret
- (Serbia) Andrej Bačanin
- (Serbia) Lazar Jovanović
- (Serbia) Nikola Simić
- (Serbia) Uroš Sremčević
- (Serbia) Ognjen Ugrešić
- (Slovakia) Samuel Dikoš
- (Slovakia) Oliver Kubka
- (Slovenia) Tomaž Brdik
- (Slovenia) Niko Grlić
- (Slovenia) David Pejičić
- (Slovenia) Mark Šerbec
- (Spain) Diego Aguado
- (Spain) Daniel Díaz Gándara
- (Spain) Pablo García
- (Spain) Peio Huestamendia
- (Spain) Jano Monserrate
- (Spain) Gonzalo Pastor
- (Spain) Pau Prim
- (Sweden) Elias Pihlström
- (Switzerland) Jason Parente
- (Switzerland) Alessandro Romano
- (Switzerland) Felix Tsimba
- (Turkey) Yusuf Akçiçek
- (Turkey) Doğanay Avcı
- (Turkey) Boran Başkan
- (Turkey) Hüseyin Ertürk
- (Turkey) Efe Korkut
- (Turkey) Arda Usluoğlu
- (Turkey) İsak Vural
- (Ukraine) Matviy Ponomarenko
- (Wales) Oliver Bostock
- (Wales) Freddie Issaka
- (Wales) Elliot Myles

1 own goal

- (Estonia) Oscar Pihela (against Georgia)
- (Iceland) Jón Sölvi Símonarson (against Denmark)
- (Iceland) Solvi Stefansson (against Ireland)
- (Liechtenstein) Jonas Weissenhofer (against France)
- (Moldova) Serghei Obiscalov (against Iceland)
- (North Macedonia) Naim Sinanov (against Slovakia)
- (Serbia) Nikola Simić (against Israel)
- (Slovenia) Luka Topalović (against the Netherlands)
- (Spain) Raúl Jiménez Latorre (against Kosovo)
- (Sweden) Noel Sernelius (against Norway)
