= 2024–25 in Albanian football =

Football in Albania
- Season: 2024–25

Men's football
- Kategoria Superiore: Egnatia
- Kategoria e Parë: Vora
- Kategoria e Dytë: Iliria
- Kategoria e Tretë: Bylis B
- Albanian Cup: Dinamo City
- Albanian Supercup: Egnatia

Women's football
- Kategoria Superiore Femra: Vllaznia

== National teams ==
=== Men's senior ===
==== Results and fixtures ====
===== 2024–25 UEFA Nations League =====
====== Group B1 ======
Pos	Team	Pld	W	D	L	GF	GA	GD	Pts	Promotion, qualification or relegation	(Czech Republic)	(Ukraine)	(Georgia (country))	(Albania)
1	Czech Republic (P)	6	3	2	1	9	8	+1	11	Promotion to League A	—	3–2	2–1	2–0
2	Ukraine	6	2	2	2	8	8	0	8	Qualification for promotion play-offs	1–1	—	1–0	1–2
3	Georgia (O)	6	2	1	3	7	6	+1	7 (Note: Tied on head-to-head results. Overall goal difference: Georgia +1, Albania –2.)	Qualification for relegation play-offs	4–1	1–1	—	0–1
4	Albania (R)	6	2	1	3	4	6	−2	7	Relegation to League C	0–0	1–2	0–1	—

Source: UEFA
Rules for classification: Tiebreakers
(O) Play-off winners; (P) Promoted; (R) Relegated
Notes:

7 September 2024 1	Ukraine	1–2	Albania	Prague
20:45 CEST	Konoplya 49'	Report	Ismajli 54'; Asani 66'	Stadium: Stadion Letná; Attendance: 15,500; Referee: Luis Godinho (Portugal)

10 September 2024 2	Albania	0–1	Georgia	Tirana
20:45 CEST		Report	Kochorashvili 71'	Stadium: Arena Kombëtare; Attendance: 20,400; Referee: Erik Lambrechts (Belgium)

11 October 2024 3	Czech Republic	2–0	Albania	Prague
20:45 CEST	Chorý 3', 63'	Report		Stadium: Stadion Letná; Attendance: 17,823; Referee: Benoît Bastien (France)

14 October 2024 4	Georgia	0–1	Albania	Tbilisi
20:00 UTC+4		Report	Asllani 48'	Stadium: Mikheil Meskhi Stadium; Attendance: 19,981; Referee: Danny Makkelie (Netherlands)

16 November 2024 5	Albania	0–0	Czech Republic	Tirana
20:45 CET		Report		Stadium: Arena Kombëtare; Attendance: 20,800; Referee: Sandro Schärer (Switzerland)

19 November 2024 6	Albania	1–2	Ukraine	Tirana
20:45 CET	Bajrami 75' (pen.)	Report	Zinchenko 5'; Yaremchuk 10'	Stadium: Arena Kombëtare; Attendance: 20,547; Referee: João Pinheiro (Portugal)

===== 2026 FIFA World Cup qualification =====
====== Group K ======
Pos	Team	Pld	W	D	L	GF	GA	GD	Pts	Qualification	(England)	(Albania)	(Serbia)	(Latvia)	(Andorra)
1	England	3	3	0	0	6	0	+6	9	Qualification for 2026 FIFA World Cup	—	2–0	13 Nov	3–0	6 Sep
2	Albania	4	1	2	1	4	3	+1	5	Advance to play-offs	16 Nov	—	0–0	9 Sep	3–0
3	Serbia	2	1	1	0	3	0	+3	4		9 Sep	11 Oct	—	16 Nov	3–0
4	Latvia	3	1	1	1	2	4	−2	4		14 Oct	1–1	6 Sep	—	11 Oct
5	Andorra	4	0	0	4	0	8	−8	0		0–1	13 Nov	14 Oct	0–1	—

Updated to match(es) played on 10 June 2025. Source: FIFA, UEFA
Rules for classification: Tiebreakers

21 March 2025 1	England	2–0	Albania	London
19:45 UTC+0	Lewis-Skelly 20'; Kane 77'	Report (FIFA); Report (UEFA)		Stadium: Wembley Stadium; Attendance: 82,378; Referee: Alejandro Hernández Hernández (Spain)

24 March 2025 2	Albania	3–0	Andorra	Tirana
20:45 CET	Manaj 9', 19'; Uzuni 90+2'	Report (FIFA); Report (UEFA)		Stadium: Arena Kombëtare; Attendance: 17,183; Referee: Sebastian Gishamer (Austria)

7 June 2025 3	Albania	0–0	Serbia	Tirana
20:45 CET		Report (FIFA); Report (UEFA)		Stadium: Arena Kombëtare; Attendance: 20,427; Referee: Davide Massa (Italy)

10 June 2025 4	Latvia	1–1	Albania	Riga
21:45 UTC+3	Černomordijs 45+4'	Report (FIFA); Report (UEFA)	Černomordijs 29' (o.g.)	Stadium: Skonto Stadium; Attendance: 6,083; Referee: Halil Umut Meler (Turkey)

=== Women's senior ===
==== Results and fixtures ====
===== UEFA Women's Euro 2025 qualifying =====
====== Play-offs ======
25 October 2025	Albania	0–5	Norway	Shkodër
16:00 CEST		Report	Maanum 9'; Bergsvand 23', 44'; Hegerberg 62'; Hoxhaj 74' (o.g.)	Stadium: Loro Boriçi Stadium; Attendance: 2,185; Referee: Ana Maria Terteleac (Romania)

29 October 2025	Norway	9–0	Albania	Oslo
19:00 CEST		Report	Maanum 18', 52', 62', 65'; Naalsund 29'; Hegerberg 44'; Gaupset 75'; Reiten 81' (pen.); Bøe Risa 90+1' (pen.)	Stadium: Ullevaal Stadion; Attendance: 7,682; Referee: Michalina Diakow (Poland)

===== 2025 UEFA Women's Nations League =====
====== Group B4 ======
Pos	Team	Pld	W	D	L	GF	GA	GD	Pts	Promotion, qualification or relegation	(Ukraine)	(Czech Republic)	(Albania)	(Croatia)
1	Ukraine (P)	6	4	1	1	8	6	+2	13 (Note: Head-to-head points: Ukraine 4, Czech Republic 1.)	Promotion to League A	—	1–0	2–1	2–1
2	Czech Republic	6	4	1	1	17	4	+13	13	Qualification for promotion play-offs	1–1	—	5–1	5–0
3	Albania	6	2	0	4	10	12	−2	6	Qualification for relegation play-offs	1–2	1–2	—	4–0
4	Croatia (R)	6	1	0	5	4	17	−13	3	Relegation to League C	2–0	0–4	1–2	—

Source: UEFA
Rules for classification: Tiebreakers
(P) Promoted; (R) Relegated
Notes:

21 February 2025 1	Albania	1–2	Ukraine	Durrës
18:00 CET	Berisha 90+5'	Report	Ovdiychuk 31'; Kozlova 48'	Stadium: Niko Dovana Stadium; Attendance: 2,520; Referee: Franziska Wildfeuer (Germany)

25 February 2025 2	Czech Republic	5–1	Albania	České Budějovice
17:30 CET	Svitková 34', 42'; Bartoňová 45+2', 62'; Stašková 60'	Report	Doçi 24' (pen.)	Stadium: Střelecký ostrov Attendance: 2,025; Referee: Kristina Georgieva (Bulgaria)

4 April 2025 3	Albania	4–0	Croatia	Shkodër
16:00 CEST	Berisha 14'; Hila 24'; Doçi 72'; Hamonikaj 90+1'	Report		Stadium: Loro Boriçi Stadium; Attendance: 436; Referee: Alexandra Collin (France)

8 April 2025 4	Croatia	1–2	Albania	Zagreb
16:00 CEST	Slipčević 11'		Berisha 32'; Balog 71' (o.g.)	Stadium: Sport Centre Rudes; Attendance: 377; Referee: Maria Marotta (Italy)

30 May 2025 5	Ukraine	2–1	Albania	Varaždin
19:00 CEST	Ovdiychuk 19'; Basanska 41'		Berisha 10'	Stadium: Stadion Varteks; Attendance: 50; Referee: Caroline Lanssens (Belgium)

3 June 2025 6	Albania	1–2	Czech Republic	Shkodër
19:00 CEST	Berisha 45+2'	Report	Bartoňová 87' (pen.); Khýrová 90'	Stadium: Loro Boriçi Stadium; Attendance: 483; Referee: Michalina Diakow (Poland)

=== Men's under-21 ===
==== Results and fixtures ====
===== Friendlies =====
15 November 2024	Albania	1–1	Moldova	Vorë
	Rashica 10' (pen.)	Report	Costin 79'	Stadium: Vora Stadium

18 November 2024	Albania	4–0	Moldova	Vorë
	Rashica 16'; Ismaili 54'; Rama 87'; Daka 90+3'	Report		Stadium: Vora Stadium

21 March 2025	Greece	0–0	Albania	Serres
16:00		Report		Stadium: Serres Municipal Stadium

25 March 2025	Luxembourg	1–0	Albania	Parc Housen
18:30	Videira 57'	Report		Stadium: Stade Georges Wohlfart

5 June 2025	Hungary	1–2	Albania	Kecskemét
19:30	Drágoner 74'	Report	Dodaj 46'; Osmani 76'	Stadium: Széktói Stadion

8 June 2025	Turkey	1–0	Albania	Istanbul
19:00	Kılıçsoy 27'	Report		Stadium: Atatürk Olympic Stadium

===== 2025 UEFA European Under-21 Championship qualification =====
====== Group E ======
Pos	Team	Pld	W	D	L	GF	GA	GD	Pts	Qualification	Romania	Finland	Switzerland	Albania	Montenegro	Armenia
1	Romania	10	7	1	2	23	10	+13	22	Final tournament	—	1–0	3–1	5–0	1–0	2–0
2	Finland	10	6	2	2	21	8	+13	20	Play-offs	2–0	—	1–2	4–1	2–1	6–0
3	Switzerland	10	5	3	2	21	12	+9	18		2–2	1–1	—	1–2	4–2	5–0
4	Albania	10	5	1	4	12	17	−5	16		3–2	0–0	1–3	—	2–0	1–0
5	Montenegro	10	2	1	7	8	19	−11	7		2–6	1–2	0–2	1–0	—	0–0
6	Armenia	10	0	2	8	2	21	−19	2		0–1	1–3	0–0	1–2	0–1	—

Source: UEFA
Rules for classification: Tiebreakers

6 September 2024	Switzerland	1–2	Albania	Lausanne
19:30 CEST	Surdez 16'	Report	Pajaziti 18', 69'	Stadium: Stade de la Tuilière; Attendance: 5,757; Referee: Atilla Karaoğlan (Turkey)

15 October 2024	Albania	1–0	Armenia	Tirana
18:00 CET	Aventisian 57' (o.g.)	Report		Stadium: Arena Kombëtare; Attendance: 2,500; Referee: Kyriakos Athanasiou (Cyprus)

=== Men's under-19 ===
==== Results and fixtures ====
===== Friendlies =====
9 August 2024	Albania	4–0	Liechtenstein	Tirana
17:30	Malaj 19', 50'; Prendi 45'; Hasani 51'	Report		Stadium: Shtëpia e Futbollit

11 August 2024	Albania	6–0	Liechtenstein	Tirana
10:00	Belloj 27'; Bastari 39'; Tosku 47'; Malaj 54'; Noreci 65'; Duro 69'	Report		Stadium: Shtëpia e Futbollit

6 September 2024	Turkey	1–0	Albania	Riva
	Usluoğlu 53'	Report		Stadium: TFF Riva Facility

8 September 2024	Turkey	1–0	Albania	Riva
	Ünyay 84'	Report		Stadium: TFF Riva Facility

11 October 2024	Montenegro	2–3	Albania	Tuz
	Perović 43'; Vukanić 77'	Report	Hasani 30'; Vraniçi 47'; Nuredini 60'	Stadium: Stadiumi Tushko Pole

13 October 2024	Albania	2–0	Montenegro	Shkodër
	Jaku 42'; Gjyla 57'	Report		Stadium: Reshit Rusi Stadium

21 March 2025	Albania	0–0	North Macedonia	Korçë
		Report		Stadium: Skënderbeu Stadium

23 March 2025	Albania	1–0	North Macedonia	Korçë
	L. Krasniqi 73'	Report		Stadium: Skënderbeu Stadium

6 June 2025	Bulgaria	0–0	Albania	Etropole
		Report		Stadium: Chavdar Stadium

9 June 2025	Bulgaria	2–2	Albania	Etropole
	Idriz 10'; Todorov 90+2'	Report	Nuredini 9'; Hoxha 69'	Stadium: Chavdar Stadium

===== 2025 UEFA European Under-19 Championship qualification =====
====== Group 11 ======
Pos	Team	Pld	W	D	L	GF	GA	GD	Pts	Qualification
1	Denmark	3	3	0	0	8	2	+6	9	Elite round
2	Israel	3	2	0	1	11	4	+7	6	Elite round
3	Northern Ireland	3	1	0	2	2	7	−5	3	
4	Albania (H)	3	0	0	3	0	8	−8	0	

Source: UEFA
Rules for classification: Tiebreakers
(H) Hosts

13 November 2024	Israel	6–0	Albania	Elbasan
	Zoabi 4'; Hazan 18', 55' (pen.); Khalaili 28'; Oli 52'; Magor 75'	Report		Stadium: Elbasan Arena; Referee: Oleksii Derevinskyi (Ukraine)

16 November 2024	Denmark	1–0	Albania	Elbasan
	Jensen 37'	Report		Stadium: Elbasan Arena; Referee: Joonas Jaanovits (Estonia)

19 November 2024	Albania	0–1	Northern Ireland	Elbasan
		Report	Graham 88'	Stadium: Elbasan Arena; Referee: Joonas Jaanovits (Estonia)

=== Women's under-19 ===
==== Results and fixtures ====
===== 2025 UEFA Women's Under-19 Championship qualification =====
27 November 2024	Montenegro	1–2	Albania	Tirana
13:30	Doknić 48'	Report	Qose 30'; Ndoj 68'	Stadium: Arena Kombëtare; Referee: Laura Mauricio (Switzerland)

30 November 2024	Albania	3–0	Moldova	Tirana
13:30	Vata 6'; Burac 38' (o.g.); Ndoj 52'	Report		Stadium: Arena Kombëtare; Referee: Laura Mauricio (Switzerland)

3 December 2024	Albania	1–2	Belarus	Tirana
13:30	Vasa 89'	Report	Putsykovich 27'; Kavaliova 83'	Stadium: Arena Kombëtare; Referee: Galiya Echeva (Bulgaria)

=== Men's under-17 ===
==== Results and fixtures ====
===== Friendlies =====
4 September 2024	Albania	3–1	Luxembourg	Vorë
	Gecaj 28'; Kulla 45', 83' (pen.)	Report	Duarte 65'	Stadium: Stadiumi Vora

6 September 2024	Albania	0–3	Luxembourg	Tirana
		Report	Polfer 44', 51'; Rodrigues 56'	Stadium: Shtëpia e Futbollit

15 November 2024	Albania	3–2	Poland	Tirana
	Kulla 53', 66'; Vogli 79'	Report	Kaczowka 44', 55'	Stadium: Shtëpia e Futbollit

18 November 2024	Albania	0–4	Poland	Tirana
		Report	Kaczowka 55'; Śledziński 78', 90'; Falkiewicz 87'	Stadium: Shtëpia e Futbollit

===== 2025 UEFA European Under-17 Championship qualification =====
9 October 2024	Albania	1–1	Croatia	Tirana
	Kulla 66'	Report	Kurti 28' (o.g.)	Stadium: Air Albania Stadium; Referee: Zorbay Küçük (Türkiye)

12 October 2024	Netherlands	5–0	Albania	Tirana
	Wijks 11'; Ünüvar 21'; Ouarghi 59'; Nash 81'; Beerens 84'	Report		Stadium: Air Albania Stadium; Referee: Lukasz Kuzma (Poland)

15 October 2024	Faroe Islands	0–1	Albania	Rrogozhinë
		Report	Kulla 57'	Stadium: Egnatia Arena; Referee: Matthew MacDermid (Scotland)

19 March 2025	Azerbaijan	1–4	Albania	Elbasan
15:00	Rzayev 47'	Report	Gjoka 7', 53', 64'; Kulla 76'	Stadium: Elbasan Arena; Referee: Jérémy Muller (Luxembourg)

25 March 2025	Albania	1–2	Wales	Tirana
15:00	Myrtaj 20'	Report	Grainger 63', 76'	Stadium: Shtëpia e Futbollit; Referee: Igor Bosca (Moldova)

19 May 2025	Albania	0–4	Portugal	Tirana
18:00		Report	Quintas 36'; Mide 68' (pen.); Cabral 81'; Soares 90+2'	Stadium: Arena Kombëtare; Referee: Patrik Kolarić (Croatia)

22 May 2025	Albania	0–4	Germany	Elbasan
18:00		Report	Mensah 7'; Staff 20'; Mike 66'; Oteng-Mensah 85' (pen.)	Stadium: Elbasan Arena; Referee: Kamal Umudlu (Azerbaijan)

25 May 2025	France	4–0	Albania	Elbasan
20:30	Malonga 33'; Coulibaly 51'; N'Guessan 66', 79'	Report		Stadium: Elbasan Arena; Referee: Oleksiy Derevinskyi (Ukraine)

== UEFA competitions ==
=== UEFA Champions League ===
==== Qualifying phases ====
===== Egnatia =====
First qualifying round
Team 1	Agg.	Team 2	1st leg	2nd leg
Borac Banja Luka (Bosnia and Herzegovina)	2–2 (4–1 p)	(Albania) Egnatia	1–0	1–2 (a.e.t.)

=== UEFA Conference League ===
==== Qualifying phases ====
===== Partizani =====
First qualifying round
Team 1	Agg.	Team 2	1st leg	2nd leg
Partizani (Albania)	3–2	(Malta) Marsaxlokk	1–1	2–1

Second qualifying round
Team 1	Agg.	Team 2	1st leg	2nd leg
Iberia 1999 (Georgia (country))	2–0	(Albania) Partizani	2–0	0–0

===== Tirana =====
First qualifying round
Team 1	Agg.	Team 2	1st leg	2nd leg
Torpedo Kutaisi (Georgia (country))	2–1	(Albania) Tirana	1–1	1–0

===== Vllaznia =====
First qualifying round
Team 1	Agg.	Team 2	1st leg	2nd leg
Valur (Iceland)	6–2	(Albania) Vllaznia	2–2	4–0

=== UEFA Women's Champions League ===
==== Qualifying rounds ====
===== Vllaznia =====
Semi-finals
4 September
(Albania) Vllaznia	3
(Georgia (country)) Lanchkhuti	0
4 September
(Austria) St. Pölten	5
(Azerbaijan) Neftchi Baku	0

Final
7 September
(Albania) Vllaznia	0
(Austria) St. Pölten	1
Third place
7 September
(Georgia (country)) Lanchkhuti	2
(Azerbaijan) Neftchi Baku	1

== League competitions ==
League Division	Promoted to league ▲	Relegated from league ▼
Kategoria Superiore	Elbasani ▲; Bylis ▲	Erzeni ▼; Kukësi ▼
Kategoria e Parë	Valbona ▲	Luzi 2008 ▼; Tomori ▼
Kategoria e Dytë	Basania ▲; Memaliaj ▲	Shënkolli ▼

=== Kategoria Superiore ===
Pos	Team	Pld	W	D	L	GF	GA	GD	Pts	Qualification or relegation
1	Egnatia (C)	36	16	11	9	47	30	+17	59	Qualification for the Final four round
2	Vllaznia	36	15	12	9	54	39	+15	57	Qualification for the Final four round
3	Dinamo City	36	14	13	9	49	41	+8	55	Qualification for the Final four round
4	Partizani	36	13	14	9	38	33	+5	53	Qualification for the Final four round
5	Elbasani	36	11	17	8	40	38	+2	50	
6	Teuta	36	10	14	12	29	42	−13	44	
7	Bylis	36	11	9	16	33	50	−17	42	
8	Tirana (O)	36	7	18	11	43	44	−1	39	Qualification for the relegation play-off
9	Skënderbeu (R)	36	9	11	16	35	45	−10	38	Relegation to the 2025–26 Kategoria e Parë
10	Laçi (R)	36	8	13	15	31	37	−6	37	Relegation to the 2025–26 Kategoria e Parë

Source: Albanian Football Association
Rules for classification: 1) Points; 2) Head-to-head points; 3) Head-to-head goal difference; 4) Head-to-head goals scored; 5) Goal difference; 6) Goals scored; 7) Draw.
(C) Champions; (O) Play-off winners; (R) Relegated

=== Kategoria e Parë ===
Pos	Team	Pld	W	D	L	GF	GA	GD	Pts	Promotion or relegation
1	Vora (C, P)	33	24	4	5	55	24	+31	76	Promotion to 2025–26 Kategoria Superiore
2	Flamurtari (P)	33	23	6	4	62	21	+41	75	Promotion to 2025–26 Kategoria Superiore
3	Besa	33	22	8	3	54	18	+36	74	Promotion play-off to 2025–26 Kategoria Superiore
4	Burreli	33	16	10	7	36	22	+14	58	Promotion play-off to 2025–26 Kategoria Superiore
5	Pogradeci	33	14	7	12	33	35	−2	49	Promotion play-off to 2025–26 Kategoria Superiore
6	Apolonia	33	11	12	10	45	32	+13	45	Promotion play-off to 2025–26 Kategoria Superiore
7	Lushnja	33	13	5	15	39	41	−2	44	
8	Korabi	33	12	5	16	35	48	−13	41	
9	Kastrioti (O)	33	11	5	17	35	49	−14	38	Relegation play-out to 2025–26 Kategoria e Dytë
10	Kukësi (O)	33	8	4	21	29	56	−27	28	Relegation play-out to 2025–26 Kategoria e Dytë
11	Valbona (R)	33	3	7	23	29	59	−30	16	Relegation to 2025–26 Kategoria e Dytë
12	Erzeni (R)	33	2	5	26	16	63	−47	11	Relegation to 2025–26 Kategoria e Dytë

Rules for classification: 1) Points; 2) Head-to-head points; 3) Head-to-head goal difference; 4) Head-to-head goals scored; 5) Goal difference; 6) Goals scored; 7) Draw.
(C) Champions; (O) Play-off winners; (P) Promoted; (R) Relegated

Semi-finals
Besa	1
Apolonia	1
Burreli	0
Pogradeci	1

Final
Besa	0
Pogradeci	1

=== Kategoria e Dytë ===
Pos	Team	Pld	W	D	L	GF	GA	GD	Pts	Promotion or relegation
1	Iliria (C, P)	22	18	3	1	56	12	+44	57	Promotion to 2025–26 Kategoria e Parë
2	Luzi 2008	22	18	2	2	53	16	+37	56	Play-off promotion to 2025–26 Kategoria e Parë
3	Sopoti	22	16	3	3	46	20	+26	51	Play-off promotion to 2025–26 Kategoria e Parë
4	Tërbuni	22	11	5	6	39	28	+11	38	Play-off promotion to 2025–26 Kategoria e Parë
5	Veleçiku	22	10	4	8	38	26	+12	34	Play-off promotion to 2025–26 Kategoria e Parë
6	Besëlidhja	22	10	4	8	31	29	+2	34	
7	Albanët	22	7	3	12	48	48	0	24	
8	Naftëtari	22	6	4	12	29	31	−2	22	
9	Adriatiku	22	6	4	12	34	44	−10	22	
10	Basania	22	5	6	11	24	39	−15	21	
11	Gramshi (O)	22	3	5	14	27	50	−23	14	Play-off relegation to 2025–26 Kategoria e Tretë
12	Murlani (R)	22	0	1	21	10	92	−82	1	Relegation to 2025–26 Kategoria e Tretë

Rules for classification: 1) points; 2) head-to-head points; 3) head-to-head goal difference; 4) goal difference; 5) number of goals scored; 6) draw. (Head-to-head record is applied for clubs with the same number of points only once all matches between said clubs have been played.)
(C) Champions; (O) Play-off winners; (P) Promoted; (R) Relegated

Pos	Team	Pld	W	D	L	GF	GA	GD	Pts	Promotion or relegation
1	Luftëtari (P)	20	16	3	1	56	11	+45	51	Promotion to 2025–26 Kategoria e Parë
2	Oriku	20	16	3	1	37	5	+32	51	Play-off promotion to 2025–26 Kategoria e Parë
3	Tomori	20	11	2	7	39	21	+18	35	Play-off promotion to 2025–26 Kategoria e Parë
4	Devolli	20	10	4	6	39	38	+1	34	Play-off promotion to 2025–26 Kategoria e Parë
5	Butrinti	20	10	3	7	35	19	+16	33	Play-off promotion to 2025–26 Kategoria e Parë
6	Delvina	20	7	5	8	32	31	+1	26	
7	Shkumbini	20	5	5	10	24	38	−14	20	
8	Maliqi	20	6	2	12	27	38	−11	20	
9	Këlcyra	20	5	5	10	28	40	−12	20	
10	Turbina (R)	20	6	1	13	22	34	−12	19	Play-off relegation to 2025–26 Kategoria e Tretë
11	Memaliaj (R)	20	1	1	18	15	79	−64	4	Relegation to 2025–26 Kategoria e Tretë

Rules for classification: 1) points; 2) head-to-head points; 3) head-to-head goal difference; 4) goal difference; 5) number of goals scored; 6) draw. (Head-to-head record is applied for clubs with the same number of points only once all matches between said clubs have been played.)
(P) Promoted; (R) Relegated

==== Results ====
Home \ Away	BUT	DEL	DEV	KËL	LUF	MAL	MEM	ORI	SHK	TOM	TUR
Butrinti	—	2–1	4–0	3–0	3–4	4–1	6–0	0–0	0–0	1–3	2–0
Delvina	2–0	—	1–2	2–2	0–0	1–0	3–1	0–2	4–3	1–0	3–0
Devolli	0–0	2–2	—	5–1	1–4	3–2	5–1	2–1	2–1	2–1	1–0
Këlcyra	2–1	2–2	4–3	—	0–5	0–1	6–0	0–2	0–2	0–0	2–1
Luftëtari	2–1	2–1	4–1	2–0	—	6–1	5–1	0–0	6–1	1–0	4–0
Maliqi	0–2	2–2	1–2	4–2	1–0	—	5–0	0–1	0–0	1–5	2–1
Memaliaj	0–3	2–5	1–3	3–2	0–5	1–2	—	0–7	0–3	1–4	0–3
Oriku	1–0	1–0	4–0	2–1	0–0	1–0	4–1	—	1–0	4–0	2–0
Shkumbini	0–1	2–1	2–2	1–1	0–4	1–0	2–2	1–2	—	0–3	1–3
Tomori	2–0	3–0	2–1	1–1	0–1	4–3	4–0	0–1	4–1	—	3–0
Turbina	1–2	3–1	2–2	0–2	0–1	2–1	2–1	0–1	2–3	2–0	—

Legend: Blue = home team win; Yellow = draw; Red = away team win.
For upcoming matches, an "a" indicates there is an article about the rivalry between the two participants.

Semi-finals
Luzi 2008	2
Veleçiku	0
Sopoti	2
Tërbuni	0

Final
Luzi 2008	4
Sopoti	0

Semi-finals
Oriku	1
Butrinti	1
Tomori	2
Devolli	1

Final
Oriku	3
Tomori	2

=== Kategoria e Tretë ===
Pos	Team	Pld	W	D	L	GF	GA	GD	Pts	Promotion
1	Eagle FA (P)	14	10	4	0	32	11	+21	34	Promotion to 2025–26 Kategoria e Dytë
2	Partizani B (O, P)	14	10	2	2	48	11	+37	32	Play-off promotion to 2025–26 Kategoria e Dytë
3	Shiroka	14	8	2	4	31	17	+14	26	
4	Bulqiza	14	7	2	5	31	25	+6	23	
5	Klosi	14	6	2	6	25	28	−3	20	
6	Europiani	14	4	4	6	16	22	−6	16	
7	Himara	14	1	1	12	14	48	−34	4	
8	Olimpic Shkodra	14	1	1	12	12	47	−35	4	

Rules for classification: 1) points; 2) head-to-head points; 3) head-to-head goal difference; 4) goal difference; 5) number of goals scored; 6) draw. (Head-to-head record is applied for clubs with the same number of points only once all matches between said clubs have been played.)
(O) Play-off winners; (P) Promoted

Pos	Team	Pld	W	D	L	GF	GA	GD	Pts	Promotion
1	Bylis B (C, P)	14	12	0	2	42	20	+22	36	Promotion to 2025–26 Kategoria e Dytë
2	Albpetrol	14	10	3	1	35	11	+24	33	Play-off promotion to 2025–26 Kategoria e Dytë
3	Gramozi	14	9	3	2	34	15	+19	30	
4	Osumi	14	6	0	8	21	25	−4	18	
5	Labëria	14	5	2	7	32	25	+7	17	
6	Përmeti	14	4	3	7	20	27	−7	15	
7	Skrapari	14	2	1	11	12	45	−33	7	
8	Tepelena	14	2	0	12	16	44	−28	6	

Rules for classification: 1) points; 2) head-to-head points; 3) head-to-head goal difference; 4) goal difference; 5) number of goals scored; 6) draw. (Head-to-head record is applied for clubs with the same number of points only once all matches between said clubs have been played.)
(C) Champions; (P) Promoted

=== Kategoria Superiore Femra ===
Pos	Team	Pld	W	D	L	GF	GA	GD	Pts	Qualification
1	Vllaznia	18	17	0	1	159	4	+155	51	Qualification for the Final Four Round
2	Gramshi	18	15	1	2	140	6	+134	46	Qualification for the Final Four Round
3	Apolonia	18	15	0	3	127	9	+118	45	Qualification for the Final Four Round
4	Partizani	18	11	2	5	89	18	+71	35	Qualification for the Final Four Round
5	Egnatia	18	8	2	8	45	62	−17	26	Participates in Relegation Group
6	Kinostudio	18	6	5	7	38	58	−20	23	Participates in Relegation Group
7	Laçi	18	4	2	12	18	110	−92	14	Participates in Relegation Group
8	Tirana	18	3	2	13	13	96	−83	11	Participates in Relegation Group
9	Teuta	18	2	2	14	19	143	−124	8	Participates in Relegation Group
10	Lushnja	18	0	2	16	4	146	−142	2	Participates in Relegation Group

Updated to match(es) played on 8 May 2025. Source: fshf.org
Rules for classification: 1) Points; 2) Head-to-head points; 3) Head-to-head goal difference; 4) Head-to-head goals scored; 5) Goal difference; 6) Goals scored; 7) Draw.

== Cup competitions ==
=== Albanian Cup ===
==== Final ====
1 May 2025
18:00 CEST

Egnatia	2−2 (a.e.t.)	Dinamo City
Guindo 45+3'; Bakayoko 90+5'		Itodo 17', 61'
Penalties
Aleksi (penalty missed); Bakayoko (penalty scored); Ujka (penalty scored); Zejnullai (penalty scored); Xhemajli (penalty scored); Yahaya (penalty missed)	4−5	(penalty scored) Aliji; (penalty scored) Qardaku; (penalty missed) Meksi; (penalty scored) Teqja; (penalty scored) Zabërgja; (penalty scored) Dita

Elbasan Arena, Elbasan
Referee: Eldorjan Hamiti

=== Albanian Supercup ===
26 December 2024
19:00 CET

Egnatia	2–0	Kukësi
Ujka 19'; Bakayoko 84'

Arena Kombëtare, Tirana
Referee: Daniel Vrapi
