= Elias Pihlström =

Swedish footballer (born 2006)

Personal information
- Full name: Erik Elias Pihlström
- Date of birth: 31 August 2006 (age 20)
- Place of birth: Laxå, Sweden
- Position: Winger

Team information
- Current team: FC Lugano
- Number: 24

Youth career
- –2022: Örebro SK

Senior career*
Years	Team	Apps	(Gls)
2023	Adolfsbergs IK	6	(2)
2024–2025	Degerfors IF	38	(4)
2025–	FC Lugano	21	(3)

International career^{‡}
2024	Sweden U19	8	(1)
2025–	Sweden U21	3	(0)
- * Club domestic league appearances and goals as of 28 September 2026 ‡ National team caps and goals as of 17:59, 4 June 2026 (UTC)

Erik Elias Pihlström (born 31 August 2006) is a Swedish professional footballer who plays as a winger for FC Lugano.

== Early life ==
Pihlström was born on 31 August 2006. Born in Laxå, Sweden, he is a native of the city.

== Club career ==
As a youth player, Pihlström joined the youth academy of Swedish side Örebro. Following his stint there, he signed for Swedish side Adolfsbergs IK in 2023, where he made six league appearances and scored two goals.

The same year, he signed for Swedish side Degerfors IF, where he made thirty-eight league appearances and scored four goals. Ahead of the 2025–26 season, he signed for Swiss side FC Lugano.

== International career ==
Pihlström is a Sweden youth international. During November 2024, he played for the Sweden men's national under-19 football team for 2025 UEFA European Under-19 Championship qualification.
