= Djoully Nzoko =

Finnish footballer (born 2007)

Personal information
- Full name: Dieudonné Djoully Nzoko
- Date of birth: 11 October 2007 (age 19)
- Place of birth: Finland
- Height: 1.75 m (5 ft 9 in)
- Position: Winger

Team information
- Current team: Jong Genk
- Number: 79

Youth career
- –2016: TPS
- 2017–2023: Inter Turku

Senior career*
Years	Team	Apps	(Gls)
2022–2024	Inter Turku II	7	(0)
2024	Inter Turku	12	(4)
2024–	Jong Genk	34	(2)

International career^{‡}
2022–2023	Finland U16	10	(3)
2023–2024	Finland U17	14	(0)
2023–	Finland U18	3	(2)
2024–	Finland U19	9	(3)
- * Club domestic league appearances and goals as of 20 April 2026 ‡ National team caps and goals as of 6 September 2025

Dieudonné Djoully Nzoko (born 11 October 2007) is a Finnish professional football player who plays as a winger for Challenger Pro League club Jong Genk. He started his professional senior career with Inter Turku in 2024 aged 16.

== Youth career ==
Nzoko grew up in Vaala neighbourhood of Turku, where he played street football with his friends. He joined a youth team of Turun Palloseura (TPS) at the age of seven and played in the youth sector of Inter Turku since he was nine years old. On 28 September 2021, he was among the five youth players to sign an academy contract with Inter. During the 2023 season, Nzoko played for the Inter under-17 team in the U17 second-tier league.

== Club career ==
=== Inter Turku ===
On 29 November 2023, at the age of 16, Nzoko signed his first professional contract with Inter Turku, on a three-year deal. He had made his senior debut with the club's reserve team in the fourth-tier Kolmonen earlier in 2022. Nzoko had attracted interest from high-profile foreign clubs, but he chose to stay in Inter and start a senior career in Veikkausliiga rather than joining a youth academy team abroad. Nzoko scored his first senior goal for Inter Turku first team on 11 February 2024, in a 3–1 win against Ekenäs IF (EIF) in Finnish League Cup. The team went on to win the league cup title, after beating Kuopion Palloseura (KuPS) in the final on penalties.

Nzoko missed the start of the 2024 season due to a minor injury, but eventually made his debut in Veikkausliiga on 31 May 2024 when aged 16, in a 3–1 home win against Haka. One week later, he scored his first Veikkausliiga goal on 7 June 2024, in a 2–0 away win against FC Lahti. During the 2024 season, he made 22 appearances and scored six goals for Inter in all competitions combined, prior to his departure in the early September.

=== Genk ===
On 6 September 2024, Nzoko signed with Challenger Pro League club Jong Genk on a three-year deal for an undisclosed fee. According to MTV News, the fee was less than €1 million. He debuted for his new team on 9 November in the Belgian second tier.

== International career ==
Nzoko has been a regular in the youth national teams, having represented Finland at under-16, under-17 and under-18 age levels.

Nzoko was part of Finland U16 squad that won the friendly tournament Baltic Cup in July 2023, scoring three goals in three matches.

On 4 October 2023, Nzoko was named in the Finland U17 squad in the 2024 UEFA U17 Euro Championship qualification tournament. In the tournament Finland drew with Ukraine and Germany 2–2 and 1–1, respectively, before winning Liechtenstein 3–0, placing 2nd in the group and advancing to the Elite round.

On 31 October 2023, Nzoko was named in the Finland U18 squad for two friendly matches against Austria U18.

In the late August 2024, Nzoko received his first call-up to the Finland U19 national team, for two friendly matches against Romania, as a preparation for the upcoming 2025 UEFA U19 Euro Championship qualifiers.

== Personal life ==
Born and raised in Finland, Nzoko is of Congolese (DRC) descent. His cousin Elohim Nzoko is also a footballer for Inter Turku U19 team.

Nzoko has named Timo Furuholm and Neymar his idols in football.

== Career statistics ==
As of 12 April 2026

Appearances and goals by club, season and competition
Club	Season	League			National cup (Note: Includes Suomen Cup and Belgian Cup)		League cup (Note: Includes Finnish League Cup)		Europe		Total	
Club	Season	Division	Apps	Goals	Apps	Goals	Apps	Goals	Apps	Goals	Apps	Goals
Inter Turku II	2022	Kolmonen	1	0	0	0	–		–		1	0
Inter Turku II	2023	Kolmonen	0	0	–		–		–		0	0
Inter Turku II	2024	Kakkonen	6	0	–		–		–		6	0
Inter Turku II	Total		7	0	0	0	0	0	0	0	7	0
Inter Turku	2024	Veikkausliiga	12	4	5	1	5	1	–		22	6
Jong Genk	2024–25	Challenger Pro League	9	0	0	0	–		–		9	0
Jong Genk	2025–26	Challenger Pro League	24	2	0	0	–		–		24	2
Jong Genk	Total		33	2	0	0	0	0	0	0	33	2
Career total			52	6	5	1	5	1	0	0	62	8

== Honours ==
Inter Turku

- Finnish League Cup: 2024

Finland U16

- Baltic Cup: 2023
