= 2024–25 Kategoria Superiore Femra =

Kategoria Superiore Femra
- Season: 2024–25
- Dates: 28 September 2024 – 18 May 2025
- Champions: Vllaznia
- Champions League: Vllaznia
- Europa Cup: Partizani
- Matches: 103
- Goals: 716 (6.95 per match)

The 2024–25 Kategoria Superiore Femra is the 16th season of women's professional football, organized by the Albanian Football Federation.

== Regular season ==
=== League table ===
Pos	Team	Pld	W	D	L	GF	GA	GD	Pts	Qualification
1	Vllaznia	18	17	0	1	159	4	+155	51	Qualification for the Final Four Round
2	Gramshi	18	15	1	2	140	6	+134	46	Qualification for the Final Four Round
3	Apolonia	18	15	0	3	127	9	+118	45	Qualification for the Final Four Round
4	Partizani	18	11	2	5	89	18	+71	35	Qualification for the Final Four Round
5	Egnatia	18	8	2	8	45	62	−17	26	Participates in Relegation Group
6	Kinostudio	18	6	5	7	38	58	−20	23	Participates in Relegation Group
7	Laçi	18	4	2	12	18	110	−92	14	Participates in Relegation Group
8	Tirana	18	3	2	13	13	96	−83	11	Participates in Relegation Group
9	Teuta	18	2	2	14	19	143	−124	8	Participates in Relegation Group
10	Lushnja	18	0	2	16	4	146	−142	2	Participates in Relegation Group

Updated to match(es) played on 8 May 2025. Source: fshf.org
Rules for classification: 1) Points; 2) Head-to-head points; 3) Head-to-head goal difference; 4) Head-to-head goals scored; 5) Goal difference; 6) Goals scored; 7) Draw.

=== Results ===
Home \ Away	APO	EGN	GRA	KIN	LAÇ	LUS	PAR	TEU	TIR	VLL
Apolonia	—	10–0	1–0	10–0	15–0	9–0	2–0	11–0	10–0	0–2
Egnatia	0–5	—	0–4	1–1	7–0	6–0	0–2	10–1	2–0	0–14
Gramshi	3–0	11–0	—	5–0	16–0	11–0	0–0	10–0	14–0	1–3
Kinostudio	0–11	1–1	0–1	—	1–1	8–0	1–5	6–3	4–0	0–9
Laçi	0–12	1–3	0–13	0–0	—	1–0	0–6	0–1	2–0	0–10
Lushnja	0–11	0–3	0–18	0–5	0–6	—	1–10	1–1	1–4	0–23
Partizani	1–5	3–0	1–4	0–0	10–0	12–0	—	14–0	6–0	0–2
Teuta	0–9	2–8	0–15	2–8	3–6	3–0	0–14	—	3–3	0–15
Tirana	0–5	0–4	0–12	1–3	3–1	1–1	0–5	1–0	—	0–10
Vllaznia	3–1	7–0	1–2	8–0	10–0	14–0	3–0	12–0	13–0	—

Updated to match(es) played on 8 May 2025. Source: fshf.org
Legend: Blue = home team win; Yellow = draw; Red = away team win.
For upcoming matches, an "a" indicates there is an article about the rivalry between the two participants.

== Final Four Round ==
=== Bracket ===
Semi-finals
Partizani	1	1	2
Gramshi	0	0	0
Apolonia	1	2	3
Vllaznia	1	3	4

Final
Vllaznia	2
Partizani	0
Third place play-off
Apolonia	1
Gramshi	2

== Semi-finals ==
First Matches

10 May 2025
15:00

Partizani	1–0	Gramshi
Victoria Thalita 34'	Report

10 May 2025
16:00

Apolonia	1–1	Vllaznia
Klea Hamonikaj 90+5'	Report	Esi Lufo 53'

Second Matches

14 May 2025
15:00

Gramshi	0–1	Partizani
	Report	Mikaela Metalla 42'

14 May 2025
17:00

Vllaznia	3–2	Apolonia
Megi Doçi 8', 71'; Aidena Mustafaj 26'	Report	Klea Hamonikaj 5', 41'

== Third Place Play-Off ==
18 May 2025
11:00

Apolonia	1–2	Gramshi
Xhesika Ndoj 45'	Report	Jehona Coka 32'; Lidiane Ribeiro Lopes 86'

== Final ==
18 May 2025
19:30

Vllaznia	2–0	Partizani
Arbiona Bajraktari 52'; Megi Doçi 72'	Report

== Championship Group ==
Pos	Team	Pld	W	D	L	GF	GA	GD	Pts	Qualification
1	Vllaznia (C)	3	2	1	0	6	3	+3	7	Champions League second qualifying round
2	Partizani	3	2	0	1	2	2	0	6	Europa Cup first qualifying round
3	Gramshi	3	1	0	2	2	3	−1	3	
4	Apolonia	3	0	1	2	4	6	−2	1	

Updated to match(es) played on 18 May 2025. Source: - Final 4
(C) Champions

=== Results ===
Home \ Away	APO	GRA	PAR	VLL
Apolonia	—	1–2	—	1–1
Gramshi	—	—	0–1	—
Partizani	—	1–0	—	—
Vllaznia	3–2	—	2–0	—

Updated to match(es) played on 18 May 2025. Source:
Legend: Blue = home team win; Yellow = draw; Red = away team win.

== Relegation Group ==
=== League Table Group A ===
Pos	Team	Pld	W	D	L	GF	GA	GD	Pts	Qualification
1	Egnatia	2	2	0	0	17	2	+15	6	
2	Laçi	2	1	0	1	6	13	−7	3	
3	Teuta	2	0	0	2	4	12	−8	0	Participates in Relegation Group Play Out Finale

Updated to match(es) played on 18 May 2025. Source:

=== Results ===
Home \ Away	EGN	LAÇ	TEU
EGN	—	—	7–1
LAÇ	1–10	—	—
TEU	—	3–5	—

Updated to match(es) played on 18 May 2025. Source:
Legend: Blue = home team win; Yellow = draw; Red = away team win.

=== League Table Group B ===
Pos	Team	Pld	W	D	L	GF	GA	GD	Pts	Qualification
1	Kinostudio	2	2	0	0	13	0	+13	6	
2	Tirana	2	1	0	1	4	1	+3	3	
3	Lushnja	2	0	0	2	0	16	−16	0	Participates in Relegation Group - Play Out Finale

Updated to match(es) played on 18 May 2025. Source:

=== Results ===
Home \ Away	TIR	KIN	LUS
TIR	—	0–1	—
KIN	—	—	12–0
LUS	0–4	—	—

Updated to match(es) played on 18 May 2025. Source:
Legend: Blue = home team win; Yellow = draw; Red = away team win.

=== Relegation Group - Play Out Finale ===
18 May 2025
13:00

Teuta	5-1	Lushnja
Erina Bajramaj 6'; Aishe Sulejmani 40', 44'; Anisa Kacorri 56'; Sea Duro 79'	Report	Erfiljona Bali 49'

== Top Scorers ==
As of 18 May 2025

Rank	Player	Club	Goals
1	(Albania) Megi Doçi	Vllaznia	83
2	(Albania) Sara Begallo	Gramshi	61
3	(Albania) Klea Hamonikaj	Apolonia	34
4	(Albania) Vanesa Levendi	Apolonia	32
5	(Albania) Klaudia Borci	Vllaznia	22
6	(Brazil) Tenutti De Souza	Apolonia	20
7	(Kosovo) Elma Kadriu	Partizani	18
8	(Brazil) Victoria Thalita	Partizani	17
9	(Kosovo) Fleta Musaj	Gramshi	16
10	(Brazil) Lidiane Ribeiro Lopes	Gramshi	15
11	(United States) Raeanne Jeanette Jones	Vllaznia	14
