= Matej Gashtarov =

Macedonian footballer

Matej Gashtarov Матеј Гаштаров
Personal information
- Full name: Matej Gashtarov
- Date of birth: 15 November 2006 (age 20)
- Place of birth: Skopje, Macedonia
- Height: 1.90 m (6 ft 3 in)
- Position: Defensive midfielder

Team information
- Current team: Red Star Belgrade
- Number: 60

Youth career
- –2024: Vardar
- 2024: Mineralac
- 2024–2026: Red Star Belgrade

Senior career*
Years	Team	Apps	(Gls)
2026–	Red Star Belgrade	12	(0)
2026	→ Borac 1926 (loan)	14	(0)

International career^{‡}
2024	North Macedonia U19	7	(2)
2025–	North Macedonia U21	11	(0)
2026–	North Macedonia	6	(0)
- * Club domestic league appearances and goals as of 21 November 2026 ‡ National team caps and goals as of 16 November 2026

Matej Gashtarov (Macedonian: Матеј Гаштаров; born 15 November 2006) is a Macedonian professional footballer who plays as a midfielder for Red Star Belgrade and the North Macedonia national team.

== Career ==
=== Early career ===
Gashtarov began playing football in the youth academy of Metalurg before joining Vardar. He later moved to Serbia and joined the youth system of Red Star Belgrade in August 2024, after spending time with Mineralac.

On 30 April 2025, he signed his first professional contract with Red Star Belgrade. During the 2024–25 season, he played for the club's under-19 team in the UEFA Youth League and was part of the squad that won the Serbian youth league title.

Gashtarov made his senior debut for Red Star Belgrade on 15 August 2025, coming on as a substitute in a Serbian SuperLiga match against Mladost Lučani.

=== Loan to Borac 1926 ===
In January 2026, Gashtarov joined Borac 1926, based in Čačak, on loan from Red Star Belgrade. Before the move, he had also spent time with Grafičar, a club associated with Red Star's player-development system.

=== Return to Red Star Belgrade ===
In July 2026, Gashtarov returned to Red Star Belgrade following his loan spell. On 9 July 2026, the club announced that he had extended his contract until 2029. He subsequently featured for the first team during the 2026–27 season.

== International career ==
Gashtarov has represented North Macedonia throughout all youth international levels, leading to a debut for North Macedonia's senior national team in the 2026–27 UEFA Nations League matches in September 2026.

== Career statistics ==
=== Club ===
As of match played 20 October 2026

Appearances and goals by club, season and competition
Club	Season	League			Serbian Cup		Europe		Other		Total	
Club	Season	Division	Apps	Goals	Apps	Goals	Apps	Goals	Apps	Goals	Apps	Goals
Red Star Belgrade	2025–26	Serbian Super Liga	1	0	0	0	0	0	—		1	0
Borac 1926	2025–26	Serbian Prva Liga	14	0	0	0	—		—		14	0
Red Star Belgrade	2026–27	Serbian SuperLiga	8	0	0	0	1	0	—		9	0
Career total			23	0	0	0	1	0	—		24	0

=== International ===
As of match played 16 November 2026

Appearances and goals by national team and year
National team	Year	Apps	Goals
North Macedonia	2026	6	0
Total		6	0

== Honours ==
Crvena Zvezda

- Serbian SuperLiga: 2025–26
- Serbian Cup: 2025–26
