= Christophe Andrade Brites =

Luxembourgish footballer (born 2007)

Personal information
- Date of birth: 8 June 2007 (age 19)
- Position: Right winger

Team information
- Current team: Jeunesse Esch
- Number: 6

Youth career
- 2015–2025: F91 Dudelange

Senior career*
| Years | Team | Apps | (Gls) |
| 2025– | Jeunesse Esch | 27 | (0) |

International career^{‡}
| 2023 | Luxembourg U16 | 3 | (0) |
| 2023–2024 | Luxembourg U17 | 4 | (1) |
| 2024– | Luxembourg | 1 | (0) |
| 2024– | Luxembourg U19 | 7 | (1) |
| 2025– | Luxembourg U21 | 1 | (0) |
- * Club domestic league appearances and goals as of 5 June 2026 ‡ National team caps and goals as of 20 October 2025

Christophe Andrade Brites (born 8 June 2007) is a Luxembourgish football player who plays as a right winger for Jeunesse Esch and the Luxembourg national team.

== International career ==
Born in Luxembourg, Andrade Brites is of Portuguese descent. He made his debut for the Luxembourg national team on 5 September 2024 in a Nations League game against the Northern Ireland at Windsor Park. He substituted Eric Veiga in the 74th minute, Northern Ireland won 2–0.
