= Nikolaj Juul-Sandberg =

Danish footballer (born 2006)

Personal information
- Full name: Nikolaj Juul-Sandberg
- Date of birth: 21 April 2006 (age 20)
- Place of birth: Middelfart, Denmark
- Position: Midfielder

Team information
- Current team: OB
- Number: 43

Youth career
- –2019: Middelfart
- 2019–2025: OB

Senior career*
Years	Team	Apps	(Gls)
2024–	OB	8	(1)
2025–2026	→ Middelfart (loan)	24	(1)

International career
2021–2020	Denmark U17	9	(0)
2022–2023	Denmark U17	14	(0)
2023–2024	Denmark U18	8	(0)
2024–	Denmark U19	12	(1)
- * Club domestic league appearances and goals as of 2 June 2026

Nikolaj Juul-Sandberg (born 21 April 2006) is a Danish footballer who plays as a midfielder for Danish Superliga club OB.

== Club career ==
=== OB ===
Juul-Sandberg, who grew up in Middelfart, started his career at Middelfart Boldklub before moving to Odense Boldklub in 2019 as a U14 player. From there, he worked his way up through the club's academy.

Already as a second-year U19 player, 18-year old Juul-Sandberg was promoted to the first-team squad in the summer of 2024. On 6 August 2024, Juul-Sandberg made his official debut for OB in a Danish Cup game against his former club, Middelfart Boldklub.

On 18 October 2024, Juul-Sandberg made his league debut when he entered the pitch with nine minutes remaining in a Danish 1st Division match against FC Roskilde, scoring his debut goal just a few minutes later. He finished the 2024–25 season with a total of eight appearances for OB's first team.

Following OB's promotion to the 2025–26 Danish Superliga, and consequently reduced prospects of regular playing time, OB confirmed on 1 September 2025 that Juul-Sandberg had extended his contract until June 2028, and was simultaneously loaned to his former club, Middelfart Boldklub, which had just been promoted to the 2025–26 Danish 1st Division, for the remainder of the season.

== Honours ==
OB

- Danish 1st Division: 2024–25
