= Soumaila Bakayoko =

Soumaila Bakayoko may refer to:

- Soumaila Bakayoko (footballer)
- Soumaila Bakayoko (soldier)
