= Juho Lähteenmäki =

Finnish footballer (born 2006)

Personal information
- Full name: Juho Väinö Valtteri Lähteenmäki
- Date of birth: 15 June 2006 (age 20)
- Place of birth: Ylöjärvi, Finland
- Height: 1.81 m (5 ft 11 in)
- Position: Left back

Team information
- Current team: Nordsjælland
- Number: 5

Youth career
- Ylöjärven Ilves
- –2022: Ilves
- 2022–2025: Nordsjælland

Senior career*
Years	Team	Apps	(Gls)
2025–	Nordsjælland	53	(2)

International career^{‡}
2021–2022	Finland U16	7	(3)
2022–2023	Finland U17	13	(1)
2023–2024	Finland U18	4	(0)
2023–2025	Finland U19	11	(1)
2025–	Finland U21	2	(1)
2025–	Finland	11	(0)
- * Club domestic league appearances and goals as of 18 October 2026 ‡ National team caps and goals as of 15 November 2026

Juho Väinö Valtteri Lähteenmäki (born 15 June 2006) is a Finnish football player who plays as a left back for Danish Superliga club Nordsjælland and the Finland national team.

== Youth career ==
Lähteenmäki started to play football in Ylöjärven Ilves in Ylöjärvi, before moving to Tampere and joining the Ilves youth academy. During his youth years, Lähteenmäki played as a winger.

In January 2022, Lähteenmäki signed a deal with Danish club Nordsjælland, starting in July.

== Club career ==
On 11 December 2024, Lähteenmäki signed a new professional contract with Nordsjælland, valid until June 2028.

On 23 February 2025, Lähteenmäki made his professional debut with the Nordsjælland first team in Danish Superliga, as a starting left back in a 3–2 home win against Sønderjyske. He scored his first goal in the league on 10 August 2025 against Silkeborg.

== International career ==
Lähteenmäki is a regular Finnish youth international, having represented Finland at under-16, under-17, under-18 and under-19 youth national team levels.

In 2023, Lähteenmäki was part of the Finland U19 squad in the 2024 UEFA European Under-19 Championship qualification tournament, in three games against Romania, Czech Republic and San Marino.

He debuted with the Finland under-21 national team in September 2025 and scored in his debut against San Marino.

Lähteenmäki made his debut with the Finland senior national team on 9 October 2025, as a starter in a 2026 FIFA World Cup qualifying win against Lithuania at the Helsinki Olympic Stadium.

== Career statistics ==
=== Club ===
As of 18 October 2026

Appearances and goals by club, season and competition
Club	Season	League			National cup (Note: Includes Danish Cup)		Europe		Other		Total	
Club	Season	Division	Apps	Goals	Apps	Goals	Apps	Goals	Apps	Goals	Apps	Goals
Nordsjælland	2024–25	Danish Superliga	15	0	0	0	–		–		15	0
Nordsjælland	2025–26	Danish Superliga	27	2	2	0	–		–		29	2
Nordsjælland	2026–27	Danish Superliga	11	0	0	0	7 (Note: Appearances in UEFA Conference League)	1	–		18	1
Nordsjælland	Total		53	2	2	0	7	1	0	0	62	3
Career total			53	2	2	0	7	1	0	0	62	3

=== International ===
As of match played 15 November 2026

National team	Year	Competitive		Friendly		Total	
National team	Year	Apps	Goals	Apps	Goals	Apps	Goals
Finland	2025	3 (Note: Appearances in the 2026 FIFA World Cup qualification.)	0	1	0	4	0
Finland	2026	5 (Note: Appearances in the 2026–27 UEFA Nations League C.)	0	2 (Note: Includes two appearances in the 2026 FIFA Series.)	0	7	0
Total		8	0	3	0	11	0

== Honours ==
Finland

- FIFA Series: 2026
