= Óscar Marcos =

Spanish footballer (born 2006)

Personal information
- Full name: Óscar Marcos Santamaría
- Date of birth: 19 February 2006 (age 20)
- Place of birth: Vilagarcía de Arousa, Spain
- Height: 1.81 m (5 ft 11 in)
- Positions: Midfielder; winger

Team information
- Current team: Celta B
- Number: 10

Youth career
- Caldas
- 2014–2024: Celta

Senior career*
Years	Team	Apps	(Gls)
2024–	Celta B	62	(12)
2025–	Celta	0	(0)

International career^{‡}
2021	Spain U16	2	(0)
2023	Spain U17	1	(1)
2024	Spain U18	3	(0)
2024–2025	Spain U19	14	(4)
- * Club domestic league appearances and goals as of 15 August 2026 ‡ National team caps and goals as of 26 June 2025

Óscar Marcos Santamaría (born 19 February 2006) is a Spanish professional footballer who plays as a midfielder or winger for RC Celta Fortuna.

== Club career ==
Born in Vilagarcía de Arousa, Pontevedra, Galicia, Marcos joined the youth academy of La Liga side Celta at the age of eight. Ahead of the 2024–25 season, he was promoted to the club's reserve team.

Marcos made his first team debut on 30 October 2025, coming on as a half-time substitute for fellow youth graduate Yoel Lago and scoring the opener in a 2–0 away win over Puerto de Vega CF, for the campaign's Copa del Rey.

== International career ==
Marcos is a Spain youth international. During the summer of 2025, he played for the Spain national under-19 football team at the 2019 UEFA European Under-19 Championship.

== Style of play ==
Marcos plays as a midfielder or winger. Spanish news website El Desmarque wrote in 2025 that "in addition to playing as a striker... [he] can also play as a false nine, thus expanding his options on the pitch".
