= Gonzalo Pastor =

Spanish footballer (born 2006)

Personal information
- Full name: Gonzalo Pastor Sánchez
- Date of birth: 20 March 2006 (age 20)
- Place of birth: Dénia, Spain
- Height: 1.83 m (6 ft 0 in)
- Position: Midfielder

Team information
- Current team: Unionistas (on loan from Famalicão)
- Number: 24

Youth career
- FB Dénia
- 2016–2023: Valencia
- 2023–2024: Castellón

Senior career*
Years	Team	Apps	(Gls)
2024	Castellón B	6	(1)
2024–2025	Castellón	15	(0)
2025–	Famalicão	2	(0)
2026–	→ Unionistas (loan)	0	(0)

International career^{‡}
2025	Spain U19	8	(1)
Medal record
Men's football
Representing Spain
UEFA European Under-19 Championship
Runner-up	2025 Romania
- * Club domestic league appearances and goals as of 5 September 2026 ‡ National team caps and goals as of 26 June 2025

Gonzalo Pastor Sánchez (born 20 March 2006) is a Spanish professional footballer who plays as a midfielder for Primera Federación club Unionistas on loan from Primeira Liga club Famalicão.

== Club career ==
Born in Dénia, Alicante, Valencian Community, Pastor joined Valencia CF's youth setup in 2016, from FB Dénia. He left the former in 2023, and moved to CD Castellón, being initially assigned to the Juvenil squad.

Pastor made his senior debut with the reserves on 1 May 2024, coming on as a late substitute in a 0–0 Tercera Federación home draw against CD Utiel. On 1 December, he made his first team debut by replacing Douglas Aurélio in a 2–0 Segunda División home win over Málaga CF.

On 1 September 2025, Pastor moved abroad for the first time in his career, signing a four-year contract with Primeira Liga side Famalicão. He mostly played for their Under-23 squad in the 2025–26 season, making just two late substitute appearances for the senior squad for the year.

On 1 September 2026, he was loaned by Unionistas in Primera Federación.

== International career ==
On 9 January 2025, Pastor was called up to the Spain national under-19 team for a friendly against Italy. He made his debut for the side six days later, providing the assist to Arturo Rodríguez's winner in the 1–0 win at the La Ciudad del Fútbol.

== Honours ==
=== Spain U19 ===
- UEFA European Under-19 Championship runner-up: 2025
