= Matthew Orr (footballer) =

Northern Irish association football player (born 2007)

Personal information
- Date of birth: 16 April 2007 (age 19)
- Place of birth: Bangor, Northern Ireland
- Height: 1.88 m (6 ft 2 in)
- Position: Right-back

Team information
- Current team: Nottingham Forest

Youth career
- –2024: Linfield

Senior career*
Years	Team	Apps	(Gls)
2024–2025	Linfield	37	(2)
2025–	Nottingham Forest	0	(0)

International career
2024-	Northern Ireland U19	3	(1)
- * Club domestic league appearances and goals as of 00:15 (UTC) 16 May 2025

Matthew Orr (born 16 April 2007) is a Northern Irish footballer who plays as a right-back for Premier League club Nottingham Forest. He is a Northern Ireland youth international.

== Club career ==
A defender, he featured at right back and centre back for Linfield in the NIFL Premiership in his debut season in 2024. He scored on his competitive senior debut for Linfield in a UEFA Conference League game, scoring against Stjarnan in July 2024. The following month he signed his first professional contract with the club.

It was reported that Linfield turned down a transfer bid from Stockport County for Orr in January 2025. He was named in the Northern Ireland Football Writers' Association Team of the Year in April 2025. The following month he was named as the league's Young Player of the Year.

He made his debut in the UEFA Champions League preliminary round against Shelbourne in July 2025.

On 1 September 2025, Orr signed for Premier League club Nottingham Forest on a three-year contract for an undisclosed fee.

== International career ==
He is a Northern Ireland youth international. He scored for Northern Ireland U19 against Israel U19 on 16 November 2024. He scored for Northern Ireland U21 against Georgia U21 on 9 September 2025
