= Onni Helén =

Finnish footballer (born 2006)

Personal information
- Date of birth: 10 January 2006 (age 20)
- Place of birth: Finland
- Position: Forward

Team information
- Current team: Sogndal
- Number: 15

Youth career
- –2016: TuNL
- 2017–2022: TPS

Senior career*
Years	Team	Apps	(Gls)
2022–2023	TPS II	17	(12)
2023–2025	TPS	48	(17)
2024	→ Jazz (loan)	8	(3)
2026–	Sogndal	29	(2)

International career^{‡}
2021	Finland U16	2	(1)
2022	Finland U17	2	(0)
2024	Finland U18	5	(0)
2024–2025	Finland U19	7	(3)
2025–	Finland U21	4	(2)
- * Club domestic league appearances and goals as of 14 November 2026 ‡ National team caps and goals as of 31 March 2026

Onni Helén (born 10 January 2006) is a Finnish professional footballer who plays as a centre forward for 1. divisjon club Sogndal.

== Club career ==
Helén started football in Turun Nappulaliiga youth league and joined Turun Palloseura in 2017. He played in the club's youth teams and made his senior debut with TPS reserve team in 2022 in the fourth-tier Kolmonen. In October 2022, he spent time with Italian club Empoli on trial. Next season he debuted with the first team and played 11 matches in the second-tier Ykkönen.

In August 2024, Helén was loaned out to Jazz.

== International career ==
Helén has represented Finland at under-16, under-17 and under-18 youth international levels. Since 2024, he has been part of the Finland U19 national team. He debuted with the Finland national under-21 football team in 2025.

== Career statistics ==
As of 14 November 2026

Appearances and goals by club, season and competition
Club	Season	League			National cup (Note: Includes Finnish Cup and Norwegian Cup)		League cup (Note: Includes Ykkönen Cup and Ykkösliigacup)		Total	
Club	Season	Division	Apps	Goals	Apps	Goals	Apps	Goals	Apps	Goals
TPS U23	2022	Kolmonen	9	5	–		–		9	5
TPS U23	2023	Kolmonen	8	7	–		–		8	7
TPS U23	Total		17	12	0	0	0	0	17	12
TPS	2023	Ykkönen	11	0	0	0	0	0	11	0
TPS	2024	Ykkösliiga	9	0	4	3	4	1	17	4
TPS	2025	Ykkösliiga	28	17	2	0	6	5	36	22
TPS	Total		48	17	6	3	10	6	64	26
Jazz (loan)	2024	Ykkönen	8	3	–		–		8	3
Sogndal	2026	1. divisjon	29	2	3	4	–		32	6
Career total			102	34	9	7	10	6	121	47
