= KFF Gramshi =

Albanian football club

- Full name: Klubi i Futbollit për Femra Gramshi
- Founded: 18 September 2023; 23 months ago
- Ground: Myslim Koçi Stadium
- Capacity: 1,500
- League: Kategoria Superiore Femra
- 2024–25: 2nd
Home colours	Away colours	Third colours

KFF Gramshi (Albanian: Klubi Futbollistik për Femra Gramshi), commonly known as Gramshi, is a women's football club based in Gramsh, Albania. The club play in the Abissnet Superiore Femra, which is the top tier of football in the country.
