= Julius Paananen =

Finnish footballer (born 2006)

Personal information
- Full name: Julius Leo Joonatan Paananen
- Date of birth: 26 November 2006 (age 19)
- Place of birth: Helsinki, Finland
- Height: 1.85 m (6 ft 1 in)
- Position: Midfielder

Team information
- Current team: AC Oulu
- Number: 6

Youth career
- OrPa
- 2016–2017: OTP
- 2017–2023: OLS

Senior career*
Years	Team	Apps	(Gls)
2023–	OLS	33	(3)
2023–	AC Oulu	50	(3)

International career^{‡}
2023–	Finland U17	5	(2)
2023–	Finland U18	6	(0)
2024–	Finland U19	2	(2)
- * Club domestic league appearances and goals as of 12 November 2026 ‡ National team caps and goals as of 12 October 2024

Julius Leo Joonatan Paananen (born 26 November 2006) is a Finnish professional football midfielder for Veikkausliiga side AC Oulu.

== Club career ==
Paananen signed his first professional contract with AC Oulu on 18 June 2023, on a deal until the end of 2024 with an option to extend. He made his debut in Veikkausliiga on 6 October 2023, in away game against Ilves. His contract was extended in April 2025 on a two-year deal with a one-year option, and later Paananen scored his first Veikkausliiga goal on 26 April, in a home loss against Inter Turku.

== International career ==
Paananen has represented Finland at under-17, under-18 and under-19 youth international levels. He was chosen to the mens under-21 team Finland in the spring and summer of 2026.

== Personal life ==
His older brother Kasper Paananen is also a professional football player for SJK.

== Career statistics ==
As of 26 April 2025

Appearances and goals by club, season and competition
Club	Season	League			National cup (Note: Includes Suomen Cup)		League cup (Note: Includes Finnish League Cup)		Continental		Total	
Club	Season	Division	Apps	Goals	Apps	Goals	Apps	Goals	Apps	Goals	Apps	Goals
OLS	2023	Kakkonen	7	2	1	0	—		—		8	2
OLS	2024	Ykkönen	23	1	0	0	—		—		23	1
OLS	Total		30	3	1	0	0	0	0	0	31	3
AC Oulu	2023	Veikkausliiga	2	0	0	0	0	0	—		2	0
AC Oulu	2024	Veikkausliiga	1	0	0	0	3	0	—		4	0
AC Oulu	2025	Veikkausliiga	4	1	1	2	1	0	–		6	3
AC Oulu	Total		7	1	1	2	4	0	0	0	12	3
Career total			37	4	2	2	4	0	0	0	45	6

== Honours ==
- Finnish FA, Northern Finland: Boy Player of the Year 2023
