= Fabio Domingos =

Footballer (born 2007)

Personal information
- Full name: Fabio Monteiro Domingos
- Date of birth: 5 October 2007 (age 19)
- Place of birth: Luxembourg City, Luxembourg
- Height: 1.77 m (5 ft 10 in)
- Position: Winger

Team information
- Current team: Paris Saint-Germain

Youth career
- Progrès Niederkorn
- 2021–2025: Metz
- 2025–: Paris Saint-Germain

International career^{‡}
Years	Team	Apps	(Gls)
2023	Luxembourg U15	2	(0)
2023	Luxembourg U20	6	(0)
2024–2025	Luxembourg U19	7	(3)
2025	Luxembourg U21	3	(0)
2026–	Cape Verde	1	(0)
- ‡ National team caps and goals as of 13:25, 27 October 2025 (UTC)

Fabio Monteiro Domingos (Portuguese: [ˈfa.bi.u mõ.ˈtej.ɾu du.ˈmĩ.ɡuʃ]; born 5 October 2007) is a professional footballer who plays as a winger for Paris Saint-Germain. Born in Luxembourg, he plays for the Cape Verde national team.

== Club career ==
A youth product of the Luxembourgish club Progrès Niederkorn and the French club Metz, Domingos moved to the Paris Saint-Germain Youth Academy in on 30 June 2025 on a contract until 2027.

== International career ==
Born in Luxembourg, Domingos is of Cape Verdean descent and holds dual Luxembourgish and Cape Verdean descent. In March 2026, he was simultaneously called up to the Luxembourg national team and Cape Verde national team, opting to play for the latter. He debuted with Cape Verde in a FIFA Series 1–1 (4–2) penalty shootout win over Finland on 30 March 2026.

== Honours ==
Paris Saint-Germain U19

- Championnat National U19: 2025–26
