= Karem Zoabi =

Israeli footballer

Personal information
- Date of birth: 3 May 2006 (age 20)
- Place of birth: Tamra, Jezreel Valley, Israel
- Height: 1.84 m (6 ft 1/2 in)
- Position: Forward

Team information
- Current team: Torreense
- Number: 19

Youth career
- 2013–2014: F.C. Bu'eine-Nujeidat
- 2014–2016: Hapoel Asi Gilboa
- 2016–2019: Maccabi Haifa
- 2019–2023: Hapoel Jerusalem

Senior career*
Years	Team	Apps	(Gls)
2023–2024	Hapoel Jerusalem	25	(3)
2024–2026	Rio Ave	17	(0)
2026–	Torreense	2	(0)

International career^{‡}
2021	Israel U17	17	(4)
2022	Israel U18	2	(0)
2023–2025	Israel U19	15	(3)
2024–	Israel U21	6	(0)
- * Club domestic league appearances and goals as of 11 September 2026 ‡ National team caps and goals as of 26 March 2026

Karem Zoabi (Arabic: كرم زعبي, Hebrew: כרם זועבי; born 3 May 2006) is an Israeli professional footballer who plays as a forward for Liga Portugal 2 club Torreense and the Israel national under-21 team.

== Club career ==
Zoabi made his senior debut for Hapoel Jerusalem on 4 April 2023, as a substitute in the 65th minute in an Israeli Premier League away match against Maccabi Netanya, that ended in a 2–0 win.

On 1 July 2024, Zoabi signed for Primeira Liga club Rio Ave.

On 30 June 2026, Zoabi moved to Torreense in Liga Portugal 2.

== International career ==
He is a youth International for Israel, who plays for the under-19 national team since 2023.

== Career statistics ==
=== Club ===
As of match played 1 June 2024

Club	Season	League			National cup (Note: Includes Israel State Cup)		League cup (Note: Includes Toto Cup)		Total	
Club	Season	Division	Apps	Goals	Apps	Goals	Apps	Goals	Apps	Goals
Hapoel Jerusalem	2022–23	Israeli Premier League	4	0	0	0	0	0	4	0
Hapoel Jerusalem	2023–24	Israeli Premier League	21	3	2	0	0	0	23	3
Hapoel Jerusalem	Total		25	3	2	0	0	0	27	3
Rio Ave	2024–25	Primeira Liga	0	0	0	0	0	0	0	0
Career total			25	3	2	0	0	0	27	3
