= Liran Hazan =

Israeli footballer (born 2006)

Liran Hazan לירן חזן
Personal information
- Full name: Liran Hazan
- Date of birth: 10 May 2006 (age 20)
- Place of birth: Petah Tikva, Israel
- Height: 1.82 m (5 ft 11 1/2 in)
- Position: Midfielder

Team information
- Current team: Maccabi Petah Tikva
- Number: 9

Youth career
- 2014–2017: Hapoel Petah Tikva
- 2017–2019: Ironi Modi'in
- 2019–: Maccabi Petah Tikva

Senior career*
Years	Team	Apps	(Gls)
2023–	Maccabi Petah Tikva	73	(11)

International career^{‡}
2022	Israel U16	2	(1)
2022–2023	Israel U17	11	(2)
2022	Israel U18	3	(0)
2023–	Israel U19	8	(3)
2024–	Israel U21	0	(0)
- * Club domestic league appearances and goals as of 24 June 2026 ‡ National team caps and goals as of 1 October 2024

Liran Hazan (Hebrew: לירן חזן; born 10 May 2006) is an Israeli professional footballer who plays as a midfielder for Israeli club Maccabi Petah Tikva and the Israel national under-19 team.

== Club career ==
Hazan made his senior debut for Maccabi Petah Tikva on 31 January 2024, as a substitute in the 76th minute in an Israeli Premier League away match against Hapoel Hadera, that ended in a 1–0 win.

== International career ==
He is a youth International for Israel, who plays for the under-19 national team since 2023.

== Career statistics ==
=== Club ===
As of 22 February 2024.

Club	Season	League			State Cup		Toto Cup		Continental		Other		Total	
Club	Season	Division	Apps	Goals	Apps	Goals	Apps	Goals	Apps	Goals	Apps	Goals	Apps	Goals
Maccabi Petah Tikva	2023–24	Israeli Premier League	4	0	1	0	0	0	–		0	0	5	0
Maccabi Petah Tikva	Total		4	0	1	0	0	0	0	0	0	0	5	0
Career total			4	0	1	0	0	0	0	0	0	0	5	0

== Honours ==
Maccabi Petah Tikva

- Israel State Cup: 2023–24

== See also ==
- List of Jewish footballers
- List of Jews in sports
- List of Israelis
