= 2020–21 UEFA Women's Champions League =

20th edition of the European women's club football championship organised by UEFA

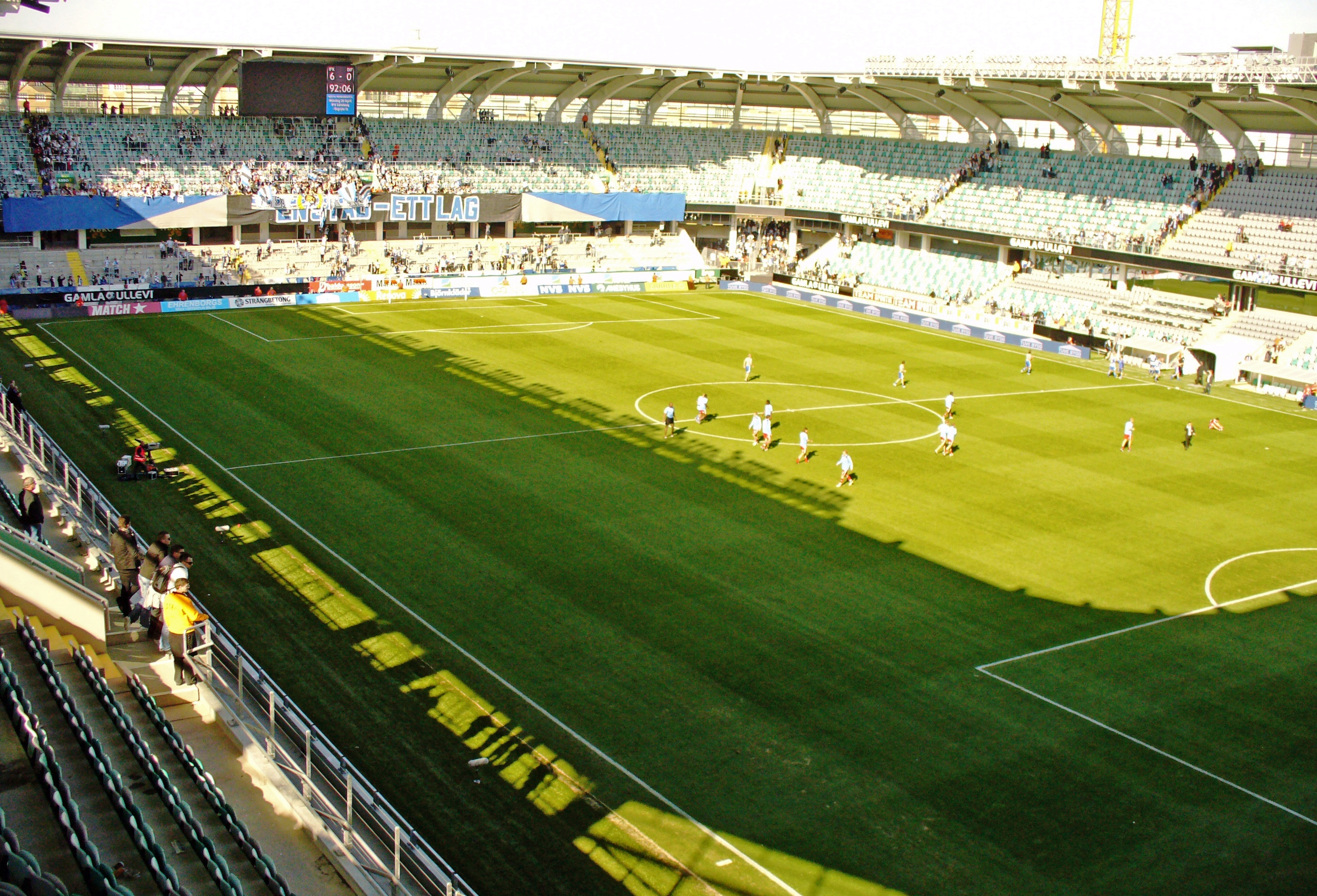
- The Gamla Ullevi in Gothenburg hosted the final

Tournament details
- Dates: Qualifying rounds: 3–19 November 2020; Knockout phase: 8 December 2020 – 16 May 2021
- Teams: Knockout phase: 32; Total: 62 (from 50 associations)

Final positions
- Champions: (Spain) Barcelona (1st title)
- Runners-up: (England) Chelsea

Tournament statistics
- Matches played: 89
- Goals scored: 318 (3.57 per match)
- Attendance: 2,576 (29 per match)
- Top scorer(s): (Spain) Jennifer Hermoso (England) Fran Kirby; 6 goals each
- Best players: Goalkeeper: (Spain) Sandra Paños (Barcelona); Defender: (Spain) Irene Paredes (Paris Saint-Germain); Midfielder: (Spain) Alexia Putellas (Barcelona); Forward: (Spain) Jennifer Hermoso (Barcelona)

The 2020–21 UEFA Women's Champions League was the 20th edition of the European women's club football championship organised by UEFA, and the 12th edition since being rebranded as the UEFA Women's Champions League.

The final was held at the Gamla Ullevi in Gothenburg, Sweden. The winners of the 2020–21 UEFA Women's Champions League automatically qualified for the 2021–22 UEFA Women's Champions League group stage, which will be the first edition to feature a 16-team group stage.

Lyon were the defending champions, having won the previous five editions, but were eliminated by Paris Saint-Germain in the quarter-finals. Barcelona won their first title by beating Chelsea in the final, becoming the first club to have won both men's and women's Champions League titles.

Due to the COVID-19 pandemic in Europe, each local health department allowed a different number of spectators.

== Association team allocation ==
The association ranking based on the UEFA women's country coefficients was used to determine the number of participating teams for each association:

- Associations 1–12 each had two teams qualify.
- All other associations, if they entered, each had one team qualify.
- The winners of the 2019–20 UEFA Women's Champions League were given an additional entry if they did not qualify for the 2020–21 UEFA Women's Champions League through their domestic league. However, the title holders had qualified through their domestic league, meaning the additional entry was not necessary for this season.

An association had to have an eleven-a-side women's domestic league to enter a team. In 2019–20, 52 of the 55 UEFA member associations organized a women's domestic league, with the exceptions being Andorra, Liechtenstein and San Marino.

=== Association ranking ===
For the 2020–21 UEFA Women's Champions League, the associations were allocated places according to their 2019 UEFA women's country coefficients, which took into account their performance in European competitions from 2014–15 to 2018–19. For the first time there were two entries for the Netherlands and Kazakhstan.

Association ranking for 2020–21 UEFA Women's Champions League

Rank	Association	Coeff.	Teams
1	France	90.500	2
2	Germany	77.500	2
3	England	53.500	2
4	Sweden	53.500	2
5	Spain	52.000	2
6	Czech Republic	39.000	2
7	Denmark	36.500	2
8	Italy	33.000	2
9	Switzerland	31.000	2
10	Netherlands	30.000	2
11	Norway	28.500	2
12	Kazakhstan	26.000	2
13	Russia	26.000	1
14	Scotland	24.500	1
15	Iceland	21.000	1
16	Lithuania	21.000	1
17	Cyprus	19.000	1
18	Austria	19.000	1
19	Poland	18.000	1

Rank	Association	Coeff.	Teams
20	Serbia	13.500	1
21	Belarus	12.500	1
22	Bosnia and Herzegovina	12.000	1
23	Romania	12.000	1
24	Portugal	11.000	1
25	Greece	10.500	1
26	Belgium	10.500	1
27	Hungary	10.500	1
28	Ukraine	10.000	1
29	Finland	9.500	1
30	Croatia	9.000	1
31	Republic of Ireland	8.500	1
32	Slovenia	8.000	1
33	Turkey	7.500	1
34	Albania	5.500	1
35	Bulgaria	5.000	1
36	Israel	5.000	1
37	Estonia	4.500	1

Rank	Association	Coeff.	Teams
38	Slovakia	3.000	1
39	Wales	2.500	1
40	Faroe Islands	2.500	1
41	Northern Ireland	2.000	1
42	Montenegro	1.500	1
43	Malta	1.000	1
44	Kosovo	1.000	1
45	Latvia	1.000	1
46	Moldova	0.500	1
47	North Macedonia	0.000	1
48	Georgia	0.000	1
49	Luxembourg	0.000	1
NR	Armenia	—	1
NR	Azerbaijan	—	DNE
NR	Gibraltar	—	DNE
NR	Andorra	—	NL
NR	Liechtenstein	—	NL
NR	San Marino	—	NL

Notes

- NR – No rank (association did not enter in any of the seasons used for computing coefficients)
- DNE – Did not enter
- NL – No women's domestic league

=== Distribution ===
Unlike the men's Champions League, not every association entered a team, and so the exact number of teams entering in the qualifying rounds (played as two rounds of single-legged ties for this season) and knockout phase (starting from the round of 32, played as home-and-away two-legged ties except for the one-match final) could not be determined until the full entry list was known. In general, the title holders, the champions of the top 12 associations, and the runners-up of highest-ranked associations (exact number depending on the number of entries) received a bye to the round of 32. All other teams (runners-up of lowest-ranked associations and champions of associations starting from 13th) entered the qualifying round, with the group winners and a maximum of two best runners-up advancing to the round of 32.

The following is the access list for this season.

Access list for 2020–21 UEFA Women's Champions League
	Teams entering in this round	Teams advancing from previous round
First qualifying round (40 teams)	38 champions from associations 13 or lower; 2 runners-up from associations 11–12	
Second qualifying round (20 teams)		20 winners of first qualifying round
Knockout phase (32 teams)	12 champions from associations 1–12 (including title holders Lyon); 10 runners-up from associations 1–10	10 winners of second qualifying round

=== Teams ===
In early April 2020, UEFA announced that due to the COVID-19 pandemic in Europe, the deadline for entering the tournament had been postponed until further notice. On 17 June 2020, UEFA announced that associations had to enter their teams by 10 August 2020. The 2020–21 season was the first where teams had to obtain a UEFA club licence to participate in the UEFA Women's Champions League.

A total of 62 teams from 50 of the 55 UEFA member associations participated in the 2020–21 UEFA Women's Champions League.

The labels in the parentheses show how each team qualified for the place of its starting round:

- TH: Title holders
- 1st, 2nd: League positions of the previous season
- Abd-: League positions of abandoned season due to the COVID-19 pandemic in Europe as determined by the national association; all teams were subject to approval by UEFA as per the guidelines for entry to European competitions in response to the COVID-19 pandemic

Qualified teams for 2020–21 UEFA Women's Champions League
Entry round	Teams			
R32	(France) Lyon (Abd-1st)^{TH}	(France) Paris Saint-Germain (Abd-2nd)	(Germany) VfL Wolfsburg (1st)	(Germany) Bayern Munich (2nd)
R32	(England) Chelsea (Abd-1st)	(England) Manchester City (Abd-2nd)	(Sweden) Rosengård (1st)	(Sweden) Kopparbergs/Göteborg (2nd)
R32	(Spain) Barcelona (Abd-1st)	(Spain) Atlético Madrid (Abd-2nd)	(Czech Republic) Slavia Prague (Abd-1st)	(Czech Republic) Sparta Prague (Abd-2nd)
R32	(Denmark) Fortuna Hjørring (1st)	(Denmark) Brøndby (2nd)	(Italy) Juventus (Abd-1st)	(Italy) Fiorentina (Abd-2nd)
R32	(Switzerland) Servette Chênois (Abd-1st)	(Switzerland) Zürich (Abd-2nd)	(Netherlands) PSV (Abd-1st)	(Netherlands) Ajax (Abd-2nd)
R32	(Norway) LSK Kvinner (1st)	(Kazakhstan) BIIK Kazygurt (1st)		
Q1	(Norway) Vålerenga (2nd)	(Kazakhstan) Okzhetpes (2nd)	(Russia) CSKA Moscow (1st)	(Scotland) Glasgow City (1st)
Q1	(Iceland) Valur (1st)	(Lithuania) Gintra Universitetas (1st)	(Cyprus) Apollon Limassol (Abd-1st)	(Austria) St. Pölten (Abd-1st)
Q1	(Poland) Górnik Łęczna (Abd-1st)	(Serbia) Spartak Subotica (Abd-1st)	(Belarus) FC Minsk (1st)	(Bosnia and Herzegovina) SFK 2000 (Abd-1st)
Q1	(Romania) Olimpia Cluj (Abd-1st)	(Portugal) Benfica (Abd-1st)	(Greece) PAOK (Abd-1st)	(Belgium) Anderlecht (Abd-1st)
Q1	(Hungary) Ferencváros (Abd-1st)	(Ukraine) Zhytlobud-2 Kharkiv (1st)	(Finland) HJK (1st)	(Croatia) Split (1st)
Q1	(Republic of Ireland) Peamount United (1st)	(Slovenia) Pomurje (Abd-1st)	(Turkey) ALG Spor (Abd-1st)	(Albania) Vllaznia (1st)
Q1	(Bulgaria) NSA Sofia (1st)	(Israel) Ramat HaSharon (Abd-1st)	(Estonia) Flora (1st)	(Slovakia) Slovan Bratislava (Abd-1st)
Q1	(Wales) Swansea City (Abd-1st)	(Faroe Islands) KÍ (1st)	(Northern Ireland) Linfield (1st)	(Montenegro) Breznica Pljevlja (Abd-1st)
Q1	(Malta) Birkirkara (Abd-1st)	(Kosovo) Mitrovica (Abd-1st)	(Latvia) Rīgas FS (2nd)	(Moldova) Agarista Anenii Noi (Abd-1st)
Q1	(North Macedonia) Kamenica Sasa (Abd-1st)	(Georgia (country)) Lanchkhuti (1st)	(Luxembourg) Racing FC (Abd-1st)	(Armenia) Alashkert (Abd-1st)

Notes

1. Armenia (ARM): The 2019–20 Armenian Women's Football Championship was abandoned due to the COVID-19 pandemic in Armenia. The winner of a play-off between the top two teams of the league at the time of the abandonment, Alashkert (who were declared champions), were selected to play in the 2020–21 UEFA Women's Champions League by the Football Federation of Armenia.
2. Austria (AUT): The 2019–20 ÖFB-Frauenliga was abandoned due to the COVID-19 pandemic in Austria. The top team of the league at the time of the abandonment, St. Pölten, were selected to play in the 2020–21 UEFA Women's Champions League by the Austrian Football Association.
3. Belgium (BEL): The 2019–20 Super League Vrouwenvoetbal was abandoned due to the COVID-19 pandemic in Belgium. The top team of the league at the time of the abandonment, Anderlecht (who were declared champions), were selected to play in the 2020–21 UEFA Women's Champions League by the Royal Belgian Football Association.
4. Bosnia and Herzegovina (BIH): The 2019–20 Bosnia and Herzegovina Women's Premier League was abandoned due to the COVID-19 pandemic in Bosnia and Herzegovina. The top team of the league at the time of the abandonment, SFK 2000 (who were declared champions), were selected to play in the 2020–21 UEFA Women's Champions League by the Football Association of Bosnia and Herzegovina.
5. Cyprus (CYP): The 2019–20 Cypriot Women's First Division was abandoned due to the COVID-19 pandemic in Cyprus. The top team of the league at the time of the abandonment, Apollon Limassol, were selected to play in the 2020–21 UEFA Women's Champions League by the Cyprus Football Association.
6. Czech Republic (CZE): The 2019–20 Czech Women's First Division was abandoned due to the COVID-19 pandemic in the Czech Republic. The top two teams of the league at the time of the abandonment, Slavia Prague (who were declared champions) and Sparta Prague, were selected to play in the 2020–21 UEFA Women's Champions League by the Football Association of the Czech Republic.
7. England (ENG): The 2019–20 FA WSL was abandoned due to the COVID-19 pandemic in England. The top two teams of the league at the time of the abandonment based on the average number of points per matches played for each team, Chelsea (who were declared champions) and Manchester City, were selected to play in the 2020–21 UEFA Women's Champions League by the Football Association.
8. France (FRA): The 2019–20 Division 1 Féminine was abandoned due to the COVID-19 pandemic in France. The top two teams of the league at the time of the abandonment, Lyon (who were declared champions) and Paris Saint-Germain, were selected to play in the 2020–21 UEFA Women's Champions League by the French Football Federation.
9. Greece (GRE): The 2019–20 Panelinio Protathlima was abandoned due to the COVID-19 pandemic in Greece. The top team of the league at the time of the abandonment, PAOK (who were declared champions), were selected to play in the 2020–21 UEFA Women's Champions League by the Hellenic Football Federation.
10. Hungary (HUN): The 2019–20 Női NB I was abandoned due to the COVID-19 pandemic in Hungary. The winner of a play-off between the top two teams of the league after 13 rounds (including one originally scheduled match played after the time of the abandonment), Ferencváros, were selected to play in the 2020–21 UEFA Women's Champions League by the Hungarian Football Federation.
11. Israel (ISR): The 2019–20 Ligat Nashim was abandoned due to the COVID-19 pandemic in Israel. The top team of the league at the time of the abandonment, Ramat HaSharon (who were declared champions), were selected to play in the 2020–21 UEFA Women's Champions League by the Israel Football Association.
12. Italy (ITA): The 2019–20 Women's Serie A was abandoned due to the COVID-19 pandemic in Italy. The top two teams of the league at the time of the abandonment, Juventus (who were declared champions) and Fiorentina, were selected to play in the 2020–21 UEFA Women's Champions League by the Italian Football Federation.
13. Kosovo (KOS): The 2019–20 Kosovo Women's League was abandoned due to the COVID-19 pandemic in Kosovo. The winner of a play-off between the top two teams of the league at the time of the abandonment, Mitrovica (who were declared champions), were selected to play in the 2020–21 UEFA Women's Champions League by the Football Federation of Kosovo.
14. Latvia (LVA): Dinamo Rīga, the champions of the 2019 Latvian Women's League, decided not to play the 2020 Latvian Women's League and the 2020–21 UEFA Women's Champions League. As a result, Rīgas FS, the second-placed team, qualified for the 2020–21 UEFA Women's Champions League.
15. Luxembourg (LUX): The 2019–20 Dames Ligue 1 was abandoned due to the COVID-19 pandemic in Luxembourg. The top team of the league at the time of the abandonment, Racing FC, were selected to play in the 2020–21 UEFA Women's Champions League by the Luxembourg Football Federation.
16. Malta (MLT): The 2019–20 Maltese Women's First Division was abandoned due to the COVID-19 pandemic in Malta. The top team of the league at the time of the abandonment, Birkirkara (who were declared champions), were selected to play in the 2020–21 UEFA Women's Champions League by the Malta Football Association.
17. Moldova (MDA): The 2019–20 Moldovan Women Top League was abandoned due to the COVID-19 pandemic in Moldova. The top team of the league at the time of the abandonment, Agarista Anenii Noi (who were declared champions), were selected to play in the 2020–21 UEFA Women's Champions League by the Moldovan Football Federation.
18. Montenegro (MNE): The 2019–20 Montenegrin Women's League was abandoned due to the COVID-19 pandemic in Montenegro. The top team of the league at the time of the abandonment, Breznica Pljevlja (who were already assured of the title by then and were declared champions), were selected to play in the 2020–21 UEFA Women's Champions League by the Football Association of Montenegro.
19. Netherlands (NED): The 2019–20 Eredivisie Vrouwen was abandoned due to the COVID-19 pandemic in the Netherlands. The top two teams of the league at the time of the abandonment, PSV and Ajax, were selected to play in the 2020–21 UEFA Women's Champions League by the Royal Dutch Football Association.
20. North Macedonia (MKD): The 2019–20 Prva ŽFL was abandoned due to the COVID-19 pandemic in North Macedonia. The top team of the league at the time of the abandonment, Kamenica Sasa (who were declared champions), were selected to play in the 2020–21 UEFA Women's Champions League by the Football Federation of North Macedonia.
21. Poland (POL): The 2019–20 Women's Ekstraliga was abandoned due to the COVID-19 pandemic in Poland. The top team of the league at the time of the abandonment, Górnik Łęczna (who were declared champions), were selected to play in the 2020–21 UEFA Women's Champions League by the Polish Football Association.
22. Portugal (POR): The 2019–20 Campeonato Nacional Feminino was abandoned due to the COVID-19 pandemic in Portugal. The top team of the league at the time of the abandonment, Benfica, were selected to play in the 2020–21 UEFA Women's Champions League by the Portuguese Football Federation.
23. Romania (ROU): The 2019–20 Liga I Feminin was abandoned due to the COVID-19 pandemic in Romania. The top team of the league at the time of the abandonment, Olimpia Cluj, were selected to play in the 2020–21 UEFA Women's Champions League by the Romanian Football Federation.
24. Serbia (SRB): The 2019–20 Serbian SuperLiga Žene was abandoned due to the COVID-19 pandemic in Serbia. The top team of the league at the time of the abandonment, Spartak Subotica (who were declared champions), were selected to play in the 2020–21 UEFA Women's Champions League by the Football Association of Serbia.
25. Slovakia (SVK): The 2019–20 Slovak Women's First League was abandoned due to the COVID-19 pandemic in Slovakia. The top team of the league at the time of the abandonment, Slovan Bratislava, were selected to play in the 2020–21 UEFA Women's Champions League by the Slovak Football Association.
26. Slovenia (SVN): The 2019–20 1. SŽNL was abandoned due to the COVID-19 pandemic in Slovenia. The top team of the league at the time of the abandonment, Pomurje, were selected to play in the 2020–21 UEFA Women's Champions League by the Football Association of Slovenia.
27. Spain (ESP): The 2019–20 Primera División Femenina was abandoned due to the COVID-19 pandemic in Spain. The top two teams of the league at the time of the abandonment, Barcelona (who were declared champions) and Atlético Madrid, were selected to play in the 2020–21 UEFA Women's Champions League by the Royal Spanish Football Federation.
28. Switzerland (SUI): The 2019–20 Nationalliga A was abandoned due to the COVID-19 pandemic in Switzerland. The top two teams of the league at the time of the abandonment, Servette Chênois and Zürich, were selected to play in the 2020–21 UEFA Women's Champions League by the Swiss Football Association.
29. Turkey (TUR): The 2019–20 Turkish Women's First Football League was abandoned due to the COVID-19 pandemic in Turkey. The top team of the league at the time of the abandonment, ALG Spor, were selected to play in the 2020–21 UEFA Women's Champions League by the Turkish Football Federation.
30. Wales (WAL): The 2019–20 Welsh Premier Women's League was abandoned due to the COVID-19 pandemic in Wales. The top team of the league at the time of the abandonment based on the average number of points per matches played for each team, Swansea City (who were declared champions), were selected to play in the 2020–21 UEFA Women's Champions League by the Football Association of Wales.

== Schedule ==
The schedule of the competition was as follows (all draws were held at the UEFA headquarters in Nyon, Switzerland). The tournament would have originally started in August 2020, but was initially delayed to October due to the COVID-19 pandemic in Europe. However, due to the continuing pandemic in Europe, UEFA announced a new format and schedule on 16 September 2020. Instead of mini-tournaments, the qualifying rounds were played as two rounds of single leg knockout matches.

Schedule for 2020–21 UEFA Women's Champions League
Phase	Round	Draw date	First leg	Second leg
Qualifying	First qualifying round	22 October 2020	3–4 November 2020	
Qualifying	Second qualifying round	6 November 2020	18–19 November 2020	
Knockout phase	Round of 32	24 November 2020	8–9 December 2020	15–16 December 2020
Knockout phase	Round of 16	16 February 2021	3–4 March 2021	10–11 March 2021
Knockout phase	Quarter-finals	12 March 2021	23–24 March 2021	31 March – 1 April 2021
Knockout phase	Semi-finals	12 March 2021	24–25 April 2021	1–2 May 2021
Knockout phase	Final	12 March 2021	16 May 2021 at Gamla Ullevi, Gothenburg	

The original schedule of the competition, as planned before the pandemic, and the schedule announced in June 2020, under the original format, was as follows.

Original schedule for 2020–21 UEFA Women's Champions League
Phase	Round	Draw date	First leg	Second leg
Qualifying	Qualifying round	19 June 2020	12, 15 & 18 August 2020	
Knockout phase	Round of 32	21 August 2020	7–8 October 2020	14–15 October 2020
Knockout phase	Round of 16	19 October 2020	11–12 November 2020	18–19 November 2020
Knockout phase	Quarter-finals	27 November 2020	23–24 March 2021	31 March – 1 April 2021
Knockout phase	Semi-finals	27 November 2020	24–25 April 2021	1–2 May 2021
Knockout phase	Final	27 November 2020	16 May 2021 at Gamla Ullevi, Gothenburg	

Schedule for 2020–21 UEFA Women's Champions League (original format)
Phase	Round	Draw date	First leg	Second leg
Qualifying	Qualifying round	September 2020	7, 10 & 13 October 2020	
Knockout phase	Round of 32	October 2020	11–12 November 2020	18–19 November 2020
Knockout phase	Round of 16	November 2020	3–4 March 2021	10–11 March 2021
Knockout phase	Quarter-finals	March 2021	23–24 March 2021	31 March – 1 April 2021
Knockout phase	Semi-finals	March 2021	24–25 April 2021	1–2 May 2021
Knockout phase	Final	March 2021	16 May 2021 at Gamla Ullevi, Gothenburg	

== Effects of the COVID-19 pandemic ==
Due to the COVID-19 pandemic in Europe, the following special rules were applicable to the competition:

- If there were travel restrictions related to the COVID-19 pandemic that prevented the away team from entering the home team's country or returning to their own country, the match could be played at a neutral country or the away team's country that allowed the match to take place.
- If a team refused to play or was considered responsible for a match not taking place, they were considered to have forfeited the match. If both teams refused to play or were considered responsible for a match not taking place, both teams were disqualified.
- If a team had players and/or officials tested positive for SARS-2 coronavirus preventing them from playing the match before the deadline set by UEFA, they were considered to have forfeited the match.

On 24 September 2020, UEFA announced that five substitutions would be permitted, with a sixth allowed in extra time. However, each team was only given three opportunities to make substitutions during matches, with a fourth opportunity in extra time, excluding substitutions made at half-time, before the start of extra time and at half-time in extra time. Consequently, a maximum of twelve players could be listed on the substitute bench.

== Qualifying rounds ==
=== First qualifying round ===
The draw for the first qualifying round was held on 22 October 2020, 12:00 CEST. The matches were played on 3 and 4 November 2020.

Team 1	Score	Team 2
CSKA Moscow (Russia)	2–0	(Estonia) Flora
FC Minsk (Belarus)	3–0	(Latvia) Rīgas FS
Spartak Subotica (Serbia)	4–0	(Moldova) Agarista Anenii Noi
Pomurje (Slovenia)	3–0	(Montenegro) Breznica Pljevlja
Zhytlobud-2 Kharkiv (Ukraine)	9–0	(Armenia) Alashkert
Okzhetpes (Kazakhstan)	1–2 (a.e.t.)	(Georgia (country)) Lanchkhuti
Valur (Iceland)	3–0	(Finland) HJK
Vålerenga (Norway)	7–0	(Faroe Islands) KÍ
Górnik Łęczna (Poland)	4–1	(Croatia) Split
Apollon Limassol (Cyprus)	3–0	(Wales) Swansea City
Gintra Universitetas (Lithuania)	4–0	(Slovakia) Slovan Bratislava
Ferencváros (Hungary)	6–1	(Luxembourg) Racing FC
St. Pölten (Austria)	2–0	(Kosovo) Mitrovica
NSA Sofia (Bulgaria)	3–1	(North Macedonia) Kamenica Sasa
Anderlecht (Belgium)	8–0	(Northern Ireland) Linfield
Glasgow City (Scotland)	0–0 (a.e.t.) (6–5 p)	(Republic of Ireland) Peamount United
PAOK (Greece)	1–3	(Portugal) Benfica
Olimpia Cluj (Romania)	2–1	(Malta) Birkirkara
Vllaznia (Albania)	3–3 (a.e.t.) (3–2 p)	(Turkey) ALG Spor
SFK 2000 (Bosnia and Herzegovina)	4–0	(Israel) Ramat HaSharon

=== Second qualifying round ===
The draw for the second qualifying round was held on 6 November 2020, 12:00 CET. The matches were played on 18 and 19 November 2020.

Team 1	Score	Team 2
Górnik Łęczna (Poland)	2–1	(Cyprus) Apollon Limassol
Gintra Universitetas (Lithuania)	0–7	(Norway) Vålerenga
Pomurje (Slovenia)	4–1	(Hungary) Ferencváros
Anderlecht (Belgium)	1–2	(Portugal) Benfica
NSA Sofia (Bulgaria)	0–7	(Serbia) Spartak Subotica
SFK 2000 (Bosnia and Herzegovina)	0–2	(Ukraine) Zhytlobud-2 Kharkiv
Valur (Iceland)	1–1 (a.e.t.) (3–4 p)	(Scotland) Glasgow City
St. Pölten (Austria)	1–0	(Russia) CSKA Moscow
Vllaznia (Albania)	0–2	(Belarus) FC Minsk
Olimpia Cluj (Romania)	0–1	(Georgia (country)) Lanchkhuti

== Knockout phase ==
=== Bracket ===
Round of 32
(Ukraine) Zhytlobud-2 Kharkiv	2	0	2
(Kazakhstan) BIIK Kazygurt (a)	1	1	2
(Netherlands) Ajax	1	0	1
(Germany) Bayern Munich	3	3	6
(Georgia (country)) Lanchkhuti	0	0	0
(Sweden) Rosengård	7	10	17
(Austria) St. Pölten	2	1	3
(Switzerland) Zürich	0	0	0
(Portugal) Benfica	0	0	0
(England) Chelsea	5	3	8
(Switzerland) Servette Chênois	2	0	2
(Spain) Atlético Madrid	4	5	9
(Serbia) Spartak Subotica	0	0	0
(Germany) VfL Wolfsburg	5	2	7
(Belarus) FC Minsk	0	1	1
(Norway) LSK Kvinner	2	0	2
(Poland) Górnik Łęczna	0	1	1
(France) Paris Saint-Germain	2	6	8
(Czech Republic) Sparta Prague	2	1	3
(Scotland) Glasgow City	1	0	1
(Italy) Juventus	2	0	2
(France) Lyon	3	3	6
(Norway) Vålerenga	1 (4)
(Denmark) Brøndby (p)	1 (5)
(Netherlands) PSV	1	1	2
(Spain) Barcelona	4	4	8
(Slovenia) Pomurje	0	2	2
(Denmark) Fortuna Hjørring	3	3	6
(Sweden) Kopparbergs/Göteborg	1	0	1
(England) Manchester City	2	3	5
(Italy) Fiorentina	2	1	3
(Czech Republic) Slavia Prague	2	0	2

Round of 16
(Kazakhstan) BIIK Kazygurt	1	0	1
(Germany) Bayern Munich	6	3	9
(Sweden) Rosengård	2	2	4
(Austria) St. Pölten	2	0	2
(England) Chelsea	2	1	3
(Spain) Atlético Madrid	0	1	1
(Germany) VfL Wolfsburg	2	2	4
(Norway) LSK Kvinner	0	0	0
(France) Paris Saint-Germain	5	0	5
(Czech Republic) Sparta Prague	0	3	3
(France) Lyon	2	3	5
(Denmark) Brøndby	0	1	1
(Spain) Barcelona	4	5	9
(Denmark) Fortuna Hjørring	0	0	0
(England) Manchester City	3	5	8
(Italy) Fiorentina	0	0	0

Quarter-finals
(Germany) Bayern Munich	3	1	4
(Sweden) Rosengård	0	0	0
(England) Chelsea	2	3	5
(Germany) VfL Wolfsburg	1	0	1
(France) Paris Saint-Germain (a)	0	2	2
(France) Lyon	1	1	2
(Spain) Barcelona	3	1	4
(England) Manchester City	0	2	2

Semi-finals
(Germany) Bayern Munich	2	1	3
(England) Chelsea	1	4	5
(France) Paris Saint-Germain	1	1	2
(Spain) Barcelona	1	2	3

Final
16 May – Gothenburg
(England) Chelsea	0
(Spain) Barcelona	4

=== Round of 32 ===
The draw for the round of 32 was held on 24 November 2020, 12:00 CET. The first legs were played on 9 and 10 December, and the second legs on 15, 16 and 17 December 2020. The tie between Vålerenga and Brøndby was played as a single-leg match in Brøndby on 11 February 2021 due to the quarantine restrictions imposed by the relevant Norwegian authorities in response to the COVID-19 pandemic in Norway.

Team 1	Agg.	Team 2	1st leg	2nd leg
St. Pölten (Austria)	3–0	(Switzerland) Zürich	2–0	1–0
Juventus (Italy)	2–6	(France) Lyon	2–3	0–3
Pomurje (Slovenia)	2–6	(Denmark) Fortuna Hjørring	0–3	2–3
PSV (Netherlands)	2–8	(Spain) Barcelona	1–4	1–4
Lanchkhuti (Georgia (country))	0–17	(Sweden) Rosengård	0–7	0–10
Spartak Subotica (Serbia)	0–7	(Germany) VfL Wolfsburg	0–5	0–2
Zhytlobud-2 Kharkiv (Ukraine)	2–2 (a)	(Kazakhstan) BIIK Kazygurt	2–1	0–1
FC Minsk (Belarus)	1–2	(Norway) LSK Kvinner	0–2	1–0
Kopparbergs/Göteborg (Sweden)	1–5	(England) Manchester City	1–2	0–3
Fiorentina (Italy)	3–2	(Czech Republic) Slavia Prague	2–2	1–0
Vålerenga (Norway)	1–1 (4–5 p)	(Denmark) Brøndby	—	1–1 (a.e.t.)
Górnik Łęczna (Poland)	1–8	(France) Paris Saint-Germain	0–2	1–6
Sparta Prague (Czech Republic)	3–1	(Scotland) Glasgow City	2–1	1–0
Benfica (Portugal)	0–8	(England) Chelsea	0–5	0–3
Ajax (Netherlands)	1–6	(Germany) Bayern Munich	1–3	0–3
Servette Chênois (Switzerland)	2–9	(Spain) Atlético Madrid	2–4	0–5

=== Round of 16 ===
The draw for the round of 16 was held on 16 February 2021, 12:00 CET. The first legs were played on 3, 4 and 9 March, and the second legs on 10, 11 and 17 March 2021.

Team 1	Agg.	Team 2	1st leg	2nd leg
VfL Wolfsburg (Germany)	4–0	(Norway) LSK Kvinner	2–0	2–0
Barcelona (Spain)	9–0	(Denmark) Fortuna Hjørring	4–0	5–0
Rosengård (Sweden)	4–2	(Austria) St. Pölten	2–2	2–0
BIIK Kazygurt (Kazakhstan)	1–9	(Germany) Bayern Munich	1–6	0–3
Manchester City (England)	8–0	(Italy) Fiorentina	3–0	5–0
Paris Saint-Germain (France)	5–3 (Note: Order of legs between Paris Saint-Germain and Sparta Prague reversed after original draw, due to quarantine of a large number of Sparta Prague players prior to the first leg.)	(Czech Republic) Sparta Prague	5–0	0–3 (awd.) (Note: The Sparta Prague v Paris Saint-Germain match could not be played due to quarantine of the Paris Saint-Germain players prior to the second leg. The match was awarded as a 3–0 win to Sparta Prague.)
Lyon (France)	5–1	(Denmark) Brøndby	2–0	3–1
Chelsea (England)	3–1	(Spain) Atlético Madrid	2–0	1–1

=== Quarter-finals ===
The draw for the quarter-finals was held on 12 March 2021, 12:00 CET. The first legs were played on 24 March, and the second legs on 31 March, 1 and 18 April 2021.

Team 1	Agg.	Team 2	1st leg	2nd leg
Bayern Munich (Germany)	4–0	(Sweden) Rosengård	3–0	1–0
Paris Saint-Germain (France)	2–2 (a)	(France) Lyon	0–1	2–1
Barcelona (Spain)	4–2	(England) Manchester City	3–0	1–2
Chelsea (England)	5–1	(Germany) VfL Wolfsburg	2–1	3–0

=== Semi-finals ===
The draw for the semi-finals was held on 12 March 2021, 12:00 CET (after the quarter-final draw). The first legs were played on 25 April and the second legs on 2 May 2021.

Team 1	Agg.	Team 2	1st leg	2nd leg
Paris Saint-Germain (France)	2–3	(Spain) Barcelona	1–1	1–2
Bayern Munich (Germany)	3–5	(England) Chelsea	2–1	1–4

=== Final ===
The final was played on 16 May 2021 at Gamla Ullevi, Gothenburg. A draw was held on 12 March 2021, 12:00 CET (after the quarter-final and semi-final draws), to determine which semi-final winner would be designated as the "home" team for administrative purposes.

16 May 2021
21:00 UTC+2

Chelsea (England)	0–4	(Spain) Barcelona
	Report	Leupolz 1' (o.g.); Putellas 14' (pen.); Bonmatí 21'; Hansen 36'

Gamla Ullevi, Gothenburg
Attendance: 0 (Note: The final was played behind closed doors due to the COVID-19 pandemic in Sweden.)
Referee: Riem Hussein (Germany)

== Statistics ==
=== Top goalscorers ===
There were 318 goals scored in 89 matches, with an average of 3.57 goals per match.

Goals scored in qualifying rounds count toward the topscorer award.

Rank	Player	Team	Goals		
Rank	Player	Team	Qual.	Tourn.	Total
1	(Spain) Jennifer Hermoso	(Spain) Barcelona	—	6	6
1	(England) Fran Kirby	(England) Chelsea	—	6	6
3	(Netherlands) Lieke Martens	(Spain) Barcelona	—	5	5
3	(United States) Sam Mewis	(England) Manchester City	—	5	5
5	(Serbia) Jelena Čanković	(Sweden) Rosengård	—	4	4
5	(Denmark) Pernille Harder	(England) Chelsea	—	4	4
5	(France) Marie-Antoinette Katoto	(France) Paris Saint-Germain	—	4	4
5	(Slovenia) Špela Kolbl	(Slovenia) Pomurje	3	1	4
5	(Germany) Sydney Lohmann	(Germany) Bayern Munich	—	4	4
5	(France) Melvine Malard	(France) Lyon	—	4	4
5	(Nigeria) Asisat Oshoala	(Spain) Barcelona	—	4	4
5	(Ukraine) Natia Pantsulaia	(Ukraine) Zhytlobud-2 Kharkiv	4	0	4
5	(Serbia) Violeta Slović	(Serbia) Spartak Subotica	4	0	4
5	(Denmark) Sanne Troelsgaard	(Sweden) Rosengård	—	4	4

Source: Soccerway

Notes

- — Denotes the team did not participate in this stage.

=== Squad of the season ===
The following 23 players were named in the squad of the season by the UEFA's technical observers:

Pos.	Player	Team(s)
GK	(Germany) Ann-Katrin Berger	(England) Chelsea
GK	(Chile) Christiane Endler	(France) Paris Saint-Germain
GK	(Spain) Sandra Paños	(Spain) Barcelona
DF	(Sweden) Magdalena Eriksson	(England) Chelsea
DF	(Germany) Marina Hegering	(Germany) Bayern Munich
DF	(Germany) Kathrin Hendrich	(Germany) VfL Wolfsburg
DF	(Canada) Ashley Lawrence	(France) Paris Saint-Germain
DF	(Spain) María Pilar León	(Spain) Barcelona
DF	(Spain) Irene Paredes	(France) Paris Saint-Germain
MF	(Spain) Aitana Bonmati	(Spain) Barcelona
MF	(France) Grace Geyoro	(France) Paris Saint-Germain
MF	(Spain) Patricia Guijarro	(Spain) Barcelona
MF	(Wales) Sophie Ingle	(England) Chelsea
MF	(Germany) Sydney Lohmann	(Germany) Bayern Munich
MF	(Germany) Lina Magull	(Germany) Bayern Munich
MF	(United States) Sam Mewis	(England) Manchester City
MF	(Spain) Alexia Putellas	(Spain) Barcelona
FW	(Norway) Caroline Graham Hansen	(Spain) Barcelona
FW	(Denmark) Pernille Harder	(England) Chelsea
FW	(Spain) Jennifer Hermoso	(Spain) Barcelona
FW	(Australia) Sam Kerr	(England) Chelsea
FW	(England) Fran Kirby	(England) Chelsea
FW	(Netherlands) Lieke Martens	(Spain) Barcelona

=== Players of the season ===
Votes were cast for players of the season by coaches of the sixteen teams who participated in the tournament's round of 16, together with twenty journalists selected by the European Sports Media (ESM) group who specialize in women's football. The coaches were not allowed to vote for players from their own teams. Jury members selected their top three players, with the first receiving five points, the second three and the third one. The shortlist of the top three players was announced on 13 August 2021. The award winners were announced and presented during the 2021–22 UEFA Champions League group stage draw in Turkey on 26 August 2021.

==== Goalkeeper of the season ====
Rank	Player	Team(s)	Points
Shortlist of top three
1	(Spain) Sandra Paños	(Spain) Barcelona	95
2	(Chile) Christiane Endler	(France) Paris Saint-Germain	90
3	(Germany) Ann-Katrin Berger	(England) Chelsea	60
Players ranked 4–7
4	(England) Ellie Roebuck	(England) Manchester City	8
5	(France) Sarah Bouhaddi	(France) Lyon	4
6	(Poland) Katarzyna Kiedrzynek	(Germany) VfL Wolfsburg	3
7	(France) Pauline Peyraud-Magnin	(Spain) Atlético Madrid	1

==== Defender of the season ====
Rank	Player	Team(s)	Points
Shortlist of top three
1	(Spain) Irene Paredes	(France) Paris Saint-Germain	62
2	(Spain) Mapi León	(Spain) Barcelona	56
3	(Sweden) Magdalena Eriksson	(England) Chelsea	42
Players ranked 4–10
4	(Canada) Ashley Lawrence	(France) Paris Saint-Germain	29
5	(Germany) Marina Hegering	(Germany) Bayern Munich	24
6	(France) Wendie Renard	(France) Lyon	16
7	(Spain) Marta Torrejón	(Spain) Barcelona	9
8	(England) Millie Bright	(England) Chelsea	6
9	(Spain) Laia Aleixandri	(Spain) Atlético Madrid	3
9	(England) Lucy Bronze	(England) Manchester City	3

==== Midfielder of the season ====
Rank	Player	Team(s)	Points
Shortlist of top three
1	(Spain) Alexia Putellas	(Spain) Barcelona	78
2	(Spain) Aitana Bonmatí	(Spain) Barcelona	65
3	(South Korea) Ji So-yun	(England) Chelsea	15
Players ranked 4–10
4	(United States) Sam Mewis	(England) Manchester City	14
5	(Germany) Sara Däbritz	(France) Paris Saint-Germain	12
6	(Spain) Patri Guijarro	(Spain) Barcelona	11
6	(Wales) Sophie Ingle	(England) Chelsea	11
8	(France) Kheira Hamraoui	(Spain) Barcelona	9
9	(France) Grace Geyoro	(France) Paris Saint-Germain	7
10	(Germany) Dzsenifer Marozsán	(France) Lyon	6

==== Forward of the season ====
Rank	Player	Team(s)	Points
Shortlist of top three
1	(Spain) Jennifer Hermoso	(Spain) Barcelona	70
2	(Netherlands) Lieke Martens	(Spain) Barcelona	42
3	(Norway) Caroline Graham Hansen	(Spain) Barcelona	39
Players ranked 4–10
4	(England) Fran Kirby	(England) Chelsea	34
5	(Denmark) Pernille Harder	(England) Chelsea	25
6	(Australia) Sam Kerr	(England) Chelsea	21
7	(England) Lauren Hemp	(England) Manchester City	10
8	(France) Marie-Antoinette Katoto	(France) Paris Saint-Germain	6
9	(France) Kadidiatou Diani	(France) Paris Saint-Germain	3
9	(Nigeria) Asisat Oshoala	(Spain) Barcelona	3

== See also ==
- 2020–21 UEFA Champions League
