= 2020–21 UEFA Women's Champions League qualifying rounds =

Tournament details
- Dates: 3–19 November 2020
- Teams: 40 (from 40 associations)

Tournament statistics
- Matches played: 30
- Goals scored: 117 (3.9 per match)
- Attendance: 1,388 (46 per match)
- Top scorer(s): (Ukraine) Natia Pantsulaia (Serbia) Violeta Slović (4 goals each)

The 2020–21 UEFA Women's Champions League qualifying rounds was played between 3 and 19 November 2020. A total of 40 teams competed in the qualifying rounds to decide ten of the 32 places in the knockout phase of the 2020–21 UEFA Women's Champions League.

Times are CET (UTC+1), as listed by UEFA (local times, if different, are in parentheses).

== Teams ==
The qualifying rounds included 28 league champions from associations ranked 13 or lower, and two runners-up from associations ranked 11 and 12.

Below are the forty teams which participated in the qualifying round (with their 2020 UEFA women's club coefficients, which took into account their performance in European competitions since 2015–2016 season, plus 33% of their association coefficient from the same time span).

Key to colours
Winners of second qualifying round advanced to round of 32

First qualifying round
Team	Coeff.
(Scotland) Glasgow City	36.590
(Belarus) FC Minsk	25.270
(Austria) St. Pölten	23.950
(Serbia) Spartak Subotica	20.615
(Lithuania) Gintra Universitetas	19.285
(Cyprus) Apollon Limassol	16.280
(Bosnia and Herzegovina) SFK 2000	15.960
(Romania) Olimpia Cluj	14.630
(Greece) PAOK	10.635
(Belgium) Anderlecht	10.125
(Kazakhstan) Okzhetpes	9.570
(Hungary) Ferencváros	9.470
(Albania) Vllaznia	9.310
(Norway) Vålerenga	9.075
(Iceland) Valur	8.580
(Poland) Górnik Łęczna	8.285
(Russia) CSKA Moscow	7.425
(Slovenia) Pomurje	6.980
(Bulgaria) NSA Sofia	5.985
(Ukraine) Zhytlobud-2 Kharkiv	4.800
(Kosovo) Mitrovica	4.320
(Slovakia) Slovan Bratislava	4.320
(Montenegro) Breznica Pljevlja	3.990
(Portugal) Benfica	3.960
(Israel) Ramat HaSharon	3.650
(Finland) HJK	3.465
(Faroe Islands) KÍ	3.325
(Croatia) Split	3.310
(Estonia) Flora	2.485
(Republic of Ireland) Peamount United	2.475
(Turkey) ALG Spor	2.475
(Northern Ireland) Linfield	1.660
(Latvia) Rīgas FS	1.330
(Wales) Swansea City	1.155
(Malta) Birkirkara	0.830
(Moldova) Agarista Anenii Noi	0.165
(Armenia) Alashkert	0.000
(Georgia (country)) Lanchkhuti	0.000
(Luxembourg) Racing FC	0.000
(North Macedonia) Kamenica Sasa	0.000

== Format ==
In a change to the format as a result of the COVID-19 pandemic in Europe, the qualifying rounds were played as two playoff rounds, each consisting of single-legged matches hosted by one of the teams decided by draw. If scores were level at the end of normal time, extra time was played, followed by a penalty shoot-out if the scores remained tied.

== Schedule ==
The schedule of the competition was as follows (all draws were held at the UEFA headquarters in Nyon, Switzerland). The tournament would have originally started in August 2020, but was initially delayed to October due to the COVID-19 pandemic in Europe. However, due to the continuing pandemic in Europe, UEFA announced a new format and schedule on 16 September 2020.

Round	Draw date	Match dates
First qualifying round	22 October 2020	3–4 November 2020
Second qualifying round	6 November 2020	18–19 November 2020

The qualifying round was originally scheduled to be played as mini-tournaments. The original match dates were 12, 15 and 18 August 2020, and were later postponed to 7, 10 and 13 October 2020.

== First qualifying round ==
The draw for the first qualifying round was held on 22 October 2020, 12:00 CEST.

=== Seeding ===
The forty teams were seeded based on their UEFA women's club coefficients. Prior to the draw, they were divided into ten groups of four teams, each containing two seeded teams and two unseeded teams, based on political restrictions (teams from Russia/Kosovo, Serbia/Kosovo, Bosnia and Herzegovina/Kosovo could not be drawn against each other), COVID-19 travel restrictions and geographical approach. The teams in each group were assigned a number, with seeded teams randomly assigned either 1 or 2, and unseeded teams randomly assigned either 3 or 4. Four numbered balls were drawn, with the results applied to all Groups 1–10, such that a seeded team numbered 1 or 2 would play an unseeded team numbered 3 or 4 in each tie, with the first team drawn to be the home team.

Group 1		Group 2		Group 3		Group 4	
Seeded	Unseeded	Seeded	Unseeded	Seeded	Unseeded	Seeded	Unseeded
(Belarus) FC Minsk (2); (Russia) CSKA Moscow (1)	(Estonia) Flora (3); (Latvia) Rīgas FS (4)	(Serbia) Spartak Subotica (1); (Slovenia) Pomurje (2)	(Montenegro) Breznica Pljevlja (4); (Moldova) Agarista Anenii Noi (3)	(Kazakhstan) Okzhetpes (2); (Ukraine) Zhytlobud-2 Kharkiv (1)	(Armenia) Alashkert (3); (Georgia (country)) Lanchkhuti (4)	(Norway) Vålerenga (2); (Iceland) Valur (1)	(Finland) HJK (3); (Faroe Islands) KÍ (4)
Group 5		Group 6		Group 7		Group 8	
Seeded	Unseeded	Seeded	Unseeded	Seeded	Unseeded	Seeded	Unseeded
(Cyprus) Apollon Limassol (2); (Poland) Górnik Łęczna (1)	(Croatia) Split (3); (Wales) Swansea City (4)	(Lithuania) Gintra Universitetas (1); (Hungary) Ferencváros (2)	(Slovakia) Slovan Bratislava (3); (Luxembourg) Racing FC (4)	(Austria) St. Pölten (1); (Bulgaria) NSA Sofia (2)	(Kosovo) Mitrovica (3); (North Macedonia) Kamenica Sasa (4)	(Scotland) Glasgow City (2); (Belgium) Anderlecht (1)	(Republic of Ireland) Peamount United (4); (Northern Ireland) Linfield (3)
Group 9		Group 10					
Seeded	Unseeded	Seeded	Unseeded				
(Romania) Olimpia Cluj (2); (Greece) PAOK (1)	(Portugal) Benfica (3); (Malta) Birkirkara (4)	(Bosnia and Herzegovina) SFK 2000 (2); (Albania) Vllaznia (1)	(Israel) Ramat HaSharon (4); (Turkey) ALG Spor (3)				

=== Summary ===
The matches were played on 3 and 4 November 2020.

Team 1	Score	Team 2
CSKA Moscow (Russia)	2–0	(Estonia) Flora
FC Minsk (Belarus)	3–0	(Latvia) Rīgas FS
Spartak Subotica (Serbia)	4–0	(Moldova) Agarista Anenii Noi
Pomurje (Slovenia)	3–0	(Montenegro) Breznica Pljevlja
Zhytlobud-2 Kharkiv (Ukraine)	9–0	(Armenia) Alashkert
Okzhetpes (Kazakhstan)	1–2 (a.e.t.)	(Georgia (country)) Lanchkhuti
Valur (Iceland)	3–0	(Finland) HJK
Vålerenga (Norway)	7–0	(Faroe Islands) KÍ
Górnik Łęczna (Poland)	4–1	(Croatia) Split
Apollon Limassol (Cyprus)	3–0	(Wales) Swansea City
Gintra Universitetas (Lithuania)	4–0	(Slovakia) Slovan Bratislava
Ferencváros (Hungary)	6–1	(Luxembourg) Racing FC
St. Pölten (Austria)	2–0	(Kosovo) Mitrovica
NSA Sofia (Bulgaria)	3–1	(North Macedonia) Kamenica Sasa
Anderlecht (Belgium)	8–0	(Northern Ireland) Linfield
Glasgow City (Scotland)	0–0 (a.e.t.) (6–5 p)	(Republic of Ireland) Peamount United
PAOK (Greece)	1–3	(Portugal) Benfica
Olimpia Cluj (Romania)	2–1	(Malta) Birkirkara
Vllaznia (Albania)	3–3 (a.e.t.) (3–2 p)	(Turkey) ALG Spor
SFK 2000 (Bosnia and Herzegovina)	4–0	(Israel) Ramat HaSharon

=== Matches ===
4 November 2020
15:00 (17:00 MSK)

CSKA Moscow (Russia)	2–0	(Estonia) Flora
Smirnova 57'; Bespalikova 79'	Report

VEB Arena, Moscow
Attendance: 646
Referee: Jelena Međedović (Serbia)

4 November 2020
10:00 (12:00 FET)

FC Minsk (Belarus)	3–0	(Latvia) Rīgas FS
Kubichnaya 18'; Shmatko 58' (pen.); Akaba 80' (pen.)	Report

FC Minsk Stadium, Minsk
Attendance: 0
Referee: Oxana Cruc (Moldova)

4 November 2020
19:00

Spartak Subotica (Serbia)	4–0	(Moldova) Agarista Anenii Noi
Filipović 32'; Slović 60', 70', 90+2'	Report

Subotica City Stadium, Subotica
Attendance: 0
Referee: Merima Čelik (Bosnia and Herzegovina)

4 November 2020
13:00

Pomurje (Slovenia)	3–0	(Montenegro) Breznica Pljevlja
Kolbl 39', 65'; Kajzba 80'	Report

Stadion Gornja Radgona, Gornja Radgona
Attendance: 0
Referee: Catarina Campos (Portugal)

4 November 2020
13:00 (14:00 EET)

Zhytlobud-2 Kharkiv (Ukraine)	9–0	(Armenia) Alashkert
Filenko 6'; Kalinina 38' (pen.), 46'; Malakhova 42'; Tytova 50' (pen.); Andrukhiv 56'; Pantsulaia 78', 81', 87'	Report

Bannikov Stadium, Kyiv
Attendance: 0
Referee: Ana Terteleac (Romania)

4 November 2020
10:00 (15:00 ALMT)

Okzhetpes (Kazakhstan)	1–2 (a.e.t.)	(Georgia (country)) Lanchkhuti
Nurusheva 5'	Report	Tchkonia 62', 95'

Kazhymukan Munaitpasov Stadium, Shymkent
Attendance: 0
Referee: Cansu Tiryaki (Turkey)

4 November 2020
16:00 (15:00 WET)

Valur (Iceland)	3–0	(Finland) HJK
Jónsdóttir 8'; Jensen 20'; Edvardsdóttir 36' (pen.)	Report

Hlíðarendi, Reykjavík
Attendance: 0
Referee: Maika Vanderstichel (France)

4 November 2020
18:00

Vålerenga (Norway)	7–0	(Faroe Islands) KÍ
Jensen 23' (pen.); Nchout 25', 70'; Thomsen 27'; Tomter 79'; Bott 81'; Nygård 90+1'	Report

Intility Arena, Oslo
Attendance: 200
Referee: Ioanna Allayiotou (Cyprus)

4 November 2020
18:00

Górnik Łęczna (Poland)	4–1	(Croatia) Split
Hmírová 32', 71'; Karczewska 68'; Zdunek 78'	Report	Medić 77'

Stadion Górnika Łęczna, Łęczna
Attendance: 0
Referee: Louise Thompson (Northern Ireland)

4 November 2020
14:00 (15:00 EET)

Apollon Limassol (Cyprus)	3–0	(Wales) Swansea City
Hardy 5'; Freda 44' (pen.), 56'	Report

GSZ Stadium, Larnaca
Attendance: 0
Referee: Justina Lavrenovaitė-Perez (Lithuania)

4 November 2020
14:00 (15:00 EET)

Gintra Universitetas (Lithuania)	4–0	(Slovakia) Slovan Bratislava
Kass 66'; Carchio 79'; Mucherera 85'; Corneil 90' (pen.)	Report

Savivaldybė Stadium, Šiauliai
Attendance: 151
Referee: Ifeoma Kulmala (Finland)

3 November 2020
17:00

Ferencváros (Hungary)	6–1	(Luxembourg) Racing FC
Ivanuša 6'; Vágó 7', 62'; Pusztai 42', 45+3'; Cameron 58'	Report	Silva Machado 25'

Ferencváros Stadion, Budapest
Attendance: 391
Referee: Emanuela Rusta (Albania)

4 November 2020
16:00

St. Pölten (Austria)	2–0	(Kosovo) Mitrovica
Klein 26'; Eder 61' (pen.)	Report

NV Arena, Sankt Pölten
Attendance: 0
Referee: Katarzyna Lisiecka-Sęk (Poland)

4 November 2020
13:00 (14:00 EET)

NSA Sofia (Bulgaria)	3–1	(North Macedonia) Kamenica Sasa
Penkova 17', 45+1'; Georgieva 44' (o.g.)	Report	Dimitrovska 35'

Vasil Levski National Stadium, Sofia
Attendance: 0
Referee: Marina Krupskaya (Russia)

4 November 2020
19:30

Anderlecht (Belgium)	8–0	(Northern Ireland) Linfield
De Neve 10', 40'; Wijnants 11', 17'; De Caigny 31', 66'; Wullaert 43', 72'	Report

Constant Vanden Stock Stadium, Brussels
Attendance: 0
Referee: Michèle Schmölzer (Switzerland)

4 November 2020
20:00 (19:00 GMT)

Glasgow City (Scotland)	0–0 (a.e.t.)	(Republic of Ireland) Peamount United
	Report
Penalties
Ross (penalty scored); Howat (penalty scored); Crichton (penalty scored); Fulton (penalty scored); Love (penalty missed); McLauchlan (penalty scored); Wyne (penalty scored)	6–5	(penalty scored) Lynch; (penalty scored) McEvoy; (penalty missed) O'Gorman; (penalty scored) Ryan-Doyle; (penalty scored) Duggan; (penalty scored) Walsh; (penalty missed) O'Callaghan

Broadwood Stadium, Cumbernauld
Attendance: 0
Referee: Sabina Bolić (Croatia)

4 November 2020
13:30 (14:30 EET)

PAOK (Greece)	1–3	(Portugal) Benfica
Vardali 57'	Report	Araújo 3'; Lacasse 44'; Amado 61'

Makedonikos Stadium, Thessaloniki
Attendance: 0
Referee: Kirsty Dowle (England)

3 November 2020
14:00 (15:00 EET)

Olimpia Cluj (Romania)	2–1	(Malta) Birkirkara
Vella 56' (o.g.); Ciolacu 63'	Report	Sultana 45+11'

Cluj Arena, Cluj-Napoca
Attendance: 0
Referee: Alexandra Deligianni (Greece)

3 November 2020
14:00

Vllaznia (Albania)	3–3 (a.e.t.)	(Turkey) ALG Spor
Gjini 7', 70'; Bajraktari 120+2'	Report	Seyfatdinova 53'; Arhan 73'; Civelek 118'
Penalties
Doci (penalty missed); Franja (penalty scored); Bajraktari (penalty scored); Gjini (penalty scored)	3–2	(penalty scored) Topçu; (penalty missed) Arhan; (penalty missed) Yanaç; (penalty scored) Hız; (penalty missed) Esen

Loro Boriçi Stadium, Shkodër
Attendance: 0
Referee: Meitar Shemesh (Israel)

3 November 2020
15:00

SFK 2000 (Bosnia and Herzegovina)	4–0	(Israel) Ramat HaSharon
Kapetanović 45'; Kuć 67'; Milinković 76'; Jelčić 83'	Report

Bosnia and Herzegovina FA Training Centre, Zenica
Attendance: 0
Referee: Irena Velevačkoska (North Macedonia)

== Second qualifying round ==
The draw for the second qualifying round was held on 6 November 2020, 12:00 CET.

=== Seeding ===
The twenty winners of the first qualifying round were seeded based on their UEFA women's club coefficients. Prior to the draw, they were divided into five groups of four teams, each containing two seeded teams and two unseeded teams, based on COVID-19 travel restrictions and geographical approach. The teams in each group were assigned a number, with seeded teams randomly assigned either 1 or 2, and unseeded teams randomly assigned either 3 or 4. Four numbered balls were drawn, with the results applied to all Groups 1–5, such that a seeded team numbered 1 or 2 would play an unseeded team numbered 3 or 4 in each tie, with the first team drawn to be the home team.

Group 1		Group 2		Group 3	
Seeded	Unseeded	Seeded	Unseeded	Seeded	Unseeded
(Lithuania) Gintra Universitetas (1); (Cyprus) Apollon Limassol (2)	(Norway) Vålerenga (4); (Poland) Górnik Łęczna (3)	(Belgium) Anderlecht (1); (Hungary) Ferencváros (2)	(Slovenia) Pomurje (3); (Portugal) Benfica (4)	(Serbia) Spartak Subotica (2); (Bosnia and Herzegovina) SFK 2000 (1)	(Bulgaria) NSA Sofia (3); (Ukraine) Zhytlobud-2 Kharkiv (4)
Group 4		Group 5			
Seeded	Unseeded	Seeded	Unseeded		
(Scotland) Glasgow City (2); (Austria) St. Pölten (1)	(Iceland) Valur (3); (Russia) CSKA Moscow (4)	(Belarus) FC Minsk (2); (Romania) Olimpia Cluj (1)	(Albania) Vllaznia (3); (Georgia (country)) Lanchkhuti (4)		

=== Summary ===
The matches were played on 18 and 19 November 2020.

Team 1	Score	Team 2
Górnik Łęczna (Poland)	2–1	(Cyprus) Apollon Limassol
Gintra Universitetas (Lithuania)	0–7	(Norway) Vålerenga
Pomurje (Slovenia)	4–1	(Hungary) Ferencváros
Anderlecht (Belgium)	1–2	(Portugal) Benfica
NSA Sofia (Bulgaria)	0–7	(Serbia) Spartak Subotica
SFK 2000 (Bosnia and Herzegovina)	0–2	(Ukraine) Zhytlobud-2 Kharkiv
Valur (Iceland)	1–1 (a.e.t.) (3–4 p)	(Scotland) Glasgow City
St. Pölten (Austria)	1–0	(Russia) CSKA Moscow
Vllaznia (Albania)	0–2	(Belarus) FC Minsk
Olimpia Cluj (Romania)	0–1	(Georgia (country)) Lanchkhuti

=== Matches ===
18 November 2020
17:30

Górnik Łęczna (Poland)	2–1	(Cyprus) Apollon Limassol
Kamczyk 81'; Zdunek 83'	Report	Freda 3' (pen.)

Stadion Górnika Łęczna, Łęczna
Attendance: 0
Referee: Lizzy van Der Helm (Netherlands)

19 November 2020
12:00 (13:00 EET)

Gintra Universitetas (Lithuania)	0–7	(Norway) Vålerenga
	Report	Sigurðardóttir 19'; Pedersen 33'; Stefanović 45+1', 61'; Nchout 62'; Neverdauskaitė 70' (o.g.); Jensen 89'

Telšiai City Central Stadium, Telšiai
Attendance: 0
Referee: Victoria Beyer (France)

18 November 2020
13:00

Pomurje (Slovenia)	4–1	(Hungary) Ferencváros
Kolbl 27'; Korošec 37' (pen.), 73', 80'	Report	Mosdóczi 57' (pen.)

Stadion Gornja Radgona, Gornja Radgona
Attendance: 0
Referee: Lois Otte (Belgium)

18 November 2020
19:30

Anderlecht (Belgium)	1–2	(Portugal) Benfica
Tison 55'	Report	Raysla 62', 78'

Constant Vanden Stock Stadium, Brussels
Attendance: 0
Referee: Henrikke Nervik (Norway)

18 November 2020
13:00 (14:00 EET)

NSA Sofia (Bulgaria)	0–7	(Serbia) Spartak Subotica
	Report	Slović 10' (pen.); Filipović 19'; Matić 42', 72', 90+3'; Ćirić 69'; Baka 74'

Vasil Levski National Stadium, Sofia
Attendance: 0
Referee: Marina Aufschnaiter (Austria)

19 November 2020
14:00

SFK 2000 (Bosnia and Herzegovina)	0–2	(Ukraine) Zhytlobud-2 Kharkiv
	Report	Pantsulaia 9'; Kravchuk 29'

Bosnia and Herzegovina FA Training Centre, Zenica
Attendance: 0
Referee: María Dolores Martínez Madrona (Spain)

18 November 2020
15:00 (14:00 WET)

Valur (Iceland)	1–1 (a.e.t.)	(Scotland) Glasgow City
Edvardsdóttir 80'	Report	Crichton 51'
Penalties
Jónsdóttir (penalty missed); Gísladóttir (penalty missed); Jensen (penalty scored); Eiríksdóttir (penalty scored); Halldórsdóttir (penalty scored); Eiríksdóttir (penalty missed)	3–4	(penalty scored) Crichton; (penalty missed) Fulton; (penalty missed) Love; (penalty scored) Wade; (penalty scored) Shine; (penalty scored) Wyne

Hlíðarendi, Reykjavík
Attendance: 0
Referee: Aleksandra Česen (Slovenia)

19 November 2020
17:00

St. Pölten (Austria)	1–0	(Russia) CSKA Moscow
Eder 60' (pen.)	Report

NV Arena, Sankt Pölten
Attendance: 0
Referee: Jelena Pejković (Croatia)

19 November 2020
14:00

Vllaznia (Albania)	0–2	(Belarus) FC Minsk
	Report	Sas 33'; Kharlanova 84'

Loro Boriçi Stadium, Shkodër
Attendance: 0
Referee: Abigail Marriott (England)

19 November 2020
14:00 (15:00 EET)

Olimpia Cluj (Romania)	0–1	(Georgia (country)) Lanchkhuti
	Report	Tchkonia 64'

Cluj Arena, Cluj-Napoca
Attendance: 0
Referee: Zuzana Valentová (Slovakia)
