= Pantsulaia =

Pantsulaia (Georgian: ფანცულაია) is a Georgian surname that may refer to the following notable people:

- Giorgi Pantsulaia (born 1994), Georgian football forward
- Levan Pantsulaia (born 1986), Georgian chess grandmaster
- Mamuka Pantsulaia (1967–2019), Georgian football forward, father of Giorgi
- Natia Pantsulaia (born 1991), Ukrainian football midfielder of Georgian descent
