= 2019–20 Kategoria Superiore Femra =

Kategoria Superiore Femra
- Season: 2019–20
- Dates: 12 October 2019 – 13 July 2020
- Champions: Vllaznia
- Champions League: Vllaznia
- Matches: 90
- Goals: 715 (7.94 per match)
- Top goalscorer: Megi Doçi (88)
- Biggest home win: Apolonia 17–0 Maliqi (10 June 2020)
- Biggest away win: Dajti 0–21 Vllaznia (24 June 2020)
- Highest scoring: Dajti 0–21 Vllaznia (24 June 2020)
- Longest winning run: 15 matches Vllaznia
- Longest unbeaten run: 18 matches Vllaznia
- Longest winless run: 14 matches Bilisht Sport
- Longest losing run: 14 matches Bilisht Sport

The 2019–20 Kategoria Superiore Femra was the 11th season of women's professional football, organized by the Albanian Football Federation.

The competition was suspended from March 12 until June 6, 2020, due to the COVID-19 pandemic in Albania.

Locations of teams from the 2019–20 season

== League table ==
Pos	Team	Pld	W	D	L	GF	GA	GD	Pts
1	Vllaznia (Note: Vllaznia qualified to the UEFA Champions League qualifying round.) (C)	18	17	1	0	170	4	+166	52
2	Apolonia	18	15	2	1	155	9	+146	47
3	Tirana AS	18	12	2	4	79	31	+48	38
4	Juban Danja	18	12	1	5	81	38	+43	37
5	Kinostudio	18	9	2	7	97	60	+37	29
6	AAS	18	9	0	9	59	83	−24	27
7	Teuta	18	5	1	12	42	93	−51	16
8	Maliqi	18	3	1	14	23	119	−96	10
9	Dajti	18	2	0	16	8	144	−136	6
10	Bilisht Sport	18	1	0	17	1	134	−133	3

Updated to match(es) played on 13 July 2020. Source:
(C) Champions

== Results ==
Home \ Away	AAS	APF	BIL	DAJ	JUB	KIN	MLQ	TEU	TAS	VLL
AAS	—	0–15	6–0	6–1	1–4	2–9	4–1	7–2	1–9	0–9
Apolonia	12–0	—	13–0	10–0	3–1	11–1	17–0	11–0	5–0	0–0
Bilisht Sport	0–7	0–12	—	1–0	0–8	0–8	0–9	0–6	0–8	0–12
Dajti	0–8	0–13	3–0	—	0–8	0–5	2–0	0–9	0–7	0–21
Juban Danja	5–1	1–4	5–0	12–0	—	7–3	11–0	5–0	3–1	0–5
FC Kinostudio	3–5	1–7	12–0	11–1	3–3	—	12–0	11–3	0–0	0–4
Maliqi	0–4	1–10	4–0	6–0	0–3	0–10	—	1–1	0–8	0–10
Teuta	3–4	1–11	1–0	7–0	2–4	0–6	6–0	—	0–5	0–9
Tirana AS	3–2	1–1	6–0	7–1	4–1	5–1	6–1	7–0	—	1–4
Vllaznia	7–1	2–0	14–0	13–0	10–0	12–1	14–0	12–1	11–0	—

Updated to match(es) played on 13 July 2020. Source:
Legend: Blue = home team win; Yellow = draw; Red = away team win.
For upcoming matches, an "a" indicates there is an article about the rivalry between the two participants.
