= Jasmin Eder =

Austrian footballer

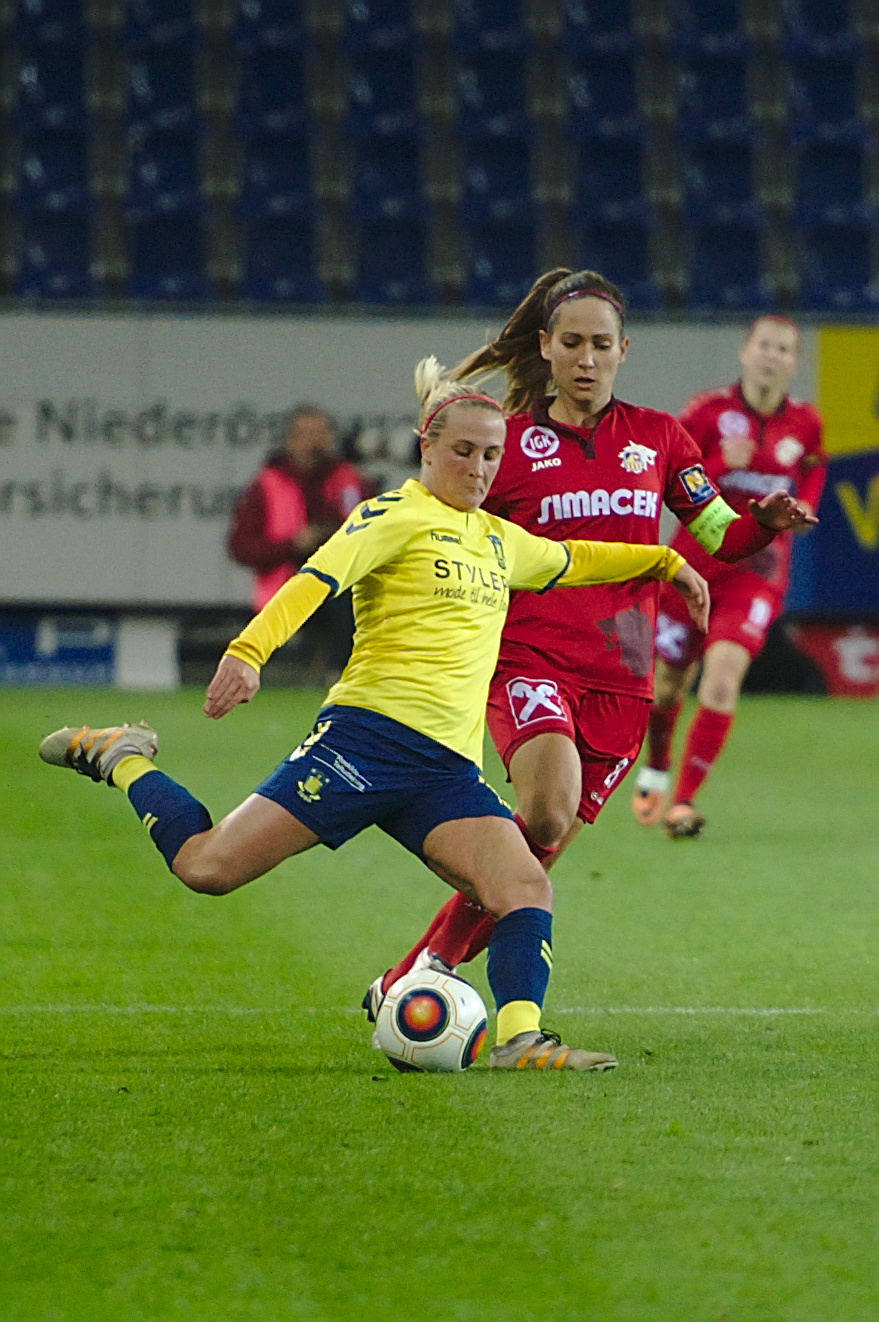
- Eder playing for SKN in 2016

Personal information
- Date of birth: 8 October 1992 (age 34)
- Place of birth: Austria
- Height: 1.70 m (5 ft 7 in)
- Position: Midfielder

Team information
- Current team: SKN St. Pölten
- Number: 27

Senior career*
Years	Team	Apps	(Gls)
2009–2011	FC Bayern München		
2011–2012	BV Cloppenburg		
2012–2013	VfL Sindelfingen		
2013–	SKN St. Pölten	31	(14)

International career^{‡}
2011–	Austria	54	(1)
- * Club domestic league appearances and goals as of 21:45, 31 July 2022 (UTC) ‡ National team caps and goals as of 23 June 2010

Jasmin Eder (born 8 October 1992) is an Austrian women's international footballer. She was a member of the Austria women's national football team from 2011 to 2013, playing 12 matches. She was part of the team at the 2014 Algarve Cup. On club level she played for FC Bayern München, BV Cloppenburg and VfL Sindelfingen.

== International career ==
Eder was part of the 23-women squad who represented Austria and reached the semi-finals at the UEFA Women's Euro 2017.

Eder was part of the squad that was called up to the UEFA Women's Euro 2022.
