= 2019–20 Belgian Women's Super League =

Belgian Women's Super League
- Season: 2019–20
- Dates: 23 August 2019 – 27 March 2020
- Champions: RSC Anderlecht
- Biggest home win: Anderlecht 7–0 OH Leuven
- Biggest away win: OH Leuven 1–7 Genk
- All statistics correct as of 5 April 2020.

The 2019–20 Belgian Women's Super League season was the 5th edition since its establishment in 2015. Anderlecht were the defending champions.

In the second half of the season the competition was cancelled because of the COVID-19 pandemic in Belgium. The current standings were declared final and Anderlecht were awarded the championship. It marked their third title in a row.

== Teams ==
Location of the 2018–19 Belgian Super League teams

=== Stadia and locations ===
Club	Location	Venue	Capacity
RSC Anderlecht	Anderlecht	Centre National de Football Euro 2000	1,000
Ladies Genk	Genk	SportinGenk Park	2,000
AA Gent Ladies	Ghent	PGB-Stadion	6,500
Club Brugge	Bruges	Jan Breydel Stadium	29,062
Oud-Heverlee Leuven	Heverlee	Gemeentelijk Stadion	3,330
Standard Fémina de Liège	Liège	Académie Robert Louis-Dreyfus	1,000

== League Standings ==
In the first stage teams were to play each other four times, for 20 matches each. Then the second round would have followed.

=== League table ===
The final standings before the season was cancelled were.

Pos	Team	Pld	W	D	L	GF	GA	GD	Pts	Qualification or relegation
1	RSC Anderlecht (C)	16	14	2	0	42	7	+35	44	Qualification for Championship Round
2	Standard Fémina de Liège	17	12	0	5	38	16	+22	36	Qualification for Championship Round
3	AA Gent Ladies	17	9	2	6	37	25	+12	29	Qualification for Championship Round
4	Ladies Genk	16	7	2	7	31	24	+7	23	Qualification for Championship Round
5	Club Brugge	17	4	1	12	17	40	−23	13	Relegation Play-off
6	Oud-Heverlee Leuven	17	0	1	16	8	61	−53	1	Relegation Play-off

Updated to match(es) played on 29 February 2020 (final matchday). Source: Soccerway
Rules for classification: 1) points; 2) goal difference; 3) goals scored
(C) Champions
