= Natia Pantsulaia =

Ukrainian footballer

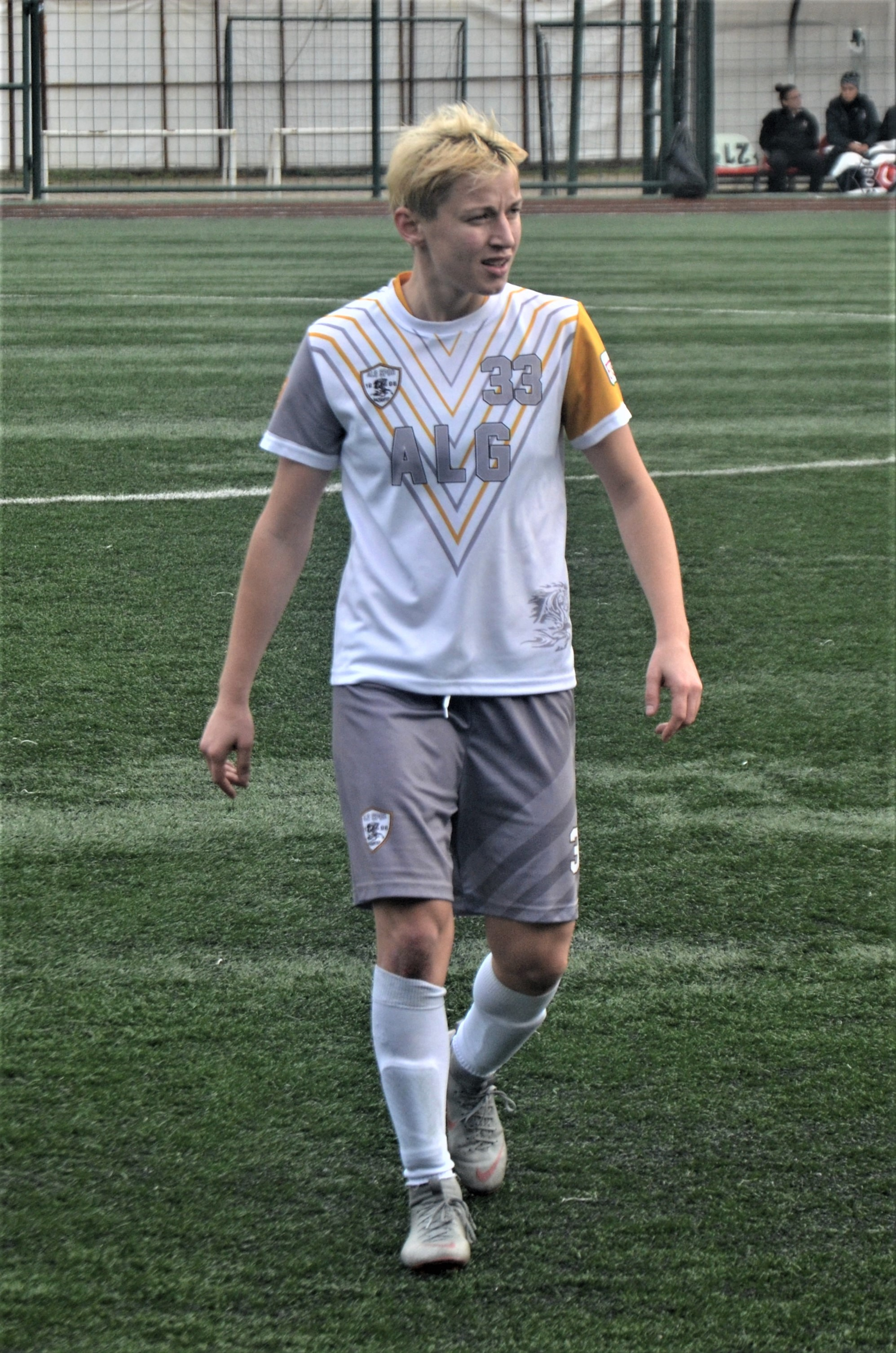
- Natia Pantsulaia for ALG Spor (November 2018)

Personal information
- Date of birth: 28 December 1991 (age 34)
- Place of birth: Ukraine
- Position: Midfielder

Team information
- Current team: Vorskla Poltava

Senior career*
Years	Team	Apps	(Gls)
2009–2012	Rodyna-Litsey Kostopil	22	(8)
2014–2015	Ukrayinka Ternopil	18	(8)
2016–2017	Zhytlobud-1 Kharkiv	18	(2)
2017–2018	Lehenda-ShVSM Chernihiv	11	(1)
2018–2019	ALG Spor	17	(0)
2019	Atlético Madrid		
2019–2020	ALG Spor		
2020-2021	Vorskla Poltava	0	(0)

International career^{‡}
2009	Ukraine U-19		
2017–	Ukraine	18	(2)
- * Club domestic league appearances and goals as of 1 March 2020 ‡ National team caps and goals as of 9 April 2018

Natia Pantsulaia (Ukrainian: Натія Панцулая, born 28 December 1991) is a Ukrainian footballer of Georgian descent who plays as midfielder for Vorskla Poltava in the Ukrainian Women's League and in the Ukraine national team.

== Playing career ==
=== Club ===
Pantsulaia played in Ukraine for FC Rodyna Lyceum in Kostopil and FC Ternopolianka in Ternopil, WFC Zhytlobud-1 Kharkiv and WFC Lehenda-ShVSM Chernihiv. She played in all three matches of the 2016–17 UEFA Women's Champions League qualifying round with WFC Zhytlobud-1 Kharkiv.

In 2018, she moved to Turkey, and joined newly promoted Turkish Women's First League team ALG Spor in Gaziantep.

In July 2019, Pantsulaia joined Spanish Primera División team Atlético Madrid.

In December 2019, she rescinded her contract with Atlético Madrid. In the second half of the 2019-20 Turkish Women's First League season, she returned to Turkey joining her previous club ALG Spor. On 10 September 2020, she left Turkey to return home. She joined Zhytlobud-2.

=== International ===
Pantsulaia was a member of the Ukraine women's national U-19 team. She made her debut at the 2010 UEFA Women's U-19 Championship First qualifying round – Group 10 match against Cyprus women's U-19 team on 19 September 2009.

She played in four of the 2019 FIFA Women's World Cup qualification – Group 4 matches with the Ukraine women's national team.

== Career statistics ==
As of match played 16 April 2021.

Club	Season	League			Continental		National		Total	
Club	Season	Division	Apps	Goals	Apps	Goals	Apps	Goals	Apps	Goals
Lehenda-ShVSM Chernihiv	2017–18	Ukrainian Women's League	11	1	–	–	0	0	11	1
ALG Spor	2018–19	First League	17	0	–	–	0	0	17	0
ALG Spor	2019–20	First League	4	4	–	–	0	0	4	4
ALG Spor	Total		32	5	–	–	0	0	32	5

== Honours ==
Lehenda-ShVSM Chernihiv

- Ukrainian Women's Cup

Runners-up 2017–18

Turkish Women's First League

ALG Spor
Champion (1): 2019–20
Runners-up (1): 2018–19
