= Dimitris =

Dimitris (Δημήτρης) is the Modern Greek form of the older forms Demetrios, Dimitrios (Δημήτριος, usually Latinized as Demetrius) and may refer to:

- Dimitris Arvanitis (born 1980), Greek professional football defender who plays for OFI in Greek Super League
- Dimitris Avramopoulos (born 1953), Greek politician and diplomat
- Dimitris Basis, Greek singer musician
- Dimitris Bogdanos (born 1975), Greek professional basketball player
- Dimitris Christofias, left-wing Greek Cypriot politician, President of the Republic of Cyprus
- Dimitris Diamantidis (born 1980), Greek professional basketball player
- Dimitris Dimakopoulos (born 1966), retired Greek professional basketball player
- Dimitris Dimitrakos (born 1936), Greek philosopher, currently Professor at the University of Athens
- Dimitris Dragatakis (1914–2001), Greek composer of classical music
- Dimitris Drosos (born 1966), Greek businessman, ex-chairman of AEK Athens BC, current chairman of PAOK BC
- Dimitris Giantsis (born 1988), Greek footballer
- Dimitris Giovanakis (born 1986), Greek football player
- Dimitris Glinos (1882–1943), Greek philosopher and politician
- Dimitris Horn (1921–1998), Greek theatrical and film performer
- Dimitris Karademitros, (born 1983), Greek footballer
- Dimitris Komesidis (born 1988), professional football defender
- Dimitris Kontopoulos (born 1971), Greek music composer known for his dance-pop music
- Dimitris Koutromanos (born 1987), Greek football player
- Dimitris Koutsoukis (born 1962), retired Greek shot putter
- Dimitris Kraniotis (born 1950), Greek dancer and poet who lives in France
- Dimitris Kremastinos (1942–2020), Greek politician, cardiologist and professor
- Dimitris Kyriakidis (born 1986), Greek footballer
- Dimitris Liantinis (born 1942), Greek deputy professor at University of Athens who disappeared
- Dimitris Lipertis (1866–1937), Cypriot poet
- Dimitris Lignadis, Greek actor, stage director and alleged sex offender
- Dimitris Lyacos (born 1966), contemporary Greek poet and playwright
- Dimitris Mardas (born 1955), Greek economist
- Dimitris Markos (born 1971), retired Greek football midfielder
- Dimitris Marmarinos (born 1976), Greek professional basketball player
- Dimitris Mavroeidis (born 1985), Greek professional basketball player
- Dimitris Mavrogenidis (born 1978), Uzbekistan-born Greek football right-back
- Dimitris Melissanidis (born 1946), Greek businessman and Oil tycoon
- Dimitris Mitropanos (born 1948), Greek singer in the Laïkó Greek music style
- Dimitris Mytaras (born 1934), Greek artist born in Chalkis
- Dimitris Nalitzis (born 1976), Greek footballer
- Dimitris Nikolaidis (1922–1993), Greek actor
- Dimitris Papaditsas (1922–1987), Greek poet
- Dimitris Papadopoulos (basketball player) (born 1966), retired Greek professional basketball player
- Dimitris Papaioannou (born 1964), Greek avant-garde stage director, choreographer and visual artist
- Dimitris Papamichael (1934–2004), famous Greek actor and director
- Dimitris Papanikolaou (born 1977), Greek professional basketball player
- Dimitris Papanikolau (born 1977), Greek professional basketball player
- Dimitris Petkakis (born 1983), football (soccer) player
- Dimitris Pikionis (1887–1968), major Greek architect
- Dimitris Plapoutas (1786–1865), Greek general who fought during the Greek War of Independence
- Dimitris Potiropoulos (born 1953), Greek architect
- Dimitris Poulianos (1899–1972), prodigious Greek artist
- Dimitris Poulikakos (born 1943), Greek actor and rock singer
- Dimitris Psathas, famous modern Greek satirist and playwright
- Dimitris Rizos (born 1976), Greek goalkeeper
- Dimitris Rontiris (1899–1981), Greek actor and director
- Dimitris Roussis (born 1988), professional football defender
- Dimitris Salpingidis (born 1981), Greek footballer
- Dimitris Samaras, Greek footballer
- Dimitris Sgouros (born 1969), Greek pianist
- Dimitris Sialmas (born 1986), Greek footballer
- Dimitris Sioufas (born 1944), Greek lawyer and New Democracy politician
- Dimitris Siovas (born 1988), Greek football player
- Dimitris Soudas (born 1979), Associate Communications Director and Spokesman to the Prime Minister of Canada
- Dimitris Soulas (born 1938), former Greek photojournalist
- Dimitris Spanoulis (born 1979), Greek professional basketball player
- Dimitris Spentzopoulos (born 1950), former Greek footballer (striker) born in Patras
- Dimitris Thanopoulos (born 1987), football midfielder currently without a team
- Dimitris Tsaldaris (born 1980), Greek professional basketball player
- Dimitris Tsaloumas (born 1921), contemporary Greek-Australian poet
- Dimitris Tsironis (born 1959), Greek footballer
- Dimitris Tsiodras (born 1959), Greek politician
- Dimitris Tsironis (politician) (1960–2022), Greek politician
- Dimitris Tsovolas, politician of Greece
- Dimitris Tziotis, the president and CEO of Cleverbank, a strategy consultancy in Greece
- Dimitris Varos (born 1949), modern Greek poet, journalist, and photographer
- Dimitris Verginis (born 1987), Greek professional basketball player
- Dimitris Voyatzis, Greek film director, actor, producer, editor, a screenwriter and a folk musician
- Dimitris Yeros (born 1948), one of the most influential Greek artists of his generation
- Dimitris Zouliotis (born 1984), Greek football player

== See also ==
- List of Dimitris Papaioannou comics
- List of Dimitris Papaioannou works
