= Dimitrije =

Dimitrije (Serbian Cyrillic: Димитрије) is a masculine given name. Dimitrije is a Serbian variant of a Greek name Demetrius. It may refer to:

- Dimitrije, Serbian Patriarch (1846–1930) of the Serbian Orthodox Church
- Dimitrije Avramović (1815–1855), Serbian painter
- Dimitrije Banjac (born 1976), Serbian actor and comedian
- Dimitrije Bašičević (1921–1987), Yugoslavian artist, curator and art critic
- Dimitrije Bjelica (1935–2025), Serbian (formerly Yugoslav) chess FIDE Master
- Dimitrije Bogdanović (1930–1986), Serbian historian
- Dimitrije Bratoglic (1765–1831), Serbian painter, merchant and sometime spy
- Dimitrije Dimitri Davidovic (born 1944), Belgian former football player and manager
- Dimitrije Davidović (1789–1838), secretary to Miloš Obrenović I, Prince of Serbia, Minister of Education of the Principality of Serbia, writer, journalist, publisher, historian, diplomatist, and founder of modern Serbian journalism and publishing
- Dimitrije Dimitrijević (disambiguation)
- Dimitrije Đorđević (historian) (1922–2009), Serbian historian
- Dimitrije Injac (born 1983), Serbian football midfielder
- Dimitrije T. Leko (1863–1914), Serbian architect and urbanist
- Dimitrije Ljotić (1891–1945), Serbian politician
- Dimitrije Ljubavić (1519–1564), Serbian Orthodox deacon, humanist, writer and printer
- Dimitrije Mitrinović (1887–1953), Serbian philosopher, poet, revolutionary, mystic, theoretician of modern painting and traveller
- Dimitrije Nemanjić (d. after 1286), Serbian prince from the Nemanjić dynasty
- Dimitrije Nešić (1836–1904), mathematician and president of the Serbian Royal Academy
- Dimitrije Dositej Obradović (1742–1811), Serbian writer, philosopher, dramatist, librettist, linguist, traveler, polyglot and first minister of education of Serbia
- Dimitrije Pejanović (born 1974), Serbian former handball player
- Dimitrije Popović (born 1951), Montenegrin and Croatian painter, sculptor, art critic and philosopher
- Dimitrije Ruvarac (1842–1931), Serbian historian, Orthodox priest, politician and publisher
- Dimitrije Stojaković, birth name of Döme Sztójay (1883–1946), Hungarian soldier and diplomat of Serbian origin
- Dimitrije Tucović (1881–1914), Serbian politician, theorist of the socialist movement and publisher

== See also ==
- Dimitrij, a given name
- Dimitri (disambiguation)
- Dmitry
- Dmytro
- Dimitrijević
- Mitar
