= List of National Rugby League referees =

The following is a list of rugby league referees who have appeared in Australian top-level rugby league, that is the NRL and its predecessors, the NSWRL, ARL and SL premierships.

Referees still currently active are listed in bold.

== Referees ==
NOTES:

- Referees are listed in the order of their debut game.
- Referees who debuted in the same day are listed in order alphabetically.
- The statistics in this table are correct as of round 16 of the 2024 NRL season.

#	Name	Premiership Career	Premiership Games	First Premiership Match	Representative Games	Internationals	Grand Finals
1	George Boss	1908	3	South Sydney v North Sydney (20 April 1908)	0	0	0
2	Tom Costello	1908	5	Glebe v Newcastle (20 April 1908)	0	2	0
3	Edward Hooper	1908–09	17	Eastern Suburbs v Newtown (20 April 1908)	0	0	0
4	George Seabrook	1908–11	25	Balmain v Western Suburbs (20 April 1908)	0	0	0
5	Fred Henlen	1908	4	Balmain v North Sydney (25 April 1908)	1	0	0
6	Charlie Hutchison	1908–09	15	Newcastle v Cumberland (16 May 1908)	0	2	1
7	Arthur Welch	1908–11	6	Western Suburbs v Newcastle (23 May 1908)	0	0	0
8	Tom McMahon Sr.	1908–26	220	Balmain v South Sydney (25 July 1908)	12	10	3
9	M McDermott	1908	1	Glebe v Balmain (8 August 1908)	0	0	0
10	Bill Finegan	1909–12, 1919–20	26	Newcastle v North Sydney (24 April 1909)	1	0	1
11	H Poulton	1909–10	14	Western Suburbs v North Sydney (29 May 1909)	0	0	0
12	A Ballerum	1909–15	33	South Sydney v Eastern Suburbs (10 July 1909)	0	0	0
13	Arthur Farrow	1909–21	115	Balmain v Glebe (7 August 1909)	1	0	1
14	Lance Hansen	1910–11, 1913, 1915	4	Glebe v Annandale (21 May 1910)	0	0	0
15	Laurie Kearney	1910–13	37	Annandale v Glebe (30 July 1910)	3	1	0
16	E Shaw	1910–14	20	Glebe v North Sydney (20 August 1910)	0	0	0
17	A Norton	1911–13	4	Annandale v North Sydney (29 July 1911)	0	0	0
18	Edward Larkin	1912	1	Eastern Suburbs v Western Suburbs (11 May 1912)	0	0	0
19	Charles Hedley	1912–15, 1918–20	37	Newtown v Western Suburbs (6 July 1912)	0	0	0
20	Horrie Millington	1913, 1915–16, 1918, 1921–22	14	Western Suburbs v Annandale (14 June 1913)	0	0	0
21	Tom Dickenson	1913–17, 1919–20	55	Newtown v Annandale (28 June 1913)	0	0	0
22	A Bolton	1913	2	South Sydney v Annandale (12 July 1913)	0	0	0
23	S Brown	1913–15	3	Annandale v Newtown (16 August 1913)	0	0	0
24	T McIntosh	1913	1	Balmain v Western Suburbs (16 August 1913)	0	0	0
25	Joe Black	1914–19	38	Western Suburbs v Annandale (30 May 1914)	1	0	0
26	G Boyd	1915	1	Newtown v Western Suburbs (22 May 1915)	0	0	0
27	W Iredale	1915	2	Western Suburbs v Eastern Suburbs (12 June 1915)	0	0	0
28	T Phelan	1915	1	North Sydney v Western Suburbs (3 July 1915)	0	0	0
29	Arthur Thornton	1915, 1917, 1919–26	54	Western Suburbs v South Sydney (31 July 1915)	0	0	0
30	J Buchanan	1915	1	North Sydney v Balmain (14 August 1915)	0	0	0
31	Charlie Russell	1916–18, 1920	45	Western Suburbs v Balmain (13 May 1916)	0	0	0
32	Larry O'Malley	1916, 1919–21	15	Western Suburbs v Annandale (1 July 1916)	0	0	0
33	William Neill	1916–32	192	Western Suburbs v Newtown (15 July 1916)	12	1	3
34	E Norman	1919	1	Newtown v South Sydney (16 August 1919)	0	0	0
35	Frank Delaney	1920, 1922, 1924–26, 1929	17	Eastern Suburbs v Sydney University (15 May 1920)	0	0	0
36	O Harding	1921	2	South Sydney v Sydney University (14 May 1921)	0	0	0
37	Vic Dickenson	1921–22	15	Glebe v St George (23 April 1921)	0	0	0
38	Joe Murray	1921–31	77	Newtown v Sydney University (25 June 1921)	0	0	0
39	C Shirley	1922–23, 1925	3	Balmain v Sydney University (29 July 1922)	0	0	0
40	S Jackson	1922–26	31	South Sydney v Sydney University (2 September 1922)	0	0	0
41	Mick Brannaghan	1926–28	16	Balmain v North Sydney (1 May 1926)	0	0	0
42	Ted Kerr	1926–29	30	Western Suburbs v Balmain (12 June 1926)	0	0	0
43	Lal Deane	1927–37	159	Balmain v Glebe (23 April 1927)	21	5	6
44	J Miller	1927–30	34	Eastern Suburbs v Sydney University (30 April 1927)	0	0	0
45	Baden Wales Snr	1927–30	27	Balmain v Sydney University (7 May 1927)	0	0	0
46	W Long	1927	2	St George v North Sydney (21 May 1927)	0	0	0
47	H Mills	1927	2	Western Suburbs v St George (11 June 1927)	0	0	0
48	Reg Drake	1927	4	North Sydney v Sydney University (16 July 1927)	0	0	0
49	W Wall	1927	1	Western Suburbs v Newtown (23 July 1927)	0	0	0
50	Eric Buckley	1928, 1930	3	St George v Sydney University (28 July 1928)	0	0	0
51	Bill Fry	1929–34	56	Balmain v Glebe (20 July 1929)	2	0	1
52	S Jolly	1929	2	North Sydney v Sydney University (3 August 1929)	0	0	0
53	G Robinson	1929	4	St George v Glebe (10 August 1929)	0	0	0
54	E Fletcher	1930, 1932	4	St George v Sydney University (16 August 1930)	0	0	0
55	Chris McGrath	1931–33	29	Eastern Suburbs v Sydney University (25 April 1931)	1	0	0
56	A Christie	1931–32, 1934	16	Western Suburbs v Sydney University (16 May 1931)	2	0	0
57	A Lupton	1931	6	North Sydney v Newtown (16 May 1931)	0	0	0
58	C Jackson	1931–32	4	North Sydney v Balmain (1 August 1931)	0	0	0
59	Leo Baggott	1932–35, 1938	15	St George v Sydney University (25 April 1932)	0	0	0
60	H Irvine	1932–34	9	South Sydney v Sydney University (11 June 1932)	0	0	0
61	George Clamback	1932	5	North Sydney v Sydney University (25 June 1932)	0	0	0
62	B Maloney	1932	2	North Sydney v Newtown (20 August 1932)	0	0	0
63	Tom McMahon Jr.	1933–41, 1944–51	250	Western Suburbs v Sydney University (25 April 1933)	26	7	5
64	C Brown	1933	2	St George v North Sydney (8 July 1933)	0	0	0
65	J Murphy	1934–36	16	Newtown v Sydney University (19 May 1934)	0	0	1
66	C York	1934	3	St George v Sydney University (16 June 1934)	0	0	0
67	P Lee	1934–41	53	Western Suburbs v Sydney University (7 July 1934)	0	0	0
68	Jack Latta	1935–36	14	Newtown v Canterbury-Bankstown (6 May 1935)	0	0	0
69	Arthur Davis	1935–39	33	Eastern Suburbs v Canterbury-Bankstown (18 May 1935)	0	0	0
70	Alex Spankie	1936–38, 1940	33	Balmain v Western Suburbs (25 April 1936)	0	0	0
71	R Ward	1936	1	Balmain v Sydney University (2 May 1936)	0	0	0
72	S Heycox	1937	1	St George v Sydney University (22 May 1937)	0	0	0
73	Joe McGauley	1937–42	55	Canterbury-Bankstown v Sydney University (19 June 1937)	0	0	0
74	W Cole	1938–39	2	Balmain v North Sydney (25 April 1938)	0	0	0
75	Richard Lewis	1938	2	Canterbury-Bankstown v North Sydney (18 June 1938)	1	0	0
76	R Musgrave	1938	4	Eastern Suburbs v North Sydney (25 June 1938)	0	0	0
77	J Mercer	1938	1	St George v Newtown (23 July 1938)	0	0	0
78	George Bishop	1938–41, 1943–52	211	Newtown v South Sydney (6 August 1938)	6	4	5
79	J Bates	1939	4	South Sydney v Newtown (1 July 1939)	0	0	0
80	Bill Devine	1940–43, 1956	7	South Sydney v Western Suburbs (22 June 1940)	0	1	0
81	Jack O'Brien	1940–55	261	Western Suburbs v Newtown (29 June 1940)	10	0	7
82	Bill Cuke	1941–42	7	North Sydney v Newtown (12 July 1941)	0	0	0
83	Austin Shiner	1941–48, 1950–55	90	Western Suburbs v North Sydney (2 August 1941)	0	0	0
84	H Carrick	1942–43	6	Newtown v Western Suburbs (30 May 1942)	0	0	0
85	Jack Kelly	1942, 1947–48	10	South Sydney v Western Suburbs (27 June 1942)	0	0	0
86	Aub Oxford	1942–54	135	Eastern Suburbs v Western Suburbs (1 August 1942)	5	0	0
87	Ray Smyth	1943–48	33	Western Suburbs v Canterbury-Bankstown (3 July 1943)	0	0	0
88	Darcy Lawler	1944–45, 1948–63	272	Eastern Suburbs v North Sydney (13 May 1944)	12	19	8
89	A Davis	1947	7	Balmain v South Sydney (3 May 1947)	0	0	0
90	G Hallwood	1947	4	Canterbury-Bankstown v Parramatta (10 May 1947)	0	0	0
91	Cliff Brown	1947–50, 1952–62	172	Parramatta v South Sydney (5 July 1947)	4	0	0
92	Col Pearce	1947–50, 1952–68	343	Parramatta v Manly-Warringah (9 August 1947)	15	12	6
93	Les Williams	1951–54, 1956–57	39	North Sydney v Newtown (30 June 1951)	0	0	0
94	Bert Cowley	1953	4	Parramatta v North Sydney (25 April 1953)	0	0	0
95	A Konnecke	1954	3	Balmain v St George (10 April 1954)	0	0	0
96	Fred Erickson	1955–64	112	Canterbury-Bankstown v Eastern Suburbs (15 May 1955)	4	0	0
97	Ray O'Donnell	1955–56, 1958–59	31	Newtown v Canterbury-Bankstown (29 May 1955)	0	0	0
98	R McMillan	1956	4	South Sydney v Eastern Suburbs (14 April 1956)	0	0	0
99	Keith Parkinson	1956–59, 1961–63	48	Canterbury-Bankstown v South Sydney (28 April 1956)	0	0	0
100	Bob Cummins	1956	2	Balmain v North Sydney (1 July 1956)	0	0	0
101	Kevin Keough	1956	4	North Sydney v Parramatta (21 July 1956)	0	0	0
102	Baden Wales Jnr	1957–59	19	Parramatta v Manly-Warringah (25 April 1957)	0	0	0
103	Dudley Nicholson	1957–59	17	Canterbury-Bankstown v Eastern Suburbs (6 July 1957)	0	0	0
104	Don Lancashire	1959, 1970	27	Canterbury-Bankstown v Manly-Warringah (30 May 1959)	12	6	1
105	Les Samuelson	1959–61, 1965–71	124	Parramatta v South Sydney (20 June 1959)	4	0	0
106	Frank Walsh	1959	3	Canterbury-Bankstown v Eastern Suburbs (20 June 1959)	0	0	0
107	Bill Kelly	1960–62, 1965–66	28	Newtown v Parramatta (25 June 1960)	0	0	0
108	Cyril Dimon	1961–62	9	Manly-Warringah v South Sydney (22 April 1961)	0	0	0
109	Laurie Bruyeres	1961–68, 1970–75	239	Newtown v North Sydney (6 May 1961)	3	3	2
110	Arthur Neville	1962–63, 1965, 1968–70	52	North Sydney v Eastern Suburbs (21 July 1962)	1	0	0
111	Jack Bradley	1962–64, 1966–68	78	South Sydney v Manly-Warringah (22 July 1962)	1	6	1
112	G Lane	1963–64	4	North Sydney v Balmain (19 May 1963)	0	0	0
113	George Kellahan	1964	2	Parramatta v Canterbury-Bankstown (4 April 1964)	0	0	0
114	Jack Harris	1964–65, 1970–71	47	Balmain v Western Suburbs (5 April 1964)	0	0	0
115	Ted Pepper	1964	2	Eastern Suburbs v South Sydney (5 April 1964)	0	0	0
116	J Jacobson	1964	4	Western Suburbs v Eastern Suburbs (18 April 1964)	0	0	0
117	Albert Perry	1964	3	Manly-Warringah v Western Suburbs (27 June 1964)	0	0	0
118	T Cook	1965, 1969	26	Canterbury-Bankstown v South Sydney (3 April 1965)	0	0	0
119	Keith Holman	1965–74	153	Newtown v Manly-Warringah (12 June 1965)	5	2	1
120	Jack Farrelly	1966, 1968–71	33	Eastern Suburbs v South Sydney (8 May 1966)	0	0	0
121	Carl Langton	1966–67	22	Eastern Suburbs v North Sydney (24 July 1966)	1	0	0
122	Keith Page	1967–76	207	Eastern Suburbs v Cronulla-Sutherland (2 April 1967)	6	3	3
123	Phil Elliss	1967	5	South Sydney v Cronulla-Sutherland (15 April 1967)	0	0	0
124	Don MacDonald	1967–69, 1971–79	155	Cronulla-Sutherland v Penrith (4 June 1967)	1	0	0
125	Brian Barry	1967–68	16	Cronulla-Sutherland v South Sydney (25 June 1967)	0	0	0
126	Phil McCarroll	1969–71	29	Cronulla-Sutherland v North Sydney (30 March 1969)	0	0	0
127	Richie Humphreys	1969–78	99	North Sydney v Cronulla-Sutherland (15 June 1969)	1	0	0
128	Clive Edwards	1970–73, 1975	30	Cronulla-Sutherland v Parramatta (7 June 1970)	0	0	0
129	Gary Cook	1971–79	153	Penrith v Eastern Suburbs (30 May 1971)	2	1	2
130	Gary Bennett	1971–72, 1974	19	Cronulla-Sutherland v Penrith (3 April 1971)	0	0	0
131	Barry Barnes	1972–73, 1982–87	142	South Sydney v Parramatta (25 March 1972)	0	1	0
132	Greg Hartley	1972–81	174	Penrith v St George (2 July 1972)	4	5	5
133	Barry Cross	1973	7	Penrith v Parramatta (6 May 1973)	0	0	0
134	Jack Danzey	1973–83	172	Western Suburbs v Manly-Warringah (20 May 1973)	4	0	0
135	Mick Naughton	1973, 1979	2	St George v Cronulla-Sutherland (14 July 1973)	2	6	0
136	Dennis Braybrook	1975–82	76	Manly-Warringah v Eastern Suburbs (23 March 1975)	0	0	0
137	Kevin Roberts	1975–88	274	Balmain v St George (25 April 1975)	10	6	3
138	Francois Escande	1975	1	Balmain v Eastern Suburbs (15 June 1975)	0	5	0
139	Neil McAlister	1975	3	Balmain v North Sydney (29 June 1975)	0	0	0
140	Col Turnell	1976	6	Newtown v Eastern Suburbs (4 April 1976)	0	0	0
141	Barry Bradstock	1976–81	46	Eastern Suburbs v North Sydney (30 May 1976)	0	0	0
142	John Gocher	1976–86	177	Cronulla-Sutherland v Newtown (25 July 1976)	2	4	1
143	Doug Wintin	1977–78	5	Newtown v St George (8 May 1977)	0	0	0
144	Billy Thompson	1977	1	Manly-Warringah v Western Suburbs (12 June 1977)	1	17	0
145	George Brain	1977	3	Parramatta v Newtown (19 June 1977)	0	0	0
146	Marcel Caillol	1977	1	South Sydney v North Sydney (26 June 1977)	0	5	0
147	Bruce Shipton	1978–79	2	St George v Canterbury-Bankstown (12 August 1978)	0	0	0
148	Barry Goldsworthy	1979–82	43	Newtown v Eastern Suburbs (6 May 1979)	0	0	0
149	Chris Ward	1979–91	129	Cronulla-Sutherland v Penrith (26 August 1979)	1	0	0
150	Colin Ward	1980, 1984	7	North Sydney v Western Suburbs (13 April 1980)	0	0	0
151	Martin Weekes	1980–85	72	Penrith v North Sydney (8 June 1980)	0	0	0
152	Ian Smith	1980	2	Newtown v Penrith (10 August 1980)	0	3	0
153	Peter Pierse	1981	2	Balmain v North Sydney (10 May 1981)	0	0	0
154	Mick Stone	1981–89	192	Canterbury-Bankstown v South Sydney (16 August 1981)	6	4	3
155	Barrie Keenahan	1982	1	Newtown v North Sydney (19 March 1982)	0	0	0
156	Graham Annesley	1982–95, 1997	244	St George v Canberra (28 March 1982)	3	6	0
157	Steve Nash	1982, 1984	4	Newtown v Parramatta (25 April 1982)	0	0	0
158	Giles O'Donnell	1982–87	39	Newtown v Canberra (25 July 1982)	0	0	0
159	Julien Rascagneres	1983	1	Illawarra v Manly-Warringah (5 March 1983)	0	9	0
160	Lionel Green	1983	8	Illawarra v Newtown (3 April 1983)	0	0	0
161	Graeme West	1983–86, 1988–96	181	Western Suburbs v South Sydney (17 April 1983)	0	0	0
162	Greg McCallum	1983–94	241	Western Suburbs v Cronulla-Sutherland (7 August 1983)	7	13	3
163	Allan McKean	1984	2	Western Suburbs v Eastern Suburbs (22 July 1984)	0	0	0
164	Denis Spagarino	1984–88	22	Canberra v Illawarra (22 July 1984)	0	0	0
165	Noel Bissett	1984	1	Cronulla-Sutherland v South Sydney (12 August 1984)	0	0	0
166	Robin Whitfield	1985–86	5	Canterbury v Eastern Suburbs (1 July 1985)	1	11	0
167	Bill Harrigan	1986–95, 1997–2003	393	Western Suburbs v Cronulla-Sutherland (18 May 1986)	27	26	10
168	Phil Cooley	1986, 1988–89	30	Cronulla-Sutherland v Eastern Suburbs (8 June 1986)	0	0	0
169	Greg Boyd	1986	6	Cronulla-Sutherland v Canberra (29 June 1986)	0	0	0
170	Peter Filmer	1987–89, 1991–92	30	Balmain v Western Suburbs (17 May 1987)	0	0	0
171	David O'Keefe	1987	6	Penrith v Illawarra (26 July 1987)	0	0	0
172	Eddie Ward	1988–98	217	Gold Coast v Canterbury-Bankstown (5 March 1988)	12	11	1
173	Neil Almond	1988–91, 1995–96	82	Cronulla-Sutherland v Eastern Suburbs (27 March 1988)	0	0	0
174	Brian Grant	1988–89, 1991, 1997–99	99	Parramatta v St George (8 May 1988)	0	0	0
175	Tony Kelly	1988–91, 1993, 1995–96	67	North Sydney v Western Suburbs (31 July 1988)	0	0	0
176	Geoff Weeks	1990–91	32	Parramatta v Penrith (18 March 1990)	0	0	0
177	Ian Parnaby	1990–93, 1996	48	St George v Gold Coast (15 April 1990)	0	0	0
178	David Goener	1990	7	Parramatta v Gold Coast (8 July 1990)	0	0	0
179	Kelvin Jeffes	1991–98, 2000	120	Newcastle v South Sydney (4 August 1991)	1	2	0
180	Tim Mander	1992–95, 1997–2005	292	Newcastle v Gold Coast (19 April 1992)	2	14	2
181	David Manson	1992–97	133	North Sydney v Eastern Suburbs (19 April 1992)	11	3	2
182	Steve Clark	1992–95, 1997–2007	313	Parramatta v Newcastle (31 May 1992)	7	8	0
183	Mick Lewis	1994–96	47	Canberra v South Sydney (18 March 1994)	0	0	0
184	Paul McBlane	1994–99	97	Parramatta v South Sydney (8 May 1994)	1	0	0
185	David Jay	1994–95	14	Parramatta v Gold Coast (7 August 1994)	0	0	0
186	Mark Oaten	1995–2002	111	Illawarra v Gold Coast (9 April 1995)	0	0	0
187	Tony Maksoud	1995–97	20	South Sydney v Penrith (20 May 1995)	0	0	0
188	Bob Flint	1995	1	Canberra v Parramatta (11 June 1995)	0	0	0
189	Phil Houston	1995–97	5	North Queensland v Sydney Tigers (24 June 1995)	0	5	0
190	Rob Alexander	1995–96	18	Parramatta v Manly-Warringah (9 July 1995)	0	0	0
191	Matt Hewitt	1996–2000	76	Gold Coast v Manly-Warringah (14 April 1996)	0	0	0
192	Paul Simpkins	1996–2007	283	Canberra v North Queensland (14 April 1996)	6	5	1
193	Sean Hampstead	1996–2008	289	Cronulla-Sutherland v South Queensland (15 June 1996)	3	2	0
194	Moghseen Jadwat	1997–2000	53	South Sydney v Illawarra (25 May 1997)	0	0	0
195	Steve Chiddy	1998	12	Balmain v Gold Coast (14 March 1998)	0	0	0
196	Rod Lawrence	1998–99, 2003	9	Sydney City v Adelaide (17 April 1998)	0	0	0
197	Tony Archer	1999–2012	294	Western Suburbs v Canterbury-Bankstown (24 July 1999)	14	9	6
198	Stephen Richards	2001–02	9	Parramatta v Sharks (24 February 2001)	0	0	0
199	Shayne Hayne	2001–14	329	Brisbane v Wests (10 March 2001)	17	10	4
200	Steve Carrall	2001	2	Sydney v North Queensland (16 June 2001)	0	0	0
201	Matt Cecchin	2001–04, 2008–21	371	Wests v North Queensland (14 July 2001)	6	13	3
202	Steve Lyons	2001–05, 2008–12	164	Canberra v Penrith (11 August 2001)	0	0	0
203	Jason Robinson	2003–13	209	Wests v South Sydney (9 August 2003)	2	4	0
204	Gavin Badger	2003–20	354	South Sydney v Cronulla-Sutherland (30 August 2003)	4	2	0
205	Russell Smith	2005–06	38	Wests v Parramatta (12 March 2005)	0	28	0
206	Tony De Las Heras	2006–12	105	Newcastle v North Queensland (16 April 2006)	0	1	0
207	Ben Cummins	2006–23	444	North Queensland v Penrith (6 May 2006)	16	16	5
208	Jared Maxwell	2006–16	271	Penrith v South Sydney (14 May 2006)	3	2	0
209	Bernard Sutton	2007–10, 2012–13, 2015–18	43	Canberra v Cronulla-Sutherland (1 September 2007)	1	0	0
210	Phil Haines	2008–14	79	St George Illawarra v Melbourne (17 May 2008)	1	1	0
211	Alan Shortall	2008–18	240	North Queensland v Penrith (31 May 2008)	4	0	0
212	**Ashley Klein**	2009–present	388	New Zealand v Parramatta (14 March 2009)	21	37	2
213	Brett Suttor	2009–14	107	Canterbury-Bankstown v Manly-Warringah (14 March 2009)	2	0	0
214	Chris James	2009–17	183	Gold Coast v Newcastle (15 March 2009)	1	2	0
215	**Gerard Sutton**	2009–present	383	Wests Tigers v Canberra (16 March 2009)	28	28	7
216	Adam Devcich	2009–16	131	New Zealand v Canberra (23 August 2009)	3	0	0
217	Luke Phillips	2010–11, 2013–14	27	Melbourne v Cronulla-Sutherland (21 August 2010)	0	0	0
218	Gavin Reynolds	2010–18	147	North Queensland v Canterbury-Bankstown (21 August 2010)	1	0	0
219	Gavin Morris	2010–15	98	Melbourne v Newcastle (5 September 2010)	1	0	0
220	Michael Wise	2011	1	North Queensland v New Zealand (18 June 2011)	0	0	0
221	Henry Perenara	2011–21	205	Sydney v Canberra (4 July 2011)	0	9	0
222	David Munro	2011–20	117	Cronulla-Sutherland v Gold Coast (6 August 2011)	1	0	0
223	**Adam Gee**	2011–present	250	Sydney v Cronulla-Sutherland (20 August 2011)	9	3	1
224	**Grant Atkins**	2011–present	251	Parramatta v Sydney (26 August 2011)	9	8	0
225	**Chris Sutton**	2012, 2014–present	187	South Sydney v Sydney (5 March 2012)	1	0	0
226	**Chris Butler**	2014–present	145	Melbourne v Canberra (19 July 2014)	1	0	0
227	**Matt Noyen**	2015–21	70	North Queensland v Newcastle (14 March 2015)	0	0	0
228	**Peter Gough**	2016–present	138	Canberra v Cronulla-Sutherland (17 April 2016)	3	2	0
229	Tim Alouani-Roby	2016–19	22	Sydney v St George Illawarra (21 August 2016)	0	2	0
230	**Jon Stone**	2016–20	69	Newcastle v South Sydney (28 August 2016)	0	0	0
231	**Zbignew Przeklasa-Adamski**	2017–present	68	Newcastle v St George Illawarra (29 July 2017)	0	0	0
232	Phil Henderson	2018–20	40	New Zealand v North Queensland (7 April 2018)	0	0	0
233	**Liam Kennedy**	2018–19, 2022–present	36	Canberra v North Queensland (14 July 2018)	0	0	0
234	Adam Cassidy	2019	9	Wests v Manly-Warringah (16 March 2019)	0	0	0
235	**Todd Smith**	2019, 2022–present	55	St George Illawarra v Canberra (14 July 2019)	0	0	0
236	**Belinda Sharpe**	2019–present	15	Brisbane v Canterbury-Bankstown (18 July 2019)	0	0	0
237	**Kasey Badger**	2023–present	4	Gold Coast v Canterbury-Bankstown (3 September 2023)	0	2	0
238	**Wyatt Raymond**	2024–present	5	Melbourne v Canterbury-Bankstown (12 April 2024)	0	0	0

=== Grand Final Referees ===
Referee	Games	Years
Bill Harrigan	10	1989 (Canberra v Balmain) 1990 (Canberra v Penrith) 1991 (Penrith v Canberra) 1997 (Brisbane v Cronulla-Sutherland) 1998 (Brisbane v Canterbury-Bankstown) 1999 (Melbourne v St George) 2000 (Brisbane v Sydney) 2001 (Newcastle v Parramatta) 2002 (Sydney v New Zealand) 2003 (Penrith v Sydney)
Darcy Lawler	8	1953 (South Sydney v St George) 1956 (St George v Balmain) 1957 (St George v Manly-Warringah) 1958 (St George v Western Suburbs) 1959 (St George v Manly-Warringah) 1960 (St George v Eastern Suburbs) 1961 (St George v Western Suburbs) 1963 (St George v Western Suburbs)
Jack O'Brien	7	1940 (Eastern Suburbs v Canterbury-Bankstown) 1942 (Canterbury-Bankstown v St George) 1943 (Newtown v North Sydney) 1944 (Balmain v Newtown) 1947 (Balmain v Canterbury-Bankstown) 1951 (South Sydney v Manly-Warringah) 1954 (South Sydney v Newtown)
Gerard Sutton	7	2014 (South Sydney v Canterbury-Bankstown) 2015 (North Queensland v Brisbane) 2017 (Melbourne v North Queensland) 2018 (Sydney v Melbourne) 2019 (Sydney v Canberra) 2020 (Penrith v Melbourne) 2021 (Penrith v South Sydney)
Lal Deane	6	1928 (South Sydney v Eastern Suburbs) 1929 (South Sydney v Newtown) 1930 (Western Suburbs v St George) 1931 (South Sydney v Eastern Suburbs) 1932 (South Sydney v Western Suburbs) 1936 (Eastern Suburbs v Balmain)
Col Pearce	6	1955 (South Sydney v Newtown) 1964 (St George v Balmain) 1965 (St George v South Sydney) 1966 (St George v Balmain) 1967 (South Sydney v Canterbury-Bankstown) 1968 (South Sydney v Manly-Warringah)
Tony Archer	6	2007 (Melbourne v Manly-Warringah) 2008 (Manly-Warringah v Melbourne) 2009 (Melbourne v Parramatta) 2010 (St George Illawarra v Sydney) 2011 (Manly-Warringah v New Zealand) 2012 (Melbourne v Canterbury-Bankstown)
George Bishop	5	1939 (Balmain v South Sydney) 1946 (Balmain v St George) 1948 (Western Suburbs v Balmain) 1949 (St George v South Sydney) 1952 (Western Suburbs v South Sydney)
Tom McMahon Jr.	5	1935 (Eastern Suburbs v South Sydney) 1938 (Canterbury-Bankstown v Eastern Suburbs) 1941 (St George v Eastern Suburbs) 1945 (Eastern Suburbs v Balmain) 1950 (South Sydney v Western Suburbs)
Ben Cummins	5	2012 (Melbourne v Canterbury-Bankstown) 2013 (Sydney v Manly-Warringah) 2015 (North Queensland v Brisbane) 2016 (Cronulla-Sutherland v Melbourne) 2019 (Sydney v Canberra)
Greg Hartley	4	1978 (Manly-Warringah v Cronulla-Sutherland) 1979 (St George v Canterbury-Bankstown) 1980 (Canterbury-Bankstown v Eastern Suburbs) 1981 (Parramatta v Newtown)
Shayne Hayne	4	2009 (Melbourne v Parramatta) 2010 (St George Illawarra v Sydney) 2013 (Sydney v Manly-Warringah) 2014 (South Sydney v Canterbury-Bankstown)
Tom McMahon Sr.	3	1911 (Eastern Suburbs v Glebe) 1922 (North Sydney v Glebe) 1923 (Eastern Suburbs v South Sydney)
William Neill	3	1924 (Balmain v South Sydney) 1926 (South Sydney v Sydney University) 1927 (South Sydney v St George)
Keith Page	3	1969 (Balmain v South Sydney) 1972 (Manly-Warringah v Eastern Suburbs) 1973 (Manly-Warringah v Cronulla-Sutherland)
Kevin Roberts	3	1983 (Parramatta v Manly-Warringah) 1984 (Canterbury-Bankstown v Parramatta) 1985 (Canterbury-Bankstown v St George)
Mick Stone	3	1986 (Parramatta v Canterbury-Bankstown) 1987 (Manly-Warringah v Canberra) 1988 (Canterbury-Bankstown v Balmain)
Greg McCallum	3	1992 (Brisbane v St George) 1993 (Brisbane v St George) 1994 (Canberra v Canterbury-Bankstown)
Matt Cecchin	3	2011 (Manly-Warringah v New Zealand) 2016 (Cronulla-Sutherland v Melbourne) 2017 (Melbourne v North Queensland)
Laurie Bruyeres	2	1974 (Eastern Suburbs v Canterbury-Bankstown) 1975 (Eastern Suburbs v St George)
Gary Cook	2	1976 (Manly-Warringah v Parramatta) 1977 (St George v Parramatta)
David Manson	2	1996 (Manly-Warringah v St George) 1997 (Newcastle v Manly-Warringah)
Tim Mander	2	2004 (Bulldogs v Sydney) 2005 (Wests v North Queensland)
Ashley Klein	2	2018 (Sydney v Melbourne) 2022 (Penrith v Parramatta)
Charlie Hutchison	1	1908 (South Sydney v Eastern Suburbs)
Bill Finegan	1	1910 (Newtown v South Sydney)
Arthur Farrow	1	1916 (Balmain v South Sydney)
Bill Fry	1	1933 (Newtown v St George)
J. Murphy	1	1934 (Western Suburbs v Eastern Suburbs)
Jack Bradley	1	1962 (St George v Western Suburbs)
Don Lancashire	1	1970 (South Sydney v Manly-Warringah)
Keith Holman	1	1971 (South Sydney v St George)
John Gocher	1	1982 (Parramatta v Manly-Warringah)
Eddie Ward	1	1995 (Sydney Bulldogs v Manly-Warringah)
Paul Simpkins	1	2006 (Brisbane v Melbourne)
Adam Gee	1	2023 (Penrith v Brisbane)

== See also ==
- NRL match officials
