= Dimi =

Dimi may refer to:

- Dymi, Achaea, a municipal unit in Achaea, Greece
- Dimi, a type of Georgian wine
- Dimi, short for the given names Dimitri (disambiguation), Dimitrios or Dimitra (disambiguation)
- Dimi (metric prefix), obsolete non-SI metric prefix for 10^{−4} (symbol is dm)
- DIMI (music synthesizer) an early music synthesizer created by Erkki Kurenniemi
