= Dimitrijević =

Dimitrijević (Cyrillic script: Димитријевић) is a Serbian patronymic surname derived from a masculine given name Dimitrije. It may refer to:

- Bojan Dimitrijević (actor) (born 1973), Serbian actor
- Bojan Dimitrijević (politician) (born 1963), Serbian Minister of Trade, Tourism, and Services (2004–2007)
- Braco Dimitrijević (born 1948), Bosnian artist, born in Sarajevo, Bosnia
- Dimitrije Dimitrijević, former Bosnian football player who played between the two world wars
- Dragutin Dimitrijević (1876–1917), Serbian soldier and nationalist leader of the Black Hand group
- Jelena Dimitrijević (born 1862), Serbian woman writer
- Miloš Dimitrijević (born 1984), Serbian soccer player
- Nestor Dimitrijević (1782–1856), Serbian merchant and philanthropist
- Vojin Dimitrijević (1932–2012), Serbian human rights activist
- Zoran Dimitrijević (born 1962), Serbian midfielder
- Zorica Dimitrijević-Stošić, Serbian pianist and accompanist, former professor of piano at the Faculty of Music in Belgrade
