= Dimon (surname) =

- Charles A. R. Dimon (1841–1902), volunteer soldier in the Union Army during the American Civil War
- HelenKay Dimon, American writer
- John Dimon (1795–1879), a founder of Smith and Dimon Shipyard, United States
- Jamie Dimon (born 1956), American banker and businessman
- John E. Dimon (1916–1993), American Republican Party politician
- Cyril Dimon (died 2005), Australian rugby league referee

== See also ==
- Diamond (surname)
- Dimont (surname)
