= Dimitrij =

Dimitrij is a masculine given name related to Demetrius.

Bearers of the name include:

- Dimitrij Kotschnew (born 1981), Kazakhstani-born German former ice hockey goaltender
- Dimitrij Nonin (born 1979), German gymnast
- Dimitrij Rupel (born 1946), Slovenian politician

== See also ==
- Dimitrije, another masculine given name
