= Prince Dmitri =

Prince Dmitri may refer to:

- Dmitry Donskoy (1350–1389), Prince of Moscow
- Prince Dmitri Alexandrovich of Russia (1901–1980), nephew of Tsar Nicholas II of Russia

== See also ==
- Prince Dimitri Romanov (1926-2016), Russian prince, philanthropist and author.
- Dimitri (disambiguation)
