= Dhimitër =

Dhimitër is an Albanian name, derived from the Greek name Δημήτριος (Dimitrios). It may refer to:

- Dhimitër Progoni (fl. 1208–1216), Albanian ruler
- Dhimitër Jonima (fl. 1409), Albanian nobleman
- Dhimitër Frëngu (1443–1525), Albanian scholar, soldier and Catholic priest
- Dhimitër Tutulani (1857–1937), Albanian politician
- Dhimitër Kacimbra (1875–1950), Albanian lawyer and politician
- Dhimitër Berati (1886–1970), Albanian politician and journalist
- Dhimitër Çani (1904–1990), Albanian sculptor
- Dhimitër Pasko (1907–1967), Albanian writer
- Dhimitër Stamo (1931–2006), Albanian diplomat
- Dhimitër Xhuvani (1934–2009), Albanian writer and screenwriter
- Dhimitër Anagnosti (1936–2025), Albanian film director, screenwriter, cinematographer, and politician
- Dhimitër Orgocka (1936–2021), Albanian film director and theatre actor and director
- Dhimitër Zografi (1878–1945), one of the Albanian Independence Declaration signatories
- Dhimitër Mborja (fl. 1878), one of the Albanian Independence Declaration signatories
- Dhimitër Ilo (fl. 1878), one of the Albanian Independence Declaration signatories
- Dhimitër Shuteriqi (1915–2003), Albanian writer, historian and critic
- Dhimitër Dimroçi (1935–2013), Albanian footballer
- Dhimitër Kamarda, Arbëreshë (Italo-Albanian) linguist
