= Voloshin =

Voloshin, Woloshin, Wolloshin, Voloshyn or Woloshyn (Cyrillic: Волошин) is a Ukrainian and Russian masculine surname. Its feminine forms are Voloshina, Woloshina, Voloshyna or Woloshyna.

== People ==
=== Voloshin, Voloshina ===
- Asya Voloshina, Russian playwright
- Aleksandr Voloshin (born 1956), Russian politician and businessman
- Leonid Voloshin (born 1966), Russian triple jumper
- Maximilian Voloshin (1877–1932), Ukrainian-born Russian poet
- Mikhail Voloshin (1953–2020), Russian-American theoretical physicist
- Sergei Voloshin (born 1953), Russian-American nuclear physicist
- Vera Voloshina (1919–1941), Russian partisan
  - 2009 Voloshina, main-belt asteroid named after Vera

=== Voloshyn, Voloshyna ===
- Anna Voloshyna (born 1991), Ukrainian synchro swimmer
- Avgustyn Voloshyn (1874–1945), Ukrainian politician, teacher, and essayist
- Dmytro Voloshyn (disambiguation), multiple people
- Nazar Voloshyn (born 2003), Ukrainian footballer
- Oleg Voloshyn (born 1981), Russian-Ukrainian journalist
- Vikentiy Voloshyn (born 2001), Ukrainian footballer
- Vyacheslav Voloshyn (born 1952), Ukrainian scientist

=== Woloshyn ===
- Bruce Woloshyn (born 1964), American digital effects artist and supervisor
- Illya Woloshyn, Canadian actor
- Stan Woloshyn (born 1939), Canadian politician
- Ted Woloshyn (born 1953), Canadian broadcaster

== See also ==
- Wołoszyn
