= Phil Cooley =

Australian rugby league referee (1951–2023)

Personal information
- Full name: Phillip Cooley
- Born: 28 September 1951
- Died: 11 December 2023 (aged 72)

Refereeing information
Years	Competition	Apps
1986–1989	New South Wales Rugby League	30
- Source: rugbyleagueproject.org

Phillip Cooley (28 September 1951 – 11 December 2023) was an Australian rugby league referee.

Cooley began his refereeing career in the Newtown District Junior Rugby League. He was subsequently graded to referee in the New South Wales Rugby League (NSWRL) in 1982, gaining his first first-grade match in 1986.

Cooley controlled 30 first-grade matches between 1986 and 1989. When others were preferred for that role, Cooley reinvented himself as a touch judge. In that capacity he made his most notable contributions to rugby league, officiating in 194 National Rugby League matches (including the 1996, 1997 and 2000 grand finals), and eight State of Origin matches. Cooley retired as an on-field official at the end of 2001. He then went on to the role of video referee for a further 279 first-grade matches. Cooley retired from officiating in 2012, having achieved over 500 first-grade appointments.

In his 2003 book Harrigan: The referee in a league of his own, former leading referee Bill Harrigan reflected that Cooley had been dropped after a 1986 first grade game for several poor decisions, including incorrectly sending Parramatta Eels' Peter Sterling to the sin bin, the only time in Sterling's career. Harrigan noted that Cooley "went on to become one of the best first grade touchies the game has ever had". In 2012 Harrigan, by then director of referees, had occasion to stand down Cooley after he had made a bad call as a video referee. Cooley soon returned to duty and was appointed at the end of 2012 as a video referee for the grand final of the New South Wales Cup.

Cooley died on 11 December 2023, at the age of 72.

== Honours and awards ==
- 2013 – Eric Cox Medal for very significant contribution to the NSWRLRA for at least ten years after receiving Life Membership
- 2013 – NSWRLRA 300 Club inductee for officiating in at least 300 first grade rugby league matches
- 1994 – Life Membership of the NSWRLRA
- 1991 – Award for outstanding contribution to the NSWRLRA
