= Dimitris Papaioannou =

Greek choreographer and visual artist (born 1964)

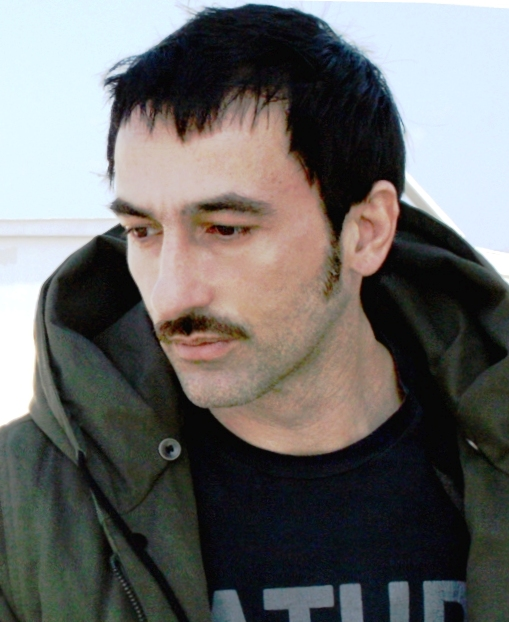
Papaioannou in 2008

Dimitris Papaioannou is an Athenian born on 21 June 1964 who emerged from the Greek underground art scene as a defining figure. Starting as a comics creator, he became a director, choreographer, performer, and designer of sets, costumes, and lighting. His hybrid creations gained a growing dedicated audience in Greece, and in 2004 he became the youngest artist to have been assigned to direct the biggest show on earth: the Olympic Games Opening Ceremonies. A decade later, in 2015, he was discovered by European programmers and was invited to tour.

Papaioannou is an internationally acclaimed avant-garde theatre maker, with Le Figaro describing him as "one of the four most important choreographers in the world". Other newspapers, such as The Times, La Repubblica, described him as "a masterful theatrical magician and imagist," and "the most original choreographer of our time," respectively, with other newspapers such as the New York Times describing his creations as "an act of artistic magic created before our eyes," and The Guardian writing that his work was "a genre of performance unlike anything else [one will] see on stage".

Papaioannou's more than 30 productions range from mass spectacles with thousands of performers to the most intimate pieces. His creations have been commissioned, co-produced, and presented internationally by the most renowned festivals and theatres, enjoying sold-out performances on extensive tours worldwide.

== Fine arts training ==
Born in Athens, Papaioannou, an Athens College graduate, showed a flair for fine art from an early age, and studied under the renowned Greek painter Yannis Tsarouchis for three years in his mid-teens. At 19, he earned himself a place at the Athens School of Fine Arts, entering the institution with the highest marks attained by any student, and there studying under Dimitris Mytaras and Rena Papaspyrou.

== Early recognition ==
Papaioannou first attracted attention as a visual artist, illustrator and comic book creator. He presented his art work at a number of exhibitions, produced illustrations for numerous magazines, and designed and co-edited the countercultural fanzine Kontrosol sto Haos (1986–1992), one of the few publications to include openly gay content at that time in Greece. He also contributed to the Greek gay activist magazine To Kraximo (1981–1994) in the early 1980s, and gave an interview to the publication in 1993. Moreover, he published over 40 comics in Greek alternative comics magazines such as Babel and Para Pende, many of which incorporated gay themes and explicit images (such as 1986's Rock 'n' Roll, 1988's My Ex-Boyfriend, and 1993's Heart-Shaped Earth). He was awarded first prize in a competition organised by Marseille Public Transport Authority at the 5th Biennial of Young Artists from Europe and the Mediterranean, held in Marseille in 1990, for his comic Un Bon Plan.

== Dance training ==
Papaioannou began to take an interest in dance and the performing arts while still at the Athens School of Fine Arts, training and experimenting as a performer and choreographer, as well as a costume, set and make-up designer with dance companies in Greece. In 1986, Papaioannou took a trip to New York City where he was introduced to the Erick Hawkins Technique at the dancer and choreographer's studio, and where he attended seminars on Butoh given by Maureen Fleming at La MaMa E.T.C. While in the United States, he choreographed and performed in the 1986 opera The Monk and the Hangman's Daughter, directed by Ellen Stewart and presented in Baltimore.

== Edafos Dance Theatre (1986–2002) ==
Upon his return to Athens in 1986, he founded Edafos Dance Theatre (έδαφος meaning "ground" in Greek) with Angeliki Stellatou, and went on to conceive, direct, choreograph and produce all 17 of the company's productions over its 16 years of life (the company disbanded in 2002). The group's four early works – The Mountain–The Raincoat in 1987, and Room I–Room II in 1988 – represented Greece at the 3rd and 4th Biennials of Young Artists from Europe and the Mediterranean, held in Barcelona and Bologna respectively, and were warmly received by the press – Stefano Casi of the Italian L'Unità described the company as "the revelation of the Festival" in 1988.

In 1989, Papaioannou left Greece for Germany to work as an unpaid trainee assistant to Robert Wilson in Hamburg as he prepared The Black Rider: The Casting of the Magic Bullets with Tom Waits and William S. Burroughs. He then accompanied Wilson to Berlin to act as a stand-in for the lights for his production of Orlando.

Papaioannou, once back in Athens, created The Last Song of Richard Strauss in collaboration with the visual artist Nikos Alexiou in 1990, the first in a series of critical successes for the Edafos Dance Theatre company. The Last Song was incorporated into the 1991 trilogy The Songs, which was selected to represent Greece the following year at both the 6th Biennial from Young Artists of Europe and the Mediterranean in Valencia and at the Seville Expo '92. The Songs was also seen by the then Greek Minister for Culture Melina Mercouri, who secured regular state funding for the company.

Moons followed in 1992, a two-part work that drew upon the poetry of Sappho and the ballet Le Spectre de la Rose, but it was 1993's Medea that was to prove the company's greatest success. This dance-theatre retelling of the Medea myth was performed 52 times by the year 2000, touring festivals and venues across Europe and the Mediterranean region, visiting New York City, and representing Greece at the Lisbon Expo '98. In her review of the 1998 performance of Medea at the 12th Lyon Dance Biennial, Anna Kisselgoff of The New York Times describes the production as "the festival's big surprise", praising its "extraordinary passion" and "striking intensity". Medea was named "Best Choreography" at the Greek National Awards for Dance in 1994.

Other major Edafos Dance Theatre works include:

1995's A Moment's Silence, the first Greek stage work to deal directly with the issue of AIDS (a topic Papaioannou also tackled in his 1987 comic The Red Freckles on Your Skin), presented the world première of The Songs of Sin, a cycle of songs written by the Oscar-winning composer Manos Hadjidakis, and of the specially commissioned Requiem for the End of Love by composer Yorgos Koumendakis. A Moment's Silence was dedicated to the memory of Alexis Bistikas, who died of AIDS in 1995.

1995's Xenakis' Oresteia – The Aeschylus Suite, a retelling of Aeschylus' Oresteia set to the music of Iannis Xenakis and performed at the Ancient Epidaurus Theatre as part of the Epidaurus Festival.

1999's Human Thirst, a collection of six short choreographies that included 1990's The Last Song of Richard Strauss, won awards for "Best Production" and "Best Female Performance" (Angeliki Stellatou) at the Greek National Awards for Dance. Outside Greece, the production was performed in Cyprus, France and the United Kingdom.

2001's For Ever, a non-narrative work that proved to be the last Edafos Dance Theatre production, was performed for the final time in Athens in the summer of 2002. The work was named "Best Production" at the Greek National Awards for Dance.

== Other work (1986–2000) ==
Beyond his work with Edafos Dance Theatre, Papaioannou undertook a number of other projects between 1986 and 2000.

He directed two operas for the Athens Megaron Concert Hall: Thanos Mikroutsikos's The Return of Helen in 1999 (which was also performed at the Montpellier Opera in France and the Teatro Verdi in Florence, Italy), and Bellini's La Sonnambula in 2000. He also directed two stage shows for the Greek singer Haris Alexiou (1995's Nefeli and 1998's Tree), and two for Alkistis Protopsalti (1998's Volcano and 2000's A Tale).

As a choreographer, Papaioannou worked with the Greek National Theatre, the National Theatre of Northern Greece, Lefteris Vogiatzis' nea SKINI theatre company, and the Athens Festival (a 1994 show with George Dalaras), and created choreographies for two works directed by the Oscar-nominated director Michael Cacoyannis: 1994's Theodora, written and performed by Irene Papas, and the 1995 production of Luigi Cherubini's opera Medea, for which he also produced the costumes. He also designed sets and costumes for the Greek National Opera, and a number of Greek theatre and dance companies. As a performer, he worked with numerous Greek dance companies, including OKTANA Dance Theatre.

His film work included performances in Menelaos Karamagiolis' 1998 feature film Black Out p.s. Red Out and the 1990 film short The Kiss by Alexis Bistikas (which saw him engage in an on-screen kiss with the actor Stavros Zalmas), and sets for Bistikas' 1989 film short The Marbles.

== Choreographies ==
- The Mountain (Liberal Arts Centre Athens, Greece – 1987)
- The Raincoat (Halki, Greece – 1987)
- Room I (Old Elefsina Soap Factory, Elefsina, Greece – 1988)
- Room II (4th Biennial of Young Artists from Europe, Bologna, Italy – 1988)
- The Last Song of Richard Strauss (University of Patras, Greece, 1990)
- The Songs (Artists' Building Athens, Greece, 1991)
- Moons (Artists' Building Athens, Greece, 1992)
- Medea (Koninklijke Nederlandse Schouwburg, Antwerp, Belgium, 1993)
- Iphigenia at the Bridge of Arta (Dimitris Mitropoulos Hall of the Megaron, Athens Concert Hall, Greece, 1995)
- Xenakis' Oresteia – The Aeschylus Suite (Epidaurus Ancient Theatre, Epidavros, Greece, 1995)
- A Moment's Silence (Neo Faliro Old Electric Power Station, Athens, Greece, 1995)
- Nefeli (Nefeli Studio, Athens, Greece, 1995)
- The Brother Grimm Fairytales (Ancient Theatre, Argos, Greece 1996)
- Dracula (Kotopouli-Rex Theatre, Athens, Greece 1997)
- Monument (Port Authority Warehouse, Kalamata, Greece 1997)
- The Storm (1997)
- Volcano (Municipal Theatre of Piraeus, Piraeus, Greece 1998)
- Tree (Diogenis Studio, Athens, Greece, 1998)
- The Return of Helen (Friends of Music Hall of Athens Concert Hall, Megaron, Athens, Greece, 1999)
- Human Thirst (Hora Theatre, Athens, Greece, 1999)
- La Sonnambula (Friends of Music Hall of the Athens Concert Halle, Megaron, Athens, Greece 2000)
- A Tale (Diogenis Studio, Athens, Greece, 2000)
- For Ever (7th Kalamata International Dance Festival, Kalamata, Greece, 2001)
- Birthplace 2004 (2004)
- Closing Ceremony, Athens Olympic Games 2004 (2004)
- Before (Ancient Epidaurus Little Theatre, Epidavros, Greece, 2005)
- Black Box (Kalamata Castle Amphitheatre, Kalamata, Greece, 2005)
- 2 (Pallas Theatre, Athens, Greece, 2006)
- Medea 2 (Athens Festival, Peiraios 260, Hall, 2008)
- Nowhere (Ziller Building-Main Stage, Greek National Theatre, 2009)
- The Colour of the Sun (2010)
- Homer's Iliad – Book Four (Ziller Building – Hall, Greek National Theatre, 2010)
- K.K. (Pallas Theatre, Athens, Greece, 2010)
- Inside (Pallas Theatre, Athens, Greece, 2011)
- Primal Matter (2012)
- Still Life (Onassis Cultural Centre – Main Stage, Athens, Greece, 2014)
- Origins 2015 (Baku Olympic Stadium, 2015)
- The Great Tamer (2017)
- Since She (Tanztheater Wuppertal Pina Bausch, Germany, 2018)
- Sisyphus Trans Form (Collezione Maramotti, Reggio Emilia, Italy, 2019 & at NEON | Portals at the former Public Tobacco Factory, Athens Greece, 2021)
- INK (2020)
- Transverse Orientation (2021)
- This that Keeps On - a personal archeology (Odeon of Herodes Atticus for the Museum of Cycladic Art, Athens, Greece, 2025)
- Requiem for the End of Love (Greek National Opera, Athens, Greece, 2026)
- Rosalía by Dimitris Papaioannou - staging for the Lux Tour, "La Perla" (2026)

== Post-Edafos work ==
=== Athens 2004 Olympic ceremonies ===
In 2001, Papaioannou was appointed artistic director of the opening and closing ceremonies of the 2004 Summer Olympics by Gianna Angelopoulos-Daskalaki, president of the Athens 2004 Organising Committee for the Olympic Games. The ceremonies took three years to produce the opening ceremony, and the show was hailed a "triumph" by Time magazine and The Times of London.

In 2005, following the success of the Athens 2004 Olympic ceremonies, Papaioannou received the Golden Cross of the Order of Honour, awarded by the president of the Hellenic Republic for outstanding artistic achievement.

=== 2 ===
On 24 November 2006, Papaioannou premièred 2 in Athens, his first work following his creative direction of the Opening and closing ceremonies of the Athens 2004 Olympic Games. 2 was produced in collaboration with the electronic music composer K.BHTA for the production company Elliniki Theamaton. A "dissection of the male psyche", the production commanded a large of amount of Greek press attention, not least for its open references to homosexuality. 2 proved a commercial success; its run was extended twice and over 100,000 tickets were sold in total.

The work seems to draw upon a range of influences, including the work of Jean Genet, René Magritte and Robert Wilson. Inspiration for the show also came partly from Papaioannou's experiences as a gay man in Greece. Contemporary magazine described 2 as an "inspiring" work that "captures the zeitgeist".

A DVD of 2, produced and directed for the screen by Athina Rachel Tsangari of HAOS FILM, was released on 11 December 2007 by Elliniki Theamaton and Modern Times.

=== INSIDE ===
Inside is a large-scale on-stage experiment by Dimitris Papaioannou that took place in a room set inside the Pallas Theatre in central Athens. Inside this room, for twenty nights in the Spring of 2011, a simple series of movements documenting our daily return home was uniformly repeated by thirty performers in countless combinations and superimpositions. Six hours on stage with no beginning, middle or end. Visitors could watch as much as they liked, sit wherever they liked, exit and re-enter as many times as they liked. The stage action began before visitors came in, and continued after they left.

Inside encouraged audiences to treat the theatre as an exhibition space and the work as an exhibit, and to watch the action as if gazing at a landscape.

Inside was conceived as a kind of visual meditation. The work was developed along two parallel trains of thought. On the one hand, with a view to the emotional charge that is created when we sense the similarity of all human beings inside their nest. And on the other, an interest in the form of the artwork itself — in how a single motif can become a kind of latent narrative through its repetition and multiplication (like on ancient Greek Geometric vases and Eastern patterned carpets).

Inside's final night was filmed in a single, six-hour take and first presented as a video installation as part of Ανταλλαγή / Austausch / Exchange, a 2012 Goethe-Institut art project curated by Sofia Dona, at the Broadway open-air cinema in Athens. The following year, it was projected one summer night at the Kalamata International Dance Festival's open-air Castle Amphitheatre.

=== STILL LIFE ===
Still Life premiered at the Onassis Cultural Center - Athens on May 23, 2014.

Still Life springs from a meditation upon the myth of Sisyphus, who was sentenced to a weird kind of immortality: he would roll a huge rock up to the top of a mountain, only for the rock to roll back down. He would then walk down in order to roll the rock up again. Over and over, eternally. Sisyphus is like a working class hero.

While creating Still Life, Dimitris Papaioannou thought a lot about the human craving for meaning, and about the absurdity of the human condition, rooted in matter but yearning for spirit. He was thinking about Albert Camus, and about work as meaning in and of itself. At the same time, Dimitris Papaioannou concentrated deeply on simplicity, interaction with real materials, and silence — musically composed silence.

Still Life is a work about work. About confronting physical matter in order to elevate our existence above it. It is an attempt towards a kind of theatre that generates meditative energy through simple actions, and encourages an emotional journey through optical illusions.

== Europe Theatre Prize ==
In 2017, he received a Special Prize of the XIV Europe Prize Theatrical Realities, in Rome, awarded by the president of the jury and the Europe Theatre Prize, with the following motivation:

As part of the Europe Prize Theatrical Realities, this year sees a Special Prize awarded to Dimitris Papaioannou. Performer, director, choreographer and visual artist, he has reached the highest peaks of international theatre with his work. From the end of the 80s until now, during a rich career, Papaioannou has made a vast contribution, in Greece and the rest of the world, to contemporary theatre, visual art, dance and other forms of artistic expression. His theatre is 'total', with an obvious maturity of expression, offering for the stage a perfect form of signification in which bodies, objects, costumes and the entire scenic set-up are transformed into fluctuating visual signs, visual signs into events, events into stories and emotions. With such a talent, Dimitris Papaioannou can tell every story – myth, history, emotional moments, the human condition today, hypermodernity – and make each one unforgettable.

== See also ==
- List of Dimitris Papaioannou works
- List of Dimitris Papaioannou comics
