= Eric Cox =

Australian rugby league referee and administrator

Personal information
- Full name: Eric Holsbury Cox
- Born: 1923 Burwood, New South Wales, Australia
- Died: 4 December 2006 (aged 83) Bankstown, New South Wales, Australia

Coaching information
Club
Years	Team	Gms	W	D	L	W%
1950	St. George Presidents Cup
1971–1974	Alexander Mackie College
	Total	0	0	0	0

Eric Holsbury Cox OAM (1923 – 4 December 2006) was an Australian rugby league coach, referee and administrator.

== Career ==
Cox was born in Burwood, New South Wales in 1923. He joined the Royal Australian Navy in 1940, serving on HMAS Kanimbla during World War II. After the war Cox transferred to the civilian arm of the Navy, working as a public service administrator until his retirement. He maintained a strong interest in Navy Rugby League.

After playing football in Lismore, Brisbane and Townsville, Cox returned to Sydney to coach the St. George Presidents Cup team in 1950. He gained his referees certificate in 1951 and went on to referee in district and state competitions.

Cox's career in rugby league administration began in 1955 as Secretary of the St George Referees Association. He was subsequently elected as Secretary of the New South Wales Rugby League (NSWRL) Referees Association, a position he held from 1963 to 1977. During that time he was appointed manager of the 1966 NSWRL team for its annual series against the Queensland Rugby League.

In 1971, Cox returned to coaching. He coached Alexander Mackie College in the University Cup competition, the team winning the premiership from 1971 to 1974.

In 1978, Cox was appointed as the inaugural Director of Referees for the NSWRL, responsible for the appointment of all referees in the state competition. He held that position for five years.

Cox then moved to the position of Ground Manager, being responsible for the administration of all on-ground activity including players, officials and television crews. During this time he was noted for running a "tight ship" and nothing untoward happened on his watch, however, he displayed his softer side through actions such as ensuring the game ball was presented to a retiring player. Cox was cited as assisting bad boy John Hopoate to become a referee despite Cox's involvement in Hopoate's banning several months earlier. He also lodged a complaint against South Sydney cheerleaders for wearing too-brief costumes.

Cox died on 4 December 2006 from a stroke and pneumonia, the result of asbestosis. His wife of fifty-nine years, Colleen, died twelve weeks later. They are survived by their three children, Christopher, David and Julie.

== Honours ==
Cox was awarded the Medal of the Order of Australia (OAM) on 10 June 2002 for "service to Rugby League football as a player, referee, coach and administrator".

He had earlier been awarded the Australian Sports Medal in 2000 for "lifelong involvement with Rugby League".

Other honours awarded to Cox include life memberships of the New South Wales Rugby League (NSWRL) and the NSWRL Referees Association, the Australian Rugby League Referees Association and the St George Referees Association.

Bankstown City Council named a local park in Cox's honour. Following the closure of the nearby Revesby Heights Ex-Servicemen's Club, its war memorial was relocated to Cox Reserve.

The Australian Navy Rugby League champion team is awarded The Bosun's Cup, named after Cox, who was a bosun during World War II.

== Obituaries ==
- 'The Bosun' will be sadly missed (Fox Sports)
- League legend Eric Cox O.A.M. passes away (New South Wales Rugby League)
