= NRL match officials =

The NRL match officials are a select group of trained professional and semi-professional rugby league match officials who officiate in the National Rugby League (NRL) and lower tier rugby league competitions, including the Holden Cup, the Intrust Super Premiership NSW and the Intrust Super Cup.

== Current Officials ==
=== NRL Referees ===
Name	NRL Matches (Mens)	State Of Origin Matches (Mens)	International Matches (Mens)	NRL Finals (Mens)
Ashley Klein	452	23	61	34
Gerard Sutton	448	22	39	40
Grant Atkins	343	0	15	19
Adam Gee	316	0	11	18
Chris Butler^{☆}	155	0	2	0
Peter Gough	189	0	6	0
Ziggy Przeklasa-Adamski	78	0	2	0
Todd Smith	122	0	7	2
Liam Kennedy	72	0	2	0
Tyson Brough	3	0	2	0
Kieren Irons	2	0	1	0
Nick Pelgrave	2	0	1	0
Wyatt Raymond	60	0	2	0
Belinda Sharpe	23	0	18	0
Kasey Badger	5	0	3	0

^{☆}Indicates 'Chris Butler' is no longer an On Field Referee in the National Rugby League, and has been stood down to 'Bunker' Duties.

=== NRLW Referees ===
Name	NRLW Matches	State Of Origin Matches (Women's)	International Matches (Women's)
Kasey Badger	44	1	10
Izzy Davidson	2	0	0
Josh Eaton	9	0	0
Peter Gough	7	1	1
Kieren Irons	2	0	0
Liam Kennedy	8	0	2
Ethan Klein	5	0	0
Karra-Lee Nolan	19	0	1
Ziggy Przeklasa-Adamski	24	0	2
Luke Saldern	13	0	0
Belinda Sharpe	56	13	16
Rochelle Tamarua	20	0	2
Dillan Wells	9	0	1
Tori Wilkie	15	0	0

=== Bunker Duties ===
Name	NRL Matches in Bunker	NRLW Matches in Bunker	State Of Origin Games in Bunker (Men's)	State Of Origin Games in Bunker (Women's)	International Games in Bunker (Men's)	International Games in Bunker (Women's)
Grant Atkins	153	0	8	1	10	4
Kasey Badger	74	42	0	4	0	1
Chris Butler	240	17	6	1	9	2
Adam Gee	121	8	0	2	12	5
Peter Gough	13	28	0	0	0	3
Liam Kennedy	58	19	1	1	3	4
Ashley Klein	385	1	2	2	28	3
Wyatt Raymond	50	9	0	1	2	2
Belinda Sharpe	0	10	0	0	0	0
Todd Smith	8	32	0	0	1	2
Gerard Sutton	80	16	0	1	4	2

== See also ==
- List of National Rugby League referees
- RFL Match officials
