= Dimitrije Dimitrijević =

Dimitrije Dimitrijević may refer to:

- Dimitrije Dimitrijević (footballer), a Yugoslav founder of FK Željezničar Sarajevo
- Dimitrije Dimitrijević (Chetnik), Serbian guerrilla fighter
- Dimitrije Dimitrijević (singer), stage name of Dimitrije Simović a singer-songwriter from Zagreb, Croatia, and member of Igralom
