= Dmytro =

Dmytro (Ukrainian: Дмитро́, romanized: Dmytró, [dmɪˈtrɔ]) is a Ukrainian name, derived from the Greek Demetrios.

== Nicknames ==
Nicknames of the name Dmytro include:

- Dima (Діма; most common)
- Dimochka (Дімочка)
- Dimulia (Дімуля)
- Dimusha (Дімуша)
- Dimusia (Дімуся)
- Dmytryk (Дмитрик)
- Dimon (Дімон)
- Metro (Метро; particularly in Canada)
- Mytia (Митя)
- Mitenka (Мітенька)
- Mytiai (Митяй)
- Mitiaichik (Мітяйчік)
- Mitiusha (Мітюша)
- Mitiushenka (Мітюшенька)
- Mitiulia (Мітюля)
- Mitiunia (Мітюня)
- Myt'ko (Митько)

== Notable people named Dmytro ==
- Dmytro Antonovych (1877–1945), Ukrainian politician and art historian
- Dmytro Babenko (born 1979), Ukrainian footballer
- Dmytro Bezotosnyy (born 1983), Ukrainian footballer
- Dmytro Boiko (born 1986), Ukrainian sabre fencer
- Dmytro Boyko (born 1981), Ukrainian professional footballer
- Dmytro Brovkin (born 1984), professional Ukrainian football striker
- Dmytro Chumak (fencer) (born 1980), Ukrainian Olympic épée fencer
- Dmytro Chyhrynskyi (born 1986), Ukrainian footballer
- Dmytro Cipywnyk (1927–2003), Canadian physician and academic
- Dmytro Dontsov (1883–1973), Ukrainian nationalist writer, publisher, journalist and political thinker
- Dmytro Doroshenko (1882–1951), Ukrainian political figure during the revolution of 1917–1918
- Dmytro Grabovskyy (born 1985), Ukrainian professional road bicycle racer
- Dmytro Hlushchenko (born 1981), Ukrainian-Israeli sprinter who specializes in the 100 and 200 metres
- Dmytro Hnatyuk (1925–2016), Ukrainian baritone opera singer, and later parliament member
- Dmytro Hordiyenko (born 1983), professional Ukrainian football striker
- Dmytro Hrachov (born 1983), athlete from Ukraine
- Dmytro Hryshko (born 1985), professional Ukrainian football defender
- Dmytro Hrytsai (1907–1945), leader in the Organization of Ukrainian Nationalists
- Dmytro Hunia, elected hetman of the Zaporozhian Host in 1638
- Dmytro Khovbosha (born 1989), professional Ukrainian football defender
- Dmytro Klyachkivsky (1911–1945), colonel of the UPA, commander of the Ukrainian Insurgent Army (UPA)-North
- Dmytro Korchynskyy,Ukrainian public figure, poet and publicist
- Dmytro Kozachenko, Ukrainian professional football goalkeeper
- Dmytro Kozban (born 1989), professional Ukrainian football striker
- Dmytro Levytsky (1877–1942), lawyer and major political figure in western Ukraine between the two world wars
- Dmytro Lyopa (born 1988), Ukrainian football midfielder
- Dmytro Lysenko (born 1981), Ukrainian Olympic diver
- Demitro "Dick" Michayluk (1911–1990), politician in Saskatchewan, Canada
- Dmytro Mikhay (born 1990), Ukrainian rower
- Dmytro Mykhaylenko (born 1973), Ukrainian midfielder
- Dmytro Nazarov (born 1977), Ukrainian football defender
- Dmytro Nevmyvaka (born 1984), professional Ukrainian football player
- Dmytro Parfenov (born 1974), retired Ukrainian footballer
- Dmytro Pavlychko, Ukrainian poet, translator, scriptwriter, culturologist, political and public figure
- Dmytro "Metro" Prystai (1927–2013), Ukrainian-Canadian ice hockey player
- Dmytro Semochko (born 1979), Ukrainian footballer
- Dmytro Shurov (born 1981), Ukrainian pianist, composer, and singer-songwriter
- Dmytro Shutkov (born 1972), Ukrainian footballer
- Dmytro Skapintsev (born 1998), Ukrainian basketball player in the Israeli Basketball Premier League
- Dmytro Stoyko (born 1975), Ukrainian football goalkeeper
- Dmytro Tereshchenko (born 1987), Ukrainian professional footballer
- Dmytro Tiapushkin (born 1964), retired Ukrainian professional footballer and a current coach
- Dmytro Timashov (born 1996), Ukrainian–Swedish ice hockey player (forward)
- Dmytro Topchiyev (born 1966), retired Russian born Ukrainian professional footballer
- Dmytro Tyapushkin (born 1964), retired Ukrainian professional footballer and a current coach
- Dmytro Vitovsky (1887–1919), Ukrainian politician and military leader
- Dmytro Vladov (born 1990), Ukrainian football midfielder
- Dmytro Voloshyn (disambiguation) (both born 1986), two different Ukrainian football defenders
- Dmytro Vorobey (born 1985), Ukrainian footballer
- Dmytro Vorobyov (born 1977), Ukrainian football goalkeeper
- Dmytro Vyshnevetsky, Hetman of the Ukrainian Cossacks
- Dmytro Yakimischak (1888–1958), politician in Manitoba, Canada
- Dmytro Yavornytsky (1855–1940), Ukrainian historian, archeologist, ethnographer, folklorist, and lexicographer
- Dmytro Yesin (born 1980), professional Ukrainian football midfielder
- Dmytro Zabirchenko (born 1984), professional basketball player
- Dmytro Zhdankov (born 1984), professional Ukrainian football goalkeeper
- Dmytro Zipchen (1905–1996), politician in Saskatchewan, Canada
- Voivode Dmytro, appointed military commander of Kyiv by Prince Danylo of Galicia in 1239, charged with defending the city from the Mongols
