= Dimont (surname) =

Dimont is a surname. Notable people with the surname include:

- Max Dimont (1912–1992), Finnish American historian and author
- Jacques Dimont (1945–1994), French fencer

== Fictional characters ==
- Dandie Dinmont, a character in Guy Mannering, a novel by Walter Scott, after which the Dandie Dimont Terrier breed was named

== See also ==
- Dimon (disambiguation)
- Diamont
