= Dmytro Voloshyn =

Dmytro Voloshyn may refer to:

- Dmytro Vitaliyovych Voloshyn, FC Kremin Kremenchuk defender
- Dmytro Oleksandrovych Voloshyn, IFK Mariehamn defender
- Dmytro Serhiiovych Voloshyn, Ukrainian colonel, commander of Ukraine's 82nd Air Assault Brigade
