= Dimitris Kraniotis =

Greek dancer and poet (born 1950)

Dimitrios Kraniotis (Greek: Δημήτριος Κ. Κρανιώτης; born 1950) is a Greek dancer and poet who lives in France.

== Biography ==
=== Early life ===
Dimitrios Κ. Kraniotis was born in 1950 in Athens, Greece. He studied philosophy and mathematics in Paris, and later, also theology and poetry. He lived in the monasteries of Mount Athos.

=== Career ===
He started his career as a dancer and choreographic assistant with Jerome Andrews. He was later assistant and dramaturg for Pina Bausch's Wuppertaler Tanztheater. Together with Christine Kono, he has held classes and workshops based on the movement research of Jerome Andrews and classical ballet since 1994.

== Bibliography ==
=== Poetry ===
- Eros Etrange Etranger: Desmos/Cahiers grecs, Paris, 1997. Bilingual edition French/Greek, translated by M. Volkovitch. ISBN 2-911427-06-8
- Altier l'Aurige (O Iníochos Agérochos): Mimnermos, Athens, 1993. Bilingual edition French/Greek, translated by M. Volkovitch.
- Abysmal Spring (Ávyssos Ánoixis): Ikaros, Athens, 1989
- Vagrant Fate (Alítis Moíra): Agra, Athens, 1985.
- Eros Stranger (Ἔρως ἀλλογενής): Athens, 1979

=== Selected poems ===
- D'Estoc et d'Intaille - L'epigramme: Les Belles Lettres, Paris, 2003 ISBN 2-251-49017-5
- Anthologie de la poésie grecque contemporaine: Gallimard/poésie, Paris, 2000. ISBN 978-2-07-041253-2
- L'accueil de l'Oblique: Le Nouveau Recueil, N°48, 1998. ISBN 2-87673-274-2
