= Nestor Dimitrijević =

Serbian merchant and philanthropist

Nestor Dimitrijević (Serbian Cyrillic: Нестор Димитријевић; 14 October 1782 - 3 February 1856) was a merchant, great Serbian benefactor, founder of his "Endowment" at the Matica Srpska in Novi Sad, for the education of poor and hardworking students.

== Biography ==
Dimitrijević was a prominent figure in Veliki Bečkerek, where he successfully traded in groceries for years. His last name was Demetrović, and eventually changed to Dimitrijević. It is the same in 1834, where he is on the list of subscribers to the magazine "Serbian Chronicle". In 1830, he was a subscriber to a book - a novel, as a merchant and an elected member of the Veliki Beckerek community (1829–1830). He had a servant who stayed with him for fifty years, because he was an honest master. During his life, he proved to be an honest, hard-working, thrifty man, but with a "merciful heart". This great benefactor helped many poor students with clothes and money. He was also a great donor to the Serbian Orthodox Church community in Bečkerek.

Nestor had brothers Kuzman and Kiril (also a merchant), and the Dimitrijević family comes from the border town of Jakov in Srem. Dimitrijević predicted in his will that the children and descendants of his brothers or relatives from Jakov, if they go to school and apply for his scholarship, will have priority in choosing. That is how it was, so five scholarship holders from the Dimitrijević family were educated.

In the period of Serb uprising of 1848–49, Dimitrijević joined the Serb National Board, founded in Veliki Bečkerek. He was a member of the Municipal Board and a city senator for many years.

== Foundation ==
He left a will (with the Founding Letter) 10/22. January 1856 in which he predicted how the money he left to Matica Srpska would be spent. The executors of the will were supposed to sell off all his property, plots and securities and invest in his fund. If there were changes in the society, which would change the purpose of the fund, Nestor predicted that it would come under the management of the Serbian church, in the person of the metropolitan. The Serbian archbishop of Karlovac gave scholarships at the suggestion of Matica Srpska, which regularly announced competitions. The following condition was valid for the selection of future cadets who will be awarded scholarships: A participant in my seduction can be any father or mother born in Serbia, of the Orthodox Eastern religion, if not only of good moral behavior, but also of great success in science. His last will was witnessed by the citizens of Veliki Beckerek: Nikola Atanasijević, Georgije Mihailović and Petar Aronović. His entire estate is worth more than £52,000 was opted for Serbian youth. The curator of the "universal heir", which will be his Endowment (which Sandić called Nestorianum from miles away), was, at his last will, Vladimir Mihailović from Beckerek.

The executors of his will were Jovan Trifunac and Mihailo Tanazević. In April 1861, they deposited 500 bequests directly bequeathed to the Matica Srpska. According to the report from January 1862, it was seen that Nestor's scholarship started working during the testator's lifetime. He chose the first three scholarship holders from Veliki Bečkerek, whom he knew personally: Aleksandar Sandić, Georgije (Đorđe) Mandrović and Stefan Đakonović. For them he determined exceptionally 300 florin scholarships, if they prove to be good. He also had in mind "poor Tanazevic", who would also pay 300 florin received annually for schooling. How one of Nestor's conditions was that the four sons of Veliko Bečke must always be in the enjoyment of this benevolence. During the operation of the Endowment, as many as 43 young people from Bečkerek were educated. Among the most famous are: Dr. Emil Gavrila, Djordje Mandrović, Dr. Vasa Savić, Pavle Bota, Aleksandar Sandić and others. Grateful cadet Djordje Mandrović, as a chaplain in Dolovo, Pančevo, published a book of poems "Predzor" in 1864. He dedicated it to the memory of the late Nestor Dimitrijević, a former citizen of Veliki Bečkerek and a great Serbian benefactor.

It was not until November 1862 that the magistrate of Veliko Bečkere handed over the endowment to the Serbian national funds. And already at the beginning of the school year 1863–1864, all 10 scholarship places were filled. In 1875, the Nestor Dimitrijević Foundation from Veliki Bečkerek, from 1856, the Patriarchate and the Matica Srpska announced a competition for the selection of scholarship holders. Three "legal and multi-military" scholarships of £250 each. Two more scholarships for "philosophical and polytechnic sciences" for 200 florin Four scholarships for small grammar schools of £150 each. A total of £1,750 was earmarked.

A large number of prominent individuals and highly educated people owe their initial success in life to the dedicated visionary—Nestor Dimitrijević.

Nestor Dimitrijević died in Veliki Bečkerek in 1856, and was buried in the Tomaševac City Cemetery. Every year on 24 September he was given a memorial service in the Church of the Assumption in Bečkerec. Professor Aleksandar Sandić, as his first work, published a sermon which he gave at the memorial service for his benefactor on Krstovdan in 1860.
