= Dimitris Giovanakis =

Greek footballer

Personal information
- Full name: Dimitris Giovanakis
- Date of birth: 21 August 1986 (age 40)
- Place of birth: Chios, Greece
- Height: 1.79 m (5 ft 10 in)
- Position: Defender

Senior career*
| Years | Team | Apps | (Gls) |
| n/a–n/a | A.E. Chios-Vrontados | n/a (n/a) | |
| 2007–2008 | Aiolikos | 5 (–) | |
- * Club domestic league appearances and goals

Dimitris Giovanakis (Greek: Δημήτρης Γιοβανάκης; born 21 August 1986 in Chios, Greece) is a Greek football player.
