= Dimitra =

Dimitra may refer to:

== People ==
- Dimitra Arliss, Greek American actress
- Dimitra Asilian, female Greek water polo player
- Dimitra Liani, widow of the former Greek Prime Minister Andreas Papandreou
- Dimitra Papadea, Greek singer
- Dimitra Simeonidou, telecommunications engineer

== Places in Greece ==
- Dimitra, Arcadia, a village in Arcadia, part of Kontovazaina
- Dimitra, Elis, a village in Elis, part of Vartholomio
- Dimitra, Grevena, a village in the Grevena regional unit, part of Chasia
- Dimitra, Larissa, a village in the Larissa regional unit, part of Lakereia
- Dimitra, Serres, a village in the Serres regional unit, part of Nea Zichni

== See also ==
- Demeter (Demetra)
- Demetria
