= List of Dimitris Papaioannou works =

List of stage works by Dimitris Papaioannou

== 1980s ==
- The Mountain – Edafos Dance Theatre, 1987
- The Raincoat – Edafos Dance Theatre, 1987
- Room I – Edafos Dance Theatre, 1988
- Room II – Edafos Dance Theatre, 1988

== 1990s ==
- The Last Song of Richard Strauss – Edafos Dance Theatre, 1990
- The Songs – Edafos Dance Theatre, 1991
- Moons – Edafos Dance Theatre, 1992
- Medea – Edafos Dance Theatre, 1993
- Iphigeneia at the Bridge of Arta – Edafos Dance Theatre, 1995
- Xenakis' Oresteia – The Aeschylus Suite – Edafos Dance Theatre, 1995
- A Moment’s Silence – Edafos Dance Theatre, 1995
- Nefeli (stage show for Haris Alexiou), 1995
- The Brothers Grimm Fairy Tales – Edafos Dance Theatre, 1996
- Dracula – Edafos Dance Theatre, 1997
- Monument – Edafos Dance Theatre, 1997
- The Storm – Edafos Dance Theatre, 1997
- Volcano (stage show for Alkistis Protopsalti), 1998
- Tree (stage show for Haris Alexiou), 1998
- The Return of Helen (for the Athens Megaron Concert Hall), 1999
- Human Thirst – Edafos Dance Theatre, 1999

== 2000s ==
- La Sonnambula (for the Athens Megaron Concert Hall), 2000
- A Tale (stage show for Alkistis Protopsalti), 2000
- For Ever – Edafos Dance Theatre, 2001
- Opening Ceremony – Athens 2004 Olympic Games, 2004
- Closing Ceremony – Athens 2004 Olympic Games, 2004
- Before, 2005
- Black Box, 2005
- 2, 2006
- MEDEA^{2}, 2008
- Nowhere, 2009

== 2010s ==
- K.K., 2010
- Inside, 2011
- Primal Matter, 2012
- Still Life, 2014
- ORIGINS – Opening Ceremony – First European Games, Baku 2015
- The Great Tamer, 2017
- Seit Sie [Since She], Tanztheater Wuppertal Pina Bausch, 2018

== 2020s ==
- INK, 2020
- Transverse Orientation, 2021
- This that Keeps On - a personal archeology, 2025
- Requiem for the End of Love, 2026
