= Dimon =

Dimon may refer to:

- Dimon (surname)
- Alternate name of the Biblical city of Dibon

== Given name ==
- A diminutive of the Russian given name Dmitry
  - A nickname of Russian politician Dmitry Medvedev popularized by the film He Is Not Dimon to You of the Russian Anti-Corruption Foundation
  - Dimon, fictional character in the 2003 Russian film Bimmer
- Dimon McFerson, American business executive
- Oliver Dimon Kellogg (1878-1932), American mathematician

== See also ==
- Diamond (disambiguation)
