= Peter Pierse =

Australian rugby league referee

Personal information
- Full name: Peter Anthony Pierse
- Born: 23 March 1947
- Died: 4 September 1991

Refereeing information
Years	Competition	Apps
1981	New South Wales Rugby League	2
- Source: rugbyleagueproject.org

Peter Pierse (died 4 September 1991) was an Australian rugby league referee.

Pierse began his refereeing career in the Newtown District Junior Rugby League. He was subsequently graded to referee in the New South Wales Rugby League (NSWRL). He refereed two first grade matches in 1981.
