= Rena Papaspyrou =

Greek visual artist

Rena Papaspyrou (Greek: Ρένα Παπασπύρου; born 1938) is a Greek visual artist and Professor Emeritus at the Athens School of Fine Arts. In 1992, she became the first woman to be elected as a director of a workshop at the School (Painting Workshop III).

== Career ==
Rena Papaspyrou was born in 1938 in Athens, where she continues to live and work. She studied painting and mosaic at the Athens School of Fine Arts from 1958 to 1961 and furthered her studies in Paris from 1961 to 1967 at the Beaux-Arts de Paris. She was a scholarship recipient from the French government and the National Organization of Greek Handicrafts.

Papaspyrou is known for her choice of unconventional surfaces such as planks, metal sheets, and walls, initially focusing on bricks in her early years. In the 1970s, she explored the effects of light and shadow. Since the 1990s, she has created numerous large-scale installations and environments.

Since 1966, Papaspyrou has held many solo exhibitions in Greece and abroad. In 2009, a major retrospective exhibition titled "Flashback" was held at the Macedonian Museum of Contemporary Art, accompanied by a monograph of the same name. She joined the faculty of the Athens School of Fine Arts in 1978 and in 1992 became the first woman to direct a workshop there. She taught until 2005.
