= Dmytro Voloshyn (footballer, born April 1986) =

Ukrainian former footballer

Personal information
- Full name: Dmytro Oleksandrovych Voloshyn
- Date of birth: 29 April 1986 (age 40)
- Place of birth: Donetsk, Ukrainian SSR, Soviet Union
- Height: 1.80 m (5 ft 11 in)
- Position: Defender

Youth career
- 1999: Olimpik-UOR
- 2000: Shakhtar-2
- 2001–2004: Shakhtar Youth

Senior career*
Years	Team	Apps	(Gls)
2004–2005	Shakhtar-3 Donetsk	16	(0)
2006	Shakhtar-2 Donetsk	7	(0)
2007	Olimpik Donetsk	9	(0)
2008	Norrvalla	0	(0)
2009–2010	Mariehamn	21	(0)
Total		79	(0)
- * Club domestic league appearances and goals as of 2021

Dmytro Oleksandrovych Voloshyn (Ukrainian: Дмитро Олександрович Волошин; born 29 April 1986) is a Ukrainian former footballer who played as a defender.

== Club history ==
Dmytro Voloshyn began his football career with the Olimpik-UOR youth club in Donetsk.
