= Demetrius =

Ancient Greek male given name meaning "devoted to Demeter"

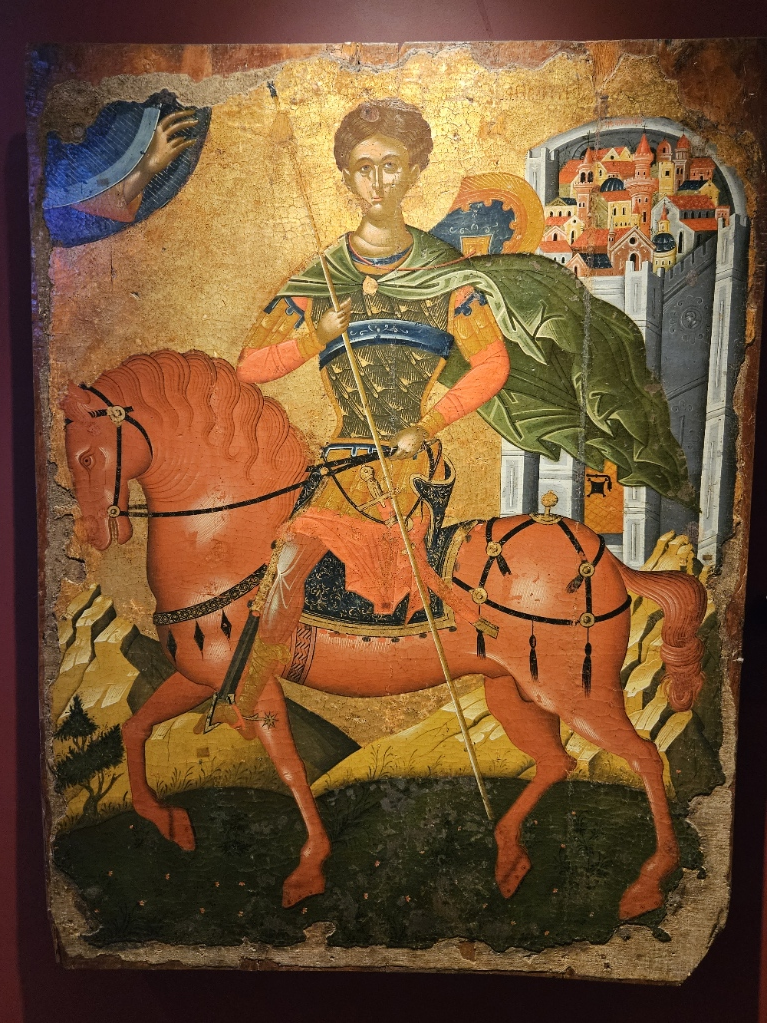
- Saint Demetrios, a painting from the late 16th century by an unknown artist, in the Byzantine Museum of Antivouniotissa in Corfu.
- Gender: Male

Origin
- Origin: Greek
- Meaning: tribute to Goddess of Grain: Demeter, Mother-Earth

Other names
- Related names: Dimitrije, Demetria, Dimitrios, Demetra, Demi, Dimitris, Dmitry, Dimitar, Mitar, Dmytro, Dimitrie, Dumitru, Dhimitër

Demetrius is the Latinized form of the Ancient Greek male given name Dēmḗtrios (Δημήτριος), meaning "devoted to goddess Demeter". Alternate forms include Demetrios, Dimitrios, Dimitris, Dmytro, Dimitri, Dimitrie, Dimitar, Dumitru, Demitri, Dhimitër, Dimitrije and Zmicier, in addition to other forms (such as Russian Dmitry) descended from it. Nicknames include Demmie, Dimmie, Demi, Jim, Jimmy, Jimmie, Metry, Metrie, Mimmie, Demetri, Dmitri, Mitică, Mitya and Dima.

Demetrius and its variations may refer to the following:

== Real people ==
=== Ancient ===
- Demetrius of Alopece, 4th century BC Greek sculptor noted for his realism
- Demetrius of Phalerum (c. 350 – c. 280 BC)
- Demetrius (somatophylax), somatophylax of Alexander the Great (d. 330 BC)
- Demetrius I of Macedon (337–283 BC), called Poliorcetes, son of Antigonus I Monophthalmus, King of Macedonia 294–288 BC
- Demetrius the Fair (Demetrius the Handsome, Demetrius of Cyrene) (285 BC-249/250 BC) - Hellenistic king of Cyrene
- Demetrius II Aetolicus, son of Antigonus II, King of Macedonia 239–229 BC
- Demetrius (son of Philip V), son of Philip V of Macedon
- Demetrius of Pharos, ruler of Pharos c. 222 – 219 BC, involved in the First Illyrian War
- Demetrius the Chronographer (late 3rd century BC), Jewish chronicler (historian)
- Demetrius I Soter (185–150 BC), king of Syria
- Demetrius I of Bactria (d. 180 BC), Greek king of Bactria
- Demetrius II of India (fl. early 2nd century BC), possible relative of the above
- Demetrius II Nicator (d. 125 BC), son of Demetrius I Soter
- Demetrius III Aniketos, Indo-Greek king c. 100 BC
- Demetrius III Eucaerus (d. 88 BC), son of Antiochus VIII Grypus, Seleucid King
- Demetrius the Cynic (1st century), Cynic philosopher
- Demetrius (1st century), well-spoken of in the epistle 3 John and bishop of Philadelphia (modern Amman, Jordan)
- Pope Demetrius I of Alexandria, ruled in 189–232
- Demetrius of Thessaloniki (died 306), Christian martyr and saint

=== Medieval ===
- Demetrius of Bulgaria was the second Patriarch of the Bulgarian Orthodox Church between c. 927 and c. 930, and the first one to have been recognized by the Ecumenical Patriarch of Constantinople
- Demetrius Zvonimir of Croatia (died 1089), King of Croatia 1075–1089
- Demetrius I of Georgia, son of David IV the Builder, (1125–1156)
- Demetrio Progoni (1208–1216), medieval Albanian prince

=== Modern ===
- Pseudo-Demetrius I, also known as False Dmitry I, Tsar of Russia, ruled 1605–1606
- Demetrius the Neomartyr (1779–1803), Orthodox Christian martyr and saint
- Pope Demetrius II of Alexandria, ruled in 1861–1870
- Demetrius Stefanovich Schilizzi (1839–1893)
- Demetriu Radu (1861–1920), Romanian Greek Catholic bishop
- Demetrios Trakatellis (born 1928), Greek Orthodox Archbishop of America and Exarch of the Atlantic and Pacific Oceans. In office since 1999.
- Dimitrios Salpingidis, Greek footballer
- Dimitrios Papadopoulos, Greek footballer
- Demetrious Johnson (American football) (1961–2022), American football player
- Dimitrios Douros (born 1980), Greek baseball player
- Demetrious Johnson (born 1986), American mixed martial arts fighter
- Demetrius Rhaney (born 1992), American football player
- Dimitrios Siovas, Greek footballer
- Demetrius Treadwell (born 1991), American basketball player for Hapoel Gilboa Galil of the Israeli League Liga Leumit
- Temetrius Jamel Ja Morant (born 1999), American basketball player for Memphis Grizzlies in the NBA.

== Fictional characters ==
- Demetrius (Shakespeare), a main character in William Shakespeare's play, A Midsummer Night's Dream; Demetrius is also a villainous character in Shakespeare's revenge tragedy, Titus Andronicus
- Demetrius, a character in Mira Nair's Mississippi Masala
- Demetrius, a Greek slave in the Lloyd C. Douglas Christian novel The Robe and its film sequel below
- Demetrius and the Gladiators, a 1953 20th Century Fox film
- Demetrius, one of the Titans in the two-part Charmed episode "Oh My Goddess!"
- Demetrius Desmond, a character in Tatsuya Endo's Spy × Family
- Demetrius, a character in Eric Barone's game, Stardew Valley
- Demetrios, a character in The Young Indiana Jones Chronicles
- Demetri, a fictional character in the Twilight fantasy series
- Demitri Maximoff, a vampire from the Capcom video game series Darkstalkers
- Dmitri Kissoff, a character in Stanley Kubrick's Dr. Strangelove or How I Learned to Stop Worrying and Love the Bomb
- Dimitri Petrenko, a character in the first-person shooter Call of Duty: World at War

== In other languages ==
- Albanian: Dhimitër, Mitër
- Belarusian: Зьміцер, Зьмітрок, Дзмітрый (Źmicier, Źmitrok, Dzmitry)
- Bulgarian: Димитър (Dimitar)
- Catalan: Demetri
- Croatian: Dmitar
- Dutch: Dimitri
- Finnish: Mitri, Mitro, Dimitri
- French: Dimitri
- Georgian: დემეტრე (Demetre), დიმიტრი (Dimitri)
- German: Demetrius
- Modern Greek: Δημήτριος, Δημήτρης, Μήτρος, Μήτσος, Μητσάρας, Ντίμης (Dimitrios, Dimitris, Mitros, Mitsos, Mitsaras, Dimis)
- Hebrew: (Demetrius) דמיטריוס ,(Dima) דימה ,(Dmitriy) דמיטרי
- Hungarian: Dömötör
- Indonesian: Demetrius
- Italian: Demetrio
- Polish: Dymitr, Demetriusz
- Portuguese: Demétrio
- Romanian: Dumitru, Dimitrie
- Russian: Дмитрий, Митя (Dmitriy, Mitja)
- Serbian: Димитрије (Dimitrije), Дмитар (Dmitar), Митар (Mitar)
- Slovak: Demeter
- Slovene: Dimitrij, Mitja
- Spanish: Demetrio
- Turkish: Demeter
- Ukrainian: Дмитро (Dmytro)
