= Dhimitër Zografi =

Albanian politician

- Born: 1878; Korçë, Manastir Vilayet, Ottoman Empire
- Died: 1945 (aged 66–67)
- Occupation: Politician

Dhimitër Zografi (1878–1945) was one of the signatories of Albanian Declaration of Independence.

== Early life and career ==
Zografi was born in Korçë, in the Manastir Vilayet of the Ottoman Empire (present-day Albania) in 1878. At the end of the 19th century he emigrated to Romania. In 1906 he participated in founding the patriotic association of the Albanians from Bucharest "Bashkimi-Unirea". He was one of the organizers of the Albanian colony in meeting that occurred in Bucharest in early November 1912. He was elected as a delegate of the Albanian Colony in Romania to participate in the Albanian Declaration of Independence. In December 1912, along with Dhimitër Emanoili, he went to Brindisi and then to Korçë and from there to Romania. He protested the decisions of the Conference of Paris and its injustice on the Albanian people and is the organizer of the signatories of a petition against the Conference in June 1919.

He died in 1945 in Bucharest.

== Sources ==
- "History of Albanian People", Skender Anamali (Albanian Academy of Science), 2002. Volume II. ISBN 99927-1-623-1. OCLC 643986610.
