= Dimitris Drosos =

Greek businessman and football chairman

- Δρόσος Δημήτρης
- Born: 1966 (age 59–60); Patras, Greece
- Education: TEI Patras

Dimitris Drosos (Greek: Δημήτρης Δρόσος; born 1966) is a Greek businessman, owner of PAE CHANIA and the ex-chairman of AEK Athens BC and PAOK BC. He was born in Patras and began as a footballer from the juniors of Panachaiki team and moving upwards to professional football where he remained until 1985. Later he played in smaller teams as of these of Achaia, and in 1990 he was voted one of the players of the year.(PatraSpor) (Achilleas P.& Thiela P) and Pellas (Niki Aksiou & Arostotelis L.).
