= Dimitrije Bratoglić =

Painter

Dimitrije Bratoglić (Serbian Cyrillic: Димитрије Братоглић; 1765 to 1831) was a Serbian academic painter, merchant and sometime spy for Serbian insurgents at the time of the Serbian Revolution. He was born in Zemun, then part of the Austrian Empire, in late December 1764 according to the Julian Calendar which coincided with early January 1765 according to the Gregorian calendar. Bratoglić attended the Academy of Fine Arts in Vienna in the 1780s. In 1828 he was commissioned by the Serbian Orthodox Church to paint the Church of Sts. Peter and Paul at Sremski Karlovci. Bratoglić painted wall paintings on the vault, pendants and icons on the iconostasis.

The paintings on the north and south doors and the icons in the archbishop's throne of the Church of the Assumption of the Blessed Virgin Mary in Novi Sad, were painted by either Bratoglić or Mihajlo Jeftić of Sremski Karlovci.

Icons painted on the iconostasis at the Monastery of the Holy Archangel Gabriel in Zemun were credited to Bratoglić; recent research shows that the majority of the icons were painted by his assistant, Konstantin Lekić. Bratoglić did start the work due to his advanced age and poor health, he deferred the work to his son-in-law Lekić. The Zemun monastery church first served as a quarantine on the Military frontier, border of Turkey and Austria. Bratoglić often crossed over to the Turkish side to work on private commissions and when he returned immediately reported the military movements of the Turks to Serbs before and during the First Serbian Uprising

Bratoglić died in 1831, aged 67.

== Sources ==
- B. Vujović, Umetnost obnovljene Srbije: 1791–1848 (Belgrade, 1986).
