= Demetre =

- Gender: Male

Origin
- Origin: Old Greece
- Meaning: follower of Demeter
- Region of origin: Greece

Demetre is an Old Greek male name.

== Examples ==
- Demetre Chiparus
- Demetre II of Georgia
- Demetre I of Georgia
- Demetre Kantemir
- Demetre Gurieli
- Demetres Koutsavlakis
- Demetrescu-Tradem
