= Dimitris Soulas =

Greek photoreporter

Dimitris Soulas (Greek: Δημήτρης Σούλας) (born 1938), is a former Greek photojournalist. He worked as an independent photojournalist in Germany between 1967 and 1974.

Soulas was born in 1938 in Thessaloniki from a family originated from Souli. For the years 1960 to 1965, he studied economics at the Wolfgang Goethe University of Frankfurt and Sociology at the Institute for Social Research. After his studies, he began working in the marketing department of the fruit import company "Atlanta Handelsgesellschaft Harder & Co.", in Munich. In April 1967, Soulas co-founded with other Greek people living in Munich, the "Panhellenic Anti-junta Association" against the 1967-1974 military regime of Greece. Because of his participation in the anti-junta movement, he had his Greek passport withdrawn and was denied entry to the country. Also, the Greek Junta authorities exerted pressure to the company Soulas was working, which asked Soulas to quit the Anti-junta Association. After his denial to quit he was fired from his position in the company.

After his dismissal, he began working as a freelance photojournalist selling his photos to newspapers. Soon, he became an associate of the Associated Press, while newspapers of Munich assigned projects to him. During his career as a photojournalist, he worked for notable magazines of Germany, such as Stern, Quick, Neue Revue, and worked with Magnum agency.

In 1974, after the Greek Junta collapse, he returned in Greece. Estimating that photojournalism had still not matured in Greece, he decided to quit working as a professional photographer and he turned toward business and trade. In 1977 he established an import business for children's toys and subsequently worked as a marketing consultant. Now, he lives in Garmisch and Thessaloniki and works in a film documentary.

In 2004, Soulas donated his archive to the Fotomuseum of the Munich Stadtmuseum. In 2008, the Museum organized a retrospective exhibition on the work of Dimitris Soulas which was shown in many European cities.
