= Rugby league match officials =

Referees in Rugby league

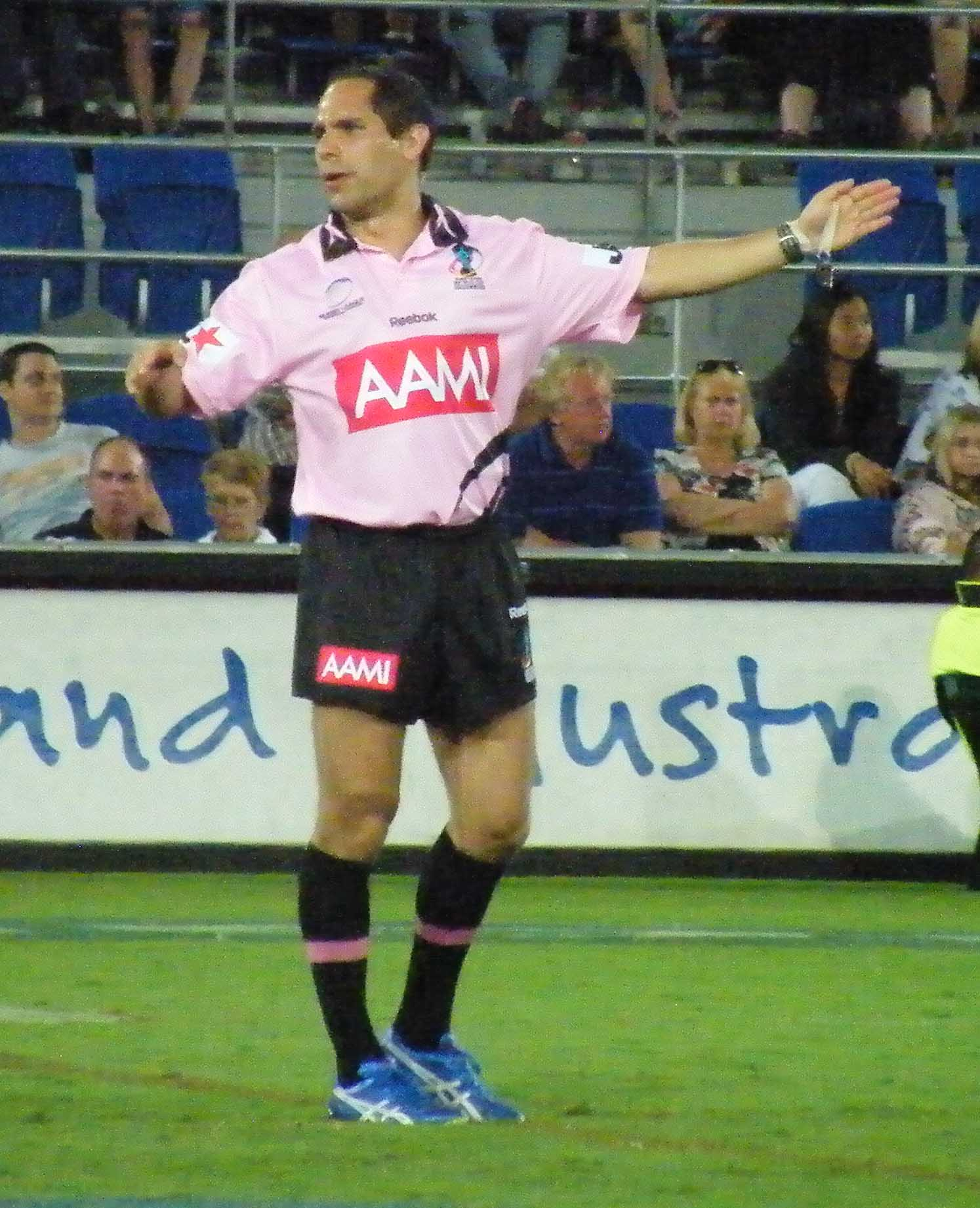
Referee Ashley Klein awards a penalty

Rugby league match officials are responsible for fairly enforcing the Laws of the Game from a neutral point of view during a match of rugby league football and imposing penalties for deliberate breaches of these Laws. The most senior match official is the referee. They may be assisted by a range of other officials depending on the level and rules of the competition.

== Equipment ==
The match officials may use the following equipment:

Coin
The referee organises a coin toss with the team captains, prior to the game commencing. To decide who kicks off and what end each team takes initially.
Whistle
Referees must carry a whistle to stop play and then signal to players about many decisions during a game. A referee will let players know when they can take a kick-off or optional kick by using his whistle, for example, as well as to stop after foul play or while awarding a try at other times in a game.
Red card
A red card is used to signal that a player is being sent from the field, or "sent off", for the rest of a match by the referee holding it aloft in the direction of that player. In some competitions such as the NRL, a red card is not used and a player is simply pointed to the touch line by the referee.

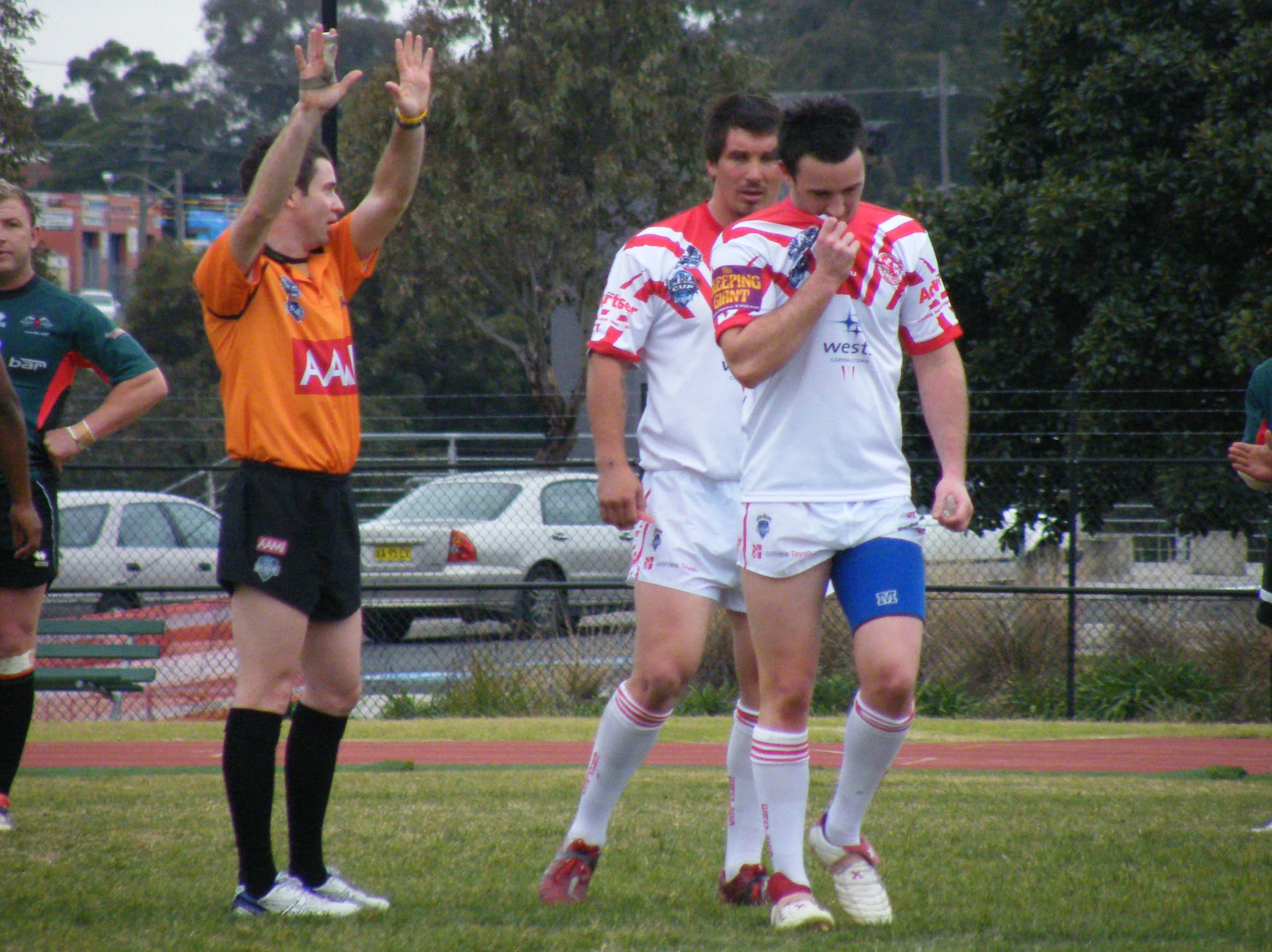
A referee sends a player to the "sin bin" for ten minutes. Spread fingers are used as the signal instead of a yellow card.

Yellow card
A yellow card is used to signal that a player is being temporarily suspended from the game. The player is sent to the "sin bin" for 10 minutes, after which time they are allowed to return to carry on playing. In some competitions such as the NRL, a yellow card is not used, instead the referee, while facing the player being disciplined, will hold out both hands with fingers and thumbs spread to represent 10 minutes.
Flag
The two touch judges each carry a flag which is used to signal certain things to both the referee and players. If the ball or the player in possession of it goes into touch the touch judge will raise their flag into the air. Touch judges hold their flags in front of them perpendicular to the touch line so that defenders know how far to retreat to be onside in situations when the referee is unable to because of other responsibilities, for example at a scrum. The flags are also waved to draw the referee's attention to incidents and are raised behind the goal posts to signal that a penalty goal or conversion attempt has been successful, or waved at waist-height to indicate an unsuccessful kick. In international and professional matches, touch judge use flags that are electronically hooked up to a receiver worn by the main referee, similar to those used in high-level soccer. By pushing a button on the flag handle, the receiver vibrates or beeps, thus drawing the referee's attention.
Microphone and earpiece
The referee, touch judges and video referee can remain in constant contact by using microphones and earpieces. The referee's microphone is broadcast as part of media match presentations.

== Uniform ==
Match officials on the playing field including the referee, touch judges and in-goal judges all wear an official uniform of a colour distinguishable from those being worn by the two sides playing each other. These uniforms have no special markings to signify the official capacity of the wearer, instead this can be identified by the positioning and equipment of the official.

== Refereeing systems ==
Different refereeing systems are in use:

Laws of the Game
A referee and two touch judges are mandated for games. A timekeeper is an optional official.
International competition
A referee, two touch judges, video referee and timekeeper.
Professional leagues
National Rugby League, Australasia: A referee, two touch judges, video referee, timekeeper.
Super League, Europe: A referee, two touch judges, video referee, reserve referee/official(s), timekeeper, match commissioner, interchange official. In-goal judges are used if the video referee is not being used for a match.

== Positions and responsibilities ==
=== Referee ===
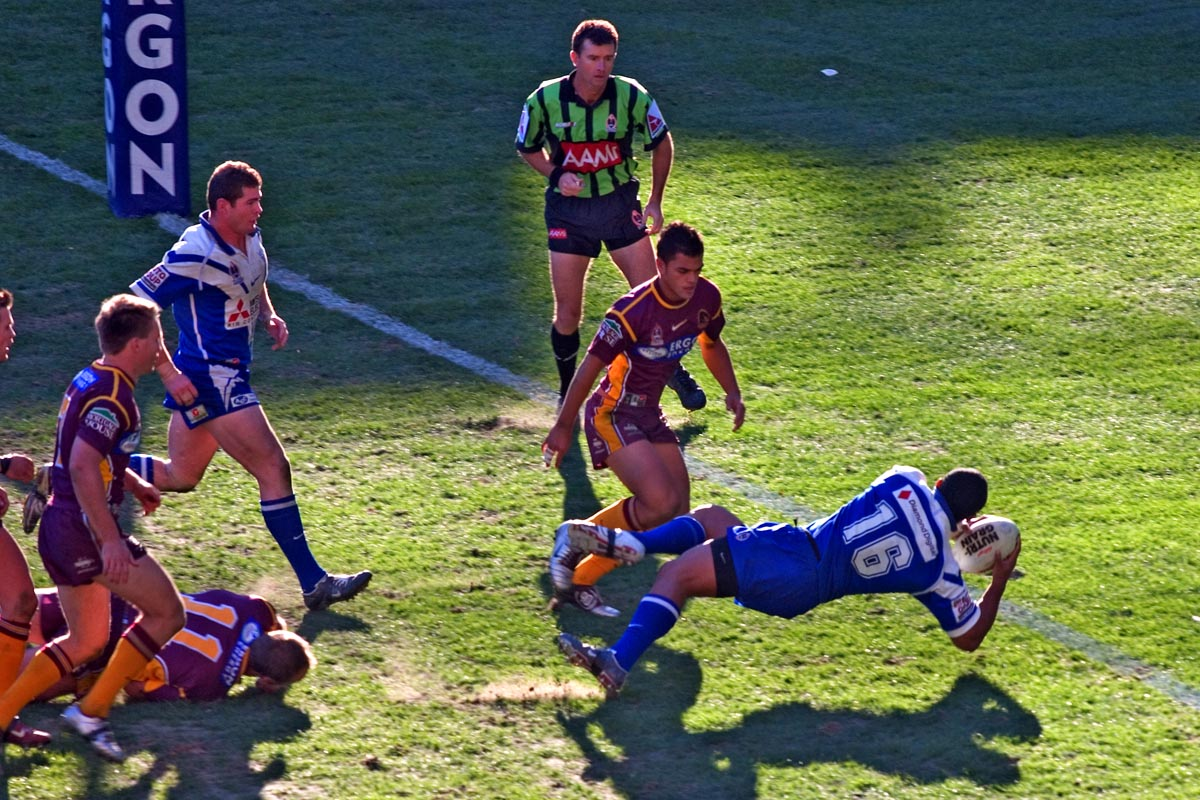
Referees must be well-sighted. Here a referee watches an attempt to score. Unsighted referees might consult with the video referee if needed.

The players of each team should be made available for kit inspection. The referee inspects the playing kit of the two teams to ensure it is within the rules, safety is the main concern. The boots worn by players can be of particular interest so as to make sure that there are no sharp edges. The strapping worn by some players has also been scrutinised.

The referee organises a coin toss with the captains of the two teams playing to decide which team kicks off and which end they play at from kick-off.

Referees may take disciplinary action from the moment they enter the playing field until the moment they leave it after they have blown their whistle to signal full-time. The referee may blow for half time and full-time when those periods have elapsed, or after hearing the hooter if responsibility has been delegated.

Potential top level referees must first pass refereeing exams set by a governing body, such as the Rugby Football League in the United Kingdom, before officiating at progressively more senior levels of the sport, gaining experience in amateur competitions and then moving onto the professional leagues where they will progress to the top if good enough. Referees need to be "very fit", with physical training being a requirement at a professional level of competition. Good communication skills, an ability to "handle top athletes with respect and authority" and being able to operate under pressure and scrutiny have been cited as by Stuart Cummings, a former referee, as skills needed to control a game.

Full-time referees have been used in the Super League professional competition since 2007.

==== Referee's signals ====
The referee having made a decision should indicate that decision by using a signal.

=== Touch judge ===
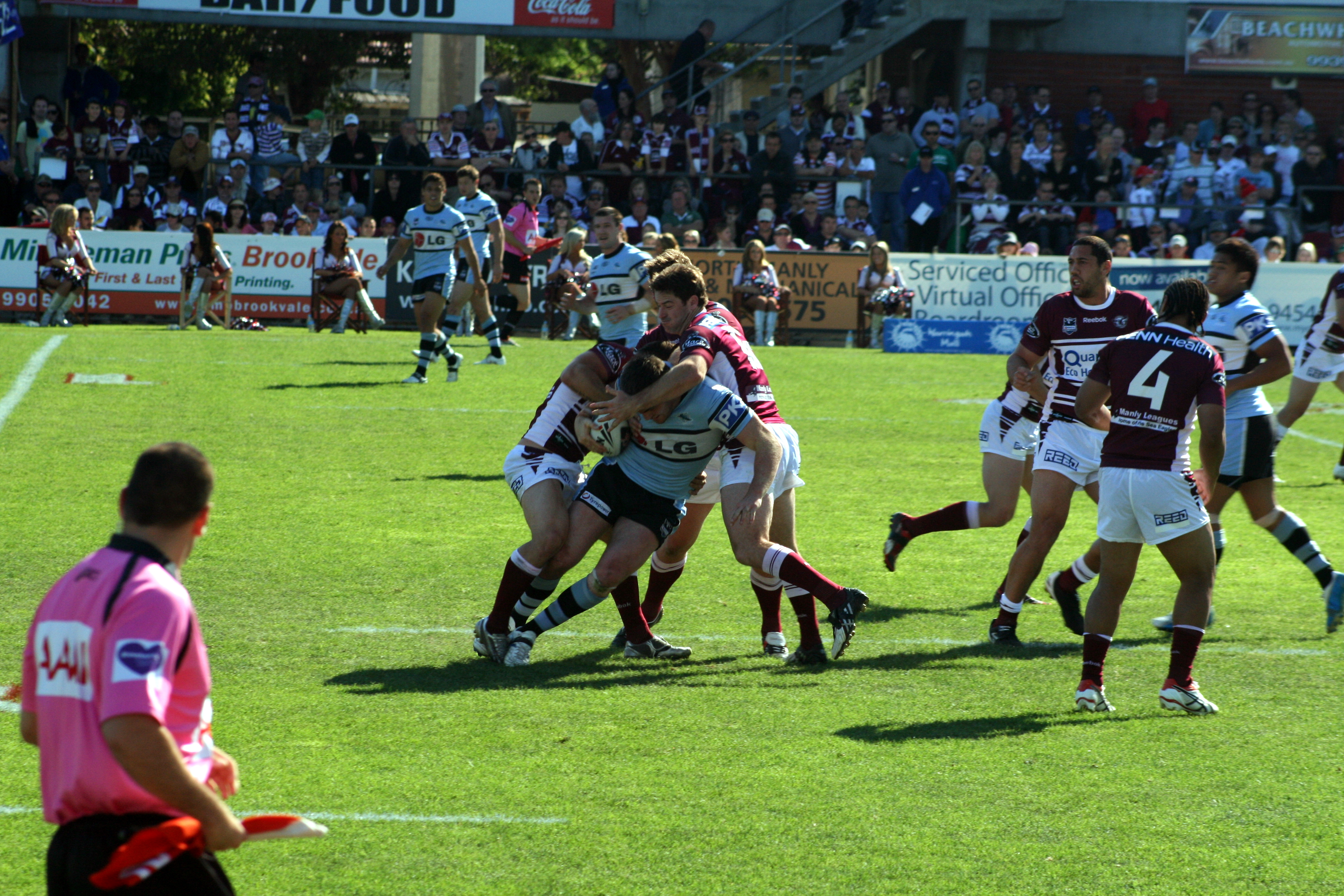
Touch judges watch play from each touchline

Two touch judges are used in a rugby league game. They move along each touch line following play. Their main function is to judge when the ball or a player carrying the ball has gone into touch. They also stand together behind the goal posts to judge whether conversions or penalty kicks at goal have been successful.

==== Touch judges' signals ====
The touch judges cannot stop play but can signal the referee to enable them to assist the referee.

=== Video referee ===
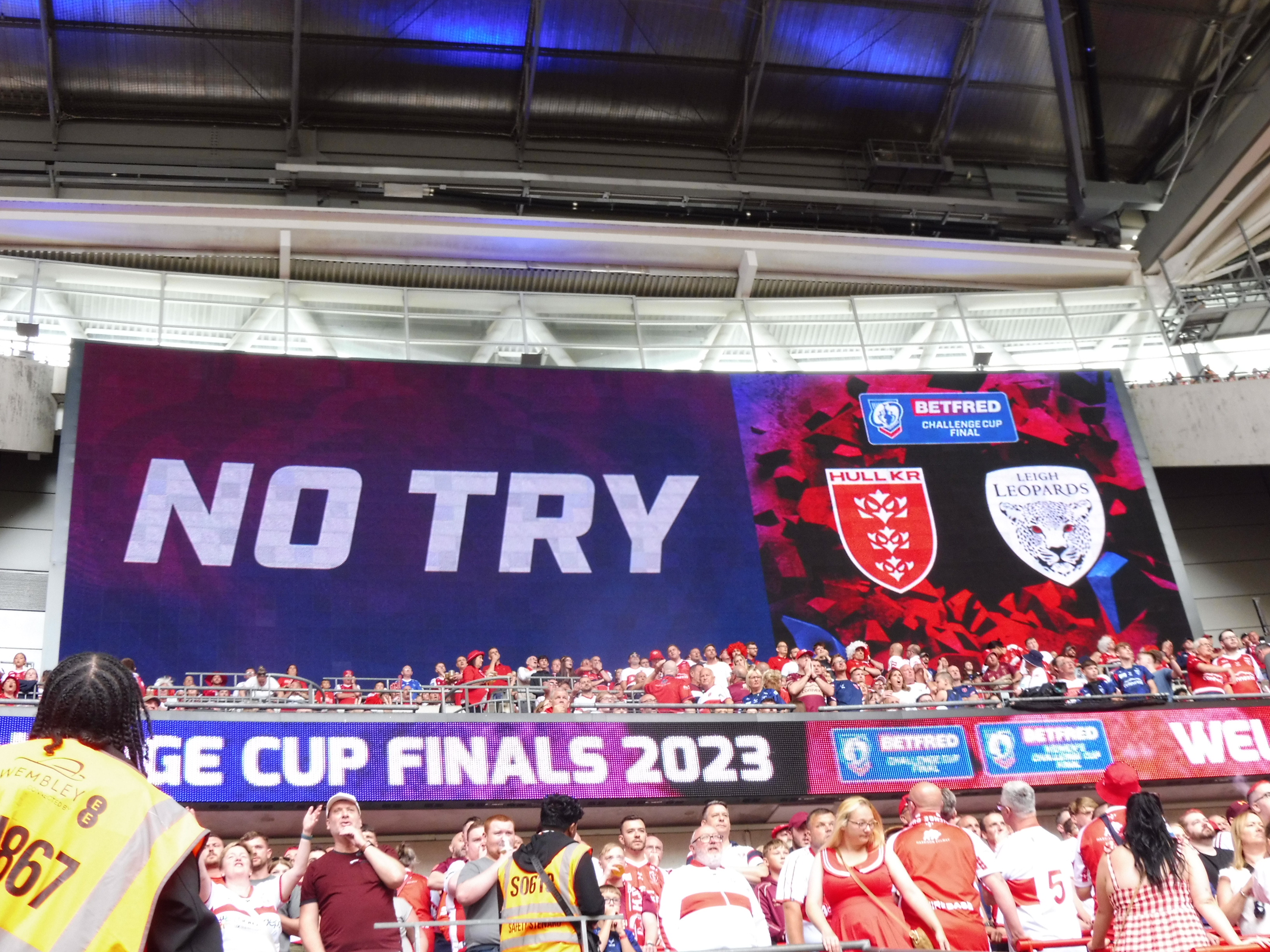
The screen is used to signal the video referee's decisions. Unlike other sports, the video screen in the venue makes the announcement, not the referee.

The video referee may be called upon by the referee to examine the play in possible tries. In the Super League competition they can examine play from the preceding play-the-ball. A video referee may also be asked to check whether an attempted 40-20 kick has been successful and sometimes called upon by the referee if there is a stoppage to check events before making a decision. Once a decision has been made by the on field referee, the video referee may not overrule it.

The video referee was first seen in Australia at the 1996 Super League World Nines. The use of the video referee has led to new rule interpretations. In Northern Hemisphere competitions, the video referee is stationed at the ground itself, usually in either the TV production truck or a special booth inside the stadium, while in the NRL a group of video referees make decisions on all matches from "The Bunker", a specially-constructed facility near league headquarters in Sydney modeled after similar instant-replay rooms used by American sports leagues like MLB or the NHL.

=== In-goal judge ===
In-goal judges may be used if no video referee system is present at a match to assist the referee in his decision making.

=== Timekeeper ===
The referee shall keep the time during a game unless this responsibility is delegated to an appointed official. Delegation of responsibility is usually decided by the rules of a competition, it is standard practice for professional competitions to use an appointed official in place of the referee.

The British Rugby Football League's Operational Rules, for example, require the home team to provide a timekeeper for first team games with the away team being entitled to bring their own to sit alongside their opponent's representative. The timekeepers signal half time and full-time as well as extra time periods if they are played. When time has expired the timekeepers sound the hooter, at this signal the referee will blow his whistle to end play at an existing stoppage or wait for the next one to occur.

A referee can signal by raising both arms to a timekeeper to take account of stoppage time and to stop their watch until signalled again by waving one arm above their head to carry on timing.

A timekeeper may be used to assist the referee in timing the temporary suspension (sin bin) of a player.

=== Match Commissioner ===
The Match Commissioner is responsible for the whole game. They ensure the game kicks off on time and any incidents that may arise are brought to the attention of the Rugby Football League. This is an essential role as it allows the game to run consistently without any interruptions

=== Interchange Official ===
The Interchange Official ensures that the interchange process is carried out smoothly and legally. No interchange can take place without the Interchange Official present. Usually, the Interchange Official will be responsible for the home team's interchange and the Reserve Referee/Official will be responsible for the away team's interchange.

== See also ==
- Touch match officials
- NRL match officials
- RFL match officials
