= Dimitris Poulianos =

Greek artist (1899–1972)

Dimitris Poulianos (17 April 1899 in Ikaria, Greece - 7 September 1972 in Athens, Greece) was a Greek artist responsible for creating a large body of oil paintings and charcoal drawings that continue to hold value amongst private collectors and prominent, international galleries. Poulianos trained at the Athens School of Fine Arts with Georgiou Roilo in 1923 and then 1924–28 at the Académie Julian in Paris where he was awarded the Smit prize. In 1931, he was awarded an MA in art from Columbia University, New York. He was known for "living and breathing his art" and never took a wife. His work is characterized by turbulent, expressionistic outdoor scenes with a particular love for the sea and night sky. Exhibitions were offered to him early in his career at galleries in Athens, Paris and New York which has generated a strong interest in his work by collectors around the world. A book covering his work has recently been published by ikarianstudies.org in 2008 as a result of extensive research undertaken by Petros Themeles, with cooperation from the children of his nephews, Constantinos and Aris Poulianos and others amongst the remaining relatives, personal friends and collectors who retain his original work.
