= RFL match officials =

Professional officials in British rugby league

The RFL Match Officials are a select group of professional Rugby League match officials who officiate the top divisions of Rugby League in Britain.

Officials are required to take part in a Fitness Test to maintain and or gain their status.

== Match Official Department Staff ==
Phil Bentham was re-appointed as the RFL's Head of Match Officials in February 2024. He previously held this post on an interim basis between Jan-March 2021 while Steve Ganson was on leave.

Dave Elliot served as the interim Head of Match Officials between Jan-Dec 2023 while an internal investigation took place into the department, ran by Steve Ganson from 2016. This concluded with Ganson leaving the RFL by mutual consent in December 2023.

Name	Position
Phil Bentham	Head of Match Officials
Julian King	Grade 1 Referee Group Manager
Chris Kendall	Grade 1 Referee Group Coach
Tom Grant	Grade 1 Referee Group Coach
Andrew Smith	Grade 1 & 2 Touch Judge Coach
Ben Thaler	Match Official Recruitment and Development Manager
Marcus Griffiths	Women's Super League Squad Manager
Ryan Cox	Match Officials Operations Manager
Matty Lynn	Match Officials Administrator

== Graded Match Officials ==
To become an Elite match official, Grade 1 officials must have an interview with the Head of Match Officials.

Grading	Referee	Touch Judge
Grade 1	Super League, Championship and League 1	Super League
Grade 2	Academy and Reserves	Championship & League 1
Grade 3	National Conference League & Scholarship	Academy & Reserves

== Elite Referees (RFL Full Time Match Officials) ==
Since the 2007 season, the Rugby Football League have employed a panel of full-time officials. That panel currently has nine members.

=== Current Full Time Match Officials Squad ===
Managed by Phil Bentham.

Name	Society	Age	Year Appointed
(England) Aaron Moore	Wigan	28 years, 325 days	2023
(England) Chris Kendall	Huddersfield	34 years, 124 days	2015
(England) Jack Smith	Wigan	37 years, 231 days	2022
(England) Liam Moore	Wigan	31 years, 99 days	2017
(England) Tara Jones	Warrington	30 years, 87 days	2025
(England) Tom Grant	Leeds	32 years, 89 days	2018
(England) Marcus Griffiths	Widnes	32 years, 142 days	2019
(England) Liam Rush	Dewsbury & Batley	26 years, 109 days	2022
(Australia) James Vella	St George Referees (Sydney, Australia)	37 years, 121 days	2022

=== Previous Full Time Match Officials ===
Name	Society	Start	End	Total
(England) Ben Thaler	Mid Yorkshire	2005	2024	19 years
(England) James Child	Dewsbury & Batley	2010	2022	12 years
(England) Cameron Worsley	Mid Yorkshire			
(England) Robert Hicks	Oldham			
(England) Scott Mikalauskas	Leigh		2021	
(England) Greg Dolan				
(England) Phil Bentham	Warrington			
(France) Thierry Alibert				
(England) Joe Cobb	Widnes			
(England) Chris Campbell	Widnes			
(England) Steve Ganson	St Helens			
(England) George Stokes	St Helens			
(England) Ian Smith	Oldham			
(England) Richard Silverwood	Dewsbury & Batley			
(Australia) Ashley Klein	Leeds			

== Elite Touch Judges (Super League) ==
Managed by Dave Elliot. By default the RFL Full Time Match Officials are graded as Elite Touch Judges.

Name	Society	Name	Society		
Denton Arnold	St Helens	Tom Grant	Leeds		
Nick Bennett	Dewsbury & Batley	Marcus Griffiths	Widnes		
Dean Bowmer	Mid Yorkshire	Chris Kendall	Huddersfield		
Peter Brooke	Manchester	Aaron Moore	Wigan		
Ryan Cox	St Helens	Liam Moore	Wigan		
Mark Craven	Leeds	Liam Rush	Dewsbury & Batley		
Simon Ellis	Dewsbury & Batley	Jack Smith	Wigan		
Neil Horton	Mid Yorkshire	Tara Jones	Warrington		
Gareth Jones	Warrington	James Vella	St George Referees (Sydney, Australia)		
Paul Marklove	Warrington	Matty Lynn	Warrington		
Ellis McCarthy	St Helens				
Scott Mikalauskas	Leigh				
Jonathon Roberts	Leeds				
Richard Thompson	Hull				
Warren Turley	Leigh				
Cameron Worsley	Mid Yorkshire				
Alex Cameron	Huddersfield			Total Count = 25. Part Time = 16.	Full Time = 9.

== Grade 1 Match Officials ==
=== Select Referees ===
Managed by Julian King & Chris Kendall.

Name	Society	Name	Society
Denton Arnold	St Helens	Sam Jenkinson	Mid Yorkshire
Aaryn Belafonte	Huddersfield	Freddie Lincoln	Huddersfield
Nick Bennett	Dewsbury & Batley	Matty Lynn	Warrington
Alan Billington	Widnes	Scott Mikalauskas	Leigh
Luke Bland	Leeds	Bradley Milligan	Cumberland
Elliot Burrow	Barrow	Kevin Moore	Mid Yorkshire
Matty Clayton	Huddersfield	Michael Smaill	Leigh
Ryan Cox	St Helens	Andy Sweet	Mid Yorkshire
Will Gilder	Midlands & South West	Adam Williams	Wigan
Sam Houghton	Manchester	Cameron Worsley	Mid Yorkshire
Carl Hughes	Mid Yorkshire	Kristoff Young	Wales
Jordan Hughes	Barrow		
Total Count = 23.

=== Select Touch Judges ===
Managed by Steve Williams.

Name	Society	Name	Society
Aaryn Belafonte	Huddersfield	Matty Lynn	Warrington
Alan Billington	Widnes	Ollie Maddock	Warrington
Luke Bland	Leeds	Milo McKelvey	Huddersfield
Ben Brocklehurst	Mid Yorkshire	Bradley Milligan	Cumberland
Elliot Burrow	Barrow	Kevin Moore	Mid Yorkshire
Jamie Callaghan	St Helens	Lewis O'brien	Wigan
Alex Cameron	Huddersfield	Josh Pemberton	Warrington
Matty Clayton	Huddersfield	Oliver Salmon	Huddersfield
James Collier	Manchester	Lucas Seal	Barrow
James Collins	Midlands & South West	Gary Shaw	Wigan
Luke Flavell	Wigan	Joe Stearne	Mid Yorkshire
Tommy Gibbs	Mid Yorkshire	Andy Sweet	Mid Yorkshire
Will Gilder	Midlands & South West	Adrian Tallon	Hull
Aaron Giles	Barrow	Jordan Unsworth	Leigh
Sam Houghton	Manchester	Adam Williams	Wigan
Carl Hughes	Mid Yorkshire	Gareth Winnard	London & The South
Jordan Hughes	Barrow	Henry Winnard	London & The South
Sam Jenkinson	Mid Yorkshire	Peter Wroe	Midlands & South West
Tara Jones	Warrington	Kristoff Young	Wales
Freddie Lincoln	Huddersfield		
Total Count = 39.

== Grade 2 Match Officials ==
=== Emerging Referees ===
Managed by Tom Grant.

Name	Society	Name	Society	Name	Society	Name	Society
Tolver Arnold	St Helens	C Curren		Alex McDonald	Midlands & South West	Pete Smith	Armed Forces
Mason Apsee	Wales	Craig Davies	Wales	Milo McKelvey	Huddersfield	Joe Stearne	Mid Yorkshire
Jack Bacon	Wigan	Simon Ellis	Dewsbury & Batley	Ryan Mitchell	Dewsbury & Batley	Adrian Tallon	Hull
Dylan Barlow	Wigan	Luke Flavell	Wigan	Lewis O'brien	Wigan	Warren Turley	Leigh
Oliver Bowie	Mid Yorkshire	Tommy Gibbs	Mid Yorkshire	Guy Pallet	Armed Forces	Gareth Winnard	London & The South
Dean Bowmer	Mid Yorkshire	Aaron Giles	Barrow	Neil Pascall	Leeds	Henry Winnard	London & The South
Ben Brocklehurst	Mid Yorkshire	Connor Griffiths	Warrington	Josh Pemberton	Warrington	Brandon Worsley	Mid Yorkshire
Feargus Brown	York	Neil Horton	Mid Yorkshire	Craig Regan	Barrow		
Jamie Callaghan	St Helens	Owen Ireland	Warrington	Aidan Rhodes	Leeds		
Alex Cameron	Huddersfield	Josh Kinsley	Hull	Oliver Salmon	Huddersfield		
James Collier	Manchester	Danny Krout	London & The South	Reece Schofield	Manchester		
James Collins	Midlands & South West	Phil Loeb	Warrington	Lucas Seal	Barrow		
Matt Cowan	London & The South	Ollie Maddock	Warrington	Gary Shaw	Wigan		
Anthony Creasey	London & The South	Paul Marklove	Warrington	Kristian Silcock	St Helens		
Total Count = 49

=== Emerging Touch Judges ===
Managed by Ryan Cox.

Name	Society	Name	Society	Name	Society
Mason Apsee	Wales	Danny Frederick	Hull	Kieran O'Shea	London & South
Rob Apsee	Wales	Dan Geddes	Mid Yorkshire	Guy Pallet	Armed Forces
Innes Arnold	St Helens	Jordan Greenhalgh	Widnes	Neil Pascall	Leeds
Tolver Arnold	St Helens	Connor Griffiths	Warrington	Shaun Pickering	St Helens
Jack Bacon	Wigan	Lee Haggerty	St Helens	Simeon Quarmby	Huddersfield
Dylan Barlow	Wigan	Shea Harrison	Wigan	Craig Regan	Barrow
Ronan Bird	Widnes	Ryan Holmes	Dewsbury & Batley	Rhiece Rhodes	Huddersfield
Oliver Bowie	Mid-Yorkshire	Jamie Hooper	Mid-Yorkshire	Reece Schofield	Manchester
Liam Breheny	Wigan	Rhiannon Horsman	Leeds	S Shea	
F Brown		Owen Ireland	Warrington	Kristian Silcock	St Helens
Paul Clayton	Mid Yorkshire	Liam Jones	St Helens	Adam Smith	Huddersfield
Lewis Corcoran	Wigan	Josh Kinsley	Hull	Pete Smith	Armed Forces
Andrew Coupar	St Helens	Danny Krout	London & South	B Thomas	
Matt Cowan	London & South	K Lewis		C Topping	
George Cox	Hull	Phil Loeb	Warrington	Tyler Topping-Higson	Wigan
Ian Curzon	Wales	Andy Marsh	Wigan	Rebecca Whiteley	Huddersfield
C Davies		Megan Mills	Hull	A Woods	
Rebecca Floyd	St Helens	R Mithchell		Jack Woolass	Hull
Harry Forster	Huddersfield	Mia Murphy	Leigh	Brandon Worsley	Mid Yorkshire
Stuart Fraser	St Helens	Beth Neilson	Huddersfield	Esmai Wright	Warrington
Total Count = 60.

== Grade 3 Match Officials ==
=== Entry Referees ===
Managed by Tom Grant.

Name	Society	Name	Society	Name	Society
Anthony Atherton	Wigan	Harry Forster	Huddersfield	Logan Miles	Dewsbury & Batley
T Bell		Jordan Greenhalgh	Widnes	M Mills	
Jake Berry	Widnes	Liam Grundy	Dewsbury & Batley	Andrew Mulligan	St Helens
Ronan Bird	Leigh	Lee Haggerty	St Helens	Mia Murphy	Leigh
Matty Bolton	Barrow	S Harrison		Robbie Nevinson	Barrow
N Bragg		Andy Hawley	Warrington	Tom Prescott	St Helens
Liam Breheny	Wigan	Joby Hewitt	Mid Yorkshire	Shaun Pickering	St Helens
Micky Brighton	London & The South	Ryan Holmes	Dewsbury & Batley	Sam Price	Wigan
Dan Brown	Mid-Yorkshire	Jamie Hooper	Mid Yorkshire	Simeon Quarmby	Huddersfield
I Carson	Leigh	Rhiannon Horsman	Leeds	R Rhodes	
Steve Cockram	St Helens	S Powell		Matt Roberts	Bradford & Halifax
L Corcoran		Liam Jones	St Helens	Dan Saunders	Leeds
Andrew Coupar	St Helens	Naz Khan	Warrington	Adam Smith	Huddersfield
George Cox	Hull	Dylan Kindelan	Dewsbury & Batley	Dave Swindlehurst	Wigan
Lucas Dabbs	Leigh	Alex Leaf	Leeds	Tyler Topping-Higson	Wigan
J Davey		C MacDonald		Erin Watson	Huddersfield
F Evans		Andy Marsh	Wigan	A Woods	
J Evans		Matthew Martin	Mid-Yorkshire	Jack Woolass	Hull
O Filer		Ross McCarthy	St Helens	Esmai Wright	Warrington
Rebecca Floyd	St Helens	Callum Murphy	Wigan		
Total Count = 59.

=== Entry Touch Judges ===
Managed by Ryan Cox.

Name	Society	Name	Society	Name	Society
Anthony Atherton	Wigan	Joby Hewitt	Mid Yorkshire	Adrian Tallon	Hull
T Bell		Naz Khan	Warrington	B Thomas	
J Berry		Dylan Kindelan	Dewsbury & Batley	Erin Watson	Huddersfield
M Bolton		Chris Lawson	London & The South	A Woods	
Kyle Bonsor	Midlands & South West	A Leaf			
N Bragg		C MacDonald			
Dan Brown	Mid Yorkshire	M Martin			
I Carson	Leigh	Ross McCarthy	St Helens		
Steve Cockram	St Helens	Logan Miles	Dewsbury & Batley		
Lewis Collins	Midlands & South West	Callum Murphy	Wigan		
Lucas Dabbs	Leigh	R Nevinson			
J Davey		S Powell			
F Evans		Tom Prescott			
O Filer		Sam Price	Wigan		
O Foulkes		Joe Raddings	Midlands & South West		
J Foxon		Matt Roberts	Huddersfield		
Cameron Gray	London & The South	D Saunders			
Liam Grundy	Dewsbury & Batley	Paul Strafford	Leeds		
Andy Hawley	Warrington	Dave Swindlehurst	Wigan		
Total Count = 44.

== Kit suppliers and sponsors ==
Period	Manufacturers	Sponsors
2003-2006	Patrick	Powergen
2007	Patrick	Engage
2008-2009	Puma	Engage
2010-2012	ISC	Engage
2013	ISC	none
2014	ISC	Specsavers
2015-2017	BLK	Specsavers
2018	Hummel	Specsavers
2019-2020	Hummel	Ronseal
2021-2026	Oxen	Ronseal

== See also ==
- NRL match officials
- Super League
- Rugby Football League
