= Dimitri (disambiguation) =

Dimitri is a given name and a surname.

Dimitri/Dimitry may also refer to:

- Dimitri (Joncières), 1876 French opera
- Codename for the video game Project Milo
- Dimitri Peak

== See also ==
- Dmitry
- Dimitrije
- Dmytro
