= Dimitris Voyatzis =

Greek film director

Dimitris Voyatzis (Greek: Δημήτρης Βογιατζής), born Dimitrios Voyatzis, was a Greek film director, actor, producer, editor, a screenwriter and a folk musician.

== His films ==
His films include: Hobby mou... o Viasmos (My hobbies include... Rape), O Skyllas (The Dog-man), I Lires tou Antarti (The Guerrilla's billions) (Italics indicate a romanization of the Greek title, while parentheses indicate a literal translation into English).

The films were produced with low budget values and intended for public screening in northern Greek cafés owned by his acquaintances. The lead characters were typically marginalized, flawed, or outside the law, pursuing goals such as redemption, atonement, or love. Other characters were portrayed as vengeful figures seeking personal satisfaction. The stories featured individuals living in decaying urban environments under public suspicion, facing antagonists and corrupt authorities. Featuring ex-convicts, rapists, and smugglers, these anti-hero figures opposed hostile antagonists or their own internal struggles. The themes, plots, and characters share structural similarities with transgressive fiction.

In two out of his three (O Skyllas & Hobby mou...) directed feature films, he co-starred with the Greek cult actor Kostas Stefanakis.

Since his films were not released for the video market, they have always been difficult to track. His films were later released through the Greek video label Onar films.

== His life ==
According to his close associate Tasos Aggelopoulos, he wasn't working; his income and funds for his films came from his wealthy family. As a folk musician, he played with bands in fairs around Greece. He never married, nor had children. This information, however, does not seem credible, as Dimitri Voyatzis' son, George Voyiatzis, appears on his film, "O Skyllas" and also on the title of his film company.

== Lary-Skot productions ==
With Mr. Aggelopoulos, they founded the film company Lary-Skot productions (a.k.a. Larry Scott video production, a reference to the American bodybuilder Larry Scott) and through it produced and "released" his films. Other productions of Lary-Skot productions include the film O Fotografos kai ta manoulia tou (The photographer and his babes) and O Videoclubas (The Video rental Guy). Lary-Skot productions was located in Pagrati, in Athens, Greece. After his death, the company passed to Mr. Aggelopoulos, a wedding videographer at the time of the film productions and currently an electrician, who worked with Mr. Voyatzis as a cinematographer, a co-director, a gaffer and a boom operator. Mr. Aggelopoulos considers Voyatzis's films garbage and admits that he has lost any negatives and film copies of the Lary-Skot films.

== A Dimitris Voyatzis renaissance ==
While it has been several years since Mr. Voyatzis's death, due to screenings in Greek cult film festivals, his films started reaching new audiences and have become more popular than ever.
