= Dimitrije Dimitrijević (footballer) =

Yugoslav footballer (1903–1984)

Personal information
- Date of birth: 1903
- Place of birth: Sarajevo, Condominium of Bosnia and Herzegovina, Austria-Hungary
- Date of death: 1984 (aged 80–81)
- Place of death: Sarajevo, SR Bosnia and Herzegovina, SFR Yugoslavia

Senior career*
| Years | Team | Apps | (Gls) |
| 1921 | Željezničar | 1+ | (1) |
- * Club domestic league appearances and goals

Dimitrije Dimitrijević (1903–1984) was a Yugoslav footballer who played between two world wars. He was one of the founders of prominent Bosnian club FK Željezničar and scorer of the club's first ever goal.

Like all the other founders of FK Željezničar, Dimitrijević worked as a railway worker in his hometown Sarajevo. It was his idea to form a football club as a way of recreation in 1921. Željezničar played its first game on 17 September 1921 against SAŠK Sarajevo, losing 5–1. Dimitrijević scored the only Željezničar goal of the game.

== Personal life ==
Born in 1903 in Sarajevo, Austro-Hungarian occupied Bosnia and Herzegovina, Dimitrijević was a steam train driver, operating from Sarajevo to the town of Višegrad. He had 5 brothers. His mother Efrosina and father Kostas were ethnic Greeks. Dimitrijević's mother came from a family called Makridis from Athens, while his father changed his name upon emigration.

== Death ==
Dimitrijević died in Sarajevo in September 1984 and is buried at Bare Cemetery.
