= Cyril Dimon =

Australian rugby league referee

Personal information
- Full name: Cyril Joseph Dimon
- Died: 4 January 2005 (aged 84)

Refereeing information
Years	Competition	Apps
1961–1962	New South Wales Rugby League	9
- Source: rugbyleagueproject.org

Cyril Dimon (died 4 January 2005) was an Australian rugby league referee. Dimon began his refereeing career in the Newtown District Junior Rugby League. He was subsequently graded to referee in the New South Wales Rugby League (NSWRL). He refereed nine first grade matches in 1961–1962. In his first game of 1962, Dimon was criticised by the players for the large number of scrum penalties. Dimon dismissed both hookers from the game. In 1963 Dimon, by then a touch judge, took over a first grade match from Col Pearce when Pearce damaged a knee tendon.

In July 1963, Dimon was a touch judge in the Test match between South Africa and Australia.
