= Dmitry =

Orthodox Christian masculine name

Dmitri
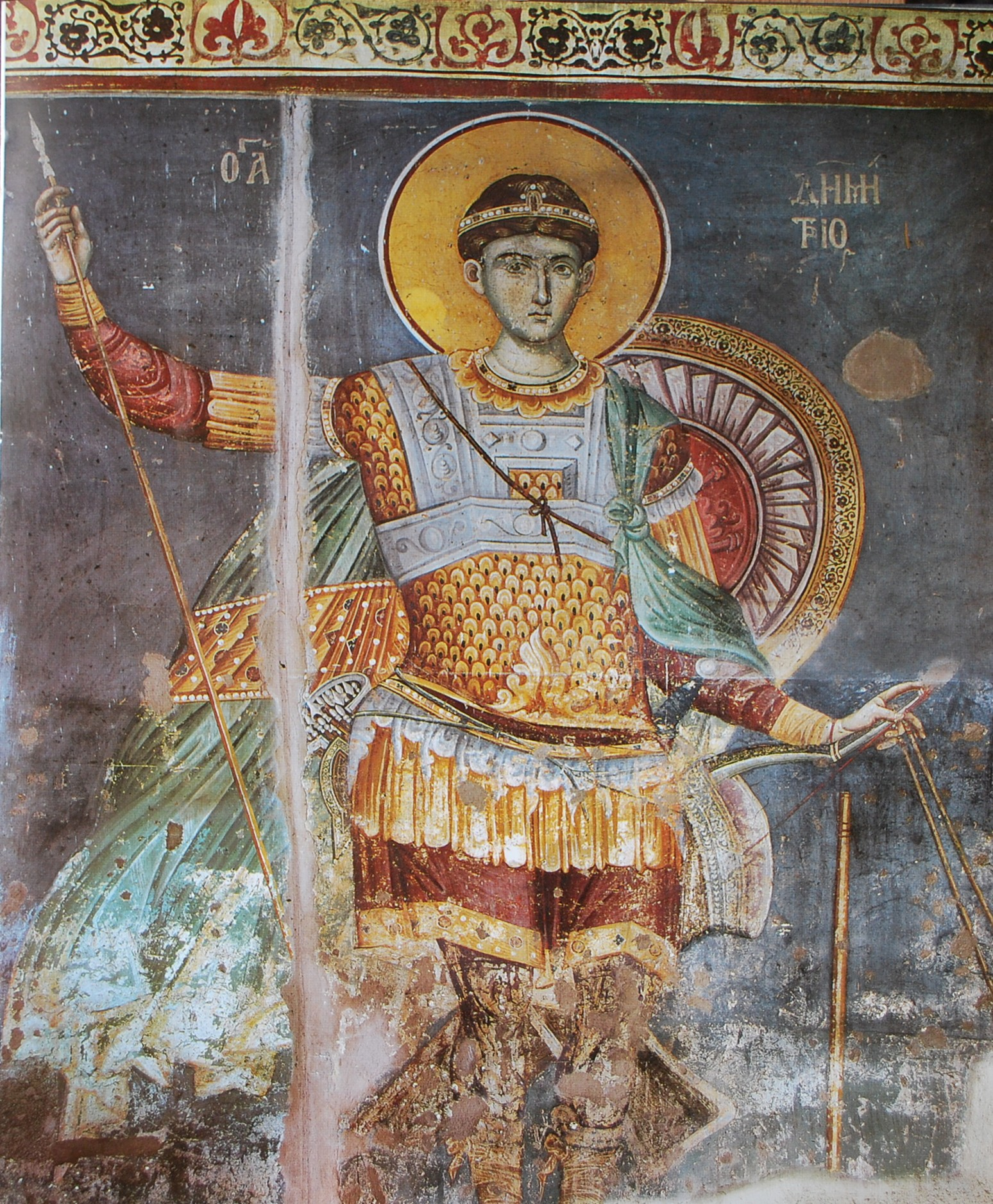
- Demetrius of Thessaloniki
- Pronunciation: Russian: [ˈdmʲitrʲɪj]
- Gender: Male
- Language: Slavic

Origin
- Origin: Greek Demetrius
- Meaning: "devoted/dedicated to Demeter"
- Region of origin: Ancient Greece

Other names
- Alternative spelling: Dmitry, Dmitri, Dmitrii, Dmitriy, Dimtri, Dimitry, Dmitry, Demitri, Dmitrij, Dimitri, Demetri, Dimietri, Dimitrii, Demitri, Demitri, Demetrie, Dimitrie
- Variant forms: Dimitry, Dimitri
- Nicknames: Dima, Mitya, Jim, Jimmy, Jimmie, Dimmie, Demmie, Mimmie, Metry, Metrie, Jimbo, Mimi, Mitry, Mitrie, Demi, Dimi, Demmy, Dimmy
- Related names: Demetrius, Demetria, Demetrios, Demeter, Demetra, Demi, Dimitrije, Dimitris, Dimitar, Dmytro, Mitar
- Popularity: see popular names

Dmitry (Russian: Дми́трий; Church Slavic form: Dimitry or Dimitri (Дими́трий); ancient Russian forms: D'mitriy or Dmitr (Дьмитр(ии) or Дъмитръ)) is a male given name common in Orthodox Christian culture, the Russian version of Demetrios (Greek: Δημήτριος, romanized: Dēmḗtrios, Greek pronunciation: [ðiˈmitrios]). The meaning of the name is "devoted to, dedicated to, or follower of Demeter" (Δημήτηρ, Dēmētēr), "mother-earth", the Greek goddess of agriculture.

Short forms of the name from the 13th–14th centuries are Mit, Mitya, Mityay, Mit'ka or Miten'ka (Мить, Ми́тя, Митя́й, Ми́тька, or Ми́тенька); from the 20th century (originated from the Church Slavic form) are Dima, Dimka, Dimochka, Dimulya, Dimusha, Dimon etc. (Ди́ма, Ди́мка, Ди́мочка, Диму́ля, Диму́ша, Димон, etc.)

== St. Dimitri's Day ==
The feast of the martyr Saint Demetrius of Thessalonica is celebrated on Saturday before November 8 [Old Style: October 26].

The name day (именины): October 26 (November 8 on the Julian Calendar) See also: Eastern Orthodox liturgical calendar. The Saturday before this is called Demetrius Saturday and commemorates the Orthodox soldiers who fell in the 1380 Battle of Kulikovo.

== Notable people with the name ==
=== Pre-late modern period ===
- Dmitry Donskoy (1350–1389), Grand Prince of Muscovy
- Dmitry of Pereslavl (1250–1294), Grand Prince of Vladimir-Suzdal
- Dmitry Pozharsky (1577–1642), Russian prince and military leader
- Dmitry of Suzdal (1324–1383), Prince of Suzdal and Nizhny Novgorod
- Dmitry of Tver (1299–1326), nicknamed "The Fearsome Eyes"
- Dmitry of Uglich (Tsarevich Dmitry Ivanovich of Russia) (1582–1591), the youngest son of Ivan the Terrible
  Later impostors claimed to be this son:
  - False Dmitry I (Grigory Otrepyev), appeared 1605–1606
  - False Dmitry II, appeared 1607–1610
  - False Dmitry III, appeared 1611–1612

=== Late modern period (from 1800) ===
- Dmitry Abakumov (born 1989), Russian football goalkeeper
- Dmitry Abanin (born 1980), Soviet-born Israeli curler
- Dmitry Abramenkov (born 1947), Russian politician
- Dmitry Abramovitch (born 1982), Russian bobsledder
- Dmitri Afanasenkov (born 1980), Russian ice hockey player
- Dmitri Agaptsev (born 1991), Russian football forward
- Dmitry Ageyev (1911–1997), Soviet radio engineer
- Dmitry Akhba (born 1985), Russian football forward
- Dmitri Akimov (1980–2026), Russian football forward
- Dmitri Akishin (born 1992), Russian ice hockey defenseman
- Dmitry Aleksandriysky (born 1968), Russian football coach
- Dmitri Aleksandrov (born 2006), Russian football midfielder
- Dmitri Alekseyev (1973–2025), Russian football goalkeeper
- Dmitri Alenichev (born 1972), Russian football player
- Dmitriy Alexanin (born 1991), Kazakh fencer
- Dmitri Alexeev (born 1947), Russo-Soviet pianist
- Dmitri Aliev (born 1999), Russian figure skater
- Dmitry Alimov (born 1974), Soviet-born American entrepreneuer
- Dmitry Aliseyko (born 1992), Belarusian football defender
- Dmitri Alperovitch (born 1980), Soviet-born American businessman
- Dmitry An (1939–2018), Soviet-Uzbek footballer
- Dmitri Ananko (born 1973), Russian football coach and player
- Dmitry Ananyev (born 1969), Russian politician and senator
- Dmitry Andreikin (born 1990), Russian chess grandmaster
- Dmitri Andreyev (born 1980), Russian football official
- Dmitri Anosov (1936–2014), Russo-Soviet mathematician
- Dmitry Antilevsky (born 1997), Belarusian football forward
- Dmitry Anuchin (1843–1923), Russian anthropographer and geologist
- Dmitry Apanasenko (born 1967), Soviet water polo player
- Dmitri Arapov (born 1993), Russian football goalkeeper
- Dmitri Arhip (born 1988), Moldovan rugby union player
- Dmitry Arkhipov (ice hockey) (born 1993), Russian ice hockey player
- Dmitry Arkhipov (skier) (born 1981), Russian freestyle skier
- Dmitry Arsenyev, Russian pogo stick athlete
- Dmitry Arsenyuk (born 1995), Russian ice hockey player
- Dmitri Arslanov (born 1990), Russian football midfielder
- Dmitry Artyukhov (born 1988), Russian politician
- Dmitry Asnin (born 1984), Belarusian football goalkeeper
- Dmitri Astakhov (born 1986), Russian footballer
- Dmitry Astrakhan (born 1957), Russian film director
- Dmitry Avaliani (1938–2003), Soviet poet
- Dmitry Averkiyev (1836–1905), Russian playwright
- Dmitry Averov (born 1974), Russian politician
- Dmitri Avramenko (born 1992), Russian football forward
- Dmitry Ayatskov (born 1950), Russian politician
- Dmitry Aydov (born 1982), Russian football defender
- Dmitry Aynalov (1862–1939), Russian art historian
- Dmitry Azarov (born 1970), Russian politician
- Dmitriy Babenko (born 1985), Kazakh speed skater
- Dmitry Bachek (born 2000), Kazakh football midfielder
- Dmitri Badin (born 1990), Russian intelligence officer and hacker
- Dmitry Baga (born 1990), Belarusian football midfielder
- Dmitry Bagration (1863–1919), Georgian general and military writer
- Dmitry Bagration-Imeretinsky (1799–1845), Georgian prince
- Dmitry Bagryanov (1967–2015), Soviet long jumper
- Dmitry Baiduk (born 1996), Belarusian football midfielder
- Dmitry Bakanov (born 1985), Russian cosmonautical official and economist
- Dmitry Baksheevy (1982–2020), Russian murderer
- Dmitry Balakin (born 1985), Russian serial killer who killed three people
- Dmitriy Balandin (born 1995), Kazakh swimmer
- Dmitry Balmin (born 1970), Russian ice hockey defender
- Dmitry Baltermants (1912–1990), Soviet photojournalist
- Dmitry Bandura, Soviet-born Canadian scientist
- Dmitry Bankovsky (born 1968), Soviet sprint canoer
- Dmitri Bantysh-Kamensky (1788–1850), Russian statesman and historian
- Dmitri Barannik (born 1963), Soviet football midfielder
- Dmitri Barinov (born 1996), Russian football midfielder
- Dmitri Barkov (sport shooter) (1880–?), Finnish sport shooter
- Dmitry Barkov (footballer) (born 1992), Russian football striker
- Dmitriy Barmashov (born 1985), Kazakh skier
- Dmitri Barsuk (born 1980), Russian beach volleyball player
- Dmitry Bashkevich (born 1968), Uzbek football goalkeeper
- Dmitri Bashkirov (1931–2021), Russo-Soviet pianist and educator
- Dmitri Batynkov (born 1970), Russian football midfielder
- Dmitry Bavilsky (1969–2026), Russian novelist
- Dmitri Bayda (born 1975), Russian football forward
- Dmitry Begichev (1786–1855), Russian imperial governor and writer
- Dmitry Begun (born 2003), Russian football left back
- Dmitry Bekhterev (born 1949), Soviet rower
- Dmitry Beliakov (born 1970), Russian photojournalist
- Dmitry Belik (born 1969), Russian politician
- Dmitry Bellman (born 1977), Georgian jeweler-craftsman
- Dmitry Belogolovtsev (born 1973), Russian former principal dancer of the Bolshoi Ballet
- Dmitry Belorukov (born 1983), Russian football coach and player
- Dmitry Belosselskiy (born 1975), Russian operatic bass singer
- Dmitri Belousov (born 1980), Russian football goalkeeper
- Dmitri Belov (footballer, born 1980), Russian football player
- Dmitri Belov (footballer, born 1995), Russian football forward
- Dmitry Belyaev (artist) (1921–2007), Soviet painter
- Dmitry Belyayev (zoologist) (1917–1985), Soviet geneticist
- Dmitry Berestov (born 1980), Russian weightlifter
- Dmitry Berezkin (born 1963), Russian sailor
- Dmitri Berlinsky (born 1969), Russian violinist
- Dmitry Bertman (born 1967), Russian operatic director
- Dmitry Beshenets (born 1984), Russian martial artist
- Dmitry Bessmertny (born 1997), Belarusian football midfielder
- Dmitri Bezus (born 1989), Ukrainian martial artist
- Dmitri Bilenkin (1933–1987), Soviet science fiction writer
- Dmitry Bilozerchev (born 1966), Soviet gymnast
- Dmitry Bisikalo (born 1961), Russian astrophysicist
- Dmitry Bisti (1925–1990), Soviet woodcut artist
- Dmitry Bivol (born 1990), Russian boxer
- Dmitry Blokhintsev (1907–1979), Soviet physicist
- Dmitry Bludov (1785–1864), Russian imperial official
- Dmitry Bobyshev (born 1936), Soviet poet
- Dmitry Bocharov (chess player) (born 1982), Russian chess grandmaster
- Dmitry Bochkaryov (born 1958), Soviet speed skater
- Dmitry Bogachev (born 1969), Russian theater producer
- Dmitry Bogayev (born 1994), Russian footballer
- Dmitry Bogdanov (born 1979), Russian runner
- Dmitrii Bogrov (1887–1911), Assassin of Pyotr Stolypin
- Dmitri Bolshakov (born 1980), Russian football midfielder
- Dmitri Bondarenko (born 1968), Russian Africanist
- Dmitry Boretsky (died 1471), Russian nobleman
- Dmitri Borgmann (1927–1985), German-American logologist
- Dmitri Borisov (footballer, born 1977), Russian football midfielder
- Dmitri Borisov (footballer, born 1996), Russian football midfielder
- Dmitry Borisov (anchorman) (born 1985), Russian journalist
- Dmitry Borisovich (1253–1294), Prince of Rostov
- Dmitri Borodin (born 1977), Russian football goalkeeper
- Dmitry Nikolaevich Borodin (1887–1957), Soviet agronomist
- Dmitry Borovikov (1984–2006), Russian neo-Nazi
- Dmitry Borshch (born 1973), Soviet-born American artist
- Dmitry Bortniansky (1751–1825), Russian composer
- Dmitry Bosov (1968–2020), Russian businessman
- Dmitry Bragin (born 1982), Russian racing driver
- Dmitri Bruns (1929–2020), Latvian architect
- Dmitry of Bryansk (died 1399), Lithuanian Prince
- Dmitry Buchkin (1927–2024), Russo-Soviet painter
- Dmitry Budker (born 1963), Soviet-American physicist
- Dmitri Budõlin (born 1974), Estonian judoka
- Dmitri Bugakov (born 1979), Russian football coach and player
- Dmitry Buinitsky (born 1997), Belarusian ice hockey player
- Dmitry Bukhman (born 1985), Russian-British game developer
- Dmitry Bulankin (born 1978), Russian racer
- Dmitry Bulgakov (born 1954), Russian military logistician
- Dmitri Bulykin (born 1979), Russian football player
- Dmitri Burago (born 1964), Soviet-American mathematician
- Dmitry Burkov (born 1960), Russian internet engineer
- Dmitry Burmakin (born 1981), Russian runner
- Dmitri Burmistrov (born 1983), Russian football forward
- Dmitry Buryak (born 1987), Russian sprinter
- Dmitri Bushmanov (born 1978), Russian football midfielder
- Dmitri Butaliy (born 1976), Russian football defender
- Dmitry Buturlin (1790–1849), Russian general and military historian
- Dmitri Buynov (1859–?), Azeri architect
- Dmitry Byakov (born 1978), Kazakh football midfielder
- Dmitri Bykov (ice hockey) (born 1977), Russian ice hockey player
- Dmitry Bykov (born 1967), Russian writer, journalist, and poet
- Dmitri Bystrolyotov (1901–1975), Soviet spy
- Dmitry Bystrov (1967–2005), Russian football defender
- Dmitri Capyrin (born 1960), Russian classical composer
- Dmitry Chaplin (born 1982), Russian professional dancer
- Dmitry Chebotayev (1978–2007), Russian photojournalist killed on assignment in Iraq
- Dmitry Chechulin (1901–1981), Soviet stalinist architect
- Dmitry Chelkak (born 1979), Soviet-American mathematician
- Dmitry Chelovenko (born 1974), Russian ski jumper
- Dmitry Chepovetsky (born 1970), Soviet-born Canadian actor
- Dmitry Chernov (1839–1921), Russian metallurgist
- Dmitry Chernukhin (born 1988), Russian football midfielder
- Dmitri Chernykh (born 1985), Russian ice hockey forward
- Dmitry Chernyshenko (born 1968), Russian politician
- Dmitri Cheryshev (born 1969), Russian football manager
- Dmitry Chernyshyov (born 1975), Russian swimmer
- Dmitri Chesnokov (1973–2019), Russian football forward
- Dmitry Chesnokov (politician) (1910–1973), Soviet politician
- Dmitry Chestnov, Russian astronomer
- Dmitri Chigazov (born 1983), Russian football goalkeeper
- Dmitri Chikhradze (1922–1979), Georgian football coach and player
- Dmitri Chistyakov (born 1994), Russian football center-back
- Dmitry Chizhik, Soviet-born American electrical engineer
- Dmitri Chorny (born 1975), Russian communist author
- Dmitry Chudinov (born 1986), Russian middleweight boxer
- Dmitri Chugunov (born 1968), Russian football defender
- Dmitry Chuprov (1978–2012), Russian chess grandmaster
- Dmitri Chvanov (born 1994), Russian football goalkeeper
- Dmitriy Chvykov (born 1974), Kazakh-Kyrgyz ski jumper
- Dmitri Constantinov (born 1952), Moldovan politician and businessman
- Dmitriy Danilenko (born 1990), Russian fencer
- Dmitri Dashinski (born 1997), Belarusian skier
- Dmitry Dashkov (1789–1839), Russian statesman and writer
- Dmitri Davydov (footballer, born 1975), Russian football manager and player
- Dmitry Davydov (footballer, born 1978), Russo-Ukrainian football goalkeeper
- Dmitry Davydov (filmmaker) (born 1983), Russian film director
- Dmitry Debelka (1976–2022), Belarusian wrestler
- Dmitry Dedov (born 1967), Russian judge
- Dmitry Demeshin (born 1976), Russian lawyer and Governor of Khabarovsk Krai
- Dmitry Demidov (born 1975), Belarusian politician
- Dmitry Demushkin (born 1979), belarusian politician
- Dmitry Denisov (born 1970), Russian ice hockey player
- Dmitry Dilschneider (born 1981), Russian serial killer who killed five people
- Dmitri Dmitrijev (born 1982), Estonian politician
- Dmitry Dmitriyenko (born 1963), Russo-Uzbek politician and Governor of Murmansk Oblast
- Dmitry Dobroskok (born 1984), Russian diver
- Dmitry Dokhturov (1756–1816), Russian general
- Dmitry Dokuchaev (born 1984), Russian intelligence officer and convicted cyber criminal
- Dmitry Dolgopyat (born 1972), Soviet-American mathematician
- Dmitri Dolgov, Soviet-American businessman
- Dmitri Domani (born 1974), Russian basketball coach and player
- Dmitry Dorofeyev (born 1976), Russian speed skater
- Dmitri Dovgalenok (born 1971), Belarusian sprint canoeist
- Dmitri Dozortsev, Soviet-American physician
- Dmitri Dragun (born 1994), Russian ice dancer
- Dmitri Drevin (born 1982), Russian gymnast
- Dmitry Dubrovsky (born 1974), Russian skier
- Dmitry Dubyago (1849–1918), Russian astronomer
- Dmitry Dudar (born 1991), Belarusian football goalkeeper
- Dmitri Dudarev (born 1976), Kazakh ice hockey player
- Dmitri Dudik (born 1977), Belarusian ice hockey player
- Dmitri Dugin (born 1968), Russian water polo player
- Dmitri Dun (born 1989), Ukrainian ice dancer
- Dmitry Dvali (born 2000), Russian boxer
- Dmitry Dyachenko (born 1972), Russian film director and writer
- Dmitri Dyuzhev (born 1978), Russian actor, singer, and director
- Dmitri Egorov (1869–1931), Russian mathematician
- Dmitri Ekimov (born 1971), Russo-Belarusian football goalkeeper
- Dmitry Epstein (born 1993), Dutch pair skater
- Dmitry Faddeev (1907–1989), Soviet mathematician
- Dmitry Faizullin (born 1991), Russian futsal player
- Dmitry Fedoseyev (born 1965), Russian football official and defender
- Dmitry Feichtner-Kozlov (born 1972), Soviet-German mathematician
- Dmitry Fesenko (1895–1937), Russian commander and victim of the Great Purge
- Dmitri Filatov (born 1977), Russian football defender
- Dmitri Filimonov (1971–2024), Russian ice hockey player
- Dmitry Filippov (born 1969), Russian handball player and coach
- Dmitry Filippov (politician) (1944–1998), Soviet politician and assassination victim
- Dmitry Filosofov (1872–1940), Russian writer
- Dmitry Flis (born 1984), Russo-Argentinian basketball player
- Dmitry Fofonov (born 1976), Kazakh cyclist
- Dmitry Gustavovich von Fölkersahm (1846–1905), Baltic German admiral
- Dmitry Fomin (born 1968), Russian volleyball player
- Dmitry Forshev (born 1976), Russian sprinter
- Dmitri Frolov (born 1966), Russian ice hockey player
- Dmitrii Frolov (born 1966), Russian film director
- Dmitri Furman (1943–2011), Russian political scientist and sociologist
- Dmitry Fuchs (born 1939), Russian-American mathematician
- Dmitry Furmanov (1891–1926), Soviet author and political officer
- Dmitriy Gaag (born 1971), Kazakh triathlete
- Dmitry Gabrilovich (born 1961), Soviet-American immunologist and cancer researcher
- Dmitri Gadalov (born 1973), Russian football defender
- Dmitri Galiamin (born 1963), Russian football defender and official
- Dmitri Galin (born 1989), Russian football midfielder
- Dmitry Galkovsky (born 1960), Russian blogger and journalist
- Dmitry Gamov (1834–1903), Russian explorer of Korea
- Dmitry Garanin, Soviet-American physicist
- Dmitri Gavrikov (born 1994), Russian football goalkeeper
- Dmitriy Gavrilov (born 1986), Kazakh basketball player
- Dmitry Gayev (1951–2012), Russian bureaucrat and official of the Moscow Metro
- Dmitry Geller (born 1970), Russian animator and filmmaker
- Dmitrij Gerasimenko (born 1987), Serbian-Soviet judoka
- Dmitry Gerasimenko (born 1978), Russian businessman
- Dmitry Gerasimov, 15th/16th-century Russian translator, diplomat and philologist
- Dmitry Gerasimov (rugby union) (born 1981), Russian rugby union center
- Dmitry Geraskin (1911–1943), Soviet army sergeant
- Dmitry German (born 1988), Belarusian footballer
- Dmitry Girs (1836–1886), Russian writer
- Dmitri Goldenkov (born 1991), Russian ice hockey player
- Dmitry Glinka (diplomat) (1808–1883), Russian diplomat
- Dmitry Glinka (aviator) (1917–1979), Soviet flying ace
- Dmitry Glukhovsky (born 1979), Russian-Israeli author and journalist
- Dmitri Godunok (born 1976), Russian football coach and player
- Dmitri Gogolev (born 1972), Russian ice hockey player
- Dmitry Golitsyn (1771–1844), Russian cavalry general
- Dmitri Alekseyevich Golitsyn (1728–1803), Russian diplomat, scientist, and nobleman
- Dmitri Golubev (footballer, born 1985), Russian football defender
- Dmitri Golubev (footballer, born 1992), Russian football defender
- Dmitri Golubev (footballer, born 1971), Russian football manager and player
- Dmitry Golubev (surgeon) (1906–1991), Soviet surgeon
- Dmitry Golubev (serial killer) (born 1972), Uzbek serial killer who killed four people
- Dmitri Golubov (politician) (born 1983), Uzbek politician
- Dmitry Golubov (born 1985), Russian footballforward
- Dmitri Golyshev (born 1985), Russian football midfielder
- Dmitry Gomza (born 1987), Belarusian football forward
- Dmitri Goncharov (born 1975), Russian football goalkeeper
- Dmitry Gooshchin (born 1982), Israeli correspondence chess grandmaster
- Dmitriy Gorbunov (born 1977), Russian darts player
- Dmitry Gorbushin (born 1986), Russo-Ukrainian football midfielder
- Dmitry Gorchakov (1758–1824), Russian dramatist and playwright
- Dmitry Gordievsky (born 1996), Russian chess grandmaster
- Dmitriy Gordiyenko (born 1986), Kazakh swimmer
- Dmitry Gordon (born 1967), Ukrainian journalist
- Dmitry Gorin, Soviet-American defense lawyer
- Dmitry Goritsky (born 1970), Russian politician
- Dmitry Gorkov (born 1964), Russian football coach and player
- Dmitry Gorshkov (born 1967), Russian water polo player
- Dmitriy Gotfrid (born 1984), Kazakh boxer
- Dmitri Grachyov (born 1983), Russian football center back
- Dmitri Gradilenko (born 1969), Russian football defender
- Dmitry Grave (1863–1939), Russo-Soviet mathematician
- Dmitri Grents (born 1996), Kazakh ice hockey center
- Dmitry Gridin (born 1968), Soviet serial killer of three girls
- Dmitry Grigorenko (born 1978), Russian politician
- Dmitry Grigorieff (1919–2007), Russian-born British-American Archpriest
- Dmitry Grigorovich (engineer) (1883–1938), Ukrainian aircraft designer
- Dmitry Grigorovich (writer) (1822–1900), Russian novelist and anti-serfdom activist
- Dmitry Grigoryev (businessman) (born 1975), Kazakh businessman
- Dmitry Grigoryev (swimmer) (born 1992), Russian Paralympic swimmer
- Dmitry Grishin (born 1978), Russian businessman
- Dmitri Gromov (ice hockey) (born 1991), Russian ice hockey defenseman
- Dmitri Gromov (figure skater) (born1967), Soviet figure skater
- Dmitriy Gruzdev (born 1986), Kazakh cyclist
- Dmitry Gryzlov (born 1979), Russian television presenter
- Dmitry Guberniev (born 1974), Russian TV presenter
- Dmitry Gudanov (born 1975), Russian performer and principal dancer of the Bolshoi Ballet
- Dmitry Gudkov (born 1980), Russian politician
- Dmitry Gudkov (mathematician) (1918–1992), Soviet mathematician
- Dmitri Gulenkov (born 1968), Russian football coach and former goalkeeper
- Dmitry Gulia (1874–1960), Abkhaz-Soviet writer
- Dmitri Gunko (born 1976), Russian football coach and former player
- Dmitry Gurevich (born 1956), Soviet-born American chess grandmaster
- Dmitri Gurkov (born 1996), Kazakh ice hockey center
- Dmitry Guryev (1758–1825), Russian nobleman and statesman
- Dmitri Gusak (born 1985), Russian football midfielder
- Dmitry Gusev (born 1972), Russian political campaign manager
- Dmitry Guz (born 1988), Russian football defender
- Dmitry Horvat (1859–1937), Russian lieutenant-general and immigrant to China
- Dmitri Hvorostovsky (1962–2017), Russian opera singer
- Dmitry Ignatenko (footballer, born 1995), Belarusian football defender
- Dmitry Ignatenko (footballer, born 1988), Belarusian football midfielder
- Dmitry Ignatenko (footballer, born 1969), Russian footballer
- Dmitry Ilinikh (born 1987), Russian volleyball player
- Dmitry Ilovaysky (1832–1920), Russian historian
- Dmitry Ilyin (born 1984), Russian photographer
- Dmitry Ioffe (1963–2020), Soviet-born Israeli mathematician
- Dmitry Ionin (born 1985), Russian politician
- Dmitry Islamov (born 1977), Russian politician
- Dmitry Itskov (born 1980), Russian billionaire
- Dmitri Ivanenko (1904–1994), Soviet physicist
- Dmitri Ivanov (footballer, born 1987), Russian football player
- Dmitri Ivanov (footballer, born 1970) (1970–2023), Russian football coach and player
- Dmitri Ivanov (footballer, born 1994), Russian football defender
- Dmitri Ivanov (footballer, born 2000), Russian football center back
- Dmitry Ivanov (weightlifter) (1928–1993), Soviet weightlifter
- Dmitry Ivanovich (grandson of Ivan III) (1483–1509), Grand Prince of Moscow
- Dmitri Ivanovsky (1864–1920), Russian botanist and virologist
- Dmitry Ivanyuk (1900–1941), Soviet army colonel
- Dmitry Ivchenko (born 1978), Russian football defender
- Dmitry Izotov (born 1984), Russian football coach and former player
- Dmitry Izvekov (born 1981), Russian football midfielder
- Dmitry Jakovenko (born 1983), Russian chess grandmaster
- Dmitrij Jaškin (born 1993), Russian-born Czech ice hockey player
- Dmitri M. Johnson (born 1980), American film producer
- Dmitri Jurowski (born 1979), Soviet-German conductor
- Dmitry Kabalevsky (1904–1987), Russian composer
- Dmitri Kabanov (judoka) (born 1980), Russian judoka
- Dmitri Kabanov (footballer) (born 1985), Russian football defender
- Dmitri Kabutov (born 1992), Russian football right back
- Dmitri Kachenovsky (1827–1872), Russian jurist and international lawyer
- Dmitry Kachin (1929–2025), Soviet politician
- Dmitry Kadenkov (born 1972), Russian politician
- Dmitri Kagarlitsky (born 1989), Russian ice hockey player
- Dmitri Kalinin (born 1980), Russian ice hockey player
- Dmitry Kalinovsky (born 1972), Belarusian swimmer
- Dmitriy Kaltenberger (born 1976), Kazakh sprint canoeist
- Dmitri Kalugin (born 1998), Russian football midfielder
- Dmitry Kamenshchik (born 1968), Russian aeronautical businessman
- Dmitri Kamenshchikov (born 1998), Russian football forward
- Dmitry Kamolikov (1923–1977), Soviet Red Army sergeant
- Dmitry Kapitonov (born 1968), Soviet runner
- Dmitry Kaplunov (born 1994), Belarusian football defender
- Dmitry Kaptilovich (born 2003), Russian football defender
- Dmitry Karakozov (1840–1866), Russian attempted assassin of Alexander II
- Dmitri Karasyov (born 1992), Russian footballer
- Dmitry Karbyshev (1880–1945), Soviet military general and POW
- Dmitry Kardovsky (1866–1943), Soviet painter
- Dmitry Karimov (born 1978), Russian rapist and serial killer
- Dmitri Karkov (born 1966), Soviet footballer
- Dmitriy Karpov (born 1981), Kazakh heptathlete
- Dmitri Karsakov (born 1971), Russian football midfielder
- Dmitri Kartashov (born 1994), Russian football midfielder
- Dmitry Kartashov (rower) (born 1972), Russian rower
- Dmitry Kasperovich (born 1977), Belarusian gymnast
- Dmitry Kawarga, Russian biomorphic artist
- Dmitri Kayumov (born 1992), Russian football midfielder
- Dmitry Kazakov (1972–2022), Russian serial killer and robber
- Dmitri Kazarlyga (born 1971), Kazakh figure skater
- Dmitri Kazionov (born 1984), Russian ice hockey forward
- Dmitri Kedrin (1907–1945), Soviet poet
- Dmitri Kessel (1902–1995), Soviet photojournalist
- Dmitry Khamkin (born 1985), Russian luger
- Dmitry Kharatyan (born 1955), Armenian-Soviet actor
- Dmitri Kharine (born 1968), Russian football coach and former player
- Dmitry Kharitonchik (born 1986), Belarusian football midfielder
- Dmitry Kharitonov (1896–1970), Soviet arachnologist
- Dmitri Kharzeev, Soviet-American theoretical physicist
- Dmitry Khilkov (1858–1914), Socialist revolutionary
- Dmitri Khlebosolov (born 1990), Belarusian football forward
- Dmitri Khlestov (born 1971), Russian football defender
- Dmitri Khokhlov (born 1975), Russian football manager and former player
- Dmitry Kholodov (1967–1994), Russian journalist, killed investigating alleged Russian military corruption
- Dmitri Khomich (born 1984), Russian football coach and former goalkeeper
- Dmitry Khomitsevich (born 1985), Russian racer
- Dmitri Khomukha (born 1969), Turkmen footballer
- Dmitry Khorkin (born 1986), Ukrainian radio-tele host
- Dmitry Khovratovich, Russian cryptographer
- Dmitri Khristich (born 1969), Ukrainian ice hockey coach and player
- Dmitri Khristis (born 1996), Russian footballer
- Dmitri Khromin (born 1982), Russian pair skater
- Dmitry Khvostov (basketball) (born 1989), Russian basketball player
- Dmitry Khvostov (1757–1835), Russian classical poet
- Dmitriy Kim (born 1989), Uzbek taekwondoin
- Dmitri Kirichenko (born 1977), Russian football coach and former striker
- Dmitri Kirillov (born 1998), Russian footballer
- Dmitry Kirillov (curler) (born 1968), Belarusian curler
- Dmitri Kiselev (born 1989), Russian ice dancer
- Dmitry Kiselyov (born 1954), Russian television presenter
- Dmitry Kiselyov (film director) (born 1978), Russian film director
- Dmitry Kisiev, Crimean political strategist
- Dmitri Kitayenko (born 1940), Russo-Soviet conductor
- Dmitry Kiyko (born 1977), Belarusian politician
- Dmitri Klabukov (born 1980), Russian footballer
- Dmitri Klebanov (1907–1987), Soviet composer and teacher
- Dmitri Klevakin (born 1976), Russian ice hockey player
- Dmitry Kliger (born 1968), Russian sprinter
- Dmitry Klimenko (born 1969), Russian soldier of the Chechen Wars
- Dmitry Klimov (born 1983), Russian football coach and former player
- Dmitri Klimovich (footballer, born 1972), Belarusian football defender
- Dmitry Klitsov, Russian football midfielder
- Dmitry Klokov (born 1983), Russian weightlifter
- Dmitry Knyazhevich (1874–1918), Russian fencer and soldier killed during the October Revolution
- Dmitri Kobesov (born 1998), Russian football defender
- Dmitriy Koblov (born 1992), Kazakh hurdler
- Dmitry Kobylkin (born 1971), Russian politician
- Dmitry Kochkin (born 1934), Soviet skier
- Dmitry Kochnev (born 1964), Russian army general
- Dmitri Kogan (1978–2017), Russian violinist
- Dmitrii Kokarev (swimmer) (born 1991), Russian swimmer
- Dmitry Kokarev (chess player) (born 1982), Russian chess Grandmaster
- Dmitry Koldun (born 1985), Belarusian pop singer
- Dmitry Kolezev (born 1984), Russian journalist and government critic
- Dmitry Kolker (1968–2022), Russian physicist and prisoner
- Dmitry Koltakov (born 1990), Russian racer
- Dmitri Kombarov (born 1987), Russian football coach and former left back
- Dmitry Komornikov (born 1981), Russian swimmer
- Dmitri Kondratyev (born 1969), Russian cosmonaut
- Dmitry Kononenko (born 1988), Ukrainian chess grandmaster
- Dmitry Konov (born 1970), Russian business executive
- Dmitri Konovalov (1856–1929), Russian physical chemist
- Dmitry Koptur (born 1978), Belarusian swimmer
- Dmitry Kopylov (born 1988), Russian serial killer who killed five people as a juvenile
- Dmitry Kornev (born 1992), Russian handball player
- Dmitri Korobov (footballer) (born 1994), Russian football midfielder
- Dmitry Korobov (born 1989), Belarusian ice hockey player
- Dmitry Korolyov (born 1988), Russian football defender
- Dmitry Korshakov (born 1991), Russian basketball player
- Dmitri Kortava (born 1990), Russo-Georgian football forward
- Dmitry Kortnev, Russian football goalkeeper
- Dmitry Korzh, Turkmen football defender
- Dmitry Kosenko (born 1986), Russian footballer
- Dmitriy Koshkin (born 1986), Russo-Kazakh skier
- Dmitri Kosmachev (born 1985), Russian ice hockey defenseman
- Dmitry Kosov (born 1968), Russo-Soviet sprinter
- Dmitry Kostomarov (1929–2014), Russo-Soviet mathematician
- Dmitri Kostromitin (born 1990), Russian ice hockey defenseman
- Dmitri Kostrov (born 1981), Russian football defender
- Dmitri Kostyayev (born 1989), Russian football midfielder
- Dmitri Kotov (born 2000), Russian football forward
- Dmitri Kovalenko (born 19820, Russian football defender
- Dmitry Kovalëv (volleyball) (born 1991), Russian volleyball player
- Dmitry Kovalyov (handballer) (born 1982), Russian handball player
- Dmitry Kovalyov (rower) (born 1976), Russian rower
- Dmitry Kovtsun (born 1955), Ukrainian discus thrower
- Dmitry Kovtun (1965–2022), Russian KGB agent
- Dmitry Kozak (born 1958), Russian politician
- Dmitri Kozlov (engineer) (1919–2009), Soviet aerospace engineer
- Dmitri Kozlov (footballer) (born 1984), Russian football forward
- Dmitry Kozonchuk (born 1984), Russian cyclist
- Dmitry Kramarenko (born 1974), Azeri football goalkeeper
- Dmitry Kramkov, Russian mathematician
- Dmitry Krasilnikov (born 1979), Russian football goalkeeper
- Dmitry Krasilnikov (political science) (born 1971), Russian politologist
- Dmitry Krasilov (1994–2023), Russian dancer
- Dmitry Krasnov (born 1959), Russian politician
- Dmitry Krasny (died 1440), Russian nobleman and potential poisoning victim
- Dmitri Kratkov (born 2002), Russian football midfielder
- Dmitri Kraush (born 1969), Russian footballer
- Dmitry Krivosheyev (born 1998), Belarusian football midfielder
- Dmitry Kroyter (born 1993), Israeli Olympic high jumper
- Dmitri Kruglov (born 1984), Estonian footballer
- Dmitry Krutoi (born 1981), Belarusian politician
- Dmitry Krylov (born 1946), Russo-Soviet journalist
- Dmitry Krymov (born 1954), Russian theatre director and sceneographer
- Dmitri Kryuchkov (1887–1938), Russian Catholic writer and political prisoner
- Dmitri Tippens Krushnic, birth name of Misha Collins (born 1974), American actor
- Dmitry Kuchugura (born 2004), Russian football right winger
- Dmitri Kudinov (footballer, born 1985), Russian football defender
- Dmitri Kudinov (footballer, born 1971), Russian footballer
- Dmitri Kudinov (football manager) (born 1985), Russian football manager
- Dmitri Kudryashov (born 1983), Russian football coach and former midfielder
- Dmitry Kudryashov (boxer) (born 1985), Russian boxer
- Dmitri Kugryshev (born 1990), Russian ice hockey forward
- Dmitry Kulagin (born 1992), Russian basketball player
- Dmitry Kuleshov (born 1978), Kazakh-Russian serial killer and rapist
- Dmitri Kulikov (footballer) (born 1977), Estonian footballer
- Dmitry Kulikov (ice hockey) (born 1990), Russian ice hockey defenseman
- Dmitri Kurayev (born 1995), Russian football defender
- Dmitry Kursky (1874–1932), Soviet politician
- Dmitry Kustanovich (born 1970), Belarusian painter
- Dmitri Kutejnikov (1766–1844), Cossack imperial general
- Dmitry Kuzelev (born 1969), Russian handball player
- Dmitri Kuzmin (born 1977), Russo-Kyrgyz swimmer
- Dmitry Kuzmin (born 1968), Russian poet and activist
- Dmitry Kuzmin (mayor) (born 1977), Russian politician
- Dmitry Kuzmin (senator) (born 1975), Russian politician
- Dmitry Kuzmin-Karavayev (1886–1959), Russian Catholic revolutionary
- Dmitri Kuznetsov (footballer, born 1965), Russian football coach and former player
- Dmitri Kuznetsov (footballer, born 1972), Russian football midfielder
- Dmitry Kuznetsov (politician) (born 1975), Russian politician
- Dmitry Kuzyakin (born 1961), Russian politician
- Dmitry Kvach (born 1974), Kazakh skier
- Dmitri Kvartalnov (born 1966), Soviet ice hockey left wing
- Dmitry Lachinov (1842–1902), Russian physicist
- Dmitri Lagunov (1888–1942), Russian footballer and victim of the Siege of Leningrad
- Dmitri Lagutin, Soviet-Kazakh ice dancer
- Dmitry Lameykin (born 1977), Russian politician
- Dmitry Landakov (born 1999), Russian football goalkeeper
- Dmitry Lapikov (born 1982), Russian weightlifter
- Dmitry Lapkes (born 1976), Belarusian fencer
- Dmitry Laptev (1701–1771), Russian arctic explorer and vice admiral; namesake of the Dmitry Laptev Strait
- Dmitry Larin (born 1973), Russian football manager and former player
- Dmitry Larionov (born 1985), Russian canoeist
- Dmitry Latykhov (born 2003), Belarusian football forward
- Dmitry Lavrinenko (1914–1941), Soviet WWII tank ace and commander
- Dmitri Lavrishchev (born 1998), Russian football forward
- Dmitry Lebed (born 1986), Russian serial killer and rapist
- Dmitry Lebed (revolutionary) (1893–1937), Russo-Soviet politician and victim of the Great Purge
- Dmitri Lebedev (businessman) (born 1968), Russian financier
- Dmitri Lebedev (general) (1872–1935), Russo-Estonian military general
- Dmitry Lelyushenko (1901–1987), Soviet army general
- Dmitry Lensky (1805–1860), Russian comedy actor and vaudeville writer
- Dmitry Lentsevich (born 1983), Belarusian football coach and former defender
- Dmitry Leonov (1899–1981), Soviet military leader
- Dmitry Lepikov (born 1972), Russian freestyle swimmer
- Dmitry Lesnevsky (born 1970), Russian-British-Israeli film producer
- Dmitri Lesnikov (born 1999), Russian football forward
- Dmitri Levinsky (born 1981), Russo-Kazakh hockey forward
- Dmitry Levitzky (1735–1822), Russian painter
- Dmitry Likhachev (1906–1999), Soviet academic and dissident
- Dmitri Linter (born 1973), Russo-Estonian political activist
- Dmitry Lipartov (born 1973), Russian football forward
- Dmitri Lipskerov (born 1964), Russian writer and dramatist
- Dmitry Lisakovich (born 1999), Belarusian football midfielder
- Dmitry Lisanevich (1778–1825), Russian army general
- Dmitry Lisitsyn, Russian environmentalist
- Dmitry Lisov (born 1990), Russian sledge hockey player
- Dmitry Liss (born 1960), Russian conductor and head of the Ural Philharmonic Orchestra
- Dmitry Litvinov (1854–1929), Russian botanist
- Dmitry Livanov (born 1967), Russian academic and bureuacrat
- Dmitri Lobanov (born 1990), Russian football midfielder
- Dmitry Lobanov-Rostovsky (1758–1838), Russian military genreal
- Dmitry Lobkov (born 1981), Russian speed skater
- Dmitry Loginov (born 2000), Russian snowboarder
- Dmitriy Lomakin (born 1976), Kazakh weightlifter
- Dmitry Lomakov, Russian car collector
- Dmitry Loshkaryov (born 1987), Russian football midfielder
- Dmitri Loskov (born 1974), Russian football coach and former player
- Dmitry Lotsmanov (born 1975), Russian politician
- Dmitry Loveyko (born 1965), Russian businessman
- Dmitry Loza (1922–2001), Soviet WWII military colonel
- Dmitri Lugin (born 1990), Russian ice hockey winger
- Dmitry Lukashenko (born 1980), Belarusian businessman and son of President Alexander Lukashenko
- Dmitry Lukyanov (cyclist) (born 1993), Kazakh cyclist
- Dmitry Lukyanov (general) (1900–1985), Soviet WWII army general
- Dmitry Lyapkin (born 1976), Kazakh football defender
- Dmitri Lyskov (born 1987), Russian futsal player
- Dmitry Lyzik (born 2000), Russian volleyball player
- Dmitry Machinsky (1937–2012), Soviet archaeologist
- Dmitry Maevsky (1917–1992), Soviet painter
- Dmitri Makarov (footballer) (born 1982), Russian football forward
- Dmitri Makarov (ice hockey) (born 1983), Russian ice hockey winger
- Dmitry Makhonin (born 1982), Russian politician and Governor of Perm Krai
- Dmitry Makovsky (born 2000), Russian football midfielder
- Dmitry Maksimov (runner) (born 1977), Russian long-distance runner
- Dmitry Maksimov (judoka) (born 1978), Russian judoka
- Dmitry Dmitrievich Maksutov (1896–1964), Soviet optical engineer
- Dmitry Petrovich Maksutov (1832–1889), Russian navy admiral and Governor of Russian Alaska
- Dmitry Malakhov (born 1974), Kazakh politician and jurist
- Dmitry Maleshin, Russian legal scholar
- Dmitri Malgin (born 1987), Kazakh football goalie
- Dmitri Malikov (footballer) (born 1997), Russian footballer
- Dmitry Malikov (born 1970), Russian singer
- Dmitry Malozemov (1897–1998), Russian centenarian and last national veteran of World War I
- Dmitry Maltsev (born 1991), Russian football forward
- Dmitri Malyaka (born 1990), Russian football midfielder
- Dmitry Malykhin (born 2000), Russian football midfielder
- Dmitry Malyshko (born 1987), Russian biathlete
- Dmitry Mamin-Sibiryak (1852–1912), Russian novelist
- Dmitry Mamonov (born 1978), Kazakh football manager and former player
- Dmitri Mandrîcenco (born 1997), Moldovan football midfielder
- Dmitri Maneacov (born 1992), Moldovan football forward
- Dmitry Manuilsky (1883–1959), Soviet revolutionary
- Dmitri Marfinsky (born 1989), Russian tennis player
- Dmitri Margaryan (born 1978), Armenian Olympic swimmer
- Dmitri Markitesov (born 2001), Russian football midfielder* Dmitri Markov
- Dmitry Markov (photographer) (1982–2024), Russian journalist and political dissident
- Dmitri Marshan (born 1980), Abkhazian statesman and politician
- Dmitry Martynov (born 1991), Russian actor
- Dmitry Marushchak (born 1980), Russian freestyle skier
- Dmitry Maryanov (1969–2017), Soviet actor
- Dmitri Maskayev (born 1987), Russian football player
- Dmitry Masleev (born 1988), Russian pianist
- Dmitri Maslov (born 1977), Soviet-born Canadian-American computer scientist
- Dmitri Matheny (born 1965), American jazz flugelhornist
- Dmitri Matrin (1891–1958), Russian football goalkeeper
- Dmitri Matsjuk (born 1981), Ukrainian-Austrian ice dancer
- Dmitry Matusevich (born 1978), Belarusian politician
- Dmitry Matveyev (canoeist) (born 1944), Soviet sprint canoeist
- Dmitry Matveyev (skier) (born 1984), Russian skier
- Dmitri Matviyenko (born 1989), Russian football defender
- Dmitri Mavrommatis, Greek asset manager
- Dmitry Mazepin (born 1968), Russo-Belarusian oligarch
- Dmitry Mazo (born 1963), Soviet-born Israeli architect
- Dmitry Mazunov (born 1971), Russian table tennis player
- Dmitry Medoyev (born 1960), South Ossetian politician
- Dmitry Medvedev (born 1965), President of Russia from 2008 to 2012
- Dmitry Medvedev (partisan) (1898–1954), Soviet WWII partisan
- Dmitry Medvedev (lieutenant general) (1918–1992), Soviet Air Force Lieutenant General
- Dmitri Megalinsky (born 1985), Russian ice hockey coach and former player
- Dmitri Mehlhorn, American politician advisor
- Dmitri Mendeleev (1834–1907), Russian chemist and inventor of the periodic table
- Dmitry Medvedev (born 1965), Prime Minister and third President of the Russian Federation
- Dmitry Meleshko (born 1982), Belarusian ice hockey winger
- Dmitry Menshikov (born 1997), Russian kickboxer
- Dmitri Merenchukov (born 1999), Russian football forward
- Dmitry Merezhkovsky (1866–1941), Russian novelist and nine-time Nobel Prize nominee
- Dmitry Mertvago (1760–1824), Russian military officer
- Dmitry Meskhiev (born 1963), Russian film director
- Dmitry Mezentsev (born 1959), Russian politician and Governor of Irkutsk Oblast
- Dmitry Mezhevich (1940–2017), Russo-Soviet theatrical actor
- Dmitri Michkov (born 1980), Russian football coach and former midfielder
- Dmitri Michurenkov (born 19950, Russian football forward
- Dmitry Migunov (born 1992), Russian speed skater
- Dmitry Mikhailovich Golitsyn the Younger (1721–1793), Russian diplomat
- Dmitry Mikhailovich Golitsyn the Elder (1665–1737), Russian aristocrat and political prisoner
- Dmitry Mikhaylenko (footballer, born 1995), Russian football midfielder
- Dmitry Mikhaylenko (footballer, born 2000), Russian football defender
- Dmitry Mikhaylov (born 1976), Russian football coach and former goalie
- Dmitri Milchakov (born 1986), Belarusian ice hockey goalie
- Dmitry Milevsky (born 1991), Russian football midfielder
- Dmitry Miller (born 1972), Russian theater actor
- Dmitry Milyaev (born 1975), Russian politician and Governor of Tula Oblast
- Dmitry Milyutin (1816–1912), Russian field marshall and Minister of War
- Dmitry Minayev (1835–1889), Russian translator andpoet
- Dmitry Mirimanoff (1861–1945), Russian-Swiss mathematician
- Dmitri Mironov (born 1965), Russian ice hockey defenseman
- Dmitry Mironov (born 1992), Russian curler
- Dmitry Mironov (politician) (born 1968), Russian politician and Governor of Yaroslavl Oblast
- Dmitry Miroshnichenko (born 1992), Kazakh football defender
- Dmitry Mishin (1919–1998), Soviet physicist and magnetic scientist
- Dmitri Mitroga (born 2000), Russian football midfielder
- Dmitry Mitrokhin (1883–1973), Russo-Soviet artist
- Dmitri Molchanov (born 2000), Russian football forward
- Dmitry Molosh (born 1981), Belarusian football manager and former player
- Dmitry Monakhov (1900–1944), Soviet WWII general
- Dmitry Monakov (1963–2007), Soviet sport shooter
- Dmitri Monya (born 1988), Russian ice hockey right winger
- Dmitry Moor (1883–1946), Russo-Soviet painter and propagandist
- Dmitry Morduhai-Boltovskoi (1876–1952), Russian mathematician
- Dmitri Morozov (born 1974), Russian judoka
- Dmitry Morozov (born 1971), Russian politician and surgeon
- Dmitry Mukhomediarov (born 1999), Russian cyclist
- Dmitry Mulkevich (born 1996), Belarusian football midfielder
- Dmitry Muratov (born 1961), Russian opposition journalist and Nobel Peace Prize winner
- Dmitry Muserskiy (born 1988), Russo-Ukrainian football player
- Dmitry Mushketov (1882–1938), Russian paleontologist and victim of the Great Purge
- Dmitri Nabokov (1934–2012), Russian operatic singer and translator
- Dmitri Nabokov (ice hockey) (1977–2019), Russian ice hockey player
- Dmitry Nadyozhny (1873–1945), Russo-Soviet military general
- Dmitry Nagiyev (born 1967), Russian theatrical actor and television presenter
- Dmitry Nakonechny (born 1991), Russian orienteer
- Dmitry Nalbandyan (1906–1993), Soviet-Armenian painter
- Dmitry Nalivkin (1889–1982), Soviet geologist
- Dmitry Naryshkin (1792–1831), Soviet military officer and politician
- Dmitri Naumkin (born 1976), Russian ice dancer
- Dmitry Nazarov (footballer) (born 1990), Kazakh-Azeri football striker
- Dmitry Nazarov (born 1957), Russian actor
- Dmitry Nekrashevich (born 2001), Belarusian football midfielder
- Dmitry Nelyubin (1971–20050, Russo-Soviet track cyclist
- Dmitry Neverovsky (1771–1813), Russian military officer
- Dmitry Nevmerzhitsky (born 1975), Russian archer
- Dmitriý Neželew (born 1970), Turkmeni football midfielder
- Dmitry Nikitin (born 2006), Russian footballer
- Dmitri Nikitinsky (born 1992), Russian football left back
- Dmitry Nos (born 1970), Soviet rower
- Dmitri Nossov (born 1980), Russian judoka and politician
- Dmitri Novgorodsky, Ukrainian classical pianist
- Dmitry Novikov (born 1969), Russian Communist politician
- Dmitry Novikov (politician, born 1989), Russian Duma politician
- Dmitri Nusinow, American chronobiologist
- Dmitry Oboznenko (1930–2002), Soviet painter
- Dmitri Obukhov (born 1983), Russian ice hockey winger
- Dmitry Odinets (1883–1950), Russo-Soviet politician
- Dmitry Parkin (born 1982), Russian 3D-artist and computer graphics specialist
- Dmitry Pavlenko (born 1991), Russian handball player
- Dmitri Pavlovich of Russia (1891–1941), cousin of Tsar Nicholas II who took part in the assassination of Rasputin
- Dmitry Pumpyansky (born 1964), Russian billionaire businessman
- Dmitri Leonidovich Romanowsky (1861–1921), Russian physician
- Dmitry Salita (born 1982), American boxer
- Dmitri Shostakovich (1906–1975), Soviet composer
- Dmitry Matveyevich Smirnov (1919–2005), Soviet algebraic mathematician
- Dmitry Stepushkin (1975–2022), Russian bobsledder
- Dmitri Sychev (born 1983), Russian football player
- Dmitri Lyudvigovich Tomashevich (1899–1974), Soviet aerospace engineer
- Dimitry Tsarevski (born 2003), American ice dancer
- Dmitry Tursunov (born 1982), Russian tennis player
- Dmitry Ustinov (1908–1984), Soviet Defense Minister
- Dmitry Utkin (1970–2023), Russian military officer
- Dmitry Vybornov (born 1970), Russian light-heavyweight boxer
- Dmitry Yazov (1921–2020), Marshal of the Soviet Union
- Dmitri Young (born 1973), American baseball player

== See also ==
- For the variants of the name in other languages, see Demetrius
