= Dmitry Golubev =

Dmitry Golubev may refer to:

- Dmitry Golubev (surgeon) (1906–1991), Soviet Russian surgeon
- Dmitry Golubev (serial killer) (born 1972), Uzbekistani-born stateless serial killer
- Dmitri Golubev (footballer, born 1971), Russian football coach and former forward
- Dmitri Golubev (footballer, born 1985), Russian football defender most notably with FC Shinnik Yaroslavl
- Dmitri Golubev (footballer, born 1992), Russian football defender with FC Krylia Sovetov Samara
- Dmitry Golubev (Belarusian footballer), Belarusian footballer
