= Gavrikov =

Gavrikov (Russian: Гавриков) is a Russian masculine surname, its feminine counterpart is Gavrikova. It may refer to

- Dmitri Gavrikov (born 1994), Russian football player
- Viktor Gavrikov (1957–2016), Lithuanian-Swiss chess grandmaster
- Vladislav Gavrikov (born 1995), Russian ice hockey defenceman
