= Ludvig Schmidt =

Estonian chemist

Ludvig Schmidt (24 November 1894 Tallinn – 23 February 1982 Tallinn) was an Estonian chemist.

In 1930, he graduated from Leningrad State University in chemistry. In 1940, he graduated from Leningrad Institute of Technology in chemistry.

1951–1959, he was the rector of Tallinn Polytechnical Institute.
