= Mavromatis =

Mavromatis or Mavrommatis (Greek: Μαυρομμάτης) is a Greek surname. In Greek,"μαύρα μάτια" means "black eyes" (i.e. having black irises). Notable people with the surname include:

- Sotiris Mavromatis
- Theofanis Mavromatis (born 1997), Greek footballer
- Frangiskos Mavrommatis
- Nikolaos Mavrommatis, Greek sport shooter
- Dmitri Mavrommatis
- Theofanus Mavromatis, known as Fan Noli

== See also ==
- Nikolas Mavromatos (born 1961). Greek theoretical physicist
