= Saint Petersburg State Institute of Technology =

University in Russia

Coordinates: 59°55′06″N 30°19′12″E

University rankings

Regional – Overall
- QS Emerging Europe and Central Asia: 231-240 (2022)

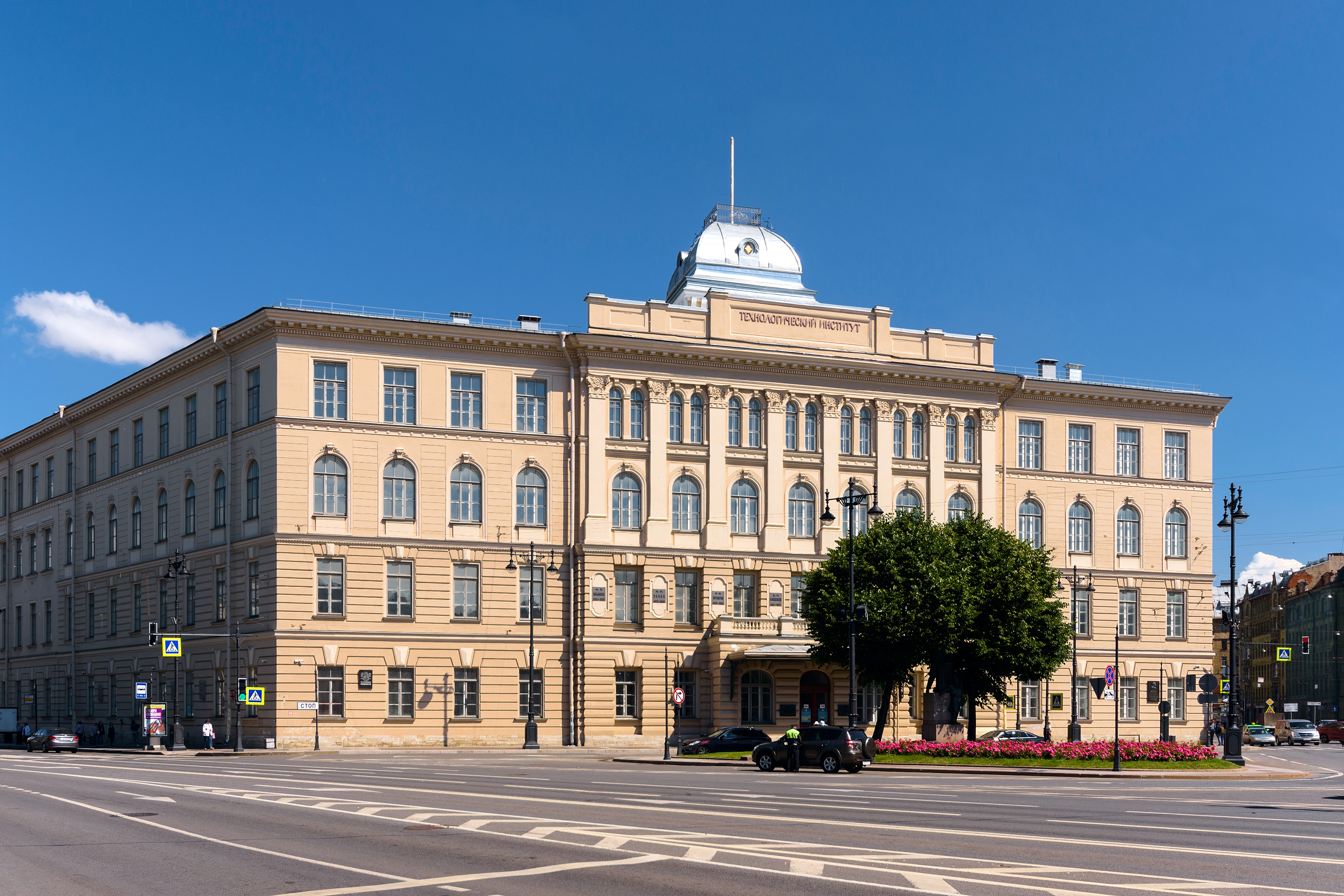
View of the institute

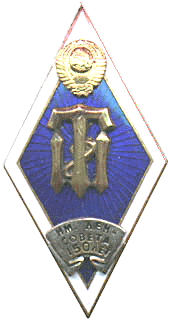
Lapel pin of a graduate from Saint-Petersburg State Institute of Technology

Saint Petersburg State Institute of Technology (Technical University) (Russian: Санкт-Петербургский Государственный Технологический Институт (Технический Университет)) was founded in 1828. It is one of the oldest institutions of higher education in Russia, and currently trains around 5,000 students.

== History ==
In the past, the institute was named Imperial Petersburg Institute of Technology (Russian: Императорский Петербургский Технологический Институт and Lensoviet Leningrad Institute of Technology (Russian: Лениградский Технологический Институт имени Ленсовета), the institute's name changing with that of the city. During the Imperial period, unlike most other Russian universities, the institute did not require completion of gymnasium education as a condition of entry; the only requirement was to pass the institute's examination.

During the Russian Revolution of 1905, the Saint Petersburg Soviet was established and met in the institute.

Andrey Shevchik (Шевчик Андрей Павлович), the rector of the Saint Petersburg State Institute of Technology has signed a letter of support for the Russian invasion of Ukraine.

== Staff ==
Staff include:

- 28 Academicians and Corresponding Members of the Russian Academy of Sciences.
- 125 Professors and Doctors of Science
- 560 Assistant Professors and PhDs

== Degree subjects ==
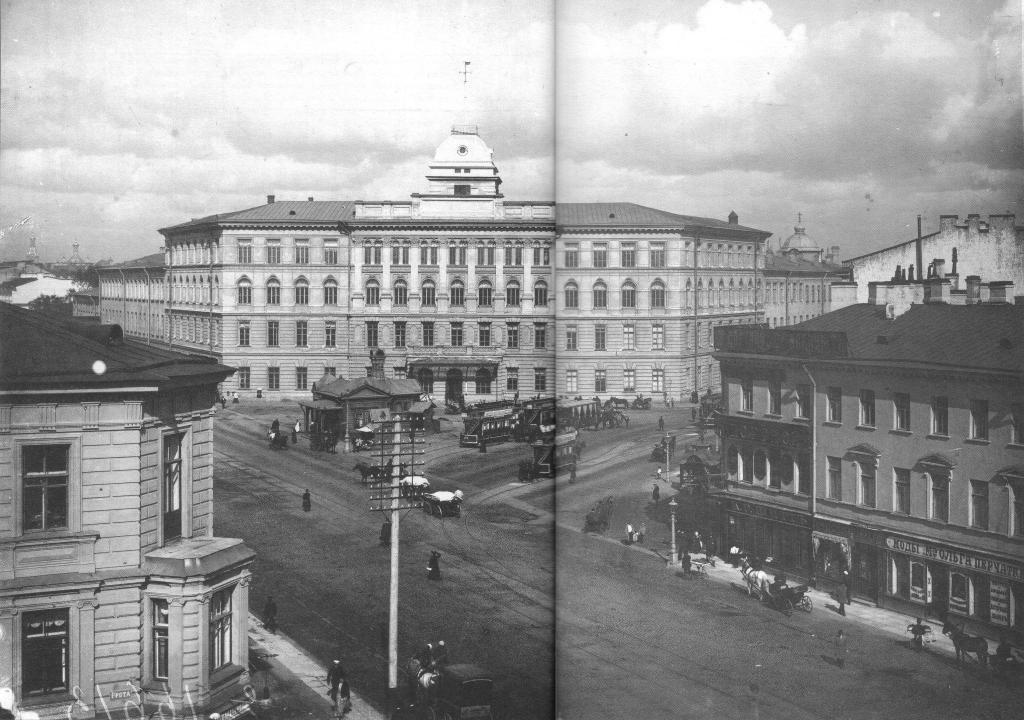
Horsetram stop near the Imperial Petersburg Institute of Technology in 1903

The institute provides degrees in the following subjects:

- New materials for modern branches of science and technology in the fields of rocket and space techniques;
- Information science;
- Study of materials and functional materials;
- Medicine and public health;
- Maintenance of the vital activity of human and ecology;
- Reconstructive materials;
- Varnishes and paints;
- Adhesives;
- Biological materials
- Medicinal materials
- Superconductive materials;
- Optoelectronics and nanomaterials;
- Software engineering;
- Devices for control of chemical processes;
- Machines and apparatuses for chemical-technological system.
- Advertising and public relations

== Notable faculty ==
- Dmitri Mendeleev
- Viktor Kyrpychov
- Konstantin Petrzhak
- Friedrich Konrad Beilstein
- Dmitri Konovalov
- Boris Rosing
- Mikhail Shultz
- Axel Gadolin
- Shuliachenko Aleksey Romanovich (Russian: Шуляченко, Алексей Романович)
- Golovin Kharlampiy Sergeevich (Russian: Головин, Харлампий Сергеевич)

== Notable alumni ==
- Pyotr Nikolaevich Lebedev
- Alexander Lodygin
- Abram Fedorovich Ioffe
- Boris Galerkin
- Yuri Artsutanov
- Alexander Nesis
- Sergey Prokudin-Gorsky
- Mark Gelfand (Medical Device Inventor)
