= Dmitry Geraskin =

Soviet army sergeant (1911–1943)

Dmitry Semyonovich Geraskin
- Дмитрий Семёнович Гераськин
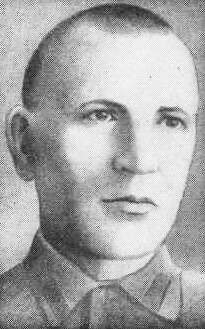
- Born: 1911; Monastyrshchino, Tula Governorate, Russian Empire
- Died: 23 September 1943 (aged 31–32)
- Military career
- Allegiance: USSR
- Branch: Red Army
- Service years: 1941–1943
- Rank: Sergeant
- Unit: 69th Mechanized Brigade
- Conflicts: World War II †
- Awards: Hero of the Soviet Union

Dmitry Semyonovich Geraskin (Russian: Дмитрий Семёнович Гераськин; 1911 – 23 September 1943) was a Red Army sergeant during World War II posthumously made a Hero of the Soviet Union.

== Biography ==
Dmitry Geraskin was born in 1911 in the Monastyrshchino (now Kimovsky district, Tula Oblast) in a peasant family. He completed primary school, after which he worked on a collective farm. In 1941, Geraskin was conscripted into the Red Army, and sent to the front. By September 1943, Sergeant Dmitry Geraskin was a squad leader of the 69th Mechanized Brigade of the 9th Mechanized Corps of the 3rd Guards Tank Army of the Voronezh Front. He distinguished himself during the battle for the Dnieper. On the night of September 21–22, 1943, Geraskin was one of the first in his division to cross the Dnieper. His division managed to dislodge the enemy from the occupied height, and to defend the crossing of the entire company with machine-gun fire. In the battles on the bridgehead on the western bank of the river, Geraskin's branch destroyed dozens of enemy soldiers and officers. During the subsequent offensive actions during the liberation of villages Zarubintsy, Grigorovka, Lukovitsa, Kanevsky region, Cherkass region of the Ukrainian SSR, his squad destroyed about 50 German soldiers and officers. Geraskin participated in the battles himself. On September 23, 1943, he died in battle. He was buried in a mass grave in the village of Grigorovka. By the Decree of the Presidium of the USSR Supreme Soviet of November 17, 1943 for "courage, courage and heroism shown in the fight against the German invaders" Sergeant Dmitry Geraskin was posthumously awarded the title of Hero of the Soviet Union with the Order of Lenin.
