= Dmitry Malozemov =

Last living Russian World War I veteran

- Дмитрий Егорович Малоземов
- Born: 8 May 1897; Russian Empire
- Died: 13 May 1998 (aged 101); Dvurechensk, Sverdlovsk Oblast, Russia
- Military career
- Allegiance: Russian Empire; Soviet Union
- Branch: Imperial Russian Army; Red Army
- Service years: 1915–c. 1918; 1940s
- Conflicts: World War I; Romanian Front; World War II; Siege of Leningrad

Dmitry Yegorovich Malozemov (Russian: Дмитрий Егорович Малоземов, 8 May 1897 – 13 May 1998) was a former Russian soldier and the last known living veteran of World War I in Russia. He was drafted into the Imperial Russian Army in 1915 and also served in the Red Army during World War II.

== Biography ==
Malozemov was born on 8 May 1897 in the Russian Empire. He was drafted into the Imperial Russian Army in 1915, during World War I, and later fought in the Romanian Front. On one occasion while he was there, he saw Emperor Nicholas II in person during a visit he made to front lines. He was involved in close combat in the trenches several times but managed to never get injured. After the Russian Revolution, the soldiers were told by their officers to go home and Malozemov went to work on a farm. He stayed out of the Russian Civil War and avoided being drafted by either side.

Years later, he was drafted to fight in the Red Army during World War II, and fought at the siege of Leningrad. Unlike in the previous war, Malozemov was injured multiple times, including with shrapnel to the head, and his son was killed after also having been drafted. Malozemov worked as a baker after returning to Russia and retired in 1957 on a pension, though he had his own farm animals and he continued mowing hay for them until he was as old as 89. He died after falling in his house on 13 May 1998, not long after his 101st birthday, and was buried in the town where he lived, which was Dvurechensk, Sysertsky District, Sverdlovsk Oblast.

Malozemov did not have national recognition until 2008. The First World War in Russia is far less remembered compared to the Great Patriotic War against the Axis, officially being called an "imperialist war" by Soviet historiography. In 2008, ahead of the 90th anniversary of the Armistice of 11 November 1918, the newspaper Argumenty i Fakty pointed out that the Veterans' Affairs Committee of the State Duma never had contact with any World War I veterans, although some could still be alive, and asked the paper's audience to send information about participants of that war they know or had known. Based on the information they received, they announced in November 2008 that no currently living veteran has been found, and that Dmitry Malozemov was the last known living veteran of World War I in Russia.

== See also ==
- Mikhail Krichevsky, from Ukraine and last overall Russian Empire veteran of World War I
