= Dmitri Capyrin =

Russian composer

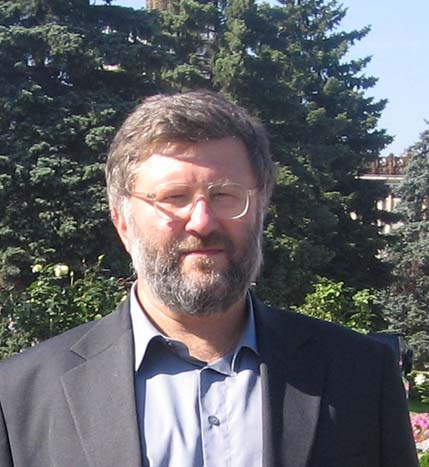
Dmitri Capyrin, Moscow 2005.

Dmitri Yuryevich Capyrin (Russian: Дми́трий Ю́рьевич Капы́рин; born 28 February, 1960 in Moscow) is a Russian composer of contemporary classical music. He graduated from Lviv Conservatory in 1984. He lives in Moscow and works as a freelance composer. His music "successfully combines a variety [of] techniques, often using literary sources and motifs in his works." He won the second prize in the 1994 ICONS competition in Turin and received a scholarship in 1995 from the Berlin Akademie der Künst. In 2010 he was the finalist of the YouTube Online Composers Competition. His compositions have been performed by "numerous prominent ensembles and soloists, and has also been featured in a variety of concert and festival venues, including the Moscow Autumn (1999), the Paris Presences (1993), Warsaw Autumn (2005) and the Music Biennale Zagreb (1993, 2011)." He has become "one of the most prominent composers of the younger generation of Russians." His style combines modal scales procedures with new tonal and atonal idioms. He prefers polyphonic texture and dense stratification of flexible melodic voices. At the same time he widely uses isolated tones and brief solo phrases surrounded with silence which resembles quasi-Webernian pointillism. His work list includes pieces of various genres from opera, symphonies and one movement poems for full and chamber orchestras, concertos for harp and oboe with orchestra, pieces for various chamber ensembles, duo and solo works. Among the performers of his music there are Yvar Mikhashoff, Claude Delangle, Vladimir Jurowski, Vincent Kozlovsky, Marc Sieffert, Valery Popov, Moscow Contemporary Music Ensemble, State Academic Symphony Orchestra of the Russian Federation, Russian National Orchestra, Lviv National Philharmonic Symphony Orchestra, National Academic Symphonic Band of Ukraine, Kyiv Sinfonietta, Da Capo Chamber Players.
