= Dmitry Marushchak =

Russian freestyle skier (born 1980)

Dmitry Vladimirovich Marushchak (Russian: Дмитрий Владимирович Марущак, born 13 November 1980 in Tashkent) is a Russian freestyle skier who specializes in the aerials discipline. He competed at the 2006 Winter Olympics and 2010 Winter Olympics.
