= Dmitry Gorin =

American defense lawyer

Dmitry Gennadovich Gorin
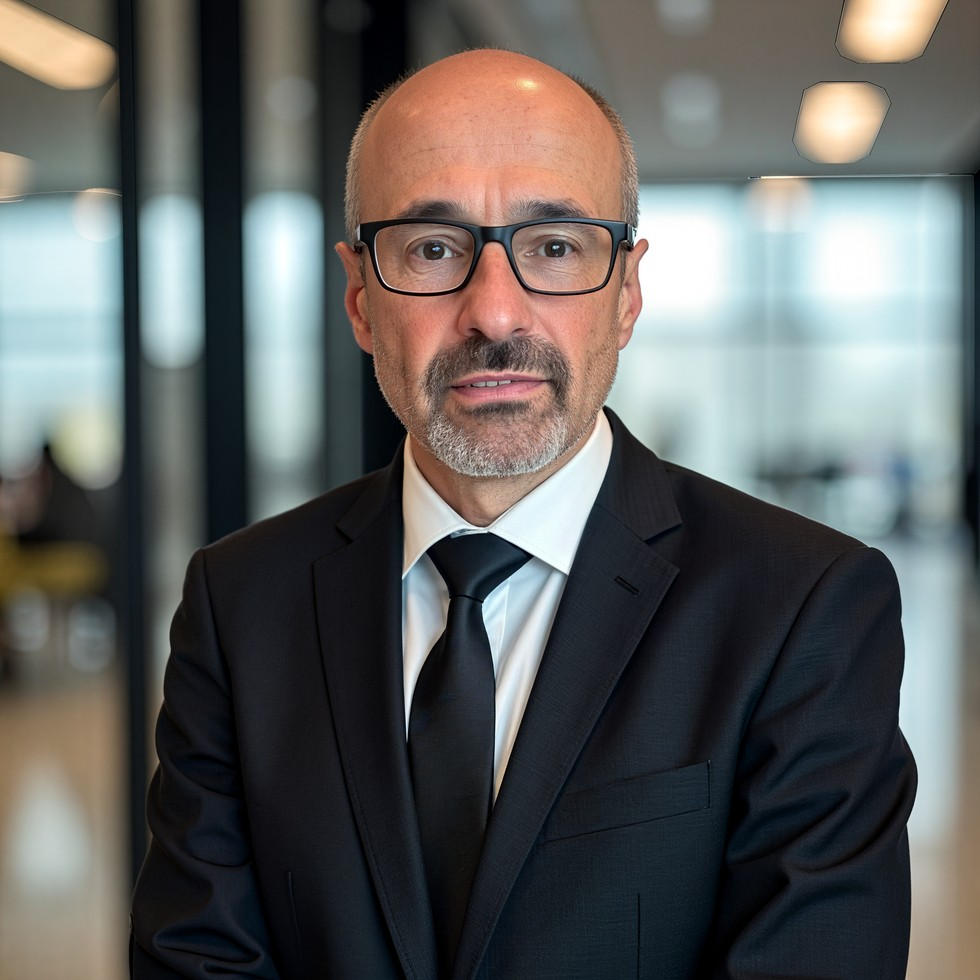
- Born: Russian Soviet Federative Socialist Republic, Soviet Union
- Other name: Dmitry Gennadievich Gorin
- Education: University of California, Los Angeles
- Occupation: Lawyer
- Years active: 1995–present

Dmitry Gennadovich Gorin (Russian: Дмитрий Геннадьевич Горин) is a Soviet-born American defense lawyer. He was a lecturer in the Department of Communication Studies at the University of California, Los Angeles and was an adjunct professor at Pepperdine University School of Law.

== Early life and education ==
Dmitry Gorin was born in the Russian Soviet Federative Socialist Republic in the Soviet Union. He has said there was antisemitism in the Soviet Union. In 1979, when he was nine, his family immigrated to the United States. He got in fights with other students in elementary school in the United States after being called a commie although he did not know what communism was. He attended Fairfax High School in Los Angeles, where he participated in a mock trial program which developed his interest in law.

Gorin attended the University of California, Los Angeles, earning a bachelor's degree in economics in 1992, graduating magna cum laude and receiving Phi Beta Kappa honors. He subsequently earned Juris Doctor degree from the UCLA School of Law.

== Career ==
Gorin worked as a deputy district attorney in the Los Angeles County District Attorney's Office for more than a decade before entering private practice in 2006. He "specialized in complex trial work including gang-related murders, sex crimes, major narcotics cases, and white-collar crimes."

Gorin entered private practice in 2006 as a founding partner of Eisner Gorin LLP with Alan Eisner. Gorin has been certified as a criminal law specialist by the State Bar of California. Gorin's practice has focused on fraud, tax-related violations, and regulatory infractions.

Gorin has been consulted by the Los Angeles Times as a legal commentator on criminal cases.

== Notable cases ==
=== Kathy Griffin–Donald Trump photo controversy (2017) ===
On May 30, 2017, Kathy Griffin posted a video on Instagram and Twitter showing her holding "a severed and bloody head that represented President Donald Trump". The shoot with photographer Tyler Shields drew criticism and Griffin removed the post and issued an apology. Later, Gorin represented Griffin along with Lisa Bloom when Griffin was investigated by the United States Secret Service.

=== Sergey Kovalev assault case (2018–2020) ===
On June 9, 2018, Sergey Kovalev was arrested in California after allegedly punching a woman in the face after she had reportedly rejected his advances. He was charged with felony assault likely to cause great bodily injury, pleaded not guilty on August 27, 2018, and was released on $50,000 bail. Gorin was Kovalev's attorney before Kovalev relieved him for another attorney in January 2020.

=== Naasón Joaquín García case (2019) ===
On June 3, 2019, Naasón Joaquín García was arrested and charged in Los Angeles County with sex-abuse offenses involving minors. Susana Medina Oaxaca and Alondra Ocampo were also charged. Gorin was reported to have argued the bail set by the judge was too high "because there were only four alleged victims and Garcia wasn't accused of 'stranger-on-stranger rape.'"

Gorin represented García in 2019.

=== Matthew Perry death case ===
In August 2024, Kenneth Iwamasa, who worked for Matthew Perry as a live-in assistant, pleaded guilty to conspiracy to distribute ketamine causing death. He admitted to administering multiple ketamine injections to Perry without formal medical training, including several doses on October 28, 2023, the day of Perry's death. Gorin represented Iwamasa together with Alan Eisner.

=== Other ===
Other notable cases include the child abduction involving Maria Pfeifer, the death of Andrea DelVesco, a manslaughter incident at a Persian New Year party, a child pornography case involving UCLA medical professor Guido Germano, a federal case involving alleged catalytic-converter theft that involved members of the Khanna family, and the prosecution of Rebecca Grossman for the deaths of two children in a hit and run. Gorin represented actor Mark Salling during federal criminal proceedings in 2016.
