= Dmitry Lomakov =

Russian businessman and car collector

- Occupations: Businessman and car collector

Dmitry Lomakov is a Russian businessman and car collector, the director of Moscow's museum of retro-automobiles.

Lomakov is the president of Retromoto, and owns 120 antique, including a Mercedes Benz owned by Adolf Hitler. His collection includes Joseph Goebbels' Mercedes-Benz 540K, which was acquired by his father in 1972, Hermann Göring's Horch 853 limousine, and Martin Bormann's Mercedes-Benz 320A.

According to Lomakov, Nazi cars are "symbols of Russia's victory".
