= Dmitry Ilyin =

Russian photographer (born 1984)

- Дми́трий Алекса́ндрович Ильи́н
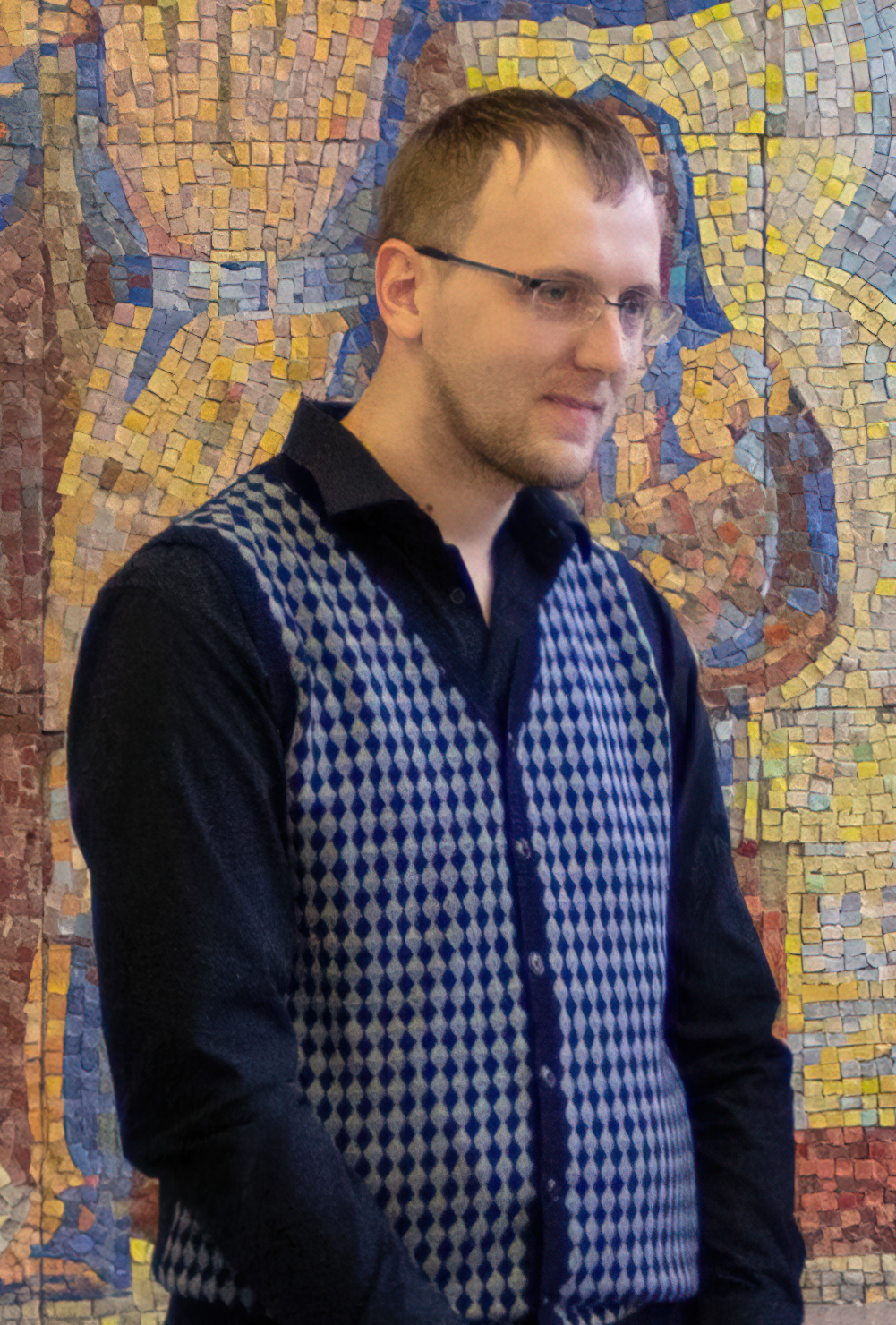
- Born: 1984 (age 41–42); Leningrad, Russian SFSR
- Citizenship: Russia
- Occupation: Fine art photographer
- Notable work: Urban Cubism, Union
- Website: dmilin.com/en

Dmitry Aleksandrovich Ilyin (Russian: Дми́трий Алекса́ндрович Ильи́н; born 1984) is a Russian fine art and documentary street photographer.

== Biography ==
Ilyin was born in Leningrad, USSR. He has lived and worked in Podolsk since 1985.

Ilyin has been creating artistic photography since 2009. He is known primarily for his work, made in the genre of art street life photography. In 2010 he joined the Russian photo club "50mm". Since 2011, Ilyin is one of the head of the photo club.

== Group exhibitions ==
- 2015 Best of Russia 2014, Moscow Contemporary Art Center Winzavod, Moscow
- 2015 Visible Features Of The Era, Foundation for historical photography named after Karl Bulla, Saint Petersburg
- 2016 Best of Russia 2015, Moscow Contemporary Art Center Winzavod, Moscow
- 2016 5th Festival of street photography, Center of documentary photography "FOTODOC", Moscow
- 2016 7th International Festival of Photography "Volga Biennale", The Russian Museum of Photography, Nizhny Novgorod,
- 2016 11th annual photo exhibition "The city - Habitat", The Exhibition Hall book and graphic centre, Saint Petersburg
- 2016 Sony World Photography Awards Exhibition 2016, Somerset House, London
- 2016 16th China International Photographic Art Exhibition, Shengda Art Museum, Zhengzhou, China
- 2016 Planet Moscow - 2016, VDNKh, Moscow
- 2017 3rd International Salon of reporter photography "LifePressPhoto - 2017", National University "Ostroh Academy", Ostroh, Ukraine
- 2017 12th annual photo exhibition "The city - Habitat", The Exhibition Hall book and graphic centre, Saint Petersburg
- 2017 18th International Architecture & Urban Digital Competition, Busan Art Center, Busan, South Korea
- 2018 Young photographers of Russia - 2018, Russian State Library for Young Adults, Moscow, Russia

== Publications ==
- "Best of Russia - 2014", book, Russia, ISBN 978-5-9901798-3-7
- "Best of Russia - 2015", book, Russia, ISBN 978-5-9901798-4-4
- "Planet Moscow - 2016", catalogue, Russia
- "The city - Habitat, 2016", catalogue, Russia
- "Works of 16th China international photographic art exhibition", catalogue, China, ISBN 978-7-5179-0621-6
- "The city - Habitat, 2017", catalogue, Russia
