= Dmitri Karkov =

Russian footballer

Personal information
- Full name: Dmitri Anatolyevich Karkov
- Date of birth: 10 June 1966 (age 60)
- Place of birth: Moscow, Russian SFSR
- Height: 1.78 m (5 ft 10 in)
- Positions: Defender; midfielder

Youth career
- FC Spartak Moscow

Senior career*
Years	Team	Apps	(Gls)
1984	FC Spartak Moscow	0	(0)
1984	FC Volga Gorky	3	(0)
1985–1987	FC Dynamo Vologda	73	(5)
1988–1992	FC Asmaral Moscow	144	(14)
1992	→ FC Presnya Moscow (loan)	21	(5)
1992	FC Karelia Petrozavodsk	15	(6)
1993	FC Asmaral Kislovodsk	9	(1)
1993	FC Torpedo Miass	15	(1)
1995	FC Smena Moscow	16	(0)
1996	FC Spartak Shchyolkovo	3	(0)
- * Club domestic league appearances and goals

Dmitri Anatolyevich Karkov (Russian: Дмитрий Анатольевич Карьков; born 10 June 1966) is a former Russian football player.
