= Dmitri Filatov =

Russian footballer (born 1977)

Personal information
- Full name: Dmitri Vladimirovich Filatov
- Date of birth: 9 February 1977 (age 49)
- Height: 1.84 m (6 ft 1/2 in)
- Position: Defender

Senior career*
Years	Team	Apps	(Gls)
1994–1997	FC Lada Togliatti	21	(1)
1995	→ FC SKD Samara (loan)	4	(0)
1997–1998	FC Volga Ulyanovsk	35	(0)
1999	FC Neftyanik Pokhvistnevo	9	(1)
2000–2003	FC KAMAZ Naberezhnye Chelny	80	(1)
2003	FC Saturn Naberezhnye Chelny (amateur)		
2004–2005	FC Gazovik Orenburg	64	(0)
2006	FC Neftekhimik Nizhnekamsk	5	(0)
- * Club domestic league appearances and goals

Dmitri Vladimirovich Filatov (Russian: Филатов Дмитрий Владимирович; born 9 February 1977) is a former Russian football player.
