= Dmitry Korolyov =

Russian footballer

Personal information
- Full name: Dmitry Vyacheslavovich Korolyov
- Date of birth: 15 April 1988 (age 38)
- Height: 1.86 m (6 ft 1 in)
- Position: Defender

Youth career
- FShM-Torpedo Moscow

Senior career*
Years	Team	Apps	(Gls)
2005–2006	FC Torpedo Moscow	0	(0)
2007–2008	FC Sportakademklub Moscow	22	(0)
2008	FC Krasnodar	5	(0)
2009	FC Saturn-2 Moscow Oblast	27	(2)
2010	FC Sportakademklub Moscow	7	(0)
2011	FC Olimpia Gelendzhik	21	(0)
2012–2013	FC Zvezda Ryazan	29	(0)
2013	FC Zenit Penza	8	(0)
2014	FC Volga Tver	9	(0)
2014–2015	FC Kaluga	15	(0)
- * Club domestic league appearances and goals

Dmitry Vyacheslavovich Korolyov (Russian: Дмитрий Вячеславович Королёв; born 15 April 1988) is a former Russian professional association football player.

== Club career ==
He played in the Russian Football National League for FC Sportakademklub Moscow in 2008.
