= Dmitri Kobesov =

Russian footballer

Personal information
- Full name: Dmitri Vazhayevich Kobesov
- Date of birth: 31 July 1998 (age 28)
- Place of birth: Vladikavkaz, Russia
- Height: 1.82 m (5 ft 11 1/2 in)
- Position: Defender

Youth career
- Yunost Vladikavkaz

Senior career*
| Years | Team | Apps | (Gls) |
| 2019 | FC Spartak Vladikavkaz | 7 | (0) |
| 2019–2022 | FC Alania Vladikavkaz | 33 | (0) |
| 2022–2023 | PFC Dynamo Stavropol | 21 | (1) |
- * Club domestic league appearances and goals

Dmitri Vazhayevich Kobesov (Russian: Дмитрий Важаевич Кобесов; born 31 July 1998) is a Russian former football player.

== Club career ==
He made his debut in the Russian Football National League for FC Alania Vladikavkaz on 8 August 2020 in a game against FC Chayka Peschanokopskoye, as a starter.
