= Dmitry Milevsky =

Russian footballer

Dmitry Milevskyy
Personal information
- Full name: Dmitry Gennadyevich Milevsky
- Date of birth: 28 June 1991 (age 35)
- Height: 1.83 m (6 ft 0 in)
- Position: Midfielder

Senior career*
Years	Team	Apps	(Gls)
2009	FC Chernomorets Novorossiysk	3	(0)
- * Club domestic league appearances and goals

Dmitry Gennadyevich Milevsky (Russian: Дмитрий Геннадьевич Милевский; born 28 June 1991) is a former Russian professional football player.

== Club career ==
He made his Russian Football National League debut for FC Chernomorets Novorossiysk on 29 July 2009 in a game against FC Shinnik Yaroslavl.

== See also ==
- Football in Russia
