= Dmitry Faizullin =

Russian futsal player

Personal information
- Date of birth: 18 February 1991 (age 35)
- Place of birth: USSR
- Position: Goalkeeper

Team information
- Current team: Dina Moscow
- Number: 12

Senior career*
Years	Team	Apps	(Gls)
2007–2009	Norilsk Nickel February	14	(0)
2009–2012	Norilsk Nickel	24	(0)
2012–	Dina Moscow	20	(2)

International career
2010–	Russian	2	(0)
- * Club domestic league appearances and goals

Dmitry Eduardovich Faizullin (Russian: Дмитрий Эдуардович Файзуллин; born February 18, 1991) is a Russian futsal player. He plays as a goalkeeper for the Moscow club Dina Moscow and the Russian national futsal team.

== Biography ==
Faizullin has been playing in "Norilsk Nickel" since 2007, in the first team - since 2009. In the 2010/11 season he became the first goalkeeper in Norilsk. In May 2010, the young goalkeeper was invited to play in the Russian national futsal team for an exhibition game against Japan. His debut in the national team took place in the second game. That year he also became a member of the Russian national team for the Student's World Championship. The national team won the silver medal, and Faizullin was voted the best goalkeeper of the tournament.

== Achievements ==
- Russian Futsal Championship (1): 2014
