= Dmitri Akishin =

Russian ice hockey player

- Born: April 21, 1992 (age 32); Chelyabinsk, Russia
- Height: 6 ft 0 in (183 cm)
- Weight: 190 lb (86 kg; 13 st 8 lb)
- Position: Defence
- Shoots: Left
- KHL team: HC Dynamo Moscow
- NHL draft: Undrafted
- Playing career: 2012–present

Dmitri Igorevich Akishin (Russian: Дмитрий Игоревич Акишин; born April 21, 1992) is a Russian professional ice hockey defenceman.

Akishin played with HC Dynamo Moscow of the Kontinental Hockey League (KHL) during the 2012–13 season.
