= Dmitry Klitsov =

Russian footballer

Personal information
- Full name: Dmitry Vladimirovich Klitsov
- Date of birth: 13 February 1988 (age 38)
- Height: 1.82 m (5 ft 11 1/2 in)
- Position: Midfielder

Senior career*
Years	Team	Apps	(Gls)
2007–2008	DYuSSh-Dynamo Bryansk		
2008	FC Dynamo Bryansk	10	(0)
2009	FC Dynamo Bryansk	5	(0)
2010	DYuSSh-Dynamo Bryansk		
2014	FC Partizan Bryansk		
2015	FC UchKhoz Kokino		
- * Club domestic league appearances and goals

Dmitry Vladimirovich Klitsov (Russian: Дмитрий Владимирович Клицов; born 13 February 1988) is a former Russian professional association football player.

== Club career ==
He played in the Russian Football National League for FC Dynamo Bryansk in 2008.

== See also ==
- Football in Russia
