= Dmitry Golubev (surgeon) =

Soviet surgeon (1906–1991)

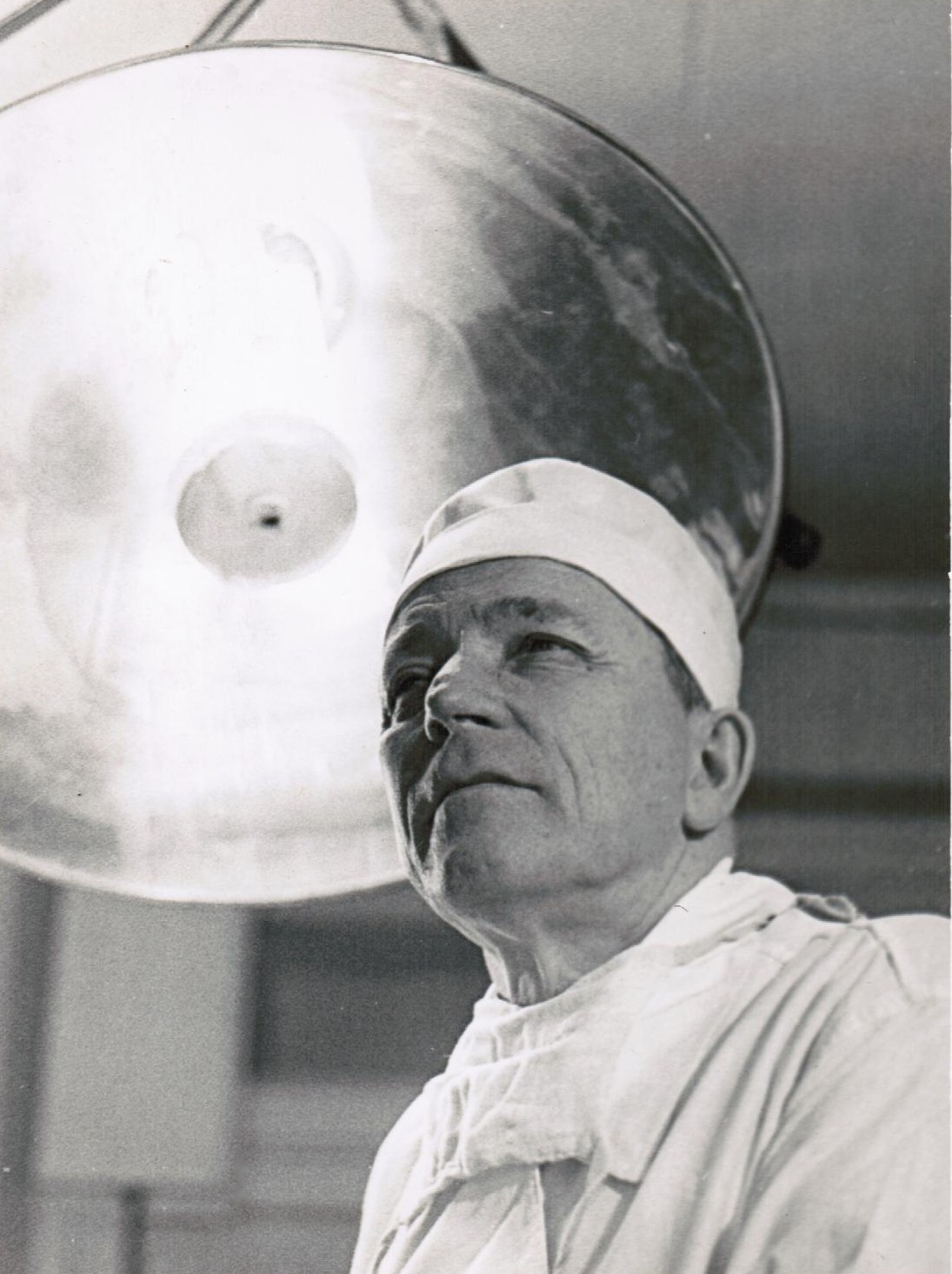
- Born: Dmitry Pavlovich Golubev; 29 September 1906; Parfenyevo, Kologrivsky Uyezd, Kostroma Governorate, Russian Empire
- Died: 5 June 1991 (aged 84); Yaroslavl, Russian SFSR, Soviet Union
- Education: Astrakhan State Medical Academy
- Occupation: Surgeon
- Awards: Hero of Socialist Labour

Dmitry Pavlovich Golubev (Russian: Дмитрий Павлович Голубев; September 29 (O.S. October 12), 1906 – June 5, 1991) was a Soviet surgeon. Hero of Socialist Labour (1969).

Golubev was the thirteenth child in the family of Russian Orthodox archpriest Pavel who lived in the village of Parfenyevo in the Kologrivsky Uyezd of Kostroma Governorate.

Golubev graduated from the Astrakhan Medical School in 1928. He started his career as a medical doctor in a small district hospital at the Prosnitsa railroad station town (currently in Kirov Oblast). He was the first physician in the region. Two years later, he was transferred to Kostroma, where he worked as a surgeon at the district hospital. Then he was transferred to Bolshiye Soli where he worked for about ten years as the Chief Doctor of the local hospital.

He married Nina Vasilyevna, also a physician who later was awarded the title of Distinguished Medical Doctor of the Russian Federation. Their daughter Galina was born in 1937. She also became a surgeon.

Dr. Golubev served as a military surgeon in the Soviet-Finnish War and World War II. His awards for his service were three Orders of the Red Star (autumn 1939, spring 1943, and 1944) and two Orders of the Patriotic War of the Second Degree.

After the end of World War II, he served about thirteen years in Germany and Poland as the Chief Surgeon of the Northern Group of the Soviet Army. He retired from the army with the rank of Colonel. After returning to his homeland in 1962, Golubev became the head of the surgical department in a major Yaroslavl hospital. He continued his work until 1977. Golubev also served as the Chief Surgeon of the city of Yaroslavl.

For his work after the war, Golubev was awarded the Order of the Red Banner of Labor, and he was the only medical doctor in Yaroslavl Oblast to be honored with the highest title of the Hero of Socialist Labor (1969). Golubev lived 84 years practicing medicine until his last years.

Overall, Golubev performed over 12,000 surgeries.

A marble memorial plaque honoring the Hero-surgeon Golubev was installed on the outside wall of the hospital main building in 2007.

== Sources ==
- Колодин Н. Н. Мысли вслух [Голубев Д. П.] // Ярославские эскулапы. — Ярославль: Канцлер, 2008. — Т. 2. Наследники. — С. 63–69. — 380 с. — (Этюды о былом). — 150 экз. — ISBN 978-5-91730-005-4 (in Russian)
- В медсанчасти НПЗ открыли мемориальную доску в память о Дмитрии Голубеве. ГТРК «Ярославия», 10.09.2007. (in Russian)
- В ярославской больнице установлена мемориальная доска в честь хирурга Дмитрия Голубева. Медицинский вестник, 10.09.2007. (in Russian)
- Archive photographs
