= Dmitry Ioffe =

Israeli mathematician (1963–2020)

- דמיטרי יופה
- Born: 5 April 1963; Moscow, Russian SFSR, Soviet Union
- Died: 1 October 2020 (aged 57); Haifa, Israel
- Education: Technion
- Scientific career
- Fields: Mathematics
- Doctoral advisor: Ross Pinsky

Dmitry (Dima) Ioffe (Hebrew: דמיטרי יופה, Russian: Дмитрий Иоффе; 5 April 1963 – 1 October 2020) was an Israeli mathematician, specializing in probability theory.

== Biography ==
Dmitry Ioffe obtained his diploma from the Moscow Mining Institute in 1985 and his PhD in mathematics in 1991 from the Technion, under the supervision of Ross Pinsky. He then spent a post-doc at the University of California, Davis and the Courant Institute. He was an assistant professor at Northwestern University (1993-1995) and a researcher at the Weierstrass Institute of Analysis and Stochastics (WIAS) in Berlin (1995-1997), before returning to the Technion, where he spent the rest of his life as professor. From 2014, he was the incumbent of the Alexander Goldberg chair in management sciences.

== Scientific work ==
Ioffe made fundamental contributions to several areas of statistical mechanics, including random interface models, interacting particle systems, polymers in random environments, random perturbations of dynamical systems, metastability and homogenization. In particular, he extended the Dobrushin-Kotecky-Shlosman two dimensional Wulff construction to the full range of subcritical temperatures and developed with Bodineau and Velenik a robust analytic alternative that worked also in higher dimension. With collaborators, he developed the Ornstein-Zernike theory (at temperatures above criticality) and introduced a diamond representation for a range of models including self-avoiding walks, Bernoulli percolation, Ising ferromagnets and polymers. He also made important contributions to the analysis of quantum spin systems and metastability.

== Personal life ==
Ioffe's family applied for permission to leave the USSR for Israel in 1976 but was refused and hence he became refusenik. It was only in 1987, following a hunger strike by his father, mathematician Alexander Ioffe, that Dmitry and his family were allowed to emigrate.

== Prizes and honors ==
Ioffe got the Prix de l’Institut Henri Poincaré (2005) and a Humboldt research award (2011).

== Selected publications ==
- Ioffe, Dmitry (1995). "Exact large deviation bounds up to T_{c} for the Ising model in two dimensions". Probability Theory and Related Fields. 102 (3): 313–330. doi:10.1007/BF01192464. S2CID 1332517.
- Ioffe, Dmitry; Schonmann, Roberto (1998). "Dobrushin-Kotecky-Shlosman theorem up to the critical temperature". Communications in Mathematical Physics. 199 (1): 117–167. Bibcode:1998CMaPh.199..117I. doi:10.1007/s002200050497. S2CID 11896158.
- Bodineau, Thierry; Ioffe, Dmitry; Velenik, Yvan (2001). "Winterbottom construction for finite range ferromagnetic models: an L1-approach". Journal of Statistical Physics. 105: 93–131. arXiv:math/0101174. doi:10.1023/A:1012277926007.
- Campanino, Massimo; Ioffe, Dmitry; Velenik, Yvan (2003). "Ornstein-Zernike theory for finite range Ising models above T_{c}". Probability Theory and Related Fields. 125 (3): 305–349. arXiv:math/0111274. doi:10.1007/s00440-002-0229-z. S2CID 18054507.
- Ioffe, Dmitry (2009). "Stochastic geometry of classical and quantum Ising models". Methods of Contemporary Mathematical Statistical Physics. Lecture Notes in Mathematics. Vol. 2144. pp. 87–127. arXiv:math-ph/0610025. doi:10.1007/978-3-540-92796-9_2. ISBN 978-3-540-92795-2. S2CID 119670695.
- Ioffe, Dmitry; Velenik, Yvan (2012). "Crossing random walks and stretched polymers at weak disorder". The Annals of Probability. 40 (2): 209–235. arXiv:1002.4289. doi:10.1214/10-AOP625. S2CID 54771817.
- Bianchi, Alessandra; Bovier, Anton; Ioffe, Dmitry (2012). "Pointwise estimates and exponential laws in metastable systems via coupling methods". The Annals of Probability. 40: 339–371. arXiv:0909.1242. doi:10.1214/10-AOP622. S2CID 14138474.
- Ioffe, Dmitry (2015). "Multidimensional Random Polymers: A Renewal Approach". Random Walks, Random Fields, and Disordered Systems. Lecture Notes in Mathematics. Vol. 11. pp. 339–369. arXiv:1412.0229. doi:10.1007/978-3-319-19339-7_4. ISBN 978-3-319-19338-0. S2CID 117484180.
