= Dmitry Kopylov =

Russian serial killer (born 1988)

- Born: Dmitry Nikolayevich Kopylov; 2 March 1988 (age 38); Krasnoye Pole, Chelyabinsk Oblast, RSFSR
- Other name: "The Youth Maniac"
- Convictions: Murder x5 Attempted murder x2 Rape
- Penalty: 10 years

Details
- Victims: 5
- Span of crimes: 2004–2005
- Country: Russia
- State: Chelyabinsk
- Date apprehended: September 2005

Dmitry Nikolayevich Kopylov (Russian: Дмитрий Николаевич Копылов; born 2 March 1988), known as The Youth Maniac (Russian: Маньяк-малолетка), is a Russian serial killer and rapist who killed four women and one man around the Chelyabinsk Oblast from 2004 to 2005. He is noted for the fact that he committed all of his crimes before reaching the age of majority and that he is one of the youngest serial killers in modern Russian history.

== Biography ==
Dmitry Nikolayevich Kopylov was born on 2 March 1988, in the village of Krasnoye Pole, Chelyabinsk Oblast. The only son of poor alcoholics, Kopylov's mother died from heart failure in the early 1990s, and not long after, Kopylov's father was reported for encouraging his son to drink alcohol. As a result, the young boy was taken away by social services and put in an orphanage.

During his stay there, Kopylov became increasingly impulsive and violent, leading to him being repeatedly disciplined by staff for committing various crimes and gaining a reputation as a bully. According to his father, he would often bring kittens and hamsters from the local market, which he would then torture to death.

Kopylov eventually dropped out of school after completing the fifth grade, but as he was fond of reading, he was considered one of the most erudite children in the orphanage. In the early 2000s, Dmitry's father recovered from his alcohol addiction and filed a court lawsuit to have his parental rights reinstated. The lawsuit proved successful, and Kopylov was allowed to move in with his father, who at the time lived in the Sosnovsky District.

== Murders ==
The murders began in June 2004. As victims, Kopylov chose single women he spotted in deserted areas near forest parks, whom he then threatened at gunpoint and attacked with knives, stones, pieces of metal rods, pipes and animal bones. All of his victims were subjected to violent sexual acts, with one of them having a lit cigarette burned on her genitalia.

Kopylov's first victim was a 40-year-old woman he confronted near some railroad tracks, whom he hit on the head with a stone and then stabbed multiple times with a knife. After she died, he stole her jewellery and personal items. In January 2005, he struck a 40-year-old woman on the head, but she fiercely resisted him and began to shout, forcing Kopylov to simply steal her items and flee. This victim later provided a description of her attacker to the authorities.

In May of that year, Kopylov attacked a 33-year-old woman in the woods, but despite his threats, the victim fiercely resisted him and managed to escape. The following month, Kopylov stabbed to death a 66-year-old pensioner, inflicting several stab wounds to her chest and head. In July, he killed a 20-year-old woman by beating her to death with rebar.

A month later, Kopylov attacked a 76-year-old woman in the woods near a ski lodge in the Kurchatovsky District. He stabbed the woman 30 times, and after she died, he stole her jewellery and attempted to flee. The killing was witnessed by an elderly goat herder who attempted to flee to safety, but Kopylov caught up with him and stabbed him to death as well.

== Trial and aftermath ==
The murders caused a great public outcry, as a result of which the local prosecutor's office partnered up with the regional prosecutor's office in order to catch the perpetrator. Investigators established early on that the killer was likely underage, judging from the descriptions given by surviving victims. As a known troublemaker with a criminal record, Kopylov was immediately considered a suspect.

In September 2005, the two surviving victims were shown five photos depicting known teenage criminals in an attempt to possibly identify their attacker - when they looked at Kopylov's photo, both claimed that it was him. Not long after, he was detained at his father's house and lodged in a local jail. Although he scrupulously destroyed evidence from the crime scenes, Kopylov voluntarily confessed to the murders and assaults.

Shortly after his confession, Kopylov was ordered to undergo a psychiatric evaluation, the results of which determined that he was sane to stand trial. On 4 August 2006, the Chelyabinsk Regional Court found Kopylov guilty on all charges and sentenced him to 10 years imprisonment, the maximum penalty available for juvenile offenders in Russia.

Kopylov was released in the mid-2010s after serving his entire prison sentence.

== LBO pedophile case ==
In 2020 , a young man named Dmitry Kopylov was arrested in a pedophile network case. Kopylov, under nick name Lover Boy Only (LBO) kidnapped a kid with attempt of murder. Kopylov was sentenced to 19 years imprisonment.

However, this appears to be not Dmitry Nikolayevich Kopylov but a different person with a similar name, as the Dmitry Kopylov in the LBO case is reported to have been 26 years of age in 2020.

== See also ==
- List of youngest killers
- List of Russian serial killers
