= Dmitri Kalugin =

Russian footballer

Personal information
- Full name: Dmitri Rodionovich Kalugin
- Date of birth: 28 March 1998 (age 28)
- Place of birth: Khorol, Russia
- Height: 1.75 m (5 ft 9 in)
- Position: Midfielder

Youth career
- 2004–2007: FC Khorol
- 2007–2009: Dynamo Vladivostok
- 2010–2017: FC Luch Vladivostok

Senior career*
Years	Team	Apps	(Gls)
2017–2020	FC Luch Vladivostok	26	(0)
2020–2021	FC Fakel Voronezh	1	(0)
2020–2021	→ FC Fakel-M Voronezh	20	(4)
2021–2022	FC Dynamo Vladivostok	27	(0)
2023	FC Atom Novovoronezh (amateur)		
2023–2024	FC Dynamo Vladivostok	25	(2)
2025	FC Irkutsk	11	(0)
- * Club domestic league appearances and goals as of 15 June 2025

Dmitri Rodionovich Kalugin (Russian: Дмитрий Родионович Калугин; born 28 March 1998) is a Russian football player.

== Club career ==
He made his debut in the Russian Football National League for FC Luch Vladivostok on 8 August 2018 in a game against FC Nizhny Novgorod.
