= Dmitri Klabukov =

Russian footballer

Personal information
- Full name: Dmitri Vasilyevich Klabukov
- Date of birth: 14 January 1980 (age 46)
- Place of birth: Izhevsk, Russian SFSR
- Height: 1.86 m (6 ft 1 in)
- Positions: Defender; defensive midfielder

Senior career*
Years	Team	Apps	(Gls)
1996–1997	Zenit Izhevsk	49	(3)
1998	KAMAZ-Chally Naberezhnye Chelny	19	(1)
1999–2002	Shinnik Yaroslavl	6	(0)
1999–2000	→ Volgar-Gazprom Astrakhan (loan)	25	(2)
2001	→ Torpedo-MAZ Minsk (loan)	13	(1)
2001	→ Zenit Saint Petersburg (loan)	0	(0)
2002	→ Metalist Kharkiv (loan)	3	(0)
2002	→ Metalist-2 Kharkiv	1	(0)
2002	Torpedo-MAZ Minsk	0	(0)
2002	→ Zagłębie Lubin (loan)	5	(2)
2002	→ Zagłębie Lubin II (loan)	3	(0)
2003–2004	Zagłębie Lubin	11	(0)
2003	Zagłębie Lubin II	11	(4)

International career
2001	Russia U21	1	(0)
- * Club domestic league appearances and goals

Dmitri Vasilyevich Klabukov (Russian: Дмитрий Васильевич Клабуков; born 14 January 1980) is a Russian former professional footballer.
