= Dmitri Goldenkov =

Russian ice hockey player

- Born: February 25, 1991 (age 35) Prokopyevsk, Russia
- Height: 5 ft 11 in (180 cm)
- Weight: 183 lb (83 kg; 13 st 1 lb)
- Position: Forward
- Shoots: Left
- KHL team: HC Dynamo Moscow
- NHL draft: Undrafted
- Playing career: 2010–present

Dmitri Yevgenyevich Goldenkov (Russian: Дмитрий Евгеньевич Голденков; born February 25, 1991) is a Russian professional ice hockey player.

Goldenkov played with HC Dynamo Moscow of the Kontinental Hockey League (KHL) during the 2012–13 season.
