= Dmitry Mulkevich =

Belarusian footballer

Personal information
- Date of birth: 26 July 1996 (age 30)
- Place of birth: Brest, Belarus
- Height: 1.67 m (5 ft 5 1/2 in)
- Position: Midfielder

Youth career
- 2012–2014: Dinamo Brest

Senior career*
Years	Team	Apps	(Gls)
2014–2016	Dinamo Brest	3	(0)
2015	→ Kobrin (loan)	14	(0)
2017	Granit Mikashevichi	26	(1)
2018–2019	Rukh Brest	30	(9)
2020–2021	Volna Pinsk	25	(2)
2021–2022	Malorita	13	(5)
2022	GKS Wikielec	21	(3)
2023–2025	Niva Dolbizno	94	(17)
- * Club domestic league appearances and goals as of 7 April 2026

Dmitry Vadimovich Mulkevich (Belarusian: Дзмітрый Вадзімавіч Мулькевіч; Russian: Дмитрий Вадимович Мулькевич; born 26 July 1996) is a Belarusian professional footballer who plays as a midfielder.
