= Dmitri Kostyayev =

Russian footballer

Personal information
- Full name: Dmitri Aleksandrovich Kostyayev
- Date of birth: 13 December 1989 (age 36)
- Height: 1.76 m (5 ft 9 in)
- Position: Midfielder

Senior career*
Years	Team	Apps	(Gls)
2006–2008	FC Yunit Samara	60	(3)
2009–2011	FC Krylia Sovetov Samara	2	(0)
2012	FC Sergiyevsk		
2013	FC Syzran-2003	17	(0)
2014–2015	FC Sergiyevsk		
- * Club domestic league appearances and goals

Dmitri Aleksandrovich Kostyayev (Russian: Дмитрий Александрович Костяев; born 13 December 1989) is a former Russian professional footballer.

== Club career ==
He made his professional debut in the Russian Second Division in 2006 for FC Yunit Samara.
