= Dmitry Ignatenko (footballer, born 1969) =

Russian footballer

Dmitri Ignatenko
Personal information
- Full name: Dmitri Vladimirovich Ignatenko
- Date of birth: 27 January 1969 (age 57)
- Place of birth: Leningrad, Russian SFSR
- Height: 1.80 m (5 ft 11 in)
- Positions: Defender; midfielder

Youth career
- FC Zenit Leningrad

Senior career*
Years	Team	Apps	(Gls)
1985	FC LOMO Leningrad (amateur)		
1985–1989	FC Zenit Leningrad	9	(0)
1990	FC Bashselmash Neftekamsk	8	(1)
1990	FC Zenit Izhevsk	2	(0)
1990	FC Svetotekhnika Saransk	1	(0)
1991	FC Shakhter Karagandy	27	(2)
1992–1993	FC Luch Vladivostok	57	(0)
1994	FC Lokomotiv St. Petersburg	28	(4)
1995	FC Luch Vladivostok	0	(0)
- * Club domestic league appearances and goals

Dmitri Vladimirovich Ignatenko (Russian: Дмитрий Владимирович Игнатенко; born 27 January 1969) is a former Russian football player.
