= Dmitry Aleksandriysky =

Russian footballer and coach

Personal information
- Full name: Dmitry Yevgenyevich Aleksandriysky
- Date of birth: 13 August 1968 (age 58)
- Height: 1.78 m (5 ft 10 in)
- Positions: Defender; midfielder; forward

Senior career*
Years	Team	Apps	(Gls)
1991–2004	FC Spartak Kostroma	349	(32)

Managerial career
- 2008–2009: FC Spartak Kostroma (assistant)
- 2010: FC Spartak Kostroma
- 2011–2013: FC Spartak Kostroma (assistant)
- 2013: FC Spartak Kostroma
- 2013–2014: FC Spartak Kostroma (assistant)
- 2014: FC Torpedo Vladimir (assistant)
- 2017–2018: FC Spartak Kostroma
- * Club domestic league appearances and goals

Dmitry Yevgenyevich Aleksandriysky (Russian: Дми́трий Евге́ньевич Александри́йский; born 13 August 1968) is a Russian professional association football coach and a former player.
