= Dmitry Khamkin =

Russian luger (born 1985)

Dmitriy Vladimirovich Khamkin (Russian: Дмитрий Владимирович Хамкин, born 22 August 1985 in Chusovoy, Perm Krai) is a Russian luger who has competed since 2002. He competed in the men's doubles event at the 2006 Winter Olympics in Turin, but crashed during the first run and did not finish.

Khamkin finished 16th in the men's doubles event at the 2006 FIL European Luge Championships in Winterberg, Germany.
