= Dmitry and Natalia Baksheevy =

Russian criminal duo

- Born: Dmitry - January 28, 1982; Natalia - January 25, 1975 (age 51); Krasnodar Krai, RSFSR
- Died: Dmitry - February 16, 2020 (aged 38); Krasnodar Krai, Russian Federation
- Other names: "The Krasnodar Cannibals" "The family of cannibals"
- Convictions: February 2019; June 2019

Details
- Country: Russia
- State: Krasnodar Krai
- Date apprehended: September 24, 2017

Dmitry Baksheev (Russian: Дмитрий Бакшеев; January 28, 1982 – February 16, 2020) and Natalia Baksheeva (Russian: Наталья Бакшеева), née Shaporenko (Russian: Шапоренко; born January 25, 1975), are a couple from Krasnodar who were accused of killing a local woman. According to rumors, the Baksheevs are also responsible for a series of murders and cannibalistic acts. The couple were convicted of the murder and imprisoned in 2019.

== Biography ==
Dmitry was born in 1982, and Natalia in 1975. Natalia worked for some time as a senior nurse in the sanitation department of the Krasnodar Higher Military Aviation School of AK Serov pilots, but was dismissed due to chronic alcoholism. Dmitry had been tried for robbery and car theft, but by the time of the murder, all of his convictions had been extinguished. He worked as an apartment repairman and a general worker. The Baksheevs had lived together since 2012 in a school dormitory, the room being inherited by Natalia from her previous husband. The couple led an antisocial lifestyle.

The Baksheevs' crimes were discovered by accident: Dmitry lost his phone, on which there were pictures of him with human remains, even holding a severed human hand in his mouth, in one of them. Road workers later found the phone and immediately reported it to the police. At the interrogation, he claimed that he had seen the remains in the bushes, but later confessed to killing a woman.

As the investigation later found out, the victim of the Baksheevs was a resident of Krasnodar, Elena Vakhrusheva (born March 5, 1982, in Omutninsk). The murder occurred on September 8 during a joint alcohol drinking session, when a sudden quarrel began between Natalia and Elena. Natalia then told her husband to kill her rival, also actively participating in the murder herself. Elena died as a result of multiple stab wounds. Then the Baksheevs dismembered the corpse, keeping some of the remains in their home, and throwing away others in the surrounding area.

During the investigation into the activities in the Baksheev household, fragments of a human body in saline solution, food, and frozen meat parts of unknown origin were found. In the basement of the house and the adjoining territory, the remains of the deceased's body were found and seized, while the food and frozen meat fragments were sent for examination.

Initially, the criminal case was initiated with a murder charge, but the Baksheevs were later charged with group murder. The case was referred to the first department for investigation of special importance.

On September 28, Vadim Bugaenko, the head of the Investigative Department of the Russian Democratic Republic for the Krasnodar Krai, told reporters that the remains found in the Baksheevs' apartment belonged to one person.

Also, a procedural check was initiated on the fact of leaked photos from Dmitry's phone, which led to speculations about a family of serial killer-cannibals that operated in the city.

== Conviction ==
Natalia Baksheeva was convicted in February 2019. The court found her guilty of incitement to murder. She was sentenced to 10 years in a penal colony and 1.5 years in prison. Natalia appealed the decision, but the sentence remained unchanged. On June 28, 2019, Dmitry Baksheev was sentenced to 12 years and 2 months in a maximum-security prison. In addition, he was prescribed compulsory supervision and treatment by a psychiatrist. On February 16, 2020, Dimitri Baksheev died of untreated type 1 diabetes while in custody.

== Rumors and speculation ==
The story quickly overgrew with rumors, according to which the couple had been hunting people since 1999. The rumors also said that the cannibals tortured their victims before killing them, and made various dishes from the corpses, keeping the remains canned. According to initial reports, Natalia allegedly supplied the canned human meat to the school where she worked. Later, it was suggested that the Baksheevs distributed such canned food to the Krasnodar catering establishments, but those rumors were quickly refuted. Also, the media published a rumor that Dmitry Baksheev allegedly confessed to a murder committed in 2012, and Natalia to 30 murders. However, the Investigative Committee stated several times that they had no such data on a series of murders for cannibalism by a married couple and that in the Baksheev case there was only one murder. Finally, it was also rumored that during the search of the Baksheevs' apartment, 19 pieces of human skin, 7 body parts, photos of eerie dishes, canned food with human meat, including mammary glands, and even cooking recipes for humans were seized.

== See also ==
- List of incidents of cannibalism
- Sergey Golovkin
- Nikolai Dzhumagaliev
- Alexander Spesivtsev
- Aleksey Sukletin
