= Dmitry Chebotayev =

Russian photojournalist (1978–2007)

- Born: January 20, 1978; Moscow, RSFSR, USSR
- Died: May 6, 2007 (aged 29); Diyala Governorate, Iraq
- Cause of death: Bombing
- Education: Moscow State University of Technology "STANKIN"
- Occupation: Photojournalist
- Years active: 2003-2007
- Employer: Newsweek (Russian edition)
- Partner: Natalia Kolesnikova
- Parent(s): Vyatcheslav (father), Tatjana (mother)

Dmitry Vyacheslavich Chebotayev (Russian: Дмитрий Вячеславич Чеботаев; 20 January 1978 – 6 May 2007), was a Russian photojournalist for Newsweek magazine (the Russia edition) in Moscow. Chebotayev, 29, was killed when a roadside bomb struck a military vehicle in the Diyala Governorate in Iraq during what was known as the Diyala campaign. He had been on assignment in Baghdad.

== Personal life ==
Chebotayev was known for his cheerful demeanor. He was an attractive young man who enjoyed taking risks and encountering danger. His first interest in life was sports; however, he suffered from a spinal ailment when he was 24 that forced him to give up a career in athletics. Chebotayev loved to snowboard and was also a cyclist. He was not married, but he did have a girlfriend of 6 years named Natalia Kolensnikova.

== Career ==
After giving up a career in sports, Chebotayev became depressed. His girlfriend, Natalia, encouraged him to become a photographer. The two purchased a camera and Chebotayev developed a passion for photography. He began freelancing for PhotoXPress in 2003. Two years later, he went from the Russian news photo agency to becoming a contract photographer of Newsweek magazine, which he was working for at the time he was killed.

== Death ==
Dmitry Chebotayev was killed in Diyala, which is shown in relation to the capital city Baghdad.

Chebotayev took his first trip to Iraq in March 2007. He was embedded in the U.S. units in Baghdad, and planned to stay until May. Chebotayev experienced war firsthand when the Humvee he was riding in was hit by small firearms. He was not injured though. Chebotayev would take photos of civilians and troops indoors or at night. He was trying to capture the experience of war. On Sunday, May 6, Chebotayev left the base with a platoon of four Stryker military vehicles. He spent several hours at the Iraq police station with troops who had picked up wounded police officers. Helicopters from above noticed armed men at a nearby intersection, and several other locations, supposedly planting a roadside bomb. Chebotayev and the troops left around noon and as the vehicle was patrolling through a littered street, an enormous blast flipped the 37,000 pound vehicle upside down. The interior was also destroyed. The explosion killed Chebotayev and six American soldiers. That evening his remains were loaded onto a Black Hawk helicopter and transported to his family in Russia.

== Impact ==
According to the Committee to Protect Journalists, Chebotayev's death marked the first time that a Russian journalist was killed in the Iraq War.

== Reactions ==
In a statement released by Koïchiro Matsuura, who was director-general of UNESCO, "The appalling list of journalists and media professionals who have died in Iraq is growing ever longer."
