= Dmitry Balmin =

Russian ice hockey player

- Born: July 15, 1970 (age 56) Kazan, Soviet Union
- Height: 5 ft 11 in (180 cm)
- Weight: 180 lb (82 kg; 12 st 12 lb)
- Position: Defence
- Shot: Left
- Played for: Neftekhimik Nizhnekamsk; Ak Bars Kazan
- Playing career: 1987–2008

Dmitry Anatolievich Balmin (Russian: Дми́трий Анато́льевич Балмин; born July 15, 1970) is a retired Russian ice hockey defender. He played 16 seasons in Ak Bars (Itil, SK imeni Uritskovo). He played nearly 900 games for Tatarstanian teams.

Balmin was Russian champion in 1998. He also plays for HC Neftekhimik Nizhnekamsk.

== Career statistics ==
			Regular season					Playoffs
Season	Team	League	GP	G	A	Pts	PIM	GP	G	A	Pts	PIM
1987-88	SC Uritskogo Kazan	USSR-2	34	0	3	3	16	—	—	—	—	—
1988-89	SC Uritskogo Kazan	USSR-2	72	5	3	8	16	—	—	—	—	—
1989-90	SKA Sverdlovsk	USSR-2	56	6	8	14	45	—	—	—	—	—
1990-91	Metallurg Serov	USSR-2	68	7	9	16	58	—	—	—	—	—
1991-92	Itil Kazan	USSR	26	0	0	0	10	—	—	—	—	—
1992-93	Itil Kazan	IHL	29	4	3	7	18	—	—	—	—	—
1993-94	Itil Kazan	IHL	43	3	7	10	42	—	—	—	—	—
1994-95	Itil Kazan	IHL	42	2	12	14	80	—	—	—	—	—
1995-96	Ak Bars Kazan	IHL	52	5	11	16	34	—	—	—	—	—
1996-97	Ak Bars Kazan	RSL	46	4	9	13	32	—	—	—	—	—
1997-98	Ak Bars Kazan	RSL	46	6	6	12	24	—	—	—	—	—
1998-99	Ak Bars Kazan	RSL	42	4	11	15	14	19	1	2	3	25
1999-00	Ak Bars Kazan	RSL	35	3	6	9	36	5	0	2	2	4
2000-01	Ak Bars Kazan	RSL	44	2	8	10	30	4	0	0	0	0
2001-02	Ak Bars Kazan	RSL	47	1	17	18	20	11	0	2	2	4
2002-03	Ak Bars Kazan	RSL	46	4	12	16	28	5	0	0	0	4
2003-04	Ak Bars Kazan	RSL	60	4	15	19	30	8	0	1	1	2
2004-05	Ak Bars Kazan	RSL	41	3	8	11	12	—	—	—	—	—
2004-05	Neftekhimik Nizhnekamsk	RSL	10	0	1	1	0	3	0	0	0	0
2005-06	Neftekhimik Nizhnekamsk	RSL	51	1	5	6	53	5	0	0	0	6
2006-07	Neftekhimik Nizhnekamsk	RSL	53	2	14	16	71	3	0	0	0	0
2007-08	Neftekhimik Nizhnekamsk	RSL	34	0	6	6	22	5	0	0	0	2
Totals
