= Dmitry Arsenyuk =

Russian ice hockey player (born 1995)

- Born: May 25, 1995 (age 31) Magnitogorsk, Russia
- Height: 6 ft 0 in (183 cm)
- Weight: 187 lb (85 kg; 13 st 5 lb)
- Position: Forward
- Shoots: Left
- team Former teams: Free Agent; Metallurg Magnitogorsk; Yunost Minsk
- Playing career: 2014–present

Dmitry Dmitrievich Arsenyuk (Russian: Дмитрий Дмитриевич Арсенюк; born May 25, 1995) is a Russian professional ice hockey forward. He is currently an unrestricted free agent. He was drafted in the fifth round, 147th overall, by Metallurg Magnitogorsk in the 2012 KHL Junior Draft.

Arsenyuk made his Kontinental Hockey League debut playing with Metallurg Magnitogorsk during the 2014–15 KHL season.

== Career statistics ==
| | | | Regular season | | | | | Playoffs |
| Season | Team | League | GP | G | A | Pts | PIM | GP | G | A | Pts | PIM |
|---|---|---|---|---|---|---|---|---|---|---|---|---|
| 2012–13 | Stalnye Lisy | MHL | 53 | 5 | 8 | 13 | 22 | — | — | — | — | — |
| 2013–14 | Stalnye Lisy | MHL | 54 | 15 | 34 | 49 | 34 | 8 | 4 | 2 | 6 | 12 |
| 2014–15 | Stalnye Lisy | MHL | 27 | 19 | 20 | 39 | 61 | 8 | 4 | 7 | 11 | 10 |
| 2014–15 | Yuzhny Ural Orsk | VHL | 22 | 2 | 6 | 8 | 16 | — | — | — | — | — |
| 2014–15 | Metallurg Magnitogorsk | KHL | 2 | 0 | 0 | 0 | 0 | — | — | — | — | — |
| 2015–16 | Stalnye Lisy | MHL | 9 | 8 | 8 | 16 | 14 | 8 | 4 | 5 | 9 | 40 |
| 2015–16 | Yuzhny Ural Orsk | VHL | 19 | 6 | 2 | 8 | 4 | — | — | — | — | — |
| 2015–16 | Metallurg Magnitogorsk | KHL | 11 | 0 | 1 | 1 | 0 | — | — | — | — | — |
| 2016–17 | Rubin Tyumen | VHL | 39 | 6 | 3 | 9 | 29 | 5 | 0 | 0 | 0 | 2 |
| 2017–18 | Sputnik Nizhny Tagil | VHL | 1 | 0 | 0 | 0 | 0 | — | — | — | — | — |
| 2017–18 | Gornyak Uchaly | VHL | 44 | 7 | 19 | 26 | 34 | — | — | — | — | — |
| 2018–19 | Gornyak Uchaly | VHL | 54 | 19 | 18 | 37 | 48 | — | — | — | — | — |
| 2019–20 | HC Yugra | VHL | 43 | 12 | 19 | 31 | 32 | 9 | 0 | 2 | 2 | 0 |
| 2020–21 | Dizel Penza | VHL | 46 | 12 | 21 | 33 | 55 | 8 | 1 | 2 | 3 | 8 |
| 2021–22 | Yunost Minsk | BLR | 40 | 16 | 8 | 24 | 67 | 5 | 0 | 2 | 2 | 2 |
| KHL totals | | | 13 | 0 | 1 | 1 | 0 | — | — | — | — | — |
