= Dmitry Mazo =

Israeli architect (born 1963)

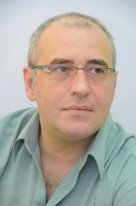

Dmitry Mazo (Hebrew: דמיטרי מזו; born October 4, 1963, Moscow) is an Israeli architect, professor, Master of Architecture and Urban Planning.

== Background and career ==
From 1970 to 1980, he studied at school No.127. From 1980 to 1986, he studied at Moscow Architectural Institute, at the Department of Residential and Public Buildings, group of Prof. B.G. Barkhin, Prof. A.B. Nekrasov and M. Belov, where he earned his diploma of architect ( MSc). At the age of 24, he became the youngest member of the USSR Union of Architects. From 1986 to 1990, he worked at the CNIIEP (Central Research & Design Institute) of Sports Facilities and Leisure Centers named after B. Mezentsev, in Moscow. From 1990 to 1991, he worked at B. Baruch-J. Salamon Israeli architectural bureau in Haifa, and from 1991 to 1992, at Yaacov and Ora Yaar architectural bureau in Tel Aviv.

In 1992, he founded architectural studio DMazo, where he is still working nowadays. The studio is located in Tel Aviv and implements projects in different areas, including architecture and urban planning. From 1994 to 1995, Dmitry was holding the position of Chief Architect for urban construction of Tel Aviv and the Central District of Israel. From 1995 to 2000, he was heading the group for Urban Planning of Tel Aviv. From 2000 to 2006, he was holding the position of the Chief Architect of Hod HaSharon. In 2006, he was appointed the State Inspector for relocation of settlements from the Gaza Strip. In 2012, he got appointed the State Inspector for reinforcement of buildings and preparation of Israel for earthquakes. Since 2016, he has been working as the State Inspector for construction of the LRT lines in Tel Aviv. Dmitry Mazo is also engaged in teaching; from 1998 to 2006, he was teaching classes in architecture in the Israeli settlement of Ariel in the West Bank (later, Ariel University). In 2010, he was awarded the title of Professor of the UNESCO Academy of Architecture.

== Works ==
- 1986, «Playhouse» Touring theater in Amsterdam, the Netherlands. — 2nd prize at the OISTATT competition
- Universal club of leisure and sports- 1st prize * Reconstruction of Mayakovsky Theatre, Moscow — Winner of the «Best Project of 1986» competition * Conference Center on the spit of the Moskva river, 1986 — Laureate of the competition at the Biennale in Sofia * Music and Drama Theater in Magadan, 1987, 1st prize * Administrative center of the settlement of Gzhel, Russia,1987 — 2nd prize * Young Spectator's Theater in Murmansk,1987 — 2nd prize * Leisure center in Darkhan, Mongolia, 1987 - 2nd prize * Leisure center in Bakuriani, Georgia, 1987. SKIA prize * Puppet theater in Kaluga, 1987- 2nd prize
- Administrative center of the municipal settlement of Gzhel, 1988. * In a residential district, in 700 — apartments in Volsk, Russia, 1988. Music Theater in Vologda. Russia.
- Youth Leisure Center in Volsk, Russia. * Renovation of Tate Britain in London - Caro and Hockney exhibitions, the United Kingdom, 1989.
- Master plan of the new town of Tel-Zafit, Israel.
- Conference Center in Haifa, 1990
- Design of Tel-Zafit districts, Israel, 1991.
- Draft plan of a new town — Tel-Felicia, 1991 * Planning of a residential district in El’ad, 1992 * Competition for governmental buildings in Berlin, Germany, 1993
- 1994 Master plan of the new settlement of Har-Adar, Jerusalem.
- «The Future of Tel Aviv Housing" Competition. Proposal for improvement of development in Tel Aviv. – 1st prize. * 1996 planning of «В» district in Har-Adar settlement, Jerusalem.
- 1997 project of carpet construction. Har-Adar; Cottage village in Azur, Israel.
- 2000 project of the Tali School, Hod HaSharon, Israel.
- General plan of Hod HaSharon. Development plan until the year 2020 for the population of up to 150000 people. Israel.
- 2002 Project of expansion of the Entertainment and Cultural Center in Hod HaSharon, Israel
- Residential district for 4,200 apartments, Hod HaSharon, Israel.
- Plan of the downtown Hod HaSharon, Israel.
- 2003. Residential district for 7,700 apartments. Hod HaSharon, Israel.
- Synagogue and cultural center in Volgograd, Russia, 2004. * Center of the school district in Ashdod, 2005.
- Design of the central complex of Olympic facilities in Sochi for the Winter Olympics-2014. Russia, 2006. * Complex of the Far Eastern Federal University in Russky island, Vladivostok. The 1st line - APEC Summit facilities - 2008.
- 2009, new above-ground pavilion of «Baksovet» underground station. Baku, Azerbaijan
- The Centre for sports and leisure in Rostov, 2009.
- Museum of music of the Conservatorium in Safed (concept design stage), 2011.
- Construction of residential, commercial and office buildings at Yefet street in Jaffa, 2012.
- Book Network Store (concept design), 2012.
- New Central Bus Station, Tel Aviv (concept design), 2012.
- Park of the National Unity and Reconciliation, MO, Russia.
- Expansion of the central exhibition grounds of Tel Aviv, Israel.
- New Central Bus Station of Tel Aviv, Israel.
- Sports center with seating for 300, Moscow, Russia
- Residential, commercial and office buildings, Jaffa, Tel Aviv, Israel.
- Pavilion of the central underground station, Baku, Azerbaijan.
- Entertainment and Game Center of Torzhok, Russia.
- The general plan of Hod HaSharon, Israel.
- Residential areas in Israel, Russia, Ukraine.
- Industrial zones and industrial parks in Israel and Russia.

== Awards ==
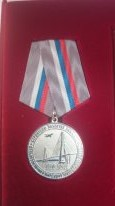

Winner and finalist of 18 architectural and urban construction competitions, including:

- Academic Mayakovsky Theatre — the best project of 1986 in the USSR.
- Play House — theater in Amsterdam, the Netherlands — OISTATT prize.
- Future of Tel Aviv House, Israel — first prize.
- Entertainment center in Bakuriani, Georgia — Skia prize.
- Music and Drama Theater in Magadan, USSR — first prize.
- Leisure center in Ashdod, Israel — first prize.
- Administrative and entertainment center of Gzhel, USSR — second prize.
- Leisure center in Darkhan. Mongolia — second prize.

== Family ==
Married. Has two daughters. Currently lives in Ramat-Gan.
