= Kologrivsky Uyezd =

Subdivision of the Russian Empire

Kologrivsky Uyezd (Кологривский уезд) was one of the subdivisions of the Kostroma Governorate of the Russian Empire. It was situated in the northern part of the governorate. Its administrative centre was Kologriv.

== Demographics ==
At the time of the Russian Empire Census of 1897, Kologrivsky Uyezd had a population of 109,575. Of these, 99.9% spoke Russian as their native language.
