= Dmitry Krasilnikov =

Russian footballer

Personal information
- Full name: Dmitry Anatolyevich Krasilnikov
- Date of birth: 7 May 1979 (age 47)
- Place of birth: Gorky, Russian SFSR
- Height: 1.85 m (6 ft 1 in)
- Position: Goalkeeper

Youth career
- SDYuSShOR-8 Nizhny Novgorod

Senior career*
Years	Team	Apps	(Gls)
2000	FC Torpedo-Viktoriya Nizhny Novgorod	1	(0)
2002–2003	FC Torpedo Pavlovo	32	(0)
2004	FC Dynamo Kirov	7	(0)
2006	FC Lokomotiv Kaluga	34	(0)
2007	FC Lobnya-Alla Lobnya	27	(0)
2008	FC Zvezda Serpukhov	34	(0)
2009	FC Nizhny Novgorod	2	(0)
2010–2011	FC Gubkin	42	(0)
2011	FC Dynamo Kostroma	9	(0)
2012–2013	FC Volga Ulyanovsk	27	(0)
2013	FC Metallurg-Oskol Stary Oskol	12	(0)
2014–2017	FC Volga Ulyanovsk	66	(0)
- * Club domestic league appearances and goals

Dmitry Anatolyevich Krasilnikov (Russian: Дми́трий Анато́льевич Краси́льников; born 7 May 1979) is a former Russian professional association football player.

== Club career ==
He played in the Russian Football National League for FC Nizhny Novgorod in 2009.

== Honours ==
- Russian Second Division, Zone Centre best goalkeeper: 2010.
