= Dmitry Maltsev =

Russian ice hockey player

- Born: January 20, 1991 (age 35) Omsk, Russia
- Height: 6 ft 3 in (191 cm)
- Weight: 201 lb (91 kg; 14 st 5 lb)
- Position: Forward
- Shoots: Left
- VHL team Former teams: Metallurg Novokuznetsk; Lokomotiv Yaroslavl; Avangard Omsk; Salavat Yulaev Ufa; HC Sochi
- Playing career: 2011–present

Dmitry Olegovich Maltsev (Russian: Дмитрий Олегович Мальцев; born January 20, 1991) is a Russian professional ice hockey forward. He is currently playing with Metallurg Novokuznetsk of the Supreme Hockey League (VHL).

Maltsev made his Kontinental Hockey League (KHL) debut playing with Lokomotiv Yaroslavl during the 2012–13 KHL season.
