= Dmitri Gadalov =

Russian footballer

Personal information
- Full name: Dmitri Nikolayevich Gadalov
- Date of birth: 28 February 1973 (age 53)
- Place of birth: Vyksa, Russian SFSR
- Height: 1.89 m (6 ft 2 1/2 in)
- Position: Defender

Youth career
- FC Metallurg Vyksa

Senior career*
Years	Team	Apps	(Gls)
1991–1992	FC Metallurg Vyksa (amateur)		
1992	FC Torpedo Arzamas	5	(0)
1993–1994	FC Lokomotiv Nizhny Novgorod	5	(0)
1994–1996	FC Torpedo Arzamas	66	(2)
1997	FC Metallurg Vyksa	34	(2)
1998	FC Metallurg Vyksa (amateur)		
1999–2003	FC Metallurg Vyksa	150	(8)
2004	FC Lokomotiv-NN Nizhny Novgorod	22	(0)
2005–2006	FC Metallurg Vyksa (amateur)		
2007	FC Kolyosnik-Metallurg Vyksa		
2008	FC Metallurg Vyksa (amateur)		
- * Club domestic league appearances and goals

Dmitri Nikolayevich Gadalov (Russian: Дмитрий Николаевич Гадалов; born 28 February 1973) is a Russian former football player.
