= Dmitry Klimov =

Russian footballer and coach

Personal information
- Full name: Dmitry Sergeyevich Klimov
- Date of birth: 16 May 1983 (age 43)
- Place of birth: Voronezh, Russian SFSR
- Height: 1.84 m (6 ft 1/2 in)
- Position: Goalkeeper

Team information
- Current team: FC Akron Tolyatti (GK coach)

Senior career*
Years	Team	Apps	(Gls)
2001–2002	FC Fakel Voronezh	0	(0)
2002	FC Lokomotiv Liski	3	(0)
2003–2007	FC Yelets	78	(0)
2007	FC Mordovia Saransk	7	(0)
2008–2009	FC Krasnodar	27	(0)
2009	FC Gazovik Orenburg	6	(0)
2010	FC Fakel Voronezh	7	(0)

Managerial career
- 2013–2014: FC Krasnodar (GK coach)
- 2014–2015: FC Krasnodar (assistant)
- 2015: FC MITOS Novocherkassk (GK coach)
- 2017: FC Zenit Penza (assistant)
- 2018–2019: FC Syzran-2003 (GK coach)
- 2019–2022: FC Volgar Astrakhan (GK coach)
- 2022–: FC Akron Tolyatti (GK coach)
- * Club domestic league appearances and goals

Dmitry Sergeyevich Klimov (Russian: Дми́трий Серге́евич Кли́мов; born 16 May 1983) is a Russian professional association football coach and a former player. He is the goalkeepers' coach at FC Akron Tolyatti.

== Playing career ==
He played in the Russian Football National League for FC Mordovia Saransk in 2007.
