= Dmitri Lagunov =

Russian/Soviet footballer

Personal information
- Full name: Dmitri Alekseyevich Lagunov
- Date of birth: 3 September (O.S. 15 September) 1888
- Date of death: 10 February 1942 (aged 53)
- Place of death: Leningrad, Soviet Union
- Position: Defender

Senior career*
| Years | Team | Apps | (Gls) |
| 1911–1915 | Petrovsky Saint Petersburg | | |
| 1915–1917 | Kolomyagi Saint Petersburg | | |
| 1918–1919 | Sport Petrograd | | |
| 1920–1923 | Petrovsky Leningrad | | |
| 1924–1926 | Spartak Vasileostrovsky Rayon Leningrad | | |
| 1927–1930 | Krasny Sudostroitel Leningrad | | |

International career
| 1913 | Russian Empire | 1 | (0) |
- * Club domestic league appearances and goals

Dmitri Alekseyevich Lagunov (Russian: Дмитрий Алексеевич Лагунов; 15 September [O.S. 3 September] 1888 – 10 February 1942) was a Russian and Soviet football player. He died as a civilian in the Siege of Leningrad during World War II.

== International career ==
Lagunov played his only game for Russia on September 14, 1913 in a friendly against Norway.
