= Dmitri Gavrikov =

Russian footballer

Personal information
- Full name: Dmitri Vladimirovich Gavrikov
- Date of birth: 19 May 1994 (age 32)
- Height: 1.83 m (6 ft 0 in)
- Position: Goalkeeper

Senior career*
Years	Team	Apps	(Gls)
2010	FC NIK-1 Nizhny Novgorod		
2011	FC Nizhny Novgorod-3-Knyaginino		
2012	FC Volgotransgaz Nizhny Novgorod		
2013	FC Khimik-Tosol-Sintez Dzerzhinsk		
2014–2016	FC Khimik Dzerzhinsk	13	(0)
- * Club domestic league appearances and goals

Dmitri Vladimirovich Gavrikov (Russian: Дмитрий Владимирович Гавриков; born 19 May 1994) is a Russian former football player.

== Club career ==
He made his debut in the Russian Football National League for FC Khimik Dzerzhinsk on 30 May 2015 in a game against PFC Krylia Sovetov Samara.
