= Dmitri Konovalov =

Russian physical chemist (1856–1929)

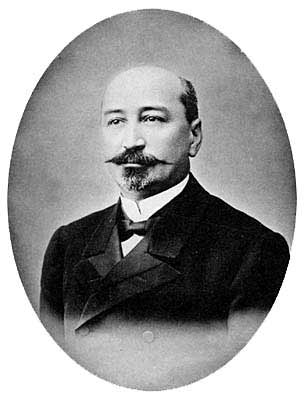

Dmitri Petrovich Konovalov (Russian: Дми́трий Петро́вич Конова́лов; 22 March 1856 – 6 January 1929) was a Russian-Soviet physical chemist who worked on gas-liquid phases of solutions in equilibrium and came up with several rules that were also independently worked on by J. Willard Gibbs and the rules are often called Gibbs-Konovalov rules. They provide the basis for distillation and separation of components that form azeotropes.

== Life and work ==
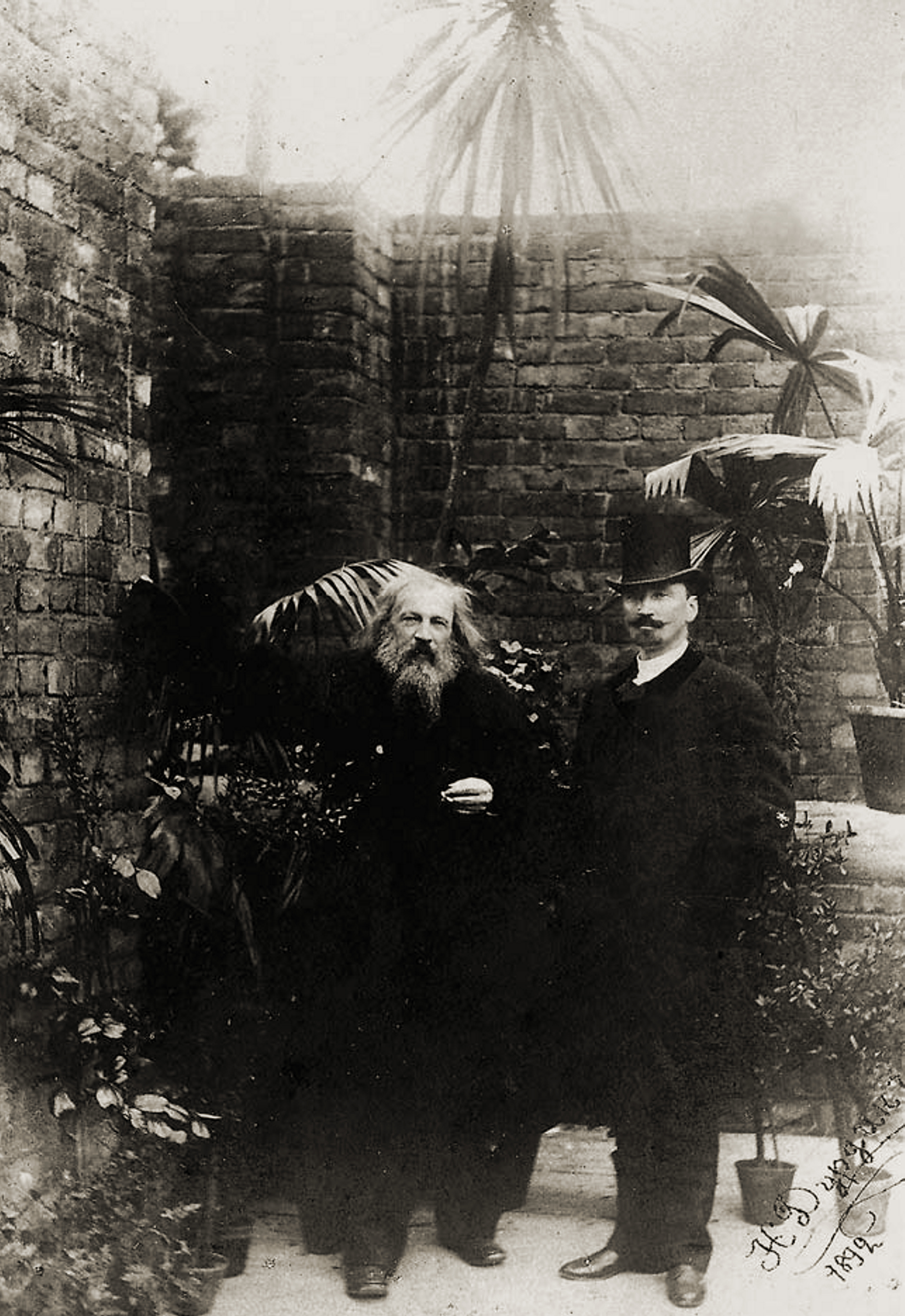
Mendeleev and Konovalov in 1892

Konovalov was born in Ivanovka and went to study at the Mining institute at St. Petersburg in 1878. He became a student of Dmitri Mendeleev in 1890 and later succeeded him as professor of inorganic chemistry at St. Petersburg. He became director of the Mining institute in 1904 and became a deputy minister of trade and industry, while also presiding of the bureau of weights and measures. Konovalov identified a rule for two liquids in solution and their distillation. He considered two components in a closed system and examined the vapour pressures of the components and stated that at equilibrium, the vapor pressures, and the partial pressures of the components in the vapor, are equal. Konovalov came up with the theory based on a thought experiment and then demonstrated it through experiments. Konovalov's second rule was that the maxima or minima of saturation vapour-pressure curves corresponded to the composition of azeotropic mixtures. Konovalov also examined osmotic pressure across membranes and gave a formula for equilibrium in 1890. He also worked on two component electrolytes and the heat of combustion of organic compounds.
