= Dmitri Mavrommatis =

Greek asset manager

Dimitri Mavrommatis (Greek: Δημήτρης Μαυρομμάτης) is a Greek born asset manager and art collector based in Switzerland with additional residences in Paris, London and New York City. He was on the European advisory board of Christie's and the international advisory board of Sotheby's. In 2014 Sotheby's Geneva featured Mavrommatis' gems in their November jewelry sale in an event the auction house titled "The Passion of Collecting". In 2012 ARTnews editor Milton Esterow listed Mavrommatis in the magazine's yearly top ten list of the world's 200 premiere art collectors. In addition to possessing a sizable collection of contemporary art including significant pieces by Pablo Picasso, Joan Miró, Alexander Calder, Andy Warhol and Christopher Wool, Mavrommatis owns one of the most important collections of Sèvres porcelain on the planet. He also sold at Sotheby's one of the most important jewelry collections in the world with two new records for a sapphire and a ruby.
