= Dmitri Golubev (footballer, born 1985) =

Russian footballer

Personal information
- Full name: Dmitri Andreyevich Golubev
- Date of birth: 5 January 1985 (age 41)
- Place of birth: Yaroslavl, Russian SFSR
- Height: 1.85 m (6 ft 1 in)
- Position: Defender

Youth career
- FC Shinnik Yaroslavl

Senior career*
Years	Team	Apps	(Gls)
2003–2004	FC Shinnik Yaroslavl	0	(0)
2005–2006	FC Spartak Lukhovitsy	33	(0)
2006–2008	FC Yelets	63	(0)
2008	FC Sheksna Cherepovets	18	(1)
2009	FC Dynamo Kirov	25	(1)
2010–2013	FC Kaluga	89	(2)
2014–2015	FC Spartak Kostroma	24	(1)
- * Club domestic league appearances and goals

Dmitri Andreyevich Golubev (Russian: Дмитрий Андреевич Голубев; born 5 January 1985) is a former Russian professional footballer.

== Club career ==
He made his debut for FC Shinnik Yaroslavl on 3 July 2004 in an Intertoto Cup game against FK Teplice.
