= Cardinals created by Pius II =

Catholic appointments from 1460 to 1462

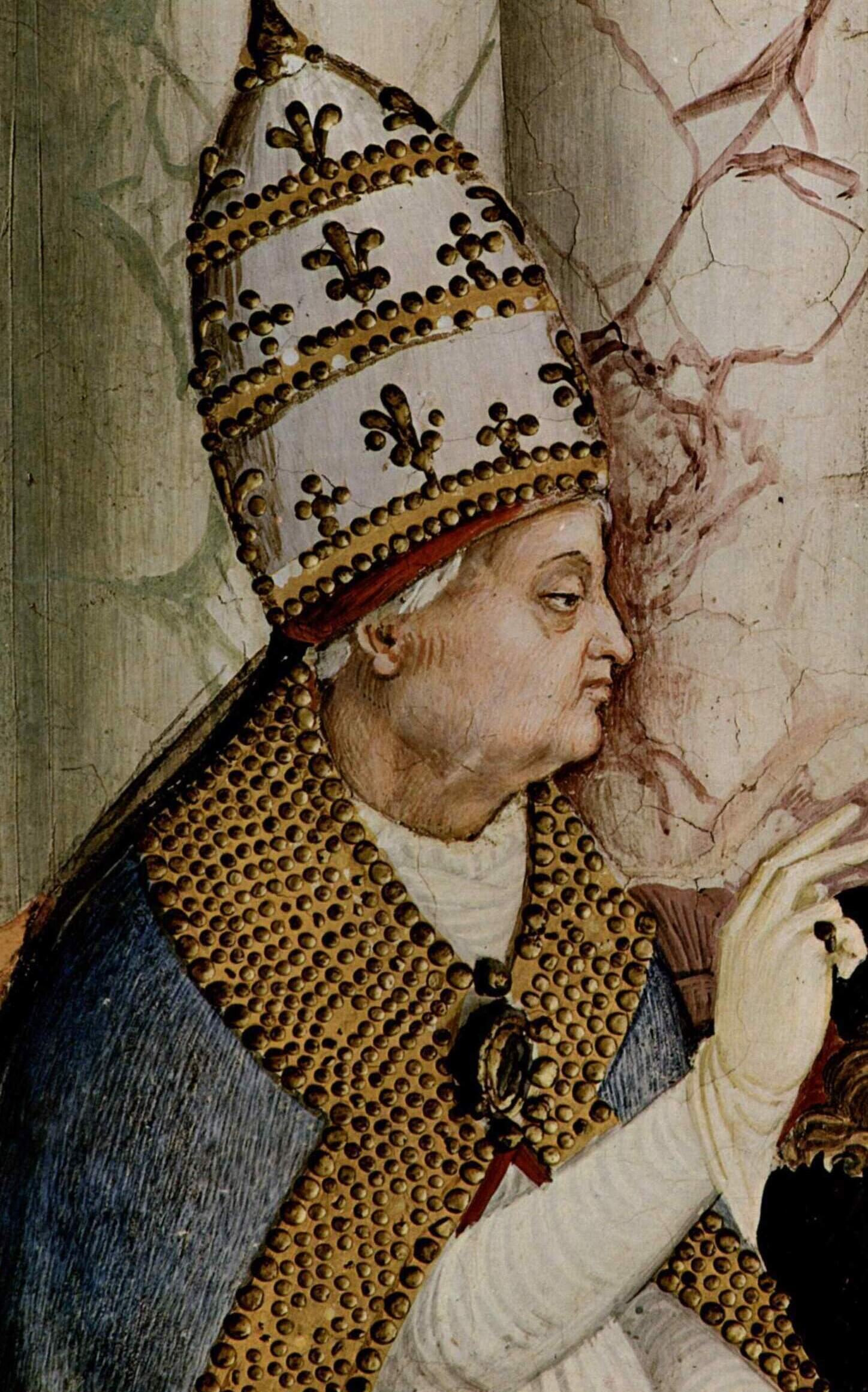
Pope Pius II (r. 1458–1464)

Pope Pius II (r. 1458–1464) created thirteen new cardinals in three consistories:

== 5 March 1460 ==
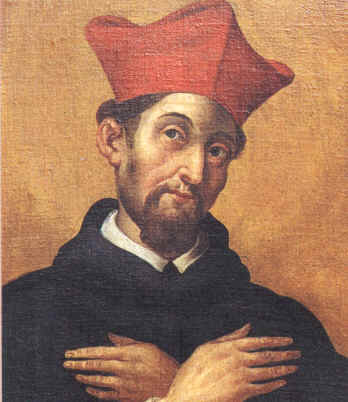
Alessandro Oliva, who was made a cardinal on March 5, 1460.

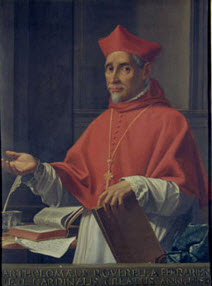
Bartolomeo Roverella, made a cardinal on December 18, 1461.

1. Angelo Capranica, bishop of Rieti – cardinal priest of S. Croce in Gerusalemme (received the title on 26 March 1460), then cardinal bishop of Palestrina (11 December 1472), died 3 July 1478
2. Berardo Eroli, bishop of Spoleto – cardinal priest of S. Sabina (received the title on 19 March 1460), then cardinal bishop of Sabina (23 May 1474), died 2 April 1479
3. Niccolò Fortiguerra, bishop of Chieti – cardinal priest of S. Cecilia (received the title on 19 March 1460), died 21 December 1473
4. Alessandro Oliva, O.E.S.A., prior general of his order – cardinal priest of S. Susanna (received the title on 19 March 1460), died 20 August 1463
5. Francesco Nanni-Todeschini-Piccolomini, nephew of the Pope, administrator of the see of Siena – cardinal deacon of S. Eustachio (received the title on 26 March 1460), on 22 September 1503 became Pope Pius III, died 18 October 1503
6. Burkhard Weisbriach, archbishop of Salzburg (created in pectore, published on 31 May 1462) – cardinal priest of SS. Nereo ed Achilleo (received the title on 31 May 1462), died 16 February 1466

== 18 December 1461 ==
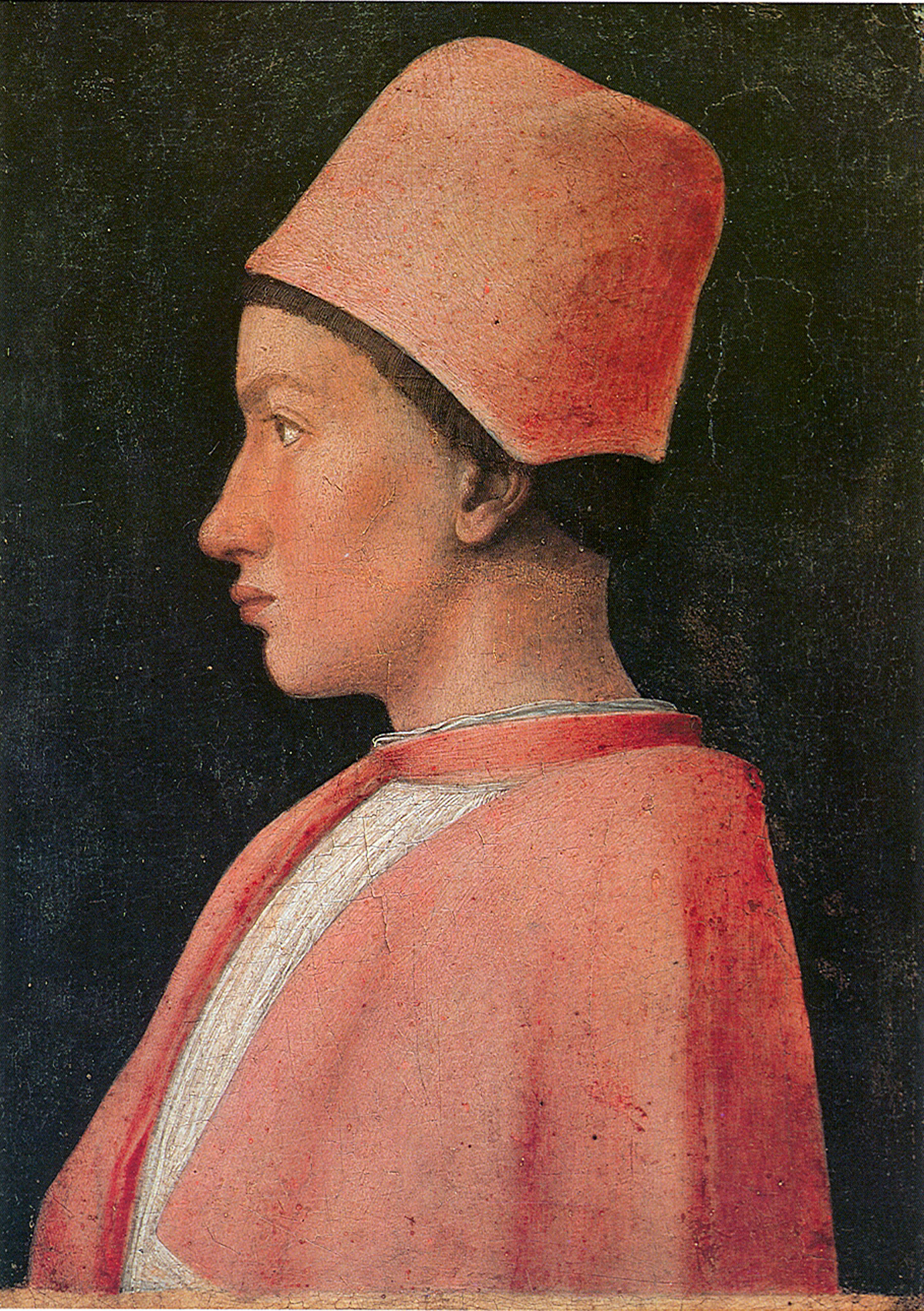
Francesco Gonzaga, made a cardinal on December 18, 1461.

1. Bartolomeo Roverella, archbishop of Ravenna – cardinal priest of S. Clemente (received the title on 26 January 1464), died 2 May 1476
2. Jean Jouffroy, bishop of Arras – cardinal priest of SS. Silvestro e Martino (received the title on 16 March 1462), died in November 1473
3. Jaime Cardona, bishop of Urgel – cardinal priest without the title, died 1 December 1466
4. Louis d'Albret, bishop of Cahors – cardinal priest of SS. Marcellino e Pietro (received the title on 31 May 1462), died 4 September 1465
5. Jacopo Piccolomini-Ammannati, bishop of Pavia – cardinal priest of S. Crisogono (received the title on 8 January 1462), then cardinal bishop of Frascati (17 August 1477), died 10 September 1479
6. Francesco Gonzaga, protonotary apostolic – cardinal deacon of S. Maria Nuova (received the title on 2 April 1462), died 21 October 1483

== 31 May 1462 ==
- Johann von Eych (d. 1464), Bishop of Eichstätt 1445-64
