= Tiburzio di Maso =

Tiburzio di Maso (executed 31 October 1460) was a leader of an anarchic faction in Rome that briefly attempted to restore the medieval commune of the city, the last attempt at populist government in the States of the Church.

In the tumultuous atmosphere of the revolt against Ferrante, the Aragonese King of Naples by the local lords who supported the claims of the House of Anjou, which broke out anew in 1460, Francesco Sforza had induced the Pope, Pius II to support Ferrante in the Neapolitan War of 1460–61. The strife in the Kingdom of Naples was reflected in Rome. In the absence of the Pope, who was taking the waters for his gout in the neighborhood of his native Siena in the aftermath of the disappointing Council of Mantua, two bands of youthful thugs competed for territory in the city of Rome. The Conservatori were inactive and the disturbances grew so great by the end of March that the Governor was forced to vacate the Lateran Palace and call on Pius for military support.

The perennial anti-Papal party in Rome, at this time headed by the Savelli, the Colonna and the Anguillara, made overtures to the condottiero Jacopo Piccinino, son of Niccolò Piccinino, who was fighting for René d'Anjou. Violence erupted in Rome over the rescue from the law of an abductor of a young woman, by a gang headed by the brothers Tiburzio and Valeriano di Maso, whose father, brother-in-law to Stefano Porcari, had been executed for his complicity in Porcaro's plot against Nicholas V in 1453 . The brothers, announcing that they were "throwing off the yoke of the priests" according to Stefano Infessura, and restoring the Roman Republic, barricaded themselves in the Pantheon, and then, driven from stronghold to stronghold, fortified themselves in Palazzo Capranica.

Jacopo Piccinino was plundering in the Sabine Hills and threatened Rome, according to an informant who identified as Piccinino's supporters the Prince of Taranto, Everso di Anguillara, Jacopo Savelli and the Colonna, and that Tiburzio's gang would open the gates of Rome to the condottiero.

Pius finally left Siena; he gathered together at Orvieto representatives of the contending houses of Aragon and Anjou preparatory to making peace, gathered five hundred horseman at Viterbo and set out for Rome where he arrived 6 October, to public expressions of joy and relief.

In mid-October, with rumors rife of an assault on the city by Piccinino, Tiburzio made an attempt to rescue a captured ally, calling fruitlessly on the city to rise up, and was captured with some of his comrades as they attempted to flee to Palombara. On the scaffold he acknowledged that he had intended, with the aid of the Ghibelline barons and Piccinino, to overthrow the papal government, made bold by the predictions of a fortune-teller.

He was hanged on the Campidoglio, 31 October 1460. In March 1461, eleven other members of Tiburzio's gang ventured to Rome from Palombara and were captured and hanged. On 10 July 1461, Jacopo Savelli, the last genuine threat, threw himself at Pius' feet and was granted mercy.
