= Commentaries (Pope Pius II) =

1584 autobiography by Pope Pius II

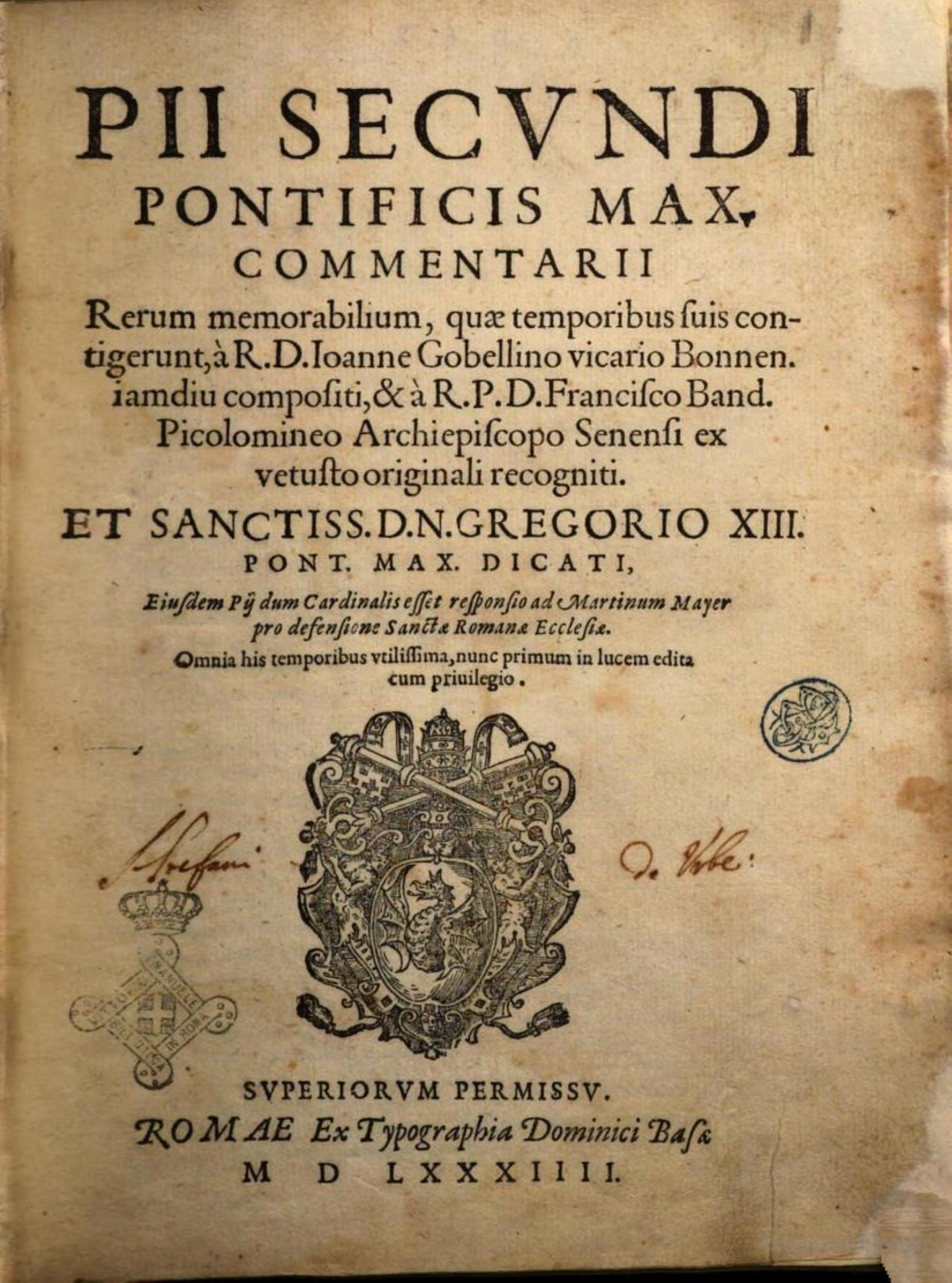
- Title page of first edition, 1584
- Author: Pope Pius II
- Genre: Autobiography
- Published: 1584
- Publisher: Francesco Bandini Piccolomini; Johannes Gobellinus

The Commentaries (Latin: Pii II Commentarii rerum memorabilium, quae temporibus suis contigerunt) is an autobiography by Pope Pius II. It is his most important literary work, and contains a full account of all the events in which he was engaged. Bartolomeo Platina in his Life of Pius II mentioned the existence of these commentaries; but they were not published till 1584, by Francesco Bandini Piccolomini, Archbishop of Siena, who possessed a manuscript which had been copied by a German priest, Johannes Gobellinus.

Archbishop Piccolomini assigned to the copyist the honour of being the publisher, therefore the Commentaries of Pius II were published under the name of Gobellinus. Giovanni Antonio Campano, however, in a letter to Cardinal Giovanni Piccolomini, said that Pius II wrote the Commentaries, and handed over to him for correction the results of his hurried dictation; he pronounced that they need no other hand to increase their dignity, and are the despair of those who would wish to imitate them. Campano, however, divided them into twelve books, and probably made a few additions and alterations. Platina mentions the beginning of a thirteenth book which Gobellinus did not include in his manuscript. The thirteenth book was published by Georg Voigt in the appendix to the second volume of his Ænea Sylvio de Piccolomini.

According to church historian Mandell Creighton, the Commentaries are the best literary work of Pius II:

The study of history was to him the source of instruction in life, the basis for the formation of his character. He looked upon events with reference to their results in the future, and his actions were regulated by a strong sense of historical proportion. Similarly, the present was to him always the product of the past, and he shaped his motives by reference to historical antecedents. It was probably this historical point of view which made him engage in so many schemes, because he felt that, when once affairs were in movement, the skilful statesman might be able to reap some permanent advantage. He was not willing to let slip any opportunity which might afford an opening for his political dexterity. Had he been less of a student, had his mind been less fertile, he might have concentrated his energies more successfully on one supreme object. Scholars have made sufficient use of the writings of Pius II to illustrate his vividness of pictorial power, his insight into character, his statesmanlike analysis of political motives. But Pius II is not content only to record matters in which he was himself engaged. His Commentaries are full of digressions about European affairs generally. He never mentions anything without fully investigating its causes; he never sees a town which he does not describe with reference to its past. Pius II is the first writer who attempted to represent the present as it would look to posterity; who consciously applied a scientific conception of history to the explanation and arrangement of passing events.

It is the first memoir written by a sitting pope in history, followed only by Pope Francis' Hope in 2025. The first translation, in any language, of the entire Commentaries was done by Florence Alden Gragg into English and published in several volumes from 1936 to 1957.
