= San Lorenzo, San Lorenzo in Campo =

Basilica church in San Lorenzo in Campo, Italy

The Abbey of San Lorenzo is a Roman Catholic basilica church, formerly part of a Benedictine monastery, located on Via San Demetrio #4 in San Lorenzo in Campo, province of Pesaro e Urbino, region of Marche, Italy. It was elevated to a basilica church in 1943 by Pope Pius XII.

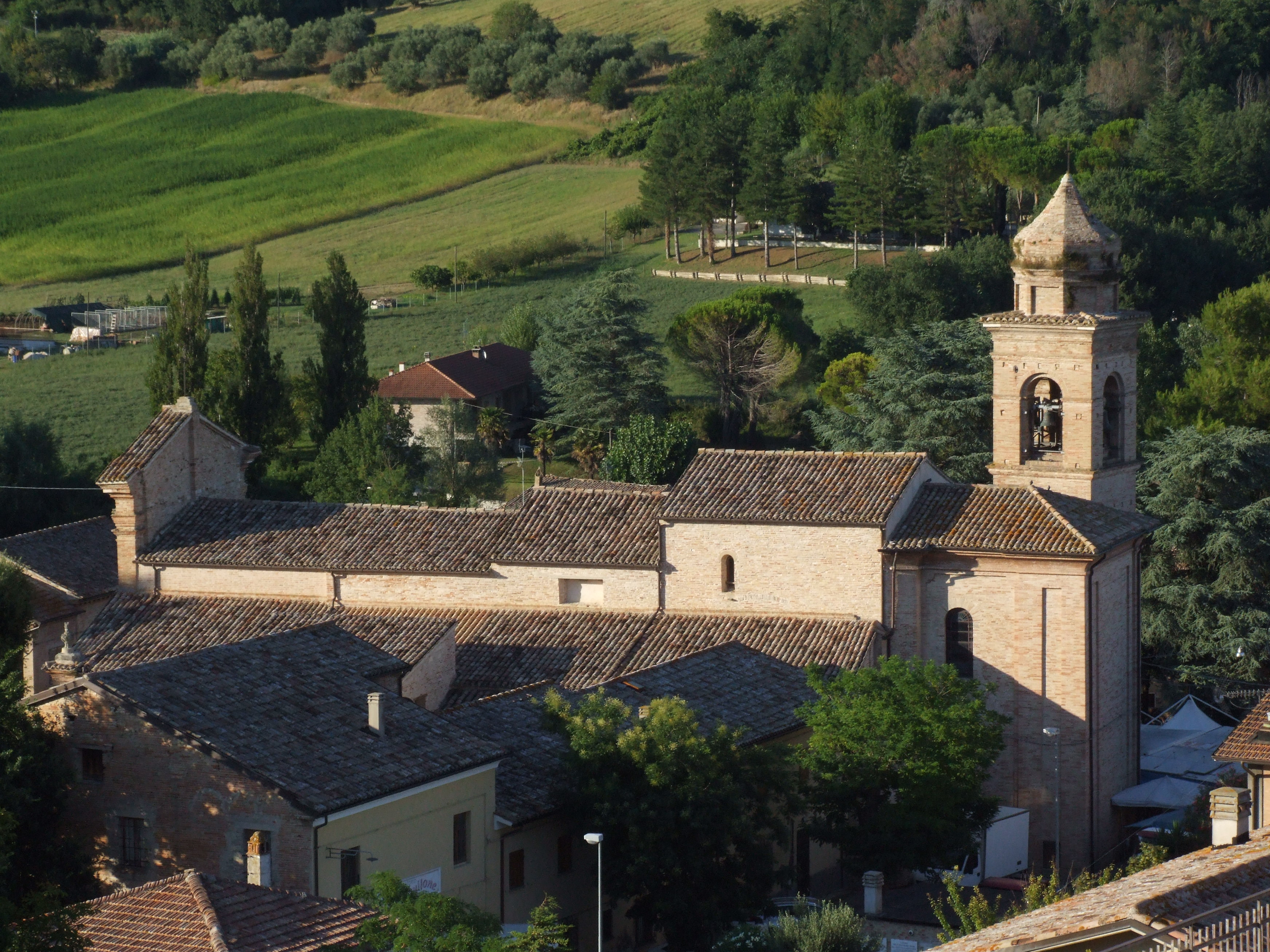
Abbazia Benedettina – San Lorenzo in Campo

== History ==
A Benedictine abbey was established here by monks from Sant’Apollinare in Classe, and erected as this site, which once had a pagan temple of Adonis.

The church was erected in late-Romanesque/early-Gothic-style with three naves. The columns in the nave derive from spolia, originating from granite of Egypt. The apse dates to the 9th century.

The main altar is made from various marbles. The crypt is found below the main altar and had two 17th-century crucifixes by Fra Innocenzo da Petralia. It also housed an urn, putatively with the relics of St Demetrius, returned to the city of Salonica in Greece.

The interior of the abbey has a Madonna and Saints with scenes of the Passion (1535) by Ercole Ramazzani. There is a canvas depicting St Demetrius and St Laurence receiving the martyrs' palms from a Jesus Child held by the Madonna (1530) by Pietro Paolo Agabito.
