= The Tale of Two Lovers =

Love novel by Aeneas Silvio Piccolomini (Pope Pius II)

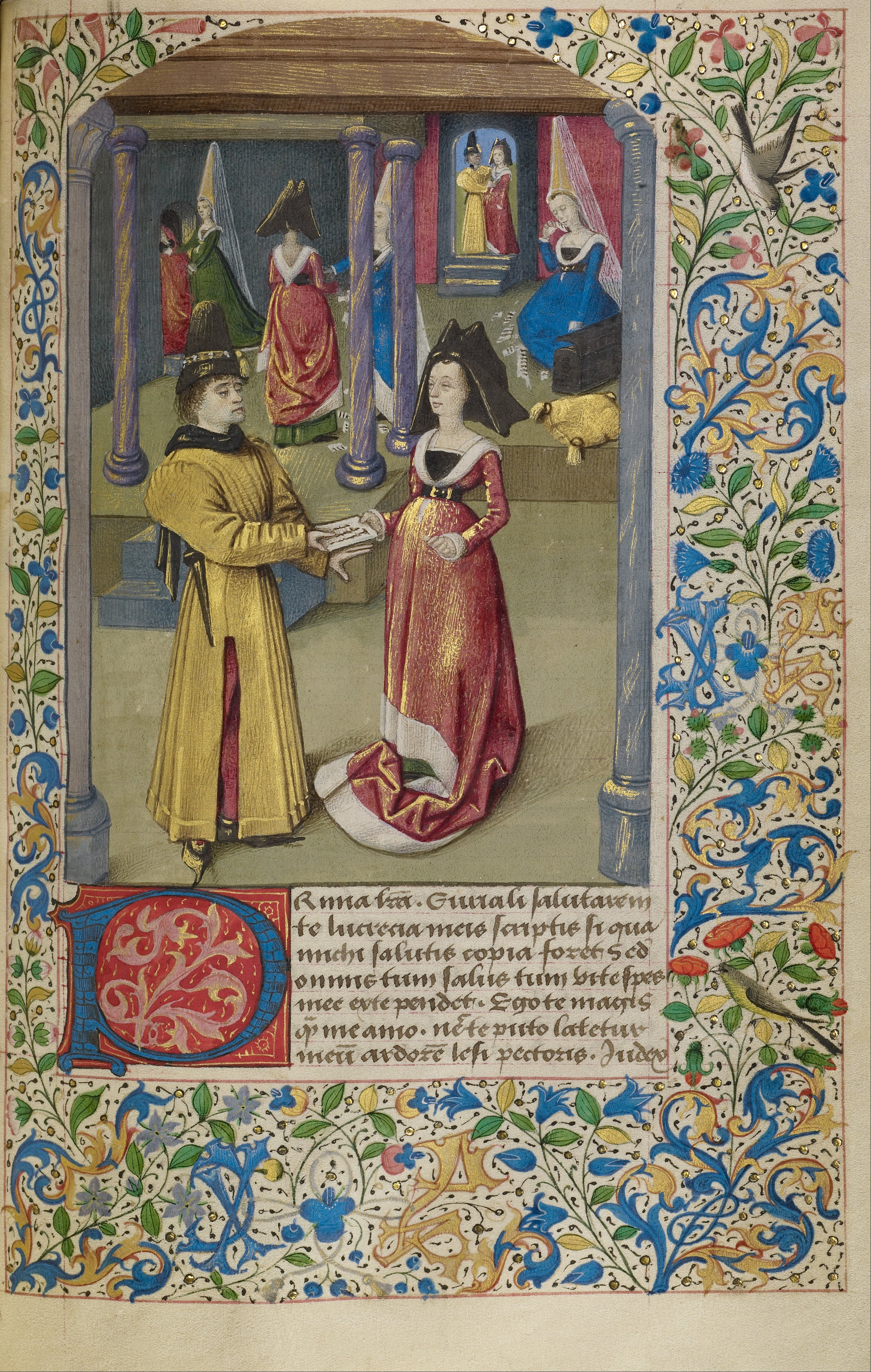
- Manuscript of Historiam, containing Euryalus primam epistolam ad Lucretiam mittit (Euryalus Sends His First Letter to Lucretia)
- Author: Aeneas Sylvius Piccolomini
- Original title: Historia de duobus amantibus
- Language: Latin
- Genres: Epistolary novel
- Set in: Siena, Italy
- Publisher: Ulrich Zell
- Publication date: Written 1444; Published 1467

The Tale of Two Lovers (Latin: Historia de duobus amantibus) (1444) is a novel by Aeneas Sylvius Piccolomini, the future Pope Pius II. It is one of the earliest examples of an epistolary novel, full of erotic imagery. The first printed edition was published by Ulrich Zell in Cologne between 1467 and 1470.

The novel is set in Siena, Italy, and centres on the love story of Lucretia, a married woman, and Euryalus, one of the men waiting on the Duke of Austria. After an uncertain beginning, in which each is in love but unaware that it is reciprocated, they begin a correspondence, which takes up much of the rest of the novel. Before writing his first love letter, Euryalus quotes Virgil in defence of his position: Amor vincit omnia et nos cedamus amori (translated: "Love conquers all; let us all yield to love!").

The lovers were identified by some with Kaspar Schlick, the chancellor of Sigismund, Holy Roman Emperor, and a daughter of the elder Mariano Sozzini, Aeneas' law teacher at the University of Siena.

In 1462, it was translated into German by Niklas van Wyle, who dedicated it to his patron, Mechthild of the Palatinate.

Translations have been made into several languages, including English.

== Sources ==
- Morrall, E. J. (1996). "Aeneas Silvius Piccolomini (Pius II), Historia de duobus amantibus". Library. s6-XVIII, 3: 216–29. doi:10.1093/library/s6-XVIII.3.216.
- Pius II. Aeneas Sylvius Eurialus und Lukrezia. (in German) translated by Octovien de Saint-Gelais ... Halle: Max Niemeyer 1914.
