= Amy Louise Barbour =

American classical scholar (1869–1950)

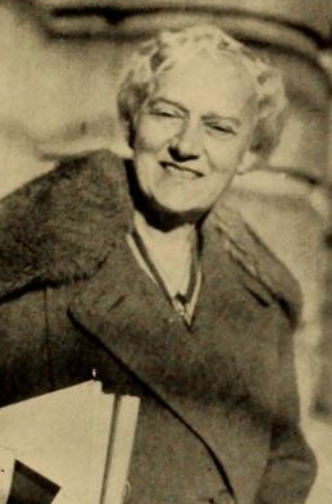
- Amy Louise Barbour, from the 1929 yearbook of Smith College
- Born: September 25, 1869; Ansonia, Connecticut, U.S.
- Died: October 17, 1950 (age 81); Clinton, Massachusetts, U.S.
- Occupations: Classical scholar, college professor
- Partner: Florence Alden Gragg
- Relatives: John F. Collin (grandfather)

Amy Louise Barbour (September 25, 1869 – October 17, 1950) was an American classical scholar and college professor. She was one of the first women to earn a Ph.D. in classical studies in the United States, when she completed her doctoral work at Yale University in 1902. She taught Greek at Smith College from 1902 to 1937.

== Early life and education ==
Barbour was born in Ansonia, Connecticut, the daughter of Sylvester Barbour and Frances Amelia Collin Barbour. Her father was a judge, and her mother was a writer. Her grandfather was politician John F. Collin, who served a term in Congress.

She attended co-educational Hartford Public High School, and graduated from Smith College in 1891, and completed doctoral work at Yale University in 1902, becoming one of the first women in the United States to earn a Ph.D. in classical studies. Her dissertation was titled "Tryphiodorus, a Late Epic Poet: His Relation to Other Epics in Form and Vocabulary" (1902).

== Career ==
Barbour taught at Marietta College in Ohio from 1891 to 1896. She joined the faculty of Smith College in 1902, achieved full professor status in 1919, and taught Greek there until she retired in 1937. She was class dean for the classes of 1923 and 1929, and was involved in the campus productions of several Greek plays. She served on the executive committee of the Classical Association of New England (CANE), and was a member of the American Philological Association, the American Association of University Professors, and the Archaeological Institute of America.

== Publications ==
- Selections from Herodotus (1929, editor)

== Personal life ==
Barbour lived with her partner and colleague Florence Alden Gragg. They traveled together in Italy and Greece. They drove across the United States together in 1933, after visiting Gragg's sister in California. Barbour died in 1950, in Clinton, Massachusetts, at the age of 81. Her papers are held in Smith College Special Collections.
