= Demetrius of Thessaloniki =

Christian martyr (died 306)

Saint Demetrius of Thessalonica
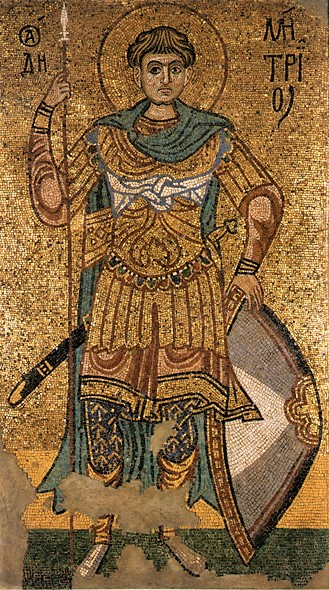
- 12th century mosaic depicting Saint Demetrius, from the Golden-Roofed Monastery in Kyiv

Great-Martyr, Myroblyte
- Born: 270; Thessalonica, Macedonia, Roman Empire
- Died: 306 or 305; Thessalonica, Macedonia, Roman Empire
- Venerated in: Eastern Orthodoxy; Oriental Orthodoxy; Roman Catholicism; Lutheran Church; Anglicanism
- Major shrine: Hagios Demetrios, Thessaloniki
- Feast: Eastern Orthodox Church: 26 October and on All-Saints of Salonica (aka Thessalonica and Thessaloniki), on 3rd Sunday of Pascha (Sunday of the Myrrh-bearing Women); Roman Catholic Church: 9 April and 8 October
- Attributes: depicted wearing the armour of a Roman soldier, usually carrying a spear, often seated on a red horse
- Patronage: Thessaloniki, Siberia, Sremska Mitrovica, Kosovska Mitrovica, Calgary; soldiers; Crusades (in Roman Catholic tradition); agriculture, peasants and shepherds (in the Greek countryside during Middle Ages); construction industry in Bulgaria, winter, snow, cold

Saint Demetrius (or Demetrios) of Thessalonica (Greek: Ἅγιος Δημήτριος τῆς Θεσσαλονίκης, Hágios Dēmḗtrios tēs Thessaloníkēs (Note: Russian: Димитрий Солунский (Dimitry Solunsky); Bulgarian: Димитър Солунски (Dimitar Solunski); Macedonian: Свети Димитрија Солунски (Sveti Dimitrija Solunski); Romanian: Sfântul Dumitru, Sfântul Dimitrie; Serbian: Димитрије Солунски; Albanian: Shmitri (Kosovo) and Shën Dhimitri (Albania); Ukrainian: Димитрій Солунській)), also known as the Holy Great-Martyr Demetrius the Myroblyte (meaning 'the Myrrh-Gusher' or 'Myrrh-Streamer'; (Note: Greek: Ἅγιος Μεγαλομάρτυς Δημήτριος ὁ Μυροβλύτης (Hágios Megalomártys Dēmḗtrios ho Myroblýtēs)) 3rd century – 306), was a Greek Christian martyr of the early 4th century AD.

During the Middle Ages, he came to be revered as one of the most important Orthodox military saints, often paired with Saint George of Lydda.

== Life ==
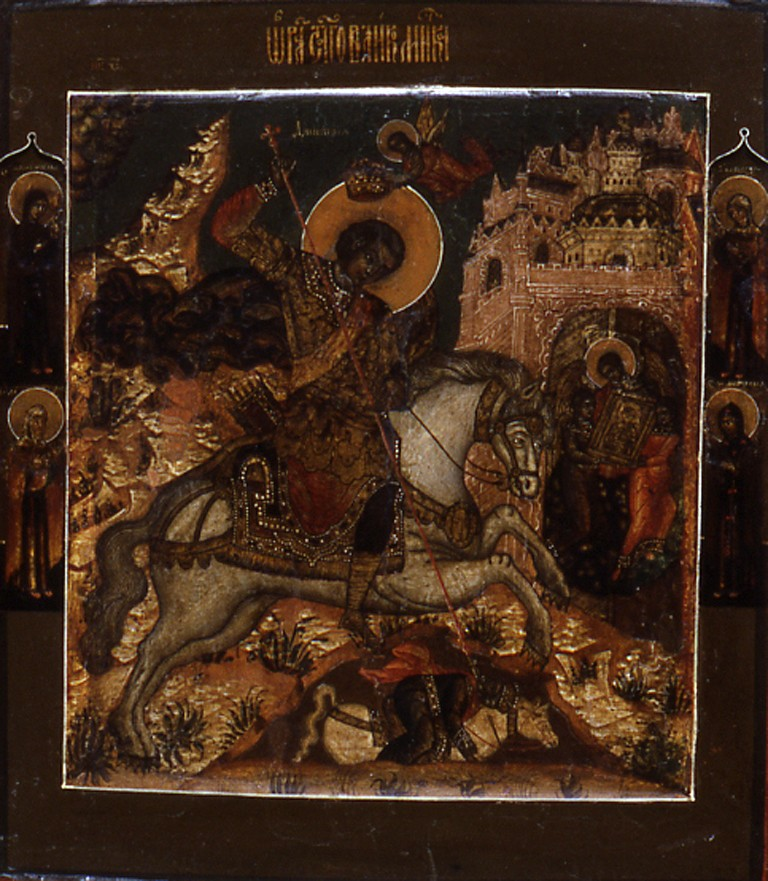
St Demetrius of Salonica, 18th century, Walters Art Museum

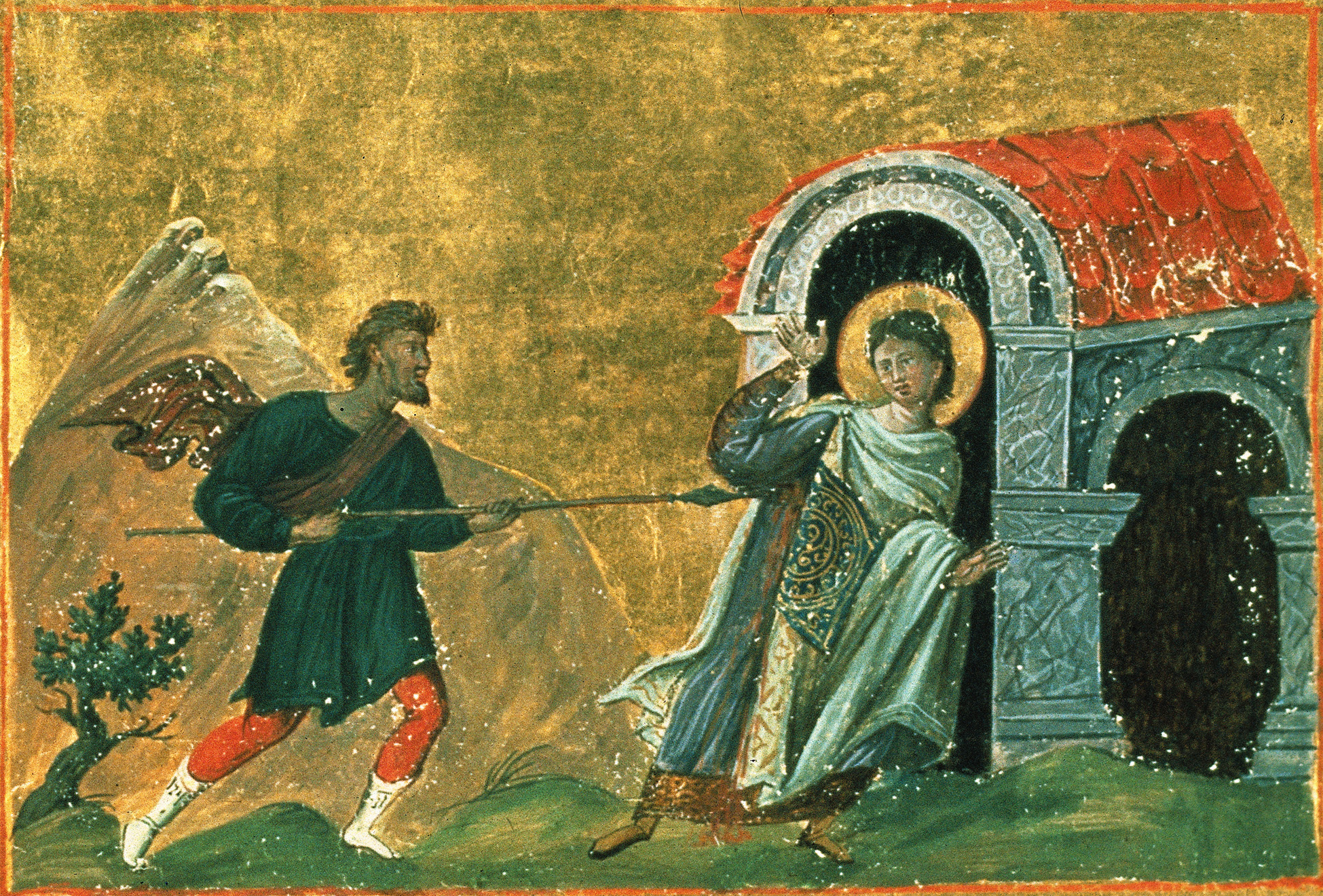
Martyrdom of Demetrius of Thessalonica, depicted in the 11th century Menologion of Basil II.

The earliest written accounts of his life were compiled in the 9th century, although there are earlier images of him, and the 7th century Miracles of Saint Demetrius collection. According to these early accounts, Demetrius was born to pious Christian parents in Thessalonica, Macedonia in 270.

According to the hagiographies, Demetrius was a young man of senatorial family who became proconsul of the Thessalonica district. He was run through with spears in around 306 in Thessalonica, during the Christian persecutions under the emperor Galerius, which matches his depiction in the 7th century mosaics.

== Veneration of sainthood and celebrations ==
=== Evolution during the Byzantine Empire ===
==== Transfer to Thessalonica; gaining of military attributes ====
Most historical scholars follow the hypothesis put forward by Bollandist Hippolyte Delehaye (1859-1941), that his veneration was transferred from Sirmium when Thessalonica replaced it as the main military base in the area in 441-442 AD. His very large church in Thessalonica, the Hagios Demetrios, dates from the mid-5th century. Thessaloniki remained a centre of his veneration, and he is the patron saint of the city.

After the growth of his veneration as saint, the city of Thessalonica suffered repeated attacks and sieges from the Slavic peoples who moved into the Balkans, and Demetrius was credited with many miraculous interventions to defend the city. Hence later traditions about Demetrius regard him as a soldier in the Roman army, and he came to be regarded as an important military martyr.

==== From pagan Demeter to St Demetrios ====
Demetrius was also venerated as patron of agriculture, peasants and shepherds in the Greek countryside during the Middle Ages. According to historian Hans Kloft, he had inherited this role from the pagan goddess Demeter. After the demise of the Eleusinian Mysteries, Demeter's cult, in the 4th century, the Greek rural population had gradually transferred her rites and roles onto the Christian saint Demetrius.

=== During the Crusades ===
Unsurprisingly, he was extremely popular in the Middle Ages. Disputes between Bohemond I of Antioch and Alexios I Komnenos appear to have resulted in Demetrius being appropriated as patron saint of crusading.

=== Relics ===
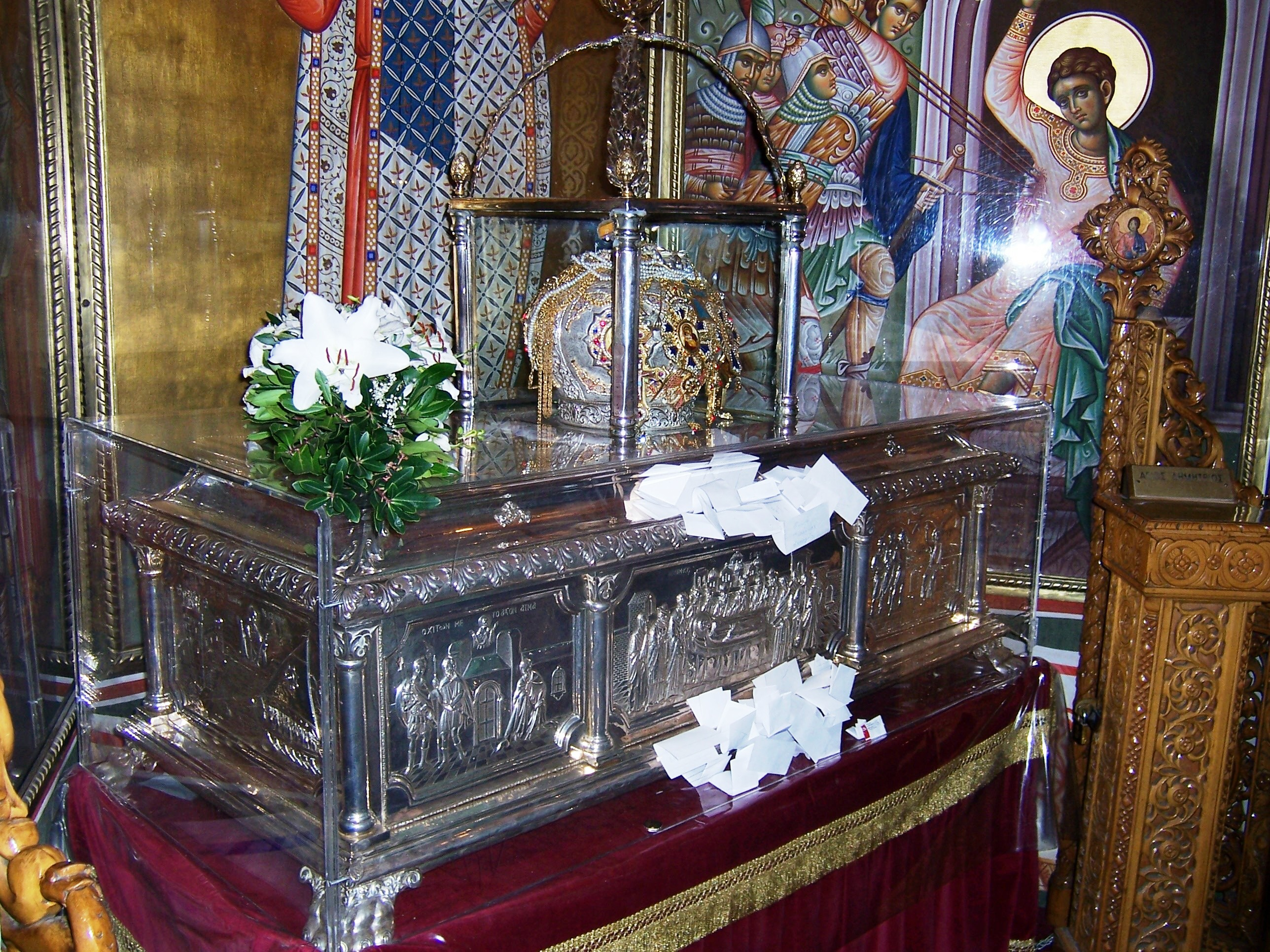
Relics of Saint Demetrius at the Hagios Demetrios Basilica in Thessaloniki

Most scholars still believe that for four centuries after his death, Demetrius had no physical relics, and in their place an unusual empty shrine called the "ciborium" was built inside Hagios Demetrios. What were purported to be his remains subsequently appeared in Thessalonica, but the local archbishop John, who compiled the first book of the Miracles ca. 610, was publicly dismissive of their authenticity. The relics were assumed to be genuine after they started emitting a liquid and strong-scented myrrh. This gave Demeterius the epithet Myroblyte. (Note: This epithet is shared with other Orthodox saints: e.g. Saint Nilus of Kynouria, Saint Barbarus.)

In the 13th century, the relics were taken to Western Europe and kept in the Abbey of San Lorenzo in Campo in Italy. On 23 October 1978, the skull of the saint was returned to Thessalonki followed by the majority of his relics two years later. A silver reliquary containing the relics lies within a marble ciborium in the northern nave of the church. Myrrh continues to stream from the relics.

=== Veneration in Orthodox world outside Greece ===
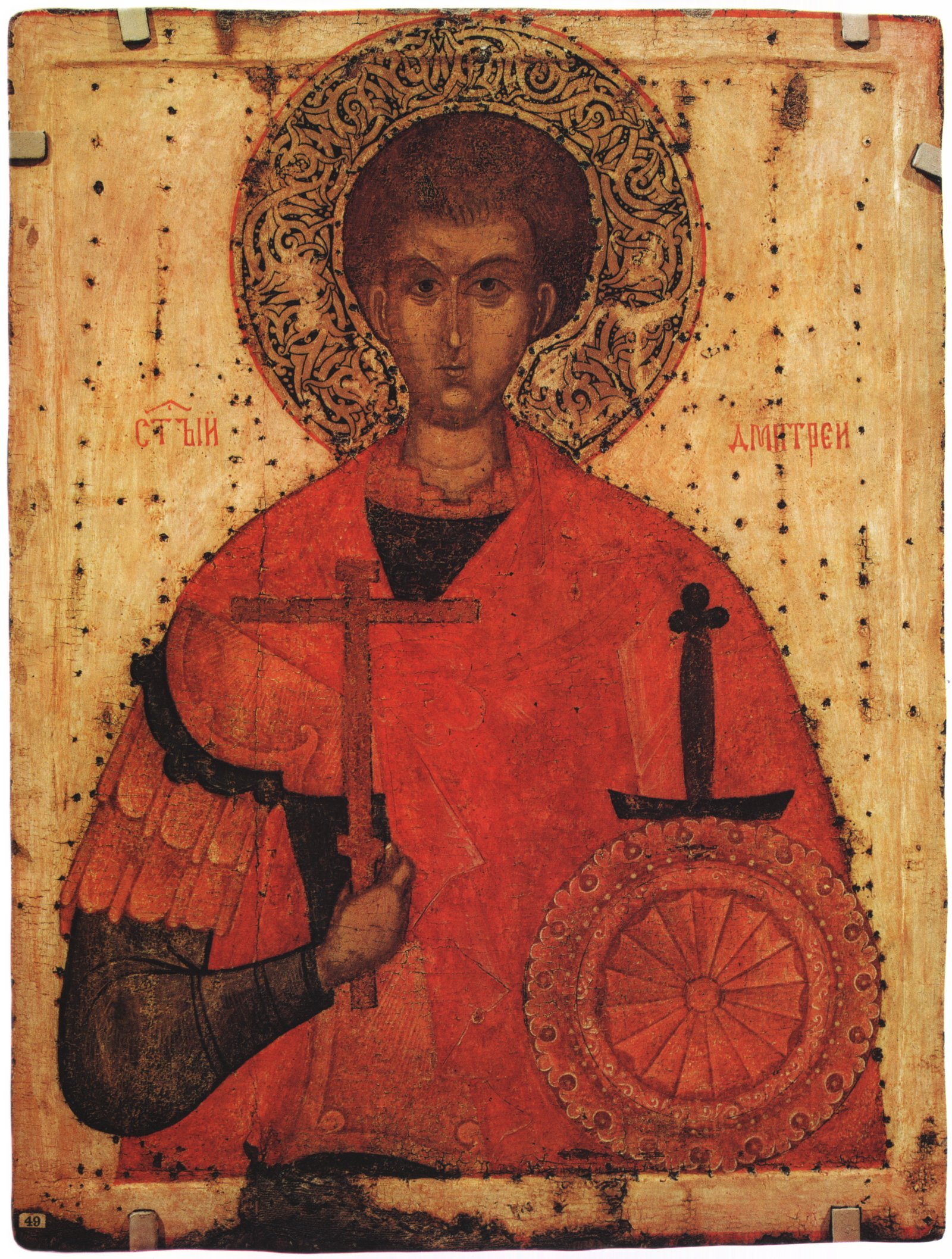
15th century icon of St Demetrius (Russian State Museum, Saint Petersburg)

Demetrius was a patron saint of the Rurik dynasty from the late 11th century on. Iziaslav I of Kiev (whose Christian name was Dimitry) founded the first East Slavic monastery dedicated to this saint.

In the Russian Orthodox Church (ROC), the Saturday before the Feast of Saint Demetrius is a memorial day. Originally, the day was one commemorating the soldiers who fell in the Battle of Kulikovo (1380), under the leadership of Demetrius of the Don, but came to be a day in which all reposed Orthodox Christians were commemorated. This day is known as Demetrius Saturday.

The Bulgarian Orthodox Church and the Romanian Orthodox Church revere Demetrius on 26 October (Димитровден [Dimitrovden] in Bulgarian); meanwhile, the Serbian Orthodox Church and Macedonian Orthodox Church (Ohrid) on 8 November (called Митровдан [Mitrovdan] in Serbian and Митровден [Mitrovden] in Macedonian) along with the Coptic Church, who commemorate him in their Synaxarium.

=== Derived personal names ===
The names Dimitar (Bulgarian and Macedonian), Dimitrije (Serbian), Dimitry (Russian), Dimitris (Δημήτρης, Greek), Dumitru/ Dimitrie (Romanian), Mitri (short form of Dimitri in Lebanon) are in common use.

== Iconography ==
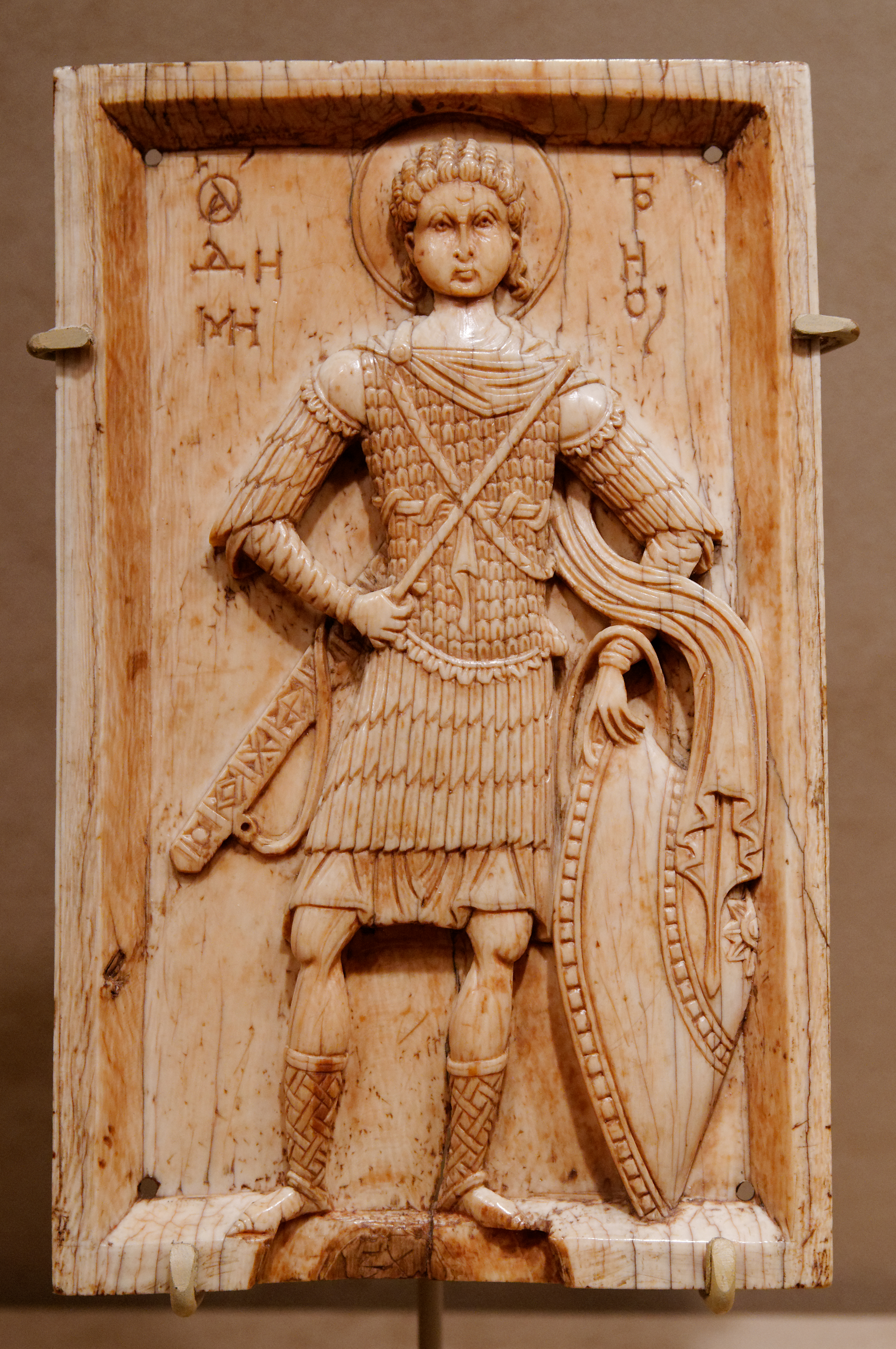
Byzantine icon of the 10th century: Demetrios as infantryman (Metropolitan Museum of Art)

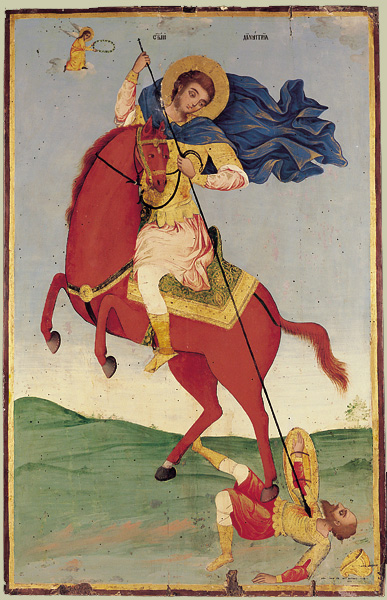
Modern Bulgarian icon of Demetrius spearing Tsar Kaloyan, who is dressed in rather Turkish style (1824).

The hagiographic cycles of the Great Martyr Demetrius of Thessalonica include depictions of scenes from his life and his posthumous miracles. Demetrius was initially depicted in icons and mosaics as a young man in patterned robes with the distinctive tablion of the senatorial class across his chest. Miraculous military interventions were attributed to him during several attacks on Thessalonica, and he gradually became thought of as a soldier: a Constantinopolitan ivory of the late 10th century shows him as an infantry soldier (Metropolitan Museum of Art). But, an icon of the late 11th century in Saint Catherine's Monastery on Mount Sinai shows him as before, still a civilian. In Byzantine icons he is depicted in military dress, either standing or riding a horse, often wielding a spear, directed towards a Bulgarian soldier or simply holding it in traditional iconography to symbolize his time as a Christian soldier and martyr.

Another Sinai icon, of the Crusader period and painted by a French artist working in the Holy Land in the second half of the 12th century, shows what then became the most common depiction. Demetrius, bearded, rather older, and on a red horse, rides together with George, unbearded and on a white horse. Both are dressed as cavalrymen. Also, while George is often shown spearing a dragon, Demetrius is depicted spearing the gladiator Lyaeus (Λυαίος Lyaíos; for meaning see here), who according to story was responsible for killing many Christians. Lyaeus is commonly depicted below Demetrius and lying supine, having already been defeated; Lyaeus is traditionally drawn much smaller than Demetrius. In traditional hagiography, Demetrius did not directly kill Lyaeus, but rather through his prayers the gladiator was defeated by Demetrius' disciple, Nestor.

A modern Greek iconographic convention depicts Demetrius with the Great White Tower in the background. The anachronistic White Tower acts as a symbolic depiction of the city of Thessalonica, despite having been built in the 16th century, centuries after his life, and the exact architecture of the older tower that stood at the same site in earlier times is unknown. Again, iconography often depicts saints holding a church or protecting a city.

According to a hagiographic legend, best known in Russia in the version retold by Demetrius of Rostov (1651–1709), Demetrius appeared in the camp of Bulgarian tsar Kaloyan during his 1207 siege of Thessalonica, piercing the king with a lance and so killing him. This scene, known in Russian as "the miracle of the destruction of Tsar Kaloyan" (Чудо о погибели царя Калояна), became a popular element in the iconography of Demetrius. He is shown on horseback piercing the king with his spear, paralleling the iconography (and often shown alongside) of Saint George and the Dragon.

== Feast Days ==
=== Eastern Orthodoxy ===
Demetrius' feast day is on 26 October, which falls on 8 November [NS, "new style"] for those following the old calendar.

There is also a commemoration of the finding of his icon on the island of Syros on 25 May.

In the Roman Catholic Church he is most commonly called Demetrius of Sirmium and his memorial is 9 April in the 2004 Roman Martyrology and 8 October in the martyrology of the Extraordinary Form. It is debated whether Demetrius of Thessalonica and Demetrius of Sirmium are the same person.

== See also ==
- Demeter
- Hagios Demetrios, the main sanctuary dedicated to Saint Demetrios
- Saint Demetrius of Thessaloniki, patron saint archive

== Sources ==
- Roth, Paul W. (1993). Soldatenheilige (in German). Graz, Vienna, Cologne: Verlag Styria. ISBN 3-222-12185-0.
- Kloft, Hans (2010). Mysterienkulte der Antike. Götter, Menschen, Rituale (in German). Munich: C.H. Beck. ISBN 978-3-406-44606-1.
- Bauer, Franz Alto (2013). Eine Stadt und ihr Patron. Thessaloniki und der Heilige Demetrios [A city and its patron saint. Thessaloniki and St Demetrios]. Regensburg: Schnell & Steiner ISBN 978-3-7954-2760-3 (monographical study on the veneration of Demetrius with a focus on Thessaloniki).
- Robin Cormack, Writing in Gold, Byzantine Society and its Icons, George Philip, London, 1985 ISBN 0-540-01085-5.
- Eugenia Russell, St Demetrius of Thessalonica; Cult and Devotion in the Middle Ages, Peter Lang, Oxford, 2010 ISBN 978-3-0343-0181-7.
- James C. Skedros, Saint Demetrios of Thessaloniki: Civic Patron and Divine Protector 4th-7th Centuries CE, Trinity Press International, 1999. Summarised in Harvard Theological Review 89:410 (1996). in JSTOR.
- James C. Skedros, "Response to David Woods" Harvard Theological Review 93:3:235 (July 2000). at JSTOR.
- Kurt Weitzmann in The Icon, 1982, Evans Brothers Ltd, London, ills. p. 32, 51, 220 (trans of Le Icone, Montadori 1981) ISBN 0-237-45645-1.
- Woods, David (2000). "Thessalonica's Patron: Saint Demetrius or Emeterius?". Harvard Theological Review. 93 (3): 221–234. doi:10.1017/S001781600002530X. JSTOR 1510028. S2CID 162463136. free copy.
- David Woods, bibliography on St. Demetrius.
