= Johann von Eych =

His Eminence Johann von Eych
- Prince-Bishop of Eichstätt
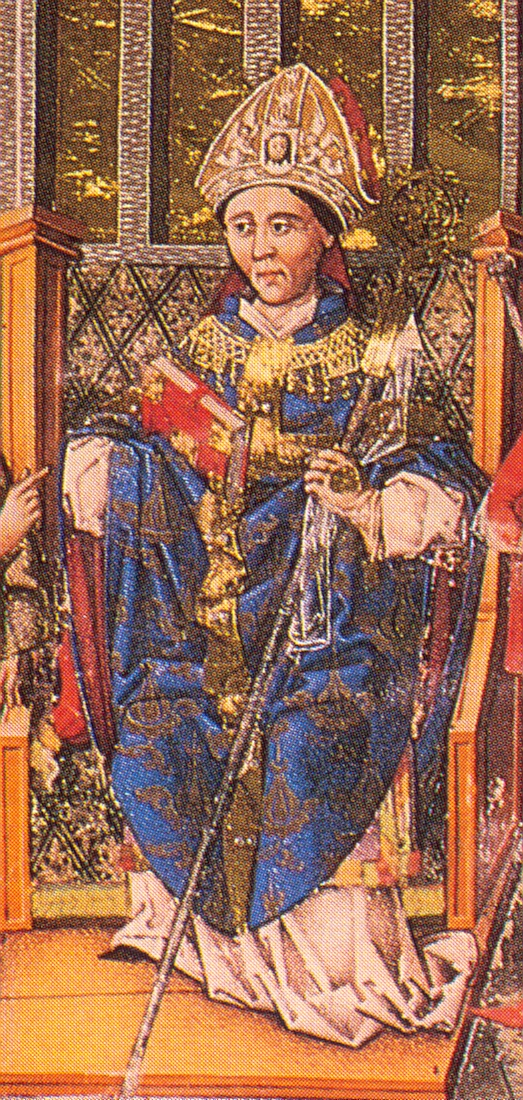
- Church: Catholic Church
- Appointed: 1 October 1445
- Term ended: 1 January 1464

Orders
- Consecration: 13 March 1446 by Peter von Schaumberg
- Created cardinal: 31 May 1462 by Pope Pius II
- Rank: Cardinal-Priest

Personal details
- Born: 1404 Bad Colberg-Heldburg, Germany
- Died: 1 January 1464 (aged 59–60) Eichstätt, Germany

Johann von Eych (died 1464) was a German Roman Catholic bishop and cardinal.

== Biography ==
Johann von Eych was born in Heldburg ca. 1404, the son of Karl von Eych and Margaretha von Heitburg. He enrolled at the University of Vienna in 1423, later attending the University of Padua and graduating in 1429 with a doctorate in Holy Scriptures and canon law.

He became a canon of Eichstätt Cathedral in 1430. He was a rector in Padua from 1433 to 1434. He became Vicar General of the Prince-Bishopric of Eichstätt in 1435. He was dean of the faculty of law at the University of Vienna in 1435; again in 1437–38. He spent 1438–41 in the service of Albert II of Germany and Albert VI, Archduke of Austria. During this period, he served as a delegate to the Council of Florence. While at the council, he began friendships with several prominent ecclesiastics with whom he would later maintain correspondence, including John of Capistrano, Nicholas of Cusa, Jakob von Tueckelhausen, and Bernhard von Waging, as well as with Ulrich Gossembrot, one of the foremost proponents of Renaissance humanism in Northern Europe. Eych returned to the University of Vienna as provost of its law faculty from 1441. After the Battle of St. Jakob an der Sihl (1443), he served as envoy from Frederick III, Holy Roman Emperor to the Dauphin of France (afterwards Louis XI of France).

On 1 October 1445 the cathedral chapter of Eichstätt Cathedral elected him to be the Prince-Bishop of Eichstätt; his appointment was confirmed by Dietrich Schenk von Erbach, Archbishop-Elector of Mainz later that month. Eych was consecrated as a bishop by Peter von Schaumberg, Prince-Bishop of Augsburg, on 13 March 1446.

A reforming bishop, Eych implemented several of the decrees of the Council of Florence. On his initiative, the cathedral school of Ingolstadt was modified to found the University of Ingolstadt. He celebrated a synod in 1447.

In the consistory held in Viterbo on 31 May 1462, Pope Pius II made him a cardinal priest. He never received the red hat or a titulus.

He died in Eichstätt on 1 January 1464. He is buried in the Monastery of Saint Walpurga in Eichstätt.

Catholic Church titles
| Preceded by Albrecht von Rechberg | Prince-Bishop of Eichstätt; 1445–1464 | Succeeded by Wilhelm von Reichenau |
