= Florence Alden Gragg =

American classics scholar

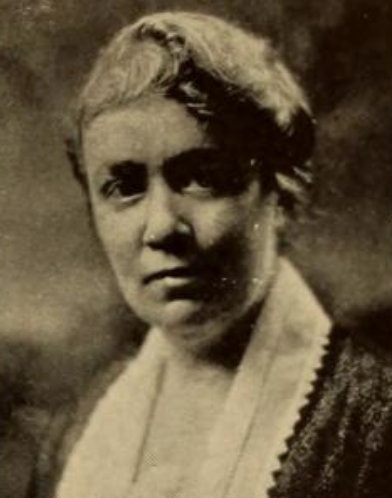
- Florence Alden Gragg, from the 1929 yearbook of Smith College
- Born: November 2, 1877; Roxbury, Massachusetts, U.S.
- Died: January 13, 1965 (age 87); Brookline, Massachusetts, U.S.
- Occupation(s): College professor, classics scholar, philologist
- Partner: Amy Louise Barbour

Florence Alden Gragg (November 2, 1877 – January 13, 1965) was an American classics scholar and college professor. She taught Latin and Greek at Smith College from 1909 to 1943.

== Early life and education ==
Gragg was born in Roxbury, Massachusetts, the daughter of Isaac Paul Gragg and Eldora Olive Waite Gragg. Her mother was a student of Mary Baker Eddy and closely involved with the founding of The First Church of Christ, Scientist in Boston. Her sister Elisabeth F. Norwood was also prominent in Christian Science.

Gragg attended Boston Girls' Latin School, and graduated from Radcliffe College. She pursued further studies at Bryn Mawr College and the American School of Classical Studies at Athens. She earned a master's degree from Radcliffe in 1906, and a Ph.D. in 1908, both in classical studies. She was a member of Phi Beta Kappa.

== Career ==
Gragg taught school in New Hampshire and New York after college. In 1909 she began teaching Latin and Greek at Smith College. She participated in campus productions of Greek dramas, including Euripides' The Iphigenia at Aulis in 1912. She became a full professor in 1917, and retired in 1943. She was named to the Radcliffe College Board of Trustees in 1939.

== Publications ==
- A Study of the Greek Epigram before 300 B.C. (1910)
- "Two Schoolmasters of the Renaissance" (1919)
- "The Inauguration of President Neilson at Smith College" (1919)
- Latin Writings of the Italian Humanists (1927, translator)
- Paolo Giovio, An Italian Portrait Gallery (1935, translator)
- The Commentaries of Pius II (1937–1957, translator)

== Personal life ==
Gragg lived with her partner and colleague Amy Louise Barbour; she also had a house in Cohasset and a farm in Hudson, Massachusetts. Gragg and Barbour traveled in Italy and Greece together, and in 1933 drove across the United States together after visiting Gragg's sister in Los Angeles. Barbour died in 1950, and Gragg died in 1965, at the age of 87, in Brookline, Massachusetts.
