= Sassoferrato =

- Comune
- Comune di Sassoferrato
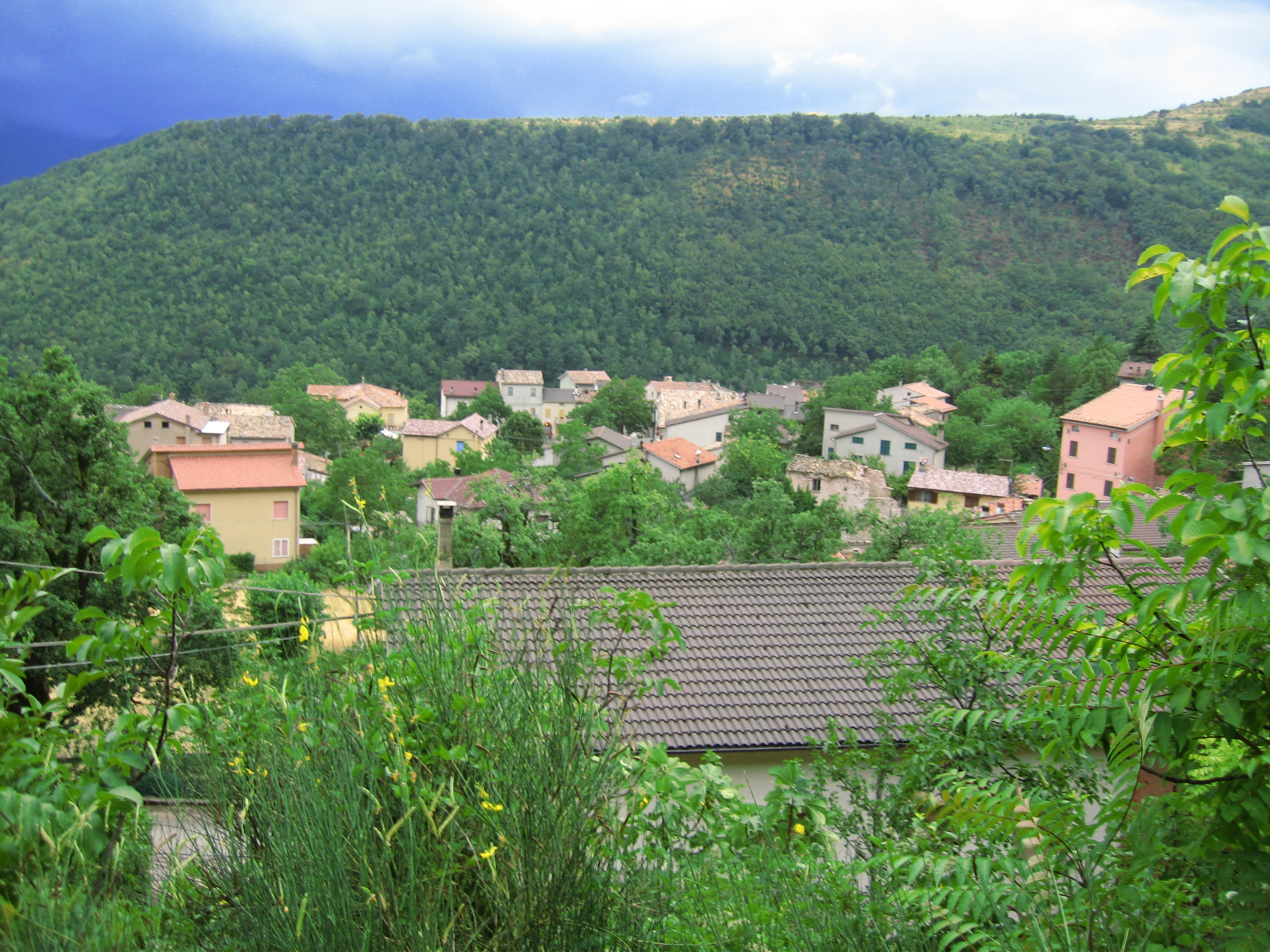
- View of Montelago, a frazione of Sassoferrato

- Coat of arms

- Sassoferrato within the Province of Ancona

- Location within Italy Location within Marche
- Coordinates: 43°26′1″N 12°51′30″E
- Country: Italy
- Region: Marche
- Province: Ancona (AN)
- Frazioni: see list

Government
  - Mayor: Maurizio Greci

Area
  - Total: 137.23 km^{2} (52.98 sq mi)
- Elevation: 386 m (1,266 ft)

Population (31 December 2016)
  - Total: 7,177
  - Density: 52.30/km^{2} (135.5/sq mi)
- Demonym: Sassoferratesi
- Time zone: UTC+1 (CET)
  - Summer (DST): UTC+2 (CEST)
- Postal code: 60041
- Dialing code: 0732
- Patron saint: Blessed Ugo degli Atti
- Saint day: July 26
- Website: Official website

Sassoferrato is a town and comune of the province of Ancona in the Marche region of central-eastern Italy. It is one of I Borghi più belli d'Italia ("The most beautiful villages of Italy").

== History ==
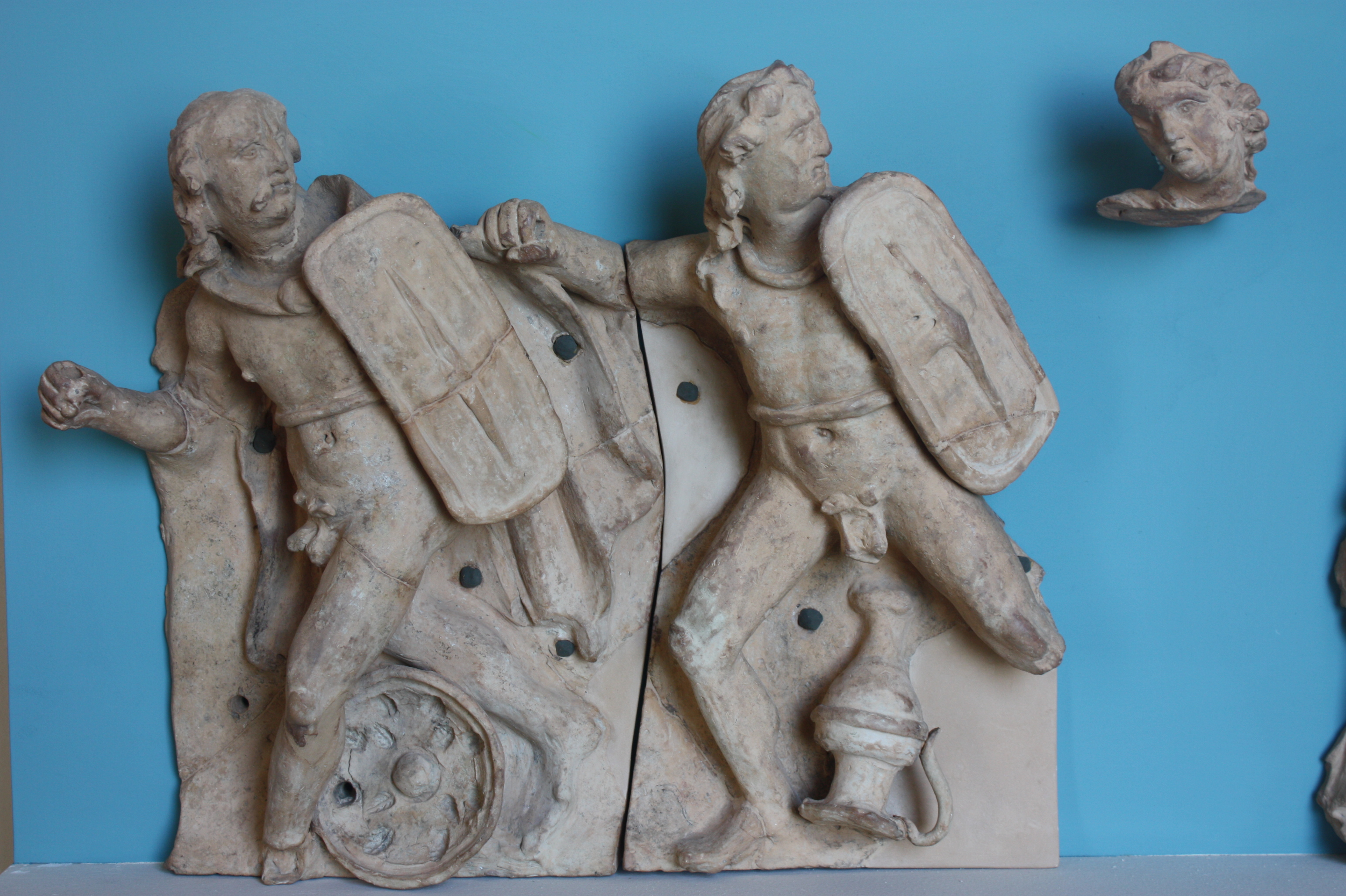
Terracotta pediment of Civitalba temple

Terracotta pediment of Civitalba temple (Ancona museum)

Between Sassoferrato and Arcevia at Fornace is a hill on which ancient Civitalba was located. The magnificent terracotta pediment of a temple dating to the end of the 2nd century BC, at the end of the Gallic War, was discovered there in the 1890s. It is therefore thought that the temple was erected in memory of the nearby Battle of Sentinum of 295 BC for Rome's celebration of victories over the Gauls.

To the south of Sassoferrato lie the remains of the ancient city of Sentinum, on the Via Flaminia.

The castle above the town is mentioned from the 11th century; the town belonged to the House of Este from 1208, later to the Atti family, becoming a free municipality in 1460 after the assassination of Luigi degli Atti.

== Geography ==
Sassoferrato borders with the municipalities of Arcevia, Fabriano, Genga, Serra Sant'Abbondio (PU), Pergola (PU), Costacciaro (PG, Umbria) and Scheggia e Pascelupo (PG, Umbria).

=== Frazioni ===
A frazione (plural: frazioni) is a type of subdivision of a comune (municipality) in Italy:

- Baruccio
- Borgo Sassoferrato
- Breccia di Venatura
- Cabernardi
- Ca' Boccolino
- Cacciamponi
- Camarano
- Camazzocchi
- Canderico
- Cantarino
- Caparucci
- Capoggi
- Casalvento
- Case Aia
- Castagna
- Castagna Bassa
- Castiglioni
- Catobagli
- Col Canino
- Coldapi
- Col della Noce
- Doglio
- Felcioni
- Frassineta
- Gaville
- Giontarello
- La Frasca
- Liceto
- Mandole
- Montelago
- Monterosso
- Monterosso Stazione
- Morello
- Pantana
- Perticano
- Piagge
- Piaggiasecca
- Piano di Frassineta
- Piano di Murazzano
- Radicosa
- Regedano
- Rondinella
- Rotondo
- San Egidio
- San Felice
- San Giovanni
- San Paolo
- San Ugo
- Sassoferrato Castello
- Schioppetto
- Scorzano
- Sementana
- Seriole
- Serra San Facondino
- Stavellina
- Valdolmo
- Valitosa
- Venatura

== Notable people ==
- Bartolo da Sassoferrato (1313–1359)
- Cardinal Alessandro Oliva (1407–1463)
- Niccolò Perotti (1430–1480), humanist
- Antonio Perotti (1535–1582), captain named the "Paladin of Italy" by Alessandro Farnese
- Pietro Paolo Agabiti (1470–1540), painter and architect
- Pandolfo Collenuccio (1444–1504), man of letters
- Giovani Battista Salvi (1609–1685), Italian Baroque painter, called "the Sassoferrato"
- Baldassarre Olimpo degli Alessandri (1480? – 1540?), poet
