= Stefano Porcari =

Italian politician and writer (1391–1453)

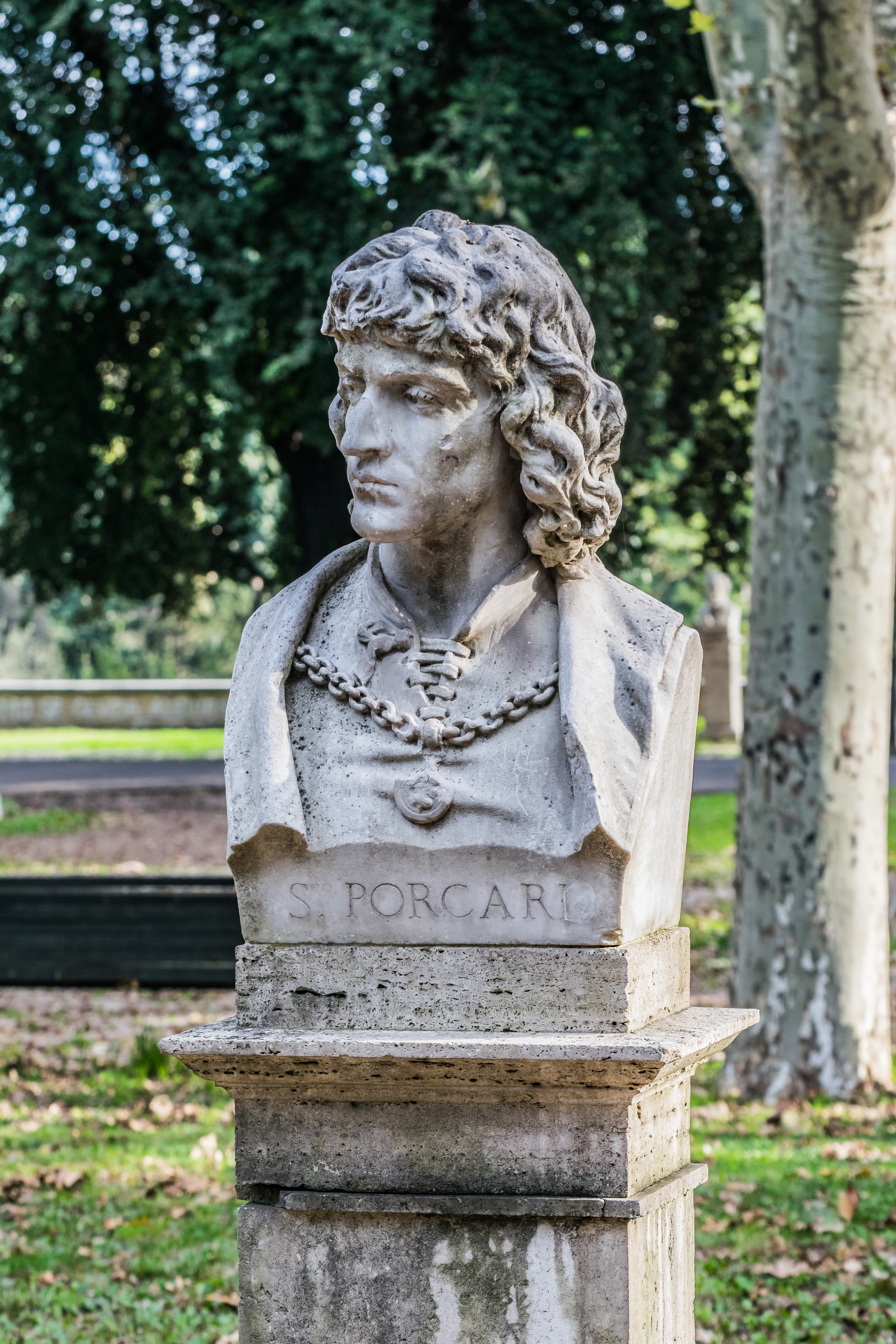

Stefano Porcari (1391 - 9 January 1453) was an Italian politician and humanist from Rome, known as the leader of a rebellion against Pope Nicholas V and the Papal secular authority in Rome.

== Biography ==
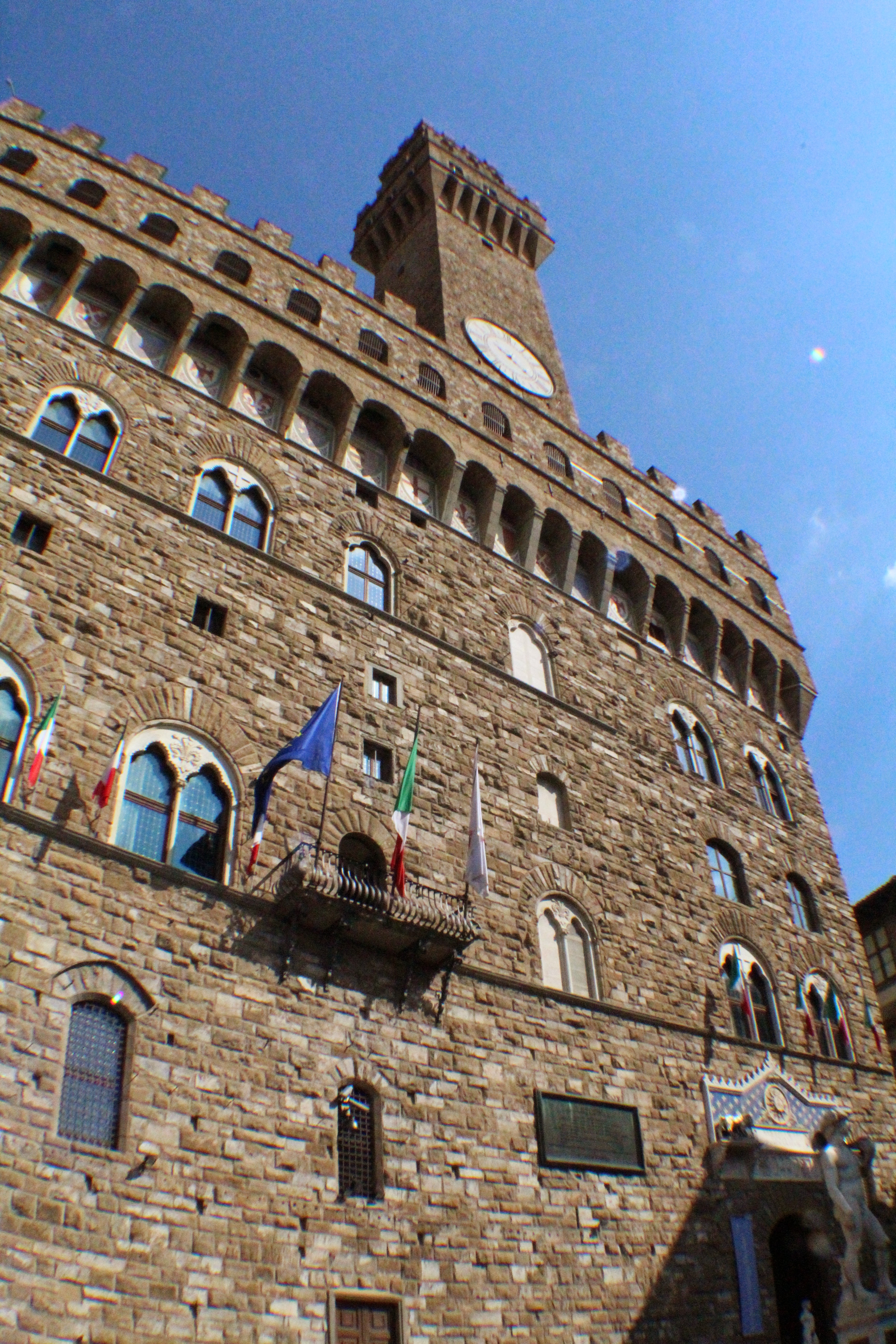
Palazzo della Signoria (Palazzo Vecchio), Florence

Porcari was born into a wealthy family of Rome. He received a humanist education and became an admirer of the ancient Roman Republic. Porcari trained as a lawyer, and in 1427 and 1428 was elected capitano del popolo of Florence under the protection of Pope Martin V. There he met the humanist scholar Leonardo Bruni and the Camaldolese monk Ambrose Traversari. While in Florence, it was Porcari's habit, during public celebrations, to give speeches from a balcony on the Palazzo della Signoria, exhorting the people to honor justice, as the foundation of the commune. He then traveled to France and Germany.

After his return to Italy in 1430, he held several positions in Italian communes such as the podestà of Bologna (1432), Siena (1434), Orvieto (1435) and was also governor of the fortress of Trani. He came back to Rome under the rule of Pope Eugenius IV. When the latter died and before the new pope was elected, he repeatedly addressed the populace to overthrow the papal rule, and to replace them by one based on the ancient Roman republic.

The new pope, Nicholas V, pardoned him, but kept him away from Rome with several assignments.

However, his participation in other plots (including one connected with the crowning of Frederick III in Rome), and an inflammatory speech in the Piazza Navona against the government, led the pope to exile him to Bologna. Roberto Cessi suggests that if this was taken as anything more than a criticism of the local city administrators, he would have been dealt with more harshly.

In late December 1452 Porcari was able to escape and return to Rome. Here he organized an insurrection whose result would be the proclamation of the Republic and, for Porcari, the title of tribune, the same held by Cola di Rienzo in the 14th century. The action was set for the Feast of the Epiphany, 6 January 1453, and would be backed by some three hundred mercenaries. George of Trebizond claimed to have become aware of the conspiracy, through a disaffected priest, nearly a year before and attempted to warn Pope Nicholas.

Nicholas V, warned by Cardinal Basilios Bessarion that Porcari had disappeared, ordered investigations. Porcari had planned to arrest Nicholas at Old St. Peter's Basilica and kill members of the curia. Among the co-conspirators were Stefano Infessura and members of the Orsini. The conspirators were captured, including Porcari, who had tried to take shelter in the house of prince Latino Orsini. He was subsequently tried and hanged at Castel Sant'Angelo on 9 January 1453.

Of Porcari's literary works, sixteen concioni (discourses) have survived. The description of his revolt was provided by Leon Battista Alberti in the epistle De porcario coniuratione.
