= Stefano Infessura =

Stefano Infessura (c. 1435 – c. 1500) was an Italian humanist historian and lawyer. He is remembered through his municipalist Diary of the City of Rome, a partisan chronicle of events at Rome by the Colonna family's point of view. He was in a position to hear everything that circulated in informed Roman circles, for he was the longtime secretary of the Roman Senate. Anecdotes that Infessura relates may be colored by his own partisan nature, but his diary faithfully records news that was making the rounds in the city, whether true or not; "he inserted every fragment of the most preposterous and malevolent gossip current in Roman society, and is therefore not considered a reliable chronicler" (New Catholic Dictionary).

Infessura's diary, partly in Latin and partly in ancient Romanesco, the Diarium urbis Romae (Diario della Città di Roma) is of special firsthand value for the pontificates of Paul II (1464-1471), Sixtus IV (1471-1484), Innocent VIII (1484-1492), and the beginning of Alexander VI's pontificate.

Infessura took a degree of Doctor of Laws and served as a judge, before he came to the University of Rome as professor of Roman law. According to the Catholic Encyclopedia, "Under Sixtus IV, his office was affected by the financial measures of that pope, who frequently withheld the income of the Roman University, applied it to other uses, and reduced the salaries of the professors". That may not provide adequate motivation for Infessura's deep opposition to Sixtus' policies, and for anecdotes that would be certainly scurrilous if they are untrue.

Infessura became entangled in the conspiracy of Stefano Porcari against Nicholas V (1453), which aimed at overturning the papal secular powers in Rome and the Papal States and reviving the Roman republic of antiquity. Among the paganizing Humanists of the Roman Academy under Pomponio Leto, Infessura certainly belonged to the antipapal faction.

Papst and other Catholic authors take pains to discredit the story of Innocent VIII's deathbed. As the Pope sank into a coma, "the harrowing story was told that, at the suggestion of a Jewish physician, the blood of three boys was infused into the dying pontiff’s mouth (the concept of circulation and methods for intravenous access did not exist at that time). They were ten years old, and had been promised a ducat each. All three died." Historians of medicine note this event as the first recorded historical attempt at a blood transfusion.
