= Alessandro Oliva =

Italian Roman Catholic cardinal

His Eminence Alessandro Oliva
- Cardinal-Priest of Santa Susanna
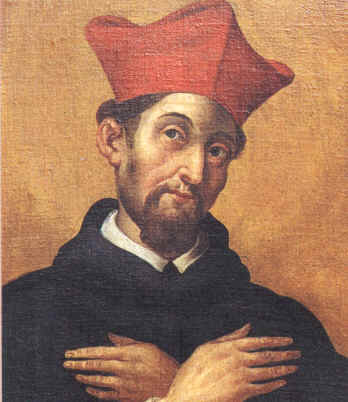
- Cardinal Oliva
- Church: Catholic Church
- Installed: 19 March 1460
- Term ended: 20 August 1463
- Predecessor: Filippo Calandrini
- Successor: Jean Balue
- Other posts: Administrator of Camerino (1461-1463)
- Previous posts: Camerlengo of the Sacred College of Cardinals (1461)

Orders
- Created cardinal: 5 March 1460 by Pope Pius II
- Rank: Cardinal-Priest

Personal details
- Born: Alessandro Oliva; 1407 Sassoferrato, Italy
- Died: 20 August 1463 (aged 55–56) Tivoli, Italy
- Buried: Sant'Agostino

Alessandro Oliva (1407–1463) (called the Cardinal of Santa Susanna) was an Italian Roman Catholic cardinal.

== Biography ==
Alessandro Oliva was born in Sassoferrato in 1409, the son of Alerenzio and Giovanna Oliva. His family was relatively humble in station. When he was three years old, he fell in a well, and was presumed dead when he was retrieved from the well; after he recovered nine hours later, his mother, believing his recovery was a miracle, his mother pledged the boy to the Order of the Hermits of St. Augustine.

Oliva entered the Order of the Hermits of St. Augustine in 1413. He was sent to Matelica and later to Perugia to be educated. In Perugia, at age 12, he began his novitiate. As one of the best students, he was sent to the Studio generale in Rimini to complete his studies, and then entered the seminary there in 1423. He was then sent to Rome for eight years. In 1431, the prior of his order, Gregorio da Rimini, made Oliva a cursor in Rimini; then sent him to Perugia, where he became a lector in 1433. In Rimini, he received his baccalaureatus and regentis in 1436 and his magistralem lauream in 1438.

After he was ordained as a priest, Oliva became a professor at the Augustinian convent at Perugia, a post he held for twenty years. In 1439, he was elected to a three-year term as provincial superior of his order for the March of Ancona. He became prior of his convent at Pergugia in 1449. He was elected Vicar of the Congregation of Perugia in 1452, 1456, and 1458. Pope Eugene IV later named him Procurator General of his entire order. He took part in the Council of Florence. In 1458, Pope Pius II had him elected Vicar General of his order. In 1459, he was elected the 28th Prior General of the Order of the Hermits of St. Augustine.

During this period, Oliva delivered many sermons throughout Italy, especially in Naples, Siena, Florence, Bologna, Mantua, Ferrara, and Venice. He gained a reputation as a great sacred orator, especially for his sermons on the Nativity of Christ.

In the consistory celebrated at Siena on 5 March 1460, Pope Pius II made Oliva a cardinal priest without Oliva's prior knowledge. He received the red hat on 8 March 1460 and the titular church of Santa Susanna on 19 March 1460.

In 1460, he traveled to Ancona to receive Thomas Paleologus, the deposed Byzantine Emperor. The emperor presented the cardinal with the skull of Saint Andrew; Cardinal Oliva later took this relic to Rome, accompanied by Cardinals Basilios Bessarion and Francesco Todeschini Piccolomini.

He was the Camerlengo of the Sacred College of Cardinals for 1461.

On 16 November 1461 he was named apostolic administrator of the see of Camerino, a post he held until his death.

He died in Tivoli on 20 August 1463. Pope Pius II officiated at his funeral. He is buried in Sant'Agostino.

Catholic Church titles
| Preceded by Pietro Barbo | Camerlengo of the Sacred College of Cardinals; 1461 | Succeeded by Niccolò Fortiguerra |
