= Ulrich Zell =

German printer (d. 1507)

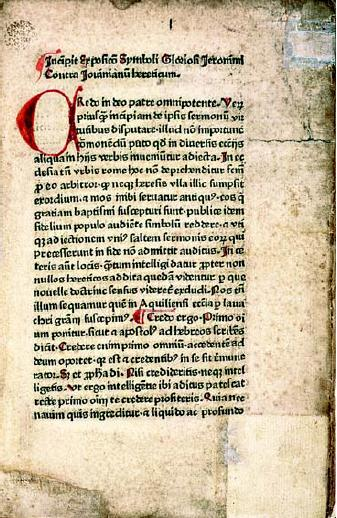
A leaf from the Expositio symboli, ca. 1470, National Library of Poland.

Ulrich Zell (died c.1507) was an early printer in Cologne, Germany.

== Biography ==
Zell was born at Hanau am Main, date unknown. He learned the art of printing before 1462 in the printing establishment of Johann Fust and Peter Schöffer, and seems, shortly after the catastrophe of 1462, to have gone to Cologne, whose university gave promise of a market for printed works. Zell was printing at Cologne apparently as early as 1463, although his first dated book is 1466. His work as printer and publisher can be traced up to the year 1502.

At first he called himself clericus (of the lower orders), but as early as 1471 he married and became a citizen and householder of Cologne. In 1473 he bought the important manorial estate of "Lyskirchen", to which he transferred the main part of his business. In the colophons of his books the place of business is called "apud Lyskirchen". The purchase, sometime later, of various houses, lands, and properties yielding revenues, show that Zell had become a prosperous man. It is also proof of his importance that for a long time he filled the office of Kirchenmeister (church-master) of "S. Maria an Lyskirchen".

== Publications ==
Altogether about 120 of his publications are known. Of these, however, only nine bear his name, but in all probability he printed and published many more. In outline and cut his six kinds of type are strikingly similar to the "Durandus" and "Clements" types of Fust and Schoffer; it would even seem that a number of the matrices of the "Clements" type had been used. Most of the books printed by Zell were text-books in quarto form for the university. Among the fine productions of his printing shop is an undated edition of the Latin Bible in two volumes.

Of much importance in the history of the discovery of printing is Zell's statement, preserved in the Chronicle of Cologne of 1499, that the year 1450 was the date of the beginning of printing, that the country-squire Johann Gutenberg was the inventor of it, and that the first book printed was the Latin Bible, the Vulgate.
