= Pietro Paolo Agabito =

Italian painter (1470s–1540s)

Pietro Paolo Agabito/Agabiti
- Born: c. 1470; Sassoferrato, Marche, Italy
- Died: c. 1540; Cupramontana, Marche, Italy
- Occupations: Painter, sculptor, architect

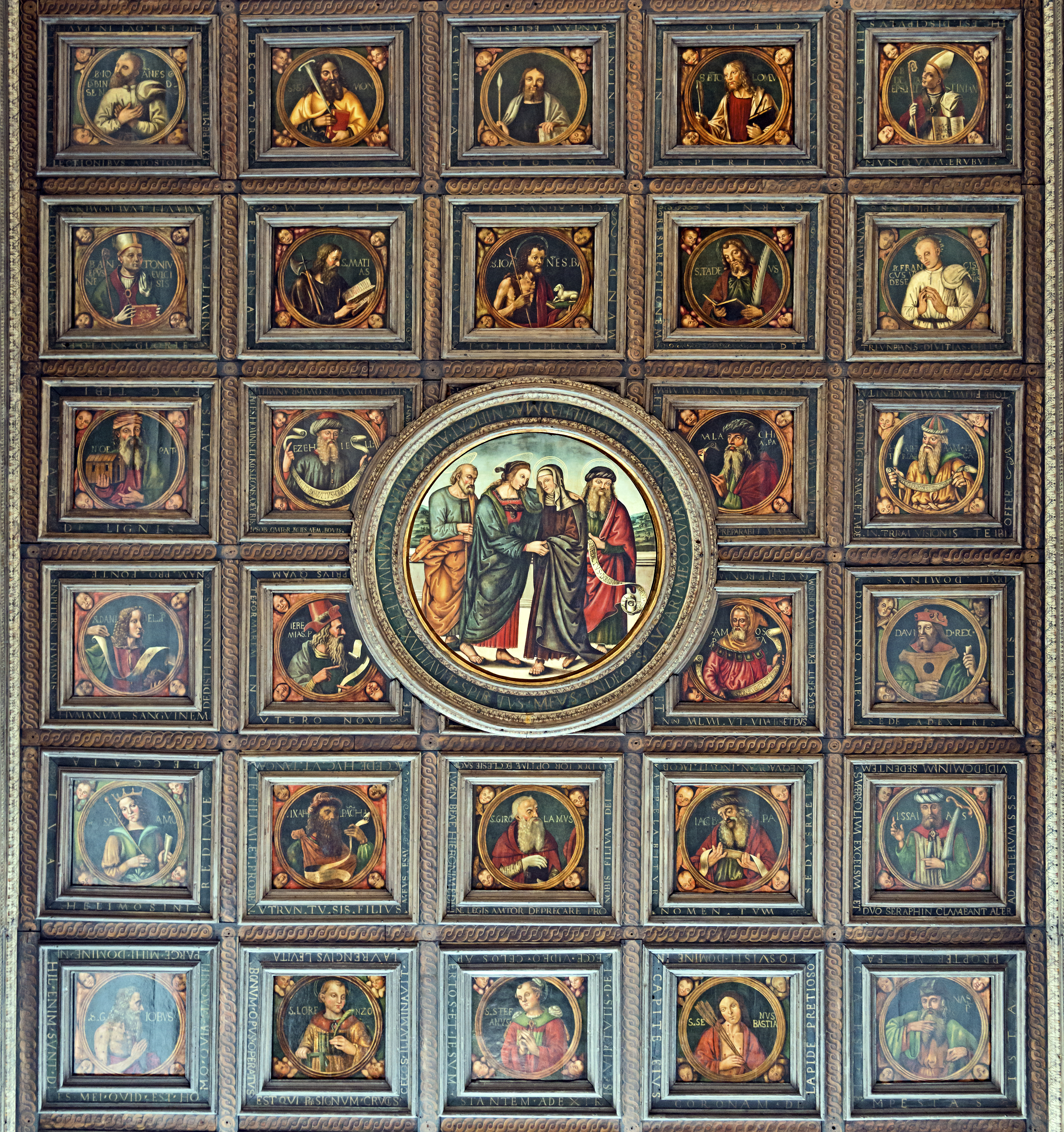
Coffered nave ceiling of Santa Maria della Pietà depicting the meeting between the young Mary and her cousin Elizabeth

Pietro Paolo Agabito or Agabiti (c. 1470 – c. 1540) was an Italian Renaissance painter, sculptor, and architect from the region of Marche. His style is rather provincial, and most surviving works are in the churches and museums of the region. He may have trained with Carlo Crivelli, and among the artists generally credited with having influenced his style are the Venetians Cima da Conegliano and Alvise Vivarini, the Bolognese artist Francesco Francia and Marco Palmezzano of Forlì. However, Agabiti did not keep up with the changes of style occurring in the early sixteenth century, remaining attached to the more formal style of the fifteenth century.

== Biography ==
He was born at Sassoferrato. He probably started by working in the ceramics factory of his father. He may well have travelled to Venice in 1497 because his first known work, of the Enthroned Virgin between Saints Peter and Sebastian, shows clear Venetian influence. It can now be found in the Museo Civico in Padua.

He may also have become a pupil of Carlo Crivelli, a well-known Venetian artist who moved to and spent much of his career in the Marche. Agabiti had returned to the Marche by 1502 and in 1507 was resident in Jesi. He is documented in his native town of Sassoferrato from 1510 onwards, producing altarpieces for local churches. Several can still be found in the churches for which they were painted but others are now in the Museo Civico in Sassoferrato, in the Pinacoteca Civica in Jesi or in private collections. He has always been seen as a minor, regional artist and few of his works are to be found in foreign collections. Exceptions include a Nativity now in the Christian Museum (Hungary) in Esztergom.

In 1531, he retired to the Convento dell'Eremita, Cupramontana, another town in the Marche region, where he died approximately nine years later.
