= Pope Pius II =

Head of the Catholic Church from 1458 to 1464

- Bishop of Rome
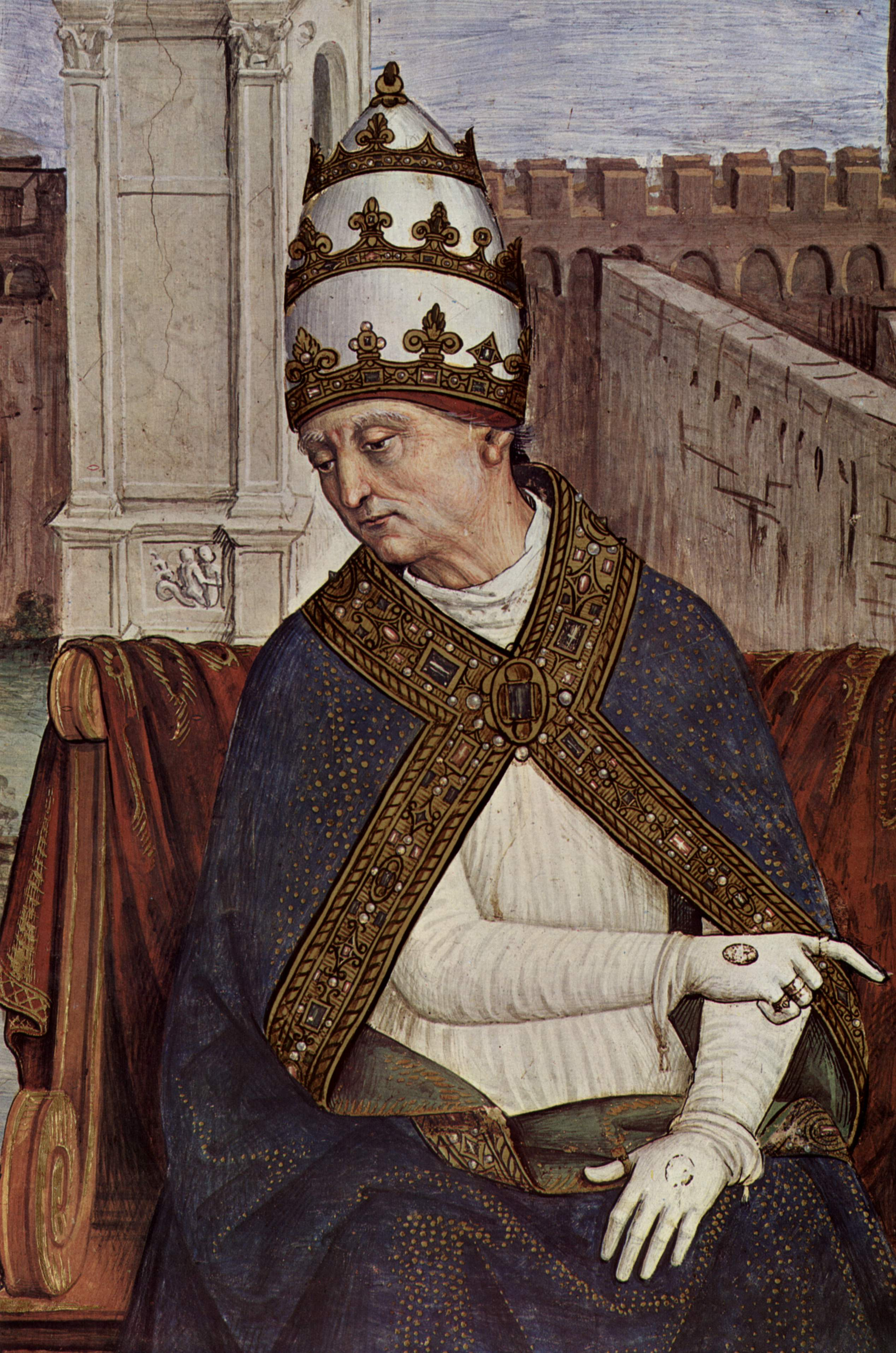
- Fresco portrait by Pinturicchio in the Piccolomini library of Siena Cathedral, made c. 1500
- Church: Catholic Church
- Papacy began: 19 August 1458
- Papacy ended: 14 August 1464
- Predecessor: Callixtus III
- Successor: Paul II

Orders
- Ordination: 4 March 1447
- Consecration: 15 August 1447 by Juan Carvajal
- Created cardinal: 17 December 1456 by Callixtus III

Personal details
- Born: Enea Silvio Bartolomeo Piccolomini; 18 October 1405 Corsignano, Republic of Siena
- Died: 14 August 1464 (aged 58) Ancona, Papal States
- Coat of arms: Pius II's coat of arms

Pope Pius II (Latin: Pius PP. II, Italian: Pio II), born Enea Silvio Bartolomeo Piccolomini (Latin: Aeneas Silvius Bartholomeus; 18 October 1405 – 14 August 1464), was head of the Catholic Church and ruler of the Papal States from 19 August 1458 to his death in 1464.

Aeneas Silvius was an author, diplomat, and orator, and private secretary of Antipope Felix V and then the Emperor Frederick III, and then Pope Eugenius IV. He participated in the Council of Basel, but left it in 1443 to follow Frederick, whom he reconciled to the Roman obedience. He became Bishop of Trieste in 1447, Bishop of Siena in 1450, and a cardinal in 1456.

He was a Renaissance humanist with an international reputation. Aeneas Silvius' longest and most enduring work is the story of his life, the Commentaries, which was the first autobiography of a pope to have been published. It appeared posthumously, in 1584, 120 years after his death.

== Early life ==
Aeneas was born in Corsignano in Sienese territory of a noble but impoverished family. His father Silvio was a soldier and member of the House of Piccolomini, and his mother was Vittoria Forteguerri, who had eighteen children including several twins, though no more than ten were alive at one time. The plague (iniqua lues) finally left him with only two sisters, Laudamia and Catherina. He worked with his father in the fields for some years.

In 1423, at the age of 18, he left to study at the university of Siena, where he first followed the humanities curriculum, and then that of civil law. At Siena he studied under the Augustinian Andreas of Milan, the noted historian. His preceptor and professor of civil law was Antonio de Rosellis. He also studied law under Mariano Sozzini. He then attended the university of Florence where he studied under Francesco Filelfo, and where he became friends with Poggio Bracciolini, Leonardo Bruni, and Guarino da Verona. He settled in Siena as a teacher.

== Basel ==
In 1431 he accepted the post of secretary to Domenico Capranica, bishop of Fermo, then on his way to the Council of Basel. Capranica was protesting against the new Pope Eugene IV's refusal of a cardinalate for him, which had been designated by Pope Martin V. Arriving at Basel after enduring a stormy voyage to Genoa and then a trip across the Alps, he successively served Capranica, who ran out of money, and then other masters.

In 1435, he was sent by Cardinal Niccolò Albergati, Eugenius IV's legate at the council, on a secret mission to Scotland, the object of which is variously related even by himself. He visited England as well as Scotland, underwent many perils and vicissitudes in both countries and left an account of each. The journey to Scotland proved so tempestuous that Piccolomini swore that he would walk barefoot to the nearest shrine of Our Lady from their landing port. This proved to be Dunbar; the nearest shrine was 10 miles (16 km) distant at Whitekirk. The journey through the ice and snow left Aeneas afflicted with pain in his legs for the rest of his life. Only when he arrived at Newcastle did he feel that he had returned to "a civilised part of the world and the inhabitable face of the Earth", Scotland and the far north of England being "wild, bare and never visited by the sun in winter". In Scotland, he fathered a child but it died.

Upon his return to Basel, Aeneas again served from 1436 to 1438 as secretary of Cardinal Domenico Capranica. He actively supported the council in its conflict with the Pope, and, although still a layman, eventually obtained a share in the direction of its affairs. He gave a speech advocating the choice of Pavia as the site of a meeting between council members and the Greek delegation, to discuss church union, which caught the attention of the duke of Milan, as he had hoped. The archbishop of Milan named him Provost of the church of S. Lorenzo in Milan, even though he had not been elected to the post by the chapter of the church and was still a layman. The Council granted him a dispensation, despite their policy against such dispensations, which they considered a feature of papal corruption. But when Aeneas was sent on a diplomatic mission to Vienna in 1438, it was reported that he had died; and the duke of Milan, who had abandoned the council and returned to Pope Eugenius' side, gave Aeneas' provostship to another candidate. In recompense, the Council appointed him a canon in the cathedral Chapter of Trent.

He refused the offer of the diaconate, shunning the ecclesiastical state because of the obligation of sexual continence which it imposed. Even the offer to become one of the electors of a successor to Pope Eugene IV was not enough for him to overcome his reluctance. He supported the creation of the Antipope Felix V (Amadeus, Duke of Savoy) in November 1439, and participated in his coronation.

In 1440, he composed a work in defense of the authority of the general council of Basel, the Libellus dialogorum de generalis concilii auctoritate et gestis Basileensium.

Aeneas then was sent to Strasbourg, where he fathered a child, a son, with a Breton woman called Elizabeth. The baby died 14 months later.

Piccolomini served briefly as secretary to Pope Felix, and in 1442 was sent as envoy to the Diet of Frankfurt. On 27 July 1442, in Frankfurt, Frederick III, King of the Romans celebrated him as Poet Laureate, and offered him a position at court as his secretary. In January 1443, Aeneas resigned as secretary of Felix V, and was appointed secretary and protonotary in the imperial chancellery. There he obtained the patronage of the emperor's chancellor, Kaspar Schlick. Some identify the love adventure that Aeneas related in his romance The Tale of Two Lovers (1444) with an escapade of the chancellor. Of his activities at this period in his life, Ferdinand Gregorovius, the historian of medieval Rome, wrote, "Versed in the affairs of the Empire and the Roman Curia, in which occupations he incessantly strove to acquire benefices that should raise him out of poverty, Piccolomini was not inspired by any ardent longing for virtue, nor was he stirred by the sublime genius of an exalted nature. There was nothing great in him. Endowed with fascinating gifts, this man of brilliant parts possessed no enthusiasms. We cannot even say that he pursued any aim beyond that of his own advantage."

Aeneas' character had hitherto been that of a man of the world with no strictness in morals or consistency in politics. Being sent on a mission to Rome in 1445, with the ostensible object of inducing Pope Eugene to convoke a new council, he was absolved from ecclesiastical censures and returned to Germany under an engagement to assist the Pope. This he did most effectually by the diplomatic dexterity with which he smoothed away differences between the papal court of Rome and the German imperial electors. He played a leading role in concluding a compromise in 1447 by which the dying Pope Eugenius accepted the reconciliation tendered by the German princes. The documents were signed on 5 and 7 February 1447. As a result, the council and the antipope were left without support.

=== Bishop ===
He was ordained a priest in Vienna on 4 March 1446.

Pope Eugenius died on 23 February 1447, and the conclave to choose his successor lasted from 4 to 6 March 1447. Aeneas Sylvius was one of the four ambassadors chosen to be the guardians of the conclave. The new pope, Tommaso Parentucelli, chose the name Nicholas V, and immediately confirmed Aeneas in his posts of papal subdeacon and secretary, and appointed him to carry the papal cross at his coronation. One of the first acts of Pope Nicholas was to appoint Aeneas Bishop of Trieste on 17 April 1447.

On 13 August 1447, at Cologne, Bishop Aeneas wrote the first Epistola retractationis, ad Magistr. Jordanum.

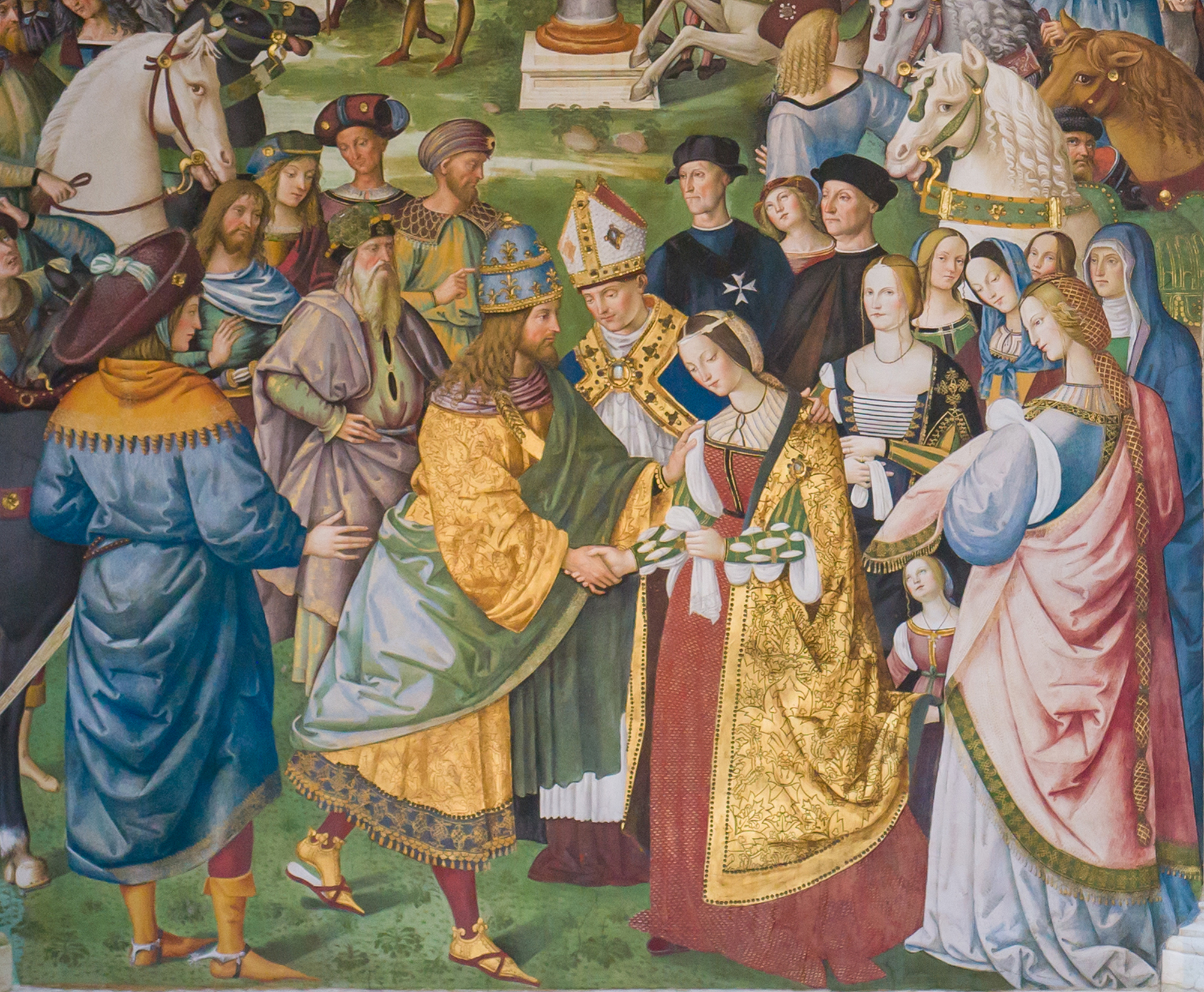
Enea Silvio Piccolomini presents Emperor Frederick III with his bride-to-be Eleanore of Portugal; fresco by Pinturicchio in the Piccolomini library in Siena Cathedral

Pope Nicholas transferred him to the diocese of Siena on 23 September 1450.

In 1450, Aeneas was sent as ambassador by Emperor Frederick III to negotiate his marriage with Princess Eleonore of Portugal. In 1451, he undertook a mission to Bohemia and concluded a satisfactory arrangement with the Hussite leader George of Poděbrady. In 1452 he accompanied Frederick to Rome, where Frederick wedded Eleanor and was crowned emperor by the pope. At the coronation, speaking in the name of the emperor, Aeneas repudiated the conciliar theory, holding that the pope and his cardinals were the best council.

Bishop Aeneas Sylvius was a delegate of Frederick III at the Diet of Ratisbon in February 1454.

In August 1455, Aeneas again travelled to Rome on an embassy which included Johann Hinderbach to proffer the obedience of Germany to the new pope, Callixtus III. The ceremony took place on 12 August in a public consistory. As instructed, the envoys pressed the pope for a war against the Turks, which pleased Callixtus, who was of the same mind. He brought strong recommendations from Frederick and Ladislaus V of Hungary (also King of Bohemia) for the nomination of Aeneas to the cardinalate, but delays arose from the Pope's resolution to promote his own nephews first, which he did on 17 September 1456.

Finally, on 17 December 1456, he was named a cardinal, and next day he was assigned the titular church of Santa Sabina on the Aventine. He was allowed to keep the diocese of Siena. He also acquired the bishopric of Warmia (Ermel and, Prussia; now in Poland) on 12 August 1457.

== Election to papacy ==
Calixtus III died on 6 August 1458. The leading candidate was Cardinal Domenico Capranica, but he died on 14 August, during the Novendiales. The ambassador of the Duke of Milan wrote on 31 July that Cardinal Juan de Torquemada and Cardinal Filippo Calandrini, the half-brother of Pope Nicholas V, were also candidates, and he thought that Calandrini might win. Aeneas and his friend Cardinal Calandrini of Bologna immediately headed from Viterbo to Rome, and when they reached the gate of the city, they were met by a friendly assembly of courtiers and common people, who shouted that one or the other of them would be made pope. On the evening of the death of Cardinal Capranica, the Milanese ambassador indicated it would be possible to carry the election of Piccolomini, who was being supported by the king of Naples.

On 16 August, the cardinals entered into a papal conclave. Eighteen cardinals took part. The Italian cardinals were outnumbered by the foreigners. According to Aeneas' account, the wealthy cardinal Guillaume d'Estouteville, Archbishop of Rouen, though a Frenchman and a blood cousin of the king of France, seemed certain to be elected. On 18 August, the first scrutiny took place; Aeneas and Calandrini each received 5 votes, while no one else received more than three. Whether out of trickery or out of hatred, no cardinal gave a vote for d'Estouteville. The results contradicted the expectations. D'Estouteville then set out to frustrate the ambitions of Aeneas. The second ballot took place on 19 August; the results gave Piccolomini 9 votes, and D'Estouteville 6. After intense intrigue among the cardinals, including a private meeting of the Italian cardinals, who were urged by Cardinal Barbo of Venice to choose the Italian Piccolomini over the French d'Estouteville, Aeneas was able to secure enough votes for his candidacy after the second ballot at the accessio, to be elected with 12 votes. All 18 cardinals then ratified the election. He was crowned Pope on the front steps of St. Peter's Basilica on 3 September 1458 by the Protodeacon, Cardinal Prospero Colonna.

== Papal policies and initiatives ==
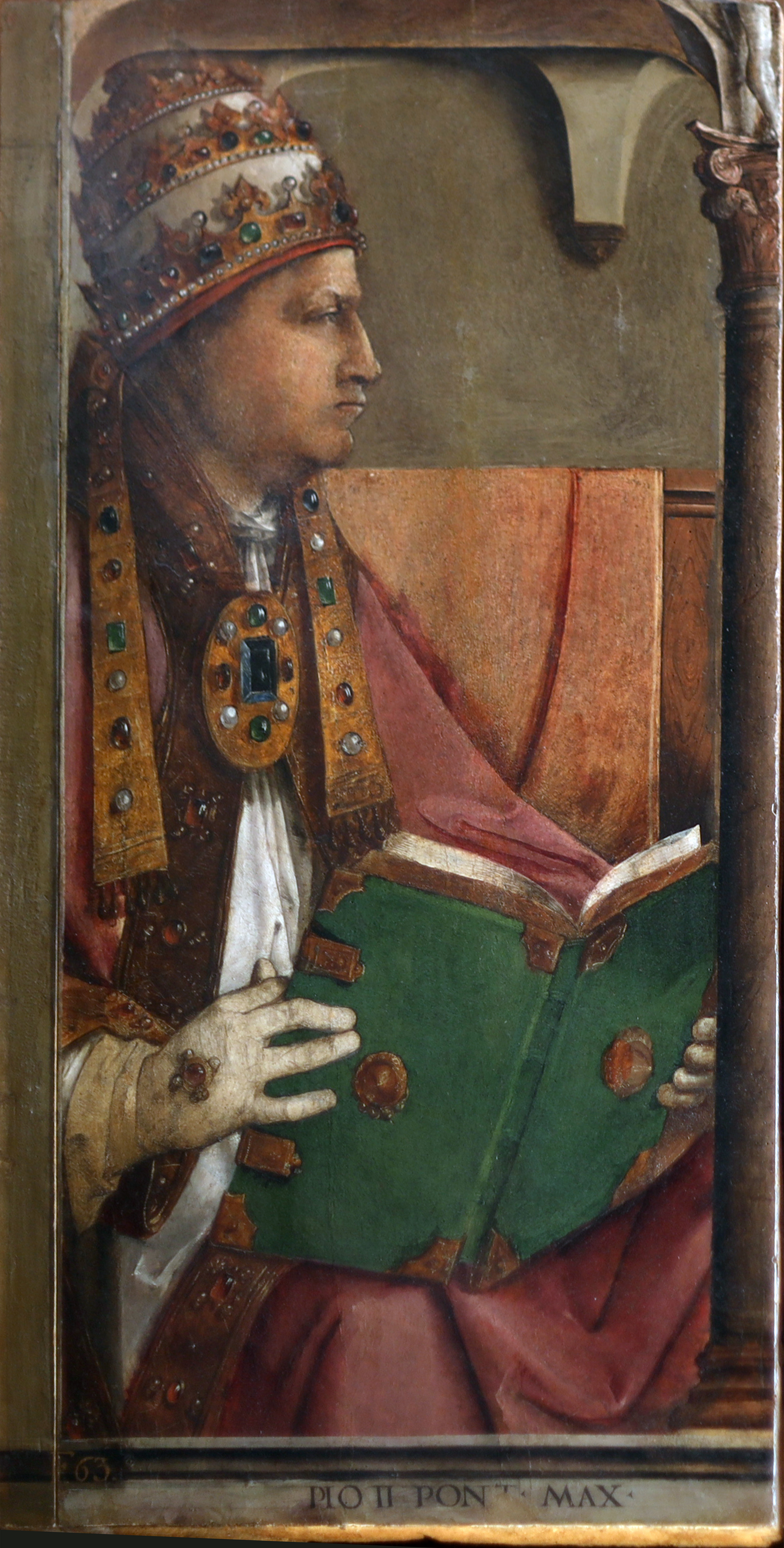
Portrait by van Gent and Berruguete c. 1470

From the first day of his papacy, Pius' greatest priority was freeing Europe from the threat of the Turks, through a great crusade. He had also been preparing a bull, which in the event he never published, outlining his plans for a reform of the Roman Curia.

=== Congress at Mantua ===
After allying himself with Ferdinand (Ferrante), the Aragonese claimant to the throne of Naples, in opposition to the French House of Anjou, his next important act was to convene a congress of the representatives of Christian princes at Mantua for joint action against the Turks. In anticipation of his departure for Mantua, Pius issued the bull "Cum Concedente Deo" on 5 January 1459, in which he considered the possibility of the pope dying outside Rome; he ordered that the conclave to elect his successor should take place only in Rome, contrary to previous practice. On 11 January 1459 Pope Pius appointed Cardinal Nicholas of Cusa Vicar-General of the city of Rome and of the Patrimony of S. Peter; and on 15 January he named Bishop Galeazzo Cavrini of Mantua his Governor of Rome. He finally set out for the north on 22 January.

While at Mantua, he undertook to mediate in the dispute between Sigismund of Austria and Cardinal Nicholas of Cusa over the bishopric of Brixen, which had been given Nicholas by Pope Nicholas V in 1450, without the consent of the emperor, the count of Tyrol (Sigismund), or the cathedral chapter of Brixen. A public reconciliation was arranged, but no resolution of the basic problem was achieved, but rather postponed to a Diet to be held at Trent two years in the future. Sigismund, who had not been friendly toward the papacy for some years, left Mantua on 29 November 1459, even more irritated than before. Pius' efforts had failed. Both returned to the north, and in April 1460 trouble broke out again. Cusa, who was at Bruneck and engaged in negotiations with Sigismund, was surrounded, captured by the archduke, and forced to agree to Sigismund's demands. Cusa appealed to Pius II. A restrained Pius only summoned Sigismund to appear before him and explain his conduct, but Sigismund appealed to a future council in a statement handed the pope by his proctor on 4 August 1460. On 8 August, Sigismund was excommunicated and his domains were placed under the interdict.

On 26 September 1459, Pope Pius had called for a new crusade against the Ottomans, and on 14 January 1460, he proclaimed the official crusade that was to last for three years. The pope influenced Vlad III Dracula, whom he held in high regard, to start a war against Sultan Mehmed II of Turkey. This conflict at its peak involved the Wallachians trying to assassinate the Sultan (see The Night Attack).

After his departure from Mantua on 19 January 1460, Pius II reached his former bishopric of Siena on 30 January, where, exhausted by his exertions at Mantua, he was advised by his doctors to rest, either in the city or at the Petriolo hot springs. There he was joined by his recent host in Mantua, Ludovico Gonzaga. Pius described his delight with country life in very pleasing language.

=== New cardinals ===
At the same time, since he had long been concerned with the content of the College of Cardinals and with the behavior of some of its members, The French faction among the cardinals, especially d'Estouteville and Alain de Coëtivy, obstructed every move that might harm King Louis XI, who was hostile to the idea of a crusade. Two cardinals had died six months previously, Antonio de la Cerda y Lloscos and the Infante Jaime of Portugal. Some of the Italian cardinals, led by the Patriarch of Aquileia, Lodovico Scampi, were hostile to him personally and skeptical of his project. Pius decided to hold a consistory for the creation of new cardinals. Suggestions poured in from all sides, petitioning for at least ten new cardinals. During Lent of 1460, he began consultations with the current cardinals, whose consent was necessary.

On 4 March 1460, the Wednesday of Ember Days, a formal consistory was held to make the final decisions on the candidates. Pope Pius' opening address was frank and detailed in cataloguing the shortcomings and faults of the luxurious lifestyle of the cardinals, and their activities on behalf of monarchs rather than the church: "Your lifestyle is such that you would appear to have been chosen, not to govern the state, but called to enjoy pleasures. You avoid neither hunting, nor games, nor the company of women. You put together parties that are more opulent than is fitting. You wear clothes that are far too expensive. You overflow with gold and silver.... We can't keep people from making requests, but we can easily refuse to entertain them. Think about who are appropriate, and I will choose from among their number...." He then gave the names of those who nominated themselves, or who had been nominated by others." When he finished, Cardinal Scarampi rose to speak. He remarked that Pius' predecessors had named nobles, eminent for learning and holy life. But he was proposing people whom Scarampi would not employ in his kitchen or in his stables. In fact, according to the cardinal, there was no need for new cardinals: "With too many of us, our value declines."

Finally, Pius was able to secure a positive vote on five names, and he was able to pressure the cardinals into accepting his own nomination of a sixth. These were: Angelo Capranica, bishop of Rieti and brother of Cardinal Domenico Capranica; Bernardo Eroli, bishop of Spoleto; Niccolò Fortiguerra, bishop of Teano; Alessandro Oliva de Saxoferrato, the Prior General of the Order of Hermits of Saint Augustine (the pope's choice, whose candidacy was much resisted); Pius' nephew Francesco Todeschini-Piccolomini, a protonotary apostolic; and Burkhard von Weisbriach, archbishop of Salzburg. The appointment of Weisbriach was made in pectore, and was not published until 31 May 1462, to avoid offending the foreign powers. The five cardinals whose names were published were all Italians. On 7 March 1460, Pope Pius had to write to the Duke of Burgundy, Philip the Good, apologizing for having been unable to convince the cardinals to vote for the duke's almoner, Jean Jouffroy, bishop of Arras. He wrote that it was because the cardinals would have no ultramontanes as cardinals.

Pius was recalled to Rome, reaching the city on 6 October 1460. His presence was urged by the disturbances occasioned by Tiburzio di Maso, who, when captured, confessed that he had planned to overthrow the papal government and plunder the cardinals and merchants. He was executed on 31 October.

The European powers, however, had not ceased their pressure for the appointment of more cardinals. The cardinals, however, were insistent that there should be no creation of non-Italians. An agreement was finally reached that there would be six new cardinals, three Italians and three "ultramontani", thereby preserving the balance of power. On 18 December 1461, six cardinals were announced: Bartolomeo Roverella, archbishop of Ravenna; Jacopo Piccolomini-Ammannati, bishop of Pavia; Francesco Gonzaga, who was only 17; Jean Jouffroy, the nomination of Louis XI and Philip the Good; Louis d'Albret, son of the Count of Dreux; and Jaume Cardona, bishop of Urgel. The name of Burkhard von Weisbriach of Salzburg was also finally published.

=== Naples, Rimini, Poland ===
In the struggle for the Kingdom of Naples between the supporters of the House of Aragon and the House of Anjou, the Papal States were at this time troubled by rebellious barons and marauding condottieri, whom he gradually, though momentarily, quelled. The Neapolitan War was also concluded by the success of the Pope's ally the Aragonese Ferdinand.

In particular, the Pope engaged for most of his reign in what looked like a personal war against Sigismondo Pandolfo Malatesta, Lord of Rimini, with the result of the almost complete submission of that condottiero.

Pius II also tried mediation in the Thirteen Years' War of 1454–66 between Poland and the Teutonic Knights, but, when he failed to achieve success, cast an anathema over Polish and Prussians both.

Pius II was also engaged in a series of disputes with King George of Bohemia and Archduke Sigismund of Austria (who was excommunicated for having arrested Nicholas of Cusa, Bishop of Brixen).

In June 1461, Pius II canonized Saint Catherine of Siena.

In October 1461, he gained what at first appeared to be a brilliant success by inducing the new king of France, Louis XI, to abolish the Pragmatic Sanction of Bourges, by which the papal authority in France had been weakened. But Louis XI had expected that Pius II would in return espouse the French cause in Naples, and when he found himself disappointed he virtually re-established the Pragmatic Sanction by royal ordinances. Pius II built a fortress in Tivoli called Rocca Pia in 1461.

The Diocese of Ljubljana was established on 6 December 1461 by Frederick III, Holy Roman Emperor. On 9 September 1462, Pope Pius confirmed the action.

=== Crusade ===
The crusade for which the Congress of Mantua had been convoked made no progress. In November 1463, Pope Pius II tried to organize the crusade against the Ottomans, similar to what Nicholas V and Calixtus III had tried to do before him. Pius II invited all the Christian nobility to join, and the Venetians immediately answered the appeal. So did George Kastriot Skanderbeg the leader of Albanian resistance, who on 27 November 1463 declared war on the Ottomans and attacked their forces near Ohrid. Pius II's planned crusade envisioned assembling 20,000 soldiers in Taranto, and another 20,000 would be gathered by Skanderbeg. They would have been marshaled in Durazzo under Skanderbeg's leadership and would have formed the central front against the Ottomans. The Pope did his best: he addressed an eloquent letter to the Ottoman ruler, Mehmet II, urging him to become a Christian. The pope even suggested that if Mehmed were to convert, he would be recognized as "Emperor of the Greeks and of the East." If it was delivered, the invitation was not successful. In April 1462, a public pageant was staged for the pope to receive the relics of the head of Saint Andrew when it was brought from Patras in the Peloponnese to Rome by Thomas Palaeologus.

Pius II succeeded in reconciling the Emperor and the King of Hungary, and derived great encouragement as well as pecuniary advantage from the discovery of mines of alum in the papal territory at Tolfa, c. 1459. However, France was estranged; the Duke of Burgundy broke his positive promises; Milan was engrossed with the attempt to seize Genoa; Florence cynically advised the Pope to let the Turks and the Venetians wear each other out. Pius II was aware that he was nearing his end, and his malady probably prompted the feverish impatience with which, on 18 June 1464, he assumed the cross and departed for Ancona to conduct the crusade in person.

=== Slavery ===
Pius condemned the enslavement of newly baptized Christians as a "great crime". In a letter of 7 October 1462, addressed to the Bishop of Rubico in the Canary Islands, Pius instructed bishops to impose ecclesiastical penalties on transgressors. Pius did not condemn the concept of trading in slaves, only the enslavement of Christians, who represented a very small minority of those captured and taken to Portugal.

=== Pienza ===
Pope Pius II inaugurated an unusual urban project, perhaps the first city-planning exercise in modern Europe. He refurbished his hometown of Corsignano (province of Siena) and renamed it Pienza, after himself. A cathedral and palaces were built in the best style of the day to decorate the city. They survive to this day. He also issued a papal bull, Cum almam nostram urbem, on 28 April 1462, prohibiting damage to ancient ruins in Rome or Campagna.

== Illness and death ==
On 26 April 1463, Pius II published his most famous retraction in the bull "In Minoribus Agentes," addressed to the rector and members of the University of Cologne. In it, he withdrew his treatise against Pope Eugene IV and in favor of the Council of Basel. It contained the famous remark, "reject Aeneas, retain Pius" (Aeneam rejicite, Pium recipite).

In spite of suffering from a fever, Pope Pius II left Rome for Ancona on 18 June 1464, arriving on 18 July. He hoped to increase the morale of the crusading army. However, the armed forces melted away at Ancona for want of transport and the outbreak of pestilence, and when at last the Venetian fleet arrived, led by Doge Cristoforo Moro, the dying Pope could only view it from a window. He died two days later, on 14 August 1464.

The cardinals at Ancona decided to put the papal galleys in the hands of the doge of Venice, on the understanding that they would be handed over to the next pope. They also sent the 48,000 gold ducats which Pius had on hand for the crusade to Matthias of Hungary. The crusade of Pius II was at an end.

Despite the canonical requirement that the conclave to elect a successor should take place in the place where he died, Pius II's body was taken to Rome and interred at the Vatican, in Old St. Peter's Basilica, in the Chapel of St. Andrew. When his nephew, Pius III, died in 1503, he was buried next to Pius II. In 1506, because of the demolition of Old St. Peter's, the tombs were moved to the crypt. In 1612, when the church of St. Andrea della Valle was completed, the bodies of both popes, as well as parts of their funeral monuments, were moved there and re-entombed on 1 February 1613.

== Literary reputation and legacy ==
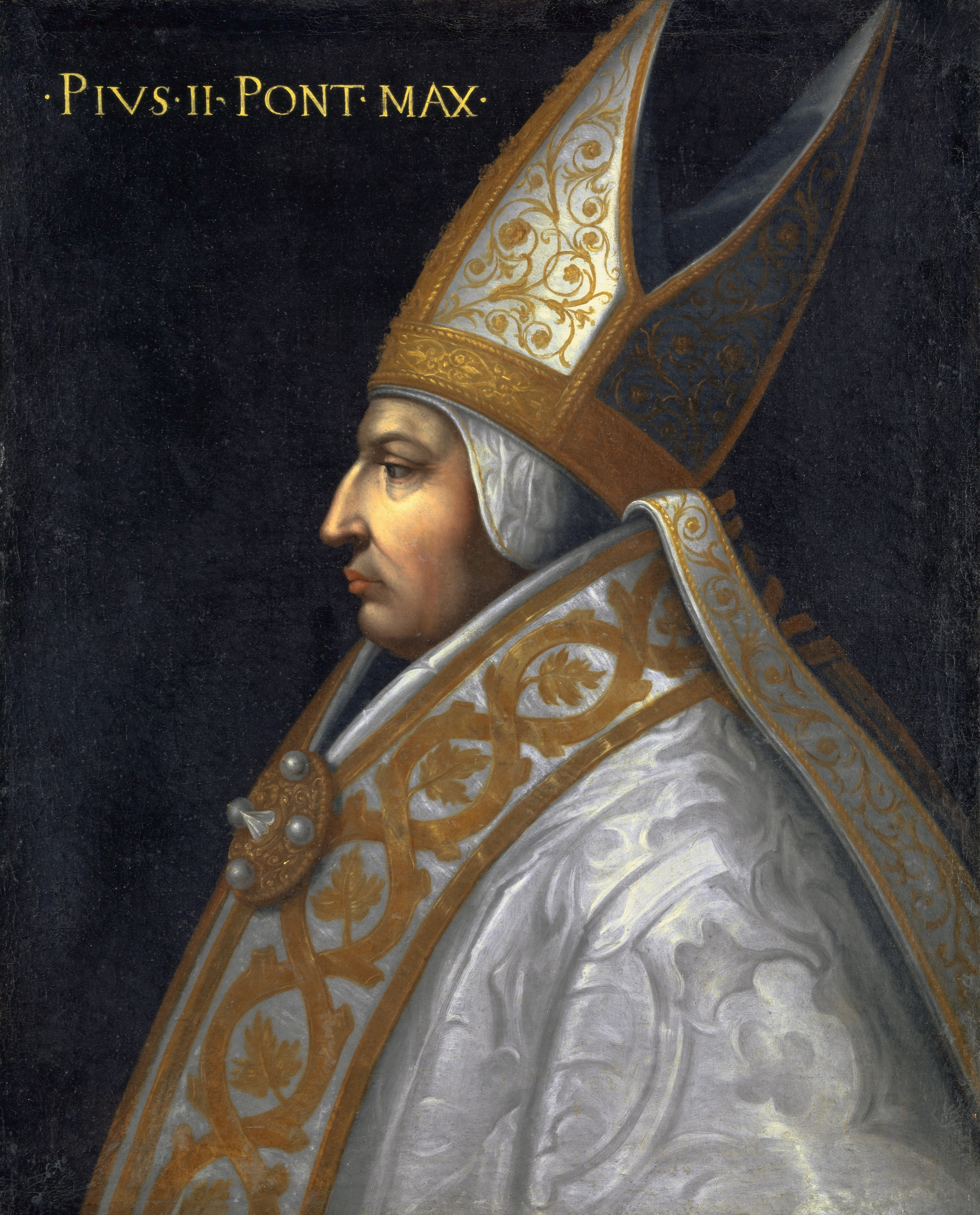
Pius II by Cristofano dell'Altissimo

Pius II was a prominent author of poetry in his lifetime, being named imperial poet laureate in 1442. But his reputation in belles lettres rests principally upon his The Tale of Two Lovers, an erotic novel. He also composed some comedies, of which only one (Chrysis) is extant. All of his works are in Latin. He also wrote numerous erotic poems. All of the erotic material was written before he was elected to the papacy.

His Epistles, which were collected by himself, are also an important source of historical information. His Epistles contain one of the best known descriptions of the enthronement ceremony of the Carinthian dukes on the Prince's Stone and the Duke's Chair. It is generally considered to be the source for Jean Bodin's description of the ceremony in his Six Livres de la République.

The most valuable of his historical writings are his histories of Bohemia and of Emperor Frederick III. He wrote definitional treatises on Europe and Asia, and in early and middle life produced numerous tracts on the political and theological controversies of his day. The pontiff even wrote an exhaustive refutation of Islam.

His most important and longest work is his autobiographical Commentaries, first published in 1584 in Rome by Archbishop Francesco Bandini Piccolomini, a distant relative. Bandini Piccolomini published it under the name of Iohannes Gobellinus, the scribe of the manuscript archetype of 1464, who was then named the author. Pius II chose to write Commentaries from the third-person perspective, following Caesar's example. This posthumous edition altered some content judged inappropriate.

Of his own work, Aeneas Silvius wrote, "My style of writing is unpolished and bald, but it is frank, and without trappings. I never write with labour, because I do not stretch after things which are too high for me, and which I do not know; but what I have learned I write."

== See also ==
- Cardinals created by Pius II
- Gregory of Heimburg, secretary to Pius II
- Pope Pius III, nephew of Pius II
- Bishops of Warmia
- Pienza

== Bibliography ==
- Ady, Cecilia M. (1913). Pius II (Æneas Silvius Piccolomini) the Humanist Pope. London: Methuen, 1913.
- Baldi, Barbara (2012). Il 'cardinale tedesco'. Enea Silvio Piccolomini fra impero, papato, Europa, (1442–1455). (in Italian). Milano: UNICOPLI 2012.
- Bisaha, Nancy (ed.); Brown, Robert (tr.) (2013). Aeneas Silvius Piccolomini, Europe (c. 1400–1458). Washington, DC: Catholic University of America Press, 2013.
- Boulting, William (1908). Æneas Silvius (Enea Silvio De' Piccolomini – Pius II.): Orator, Man of Letters, Statesman, and Pope. London: A. Constable and Company, 1908.
- Creighton, Mandell (1882). A History of the Papacy during the period of the Reformation. Vol. II. Boston: Houghton Mifflin.. pp. 235–260, 365–500.
- Garnett, Richard (1911). "Pius II," in: The Encyclopædia Britannica. 11th edition, Vol. 21 (Cambridge University Press 1911), pp. 683–684.
- Gragg, Florence Alden (translator); Gabel, Leona Christine (contributor) (1937). The Commentaries of Pius II. Northampton. Mass.: Smith College Department of History 1937. (Smith College Studies in History, Volume 22, nos. 1–2).
- Izbicki, Thomas; Gerald Christianson; Philip Krey (2006). Reject Aeneas, Accept Pius: Selected Letters of Aeneas Sylvius Piccolomini, Pope Pius II. Catholic University of America Press. ISBN 978-0-8132-1442-9..
- Leaños, Jaime (2011). "Opportunism or Self Awareness: The Misunderstood Persona of Pope Pius II," in: Imago Temporis. Medium Aevum Vol. V (Lieda Spain: University de Lieda 2011), pp. 243–263.
- Mitchell, Rosamond Joscelyne (1962). The Laurels and the Tiara: Pope Pius II, 1458–1464. London: Harvill Press, 1962.
- O'Brien, Emily (2015). The Commentaries of Pope Pius II (1458–1464) and the Crisis of the Fifteenth-Century Papacy. The University of Toronto Press. ISBN 978-1442647633..
- Pastor, Ludwig (1894). The History of the Popes, from the Close of the Middle Ages: Drawn from the Secret Archives of the Vatican and Other Original Sources. Volume 3 London: Kegan Paul Trench Trübner 1894.
- Pellegrini, Marco. (2015). "PIO II, papa," (in Italian), in: Dizionario Biografico degli Italiani Volume 83 (2015).
- Andrić, Stanko (2016). "Saint John Capistran and Despot George Branković: An Impossible Compromise". Byzantinoslavica. 74 (1–2): 202–227.

=== Works of Aeneas Sylvius ===
- Morrall, Eric J. (1988). Aeneas Silvius Piccolomini (Pius II) and Niklas von Wyle. The Tale of Two Lovers: Eurialus and Lucretia Amsterdam: Rodopi, 1988.
- Pius II, Commentarii rerum memorabilium (1584) at Google Books (first edition).
- Pius II. Pius II. Pont. Max. a calumniis vindicatus ternis retractationibus eius quibus dicta et scripta pro concilio Basileensi contra Eugenium PP. IV. eiuravit. ed. Carolus Fea. Romae: Franciscus Bourlié 1823.
- Pius II. Aeneas Sylvius Piccolomineus, qui postea Pius II. P. M., De viris illustribus. (in Latin). Stuttgart: Sumtibus Societatis literariæ stuttgardiensis, 1842.
- Pius II, Pii Pont. Max. Decadum Blondi epitome, qua omnis ab inclinato Romanorum imperio historia, quae coepit fere anno Christi quadringentesimoseptimo, per mille & amplius annos, miro compendio, citra obscuritatem tamen, complectitur. (in Latin) Basel: Apud Ioannem Bebelium, 1533.
- Pius II. Epistolae in pontificatu editae. (in Latin). Mediolani: Antonius Zarotus, 1473.
- Pius II. Epistulae in cardinalatu editae. (in Latin). Romae: Johann Schurener, 1475.
- Pius II, Aeneae Syluij Piccolominei Senensis, qui post adeptum pontificatum Pius eius nominis secundus appellatus est, Opera quae extant omnia, nunc demum post corruptissimas editiones summa diligentia castigata & in unum corpus redacta, quorum elenchum uersa pagella indicabit: his quoque accessit gnomologia ex omnibus Syluij operibus collecta. Basel: Per Henrichum Petri, 1551.
- Pius II. Aeneae Sylvii De Picolominibus episcopi Tergestini De rebus Basileae gestis stante vel dissoluto concilio commentarius primitus e bibliotheca Vaticana in lucem editus praeposito proemio, subjectis adnotationibus cura Michaelis Catalani canonici Ecclesiae Firmanae. (in Latin). Fermo: apud Jos. Alexandrum Paccasassium, 1803.
- Heck, A. van (1994). Eneae Silviae Piccolominei "Carmina". (Città del Vaticano 1994). [Studi e testi, 364].
- Tomassetti, Luigi, ed. (1860). Bullarum, diplomatum et privilegiorum sanctorum romanorum pontificum taurinensis (in Latin). Vol. 5 (Tomus V). Turin: Seb. Franco et Henrico Dalmazzo editoribus. pp. 145–182. [bulls of Pius II]
- Wolkan, Rudolf (ed.) (1909). Der Briefwechsel des Eneas Silvius Piccolomini. I. Abteilung: Briefe aus der Laienzeit (1431–1445). I. Band: Privatbriefe. (in German and Latin). [Fontes Rerum Austriacarum, Volume 61] Wien: A. Hölder, 1909.
- Wolkan, Rudolf (ed.) (1909b). Der Briefwechsel des Eneas Silvius Piccolomini. I. Abteilung: Briefe aus der Laienzeit (1431–1445). II. Band: Amtliche Briefe. (in German and Latin). [Fontes Rerum Austriacarum, Volume 62] Wien: A. Hölder, 1909.
- Collected Orations of Enea Silvio Piccolomini. Edited and translated by Michael von Cotta-Schönberg. 12 vols. 2019-2025. (Freely available in HAL Archives).

=== For further reading ===
- Coulombe. Charles A., Vicars of Christ: A History of the Popes, Citadel Press, 2003, ISBN 0-8065-2370-0
- Creighton, Mandell (1902). Historical Essays and Reviews. London: Longmans, Green, and Company, 1902. "Aeneas Silvius," pp. 55–106.
- Earle, Thomas Foster; Lowe K.J.P (editors) (2005). Black Africans in Renaissance Europe. Cambridge University Press, 2005 ISBN 0-521-81582-7.
- Gregorovius, Ferdinand (1900). History of the City of Rome in the Middle Ages. Volume 7, Part 1 London: G. Bell, 1900. pp. 160–217. [critical of Pius II]
- Meserve, Margaret; Marcello Simonetta (2007) [2003]. Pius II: Commentaries. The I Tatti Renaissance Library. ISBN 978-0-674-01164-9. 3 vols.
- Norwich, John Julius, Absolute Monarchs: A History of the Papacy, Random House, 2011, ISBN 978-1-4000-6715-2

Catholic Church titles
| Preceded by Antonio Cerdà i Lloscos | Camerlengo of the Sacred College of Cardinals; 1457 | Succeeded by Giacomo Tebaldi |
| Preceded by Franz Kuhschmalz | Prince-Bishop of Warmia (Ermland); 1457–1458 | Succeeded by Paul von Legendorf |
| Preceded by Callixtus III | Pope; 19 August 1458 – 14 August 1464 | Succeeded by Paul II |
