= 1340s =

Decade

The 1340s was a decade that began on 1 January 1340 and ended on 31 December 1349. It was part of the Late Middle Ages in the Old World and the pre-Columbian era in the New World.

In Asia, the Mongol Empire and its breakaway states were in a state of gradual decline. The Ilkhanate had already fragmented into several political territories and factions struggling to place their puppet leaders over the shell of an old state; the Chagatai Khanate was undermined by religious unrest and fell to rebellion. The Black Plague swept through the Kipchak Khanate in 1346, and also affected the Genoese colonies under Mongol siege, specifically the Crimean port-city of Kaffa (modern Feodosia). The Yuan dynasty in China was struck by a series of disasters, including frequent flooding, widespread banditry, fires in urban areas, declining grain harvest, increased civil unrest and local rebellion – the seeds of resistance that would lead to its downfall. Southeast Asia remained free from Mongol power; two major regional powers, the Tran dynasty and Majapahit thrived in the 1340s, after each defeated Mongol attacks in the 1280s and 1290s respectively.

In Europe, the decade continued the period of gradual economic decline, often mistitled the "depression" of the 1340s. This followed the end of the Medieval Warm Period and the start of the Little Ice Age in the 14th century, and affected most of Western Europe, with the exception of a few Italian city-states. The state increasingly interfered in the socio-economic status of its commoners in the decade. Europe entered a period which saw almost continuous war for the next century. The Hundred Years' War (1337–1453) between France and England continued, and Edward III of England led an invasion resulting in notable victories at the Battles of Sluys and Crécy in 1340 and 1346 respectively. The medieval crusading spirit continued in Spain, with a Castilian victory at the Battle of Río Salado and the recommencement of the Reconquista in 1340; and in the Baltic, with Swedish King Magnus Eriksson's Northern Crusades against Novgorod in 1347–1348. In the east, the Byzantine Empire, then under the Palaiologoi, saw the disastrous Byzantine civil war of 1341–1347. Meanwhile, a crisis of confidence in the Florentine banks caused many of them to collapse between 1341 and 1346. The Black Plague which struck Europe in 1348 wiped out a full third of the population by the end of the decade.

In Africa, the two great empires were the Christian Ethiopian Empire in the east and the Muslim Mali Empire in the west. Amda Seyon I, who had brought Ethiopia to its height, was succeeded in 1344 by Newaya Krestos, who continued to foster trade in East Africa. Mansa Suleyman assumed office in the Mali Empire in 1341, and similarly took steep measures to reform Mali's finances. Songhai, which had emerged in this decade, was conquered by Mali for the time being. In the Americas, cities of the Mississippian culture such as Cahokia, Kincaid and Moundville went into an accelerated state of decline in this decade. Factors such as depletion of resources, climatic change, war, disease, social unrest and declining political and economic power have been suggested, although the sites were not fully abandoned until the 15th century. Central America saw the decayed Maya civilization ruled from their capital Mayapan in the Yucatán Peninsula, while the Mexicas from their capital city of Tenochtitlan were on the rise.

== Political leaders ==
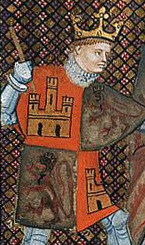
(Castile and León) Alfonso XI of Castile

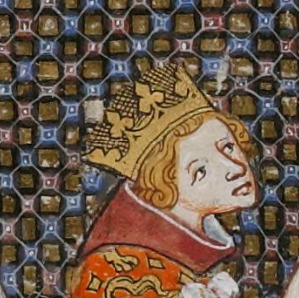
(Kingdom of England) Edward III of England

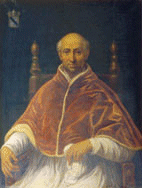
(Papal States) Pope Clement VI

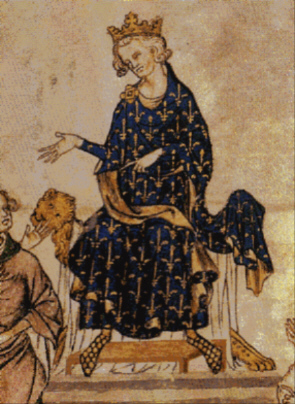
(Kingdom of France) Philip VI of France

== Asia ==
=== Political developments ===
==== Mongol decline ====
The political configuration of Asia in the mid-1340s

In the Kipchak Khanate, Özbeg Khan of the Golden Horde died in 1341, ending what Muslim chroniclers considered a golden age. His elder son Tinibeg ruled for a year or two, before being dethroned and killed at the hands of his younger brother Janibeg in 1342. Janibeg's fifteen-year reign was notable for the appearance and rapid transmission of the Black Plague along the trade routes from inner Asia in this decade. The nation "struggled into new life" after the plague had passed in the following decade.

The Chagatai Khanate was being split by religious dissensions between the traditionalist Mongol adherents of the Yasa and the Mongol and Turkish converts to Islam. The eastern half of Chagatai seceded under the conservative Mongol element when Tughluk Temür seized power in Moghulistan around 1345. The Khanate continued in Transoxiana, but the Chatagai khans became the puppets of the now enthusiastically Muslim Turkish amirs, and the amir Qazaghan overthrew the Khan Qazan in 1347.

In the Persian Ilkhanate, the Mongol House of Hülegü had been extinguished in the male line with the death of Il-Khan Abu Sa'id in 1335, . As JJ Saunders wrote, "A crowd of competitors for the vacant throne started up, but of some history has scarcely condescended to record their names, much less their actions, and an interval of more than thirty years was filled with confused political struggles". Numerous claimants were set up in the 1330s; by 1339, the two rivals were Jahan Temür set up by Shaik Hasan-i Buzurg, and Suleiman Khan supported by Shaik Hasan-i Kuchak. In June 1340, the two Hasans and their rival khans met in battle on the Jaghatu; "Hasan-i Buzurg was defeated and fled to Baghdad, where he deposed Jahan-Temür and himself assumed sovereignty as the founder of the Jalayir dynasty". The deposition of Jahan-Temür can be regarded as the final dissolution of the Ilkhanate. Although his rival retained nominal power among the Chobanids for another year or two, he in turn was deposed by Hasan-i Kuchak's brother and similarly disappears into obscurity. "So insignificant had these figureheads become", according to JA Boyle, "that we are not even informed as to the time and manner of their death". Suleiman was replaced as puppet by Anushirvan, "in whose name his Chobanid masters continued to strike coin until 1353".

==== China ====
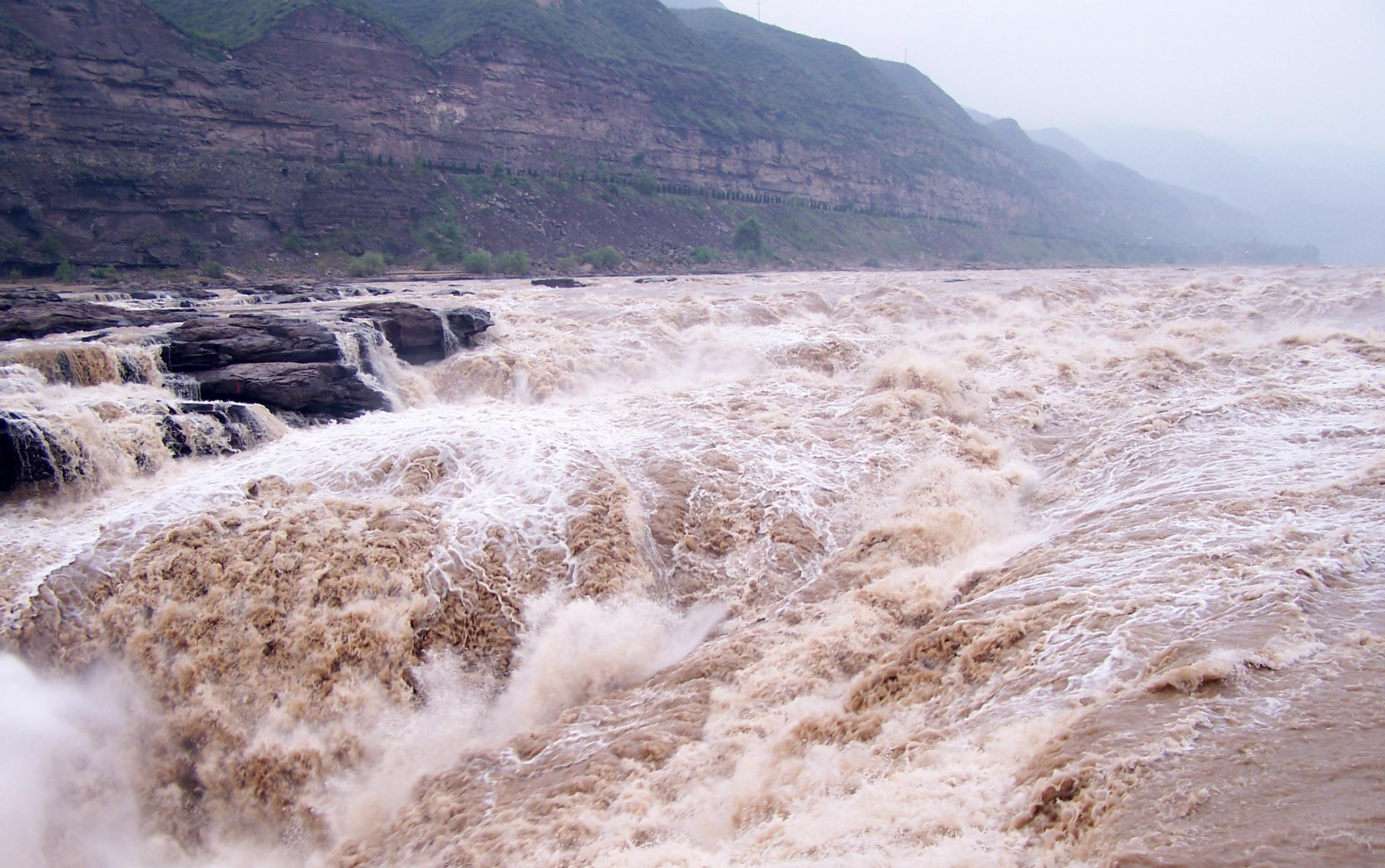
Flooding of the Yellow River posed a serious problem for the Yuan administration, effecting a recentralisation and regulation of power by the end of the decade

In China, the Mongol Yuan dynasty was in a gradual state of decline, due to complex and longstanding problems such as the "endemic tensions among its ruling elites". Toghon Temür had been installed as emperor at age thirteen in 1333, and was to reign as the last Yuan emperor until 1368. In March 1340, the Yuan chancellor, Bayan of the Merkid, was removed in a carefully orchestrated coup, and replaced by his nephew Toqto'a. In Bayan's overthrow by the younger generation, the movement to restore the status quo from reign of Kublai Khan effectively died. Bayan's purges were called off; his supporters dismissed; positions he had closed to the Chinese were reopened; the meritocratic system of examinations for official service was restored. By this time, Temür had just begun to participate in the formal functions of state, and assisted in the "anti-Bayan coup": he issued a posthumous denunciation of his uncle Tugh Temür; he exiled the grand empress dowager Budashiri and his cousin El Tegüs; and entrusted the upbringing of his infant son Ayushiridara to Toghto's household.

Toghto's first term exhibited a fresh new spirit which took a predominantly centralist approach to political solutions. He directed an unsuccessful project to connect the imperial capital to the sea and the Shanxi foothills by water; he was more successful in his attempt to organise funds for the completion of the official histories of the Liao, Qin and Song dynasties. In June 1344, however, he tendered his resignation following a series of local rebellions that had broken out against the Yuan in scattered areas of China.

Toghto's replacement as chancellor was Berke Bukha, an effective provincial administrator who took the opposite, decentralised approach to Toghto. Bukha had learned firsthand from the great Hangzhou fire of 1341 that central regulations had to be violated to provide immediate and effective relief. Accordingly, he promoted able men to local positions and gave them discretionary authority to handle relief and other problems. Similarly, he granted local military garrisons blanket authorisation to prevent the spread of banditry. In 1345, Bukha's administration sent out twelve investigation teams to visit each part of China, correct abuses, and "create benefits and remove harms" for the people.

Bukha's approach failed to arrest the mounting troubles of Yuan China in the 1340s, however. The central government was faced with chronic revenue shortfalls. Maritime grain shipments — vital for the inhabitants of the imperial capital — had seriously declined from a peak of 3.34 million bushels in 1329 to 2.6 million in 1342. From 1348 on, they continued only when permitted by a major piratical operation led by Fang Kuo-chen and his brothers, which the authorities were unable to suppress. Additionally, the Yellow River was repeatedly swelled by long rains, breaching its dykes and flooding the surrounding areas. When the river finally began shifting its course, it caused "widespread havoc and ruin". In 1349, the emperor recalled Toghto to office for a second term. With high enthusiasm and strong belief from his partisans that the problems were soluble, he began a radical process of recentralisation and heavy restriction of regional and local initiative in the following decade.

==== India ====
The 1340s saw the founding of the Bahmani Kingdom in central India. Wars between the Muslims of the north and the southern Hindus of the Vijayanagara Empire occurred in this period. In 1341, the Sultan of Delhi chose Ibn Battuta to lead a diplomatic mission to China.

=== Culture, religion and philosophy ===
Pope Benedict XII had despatched the Italian Franciscan John of Marignolli in 1339, who travelled safely through the Yuan territories of Kipchak and Chagatai Khanate during the Pax Mongolica and reached the imperial capital of Ta-tu in 1342. He was received in an audience with Toghon Temür, to whom he presented some large European horses — their bulk, according to JJ Saunders, "surprised Chinese and Mongols alike, accustomed as they were to the small, wiry animals of the steppes". Marignolli stayed in China for five years, departing by ship in 1347 and returning to Avignon in 1353.

==== Military technology ====
- The poet Zhang Xian wrote the Iron Cannon Affair in 1341, detailing the destructive use of gunpowder and the cannon.

== Europe ==
=== Political developments ===
==== War and decline in Western Europe ====
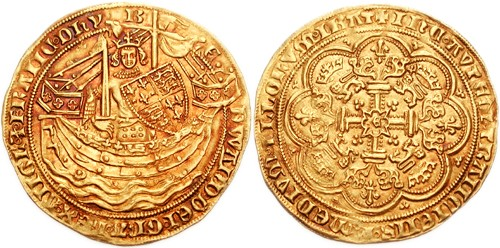
A gold noble of Edward III; his arms show his claim to both France and England

In Europe, the decade continued the period of gradual economic decline, which followed the end of the Medieval Warm Period and the start of the Little Ice Age in the 1300s. This secular decline, often mistitled a "depression", affected most of Western Europe, with the exception of a few Italian city-states. It was the result of factors which had begun earlier in the century, the main cause being the breaking of the balance between Church and state. The more dominant state increasingly interfered in the social and economic life of late medieval Europe, imposing detrimental taxation and regulation. King Edward III of England faced a brief standoff with some dissident barons in 1341 — one of only two such isolated standoffs in his popular reign. Meanwhile, the role of the Parliament of England became more defined, with the House of Commons regularly petitioning Edward from about 1343 onward.

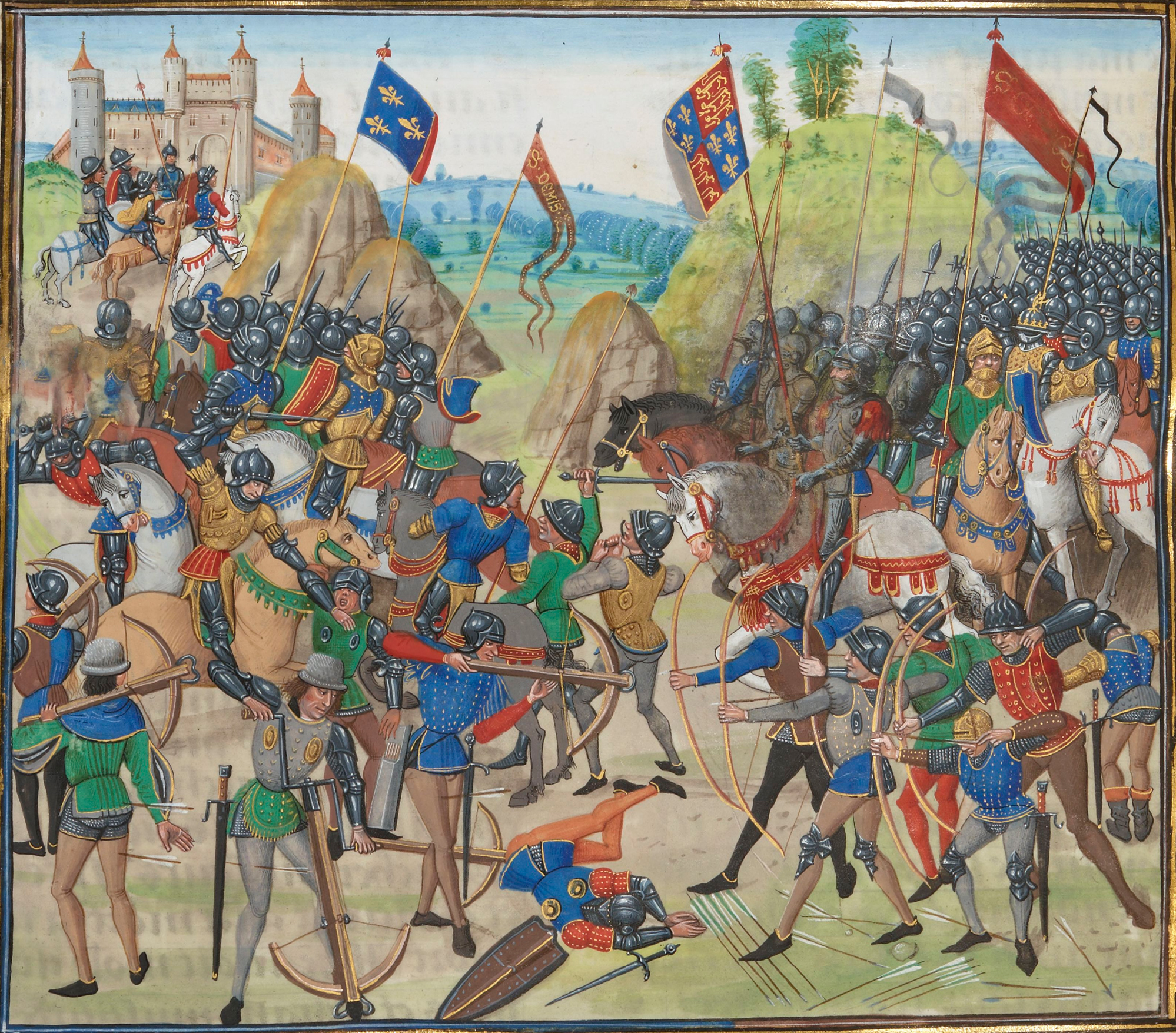
The Battle of Crecy in 1346 was the first great land battle of the Hundred Years' War. In the 1340s, Europe entered a century of virtually continuous war.

Europe entered a period which saw almost continuous war for the next century. Fighting took place in the Duchy of Brittany, "a country well suited to guerilla warfare", from 1342 to 1365 in the Breton War of Succession. The Hundred Years' War (1337–1453) between France and England continued, and Edward III led an invasion resulting in a number of victories. One of the earlier English victories was at the naval Battle of Sluys in 1340, which annihilated the French fleet and gave the English control of the English Channel for several years. The initial campaigns were frustrating and expensive, so Edward altered his strategy to use English armies that were lightly supported but prepared to forage off the land. It successfully established English control over Brittany in 1342. Further armies were sent to Brittany and Gascony in 1345, and Edward himself crossed the Channel in 1346 with 10,000 men — an enormous army by contemporary standards. They plundered Caen, an important town in Normandy, and eventually began moving back toward the Channel.

In 1346, the Battle of Crecy became the first great land battle of the Hundred Years' War, and the most stunning victory of Edward's career. English longbowmen crippled the French knights for many years to come, allowing Edward to take the key Channel port of Calais in 1347. Meanwhile, public discontent caused the town of Lyon to riot in 1347. Importantly, the English campaign of the 1340s "brought the hegemony of high medieval France to a decisive close."

==== Central Europe ====
In the Holy Roman Empire, Ludwig the Bavarian was in conflict with the Avignon Papacy. Pope Clement VI influenced the German Prince-electors to elect Charles of Moravia as rival king to Ludwig. He was crowned in 1346 in Bonn. After the death of Emperor Ludwig in September 1347, Charles IV was recognised as King of Germany by all of the German princes.

In 1341, Margarete Maultasch, Countess of County of Tyrol, had expelled her husband John Henry of Bohemia. She then married Louis of Bavaria, a son of Ludwig, without an annulment of her previous marriage. The result was the excommunication of the couple.

==== Northern Europe ====
Danish Estonia was sold to the Teutonic Order after the rebellion of 1343–1346.

In 1340, a German law-code was drawn up by the Teutonic Knights for their long-settled Prussian district of Pomesania. The code defined two categories of people: the unfree, who came under peasant law (Gebauersrecht) and were consigned to the jurisdiction of their lords; and the freedmen. The latter group included peasants who had the right to demand trial by the written code and could not be sentenced to death in private courts. However, an appendix to the law-code also made it clear that the Old Prussian peasant converts were discriminated against by the Teutonic Knights, and were allowed remain "semi-pagan, uncouth and lawless". Such treatment shocked contemporary commentators such as Saint Bridget of Sweden.

The Danish monarchy had disintegrated in the 1330s, but was restored in 1340 by Valdemar IV after a long interregnum. In the Danish crusader state of Estonia, some 80% of the indigenous population was subject to immigrant lords, to whom they owed tithe and military duty. When the lords reacted to falling grain-prices by increasing the level of tithe, which led to the St. George's Night Uprising in 1343. On 23 April, the Estonians rose up and killed their masters — German sources give a figure of 18,000 dead as a result of the uprising, although this total is unlikely. The Danish government in Estonia was overthrown when a major group of vassals in Tallinn handed over castles to the Teutonic Order in 1344–1345. Beset by pressing problems at home and unable to break the monopoly of the Hanseatic League at sea, Valdemar decided to sell the territory to the master of the Teutonic Order for 10,000 marks. The final sale was approved by the king's Danish counsellors, and the shift of sovereignty took place on 1 November 1346.

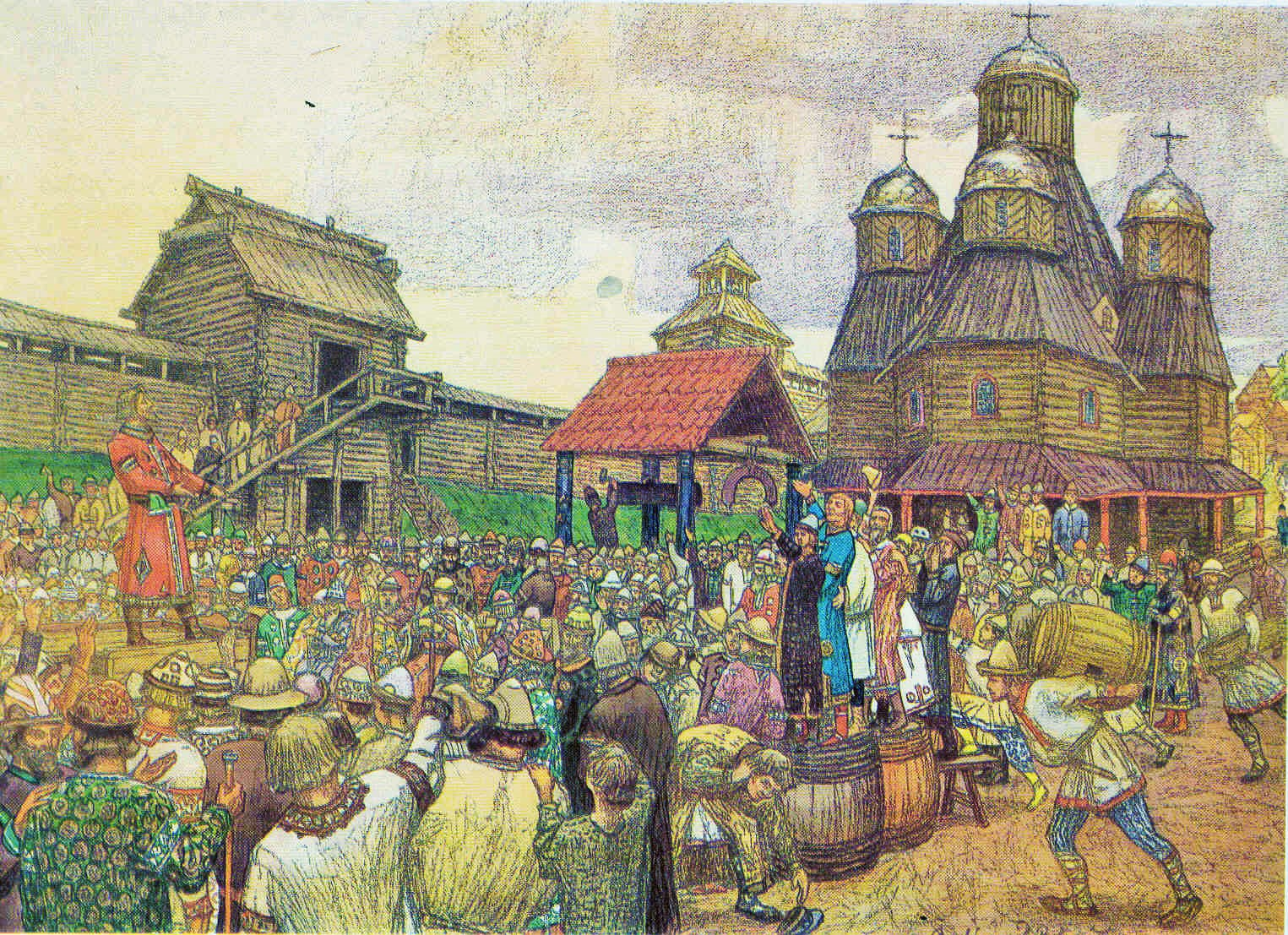
A "veche" or popular assembly of the Pskov Republic, which officially became independent by the Treaty of Bolotovo in 1348

In Sweden, the court was continually reminded of its religious duties by Bridget of Sweden, who was the king's cousin and beginning to win fame as a prophetess. Her primary aim was to reform and purify the upper class, and her posthumously complied Revelations contain thoughts on the Northern Crusades which must have been expressed in the 1344–1348 period. After King Magnus Eriksson had tried and failed to take possession of Denmark in the early 1340s, she advised him not to offend his people by raising taxes to fund wars against their co-religionists, but instead to raise taxes only for self-defence or in crusading against unbelievers. Therefore, after Magnus had at least temporarily resolved difficulties at home, he prepared for a crusade against the Russian Orthodox Novgorod. Envoys were sent to the Russians in 1347, and an army was assembled that included Danish and German auxiliaries, and the support of Henry of Rendsburg. The army set sail for the campaign in 1348.

Accordingly, there were political divisions in the Russian states in this decade. The southern territories of Novgorod had been subjugated by Prince Algirdas of Lithuania in 1346, and Simeon of Moscow had failed to intervene. The city was divided between competing boyar factions, and the lack of unity between Novgorod and her allies allowed for the success of Magnus' campaign of 1348. Pskov officially broke away from Novgorod that year; and Simeon was again delayed in helping against the Swedes, this time by business with his overlord, the Khan of the Golden Horde. Orekhov was taken by the Swedes, although it was to fall in 1349.

==== Eastern Europe ====
- Byzantine civil war of 1341–1347 within the Byzantine Empire
- John III Comnenus becomes emperor of Trebizond (1342)
- Guy de Lusignan becomes King Gosdantin II of Armenia (1342)
- The Patriarchate of Antioch is transferred to Damascus under Ignatius II (1342)
- Serbian expansion
- In 1342, Louis I became King of Hungary.

==== Southern Europe ====
In Rome, the general despair brought on by the Plague and the absence of the Pope have been cited as possible causes for the rise of the Roman notary Cola di Rienzo: in 1347, he assumed the title of censor and claimed to restore the Roman Republic. He utilised popular rhetoric, and invited the men of Trastevere to sack the palaces of the fleeing Roman nobility. Cola tried to establish direct government with elections in the rione of the city, but he lacked the means to take the Castel Sant'Angelo and he was cut down by the Roman aristocracy in 1354.

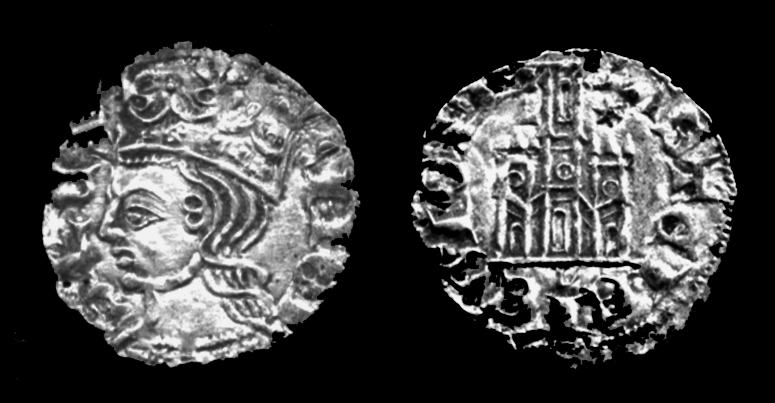
A billon coin of Alfonso XI of Castile, dated circa 1345.

There were several rulers of the Kingdoms of Spain in the 1340s. Alfonso XI the Just ruled until the end of the decade as King of Castile and León. Castile and León surrounded Granada by land, and Alfonso advanced the Christian Reconquista. In 1340, at the Battle of Río Salado, he won the first Castilian victory over the Moors for over a century, and crossed the straits to Algeciras. In 1345, he attacked Gibraltar, but was unable to conquer it.

By 1343, Aragon had acquired the Balearic Islands, and in 1344 Peter deposed James III of Majorca to become King of Majorca himself. Navarre was ruled by Philip III until 1343, his Capetian wife Joanna II until 1349, and finally Charles II the Bad ruled into the late 14th century. The Kingdom of Portugal was meanwhile ruled by Afonso IV, from 1325 until his death in 1357.

In 1341, Saluzzo sacked by Manfred V of Saluzzo. In 1342, Louis "the Child" became King of Sicily and Duke of Athens. An earthquake and tsunami of 1343 devastated the Maritime Republic of Amalfi.

=== Society and economy ===
==== Economic collapse and crisis ====
To finance the continuing wars of the 1340s, Edward III of England granted to a small group of merchants a monopoly on the export of wool. In return, they agreed to collect the "poundage", or wool tax, on his behalf. This included a tariff on the import of woolen cloth, which put out of business the Italian and foreign merchants that had dominated the wool export trade. The monopoly merchants went bankrupt in the following decade.

Edward also introduced three new gold coins in 1344: the florin, leopard, and helm. However, the gold content of these coins did not match their respective value of 6 shillings, 3 shillings, and 1 shilling and sixpence, so they had to be withdrawn and mostly melted down by August of that year.

In France, the king's personal expenditure on dowries, gratuities, the upkeep of the palace, his travels and his wardrobe, consumed the entirety of the royal income. Therefore, a monopoly on salt, an essential commodity, was established in 1341; monopolies in salt had already been established in Kingdom of Castile and Venice in the 1330s. The French salt tax or gabelle itself never amounted to more than 2%. Fouages were also levied in 1342 and 1349.

The Italian city states were booming at the start of the decade. In 1340, Francesco Balducci Pegolotti wrote his Practica della mercatura. Meanwhile, rulers such as the Neapolitan princes had begun withdrawing massive funds from Florentine banks. England found itself unable to repay its debts, and both factors resulted in a crisis of confidence in the Florentine banks The family-based banks and mercantile associations of Florence and Genoa generally kept only 25–30% of their capital in liquid assets, and between 1341 and 1346, many of the most important of the Florentine banks collapsed. — an "avalanche of bankruptcies", in the words of Robert Fossier. These were owned by the following banking families: the Acciaiuolis, the Bonaccorsis, the Cocchis, the Antellesis, the Corsinis, the Uzzanos, the Perendolis, the Peruzzis and the Bardis.

==== Social unrest ====
The situation in the towns remained delicate: while on one hand the trades were dominant, and Villani counted no fewer than 200 textile workshops in Florence around 1340, working conditions and entry restrictions imposed by the guilds created tensions with the unemployed and unskilled labourers. Strikes or grèves occurred in Ghent in 1337–1345 and in Florence in 1346. In 1349–1350, the fullers and weavers of Ghent and Liège massacred each other. The failures in the food supply in the regions of Provence and Lyon, in 1340 and 1348 respectively, affected contemporaries particularly harshly. This was not just because these generations were unused to them, but because they were accompanied by war and followed by epidemic in this decade.

==== The Black Plague ====
Spread of plague in the 1340s: 1347 mid-1348 early-1349 late-1349 Areas that escaped with minor plague outbreak

In 1340, the total population of Europe was 54 million; by 1450, it would be 37 million, a 31% drop in only a century. In addition to the earlier social and economic decline, the Black Plague is identified as the superficial cause, which struck Europe and wiped out a full third of the population in short space of 1348–1350. It has been described as "a pandemic of plagues such as the world had not seen since the sixth century and was not destined to see again till the 1890s." It was actually three related diseases: bubonic plague and septicaemic plague, carried by fleas hosted by the black rat, and pneumonic plague, the especially fast and lethal airborne variant. The few areas that escaped included Poland, Hungary, Rouergue in France, Liège in Belgium, and the county of Béarn in the Pyrenees. It has been suggested that these areas were spared due to the predominance of O-Blood type, which had only recently taken root in the heartlands of Europe, although this hypothesis has yet to be proven.

The pandemic, which began in central Asia, was first reported in Europe in the summer of 1346. The Genoese colony of Caffa in the Crimea was besieged by the Tartars, who catapulted plague-ridden corpses into the city. The defenders carried the disease back to Italy; in October 1347 it reached Messina in Sicily, in December a ship carried the plague into Marseille, and by January 1348 it was in Genoa. The plague then moved northward through France. According to the French monk Guillaume de Nangis:

Victims were only ill for two or three days and died suddenly, their bodies almost sound... They had swellings in the armpits and groin, and the appearance of these swellings was an unmistakable sign of death... Soon, in many places, of every twenty inhabitants only two remained alive. The mortality was so great at the hospital of Paris that for a long time more than 500 bodies were carried off on wagons each day, to be buried at the cemetery of the Holy Innocents.

The reasons for the plague's success are not yet entirely understood. Urban overcrowding, declining sanitary conditions and the "lively European trade in (rat-infested) grain" have been cited as causes of the plague's rapid transmission; while favourable climatic conditions and the summer months may also have aided its spread. In the summer of 1348 it reached England, arriving first at Melcombe Regis in Dorset. It had spread through the southwestern shires to London by winter. It peaked in the summer of 1349, when it was passed on into Germany and Austria, and in winter it was in Scotland, Scandinavia and Spain.

In general, towns were hit more severely than rural areas, the poor more than the rich, and the young and fit more than the old and infirm. Norman Davies generalises that "No pope, no kings were stricken." Hundreds died in each parish, although some figures may have been exaggerated. Norwich, a city that did not exceed 17,000, was reported as having lost 57,000. The Italian humanist Giovanni Boccaccio records a loss of 100,000 in Florence, exceeding the total population of the city. The figure was probably closer to 50,000. Regardless, modern studies make it clear that the plague's toll in this decade was heavy.

Heaviest hit were the clergy, who were brought into direct contact with plague victims. Guillaume de Nangis records that "some monks and friars, being braver, administered the sacraments", and that the sisters at the hospital of Paris, "fearless of death, carried out their task to the end with the most perfect gentleness and humility. These sisters were all wiped out by death..." In the dioceses of York and Lincoln, about 44% of the clergy perished, while nearly 50% died in the Exeter, Winchester, Norwich and Ely. In all, half of the English clergy may have died.

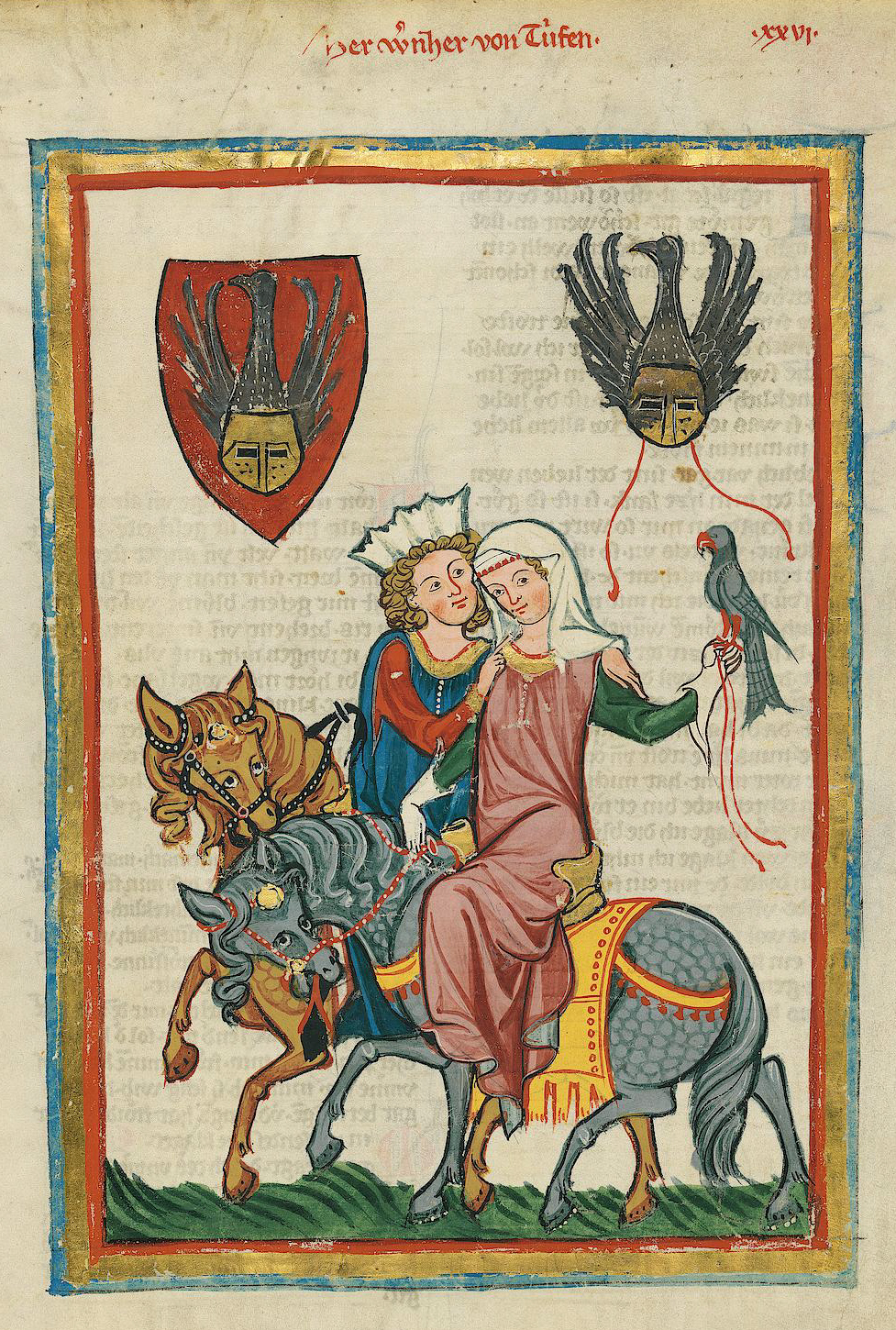
An illustration of fashion among nobles hawking, from the Codex Manesse, completed c. 1340.

In 14th century England, the Black Plague "served as a somber backdrop to a deepening economic crisis... and growing social tensions and religious restlessness." Villages were deserted, herds were untended, wool and grain markets were crippled and land values plummeted. The plague would strike periodically in subsequent decades. However, it is also suggested that in Europe in general, the Black Plague solved the economic recession, in that the reduction in population returned the supply of cash credit and money per capita to its pre-crisis level, laying the foundation for recovery. Wages rose, and the peasantry benefited from a more open, fluid society.^{[Note 1]} At the end of the decade, the economic effects of the Black Plague "may well have been more purgative than toxic".

=== Culture, religion and philosophy ===
==== Architecture ====
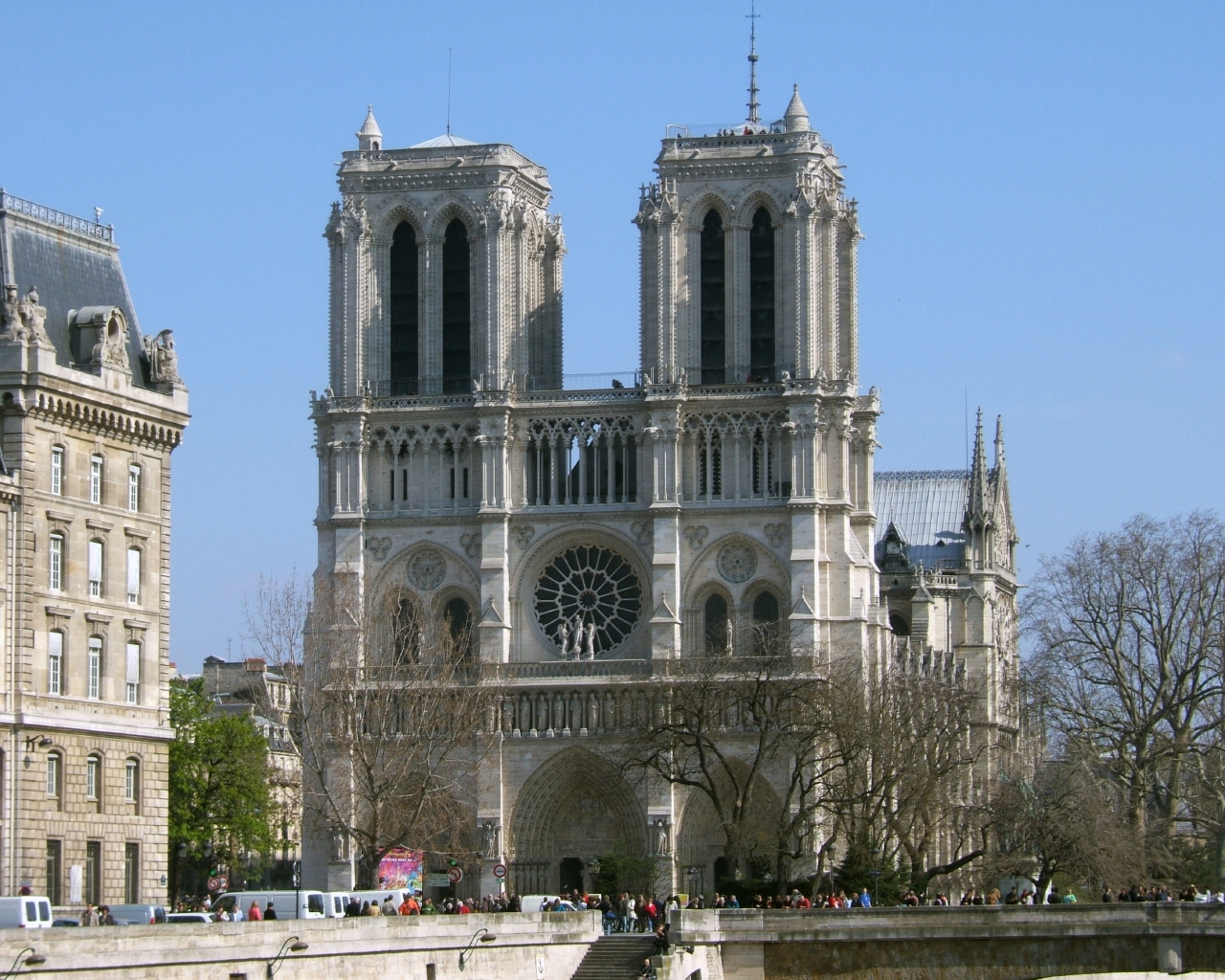
The western façade of Notre Dame de Paris, completed in 1345

A number of European building projects were completed in the 1340s, mainly consisting of cathedrals and universities. In 's-Hertogenbosch, construction was finished on the Romanesque church begun in 1220, which was later rebuilt as the 16th century St. John's Cathedral. In the German city of Mainz, work was completed on the Collegiate Church of St. Stephan, begun in 1267. In Naples, three decades of work were finished on the monastery of Santa Chiara.

The High Gothic choir of St. Stephen's Cathedral, Vienna, was consecrated in 1340. Mecheln Cathedral, then a collegiate church, was started with the choir in 1342. In 1344, Prague was made an archbishopric, and the foundation stone was laid on the new St. Vitus Cathedral. Cathedrals completed in this decade, excluding later alterations, include Notre Dame de Paris and the Cathedral of the Theotokos, Vilnius, completed around 1345 and 1346 respectively. In Ely Cathedral, the last part of the repairs to the structure was finished with the richly decorated Lady Chapel in 1345.

In Venice, the Venetian Gothic Palazzo Ducale, or Doge's Palace, was erected on top of older buildings in 1340. In Switzerland, the walls of the Old City of Berne were extended up to the Christoffelturm, from 1344 to 1346. Berne's Käfigturm was erected from 1256 to 1344 as the second western city gate. In Siena, the Torre della Mangia of the Palazzo Pubblico was completed in 1348. That same year, land in the English town of Charing held by the Archbishop of Canterbury was redeveloped as an episcopal palace.

The Scuola della Carità, one of the six Scuole Grandi of Venice, was built in 1343. Two medieval universities were established in the 1340s: the University of Pisa (1343) and the University of Prague (1347). The University of Valladolid was also granted a licentia ubique docendi by Pope Clement VI in 1347, during the reign of Alfonso XI. Queen's College, Oxford, was founded by the chaplain Robert de Eglesfield in 1341, and Queen Philippa secured the lands of a small hospital in Southampton for the college in 1343. Meanwhile, Bablake School was founded in Coventry in 1344 by the Queen Mother, Isabella of France, while Pembroke College, Cambridge, was completed in 1347.

==== Art ====
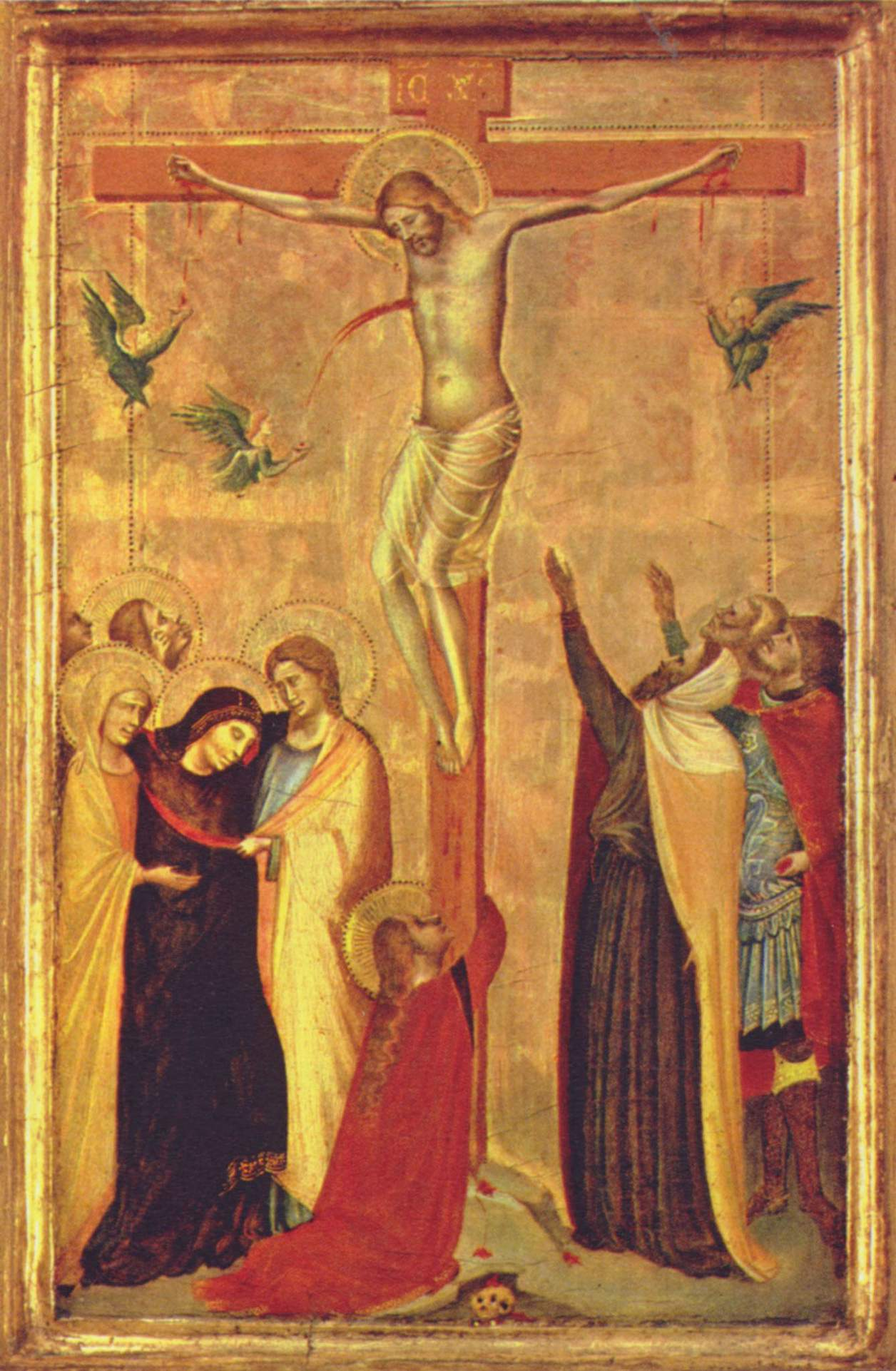
Bernardo Daddi's Crucifixion (1340–1345)

In religious art, a series of stained glass windows were completed for the choir clerestory of Évreux Cathedral in Normandy c. 1340. Stained glass was also completed for the former Königsfelden Abbey in Switzerland, around the same time.

The possibilities of Giotto's art were developed further in this decade by his pupils Maso di Banco and Bernardo Daddi. Significant of their works is Pope Sylvester Tames the Dragon, painted in 1340 by di Banco for the Church of Santa Croce in Florence. An illustration by the artist Domenico Lenzi, the City Scene of 1340 from the Il Biadaiolo codex, shows just how much the Florentine artists were influenced by Giotto.

In 1340, toward the end of his life, the painter Simone Martini was called to Avignon to work for the papal court. His frescos in the portico of Avignon Cathedral have been lost, but the frescoes in the papal palace, painted by his pupils or colleagues around 1340, survive. Another notable religious artist was the Pisan painter Francesco Traini, who painted the Triumph of St. Thomas Aquinas as part of an Italian altarpiece "which reflects the divine order of the cosmos".

In sculpture, the main artist was Andrea Pisano, who maintained a workshop in Pisa with his son Nino Pisano from 1343 to 1347. They are noted for the famous sculpture Maria lactans, and their work on Orvieto Cathedral.

==== Literature ====
In 1341, Petrarch was crowned poet laureate in Rome, the first man since antiquity to be given this honor.

- Codex Manesse, completed 1340
- Michael of Northgate (Ayenbite of Inwyt, 1340)
- Giovanni Boccaccio (works)
- Petrarch (Africa, 1343)
- Geoffrey Chaucer (born 1343)
- Perceforest, completed 1344

==== Military technology ====
It was around this decade that medieval cannon began to be used more widely in Europe, appearing in small numbers in several European states by the 1340s. "Thunder jar" weaponry utilizing gunpowder and other firearm technology spread to Spain in 1342 and to the city of Aachen in Northern Germany in 1346. "Ribaldis" were first mentioned in the English Privy Wardrobe accounts between 1345 and 1346, during preparations for the campaign in France. The effectiveness of these cannon was limited, as they are believed to have only shot large arrows and simple grapeshot, but they were so valuable that they were directly controlled by the Royal Wardrobe. Contemporary chroniclers such as the French Jean Froissart and the Florentine Giovanni Villani record their destructiveness on the field at the Battle of Crecy in 1346.

==== Philosophy and religion ====
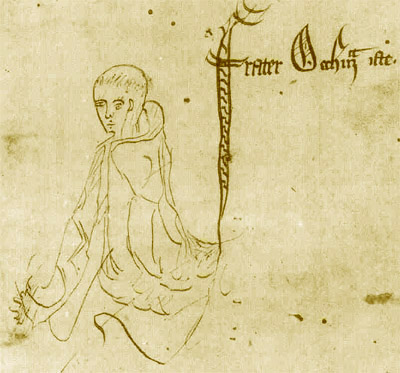
A sketch of William of Ockham, from a 1341 manuscript of Ockham's earlier nominalist work, Summa Logicae

In the 1340s, Catholic Church was governed under the Avignon Papacy. Pope Benedict XII died on 25 April 1342, and was buried in a mausoleum in Avignon Cathedral. Thirteen days later, the cardinals elected Benedictine cardinal and theologian Pierre Roger de Beaufort as Pope Clement VI. He reigned as pope until 1352.

In 1340s, the controversial Franciscan friar and Scholastic philosopher William of Ockham was at Munich under the protection of the Holy Roman Emperor, Louis of Bavaria, since 1330. During this time, he wrote exclusively on political matters, as an advocate of secular absolutism against papal authority, for which he had previously been excommunicated. Among the followers of Ockhamism — condensed as the omnipotence of God and Occam's Razor — were John of Mirecourt (fl. c. 1345) and Nicholas of Autrecourt (fl. c. 1347), both of whom taught at the University of Paris. Ockham, Mirecourt and Autrecourt all agreed on the principle of noncontradiction and experience as bases of certainty.

On November 21, 1340, Autrecourt too was summoned him to Avignon to respond to allegations of false teaching. The trial, under Pope Benedict XII and his successor Clement VI, lasted until his conviction in 1346. Autrecourt was charged with 66 erroneous teachings or "articles", which he publicly recanted before the papal court. He recanted them in public again, in Paris in 1347. Although Ockham also expressed willingness to resubmit to the Church and Franciscan Order, there is no evidence of a formal reconciliation. Ockham is sometimes said to have died in 1349, but it is more likely to have been 1347.

In 1343, Clement VI issued the papal bull Unigenitus. The bull defined the doctrine of "The Treasury of Merits" or "The Treasury of the Church" as the basis for the issuance of indulgences by the Catholic Church.

== Africa ==
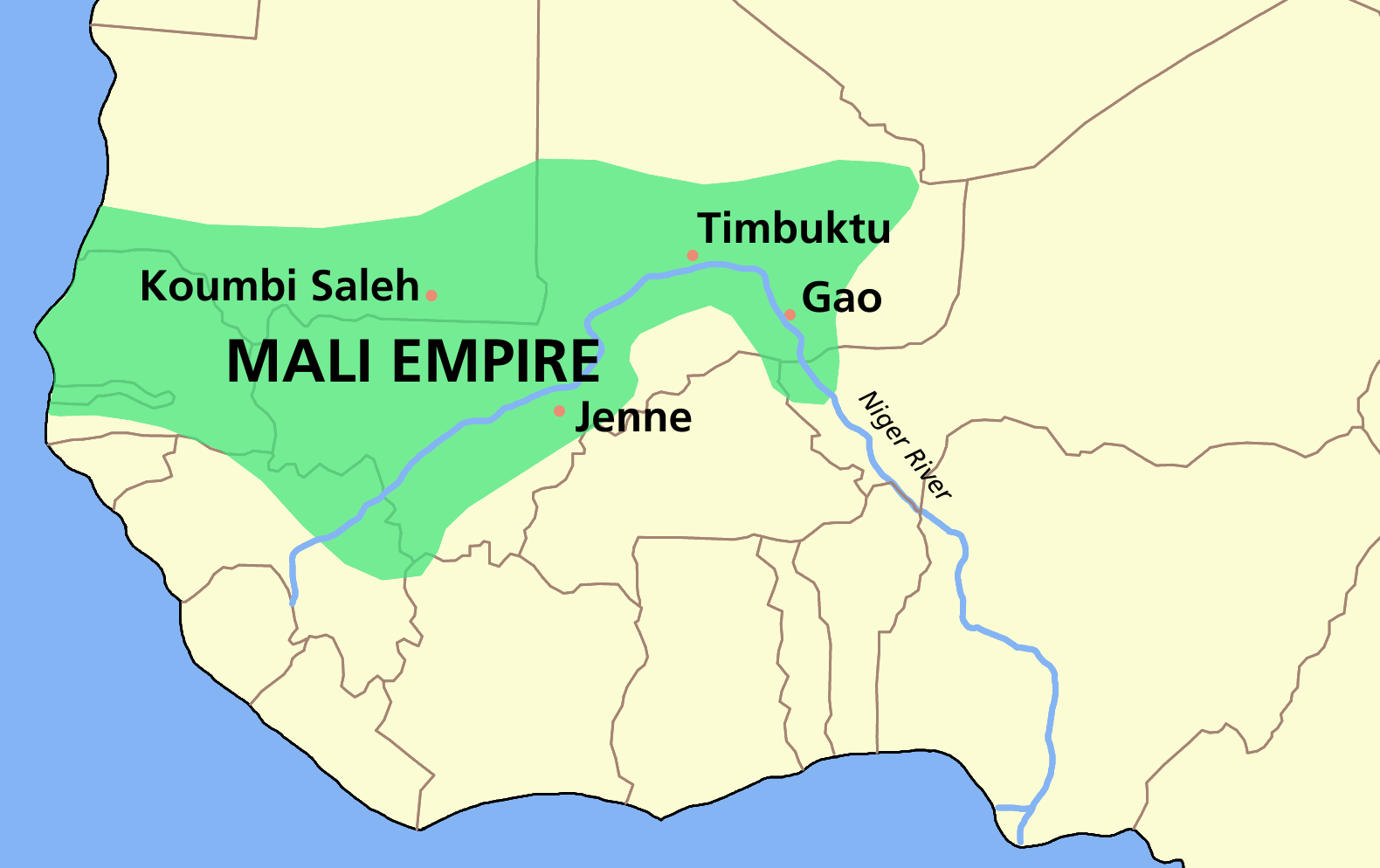
The Mali Empire around the end of the decade

In Egypt, the Mameluk sultans were constantly changing. In 1347, the Blue Mosque was completed in Cairo.

In the Horn of Africa, the 1340s were part of the century and a half (1314–1468) that comprised "the crowning era of medieval Ethiopia", which began with the reign of Amda Seyon I. The crusading spirit of Amda's conquests in the previous decades had established an effective Ethiopian hegemony over his divided Muslim neighbours, but the chief concern of his conquests had been above all to maintain trade for both Muslims and Christians. On Amda's death in 1344, the size of his Christian Empire was double what it had been in 1314. Trade flourished in ivory and other animal products from the western and southwestern border regions, while food products were exported from the highlands to the eastern lowlands and coastal ports. He was succeeded as emperor by his eldest son Newaya Krestos, who followed his father's policies toward the Mulisms in the east, most of whom continued to be tributaries of Ethiopia.

In the Mali Empire of West Africa, Mansa Souleyman, who had assumed office in 1341, took steep measures to put Mali back into financial shape, developing a reputation for miserliness. However, he proved to be a good and strong ruler despite numerous challenges. It is during his reign that Fula raids on Takrur began. There was also a palace conspiracy to overthrow him hatched by the Qasa (Manding term meaning Queen) and several army commanders. Mansa Souleyman's generals successfully fought off the military incursions, and the senior wife behind the plot was imprisoned. Mali was at this time the dominant empire of West Africa, having conquered Songhai Empire. The Songhai Empire would not regain independence for another three decades.

== Americas ==
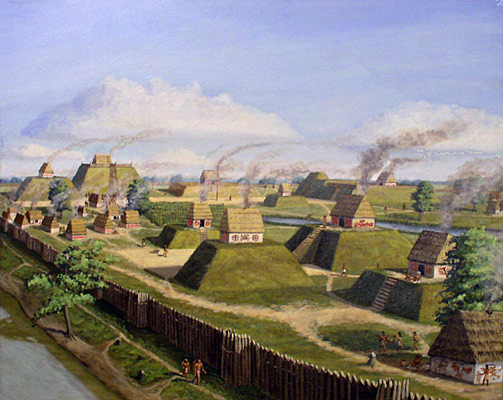
The decline of the Mississippian culture accelerated from the 1340s on.

Very little is known of the Americas in this period, save what can be determined from archaeology. In North America, the Mississippian culture was in a continued state of decline. The city of Cahokia had experienced gradual decline since the 1200s, possibly due to contributory factors such as depletion of resources, climatic change, war, disease, social unrest and declining political and economic power. The final abandonment of the city may have taken place some time between this decade and 1400. Radiocarbon dating of wash material from Mound 55 give a date of around 1350, which can be taken as the time the mound was last used.

Other Mississippian sites which went into decline after this decade, from about 1350 on, include the Kincaid Mounds and the Moundville site. In the case of the latter, the decline was marked by a loss of the appearance of a town and a decrease in the importation of goods. Although the site retained its ceremonial and political functions, some of the mounds were abandoned while others lost their religious importance altogether.

In Central America, the Mayans, who centuries earlier had suffered a serious decline, were ruled from a capital in the Yucatan Peninsula called Mayapan. Other pre-Columbian civilisations, however, were on the rise. The precursors to the Aztecs, the Mexicas, had recently founded their capital city of Tenochtitlan. They also had occasional skirmishes with the nearby Mixtec civilization.

== Notes ==
1. According to Fossier (p 89), a number of yeomen had benefited by the disappearance of many of their neighbours, as they were able to take over their empty farmlands and were then in a position to pay the going wages. However, while Hollister (p 285) and Soto (p 71) argue for the plague's positive socio-economic effects, Fossier (p 89) further suggests these were offset by state intervention in the form of royal taxation and wage restrictions. Edward III's issuance of the Ordinance of Labourers in 1349 limited the steep rise in wages that resulted from the plague, and the yeomen who had previously benefited now found themselves "deprived by royal ordinance of their essential workforce". The enforcement of such wage restrictions in 1351–1359 was to provoke serious unrest in Cheshire and Oxfordshire in that decade, while increased taxation in France caused similar discontent culminating in the Jacquerie (Fossier, p 89–90).

== Bibliography ==
- Christiansen, Eric (1997). The Northern Crusades. Penguin. ISBN 0140266534.
- Davies, Norman (1996). Europe: A History. Oxford: Oxford University Press. ISBN 0-19-820171-0.
- Delbrück, Hans et al. History of the Art of War. Lincoln: University of Nebraska Press, 1990. ISBN 0803265867
- Frank, Herbert; Twitchett, Denis (2006). The Cambridge History of China. Volume VI: Alien regimes and border states, 907–1368. Cambridge University Press. ISBN 978-0-521-24331-5.
- Fossier, Robert (1986). The Cambridge Illustrated History of the Middle Ages: 1250–1520. Cambridge University Press. ISBN 0521266467.
- Henze, Paul B. (2000). Layers of Time: A History of Ethiopia (Illustrated ed.). C. Hurst & Co. Publishers. ISBN 1850655227.
- Hollister, C. Warren (1992) [1966]. Lacey Baldwin Smith (ed.). The Making of England, 55 BC to 1399 (A History of England). Vol. I (Sixth ed.). Lexington, MA. ISBN 0-669-24457-0.
- Neillands, Robin. The Hundred Years' War. New York: Routledge, 1990. ISBN 0415071496
- Nicolle, David (2000). Crécy 1346: Triumph of the Longbow. Osprey Publishing. ISBN 9781855329669.
- Nossov, Konstantin. Ancient and Medieval Siege Weapons. City: The Lyons Press, 2005. ISBN 1592287107
- Nossov, Konstantin (2007). Medieval Russian Fortresses AD 862–1480. Osprey Publishing. ISBN 9781846030932.
- O'Callaghan, Joseph (2004). Reconquest and Crusade in Medieval Spain. Philadelphia: University of Pennsylvania Press. ISBN 0812218892.
- Rees, Bob and Marika Sherwood. Black Peoples of the Americas. City: Heinemann Educational Secondary Division, 1992. ISBN 0435314254
- Rothbard, Murray N. (2006). Economic thought before Adam Smith: An Austrian Perspective on the History of Economic Thought (PDF). Cheltnam, UK: Edward Elgar. ISBN 094546648X. Archived (PDF) from the original on 2022-10-09.
- Rendina, Claudio (2002). The Popes: Histories and Secrets. Translated by Paul McCusker. Seven Locks Press. ISBN 193164313X.
- Skyum-Nielsen, Niels (1981). Danish Medieval History & Saxo Grammaticus. Museum Tusculanum Press. ISBN 8788073300.
- Smith, Lacey Baldwin (1988) [1966]. Lacey Baldwin Smith (ed.). This Realm of England, 1399 to 1688 (A History of England). Vol. II (Fifth ed.). Lexington, MA. ISBN 0-669-13422-8.
- Saunders, JJ (2001). The History of the Mongol Conquests. Philadelphia: University of Pennsylvania Press. ISBN 0-8122-1766-7.
- Soto, Jesús Huerta de. Money, Bank Credit, and Economic Cycles. (Ludwig von Mises Institute, 2006) Translated by Melinda A. Stroup. ISBN 0945466390
- Stride, G.T & C. Ifeka: "Peoples and Empires of West Africa: West Africa in History 1000–1800". Nelson, 1971
- Taddesse Tamrat, Church and State in Ethiopia (Oxford: Clarendon Press, 1972).
- Toman, Rolf, ed. (2007). The Art of Gothic: Architecture, Sculpture, Painting. photography by Achim Bednorz. Tandem Verlag GmbH. ISBN 978-3-8331-4676-3.
