= 1344 =

1344 in various calendars
Gregorian calendar	1344; MCCCXLIV
Ab urbe condita	2097
Armenian calendar	793; ԹՎ ՉՂԳ
Assyrian calendar	6094
Balinese saka calendar	1265–1266
Bengali calendar	750–751
Berber calendar	2294
English Regnal year	17 Edw. 3 – 18 Edw. 3
Buddhist calendar	1888
Burmese calendar	706
Byzantine calendar	6852–6853
Chinese calendar	癸未年 (Water Goat); 4041 or 3834 — to — 甲申年 (Wood Monkey); 4042 or 3835
Coptic calendar	1060–1061
Discordian calendar	2510
Ethiopian calendar	1336–1337
Hebrew calendar	5104–5105
- Hindu calendars
Vikram Samvat	1400–1401
Shaka Samvat	1265–1266
Kali Yuga	4444–4445
Holocene calendar	11344
Igbo calendar	344–345
Iranian calendar	722–723
Islamic calendar	744–745
Japanese calendar	Kōei 3 (康永３年)
Javanese calendar	1256–1257
Julian calendar	1344; MCCCXLIV
Korean calendar	3677
Minguo calendar	568 before ROC 民前568年
Nanakshahi calendar	−124
Thai solar calendar	1886–1887
Tibetan calendar	阴水羊年 (female Water-Goat); 1470 or 1089 or 317 — to — 阳木猴年 (male Wood-Monkey); 1471 or 1090 or 318

Year 1344 (MCCCXLIV) was a leap year starting on Thursday of the Julian calendar.

== Events ==
=== January–December ===
- March 26 – Reconquista: The Siege of Algeciras (1342–44), one of the first European military engagements where gunpowder is used, ends with the Muslim city of Algeciras surrendering and being incorporated into the Kingdom of Castile.
- April 17 – Constantine II, King of Armenia, is killed in an uprising and succeeded by a distant cousin, Constantine III.
- April 23 – The St. George's Night Uprising: The Livonian Order hangs Vesse, the rebel Estonian Elder of Saaremaa Island.
- May 13 – Battle of Pallene: A Christian fleet defeats a Turkish fleet at Pallene, Chalcidice.
- October 24 – Smyrniote Crusade: A Christian fleet succeeds in taking the port city of Smyrna from the Aydinid Turks.
- December 6 – Five-year-old Erik Magnusson, the eldest son of King Magnus IV of Sweden, is appointed heir to the Swedish throne, even though Sweden is an elective monarchy at this time.

=== Date unknown ===
- King Edward III of England introduces three new gold coins, the florin, leopard, and helm. Unfortunately, the amount of gold in the coins does not match their value of 6 shillings, 3 shillings, and 1 shilling and sixpence, so they have to be withdrawn and mostly melted down, by August of this year.
- Bablake School is founded in Coventry, England by the dowager Queen Isabella.
- The Compagnia dei Bardi in Florence goes bankrupt, along with the Peruzzi Bank and the Acciaiuoli Bank.
- A large public dial clock is installed in the tower of the Palazzo Capitaniato, Padua, commissioned by Prince Ubertino I da Carrara and supervised by Jacopo Dondi dell'Orologio.
- A famine occurs in China.
- King Peter IV of Aragon defeats and deposes his cousin, James III of Majorca, thereby absorbing the Balearic Kingdom of Majorca into the Crown of Aragon.
- Newaya Krestos succeeds his father Amda Seyon I as Emperor of Ethiopia

== Births ==
- February 9 – Meinhard III, Count of Tyrol (d. 1363)
- September 18 – Marie Valois, French princess, daughter of King John II of France (d. 1404)
- October 10 – Mary Plantagenet, duchess consort of Brittany, daughter of King Edward III of England (d. 1362)
- date unknown
  - Beatrix of Bavaria, queen consort of Sweden (d. 1359)
  - Azzo X d'Este, Italian condottiero (d. 1415)
  - John I, Count of La Marche (d. 1393)
  - Parameswara, Malay Srivijayan prince (d. 1424)

== Deaths ==
- January 4 – Robert de Lisle, 1st Baron Lisle, English peer (b. 1288)
- January 11 – Thomas Charlton, Bishop of Hereford, Lord High Treasurer of England, Lord Privy Seal, and Lord Chancellor of Ireland
- January 30 – William Montacute, 1st Earl of Salisbury (b. 1301)
- April 17 – Constantine II, King of Armenia (Gosdantin, Կոստանդին Բ)
- June 29 – Joan of Savoy, duchess consort of Brittany, throne claimant of Savoy (b. 1310)
- July 11 – Ulrich III, Count of Württemberg (b. c. 1286)
- July 16 – An-Nasir Ahmad, deposed Bahri Mamluk sultan of Egypt (b. 1316)
- date unknown
  - Gersonides, French rabbi and mathematician (b. 1288)
  - Raoul I of Brienne, Count of Eu
  - Amda Seyon I, Emperor of Ethiopia
  - Wajih ad-Din Mas'ud, leader of the Sarbadars of Sabzewar
  - Prince Narinaga, Japanese Shōgun (b. 1326, d. either 1337 or 1344, the sources are contradictory).
- probable – Simone Martini, Sienese painter (b. 1284)
