= 1340s in England =

Events from the 1340s in England

== Incumbents ==
- Monarch – Edward III

== Events ==
- 1340
  - 25 January – King Edward III of England is declared King of France.
  - Maundy Thursday – great fire at Spondon in Derbyshire.
  - 24 June – Hundred Years' War: The Battle of Sluys is fought between the naval fleets of England and France. The battle ends with the almost complete destruction of the French fleet.
  - 26 July – Hundred Years' War: French victory at the Battle of Saint-Omer.
  - 25 September – Hundred Years' War: Temporary Truce of Espléchin between England and France.
  - 27 October – Michael of Northgate completes his translation of the Ayenbite of Inwyt.
  - Weights and Measures Act provides that "Bushels and Weights shall be made and sent into every Country."
  - 1340 or 1341 – Richard Folville and fellow members of the Folville gang are cornered and decapitated at his church in Teigh, Rutland.
- 1341
  - 18 January – The Queen's College in the University of Oxford, is founded.
  - July – Breton War of Succession: England and France support rival claimants to the duchy of Brittany.
- 1342
  - 20 May–22 July – Colchester is besieged and ransomed for the first time by John FitzWalter, 2nd Baron FitzWalter of Lexden in a dispute with the townspeople.
  - 18 August – Breton War of Succession: The English win a decisive naval battle over the Genoese fleet at the Battle of Brest.
  - September – Breton War of Succession: Indecisive Battle of Morlaix fought between the French and the English.
  - October – Breton War of Succession: England conquers most of Brittany.
- 1343
  - 28 March – earthquake felt in Lindsey, Lincolnshire.
  - May – English forces under Henry, 3rd Earl of Lancaster, accompanied by his son Henry, Earl of Derby, and William Montagu, Earl of Salisbury, arrive to aid the Crown of Castile in the Siege of Algeciras (1342–44).
- 1344
  - 19 June – three-day "Round Table" tournament held at Windsor Castle.
  - Edward III introduces three new gold coins, the florin, leopard, and helm. Unfortunately the amount of gold in the coins does not match their value of six shillings, three shillings, and one shilling and sixpence, so they have to be withdrawn and mostly melted down by August of this year.
  - Hundred Years' War: Peace talks, sponsored by the Avignon Pope, fail.
  - Licence to crenellate Chillingham Castle in Northumberland issued.
- 1345
  - August – Hundred Years' War: English victory over the French at the Battle of Bergerac.
  - 21 October – Hundred Years' War: English victory over the French at the Battle of Auberoche.
- 1346
  - April – Hundred Years' War: French invade Gascony.
  - 9 June – Breton War of Succession: At the Battle of St Pol de Leon, Thomas Dagworth's army defeats that of Charles, Duke of Brittany.
  - 26 July – Hundred Years' War: English victory over the French at the Battle of Caen.
  - 24 August – Hundred Years' War: English victory over the French at the Battle of Blanchetaque.
  - 26 August – Hundred Years' War: The English under Edward III and Edward, the Black Prince win a decisive victory over the French at the Battle of Crécy.
  - 4 September – Hundred Years' War: English besiege Calais.
  - 17 October – Second War of Scottish Independence: England wins a decisive victory over the Scots at the Battle of Neville's Cross.
- 1347
  - June – Hundred Years' War: English defeat a French claimant to the duchy of Brittany.
  - 4 August – Hundred Years' War: English capture Calais following the Siege of Calais. The town remains an English possession until 1558.
  - 28 September – Hundred Years' War: Temporary truce with France.
  - 24 December – Pembroke College in the University of Cambridge is founded by Marie de St Pol, Countess of Pembroke, as the Hall of Valence Marie.
- 1348
  - January – Gonville Hall, the forerunner of Gonville and Caius College, Cambridge, is founded.
  - 23 April (Saint George's Day) – Edward III creates the first English order of chivalry, the Order of the Garter, at Windsor Castle.
  - By 24 June – the Black Death pandemic has reached England, the bacterium Yersinia pestis having probably been brought by a sailor from Gascony to the port of Melcombe (modern-day Weymouth, Dorset). It spreads across the south and west, rapidly reaching (or perhaps arising separately at) Bristol.
  - 1 July – Joan, daughter of Edward III, dies of the Black Death at Bordeaux while en route to marry Peter of Castile.
  - 28 July – William Zouche, Archbishop of York, issues a warning (Terribilis) to his diocese of "great mortalities, pestilences and infections of the air".
  - 28 September – John de Ufford nominated to the Archbishopric of Canterbury by papal bull.
  - By November – the Black Death has reached London. There is probably pneumonic plague present here also.
  - 14 December – John de Ufford becomes Archbishop of Canterbury.
- 1349
  - Black Death in England reaches the north, devastating York (May) and Chester. Over 20% and perhaps as many as 60% of the population die. The plague diminishes by the end of the year. Scots raid across the border as far south as Durham but through this or other means the plague spreads to Scotland.
  - January – Parliament is prorogued because of the plague.
  - 27 March – An earthquake strikes Meaux Abbey.
  - 20 May – John de Ufford dies of the Black Death before being consecrated Archbishop of Canterbury.
  - 18 June – The Ordinance of Labourers issued due to the large number of agricultural workers killed by the Black Death.
  - 19 June – Thomas Bradwardine elected to the Archbishopric of Canterbury.
  - 25 August – Thomas Bradwardine dies of the Plague.
  - October – Hundred Years' War: Small royal force enters Calais to protect the town against capture by France.
  - 17 November – Pope Clement VI annuls the marriage of William Montacute, 2nd Earl of Salisbury, and Joan of Kent, on the grounds of her prior marriage to Thomas Holland, 1st Earl of Kent.
  - 20 December – Simon Islip enthroned as Archbishop of Canterbury.

== Births ==
- 1340
  - 6 March – John of Gaunt, 1st Duke of Lancaster (died 1399)
- 1341
  - 4 January (possible date) – Wat Tyler, rebel leader (killed 1381)
  - 5 June – Edmund of Langley, son of King Edward III of England (died 1402)
  - 10 November – Henry Percy, 1st Earl of Northumberland (died 1408)
- 1342
  - 25 March – Humphrey de Bohun, 7th Earl of Hereford (died 1373)
  - Approximate date – Julian of Norwich, anchoress and mystic (died 1413)
- 1343
  - Thomas Percy, 1st Earl of Worcester, noble, naval commander and rebel leader (executed 1403)
  - Approximate date – Geoffrey Chaucer, poet (died 1400)
- 1344
  - Edmund Stafford, Lord Chancellor of England and Bishop of Exeter (died 1419)
- 1345
  - 25 March – Blanche of Lancaster, wife of John of Gaunt (died 1369)
  - Approximate date – Eleanor Maltravers, noblewoman and heiress (died 1405)
- 1346
  - Richard Fitzalan, 4th Earl of Arundel (died 1397)
- 1348 – Approximate date:
  - John FitzAlan, 1st Baron Arundel, soldier (died 1379)
  - Alice Perrers, mistress of King Edward III (died 1400/01)

== Deaths ==
- 1340
  - 5 April – William Melton, archbishop (year of birth unknown)
  - 4 December – Henry Burghersh, bishop and chancellor (born 1292)
  - 1340/1 – Richard Folville, outlaw and parson, dies resisting arrest (year of birth unknown)
- 1344
  - 30 January – William Montagu, 1st Earl of Salisbury, courtier and King of Man (born 1301)
- 1345
  - 14 April – Richard de Bury (Richard Aungerville), Bishop of Durham, scholar and bibliophile (born 1287)
  - 22 September – Henry, 3rd Earl of Lancaster (born 1281)
- 1346
  - Eustace Folville, outlaw and murderer (born (c. 1288)
- 1347
  - June – John de Warenne, 7th Earl of Surrey (born 1286)
  - Adam Murimuth, ecclesiastic and chronicler (born 1274/75)
- 1348
  - 23 August – John de Stratford, Archbishop of Canterbury and Lord Chancellor (born c. 1275)
- 1349
  - 10 April – William of Ockham, philosopher (born 1285)
  - 31 May – Thomas Wake, politician (born 1297)
  - 26 August – Thomas Bradwardine, scholastic philosopher and Archbishop of Canterbury, plague (born c. 1300)
  - 29 September – Richard Rolle, religious writer (born 1300)
