= Hemi =

Hemi may refer to:

== People ==
- Hemi (name)

== Places ==
- Hemi Station, Japan

== Vehicles ==
- Hemispherical combustion chamber
  - Donovan hemi, an engine of this type
  - Chrysler Hemi engine, an engine of this type
  - Dodge Super 8 Hemi, a car with the Chrysler Hemi engine

== Other ==
- hemi, prefix meaning "half"
- Hemi group, involved in Illinois v. Hemi Group LLC
- Hemi Naga, one of the Naga ethnic groups

== See also ==
- Semi (disambiguation)
- Demi (disambiguation)
