= Demetria (name) =

- Gender: Female

Origin
- Origin: Greek
- Meaning: "follower of Demeter"

Other names
- Related names: Demetrius, Demetrios, Dmitry, Demi, Dem, Demeter, Demetra, Demet, Metra

Demetria is a given name, the feminine form of the Greek name Demetrius, which means "follower of Demeter". Variations of Demetria include Demetri, Dem, Demet, Demetra, Metra, and Demi; the common diminutive form of the name is also used as a nickname for Demetria.

People named Demetria include:

- St. Demetria (died 362), Christian virgin martyr
- Demetria Kalodimos, American anchorperson
- Demetria "Demi" Lovato (born 1992), American singer, songwriter and actress
- Demetria McKinney (born 1979), American actress, model and singer
- Demetria Royals, American director, producer, and editor
- Demetria Sance (born 1977), American former indoor volleyball player
- Demetria Taylor (born 1973), American Chicago blues singer and songwriter
- Demetria Washington (born 1979), American former sprinter
