= 6/8 =

6/8 may refer to:

- A fraction equivalent to 3/4 or 0.75.
- June 8 (month-day date notation)
- 6 August (day-month date notation)
- 6/8, a time signature used in Western musical notation
- 6 shillings and 8 (old) pence in UK pre-decimal currency = 80d or 1/3 of a pound sterling
  - A mediaeval English coin called a noble; later a notional value of 1/3 of a pound sterling
- 6/8 vision, a measure of visual acuity in metric units

== See also ==
- 8/6 (disambiguation)
