= Demy (coin) =

Scottish gold coin under reign of James I of Scotland

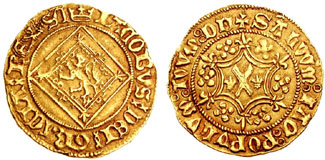

The Demy was a Scottish gold coin struck under reign of James I of Scotland and based on the English half Noble coin. With a face value 9 Scottish shillings the coin was later replaced with the Lion coin by James II of Scotland

== Bibliography ==
- Lindsay, John (1845). A View of the Coinage of Scotland. Messrs. Bolster.
