= Demi =

- Pronunciation: Dem-EE
- Gender: Unisex

Origin
- Origin: Latin
- Meaning: Short for "Demetria" and "Demetrius"

Other names
- Related names: Demetria, Demetrios, Demetrius

Demi is a unisex but mostly feminine given name with Greek and Latin roots, and it is a surname with Albanian origins. Demi was originally a nickname of Demetria, the feminine form of the masculine name Demetrius, which is itself the Latin and English spelling of the Greek name Demetrios. People named Demi include:

== Given name ==
- Demi Adejuyigbe (born 1992), British-born American writer, comedian, and social media personality
- Demi Burnett (born 1995), American television personality
- Demi de Jong (born 1995), Dutch road cyclist
- Demi Evans (born 1960s), American singer
- Demi Getschko (born 1954), Brazilian computer scientist
- Demi Harman (born 1993), Australian actress and television presenter
- Demi Lambourne (born 1996), English footballer
- Demi Lardner, Australian comedian
- Demi Lovato (born 1992), American singer, songwriter and actress
- Demi Moore (born 1962), American actress
- Demi Mills (born 2004), American actress
- Demi Orimoloye (born 1997), Canadian baseball player
- Demi Isaac (born 2000), Nigerian-born Irish actress
- Demi Rose (born 1995), British model and social media personality
- Demi Schuurs (born 1993), Dutch tennis player
- Demi Stokes (born 1991), English footballer
- Demi Vance (born 1991), Northern Irish footballer
- Demi Vermeulen (born 1995), Dutch Paralympic equestrian
- Demi-Leigh Tebow (born 1995), South African beauty pageants titleholder and Miss Universe 2017
- Demi Vollering (born 1996), Dutch road cyclist

== Surname ==
- Ali Demi (1918–1943), Albanian killed fighting the Germans in World War II, one of the founders of the Communist Party of Albania
- Leonard Demi, Albanian politician elected in 2009
- Musa Demi (1878–1971), Albanian revolutionary and writer
- Niazi Demi (1919–1977), Albanian politician
- Tahir Demi (1919–1961), Albanian politician

== Other ==
- Demi (artist) (born 1955), Cuban-born American contemporary painter
- Demi (author) (born 1942), nickname of Charlotte Dumaresq Hunt, American children's book author
- Demi Bennett, ring name of Rhea Ripley (born 1996), Australian professional wrestler
- Demi Delia, stage name of Gina Rodriguez (pornographic actress) (born 1967)

== Fictional characters ==
- Demi the Demoness, underground comic book character
- Demi Bourbon, survivor in the video game Identity V
- Demi Miller, in the BBC soap opera EastEnders

== See also ==
- Demy
- Demy (surname)
