= Semi =

Semi- is a numerical prefix meaning "half". The prefix alone is often used as an abbreviation when the rest of the word (the thing which half of is being described) is clear from context.

Semi or SEMI may refer to:

== In general ==
- Semiconductor industry, also known as semi or semis in financial news
- Semi-automatic firearm
- Semi-detached house, a type of housing
- Semi-erection, a partial erection when the penis is enlarged but not fully erect
- Semi-final, of a knockout competition
- Semi-formal, (esp. high school) dance
- Semiquaver, the time interval in music, which is half the length of a quaver
- Semi-submersible, a watercraft which operates mostly submerged
- Semi-trailer truck (UK: articulated lorry), a truck design of a tractor vehicle pulling semi-trailers
  - Semi-trailer, a trailer with wheels at the rear end only
  - Tractor unit (semi truck engine), the motortruck engine drive unit vehicle that pulls the trailers
  - Road train, an extreme version of the semi truck train of trailers

== Groups, organizations ==
- Semiconductor Equipment and Materials International (SEMI)

== People ==
- Semi Kunatani (born 1990), Fiji rugby union player for the Tel Aviv Heat
- Semi Ojeleye (born 1994), American basketball player
- Goo Semi (born 2002), South Korean singer and bassist, member of Latency and former member of Cignature

== Other uses ==
- Tesla Semi, the "Semi", from Tesla Motors; an EV all-electric battery-powered primemover tractor unit for big-rig trucking,

== See also ==
- Demi (disambiguation)
- Hemi (disambiguation)
- Half (disambiguation)
