= List of Putney School people =

== Alumni ==
According to The Putney School 2008 Alumni Directory, alumni of The Putney School include (graduation date shown, where applicable):

- Sam Amidon, musician
- David Amram '48, composer
- Tim Asch '51, anthropologist, filmmaker
- Carlos Buhler '72, mountaineer
- Peter L. Buttenwieser, educator, philanthropist, member of the Lehman family
- Tim Caldwell, Olympic cross-country skier, son of John Caldwell
- Jonathan Crary, art historian
- Dave Cole '96, sculptor
- Carlton Cuse '77, television writer/executive of LOST
- Tim Daly '74, actor
- Alicia Dana '87, U.S. Paralympian
- Lydia Davis '65, writer, Man Booker International Prize recipient
- Thulani Davis '61, playwright, journalist, librettist, novelist, poet, and screenwriter
- Anna Dewdney '83, children's book author and illustrator
- Barnaby Dorfman '86, inventor, technology products
- Mahdi ElMandjra '50, Moroccan futurist, economist and sociologist
- Kai T. Erikson '49, sociologist
- David J. Griffiths '60, physicist, teacher
- William B. Gray, U.S. Attorney for Vermont
- Andrea Gruber, soprano
- Peter Heller, writer and kayaker
- William Hinton '36, author, agricultural advisor, People's Republic of China
- Joan Hinton '39, atomic physicist, dairy farmer in China
- Lee Hirsch '90, filmmaker.
- Jeffrey Hollender '73, CEO of Seventh Generation Inc.
- Reid Hoffman '85, web entrepreneur, co-founder of LinkedIn
- Felicity Huffman '81, actor
- Jeffrey Jones '64, actor
- Kathleen Kennedy Townsend '69, lieutenant governor of Maryland
- Kerry Kennedy '77, lawyer and human rights activist
- Bill Koch '73, Olympic cross-country skiing medalist
- Steven Kunes '74, TV writer and producer
- Mike Ladd, hip-hop artist
- Jonathan Lash '63, Hampshire College president
- Ellen Hamilton Latzen '99, actor
- Téa Leoni (Pantaleoni) '84, actor
- Christopher Lehmann-Haupt, '52, journalist, critic, novelist
- J. Anthony Lukas '51, Pulitzer Prize-winning journalist and author
- Sally Mann '69, fine-art photographer
- Jared Martin, actor
- Joanna Miles '58, Emmy award-winning actress in The Glass Menagerie
- Adrian Morris, painter
- Errol Morris '65, filmmaker
- Nell Newman '78, co-founder/owner, Newman's Own
- Heather Nova '83, musician and songwriter
- Eli Noyes '60, film animator
- Ken Olin '72 actor, director and TV producer
- Priscilla Paetsch '50, violinist, composer
- Bob Perelman '64, poet, literary critic and professor
- Jonathan Piel '57, science journalist, past editor of Scientific American
- Tyler Rasch '06, television personality
- Noel Rockmore '47, painter, portraitist
- Martha Rockwell '62, Olympic cross-country skier
- Jonathan Rosenbaum '61, film critic
- Demetria Royals, filmmaker
- Jonathan Schell '61, author
- Wallace Shawn '61, actor, playwright
- Lucy Shelton '61, soprano
- Harper Simon '90, singer-songwriter, guitarist and producer and son of Paul Simon
- Alexis Stewart '83, television host, daughter of Martha Stewart
- Eliot Weinberger, essayist
- Peter Willcox '72, Greenpeace activist, Arctic Sunrise captain
- Ellen Winner '65, professor specializing in the psychology of art
- John Bell Young, American concert pianist

== Faculty ==
Some Putney faculty members (subject taught in parentheses) had careers that extended beyond their teaching.

- Eric Aho (art), American painter
- John H. Caldwell (mathematics), Nordic skier on the U.S. Olympic Ski Team, author and Nordic coach of the U.S. Olympic Ski Team
- Chard deNiord (English, philosophy), Poet Laureate of Vermont
- Eric Evans (English) Olympic canoeist
- Fernando Gerassi (art), artist
- Peter C. Goldmark Jr. (history), environmentalist, publisher, and executive
- Peter Schumann (dance), founder of the Bread and Puppet Theater
- Margarete Seeler (art), German-born American artist, designer, educator, and author
