= Demi (author) =

American writer

- Born: Charlotte Dumaresq Hunt; September 2, 1942 (age 83) Cambridge, Massachusetts, U.S.
- Occupation: Author, illustrator
- Education: Instituto Allende; Immaculate Heart College
- Genre: Children's literature
- Spouse: Tze-si Huang

Demi (born Charlotte Dumaresq Hunt; September 2, 1942) is a children’s book author and illustrator. During her career she has published over 300 titles.

== Biography ==
=== Early life and education ===
Demi was born in Cambridge, Massachusetts. She is the great-grand daughter of the American painter William Morris Hunt, and the great-grand niece of architect Richard Morris Hunt. Demi earned her nickname as a young child when her father started calling her "demi" because she was half the size of her sister.

She studied art at Instituto Allende, Mexico, and with Sister Corita at the Immaculate Heart College in Los Angeles. She was a Fulbright scholar at the Maharaja Sayajirao University of Baroda, India.

=== Career ===
Demi is known for her biographies for spiritual figures including Mahavira, Buddha, Krishna, Lao Tzu, Jesus, Mary (mother of Jesus), Muhammad, Rumi, Francis of Assisi, Gandhi, and the Dalai Lama.

==== Awards and honors ====
The Empty Pot was selected by former First Lady Barbara Bush in 1990 as one of the books to be read on the ABC Radio program Mrs. Bush's Story Time. Based on a 2007 online poll, the National Education Association listed The Empty Pot as one of its "Teachers' Top 100 Books for Children." Gandhi was awarded the Oppenheim Toy Portfolio Platinum Award, while Muhammad was named a New York Times Best Illustrated Book.

Master of Zen: Extraordinary Teachings from Hui Neng’s Altar Sutra (World Wisdom, 2012), illustrated by Demi and translated and adapted by her husband Tze-si Huang, won a 2012 USA Best Book Award (Religion - Buddhism category).

One Grain Of Rice: A Mathematical Folktale was awarded Mathical Hall of Fame status.

A full list of over 20 awards and honors given to Demi’s books published by Wisdom Tales Press can be found on Demi’s author page at the publisher’s website.

In 1990, Demi and her husband Tze-si “Jesse” Huang represented the United States at the First Children’s International Book Conference in Beijing.

== Select bibliography ==
- Marie Curie, Henry Holt and Co., 2018
- Florence Nightingale, Henry Holt and Co., 2014
- The Fantastic Adventures of Krishna, Wisdom Tales, 2013
- St. Francis of Assisi, Wisdom Tales, 2012
- Conference of the Birds (Illustrator, by Alexis York), Wisdom Tales, 2012
- Master of Zen: Extraordinary Teachings from Hui Neng’s Altar Sutra,(Illustrator, translated and adapted by Tze-si Huang), World Wisdom, 2012
- Tutankhamun, Marshall Cavendish, 2009
- Genghis Khan, Marshall Cavendish, 2009
- Rumi: Persian Poet, Whirling Dervish, Marshall Cavendish, 2009
- The Girl Who Drew a Phoenix, Margaret K. McElderry, 2008
- Marco Polo, Marshall Cavendish, 2008
- The Magic Pillow, Margaret K. McElderry, 2008
- The Boy Who Painted Dragons, Margaret K. McElderry, 2007
- The Legend of Lao Tzu and Tao Te Ching, Margaret K. McElderry, 2007
- Su Dongpo: Chinese Genius, Lee & Low, 2006
- Mary, Margaret K. McElderry, 2005
- Mother Theresa, Margaret K. McElderry, 2005
- Jesus, Margaret K. McElderry, 2005
- The Greatest Power, Margaret K. McElderry, 2004
- The Legend of St Nicholas, Margaret K. McElderry, 2003
- Muhammad, Margaret K. McElderry, 2003
- King Midas: The Golden Touch, Margaret K. McElderry, 2002
- Gandhi, Margaret K. McElderry, 2001
- The Dalai Lama: Foreword by his Holiness The Dalai Lama, Henry Holt and Company 1998
- One Grain of Rice: A Mathematical Folk Tale, Scholastic, 1997
- Buddha, Henry Holt and Company, 1996
- The Empty Pot, Henry Holt and Company, 1990
- Liang and the Magic Paintbrush, Henry Holt and Company, 1988
- The Hallowed Horse: A Folktale from India, Dodd Mead, 1987
