= Jean-Jacques Milteau =

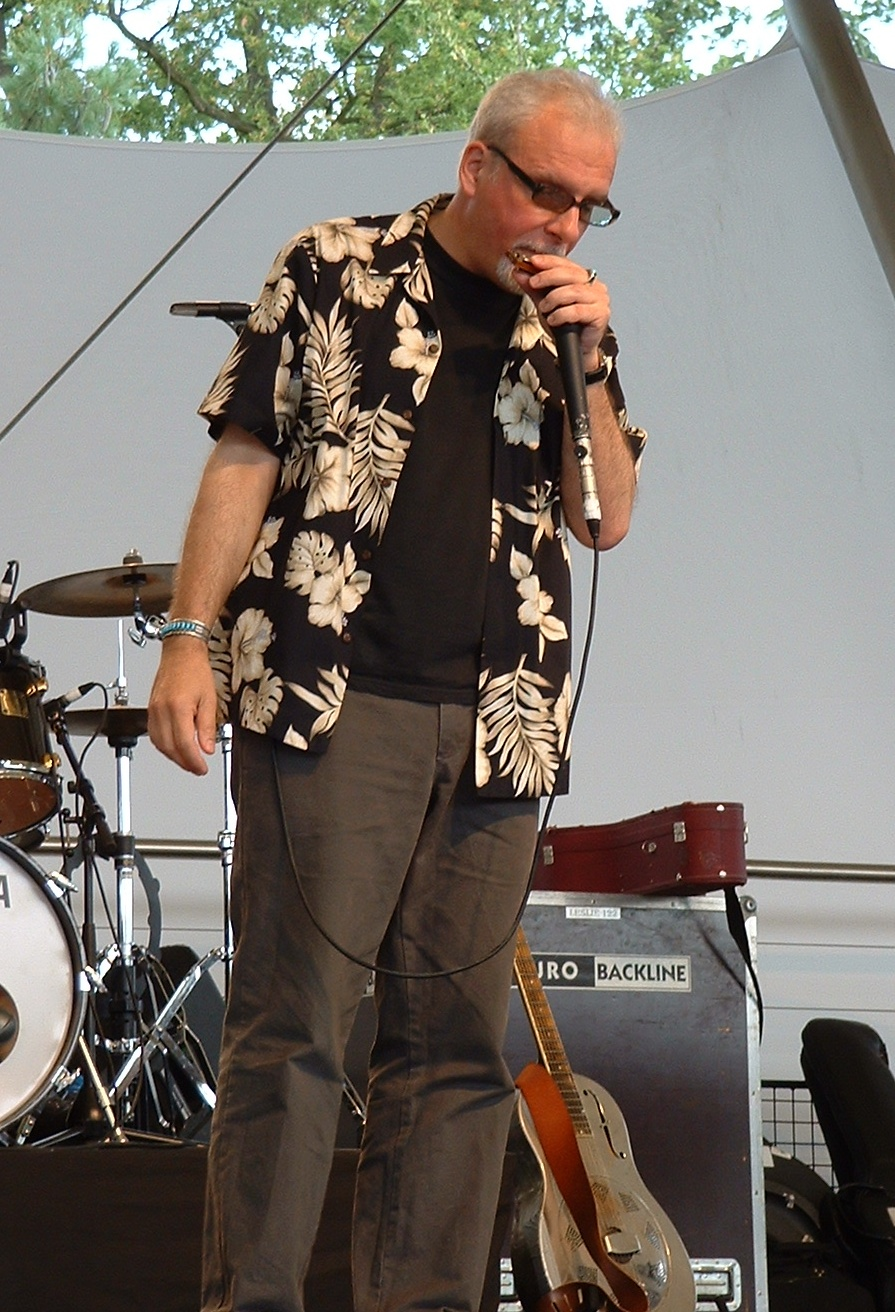

Background information
- Born: 17 April 1950 (age 76); Paris, France
- Genre: Blues
- Instruments: Harmonica; singing

Jean-Jacques Milteau (born 17 April 1950, Paris) is a French blues harmonica player, singer, and songwriter, as well as radio presenter.

== Career ==
Milteau became interested in the harmonica when he first heard folk and rock music (such as Bob Dylan and The Rolling Stones) in the 1960s. He played with French singers such as Yves Montand, Eddy Mitchell, Renaud, Jean-Jacques Goldman, Maxime Le Forestier, Barbara, and Charles Aznavour in various styles, from blues to jazz. He has been a member of the French bands Les Enfoirés and New Bluegrass Connection.

In 1989, he recorded his first solo album, Blues Harp, and toured the world with Manu Galvin at the guitar and with guest musicians including Mighty Mo Rodgers and Demi Evans. He has authored methods for learning the harmonica and, since 2001, is leading a radio show dedicated to blues on the French station TSF Jazz.

In 2017, Milteau collaborated on a new album by Eric Bibb entitled Migration Blues.

== Awards ==
- 2001: Best Blues Album: Memphis (French Victoire de la musique)

== Selected discography ==
- 1983: Just Kiddin' with Mauro Serri
- 1989: Blues Harp
- 1991: Explorer
- 1992: Le grand blues band et J.J. Milteau
- 1993: Live
- 1995: Routes
- 1996: Merci d'être venus
- 1998: Blues live
- 1999: Bastille blues
- 2000: Honky Tonk blues (live)
- 2001: Memphis with Little Milton and Mighty Sam McClain
- 2003: Blue 3rd with Gil Scott-Heron, Terry Callier, N’Dambi, Howard Johnson
- 2006: Fragile
- 2007: Live, hot n'blues (Universal) with Demi Evans and Andrew Jones
- 2008: Soul Conversation with Michael Robinson and Ron Smyth
- 2009: Harmonicas
- 2011: Consideration with Michael Robinson and Ron Smyth
- 2012: Blowin' in the past
- 2015: Lead Belly's Gold with Eric Bibb
- 2018: CrossBorder Blues with Harrison Kennedy and Vincent Ségal
- 2021: Lost Highway
