= Demy (surname) =

Demy is a surname. Notable persons with that name include:

- Jacques Demy (1931–1990), French film director
- Mathieu Demy (born 1972), French actor, film director and producer
- Valentine Demy (born 1963), Italian actress

== See also ==
- Michèle Demys (born 1943), French athlete
- Demi and Demy, short given names
