= Lion (coin) =

Scottish coin struck in 1451

A Lion was a Scottish gold coin ordered to be struck in 1451 that featured a lion on one side and a depiction of St. Andrew on the other. The coin weighed the same as half an English Noble and was worth six shillings and eight pence.

== Bibliography ==
- Lindsay, John (1845). A View of the Coinage of Scotland. Messrs. Bolster.
