= Demy =

Demy may refer to:

- Demy, a paper size measuring 17.5 × 22.5 in (445 × 572 mm)
- Demy (singer) (born 1991), Greek singer
  - Demy (album), 2017
- Demy (surname)
- Demy (coin)
- Demy de Vries (born 1999), Dutch fashion model
- Demy de Zeeuw (born 1983), Dutch footballer
- Demy, a recipient of a demyship, a scholarship at Magdalen College, Oxford

== See also ==
- Demi (disambiguation)
