= Demi Evans =

American singer-songwriter

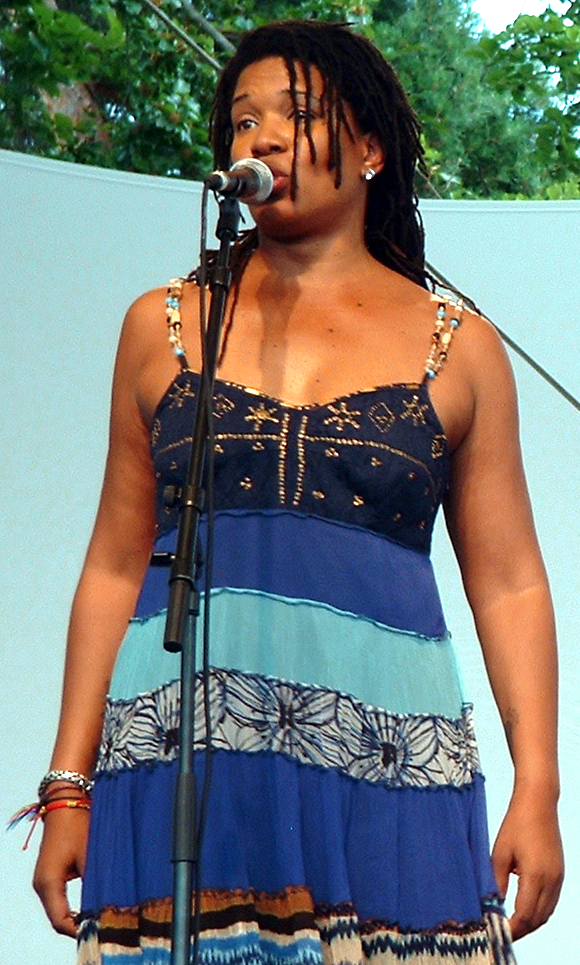
- Demi Evans in Paris, 2006

Background information
- Birth name: Demetrious Evans
- Born: 1960s Dallas, Texas, U.S.
- Genres: Blues, jazz
- Occupation: Vocalist
- Years active: 1990s–present
- Website: www.myspace.com/demievans

Demi Evans is an American vocalist and lyricist from Dallas, Texas.

== Biography ==
Demi Evans was born in the 1960s in North Dallas. She was raised by her grandmother, who was a singer in the clubs of Dallas. This gave Evans the opportunity to meet singers such as Johnnie Taylor. When she was fourteen, he worked at the Dallas Morning News. In Los Angeles, she was recruited by a model agency and used the income to pay for acting lessons.

She moved to New York in the middle of the 1980s and started performing in comedy acts where she imitated singer Grace Jones. She was a model for Jean-Paul Gaultier and Christian Lacroix in Paris, Milan, or Vienna. Evans moved to Germany and worked with DJ Sven Väth. She released a few pop singles. Back in the U.S. she began working with Stevie Wonder. She left modeling for a career as a singer and returned to Europe. During the summer of 1995, she was in a car accident. After a long recovery, she decided to live in Paris and work with drummer Paco Séry and Fred Morisset.

She has worked in the group of Jean-Jacques Milteau.

Evans released her first album, Why Do You Run, in the spring of 2006 and toured European jazz festivals. In 2007 she sang at the Olympia.

== Discography ==
=== As leader ===
- Why Do You Run (Iris, 2006)

=== As guest ===
- Fragile, Jean-Jacques Milteau (Universal)
- Live, Hot 'n Blue Jean-Jacques Milteau (Universal)
