= Demi (disambiguation) =

Demi is a feminine given name and a surname. It may also refer to:

== Amounts ==
- demi (metric prefix) (or demi-), a former metric unit prefix not adopted by SI
- demi- (numerical prefix), a linguistic prefix representing half, see Numeral prefix
- "demi" (word), see List of Latin words with English derivatives
- "demi-" (medicine), see List of medical roots, suffixes and prefixes

== Other uses ==
- Demi (album), by Demi Lovato
- Demi River, Gujarat, India
- Short for demisexual, a sexual orientation
- Short for demigender, a gender identity

== See also ==
- Demy (disambiguation)
