= Hemi (name) =

Hemi or Hēmi is both a given name or a surname. In the Māori language, it is a transliteration of the name James. Notable people with the name include:

== Surname ==
- Jack Hemi (1914–1996), New Zealand freezing worker, rugby union and league player, and shearer
- Ronald Hemi (1933–2000), New Zealand rugby union player
- Tiwini Hemi, rugby union player

== Given name ==
- Hemi Bawa (born 1948), Indian painter and sculptor
- Hemi Baxter, or James K. Baxter (1926–1972), New Zealand poet
- Hemi Doron (born 1956), Israeli politician
- Hēmi Pītiti Huata (1860s–1954), New Zealand tribal leader and Anglican clergyman
- Hemi Pomara (born c. 1831), Māori chief
- Hēmi Pōtatau (1904–1994), New Zealand Presbyterian minister, soldier, writer
- Hemi Rudner (born 1964), Israeli music artist
- Hemi Taylor (born 1963), New Zealand-born Welsh rugby union player
- Hēmi Tōpine Te Mamaku (died 1887), Māori chief

== See also ==
- Akhethetep Hemi (fl. c. 2360 BC), ancient Egyptian official
