= Quarter florin =

Coin issued by King Edward III of England

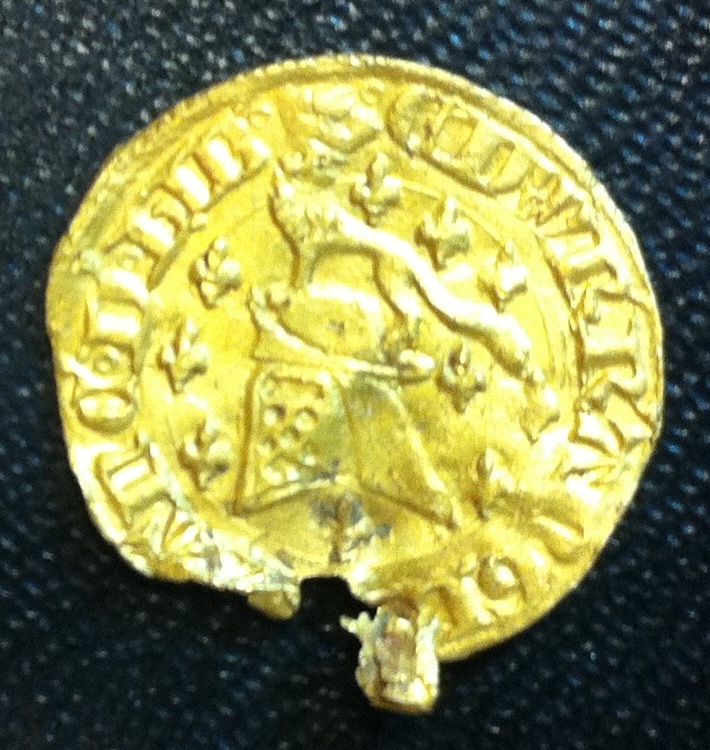
Obverse

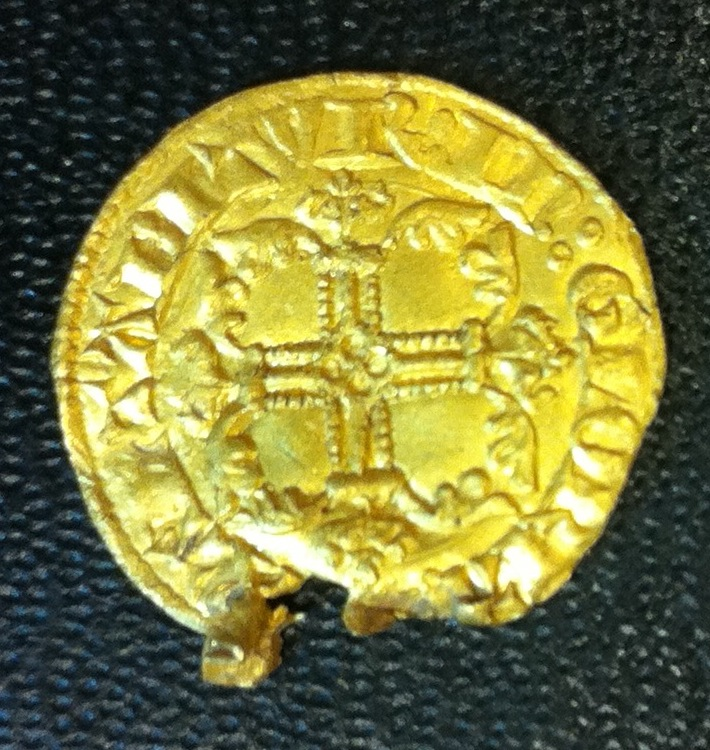
Reverse

Quarter florin minted in London, 1344.

The quarter florin, half leopard or helm was an attempt by English King Edward III to produce a gold coinage suitable for use in Europe as well as in England (see also double leopard and leopard). The Helm, based on contemporary European gold coins had a value of one shilling and sixpence (3/40 pound sterling). However, the gold used to strike the coins was overvalued, resulting in the coins being unacceptable to the public, and the coins were withdrawn after only seven months in circulation, and eventually demonetised in August 1344, to be melted down to produce the more popular gold Noble.

The obverse of the coin shows the royal helmet surmounted by a cap of maintenance and a leopard; the legend is EDWR R ANGL Z FRANC D HIB (Edward King of England and France, Lord of Ireland). The reverse of the coin shows a floriated cross with a quatrefoil in the centre; the legend is EXALTABITUR IN GLORIA ("He shall be exalted in glory", Psalm 112:9).

In 2015, an example was found in Colyton, Devon. It was sold for £50,000.
