= Tandem Verlag =

- Founded: 1994
- Founder: Herbert Ullmann and Hermann Rauers
- Country of origin: Germany
- Headquarters location: Königswinter
- Publication types: books, audiobooks, CDs and DVDs
- Official website: www.tandem-verlag.de

Tandem Verlag GmbH is a German publishing company and also wholesaler and distributor of print and electronic media products. In addition to producing printed books with a focus on wholesale and discount markets, Tandem Verlag publishes and distributes products in CD-ROM and DVD formats, software and video games packages, music CDs and audiobooks.

The publishing company was founded as a limited liability company in 1994 by business-partners Herbert Ullmann and Hermann Rauers. The headquarters were originally established in Mönchengladbach, later relocating in 1998 to premises in the town of Königswinter in the Cologne region of North Rhine-Westphalia.

By 1999 Tandem Verlag was Germany's fastest-growing publisher, with DM 63.2 million (£19 million) in sales representing a year-on-year sales increase of 70%.

In 2007 Tandem Verlag recorded sales of US$16 million, and had approximately 80 employees.
