= 8/6 =

8/6 may refer to:

- August 6 (month-day date notation)
- June 8 (day-month date notation)
