= Demet =

Demet is a feminine Turkish given name. In Turkish "demet" means "bundle" or "bouquet". It likely originates from the Greek δεμάτι, which means tie, bundle or sheaf.

== People ==
=== Given name ===
- Demet Akalın (born 1972), Turkish pop folk singer, former model
- Demet Akbağ (born 1959), Turkish theatre and film actress
- Demet Bozkurt (born 1996), Turkish women's footballer
- Demet Demir (born 1961), Turkish activist
- Demet Evgar (born 1980), Turkish actress
- Demet Mutlu (born 1981), Turkish businesswoman
- Demet Müftüoğlu (born 1974), Turkish artist
- Demet Özdemir (born 1992), Turkish actress
- Demet Parlak (born 1990), Turkish pole vaulter
- Demet Sağıroğlu (born 1966), Turkish pop music singer
- Demet Şener (born 1977), Turkish actress and former model
