= Half florin =

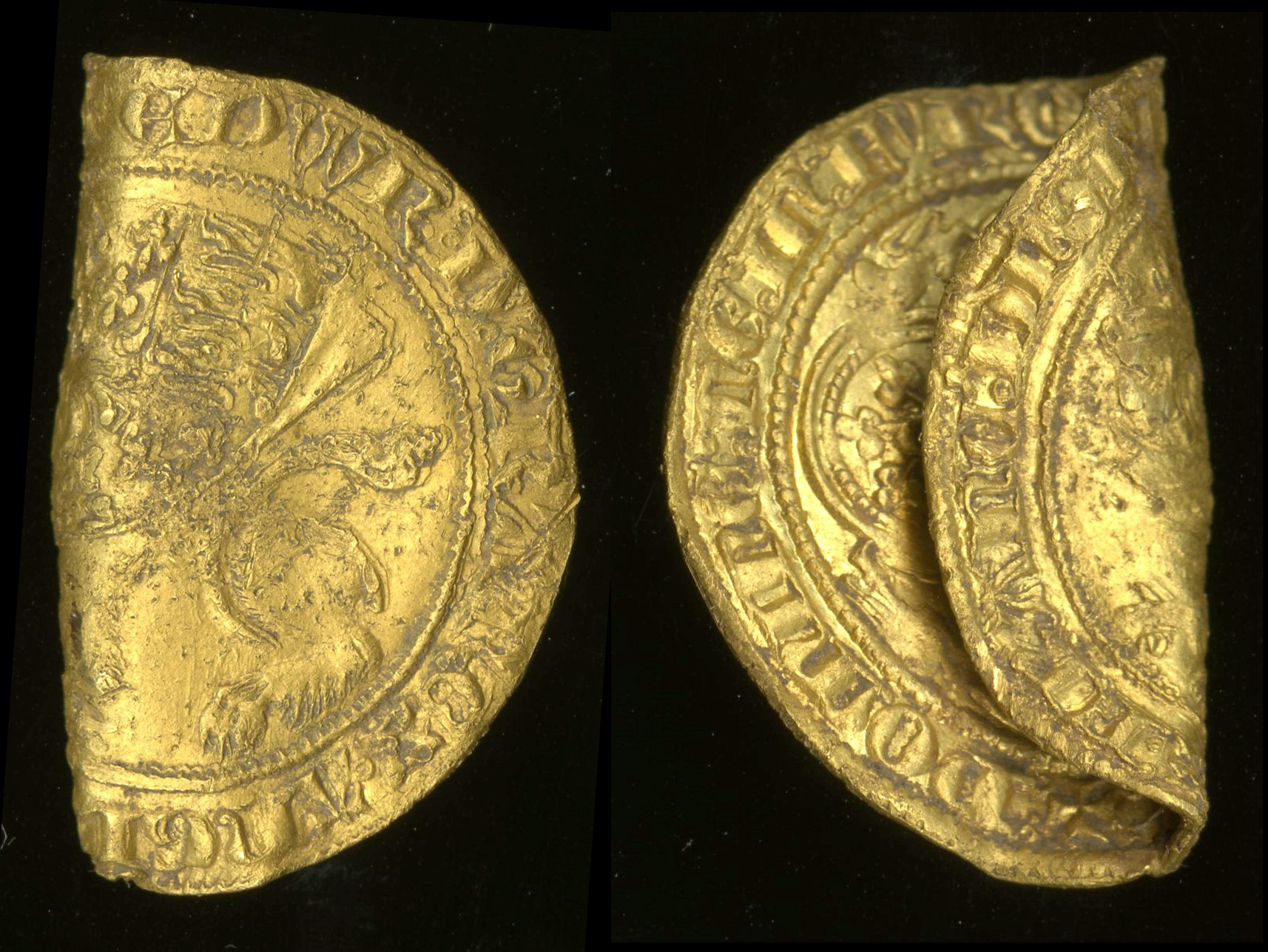
Specimen from the British Museum, which was folded in half when it was discovered in 2019.

The half florin (also known as a leopard) was an attempt by English King Edward III to produce a gold coinage suitable for use in Europe as well as in England. The half florin was largely based on contemporary European gold coins, with a value of three shillings (i.e. 3/20 pound). The gold used to strike the coins was overvalued, resulting in the coins being unacceptable to the public, and the coins were withdrawn after only a few months in circulation. In August 1344 they were melted down to produce the more popular noble. Few specimens have survived of what is often regarded as one of the most beautiful medieval English coins ever produced.

The obverse of the coin shows a leopard with a cloak of the royal arms; the legend is EDWAR D GRA REX ANGL Z FRANC DNS HIB ("Edward, by the Grace of God King of England and France, Lord of Ireland"). The reverse of the coin shows the Royal cross within a quatrefoil, a leopard in each quarter; the legend is DOMINE NE IN FURORE TUO ARGUAS ME ("O Lord, rebuke me not in Thy anger", from Psalm 6).

Only five examples are known to survive. In 2019, experts announced the discovery of an example from Reepham, Norfolk. This same coin was announced for auction in March 2022. It sold for £140,000.
