= Demetria Royals =

American film director

- Occupations: Film director, producer, film editor

Demetria Royals is an American director, producer, and Film editor.

== Education ==
She is an alumna of New York University's Graduate Institute of Television and Film in February 1982 where she earned her bachelors in journalism and her Masters of Fine Arts degree.

== Recognition ==
She received a Writers Fellowship from the Writers Guild of America, a New York Foundation for the Arts Fellowship in Video and a writing development grant from the Funding Exchange Women's Project Scriptwriting Development Fund. She is also a member of the Directors Guild of America since 1982. She was previously director of the Film program at Sarah Lawrence College. She was an associate professor of Media Arts and Writing in the School of Contemporary Arts art Ramapo College in New Jersey.

== Works ==
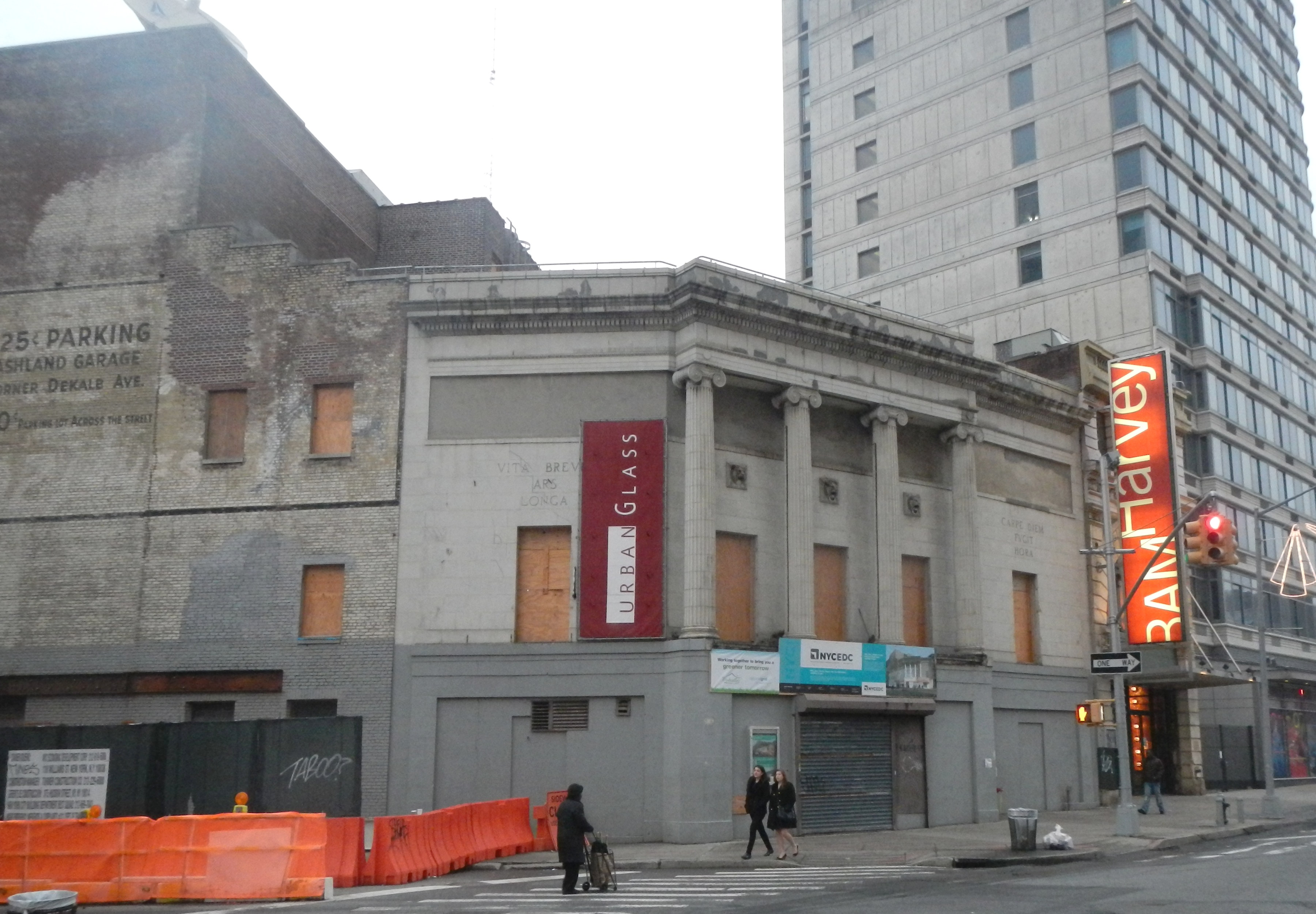
Majestic Theatre, Brooklyn

- Inventing Herself 1993
- Mama's Pushcart: Ellen Stewart and 25 years of La MaMa E.T.C. Conjure Women 1995

=== Inventing Herself ===
Royals began her public films with Inventing Herself, a videowall installation of images of African American women. This work premièred at the 1993 Mill Valley Film Festival. It was reset-up at the Majestic Theater of the Brooklyn Academy of Music along with an international arts fest in 1995.

=== Conjure Women ===
Conjure Women is a performance-based feature film documentary (1995) exploring the artistry and philosophy of African American female artists. They use their art expertise to recover the African traditions that their previous generations had to renounce. Having grown up in the West they must fight to reclaim their "Africanisms". The director Demetria Royals says it is "telling the story of African Americans in our own distinct and self-defined voices. " It also looks at challenging the existing stereotypes of African American culture. It was first shown at the 1995 Mill Valley Film Festival and broadcast on national television in February 1997. It is funded by the Corporation for Public Broadcasting and the National Endowment for the Arts. It lasts 85 minutes and is available on 16mm and video.
