= Florin (English coin) =

English gold coin of 1344

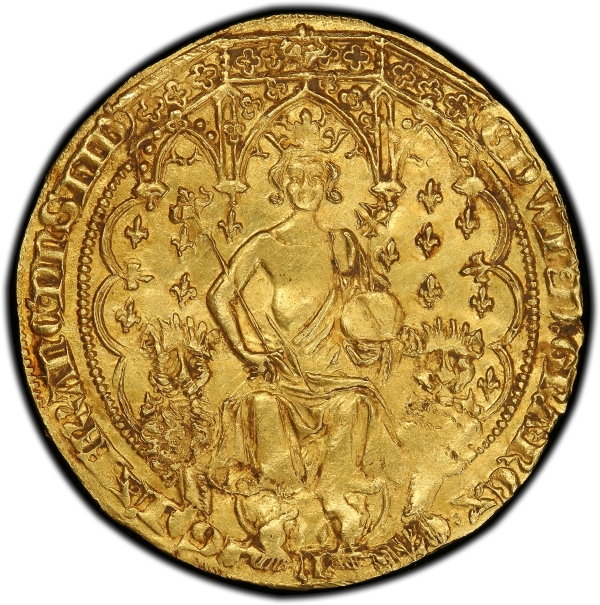
Obverse

The English florin, sometimes known as the double leopard, was an attempt in 1344 by Edward III to produce gold coinage suitable for use in Europe as well as in England. It was authorised on 27 January 1344, and struck from 108 grains (6.99829 grams; 9/40 troy ounce) of nominal pure ('fine') gold and had a value of six shillings (equivalent to 3/10 pound sterling).

The continental florin, based on a French coin and ultimately on coins issued in Florence in 1252, was a standard coin (3.50 g fine gold) widely used internationally. The newly-introduced English florin at twice this nominal weight was ultimately found to be wrongly tariffed, resulting in it being unacceptable to merchants. It was almost immediately withdrawn from circulation and in August 1344, after only a few months, it was replaced by the more successful gold noble (7.80g gold, valued at 6s 8d).

== Description ==
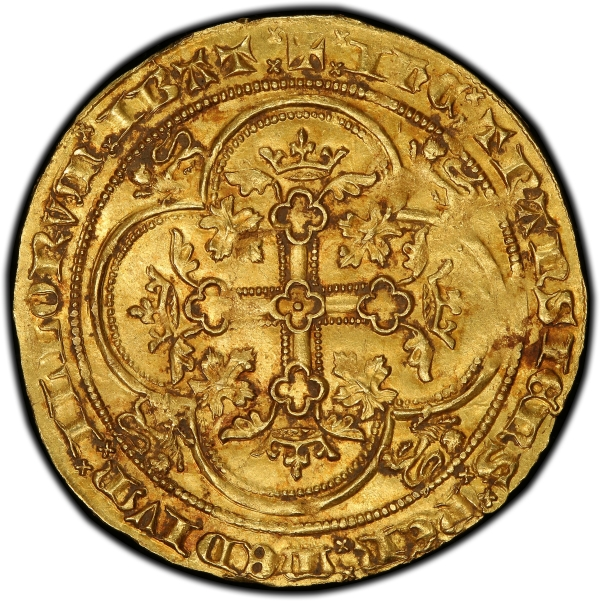
Reverse

The obverse of the coin shows the king enthroned beneath a canopy, with two leopards' heads at the sides; the legend is EDWR D GRA REX ANGL ⁊ FRANC DNS HIB ("Edward, by the Grace of God King of England and France, Lord of Ireland"). The reverse shows the royal cross within a quatrefoil, a leopard in each spandrel; the legend is IHC TRANSIENS PER MEDIUM ILLORUM IBAT ("But Jesus passing through their midst went his way", from Luke 4:30).

== Surviving coins ==
Only three examples of the coin are known. Two were discovered together on the banks of the River Tyne in 1857, and are now held by the British Museum. Another was discovered at an undisclosed location in the south of England in 2006 and was sold at auction for £460,000, then a record price for a British coin. The coin was subsequently loaned to the Fitzwilliam Museum, Cambridge, before changing hands in 2016 for an undisclosed seven-figure sum to a private collector in the United States.

A 2013 list included the coin as one of the most expensive in the world.
