= Noble (English coin) =

14th/15th-century English gold coin

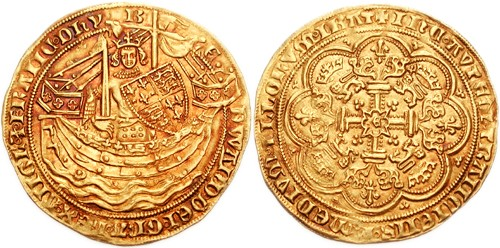
Edward III: AV noble. 1354–1355. Pre-treaty period, series E, London mint

The noble was the first English gold coin produced in quantity, introduced during the second coinage (1344–1346) of King Edward III. It was preceded by the gold penny and the florin, minted during the reign of King Henry III and the beginning of the reign of King Edward III; these saw little circulation. The derivatives of the noble (the half noble and quarter noble), on the other hand, were produced in quantity and were very popular.

The value of the coin was six shillings and eight pence (which could be written in various ways such as 6/8, 6s. 8d., or using Roman numerals vj s. viij d.). This was equivalent to 1/3 pound sterling. The weight was changed from issue to issue to maintain this value until 1464 when the value was increased. During the history of this denomination there are many variations of inscription, mintmark, and (to some extent) design.

== Origin ==
The coin was introduced during the second coinage (1344–1346) of King Edward III, when the coin weighed 138 1/2 grains (8.97 grams, about 2/7 troy ounce); during the king's third coinage (1346–1351) the weight of the coin was reduced to 128 1/2 grains (8.33 grams), while in his fourth coinage (1351–1377) it became even lighter, at 120 grains (7.78 grams; 1/4 troy oz). The diameter of the noble was 33–35 mm (1.3–1.4 in); the half noble was 25–26 mm (0.98–1.02 in) and the quarter noble 19–21 mm (0.75–0.83 in).

Edward III Second Coinage obverse legend: EDWAR DGRA REX ANGL Z FRANC DNS HYB ("Edward by the grace of God King of England and France Lord of Ireland"). (The Z shown here represents the Tironian "and" symbol: ⁊.)
Obverse design: The king, holding a sword and shield in a ship.
Reverse legend: IHC AUTEM TRANSIENS PER MEDIUM ILLORUM IBAT ("But Jesus passing through their midst went His way.")
Reverse design: 'L' in centre of a cross.

The image of the ship and the biblical text (from Luke 4:30) commemorate Edward's victory at the Battle of Sluys in 1340.

The Third Coinage design is the same as the Second Coinage, except for having an 'E' in the centre of the cross on the reverse.

During the Fourth Coinage, politics required changes in the inscriptions. Initially Edward retained his claim on the throne of France, but following the Treaty of Brétigny in 1360 this claim was dropped, and coins instead claim Aquitaine. In 1369 the treaty broke down and the claim on the throne of France was reinstated.

Pre-Treaty legend (obverse): EDWARD DEI GRA REX ANGL Z FRANC D HYB(E) ("Edward, by the grace of God King of England and France, Lord of Ireland"). Reverse legend: IHC AUTEM TRANSIENS PER MEDIUM ILLORUM IBAT (same as Second Coinage).

Transitional period (1361) and Treaty period (1361–1369) (obverse): EDWARD DEI GRA REX ANGL DNS HYB Z ACQ (Edward by the grace of God King of England Lord of Ireland and Aquitaine). Reverse legend: IHC AUTE TRANSIES P MEDIUM ILLORR IBAT ("But Jesus passing through their midst went His way") (many varieties exist and often whole words are missing).

Post-Treaty period (1369–1377) (obverse): EDWARD DEI G REX ANG Z FRA DNS HYB Z ACT (Edward by the grace of God King of England and France Lord of Ireland and Aquitaine). Reverse legend: same as 1361–1369.

== 1377 onwards ==
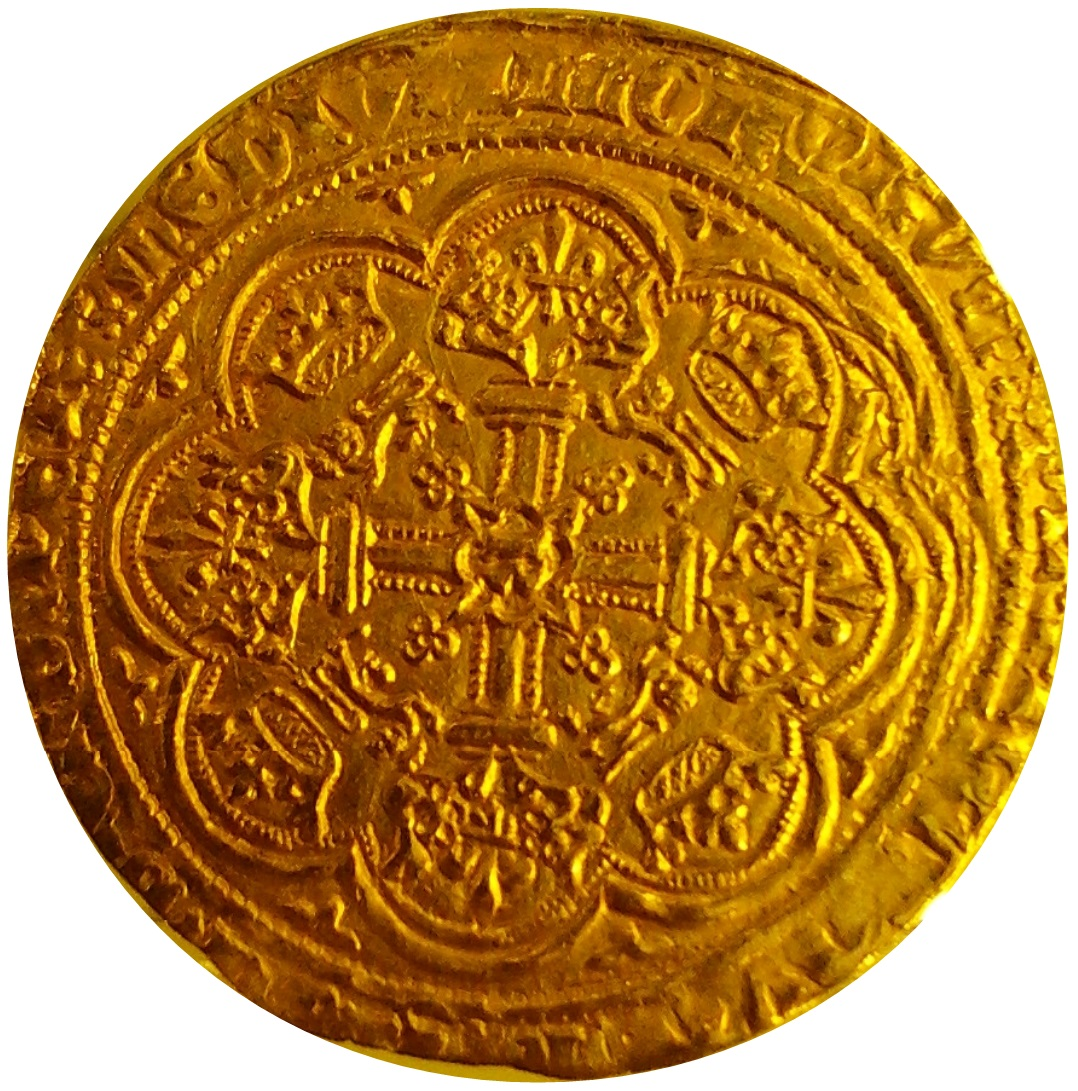
Noble of Richard II, 1377, London mint, National Museum in Warsaw. Ornate cross with lis at ends, R in center, surrounded by crowns and lions, saltire cross mintmark

During the reign of King Richard II (1377–99), nobles were struck at both the London and Calais mints, but today they are difficult to obtain. Coins minted at Calais can be distinguished because the ship has a flag at the stern.

Obverse legend: RICARD DI G REX ANGL Z FR DNS HIBS Z AQT (with minor variations in abbreviations) ("Richard by the grace of God King of England and France Lord of Ireland and Aquitaine"). Reverse legend: IHC AUTEM TRANSIENS PER MEDIUM ILLORR IBAT (many varieties exist) ("But Jesus passing through their midst went His way").

There exists a variant obverse: RICARD DI GR REX ANGL DNS HIBS Z AQT – note the omission of the French title.

Nobles produced during the reign of King Henry IV (1399–1413) are divided into the "Heavy Coinage" of 120 grains (7.78 grams) produced until 1412, and the "Light coinage" of 108 grains (7 grams, 9/40 troy oz) produced in 1412–13. Henrician nobles are a little difficult to distinguish because King Henry V and King Henry VI also produced nobles and at first glance they look very similar, but variations particularly in mintmarks can tell them apart – interested readers are advised to consult a good coin catalogue.

During the Heavy Coinage period, nobles were minted in both London and Calais, the Calais coins again being distinguished by the flag on the stern of the ship. During the Light Coinage period, nobles were only minted in London.

Obverse legend: HENRIC DI GRA REX ANGL Z FR DNS HIBS Z AQT (with many variations in abbreviations) ("Henry by the grace of God King of England and France Lord of Ireland and Aquitaine") . Reverse legend: IHC AUTEM TRANSIENS PER MEDIUM ILLORR IBAT ("But Jesus passing through their midst went His way").

== 1413 onwards ==
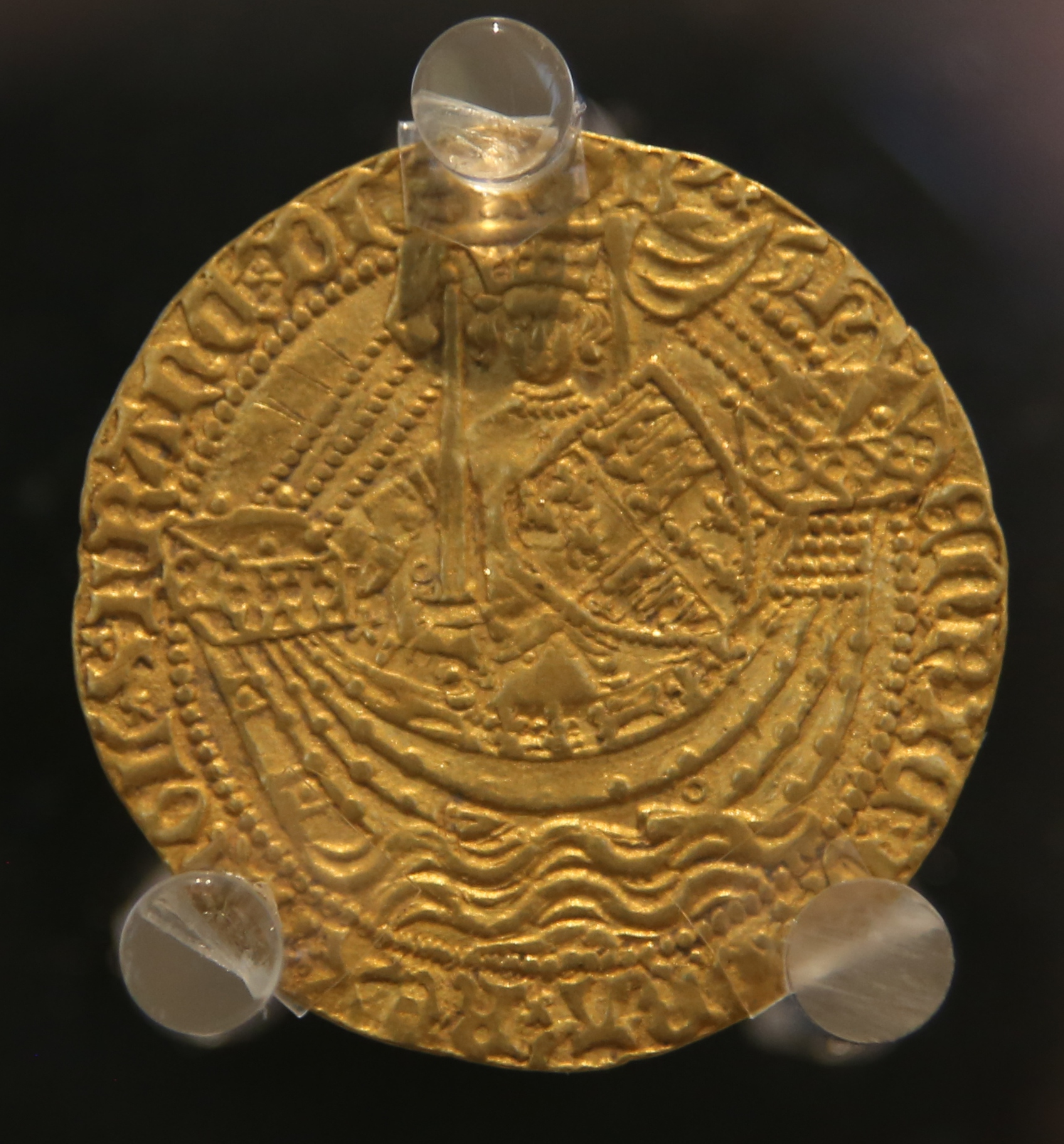
A noble of Henry V

Henry V's (1413–22) coins are very similar to those of his father, but there are about seven different varieties of design and style of lettering. The omission of the "and Aquitaine" title is another difference between the coins of Henry IV and V.

Obverse legend: HENRIC DI GRA REX ANGL Z FRANC DNS HYB (often abbreviated) ("Henry by the grace of God King of England and France Lord of the Irish"). Reverse legend: IHC AUTEM TRAN(S)IENS PER MEDIUM ILLORR IBAT ("But Jesus passing through their midst went His way").

Nobles were struck throughout Henry VI's first reign (1422–61), but a shortage of gold resulted in fewer coins being struck. There were a number of issues, from both the London and Calais mints, but towards the end of the period the coins were only struck in London.

Obverse legend: HENRIC DI GRA REX ANGL Z FRANC DNS HYB (often abbreviated) ("Henry by the grace of God King of England and France Lord of the Irish"). Reverse legend: IHC AUTEM TRANSIENS PER MEDIUM ILLORR IBAT ("But Jesus passing through their midst went His way").

In an episode of the British archaeological television series Time Team, a gold Noble was unearthed while excavating the drawbridge area of the moat of Codnor Castle. This helped to date the original castle construction and was believed to confirm the participation of the occupants in the Battle of Agincourt.

== 1430 onwards ==
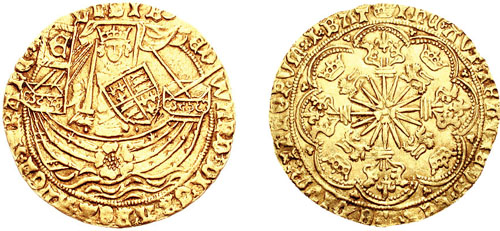
Edward IV: Ryal
Edward standing facing, holding sword and shield, in ship, E on banner at stern, rose on hull, quatrefoil of four pellets after FRAnC, pellet to lower left of shield	Rose over sun with fleurs, crowns, and lions; small trefoils in spandrels; quatrefoil of four pellets after ILLORVM, first S missing in TRAnSIEnS
AV Ryal Rose Noble (7.59 g, 12h). Light coinage, Type VIII, 1467–1468. London mint, mintmark: -/crown

The gold noble, which had hardly changed in style, value, or quality since the reign of Edward III, was minted for the last time during the first reign of King Edward IV (1461–1470). The price of gold rose from the 1430s onward, so gold coins were worth more in Europe than in England, which resulted in a gold shortage in England as coins were exported for profit. Only a small quantity of nobles were minted during Edward IV's Heavy Coinage period (1461–64), at London. Finally, in 1464 in an attempt to stop the coins drifting over to the continent, the value of all gold nobles was raised from six shillings and eight pence (6/8 or 80 pence) to eight shillings and four pence (8/4 or 100 pence), and a new coin, the "Rose Noble, or Royal" worth ten shillings and weighing 120 grains (7.8 grams) was introduced – however, it was unpopular and was discontinued after 1470. In contrast, a new coin worth six shillings and eight pence (the same as the original noble), the angel was introduced in 1464 and soon became a popular and important coin.

Obverse legend: EDWARD DI GRA REX ANGL Z FRANC DNS HYB ("Edward by the grace of God King of England and France Lord of Ireland"). Reverse legend: IHC AUTEM TRANSIENS PER MEDIUM ILLOR IBAT ("But Jesus passing through their midst went His way").

As the mark (equal to two nobles, or 13s 4d) was widely used during medieval times as a unit of account, many historical records show monetary amounts which are multiples of a noble.

As an example of recent "popular culture", in the children's novel The Big Six, the amount of 6s 8d is mentioned as being the standard solicitor's fee.

== Shakespeare ==
The noble is present in Shakespeare's theatre:

- Henry IV, Part 1

Hostess: Marry, my lord, there is a nobleman of the court at door would speak with you: he says he comes from your father.
Prince Henry: Give him as much as will make him a royal man, and send him back again to my mother.
The royal refers to the new noble, or royal, worth 10 shillings.

- Henry VI, Part 1:

Shepard:'Tis true, I gave a noble to the priest
The morn that I was wedded to her mother.

- Henry V:

Nym: I shall have my eight shillings I won of you at betting?
Pistol: A noble shalt thou have, and present pay;

- Richard III:

Gloucester: ...
That scarce, some two days since, were worth a noble.

- Much Ado About Nothing:

Benedick: ...noble, or not I for an angel;...

== See also ==
- List of British banknotes and coins
