= List of Belarusian football transfers winter 2025–26 =

This is a list of Belarusian football transfers in the 2025–26 winter transfer window by club. Only clubs of the 2026 Belarusian Premier League are included.

== Belarusian Premier League 2026 ==
=== Arsenal Dzerzhinsk ===
In:

No.	Pos.	Nation	Player
2	DF	BLR	Yegor Bozhko (on loan from Maxline Vitebsk)
9	FW	RUS	Ilya Vasin (on loan from (Russia) Fakel Voronezh)
10	MF	BLR	Sergey Sazonchik (from Slavia Mozyr)
17	MF	BLR	Pavel Kotlyarov (on loan from Slavia Mozyr)
18	MF	BLR	Daniel Volsky (on loan from Fortuna Minsk, previously on loan at (Russia) Zenit Saint Petersburg)
23	DF	BLR	Denis Polyakov (from Dynamo Brest)
26	MF	RUS	Vadim Tkachenko (from Vitebsk, previously on loan at Belshina Bobruisk)
31	DF	BLR	Andrey Zaleski (from Isloch Minsk Raion)
33	FW	BLR	Valery Gorbachik (from Vitebsk)
34	GK	BLR	Daniil Martinovich (from BATE Borisov)
90	FW	BLR	Dmitry Antilevsky (from Maxline Vitebsk)
95	MF	BLR	Ivan Vorobyov
99	FW	BLR	Ivan Tolkachyov (end of loan to Ostrovets)

Out:

No.	Pos.	Nation	Player
4	MF	SUI	Nikita Vlasenko (to (Croatia) Vukovar 1991)
5	DF	BLR	Roman Vegerya (to (Uzbekistan) Shurtan)
6	MF	RUS	Andrei Ishutin (to (Russia) Salyut Belgorod)
8	MF	ARM	Vadim Harutyunyan (end of loan from (Russia) Lokomotiv Moscow)
9	FW	BLR	Dmitry Vashkevich (to Slavia Mozyr)
10	MF	BLR	Valeriy Senko (to Slavia Mozyr)
14	DF	BLR	Matvey Mikhayrin (to Torpedo-BelAZ Zhodino)
18	DF	BLR	Aleksandr Mikhalenko (to (Kyrgyzstan) Asiagoal Bishkek)
19	FW	BLR	Aleksandr Frantsuzov (end of loan from (Russia) Lokomotiv Moscow)
27	MF	BLR	Maksim Gayevoy (to Torpedo-BelAZ Zhodino)
51	MF	BLR	Alyaksandr Skshynetski (retired)
63	MF	TJK	Fatkhullo Olimzoda (to (Tajikistan) Ravshan Kulob)
80	MF	RUS	Mikhail Shchetinin (to (Russia) Lokomotiv Moscow)
99	DF	RUS	Kirill Volkov (end of loan from (Russia) Lokomotiv Moscow)
—	FW	BLR	Ilya Gubarevich (to (Russia) Dynamo-2 Moscow, previously on loan at ABFF U-19)
—	DF	BLR	Stanislav Kazmerchuk (to (Russia) Akron Tolyatti, previously on loan at ABFF U-19)

=== Baranovichi ===
In:

No.	Pos.	Nation	Player
3	DF	RUS	Konstantin Shcherbakov
5	DF	RUS	Vladimir Fedotov
7	MF	RUS	Timur Pukhov (from Maxline Vitebsk)
8	MF	BLR	Vadim Balbukh (from Belshina Bobruisk)
12	GK	BLR	Daniil Shapko (from Dnepr Mogilev)
19	DF	BLR	Artem Bruy (from Osipovichi)
20	FW	BLR	Bogdan Gusev (from ABFF U-19)
22	FW	BLR	Stanislav Stefanovich (on loan from Fortuna Minsk, previously on loan at Unixlabs)
26	GK	BLR	Denis Shpakovsky (from Dinamo Minsk)
27	MF	BLR	Tigran Sarkisyan (from Unixlabs)
29	FW	BLR	Semen Penchuk (from Minsk, previously on loan)
33	DF	BLR	Kirill Muzychenko (on loan from Maxline Vitebsk)
34	FW	BLR	Artsyom Pyatrenka (from Dnepr Mogilev)
41	MF	BLR	Dmitry Volkovets (on loan from Dynamo Brest)
45	FW	KAZ	Aldiyar Altayev (from (Kazakhstan) SD Family)
98	DF	BLR	Matvey Svidinsky (from BATE Borisov)
—	DF	BLR	Artyom Krutko (end of loan to Slonim-2017)

Out:

No.	Pos.	Nation	Player
1	GK	BLR	Daniil Perov (to Molodechno)
5	FW	BLR	Arseny Zhukovsky (end of loan from Isloch Minsk Raion)
9	FW	BLR	Dmitry Galuza (to Niva Dolbizno)
11	FW	BLR	Vladlen Anikeyev (end of loan from Vitebsk)
12	MF	BLR	Yegor Mikhey (to Ostrovets)
14	DF	BLR	Ilya Kirko (end of loan from Neman Grodno)
18	MF	BLR	Marat Lukyanov (to Nadezhda Baranovichi Raion)
19	MF	BLR	Dmitry Nekrashevich (to Slutsk)
21	DF	BLR	Timofey Baranovsky
22	MF	BLR	Stanislav Atrashkevich (to Molodechno)
33	MF	BLR	Makar Litskevich (to Dnepr Mogilev)

=== BATE Borisov ===
In:

No.	Pos.	Nation	Player
3	DF	CMR	Christian Intsoen (from Smorgon)
5	DF	BLR	Maksim Sakuta (from ABFF U-19)
7	MF	CIV	Victorien Angban
17	MF	BLR	Anton Kavalyow (on loan from (Russia) Fakel Voronezh)
24	FW	BLR	Vladislav Yatskevich (from Ostrovets, previously on loan)
28	MF	BLR	Ivan Mikhnyuk (on loan from Slutsk)
30	FW	BLR	Anatoliy Yarmolich (from Osipovichi)
32	GK	BLR	Syarhey Chernik (from Slutsk)
42	DF	RUS	Andrey Zhurin (from (Russia) Kosmos Dolgoprudny)
52	MF	BLR	Yegor Kress (from Naftan Novopolotsk)
88	DF	BLR	Pavel Dubovsky (from Belshina Bobruisk)

Out:

No.	Pos.	Nation	Player
4	FW	BLR	Aleksandr Shvedchikov (to Belshina Bobruisk)
5	DF	BLR	Yegor Osipov
7	MF	BLR	Aleksandr Svirepa (to Isloch Minsk Raion)
11	FW	RUS	Nikolai Prudnikov (to (Kyrgyzstan) Asiagoal Bishkek)
15	DF	BLR	Pavel Pashevich (to Gomel)
18	DF	RUS	Nikita Nikonorov (to Belshina Bobruisk)
21	FW	BLR	Vadim Kiselyov (to Torpedo-BelAZ Zhodino)
24	MF	BLR	Vladislav Rusenchik (to Belshina Bobruisk)
27	MF	BLR	Roman Piletsky (to Dnepr Mogilev)
28	MF	BLR	Kirill Chernook (to Slavia Mozyr, previously on loan)
33	MF	BLR	Viktar Sotnikaw (to Gomel)
66	DF	BLR	Arseny Ageyev (end of loan from (Russia) Lokomotiv Moscow)
68	MF	BLR	Danila Zhulpa (to Torpedo-BelAZ Zhodino)
77	FW	BEL	Ibrahim Kargbo Jr. (to (Kosovo) Prishtina e Re)
81	GK	BLR	Daniil Martinovich (to Arsenal Dzerzhinsk)
98	DF	BLR	Matvey Svidinsky (to Baranovichi)
—	MF	BLR	Ilya Baranov (previously on loan at Volna Pinsk)
—	MF	BLR	Arseny Blotsky (on loan to Slutsk, previously on loan at Unixlabs)
—	MF	BLR	Zakhar Gitselev (to Dnepr Mogilev, previously on loan at Volna Pinsk)
—	GK	BLR	Uladzislaw Ihnatsyew (to Dnepr Mogilev, previously on loan at Minsk)
—	MF	BLR	Yaroslav Kulesh (on loan to Orsha)
—	FW	BLR	Maksim Kunsky (on loan to (Russia) Saturn Ramenskoye, previously from Osipovichi)
—	MF	BLR	Andrey Potapenko (to Dnepr Mogilev, previously on loan at Gomel)
—	MF	BLR	Ales Sakhonchik (on loan to Molodechno)
—	DF	BLR	Anatoliy Sannikov (to Polotsk-2019, previously on loan at Naftan Novopolotsk)
—	DF	BLR	Andrey Shkondin (on loan to Slutsk)

=== Belshina Bobruisk ===
In:

No.	Pos.	Nation	Player
2	DF	RUS	Nikita Nikonorov (from BATE Borisov)
8	MF	BLR	Vladislav Rusenchik (from BATE Borisov)
9	FW	BLR	Aleksandr Shvedchikov (from BATE Borisov)
11	FW	RUS	Timur Galimzyanov (from Molodechno)
14	DF	RUS	Vladislav Davydov (from Slavia Mozyr)
15	MF	BLR	Kirill Malykh (end of loan to Osipovichi)
18	FW	BLR	Mikita Nyakrasaw (from Lokomotiv Gomel)
25	GK	KAZ	Abdukhalil Makhmudov (from (Kazakhstan) AKAS)
27	MF	RUS	Nikita Rozmanov (from (Russia) Tver)
31	GK	BLR	Pavel Prishivalko (from Lokomotiv Gomel)
77	FW	BLR	Ivan Veras (from Orsha)

Out:

No.	Pos.	Nation	Player
7	FW	BLR	Arseniy Achapovskiy (to Gomel)
8	MF	BLR	Vadim Balbukh (to Baranovichi)
11	MF	BLR	Aleksey Chernodarov (end of loan from Orsha)
14	MF	BLR	Vladislav Drapeza (to Osipovichi)
18	MF	RUS	Vadim Tkachenko (end of loan from Vitebsk)
24	FW	BLR	Pavel Gorbach (to Smorgon)
35	GK	BLR	Ivan Frolov (end of loan from Dinamo Minsk)
77	MF	BLR	Artem Zimin (to Osipovichi)
78	DF	BLR	Vladislav Kovalevich (to Smorgon)
88	DF	BLR	Pavel Dubovsky (to BATE Borisov)
99	FW	BLR	Daniil Kulikov (on loan to Osipovichi)
—	MF	BLR	Dmitry Denisenko (to Osipovichi, previously on loan)

=== Dynamo Brest ===
In:

No.	Pos.	Nation	Player
1	GK	BLR	Maksim Belov (from Neman Grodno)
5	DF	BLR	Maksim Kovel (from (Kazakhstan) Zhetysu)
6	DF	BLR	Yegor Khralenkov (end of loan to Slutsk)
7	MF	MNE	Dušan Bakić (from (Russia) Torpedo Moscow)
8	MF	RUS	Aleksandr Lomakin (on loan from (Russia) Torpedo Moscow)
11	DF	BLR	Denis Levitsky (from Maxline Vitebsk)
15	DF	RUS	Maks Dziov (on loan from (Russia) Fakel Voronezh)
17	MF	BLR	Roman Gritskevich (from Slutsk)
19	MF	BLR	Denis Grechikho (from Dinamo Minsk)
20	MF	BLR	Mikhail Bondarenko (from Minsk)
25	FW	BLR	Vladislav Lozhkin (from Chernomorets Novorossiysk)
35	GK	BLR	Igor Malaschitskiy (from Shakhtyor Soligorsk, previously on loan at Torpedo-BelAZ Zhodino)
36	DF	BRA	Guilherme Guedes (from (Uzbekistan) Navbahor)
42	MF	BLR	Nikita Burak (end of loan to Slutsk)
44	MF	BLR	Aleksey Butarevich (from Maxline Vitebsk)

Out:

No.	Pos.	Nation	Player
4	MF	NGR	Adewale Oladoye
6	DF	BLR	Daniil Narchuk (on loan to Unixlabs)
7	MF	BLR	Artyom Bykov (to Torpedo-BelAZ Zhodino)
8	MF	BLR	Anton Shramchenko (to Isloch Minsk Raion)
10	MF	BLR	Dmitry Lisakovich (to Gomel)
11	MF	BLR	Denis R. Kovalevich (to Gomel)
14	MF	SRB	Filip Jović
15	DF	BLR	Maksim Kasarab (on loan to Dnepr Mogilev)
16	GK	BLR	Mikhail Kozakevich (to Dinamo Minsk)
17	MF	RUS	Igor Konovalov (to (Russia) Chernomorets Novorossiysk)
19	DF	BLR	Denis Polyakov (to Arsenal Dzerzhinsk)
25	MF	UZB	Sherzod Esanov (to (Uzbekistan) Bukhara)
44	DF	SLE	Abdoulie Jarjue Kabia (to (Georgia (country)) Samgurali Tskaltubo)
47	FW	BLR	Timofey Martynov (end of loan from (Russia) Orenburg)
49	GK	BLR	Artyom Karatay (end of loan from Dinamo Minsk)
62	FW	BLR	Mikhail Gordeychuk (to Neman Grodno)
91	GK	BLR	Dmitry Dudar
—	MF	BLR	Dmitry Volkovets (on loan to Baranovichi, previously from Minsk)
—	DF	BLR	Ilya Bogdanovich (to Smorgon, previously on loan)
—	MF	BLR	Dmitry Lesnyak (to Volna Pinsk, previously on loan)
—	GK	BLR	Danila Kashtelyan (to Niva Dolbizno)

=== Dinamo Minsk ===
In:

No.	Pos.	Nation	Player
2	DF	BLR	Matvey Dubatovka (end of loan to Slutsk)
3	DF	BLR	Maksim Shvyatsow (from (Russia) Rotor Volgograd)
8	MF	BLR	Aleksandr Selyava (from Torpedo-BelAZ Zhodino)
11	MF	KGZ	Gulzhigit Alykulov (from (Russia) Torpedo Moscow)
12	DF	BLR	Alyaksey Ivanow (from Slavia Mozyr)
13	MF	BLR	Vladislav Poloz (from Slavia Mozyr)
16	GK	BLR	Mikhail Kozakevich (from Dynamo Brest)
25	DF	CIV	Abdoul Aziz Touré (from (Kazakhstan) Kyzylzhar)
27	DF	BLR	Mikhail Aleksandrov (end of loan to Gomel)
33	DF	BLR	Sergey Karpovich (on loan from Maxline Vitebsk)
55	MF	BLR	Kirill Kaplenko (from (Russia) Spartak Kostroma)
78	MF	BLR	Artyom Sokolovsky (end of loan to Slutsk)
80	FW	CMR	Leonard Gweth (from Neman Grodno)

Out:

No.	Pos.	Nation	Player
1	GK	BLR	Artem Makavchik (retired)
4	DF	BLR	Aleksey Gavrilovich (on loan to Gomel)
6	MF	BLR	Maksim Myakish (to (Kazakhstan) Tobol)
8	MF	RUS	Ruslan Chobanov (end of loan from (Russia) Krasnodar)
9	FW	BRA	Fernando Victor (to (Brazil) Bahia de Feira)
18	MF	BLR	Denis Grechikho (to Dynamo Brest)
21	MF	BLR	Yevgeny Shevchenko (to Slavia Mozyr)
22	GK	RUS	Ivan Konovalov (to (Kazakhstan) Altai)
25	FW	BRA	Pedro Igor (to (Bulgaria) Botev Plovdiv)
31	GK	BLR	Denis Shpakovsky (to Baranovichi)
33	DF	GHA	Fard Ibrahim (to (Kazakhstan) Irtysh Pavlodar)
37	MF	BLR	Vladislav Krolik (to Torpedo-BelAZ Zhodino)
49	MF	BLR	Andrey Denisyuk (on loan to Dnepr Mogilev)
88	MF	BLR	Nikita Demchenko (to (Portugal) Vizela)
97	DF	BLR	Vasily Chernyavsky (on loan to Naftan Novopolotsk, previously on loan at Slutsk)
—	MF	BLR	Kirill Adamovich (on loan to Naftan Novopolotsk)
—	DF	BLR	Artyom Belous (to Volna Pinsk, previously on loan)
—	FW	BLR	Maksim Budko (to Torpedo-BelAZ Zhodino, previously on loan at Smorgon)
—	DF	BLR	Timur Dubovik (on loan to Molodechno, previously on loan at Smorgon)
—	GK	BLR	Ivan Frolov (on loan to Ostrovets, previously on loan at Belshina Bobruisk)
—	MF	BLR	Yegor Isachenko (to Ostrovets, previously on loan)
—	GK	BLR	Artyom Karatay (on loan to Gomel, previously on loan at Dynamo Brest)
—	DF	BLR	Kirill Kovsh (on loan to Volna Pinsk, previously on loan at Lokomotiv Gomel)
—	MF	BLR	Viktor Lisovsky (to SKA-1938 Minsk, previously on loan)
—	MF	BLR	Dmitry Nizhnik (to Volna Pinsk, previously on loan at Lokomotiv Gomel)
—	GK	BLR	Nikita Petrashko (on loan to Osipovichi)

=== Dnepr Mogilev ===
In:

No.	Pos.	Nation	Player
1	GK	BLR	Uladzislaw Ihnatsyew (from BATE Borisov, previously on loan at Minsk)
7	DF	BLR	Timofey Tkachyov (from ABFF U-19)
8	MF	BLR	Sergey Rusak (from Maxline Vitebsk)
9	MF	BLR	Erik Torosyan (from Minsk)
10	FW	BLR	Kirill Zabelin (from Minsk)
11	FW	BLR	Timofey Martynov (on loan from (Russia) Orenburg, previously on loan at Dynamo Brest)
12	DF	BLR	Nikita Bylinkin (from Slutsk)
14	DF	RUS	Yegor Burkhin (on loan from (Russia) Torpedo Moscow)
15	DF	BLR	Maksim Kasarab (on loan from Dynamo Brest)
17	MF	BLR	Andrey Potapenko (from BATE Borisov, previously on loan at Gomel)
18	DF	BLR	Andrey Shamruk (from Gomel)
21	FW	BLR	Yegor Karpitsky (on loan from (Russia) Krylia Sovetov Samara)
27	MF	BLR	Roman Piletsky (from BATE Borisov)
29	MF	BLR	Andrey Denisyuk (on loan from Dinamo Minsk)
33	MF	BLR	Zakhar Gitselev (from BATE Borisov, previously on loan at Volna Pinsk)
38	MF	BLR	Makar Litskevich (from Baranovichi)
55	MF	BLR	Nikita Krasnov (from (Russia) Legion Makhachkala)
77	GK	BLR	Dzmitry Hushchanka (from Vitebsk)
88	MF	BLR	Kirill Kirilenko (from Slavia Mozyr)
89	MF	ARM	Vadim Harutyunyan (from (Russia) Lokomotiv Moscow, previously on loan at Arsenal Dzerzhinsk)

Out:

No.	Pos.	Nation	Player
5	DF	RUS	Kirill Yelagin (to Smorgon)
8	MF	RUS	Aleksei Usanov (to (Russia) Cherepovets)
9	FW	RUS	Artyom Arkhipov (to Smorgon)
10	MF	BLR	Muzaffar Gurbanov (on loan to Naftan Novopolotsk)
11	FW	BLR	Vladislav Fedosov (to Slutsk)
12	GK	BLR	Daniil Shapko (to Baranovichi)
20	MF	BLR	Pavel Bordukov (to Orsha)
21	MF	BLR	Gleb Vershinin (to Bumprom Gomel)
22	DF	BLR	Ilya Boltrushevich
29	MF	BLR	Andrey Kabyshev (to Bumprom Gomel)
33	MF	BLR	Krasimir Kapov (to Molodechno)
34	FW	BLR	Artsyom Pyatrenka (to Baranovichi)
35	GK	BLR	Kirill Veydyger (end of loan from Neman Grodno)
77	MF	BLR	Gleb Zheleznikov (to Orsha)
91	MF	BLR	Artem Miroyevskiy (to Molodechno)
93	DF	BLR	Pavel Markaw (to Drut Belynichi)
—	MF	BLR	Vladislav Kabyshev (to Bumprom Gomel)
—	MF	BLR	Vladislav Puninsky (previously on loan at Orsha)

=== Gomel ===
In:

No.	Pos.	Nation	Player
4	DF	BLR	Aleksey Gavrilovich (on loan from Dinamo Minsk)
7	FW	BLR	Arseniy Achapovskiy (from Belshina Bobruisk)
9	MF	BLR	Kirill Leonovich (from Naftan Novopolotsk)
13	MF	BLR	Dmitry Lisakovich (from Dynamo Brest)
14	DF	BLR	Pavel Pashevich (from BATE Borisov)
21	MF	BLR	Denis R. Kovalevich (from Dynamo Brest)
23	MF	RUS	Kirill Danilin (on loan from (Russia) Akron Tolyatti, previously on loan at (Russia) Torpedo Moscow)
33	MF	BLR	Viktar Sotnikaw (from BATE Borisov)
43	DF	RUS	Damir Shaykhtdinov (from (Russia) Sokol Saratov)
49	GK	BLR	Artyom Karatay (on loan from Dinamo Minsk, previously on loan at Dynamo Brest)
—	MF	BLR	Stanislav Krivorot (from Lokomotiv Gomel)

Out:

No.	Pos.	Nation	Player
1	GK	BLR	Alyaksandr Nyachayew (to (Tajikistan) Khujand)
13	MF	BLR	Ilya Aleksiyevich (to Minsk)
14	MF	NGR	Raymond Adeola (to (Turkey) Serikspor)
15	DF	BLR	Andrey Shamruk (to Dnepr Mogilev)
20	MF	NGR	Lukuman Aliu
21	MF	BLR	Aleksey Antilevsky (to Slavia Mozyr)
22	DF	BLR	Kiryl Shawchenka (to Leskhoz Gomel)
23	MF	BLR	Andrey Potapenko (end of loan from BATE Borisov)
33	DF	UKR	Yevhen Chahovets (to Torpedo-BelAZ Zhodino)
56	DF	RUS	Sergei Loskutov (to (Russia) Krasnoye Znamya Noginsk)
63	FW	NIG	Abou Soufiane Waddou
68	DF	BLR	Mikhail Aleksandrov (end of loan from Dinamo Minsk)
—	FW	RUS	Ilya Grishchenko (to (Russia) Kaluga, previously on loan at Slutsk)

=== Isloch Minsk Raion ===
In:

No.	Pos.	Nation	Player
7	MF	BLR	Aleksandr Svirepa (from BATE Borisov)
8	MF	BLR	Anton Shramchenko (from Dynamo Brest)
9	FW	RUS	Bogdan Tsybrov (on loan from (Russia) Lokomotiv Moscow)
14	DF	BLR	Artyom Poluyanov (from ABFF U-19)
16	MF	BLR	Pavel Shevchenko (end of loan to Lokomotiv Gomel)
17	MF	GEO	Sergi Abramishvili (from (Georgia (country)) Orbi Tbilisi)
27	MF	ROU	Davide Popșa (from (Romania) CSM Olimpia Satu Mare)
33	DF	RUS	Ilya Skrobotov (from (Russia) Amkal Moscow)
70	FW	BLR	Alyaksandr Butsko (from Molodechno)
81	GK	RUS	Ivan Yerokhin (from (Russia) Veles Moscow)

Out:

No.	Pos.	Nation	Player
2	MF	LBR	David Tweh
8	MF	BLR	Aleksandr Guz (end of loan from (Russia) Torpedo Moscow)
11	MF	KAZ	Miras Kobeev
13	FW	BLR	Aleksandr Shestyuk (to (Serbia) Radnički Niš)
17	DF	BLR	Kiryl Radzivonaw (to Vitebsk)
18	DF	BLR	Kirill Gomanov (to Maxline Vitebsk)
22	MF	MDA	Vicu Bulmaga (to (Greece) Chania)
31	DF	BLR	Andrey Zaleski (to Arsenal Dzerzhinsk)
35	GK	BLR	Vladislav Drozd (on loan to Ostrovets)
55	DF	RUS	Vadim Konyukhov (to (Russia) Mashuk-KMV Pyatigorsk)
88	MF	RUS	Nikita Knyshev (to SKA-1938 Minsk)
—	FW	BLR	Rodion Medvedev (to Ostrovets, previously on loan at Volna Pinsk)
—	FW	BLR	Artyom Davidovich (to Ostrovets, previously on loan at Lokomotiv Gomel)
—	DF	BLR	Danila Garbuz (to Slonim-2017)
—	FW	BLR	Arseny Zhukovsky (to Slonim-2017, previously on loan to Baranovichi)

=== Maxline Vitebsk ===
In:

No.	Pos.	Nation	Player
3	DF	BLR	Nikita Baranok (from (Russia) Akron Tolyatti, previously on loan)
4	MF	NGR	Ode Abdullahi (from (Cyprus) Aris Limassol, previously on loan)
6	DF	BLR	Kirill Gomanov (from Isloch Minsk Raion)
7	FW	RUS	Timur Ivanov (from (Russia) Zenit-2 Saint Petersburg)
11	FW	JAM	Shamar Nicholson (on loan from (Mexico) Tijuana)
15	MF	BLR	Valery Bocherov (from (Russia) Ural Yekaterinburg)
22	DF	BLR	Yan Skibsky (from Vitebsk)
45	DF	BLR	Ilya Moskalenchik (on loan from (Russia) Arsenal Tula)
55	MF	BLR	Valery Gromyko (from (Kazakhstan) Kairat)
79	FW	MLI	Bassekou Diabaté (from (Norway) Stabæk)
80	MF	BLR	Artem Kontsevoy (from (Russia) Rodina Moscow)
—	MF	BLR	Frol Panarin (from Vitebsk)

Out:

No.	Pos.	Nation	Player
5	DF	BLR	Artur Chuduk (to Slutsk)
7	MF	RUS	Timur Pukhov (to Baranovichi)
8	MF	BLR	Sergey Rusak (to Dnepr Mogilev)
9	MF	BLR	Gleb Zherdev (to Slavia Mozyr)
10	MF	BLR	Oleg Nikiforenko (to (Serbia) Radnički Niš)
10	FW	ITA	Saliou Thioune (on loan to Naftan Novopolotsk, previously from (Malta) Hamrun Spartans)
11	DF	BLR	Denis Levitsky (to Dynamo Brest)
13	DF	BLR	Aleksey Zalesky (to Torpedo-BelAZ Zhodino)
19	FW	RUS	Dmitri Selivanov (on loan to Unixlabs)
22	FW	RUS	Abu-Said Eldarushev (end of loan from (Russia) Baltika Kaliningrad)
33	DF	BLR	Kirill Muzychenko (on loan to Baranovichi)
44	MF	BLR	Aleksey Butarevich (to Dynamo Brest, previously from Torpedo-BelAZ Zhodino)
66	DF	BLR	Sergey Karpovich (on loan to Dinamo Minsk)
70	MF	BRA	Rafael Juninho (end of loan from (Brazil) Corinthians)
77	MF	BLR	Alfred Mazurich (end of loan from Neman Grodno)
88	DF	BLR	Yegor Bozhko (on loan to Arsenal Dzerzhinsk)
90	FW	BLR	Dmitry Antilevsky (to Arsenal Dzerzhinsk)
—	DF	BLR	Daniil Kovalev (to Smorgon, previously on loan at Volna Pinsk)
—	MF	BLR	Vladimir Skomarovsky (to Niva Dolbizno, previously on loan at ABFF U-19)

=== Minsk ===
In:

No.	Pos.	Nation	Player
9	FW	SEN	Matar Dieye (from (Israel) Kiryat Yam)
13	MF	BLR	Ilya Aleksiyevich (from Gomel)
16	GK	RUS	Sergei Yeshchenko (from (Russia) Spartak Kostroma)
17	FW	BLR	Yahor Zubovich (from Neman Grodno)
19	DF	BLR	Konstantin Kuchinsky (from Neman Grodno)
20	DF	BLR	Prokhor Sheremet (from ABFF U-19)
66	DF	COL	Francisco Campo
80	MF	BLR	Aleksandr Ksenofontov (from Vitebsk)

Out:

No.	Pos.	Nation	Player
1	GK	BLR	Uladzislaw Ihnatsyew (end of loan from BATE Borisov)
4	DF	BLR	Vladislav Grekovich
5	DF	BLR	Eduard Zhevnerov (to Molodechno)
7	FW	BLR	Kirill Zabelin (to Dnepr Mogilev)
9	FW	BLR	Semen Penchuk (to Baranovichi, previously on loan)
10	FW	NGR	Charles Mark Ikechukwu
19	FW	BLR	Prokhor Struk (to (Russia) Rubin Kazan)
20	MF	BLR	Mikhail Bondarenko (to Dynamo Brest)
91	DF	BLR	Pavel Nazarenko (to Vitebsk)
—	MF	BLR	Dmitry Volkovets (to Dynamo Brest)
—	MF	BLR	Erik Torosyan (to Dnepr Mogilev)

=== Naftan Novopolotsk ===
In:

No.	Pos.	Nation	Player
6	MF	BLR	Kirill Adamovich (on loan from Dinamo Minsk)
7	MF	RUS	Shamil Gadzhiyev (on loan from (Russia) Dynamo Makhachkala)
8	FW	BLR	Dmitry Latykhov (from (Russia) Ural-2 Yekaterinburg)
9	MF	KAZ	Vadim Yakovlev (from (Kazakhstan) Atyrau)
10	MF	BLR	Yevgeny Zemko (from (Russia) KDV Tomsk)
16	GK	BLR	Aleksandr Titov
17	MF	BLR	Alyaksandr Aleksandrovich (from Dnepr Rogachev)
20	MF	RUS	Alimkhan Zaynivov (on loan from (Russia) Dynamo Makhachkala)
21	MF	BLR	Muzaffar Gurbanov (on loan from Dnepr Mogilev)
22	DF	BLR	Matvey Pritsker (on loan from Torpedo-BelAZ Zhodino)
24	MF	BLR	Ilya Seleznyov (from Orsha)
39	DF	RUS	Denis Fedorenko
42	DF	NGR	Jonathan John
50	MF	ZAM	Golden Mafwenta
70	FW	ITA	Saliou Thioune (on loan from Maxline Vitebsk, previously at (Malta) Hamrun Spartans)
97	DF	BLR	Vasily Chernyavsky (on loan from Dinamo Minsk, previously on loan at Slutsk)
—	DF	RUS	Abakar Akaev (from (Russia) Dynamo Makhachkala)

Out:

No.	Pos.	Nation	Player
1	GK	BLR	Artyom Denisenko (to Smorgon)
4	MF	BLR	Anton Susha (to Volna Pinsk)
7	MF	BLR	Mikhail Kolyadko (retired)
8	MF	BLR	Kirill Yermakovich (retired)
10	MF	UKR	Yevhen Protasov (to Vitebsk)
12	DF	BLR	Artem Zhvirblya (to Orsha)
17	FW	BLR	Albert Kopytich (to Mosty)
19	FW	TJK	Alisher Rakhimov (to (Tajikistan) Ravshan Kulob)
20	FW	GEO	Nugzar Spanderashvili
21	DF	BLR	Ignatiy Sidor (to Slutsk)
23	DF	COD	Mydo Kingu Yallet
31	FW	UZB	Ruslan Roziyev (to (Kyrgyzstan) Bishkek City)
44	DF	BLR	Anatoliy Sannikov (end of loan from BATE Borisov)
52	MF	BLR	Yegor Kress (to BATE Borisov)
66	MF	GUI	Yamoussa Camara
92	MF	BLR	Kirill Leonovich (to Gomel)
99	FW	BLR	Ivan Grudko (end of loan from Slavia Mozyr)
—	FW	BLR	Yegor Shedko (to Polotsk-2019, previously on loan at Ostrovets)
—	FW	BLR	Ivan Tsikhanaw (to Polotsk-2019, previously on loan at Orsha)

=== Neman Grodno ===
In:

No.	Pos.	Nation	Player
2	DF	BLR	Vladimir Tonkevich (end of loan to Smorgon)
4	DF	RUS	Andrei Vasilyev (from (Kazakhstan) Kyzylzhar)
7	MF	BLR	Alfred Mazurich (end of loan to Maxline Vitebsk)
14	DF	CIV	Sherif Jimoh
16	GK	BLR	Nikita Matysyuk (end of loan to ABFF U-19)
19	MF	BLR	Aleksey Dayneko (end of loan to Smorgon)
22	DF	BLR	Ilya Kirko (end of loan to Baranovichi)
23	MF	LBR	Tito Yormie Jr. (from Lida)
33	MF	MDA	Dan Spătaru (from (Moldova) Spartanii Sportul)
35	GK	BLR	Kirill Veydyger (end of loan to Dnepr Mogilev)
37	FW	RUS	Dmitry Radikovsky (on loan from (Russia) Lokomotiv Moscow, previously on loan at Vitebsk)
55	MF	BLR	Dzmitry Girs (from Vitebsk)
62	FW	BLR	Mikhail Gordeychuk (from Dynamo Brest)
—	MF	BLR	Sergey Guzarevich (end of loan to Lida)

Out:

No.	Pos.	Nation	Player
3	DF	BLR	Maksim Autko (on loan to Smorgon, previously from ABFF U-19)
7	MF	RUS	Yuri Klochkov (to (Uzbekistan) Shurtan)
10	FW	CMR	Leonard Gweth (to Dinamo Minsk)
11	MF	RUS	Yuri Gavrilov (to (Kyrgyzstan) Neftchi Kochkor-Ata)
12	GK	BLR	Maksim Belov (to Dynamo Brest)
17	FW	BLR	Yahor Zubovich (to Minsk)
19	DF	BLR	Konstantin Kuchinsky (to Minsk)
22	GK	BLR	Nikita Robak (on loan to Slutsk)
27	DF	KGZ	Amantur Shamurzayev (to (Kyrgyzstan) Uzgen)
30	MF	ALB	Valon Ahmedi (to (Kyrgyzstan) Bishkek City)
31	MF	BLR	Timur Minets (on loan to Osipovichi)
33	MF	CAF	Isaac Ngoma
44	MF	BLR	Ivan Kontsevoy (on loan to Lida)
46	DF	BLR	Aleksey Legchilin (to Lida)
59	FW	BLR	Artyom Devyaten (on loan to Smorgon)
—	DF	BLR	Maksim Katsynel (on loan to Lida, previously on loan at Lokomotiv Gomel)
—	MF	BLR	Oleg Petrovsky (on loan to Osipovichi)
—	MF	BLR	Marat Vasilkevich (on loan to Slutsk, previously on loan at Lida)
—	FW	BLR	Sergey Zhurnevich (on loan to Lida)

=== Slavia Mozyr ===
In:

No.	Pos.	Nation	Player
2	DF	BLR	Arseny Ageyev (on loan from (Russia) Lokomotiv Moscow, previously on loan at BATE Borisov)
3	DF	CMR	Ricky Ngatchou (from (Morocco) Racing de Casablanca)
4	DF	RUS	Ilya Kalachyov (from (Russia) Spartak Kostroma)
7	MF	BLR	Gleb Zherdev (from Maxline Vitebsk)
9	MF	BLR	Valeriy Senko (from Arsenal Dzerzhinsk)
11	MF	BLR	Aleksey Antilevsky (from Gomel)
15	FW	BLR	Dmitry Vashkevich (from Arsenal Dzerzhinsk)
16	GK	BLR	Yevgeny Abramovich (from Torpedo-BelAZ Zhodino)
17	MF	BLR	Kirill Chernook (from BATE Borisov, previously on loan)
19	MF	BLR	Aleksandr Derzhinsky (from ABFF U-19)
20	FW	BLR	Ilya Verenich (from ABFF U-19)
21	MF	BLR	Yevgeny Shevchenko (from Dinamo Minsk)

Out:

No.	Pos.	Nation	Player
3	DF	RUS	Vladislav Davydov (to Belshina Bobruisk)
4	DF	BLR	Daniil Prudnik (on loan to Ostrovets)
7	MF	BLR	Mikalay Ivanow (to (Uzbekistan) Lokomotiv Tashkent)
9	MF	UKR	Oleksandr Batishchev (to Torpedo-BelAZ Zhodino)
11	FW	RUS	Ivan Gulko (end of loan from (Russia) Orenburg)
12	DF	BLR	Alyaksey Ivanow (to Dinamo Minsk)
13	MF	BLR	Vladislav Poloz (to Dinamo Minsk)
14	MF	BLR	Sergey Sazonchik (to Arsenal Dzerzhinsk)
19	MF	BLR	Pavel Kotlyarov (on loan to Arsenal Dzerzhinsk)
21	MF	BLR	Kirill Kirilenko (to Dnepr Mogilev)
33	DF	BLR	Yaroslav Makushinsky (to Vitebsk)
41	GK	BLR	Maksim Plotnikov (to (Kazakhstan) Zhenis)
—	MF	BLR	Valentin Bondarenko (on loan to Niva Dolbizno)
—	FW	BLR	Ivan Grudko (on loan to Bumprom Gomel, previously on loan at Naftan Novopolotsk)
—	MF	KGZ	Ermek Kenzhebayev (to (Kyrgyzstan) Alga Bishkek, previously on loan)
—	MF	BLR	Daniil Tsyk (on loan to Ostrovets)
—	FW	BLR	Nikita Yakimovich (on loan to Ostrovets)

=== Torpedo-BelAZ Zhodino ===
In:

No.	Pos.	Nation	Player
1	GK	BLR	Sergey Ignatovich (from (Kazakhstan) Zhenis)
2	MF	CIV	Mohamed Lamine Bamba (from Smorgon)
3	DF	UKR	Yevhen Chahovets (from Gomel)
4	DF	BLR	Vladimir Manayev (end of loan from Lida)
5	DF	BLR	Arseny Stanul (from ABFF U-19)
7	MF	BLR	Artyom Bykov (from Dynamo Brest)
8	FW	BLR	Maksim Budko (from Dinamo Minsk, previously on loan at Smorgon)
9	MF	UKR	Oleksandr Batishchev (from Slavia Mozyr)
10	FW	BLR	Vitaly Lisakovich (from (Slovenia) Celje)
13	DF	BLR	Aleksey Zalesky (from Maxline Vitebsk)
16	FW	NGR	Nnaji Agbo (from (Nigeria) Final Touch)
17	MF	BLR	Vladislav Krolik (from Dinamo Minsk)
20	DF	BLR	Grigoriy Martyanov (end of loan to Slutsk)
21	FW	BLR	Vadim Kiselyov (from BATE Borisov)
27	MF	BLR	Maksim Gayevoy (from Arsenal Dzerzhinsk)
47	MF	BLR	Vladislav Nalivayko (from ABFF U-19)
68	MF	BLR	Danila Zhulpa (from BATE Borisov)
88	DF	BLR	Matvey Mikhayrin (from Arsenal Dzerzhinsk)
89	FW	BLR	Aleksandr Frantsuzov (on loan from (Russia) Lokomotiv Moscow, previously on loan at Arsenal Dzerzhinsk)
—	FW	BLR	Nikita Matusevich (from Sputnik Smolevichi)

Out:

No.	Pos.	Nation	Player
1	GK	BLR	Yevgeny Abramovich (to Slavia Mozyr)
5	DF	BLR	Ihar Burko (to Miory)
7	MF	MLI	Mamadou Camara (end of loan from (Russia) Torpedo Moscow)
8	MF	BLR	Aleksandr Selyava (to Dinamo Minsk)
10	MF	KGZ	Alimardon Shukurov (to (Kyrgyzstan) Muras United)
13	MF	BLR	Vladislav Klimovich (to (Kazakhstan) Irtysh Pavlodar)
14	MF	TKM	Teýmur Çaryýew (to (Kyrgyzstan) Bars Issyk-Kul)
15	FW	BLR	Maksim Skavysh (retired)
17	MF	BLR	Pavel Sedko (to (Kazakhstan) Irtysh Pavlodar)
18	MF	BLR	Dzmitry Baradzin (to (Kazakhstan) Okzhetpes)
23	FW	BLR	Ilya Vasilevich (to (Moldova) Zimbru Chișinău)
27	DF	BLR	Danila Nechayev (to (Kazakhstan) Irtysh Pavlodar)
35	GK	BLR	Igor Malaschitskiy (end of loan from Shakhtyor Soligorsk)
44	MF	BLR	Aleksey Butarevich (to Maxline Vitebsk)
66	DF	BLR	Sergey Politevich (retired)
72	FW	BLR	Roman Zheleznyi (on loan to Lida)
88	DF	RUS	Kirill Glushchenkov (end of loan from (Russia) Pari Nizhny Novgorod)
—	DF	BLR	Eduard Korostelyov (on loan to Lida)
—	MF	BLR	Yegor Mychelkin (to Smorgon, previously on loan)
—	DF	BLR	Matvey Pritsker (on loan to Naftan Novopolotsk)
—	MF	BLR	Ivan Sivkov (to Smorgon)
—	DF	BLR	Matvey Sokolovsky (on loan to Molodechno, previously on loan at Ostrovets)

=== Vitebsk ===
In:

No.	Pos.	Nation	Player
6	DF	BLR	Kiryl Radzivonaw (from Isloch Minsk Raion)
8	MF	BLR	Aleksandr Anufriyev (from Slutsk)
10	MF	UKR	Yevhen Protasov (from Naftan Novopolotsk)
18	FW	BLR	Vladlen Anikeyev (end of loan to Baranovichi)
21	FW	BLR	Aleksandr Burnos (from Lida)
33	DF	BLR	Yaroslav Makushinsky (from Slavia Mozyr)
50	GK	RUS	Nikita Goylo (on loan from Zenit Saint Petersburg)
77	FW	RUS	Roman Minayev (from (Russia) Salyut Belgorod)
86	MF	CRO	Marin Žgomba (from (Croatia) Istra 1961)
91	DF	BLR	Pavel Nazarenko (from Minsk)
—	FW	BLR	Vladislav Pulkach (end of loan to ABFF U-19)

Out:

No.	Pos.	Nation	Player
1	GK	BLR	Dzmitry Hushchanka (to Dnepr Mogilev)
3	DF	TKM	Vepa Jumayev (to (Uzbekistan) Aral)
4	FW	BLR	Valery Gorbachik (to Arsenal Dzerzhinsk)
18	DF	BLR	Yan Skibsky (to Maxline Vitebsk)
19	FW	BLR	Nikita Vekhtev (on loan to Orsha)
24	DF	CMR	Eguedegue Magloire (to (Moldova) Sheriff Tiraspol)
25	MF	RUS	Vadim Tkachenko (to Arsenal Dzerzhinsk, previously on loan at Belshina Bobruisk)
28	DF	BLR	Kirill Yankovskiy (to Soligorsk)
37	FW	RUS	Dmitry Radikovsky (end of loan from (Russia) Lokomotiv Moscow)
55	MF	BLR	Dzmitry Girs (to Neman Grodno)
80	MF	BLR	Aleksandr Ksenofontov (to Minsk)
—	MF	BLR	Frol Panarin (to Maxline Vitebsk)
