= 2017 King's Cup squads =

The 2017 King's Cup was an international football tournament held in Thailand from 14 to 16 July 2017. The 4 national teams involved in the tournament were required to register a squad of 23 players.

Players marked (c) were named as captain for their national squad. Number of caps counts until the start of the tournament, including all FIFA-recognized pre-tournament friendlies. Player's age is their age on the opening day of the tournament.

== Belarus ==
Coach: Igor Kriushenko

The following 22 players were called up for the 2017 King's Cup on 10 July 2017.

No.	Pos.	Player	Date of birth (age)	Caps	Goals	Club
1	GK	Dmitry Dudar	8 November 1991 (aged 25)	0	0	(Football Federation of Belarus) Slutsk
12	GK	Vladislav Vasilyuchek	28 March 1994 (aged 23)	0	0	(Football Federation of Belarus) Gorodeya
22	GK	Maksim Shishlov	17 February 1996 (aged 21)	0	0	(Football Federation of Belarus) Neman Grodno
13	DF	Aleksandr Pavlovets	13 August 1996 (aged 20)	2	0	(Football Federation of Belarus) Torpedo-BelAZ Zhodino
21	DF	Stanislav Sazonovich	6 March 1992 (aged 25)	0	0	(Football Federation of Belarus) Gomel
18	DF	Nikita Naumov	15 November 1989 (aged 27)	0	0	(Football Federation of Belarus) Vitebsk
4	DF	Artsyom Skitaw	21 January 1991 (aged 26)	0	0	(Football Federation of Belarus) Vitebsk
17	DF	Andrey Zaleski	20 January 1991 (aged 26)	0	0	(Football Federation of Belarus) Slutsk
5	DF	Yegor Khvalko	18 February 1997 (aged 20)	0	0	(Football Federation of Belarus) Neman Grodno
16	DF	Kiryl Pyachenin	18 March 1997 (aged 20)	0	0	(Football Federation of Belarus) Orsha
2	DF	Yevgeniy Klopotskiy	12 August 1993 (aged 23)	0	0	(Football Federation of Belarus) Torpedo-BelAZ Zhodino
3	DF	Dzmitry Zinovich	29 March 1995 (aged 22)	0	0	(Football Federation of Belarus) Minsk
7	MF	Alyaksandr Katlyaraw	30 January 1993 (aged 24)	0	0	(Football Federation of Belarus) Slavia Mozyr
11	MF	Vladislav Klimovich	12 June 1996 (aged 21)	0	0	(Football Federation of Belarus) Neman Grodno
19	MF	Dmitriy Bessmertny	3 January 1997 (aged 20)	0	0	(Football Federation of Belarus) Minsk
14	MF	Oleg Yevdokimov	25 February 1994 (aged 23)	1	0	(Football Federation of Belarus) Minsk
15	MF	Artsyom Salavey	1 November 1990 (aged 26)	0	0	(Football Federation of Belarus) Vitebsk
6	MF	Mikhail Babichev	2 February 1995 (aged 22)	0	0	(Football Federation of Belarus) Vitebsk
20	MF	Zakhar Volkov	12 August 1997 (aged 19)	0	0	(Football Federation of Belarus) Naftan Novopolotsk
10	FW	Yevgeniy Shevchenko	6 June 1996 (aged 21)	0	0	(Football Federation of Belarus) Minsk
9	FW	Dmitry Antilevsky	12 June 1997 (aged 20)	0	0	(Football Federation of Belarus) Dnepr Mogilev
8	FW	Pavel Savitski (Captain)	12 July 1994 (aged 23)	10	4	(Football Federation of Belarus) Neman Grodno

== Burkina Faso ==
Coach: Paulo Duarte

The following 22 players were called up for the 2017 King's Cup.

No.	Pos.	Player	Date of birth (age)	Caps	Goals	Club
16	GK	Aboubacar Sawadogo (Captain)	10 August 1989 (aged 27)	3	0	(Burkinabé Football Federation) RC Kadiogo
1	GK	Aimé Zongo	28 September 1988 (aged 28)	1	0	(Burkinabé Football Federation) Étoile Filante
15	DF	Armand Ouédraogo		4	0	(Burkinabé Football Federation) US Ouagadougou
12	DF	Issouf Sosso	11 August 1996 (aged 20)	0	0	(Burkinabé Football Federation) US Ouagadougou
17	DF	Edmond Tapsoba	2 February 1999 (aged 18)	3	0	(Burkinabé Football Federation) US Ouagadougou
14	DF	Yaya Sanou	29 December 1993 (aged 23)	1	0	(Burkinabé Football Federation) ASF Bobo Dioulasso
5	DF	Fousseyni Béao	6 July 1994 (aged 23)	4	0	(Burkinabé Football Federation) RC Bobo Dioulasso
10	DF	Ismaël Zagrè	21 December 1992 (aged 24)	1	0	(Burkinabé Football Federation) KOZAF
7	DF	Ismaël Karambiri		0	0	(Burkinabé Football Federation)
3	DF	Jean Noël Lingani	12 December 1988 (aged 28)	0	0	(Burkinabé Football Federation)
11	MF	Souleymane Tapsoba		0	0	(Burkinabé Football Federation)
6	MF	Ousmane Sylla	30 December 1990 (aged 26)	4	0	(Burkinabé Football Federation) RC Kadiogo
13	MF	N'Bia Camara		0	0	(Burkinabé Football Federation)
19	MF	Aliou Chitou		0	0	(Burkinabé Football Federation)
8	MF	Bagbema Barro		3	0	(Burkinabé Football Federation) Salitas Ouagadougou
4	FW	Mohamed Ouattara	28 December 1984 (aged 32)	0	0	(Swiss Football Association) CS Interstar
18	FW	Adama Barro	3 September 1996 (aged 20)	0	0	(Burkinabé Football Federation) Rahimo
9	FW	Ilasse Sawadogo		0	0	(Burkinabé Football Federation)
2	FW	Lassina Traoré	12 January 2001 (aged 16)	2	3	(Burkinabé Football Federation) Rahimo
20	FW	Arnaud Julius		0	0	(Burkinabé Football Federation)

== North Korea ==
Coach: Jørn Andersen

The following 22 players were called up for the 2017 King's Cup.

No.	Pos.	Player	Date of birth (age)	Caps	Goals	Club
1	GK	Ri Myong-guk (Captain)	9 September 1986 (aged 30)	86	0	(DPR Korea Football Association) Pyongyang City
22	GK	Ri Kwang-il	13 April 1988 (aged 29)	3	0	(DPR Korea Football Association) April 25
23	GK	Kim Kwang-chol	2 June 1993 (aged 24)	0	0	(DPR Korea Football Association)
2	DF	Sim Hyon-jin	1 January 1991 (aged 26)	25	1	(DPR Korea Football Association) Sobaeksu
6	DF	Kang Kuk-chol	1 June 1990 (aged 27)	7	0	(DPR Korea Football Association) Pyongyang City
3	DF	Jang Kuk-chol	2 April 1994 (aged 23)	33	3	(DPR Korea Football Association) Hwaebul
7	DF	Kim Chol-bom	16 July 1994 (aged 23)	1	0	(DPR Korea Football Association) Sobaeksu
18	DF	Ri Yong-chol	8 January 1991 (aged 26)	11	0	(DPR Korea Football Association) Kyonggongop
17	MF	Myong Cha-hyon	20 March 1990 (aged 27)	3	2	(DPR Korea Football Association) April 25
21	MF	Yun Il-gwang	1 April 1993 (aged 24)	1	0	(DPR Korea Football Association) Chadongcha
10	MF	Ju Jong-chol	12 September 1990 (aged 26)	1	0	(DPR Korea Football Association) Amrokkang
4	MF	Pak Myong-song	31 March 1994 (aged 23)	2	0	(DPR Korea Football Association) Sobaeksu
5	MF	Ri Kum-chol	9 December 1991 (aged 25)	2	0	(DPR Korea Football Association)
12	MF	So Kyong-jin	8 January 1994 (aged 23)	9	0	(DPR Korea Football Association) Sobaeksu
14	MF	Ri Sang-chol	26 December 1990 (aged 26)	9	0	(DPR Korea Football Association) Amrokgang
19	MF	So Hyon-uk	17 April 1992 (aged 25)	28	2	(DPR Korea Football Association) April 25
9	FW	Pak Song-chol	24 September 1987 (aged 29)	39	11	(DPR Korea Football Association) Rimyongsu
20	FW	Song Kum-il	10 May 1994 (aged 23)	0	0	(DPR Korea Football Association) Rimyongsu
11	FW	Choe Ju-song	27 January 1996 (aged 21)	0	0	(DPR Korea Football Association) Amrokkang
16	FW	Jo Kwang	5 August 1994 (aged 22)	1	0	(DPR Korea Football Association) Sobaeksu
8	FW	Rim Kwang-hyok	5 August 1992 (aged 24)	1	0	(DPR Korea Football Association) Kigwancha
13	FW	Kim Ju-song	15 October 1993 (aged 23)	5	0	(DPR Korea Football Association) April 25

== Thailand ==
Coach: Milovan Rajevac

The following 23 players were called up for the 2017 King's Cup on 13 July 2017.

No.	Pos.	Player	Date of birth (age)	Caps	Goals	Club
20	GK	Sinthaweechai Hathairattanakool	23 March 1982 (aged 35)	84	0	(Football Association of Thailand) Suphanburi
1	GK	Kawin Thamsatchanan (Captain)	26 January 1990 (aged 27)	59	0	(Football Association of Thailand) Muangthong United
23	GK	Siwarak Tedsungnoen	20 April 1984 (aged 33)	10	0	(Football Association of Thailand) Buriram United
3	DF	Theerathon Bunmathan	6 February 1990 (aged 27)	44	5	(Football Association of Thailand) Muangthong United
2	DF	Peerapat Notchaiya	4 February 1993 (aged 24)	21	1	(Football Association of Thailand) Muangthong United
5	DF	Adison Promrak	21 October 1993 (aged 23)	19	0	(Football Association of Thailand) Muangthong United
18	DF	Putthinan Wannasri	5 September 1992 (aged 24)	5	0	(Football Association of Thailand) Bangkok United
4	DF	Chalermpong Kerdkaew	7 November 1986 (aged 30)	2	0	(Football Association of Thailand) Nakhon Ratchasima
13	DF	Pansa Hemviboon	8 July 1990 (aged 27)	2	0	(Football Association of Thailand) Buriram United
16	DF	Nattapon Malapun	10 January 1994 (aged 23)	1	0	(Football Association of Thailand) Chonburi
12	DF	Philip Roller	10 June 1994 (aged 23)	0	0	(Football Association of Thailand) Ratchaburi Mitr Phol
17	MF	Tanaboon Kesarat	21 September 1993 (aged 23)	32	1	(Football Association of Thailand) Chiangrai United
21	MF	Pokklaw Anan	4 March 1991 (aged 26)	30	4	(Football Association of Thailand) Bangkok United
11	MF	Mongkol Tossakrai	9 May 1987 (aged 30)	29	8	(Football Association of Thailand) Pattaya United
10	MF	Sanrawat Dechmitr	3 August 1989 (aged 27)	15	0	(Football Association of Thailand) Bangkok United
8	MF	Thitipan Puangchan	1 September 1993 (aged 23)	9	2	(Football Association of Thailand) Chiangrai United
6	MF	Wattana Playnum	19 July 1989 (aged 27)	2	0	(Football Association of Thailand) Muangthong United
15	MF	Bodin Phala	20 December 1994 (aged 22)	2	0	(Football Association of Thailand) Buriram United
7	MF	Chutipol Thongthae	23 January 1991 (aged 26)	1	0	(Football Association of Thailand) Ratchaburi Mitr Phol
19	MF	Peeradon Chamratsamee	15 September 1992 (aged 24)	1	0	(Football Association of Thailand) Pattaya United
14	FW	Teeratep Winothai	16 February 1985 (aged 32)	51	15	(Football Association of Thailand) Bangkok United
9	FW	Adisak Kraisorn	1 February 1991 (aged 26)	23	8	(Football Association of Thailand) Muangthong United
22	FW	Siroch Chatthong	8 December 1992 (aged 24)	16	3	(Football Association of Thailand) Muangthong United
