= Krivosheyev =

Krivosheyev, feminine: Krivosheyeva is a Russian patronymic surname derived from the nickname "krivoshey", "crooked-necked". Notable people with the surname include:

- Andrey Krivosheyev
- Dmitry Krivosheyev
- Grigori F. Krivosheev (1929–2019), Russian military historian
- Natalia Krivoshein de Canese (1926-2019), Paraguayan philologist
- Olga Krivosheyeva (born 1961), Soviet volleyball player
- Yefimiya Krivosheyeva (1867-1936), Erzya writer and folk storyteller

== See also ==
- Krivoshey
- Krivoshein
