= Dmitry Kaplunov =

Belarusian footballer

Personal information
- Date of birth: 21 April 1994 (age 32)
- Place of birth: Baranovichi, Brest Oblast, Belarus
- Height: 1.78 m (5 ft 10 in)
- Position: Defender

Team information
- Current team: Bumprom Gomel
- Number: 5

Youth career
- 2010–2011: DYuSSh Baranovichi

Senior career*
Years	Team	Apps	(Gls)
2011–2016	Baranovichi	98	(1)
2017–2018	Luch Minsk	47	(4)
2019	Dnyapro Mogilev	0	(0)
2019	→ Granit Mikashevichi (loan)	28	(2)
2020	Gomel	19	(0)
2021–2022	Arsenal Dzerzhinsk	50	(1)
2023–2024	Lokomotiv Gomel	60	(2)
2025–	Bumprom Gomel	38	(1)
- * Club domestic league appearances and goals as of 6 July 2026

Dmitry Kaplunov (Belarusian: Дзмітрый Каплуноў; Russian: Дмитрий Каплунов; born 21 April 1994) is a Belarusian professional footballer who plays for Bumprom Gomel.
