= Vladimir Pyatigorets =

Belarusian footballer

Personal information
- Date of birth: 12 April 1990 (age 36)
- Place of birth: Minsk, Belarusian SSR
- Height: 1.86 m (6 ft 1 in)
- Position: Goalkeeper

Team information
- Current team: Kolos Chervyen
- Number: 30

Youth career
- 2008–2010: Partizan Minsk

Senior career*
Years	Team	Apps	(Gls)
2010–2011	Partizan Minsk	43	(0)
2012	Gorodeya	12	(0)
2013	Torpedo-BelAZ Zhodino	1	(0)
2014–2015	Gorodeya	6	(0)
2016–2018	Torpedo Minsk	37	(0)
2019	Belshina Bobruisk	14	(0)
2020–2021	Sputnik Rechitsa	25	(0)
2021	Arsenal Dzerzhinsk	12	(0)
2022	Dnepr Mogilev	7	(0)
2023	Minsk	5	(0)
2024	Bumprom Gomel	3	(0)
2024–	Kolos Chervyen		

International career
2010	Belarus U21	3	(0)
- * Club domestic league appearances and goals as of 17 July 2024

Vladimir Pyatigorets (Belarusian: Уладзiмiр Пяцiгорец; Russian: Владимир Пятигорец; born 12 April 1990) is a Belarusian professional footballer who plays for Kolos Chervyen.
