= Frol =

Frol may refer to:

== Places ==
- Frol Municipality, a former municipality in the old Nord-Trøndelag county, Norway
- Frol, Vologda Oblast, a village in Pertsevskoye Rural Settlement, Gryazovetsky District, Vologda Oblast, Russia

== People ==
- Frol Kozlov, a Soviet politician
- Frol Panarin, a Belarusian footballer who plays for Vitebsk
- Frane Frol, a lawyer and Croatian and Yugoslavian politician
