= Antilevsky =

Antilevsky (Belarusian: Анцілеўскі, Russian: Антилевский) is a surname of Slavic-language origin. Notable people with this surname include:

- Aleksey Antilevsky (born 2002), Belarusian footballer
- Dmitry Antilevsky (born 1997), Belarusian footballer
