= Ivan Zhostkin =

Belarusian footballer

Personal information
- Date of birth: 8 May 1991 (age 35)
- Place of birth: Gomel, Belarus
- Height: 1.78 m (5 ft 10 in)
- Position: Midfielder

Team information
- Current team: Bumprom Gomel
- Number: 8

Youth career
- 2008–2010: Gomel

Senior career*
Years	Team	Apps	(Gls)
2010–2011	Gomel	0	(0)
2010	→ Gomel-2	30	(2)
2011	→ DSK Gomel (loan)	25	(0)
2012	Khimik Svetlogorsk	26	(0)
2013	Vedrich-97 Rechitsa	22	(0)
2014–2016	Gomelzheldortrans	65	(6)
2016	Belshina Bobruisk	13	(0)
2017–2020	Gomel	84	(6)
2021	Dnepr Mogilev	23	(0)
2022–2024	Lokomotiv Gomel	84	(15)
2025–	Bumprom Gomel	41	(9)
- * Club domestic league appearances and goals as of 6 July 2026

Ivan Zhostkin (Belarusian: Іван Жосткін; Russian: Иван Жёсткин; born 8 May 1991) is a Belarusian professional footballer who plays for Bumprom Gomel.
