= Kostyukov =

Kostyukov (Belarusian: Касцюкоў, Russian: Костюков, Ukrainian: Костюков) is an East Slavic language surname.

Notable people with the surname include:

- Igor Kostyukov (1961), Russian admiral
- Mikhail Kostyukov (1991), Russian football player
- Stepan Kostyukov (1999), Russian football player
- Vladimir Kostyukov (1954–2015), Belarusian professional football player and later coach
