= Valery Potorocha =

Belarusian footballer

Personal information
- Full name: Valery Valeryevich Potorocha
- Date of birth: 16 April 1996 (age 30)
- Place of birth: Rechitsa, Gomel Oblast, Belarus
- Height: 1.77 m (5 ft 10 in)
- Position: Midfielder

Team information
- Current team: Baranovichi
- Number: 96

Youth career
- 2011–2012: Vedrich-97 Rechitsa
- 2013–2015: Dinamo Minsk

Senior career*
Years	Team	Apps	(Gls)
2016	Khimik Svetlogorsk	15	(3)
2016–2017	Partizán Bardejov	26	(2)
2018	Smolevichi	4	(0)
2019–2020	Sputnik Rechitsa	53	(22)
2021	Dinamo Brest	8	(0)
2022–2023	Slavia Mozyr	31	(4)
2024	Belshina Bobruisk	32	(13)
2025	Amkar Perm	2	(0)
2025–2026	Bumprom Gomel	23	(12)
2026–	Baranovichi	6	(1)
- * Club domestic league appearances and goals as of 23 August 2026

Valery Potorocha (Belarusian: Валерый Патароча; Russian: Валерий Потороча; born 16 April 1996) is a Belarusian footballer who plays for Baranovichi.
