= Andrey Sakovich =

Belarusian footballer

Personal information
- Date of birth: 15 April 1992 (age 34)
- Place of birth: Gomel, Belarus
- Height: 1.87 m (6 ft 1 1/2 in)
- Position: Goalkeeper

Team information
- Current team: Bumprom Gomel

Youth career
- 2009–2012: Gomel

Senior career*
Years	Team	Apps	(Gls)
2010–2016	Gomel	19	(0)
2010	→ Gomel-2	29	(0)
2016	Lida	13	(0)
2017	Belshina Bobruisk	24	(0)
2018	UAS Zhitkovichi	28	(0)
2019	Naftan Novopolotsk	14	(0)
2020	Sputnik Rechitsa	0	(0)
2020	Gorodeya	3	(0)
2021–	Bumprom Gomel	58	(0)

International career
2012	Belarus U21	1	(0)
- * Club domestic league appearances and goals as of 31 December 2023

Andrey Sakovich (Belarusian: Андрэй Саковiч; Russian: Андрей Сакович; born 15 April 1992) is a Belarusian professional footballer who plays for Bumprom Gomel.
