= Vladislav Myzgin =

Russian football player

Personal information
- Full name: Vladislav Vladimirovich Myzgin
- Date of birth: 9 March 1996 (age 30)
- Place of birth: Tambov, Russia
- Height: 1.86 m (6 ft 1 in)
- Position: Forward

Youth career
- 2012–2014: Tambov Oblast Football Academy

Senior career*
Years	Team	Apps	(Gls)
2014–2017	Tambov	0	(0)
2017–2018	Metallurg Lipetsk	19	(1)
2018–2020	Zenit Penza		
2021	Lida	7	(2)
2021	Neman Grodno	8	(0)
2022	Naftan Novopolotsk	0	(0)
2022	Spartak Tambov	16	(0)
2023	Aluston-YUBK Alushta	6	(0)
2024	Baranovichi	5	(0)
2024	Volna Pinsk	15	(7)
2025	Lokomotiv Gomel	22	(7)
2026	Smorgon	4	(1)
- * Club domestic league appearances and goals as of 15 May 2026

Vladislav Vladimirovich Myzgin (Russian: Владислав Владимирович Мызгин; born 9 March 1996) is a Russian football player.

== Club career ==
He made his debut in the Russian Professional Football League for FC Metallurg Lipetsk on 27 August 2017 in a game against FC Energomash Belgorod.
