= Andrey Shamruk =

Belarusian footballer

Personal information
- Date of birth: 27 April 1994 (age 32)
- Place of birth: Brest, Belarus
- Height: 1.77 m (5 ft 9 1/2 in)
- Position: Midfielder

Team information
- Current team: Slavia Mozyr
- Number: 2

Youth career
- 2011–2012: Dinamo Brest

Senior career*
Years	Team	Apps	(Gls)
2012–2015	Dinamo Brest	46	(0)
2015	→ Baranovichi (loan)	13	(0)
2016–2017	Smolevichi-STI	44	(4)
2018–2020	Minsk	32	(0)
2021	Vitebsk	24	(0)
2022–2023	Dinamo Brest	38	(1)
2023–2024	Slavia Mozyr	35	(2)
2025	Gomel	25	(0)
2026	Dnepr Mogilev	11	(0)
2026–	Slavia Mozyr	5	(0)

International career^{‡}
2013–2014	Belarus U21	4	(0)
- * Club domestic league appearances and goals as of 4 September 2026 ‡ National team caps and goals as of 5 November 2014

Andrey Shamruk (Belarusian: Андрэй Шамрук; Russian: Андрей Шемрук; born 27 April 1994) is a Belarusian professional footballer who plays for Slavia Mozyr.
