= Makar Litskevich =

Belarusian footballer

Personal information
- Date of birth: 3 March 2002 (age 24)
- Place of birth: Baranovichi, Brest Oblast, Belarus
- Position: Midfielder

Team information
- Current team: Slutsk
- Number: 80

Youth career
- 2018–2020: Shakhtyor Soligorsk

Senior career*
Years	Team	Apps	(Gls)
2020–2024	Shakhtyor Soligorsk	2	(0)
2021	→ Sputnik Rechitsa (loan)	10	(0)
2022	→ Shakhtyor Petrikov (loan)	16	(0)
2025	Baranovichi	7	(0)
2026	Dnepr Mogilev	4	(0)
2026–	Slutsk	2	(0)

International career
2018–2019	Belarus U17	5	(0)
- * Club domestic league appearances and goals as of 31 July 2026

Makar Litskevich (Belarusian: Макар Ліцкевіч; Russian: Макар Лицкевич; born 3 March 2002) is a Belarusian professional footballer who plays for Slutsk.

== Honours ==
Shakhtyor Soligorsk

- Belarusian Premier League champion: 2020, 2021
