= Lukashov =

Lukashov is a Slavic male surname, its feminine counterpart is Lukashova. Notable people with the surname include:

- Denys Lukashov (born 1989), Ukrainian basketball player
- Yuriy Lukashov (born 1974), Belarusian football coach and former player

== See also ==
- Lukasheva
