= Yaroslav Makushinsky =

Belarusian footballer

Personal information
- Date of birth: 5 March 1998 (age 28)
- Place of birth: Kalinkavichy, Gomel Oblast, Belarus
- Height: 1.70 m (5 ft 7 in)
- Position: Defender

Team information
- Current team: Bumprom Gomel
- Number: 33

Youth career
- 2014–2017: Dinamo Minsk

Senior career*
Years	Team	Apps	(Gls)
2017	Slavia Mozyr	0	(0)
2018–2020	Lokomotiv Gomel	49	(1)
2020	Smolevichi	6	(0)
2021	Belshina Bobruisk	0	(0)
2021	→ Vertikal Kalinkovichi (loan)	7	(4)
2021–2023	Energetik-BGU Minsk	66	(0)
2024	Buxoro	11	(0)
2025	Vitebsk	15	(1)
2025	Slavia Mozyr	2	(0)
2025	→ Slavia Mozyr-2 (loan)	3	(0)
2026	Vitebsk	3	(0)
2026–	Bumprom Gomel	6	(0)

International career
2014–2015	Belarus U17	4	(0)
- * Club domestic league appearances and goals as of 29 August 2026

Yaroslav Makushinsky (Belarusian: Яраслаў Макушынскі; Russian: Ярослав Макушинский; born 5 March 1998) is a Belarusian professional footballer who plays for Bumprom Gomel.
