= Krivoshein =

Krivoshein, feminine: Krivosheina is a Russian patronymic surname derived from the nickname "krivosheya", "crooked-necked". Notable people with the surname include:

- Alexander Krivoshein
- Semyon Krivoshein

== See also ==
- Krivoshey
- Krivosheyev
