= Artem Miroyevskiy =

Belarusian footballer

Personal information
- Date of birth: 31 May 1999 (age 27)
- Place of birth: Zhlobin, Gomel Oblast, Belarus
- Height: 1.73 m (5 ft 8 in)
- Position: Forward

Team information
- Current team: Bumprom Gomel
- Number: 91

Youth career
- 2014–2018: Dinamo Minsk

Senior career*
Years	Team	Apps	(Gls)
2018	Dinamo Minsk	0	(0)
2018	→ Chist (loan)	13	(0)
2019–2020	Arsenal Dzerzhinsk	54	(22)
2021–2022	Rukh Brest	3	(0)
2022	→ Arsenal Dzerzhinsk (loan)	12	(0)
2023	Maxline Vitebsk	8	(0)
2023–2024	Bumprom Gomel	51	(8)
2025	Dnepr Mogilev	31	(6)
2026	Molodechno	10	(0)
2026–	Bumprom Gomel	7	(0)

International career
2015	Belarus U17	2	(0)
2017	Belarus U19	3	(0)
- * Club domestic league appearances and goals as of 29 August 2026

Artem Miroyevskiy (Belarusian: Арцём Міраеўскі; Russian: Артём Мироевский; born 31 May 1999) is a Belarusian professional footballer who plays for Belarusian First League club Bumprom Gomel.
