= Maksim Belov =

Belarusian professional footballer

Personal information
- Date of birth: 23 April 1999 (age 27)
- Place of birth: Lida, Grodno Oblast, Belarus
- Height: 1.98 m (6 ft 6 in)
- Position: Goalkeeper

Team information
- Current team: Dynamo Brest
- Number: 1

Youth career
- 2015–2016: Dnepr Mogilev

Senior career*
Years	Team	Apps	(Gls)
2016–2018	Dnepr Mogilev	4	(0)
2019	Dnyapro Mogilev	0	(0)
2020–2022	Shakhtyor Soligorsk	0	(0)
2023–2025	Neman Grodno	60	(0)
2026–	Dynamo Brest	2	(0)
- * Club domestic league appearances and goals as of 6 July 2026

Maksim Belov (Belarusian: Максім Бялоў; Russian: Максим Белов; born 23 April 1999) is a Belarusian professional footballer who plays for Belarusian Premier League club Dynamo Brest.
