= Semyon Lazarchik =

Belarusian footballer

Personal information
- Full name: Semyon Mikhaylovich Lazarchik
- Date of birth: 3 September 2000 (age 26)
- Place of birth: Minsk, Belarus
- Height: 1.99 m (6 ft 6 in)
- Position: Defender

Youth career
- 2016–2020: Isloch Minsk Raion

Senior career*
Years	Team	Apps	(Gls)
2020	Isloch Minsk Raion	2	(0)
2021	BATE Borisov	0	(0)
2021	Táborsko	2	(0)
2022–2023	Dubnica	10	(0)
2023	Slonim-2017	12	(0)
2024	Volna Pinsk	13	(0)
2025	Lokomotiv Gomel	11	(1)
- * Club domestic league appearances and goals as of 9 April 2026

Semyon Mikhaylovich Lazarchik (Belarusian: Сямён Міхайлавіч Лазарчык; Russian: Семён Михайлович Лазарчик; born 3 September 2000) is a Belarusian professional footballer.
