= Krivoshey =

Krivoshey or Krivoshei (Russian: Кривошей) is a Russian-language surname derived from the nickname that literally means "crooked-necked". Notable people with the surname include:

- David Krivoshei (born 1944), Israeli composer, conductor, and musical arranger
- Yelena Krivoshey (born 1977), Russian rhythmic gymnast

== See also ==
- Krivoshein
- Krivosheyev
