= Ryhor Reles =

Belarusian Jewish writer (1913–2004)

Ryhor Lvovich Reles (Belarusian: Рыгор Рэлес, Russian: Гирш Релес; April 23, 1913 – September 19, 2004), also known as Hirsh Reles, was a Belarusian-Jewish writer. He published a number of short stories about his travels to Belarusian shtetls. He was one of the last writers in Belarus who wrote in Yiddish.

== Early life ==
Reles was born in 1913 in Chashniki, Vitebsk Governorate, Russian Empire. His father Leib was a teacher at a cheder, while his mother was the daughter of a prosperous merchant family. World War I and the Russian Revolution disrupted the economic livelihood of his family and the larger Jewish community of Chashniki. However, the expulsion of Jews from within the war zone did not reach Chashniki. His mother died in 1919 and his father began leaving Chashniki regularly to seek work, as his position as a melamed brought him under increasing government scrutiny.

Reles stayed with his maternal grandfather, who cultivated an interest in Yiddish literature, including writers such as Sholem Aleichem. Reles spoke Belarusian and Russian as well as Yiddish, studying at a Soviet state-sponsored, Yiddish-language school, before moving to the local Belarusian-language school. He began to write poetry, initially in Belarusian, and then switched to Yiddish at the advice of his father. His first poem was published in a Soviet Jewish newspaper entitled Der Yunger Arbeiter in 1930. He wrote poems and prose in Yiddish and also several poems in Russian.

== Career ==
He joined his two sisters after graduating high school in 1931, and moved to Vitebsk, the nearest large city. He studied pedagogy at the Vitebsk Jewish Pedagogical Tekhnikum, an institution that trained instructors for the type of Soviet Yiddish-language schools that he had attended. After a year, he transferred to the Film Technical School, and enrolled in the Scenario Department. When he finished his studies in Vitebsk in September 1934, he was offered a job teaching in Yanavichy, but instead continued further pedagogical studies in Minsk.

He submitted a number of poems to the literary journal Shtern, the premiere Yiddish-language publication in Belarus. When he received no reply, he went to the paper's editorial offices in Minsk, where the assistant editor Zelik Axelrod met with him and read his poems aloud, which was overheard by chief editor Izi Kharik. Kharik accepted three out of four of Reles' works for publication, and went on to become a mentor to him. With Kharik's help, Reles was released from his teaching obligations in Yanavichy and was accepted into the Yiddish literature department of the Minsk Pedagogical Institute. On Axelrod and Kharik's recommendation, Reles was accepted to the Belarusian Writers' Union in 1936.

He left Minsk in late 1937 for a teaching position in a Yiddish school in Slutsk. He married his wife Yekha in early 1939, and the couple soon had a daughter, Raisel. He continued to be active in Yiddish culture in Soviet Belarus and published his first poetry collection, Onheyb, in 1939, with Axelrod serving as the book's editor. Eventually, he left Slutsk for another teaching position in Novogrudok and was joined by his wife and daughter; he also served as the content director for a local radio station. He returned to Minsk in early June 1941 to visit Axelrod, only to discover that his mentor had been arrested along with two other well-known Yiddish writers on 30 May 1941 and was being held in a Minsk prison. Kharik had already been imprisoned, tortured, and executed by this time.

== World War II ==
He joined the Red Army in the early part of 1941, fleeing the advancing German forces during the invasion of the Soviet Union in June 1941. On July 3, German troops entered Novogrudok where his wife and daughter were still living; they were caught by the Nazis and murdered in the Holocaust.

After surviving the war in the Ural Mountains, he was demobilized from the army in late 1941, and initially joined a road-cleaning crew, but then was recommended by his superiors as the editor of the district newspaper, Stroyitel' in Gremyachinsk. He struggled to find work with Yiddish publications. He began writing in Russian for a number of journals and newspapers. He also began using the formal name 'Grigorii' or the less formal 'Girsh and Grisha' for his professional work.

He left his position on the staff of the journal Vozhyk in 1948 after other editors informed him he was at the risk of investigation. Lacking other employment opportunities, he took a job teaching Russian literature and language at a night school. He began to publish in Yiddish again in 1961 in the Moscow-based journal Sovetish heymland, and went on to publish several collections of short stories and poetry in Yiddish, Belarusian, and Russian.

== Later years ==
Most of his works were translated and published in Belarusian. He was an active contributor to the Minsk Jewish Cultural Association in the 1990s and early 2000s. He published his memoirs in Russian, V krayu svetlykh berez (In the Land of Light Birch Trees) in 1997 as a cultural poirtrait of Yiddish life in Belarus from 1930s. At the time of his death at age 91, he had outlived the Soviet Union, and was considered the "patriarch of Jewish writers in Belarus".
