= Daniil Shapko =

Belarusian footballer

Personal information
- Date of birth: 29 April 2001 (age 25)
- Place of birth: Minsk, Belarus
- Height: 1.92 m (6 ft 4 in)
- Position: Goalkeeper

Team information
- Current team: Baranovichi
- Number: 12

Youth career
- 2013–2019: Dinamo Minsk

Senior career*
Years	Team	Apps	(Gls)
2020–2023	Dinamo Minsk	2	(0)
2021	→ Smorgon (loan)	5	(0)
2022–2023	→ Maxline Vitebsk (loan)	13	(0)
2023	→ Baranovichi (loan)	18	(0)
2024–2025	Dnepr Mogilev	11	(0)
2024	→ Dnepr-2 Mogilev	2	(0)
2024	→ Baranovichi (loan)	18	(0)
2026–	Baranovichi	11	(0)

International career
2019	Belarus U19		
- * Club domestic league appearances and goals as of 3 July 2026

Daniil Shapko (Belarusian: Данііл Шапко; Russian: Даниил Шапко; born 29 April 2001) is a Belarusian professional footballer who plays for Baranovichi.
