= Valery Streltsov =

Belarusian association football coach (born 1948)

Personal information
- Full name: Valery Ivanovich Streltsov
- Date of birth: 7 May 1948 (age 78)
- Place of birth: Bykhov, Belarusian SSR, Soviet Union
- Position: Striker

Senior career*
Years	Team	Apps	(Gls)
1967–1975	Dnepr Mogilev		

Managerial career
- 1976–1984: SDYuShOR-7 Mogilev
- 1984–1985: Dnepr Mogilev (director)
- 1990–2009: Dnepr Mogilev (director)
- 1986–1993: Dnepr Mogilev
- 1994–1995: Dnepr Mogilev
- 1995–2003: Dnepr Mogilev
- 2000–2003: Belarus (assistant)
- 2002: Belarus (caretaker)
- 2003–2005: Dnepr Mogilev
- 2007–2008: Dnepr Mogilev
- 2009–2012: Dinamo Minsk (director)
- * Club domestic league appearances and goals

Valery Streltsov is a Belarusian association football coach.

== Club career ==
Streltsov spent his entire playing career, from 1967 until 1975, in Spartak Mogilev (renamed to Dnepr Mogilev in 1973). After his early retirement (at the age of 27), he started working as coach in local Mogilev football academy. From 1984 till 1985, he worked as director for Dnepr Mogilev and, in 1986, he was appointed as team's coach, a position he held until 2008 with brief interruptions in 1993–1994, 1995, 2003 and 2005–2007. He stepped down for the last time in 2008 due to health problems. Since 1990, he was appointed as Dnepr's general director.

With Valery Streltsov as a coach, Dnepr Mogilev finished at the 2nd place in inaugural Belarusian championship in 1992 and won their only champions title in 1998.

In 2009, Streltsov partied ways with Dnepr and joined Dinamo Minsk as a general director.

== National team ==
From 2000 till 2003, Streltsov worked as assistant coach for Belarus national football team under head coach Eduard Malofeyev. In September 2002, in a Euro 2004 qualifying match against Netherlands, he acted as team's caretaker manager, replacing Malofeyev, who was unable to present at the game due to health condition. Belarus lost that game 0–3.
