= Vladislav Sychev =

Belarusian footballer

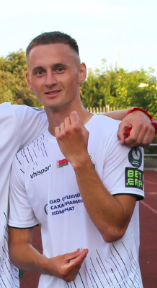

Personal information
- Date of birth: 26 January 2002 (age 24)
- Place of birth: Slutsk, Minsk Oblast, Belarus
- Height: 1.80 m (5 ft 11 in)
- Position: Midfielder

Team information
- Current team: Slutsk
- Number: 9

Youth career
- 2017–2019: RUOR Minsk
- 2019–2020: Slutsk

Senior career*
Years	Team	Apps	(Gls)
2020–	Slutsk	58	(8)
2021–2022	→ Lokomotiv Gomel (loan)	52	(7)
2025	→ Lokomotiv Gomel (loan)	26	(6)

International career
2018–2019	Belarus U17	5	(0)
- * Club domestic league appearances and goals as of 6 July 2026

Vladislav Sychev (Belarusian: Уладзіслаў Сычоў; Russian: Владислав Сычёв; born 26 January 2002) is a Belarusian professional footballer who plays for Slutsk.
