= Mikhail Kazimir =

Russian footballer

Personal information
- Full name: Mikhail Yuryevich Kazimir
- Date of birth: 7 June 2001 (age 25)
- Place of birth: Tolyatti, Russia
- Height: 1.77 m (5 ft 10 in)
- Position: Midfielder

Team information
- Current team: FC Bumprom Gomel
- Number: 20

Youth career
- –2018: Konoplyov football academy
- 2018–2019: FC Lokomotiv Moscow

Senior career*
Years	Team	Apps	(Gls)
2019–2020	FC Lada-Tolyatti	14	(0)
2020–2022	FC KAMAZ Naberezhnye Chelny	34	(0)
2022–2023	FC Dynamo Bryansk	29	(1)
2023–2024	FC KAMAZ Naberezhnye Chelny	0	(0)
2024	FC Znamya Truda Orekhovo-Zuyevo	13	(3)
2024–2025	FC Torpedo Miass	28	(2)
2025	FC Metallurg Lipetsk	14	(2)
2026	FC Volna Nizhny Novgorod Oblast	12	(0)
2026–	FC Bumprom Gomel	3	(0)
- * Club domestic league appearances and goals as of 22 August 2026

Mikhail Yuryevich Kazimir (Russian: Михаил Юрьевич Казимир; born 7 June 2001) is a Russian football player who plays for Belarusian First League club FC Bumprom Gomel.

== Club career ==
He made his debut in the Russian Football National League for FC KAMAZ Naberezhnye Chelny on 17 July 2021 in a game against FC Tekstilshchik Ivanovo.
