= Artsyom Pyatrenka =

Belarusian footballer

Personal information
- Date of birth: 1 March 2000 (age 26)
- Place of birth: Mozyr, Gomel Oblast, Belarus
- Height: 1.74 m (5 ft 8 1/2 in)
- Position: Forward

Team information
- Current team: Baranovichi
- Number: 34

Youth career
- 2014–2017: ABFF Academy

Senior career*
Years	Team	Apps	(Gls)
2017–2019	Slavia Mozyr	41	(11)
2020–2022	Rukh Brest	14	(2)
2021–2022	→ Slavia Mozyr (loan)	11	(0)
2022–2023	Slavia Mozyr	19	(1)
2024	Arsenal Dzerzhinsk	15	(1)
2025	Dnepr Mogilev	32	(11)
2026–	Baranovichi	11	(1)

International career
2016–2017	Belarus U17	5	(0)
2017–2018	Belarus U19	5	(0)
2019–2020	Belarus U21	6	(1)
- * Club domestic league appearances and goals as of 3 July 2026

Artsyom Pyatrenka (Belarusian: Арцём Пятрэнка; Russian: Артём Петренко; born 1 March 2000) is a Belarusian professional footballer who plays for Baranovichi.
