= Chashniki =

Chashniki Чашнікі (Belarusian) Чашники (Russian)
- Town
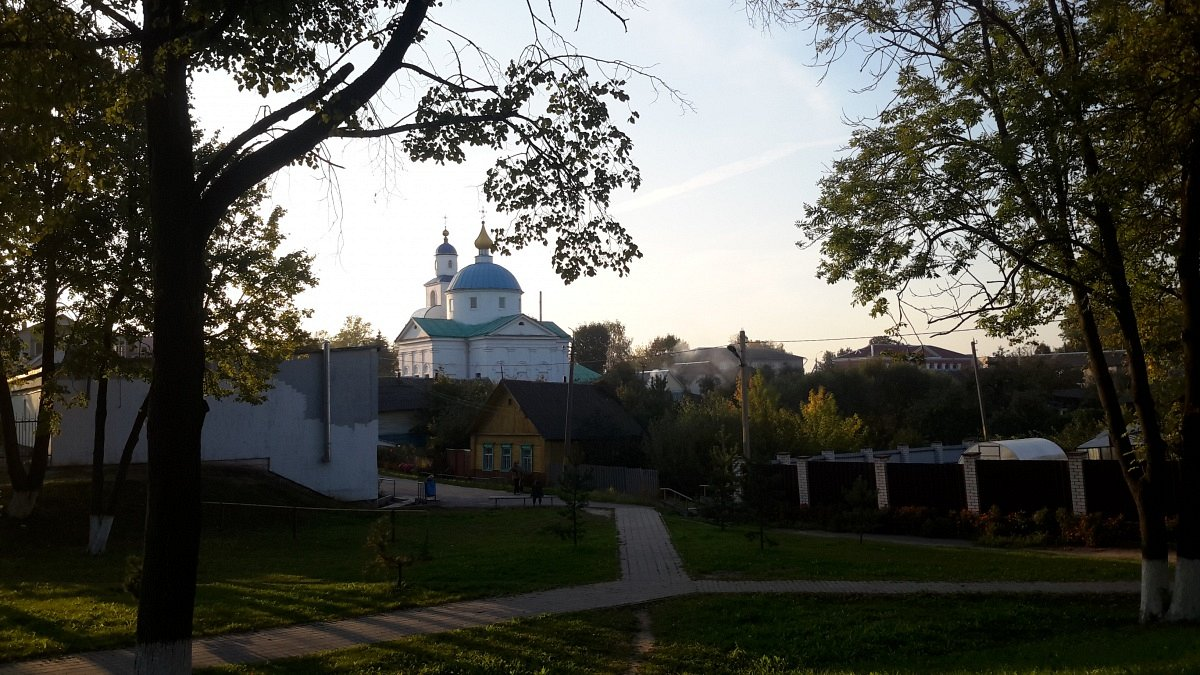
- The Church of the Holy Savior, 2015

- Flag Coat of arms

- Location within Belarus
- Coordinates: 54°51′12″N 29°09′53″E
- Country: Belarus
- Region: Vitebsk Region
- District: Chashniki District

Population (2025)
  - Total: 7,573
- Time zone: UTC+3 (MSK)
- Postal code: 211149
- Area code: +375 2133
- Vehicle registration: 2

Chashniki (Note: Belarusian: Чашнікі, romanized: Čašniki; Russian: Чашники; Polish: Czaśniki; Lithuanian: Čašnikai.) is a town in Vitebsk Region, Belarus. It serves as the administrative center of Chashniki District. It is famous for the Battle of Ula during the Livonian War and the Battle of Chashniki that took place during the French invasion of Russia in 1812. In 2021, its population was 8,092. As of 2025, it has a population of 7,573.

== Etymology ==
It is believed that the term Chashniki may come from the word chashnik, "cup maker".

== History ==
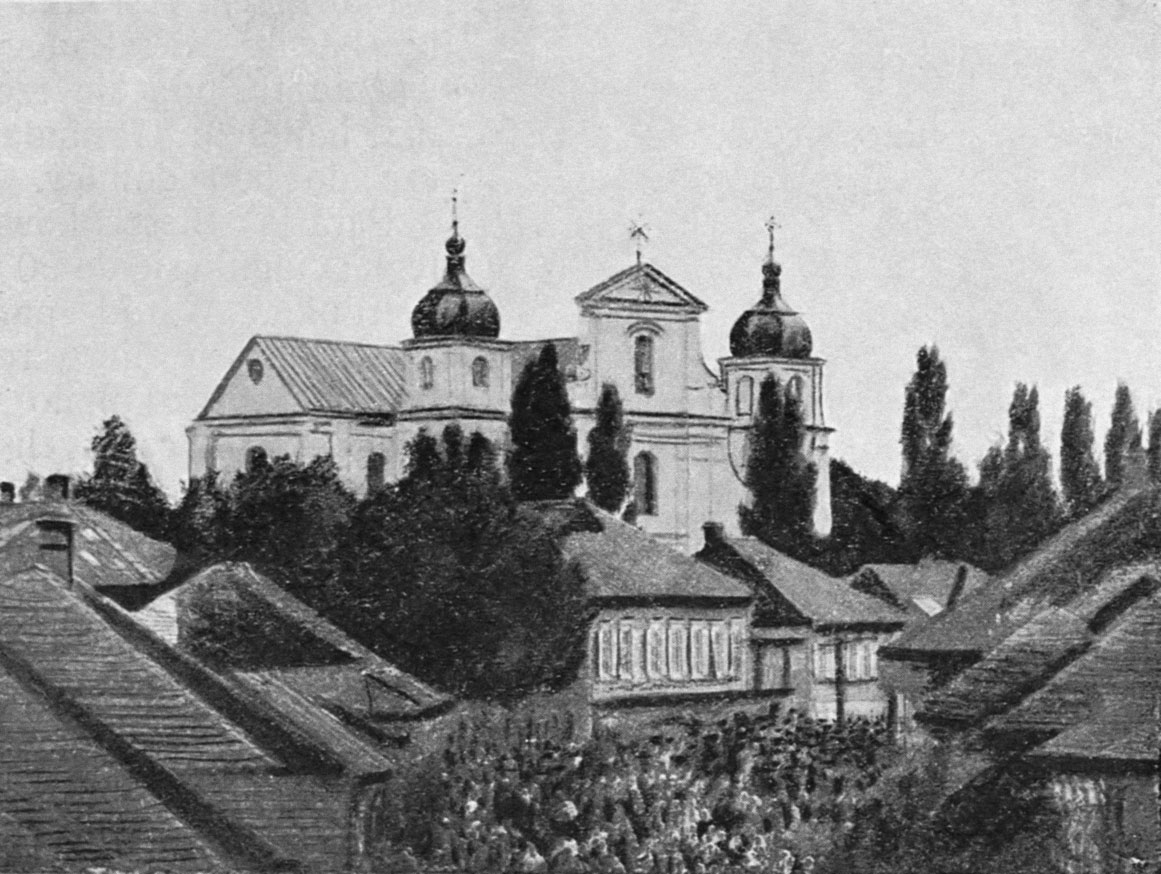
Church of St. Luke and Dominican Monastery, 1913

Chashniki was a private town of the Kiszka and Służka families, administratively located in the Polotsk Voivodeship of the Polish–Lithuanian Commonwealth. In 1564, Polish–Lithuanian forces defeated Russian invaders in the Battle of the Ula near the town.

The town was formerly home to the Chashniki castle, which was erected during the Livonian War under order of Ivan the Terrible. It burned down during the Great Northern War during the advancement of Peter the Great's troops through the area.

In the 19th century, the town conducted trade with the city of Riga, selling grain, flax, and timber.

Chashniki has historically had two churches. The first was the Church of St. Luke and Dominican Monastery, a baroque church erected in the 17th century, and monastery founded by Dominik Służka in 1674. In c. 1842, the Dominican monastery was closed and the church was converted into a regular Catholic parish church, and then in 1868 it was converted into an Orthodox church. It was demolished by Soviet authorities in 1964. The second was the Church of the Holy Savior (Chashniki), an example of classicism established in 1843. It was restored in 2000.

== Geography ==
Chashniki is located on the Vula River, a tributary of the Daugava.

== Jewish population ==
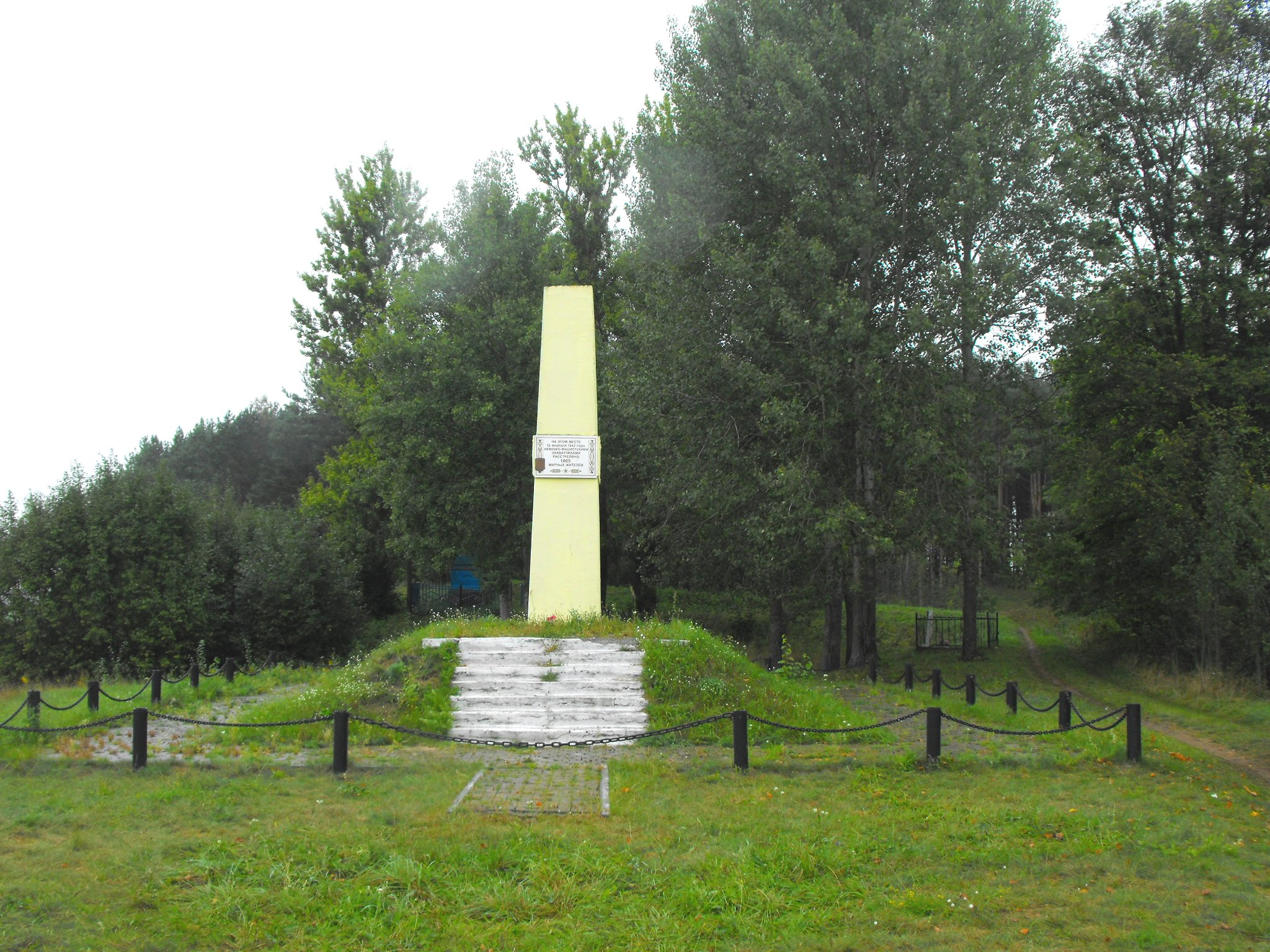
Holocaust memorial

In 1897, out of a total population of 4,590, about 4,000 (87%) were Jews. Besides those engaged in dairying, which was entirely in the hands of the Jewish population, there were 310 Jewish artisans and 99 Jewish journeymen.In 1906, according to the statistical data of the state archive of the Vitebsk province, the total number of residents of Chashniki was 5,530 people. Of these, 4,276 (77%) were Jews, 1,254 were Christians.

By 1939, Jews, numbering 1,109, were only 31.6% of the town's population. During Operation Barbarossa the Nazis entered the town on July 4, 1941, and did not create a ghetto due to the majority of Jews living in the town center. In mid-February 1942, the majority of the town's Jews were massacred.

== Notable residents ==
- S. Ansky (1863–1920), Jewish playwright
- Vladimir Denisov (born 1984), ice hockey player
- Ilya Dubinets (born 2004), footballer
- Dzmitry Girs (born 1997), footballer
- Vladimir Heifetz (1893–1970), Jewish composer
- Gennady Matsur (born 1960), calligrapher
- Ryhor Reles (1913–2004), Jewish writer
- Zinovy Rosenfeld (1904–1990), Jewish architect
- Saveliy Rubishov (1883–1957), Jewish surgeon and medical scientist
- Yan Skibsky (born 2002), footballer
- Boris Telpukhovsky (1903–?), military historian
- Alexander Tkachonak (born 1950), actor
- Zinovy Yuriev (1925–2020), Jewish science fiction writer
- Solomon Zeitlin (died 1976) Jewish-American historian
