= Dmitry Krivosheyev =

Belarusian footballer

Personal information
- Full name: Dmitry Sergeyevich Krivosheyev
- Date of birth: 19 September 1998 (age 28)
- Place of birth: Mozyr, Gomel Oblast, Belarus
- Height: 1.72 m (5 ft 8 in)
- Position: Midfielder

Youth career
- 2015–2018: Slavia Mozyr

Senior career*
Years	Team	Apps	(Gls)
2018–2023	Slavia Mozyr	26	(2)
2021	→ Lokomotiv Gomel (loan)	4	(0)
2023–2025	Lokomotiv Gomel	62	(9)
2026	Bumprom Gomel	6	(0)
- * Club domestic league appearances and goals as of 1 September 2026

Dmitry Sergeyevich Krivosheyev (Belarusian: Дзмітрый Сяргеевіч Крывашэеў; Russian: Дмитрий Сергеевич Кривошеев; born 19 September 1998) is a Belarusian professional footballer.
