= Artyom Karatay =

Belarusian footballer

Personal information
- Full name: Artyom Yuryevich Karatay
- Date of birth: 24 March 2004 (age 22)
- Place of birth: Lida, Grodno Oblast, Belarus
- Height: 1.91 m (6 ft 3 in)
- Position: Goalkeeper

Team information
- Current team: Gomel (on loan from Dinamo Minsk)
- Number: 49

Youth career
- DYuSSh Lida
- –2021: ABFF Academy
- 2021–2022: Dinamo Minsk

Senior career*
Years	Team	Apps	(Gls)
2022–	Dinamo Minsk	0	(0)
2022	→ Ostrovets (loan)	9	(0)
2023	→ Slavia Mozyr (loan)	25	(0)
2024–2025	→ Dinamo-2 Minsk	12	(0)
2025	→ Dynamo Brest (loan)	1	(0)
2026–	→ Gomel (loan)	3	(0)

International career^{‡}
2023–	Belarus U21	4	(0)
- * Club domestic league appearances and goals as of 6 July 2026 ‡ National team caps and goals as of 7 June 2025

Artyom Yuryevich Karatay (Belarusian: Арцём Юр'евіч Каратай; Russian: Артём Юрьевич Каратай; born 24 March 2004) is a Belarusian professional footballer, who plays for Gomel on loan from Dinamo Minsk.
