= Artem Bruy =

Belarusian footballer

Personal information
- Date of birth: 9 June 2003 (age 23)
- Place of birth: Dzyarzhynsk, Minsk Oblast, Belarus
- Height: 1.87 m (6 ft 2 in)
- Position: Defender

Team information
- Current team: Baranovichi
- Number: 19

Youth career
- 2018–2021: Minsk

Senior career*
Years	Team	Apps	(Gls)
2021–2022	Minsk	2	(0)
2022	→ Orsha (loan)	6	(0)
2022	Maxline Rogachev	14	(1)
2023	Naftan Novopolotsk	20	(0)
2024–2025	Maxline Vitebsk	32	(0)
2025	Osipovichi	7	(1)
2026–	Baranovichi	9	(1)

International career
2019	Belarus U17	3	(0)
- * Club domestic league appearances and goals as of 3 July 2026

Artem Bruy (Belarusian: Арцём Бруй; Russian: Артём Бруй; born 9 June 2003) is a Belarusian footballer who plays for Baranovichi.
