= Maksim Shishlov =

Belarusian footballer

Personal information
- Date of birth: 17 February 1996 (age 30)
- Place of birth: Mozyr, Gomel Oblast, Belarus
- Height: 1.94 m (6 ft 4 in)
- Position: Goalkeeper

Team information
- Current team: LKS Ślesin
- Number: 12

Youth career
- 2014–2017: Neman Grodno

Senior career*
| Years | Team | Apps | (Gls) |
| 2017–2020 | Neman Grodno | 3 | (0) |
| 2017 | → Granit Mikashevichi (loan) | 8 | (0) |
| 2018 | → Belshina Bobruisk (loan) | 14 | (0) |
| 2020 | → Slonim-2017 (loan) | 23 | (0) |
| 2021 | Slavia Mozyr | 5 | (0) |
| 2022 | Slonim-2017 | 7 | (0) |
| 2022–2023 | Cosmos Nowotaniec | 0 | (0) |
| 2022–2023 | → Izolator Boguchwała (loan) | 6 | (0) |
| 2023 | → Start Rymanów (loan) | 13 | (0) |
| 2023 | Start Rymanów | 9 | (0) |
| 2024 | Cosmos Nowotaniec | 10 | (0) |
| 2024– | LKS Ślesin | 34 | (0) |

International career
| 2017 | Belarus U21 | 1 | (0) |
- * Club domestic league appearances and goals as of 00:03, 27 June 2025 (UTC)

Maksim Shishlov (Belarusian: Максім Шышлоў; Russian: Максим Шишлов; born 17 February 1996) is a Belarusian professional footballer who plays as a goalkeeper for Polish V liga club LKS Ślesin.
