= Aleksey Butarevich =

Belarusian professional footballer

Personal information
- Date of birth: 12 January 1997 (age 29)
- Place of birth: Lida, Grodno Oblast, Belarus
- Height: 1.80 m (5 ft 11 in)
- Position: Midfielder

Team information
- Current team: Dynamo Brest
- Number: 44

Youth career
- 2013–2015: Neman Grodno

Senior career*
Years	Team	Apps	(Gls)
2016	Smolevichi-STI	4	(0)
2018–2019	Torpedo Minsk	28	(0)
2019–2020	Smolevichi	28	(2)
2020–2022	Dinamo Minsk	7	(0)
2021	→ Slutsk (loan)	25	(5)
2022–2023	Rotor Volgograd	28	(1)
2023	Zenit-2 Saint Petersburg	16	(0)
2024–2025	Torpedo-BelAZ Zhodino	53	(4)
2026	Maxline Vitebsk	14	(0)
2026–	Dynamo Brest	1	(0)

International career
2015	Belarus U19	3	(0)
2018	Belarus U21	2	(0)
- * Club domestic league appearances and goals as of 6 July 2026

Aleksey Butarevich (Belarusian: Аляксей Бутарэвіч; Russian: Алексей Бутаревич; born 12 January 1997) is a Belarusian professional footballer who plays for Belarusian Premier League club Dynamo Brest.
