= Viktar Sotnikaw =

Belarusian professional footballer

Personal information
- Date of birth: 27 July 2001 (age 25)
- Place of birth: Rubyel', Stolin District, Brest Oblast, Belarus
- Height: 1.87 m (6 ft 2 in)
- Position: Defender

Team information
- Current team: Gomel
- Number: 33

Youth career
- 2014–2019: Shakhtyor Soligorsk

Senior career*
Years	Team	Apps	(Gls)
2018–2022	Shakhtyor Soligorsk	22	(0)
2022–2025	BATE Borisov	60	(2)
2023	→ Bunyodkor (loan)	8	(0)
2026–	Gomel	14	(2)

International career^{‡}
2019	Belarus U19	2	(0)
2020–2022	Belarus U21	11	(0)
- * Club domestic league appearances and goals as of 6 July 2026 ‡ National team caps and goals as of 8 June 2022

Viktar Sotnikaw (Belarusian: Віктар Сотнікаў; Russian: Виктор Сотников; born 27 July 2001) is a Belarusian professional footballer who plays for Gomel.

== Honours ==
Shakhtyor Soligorsk

- Belarusian Premier League champion: 2020, 2021
- Belarusian Cup winner: 2018–19
