= Sergey Sazonchik =

Belarusian footballer

Personal information
- Date of birth: 20 October 2000 (age 26)
- Place of birth: Minsk, Belarus
- Height: 1.80 m (5 ft 11 in)
- Position: Midfielder

Team information
- Current team: Arsenal Dzerzhinsk
- Number: 10

Youth career
- 2008–2019: Minsk

Senior career*
Years	Team	Apps	(Gls)
2019–2021	Minsk	42	(0)
2022	BATE Borisov	14	(0)
2023–2025	Slavia Mozyr	55	(3)
2026–	Arsenal Dzerzhinsk	10	(0)

International career^{‡}
2021	Belarus U21	2	(0)
- * Club domestic league appearances and goals as of 3 July 2026 ‡ National team caps and goals as of 29 March 2021

Sergey Sazonchik (Belarusian: Сяргей Сазончык; Russian: Сергей Сазончик; born 20 October 2000) is a Belarusian footballer who plays for Arsenal Dzerzhinsk.

== Club career ==
=== Minsk ===
He is a graduate of the Minsk football club. He played for various youth teams of the club. Since 2017, he began playing for the reserve team in the reserve team championship. In the second half of 2018, he began to be involved in training with the foundation. At the same time, he took part in the UEFA Youth League. He made his debut in the tournament on 3 October in the first match of the first round of the National Champions' way against the Hungarian club Illes Academy.

Since 2019, he has been regularly included in the application of the main team for the matches of the Belarusian championship. On 21 July, he played his first match with Minsk in the Top League. In the away match against Vitebsk, Sazonchik appeared on the field in the starting line-up and was replaced in the 82nd minute by Leonid Kovel. Later he continued to play for the main team. In the 2021 season, he began to come on as a substitute more often.

=== BATE ===
In February 2022, following a meeting of the Committee on the Status and Transitions of Football Players, Sazonchik was recognized as a free agent and confirmed the loss of Minsk's rights to receive compensation for the training of a football player. On 23 February, Sergey became a player of Borisov BATE. He started the season with a victory in the Belarusian Super Cup on 5 March 2022, but the match itself sat on the bench. He made his debut for the club on 20 March 2022 in a match against Slavia Mozyr. Together with the Borisov club, he reached the final of the Belarusian Cup, where the Borisov club lost 1–2 to Gomel. He played his first full match on 29 June 2022 against Slutsk, scoring an assist. Together with the club, in July 2022, he went to the qualifying matches of the UEFA Conference League. He played his debut match in the European Cup tournament on 20 July 2022 against Turkish Konyaspor, coming on as a substitute in 61 minutes. He spent the season mainly as a substitute player, only once appearing on the field in the starting line-up, scoring an assist. In February 2023, he left the club, terminating the contract by agreement of the parties.

=== Slavia-Mozyr ===
In February 2023, the player moved to Slavia Mozyr. He made his debut for the club in the Belarusian Cup match on 5 March 2023 against Slutsk. As a result of the second cup match on 12 March 2023, he reached the semi-finals of the Belarusian Cup, defeating the Slutsk club in total matches. The first match in the championship was played on 17 March 2023 against Minsk. As a result of the semi-final matches of the Belarusian Cup, he lost to Torpedo-BelAZ Zhodinsky and was eliminated from the tournament draw. He scored his debut goal for the club on 13 August 2023 in a match against Dinamo Minsk. In November 2023, the player extended his contract with the Mozyr club. Throughout the season, the player was one of the main players of the club, scoring a goal and 3 assists in all competitions. At the end of the season, the player and the club finished the championship in the final seventh place.

== Honours ==
BATE Borisov

- Belarusian Super Cup winner: 2022
