= Denis Shpakovsky =

Belarusian footballer

Personal information
- Full name: Denis Vadimovich Shpakovsky
- Date of birth: 26 May 2001 (age 25)
- Place of birth: Minsk, Belarus
- Height: 1.85 m (6 ft 1 in)
- Position: Goalkeeper

Team information
- Current team: Baranovichi
- Number: 26

Youth career
- 2017–2019: Dinamo Minsk

Senior career*
Years	Team	Apps	(Gls)
2019–2025	Dinamo Minsk	15	(0)
2024	→ Minsk (loan)	5	(0)
2024	→ Slutsk (loan)	2	(0)
2026–	Baranovichi	2	(0)

International career
2019–2020	Belarus U19		
- * Club domestic league appearances and goals as of 3 July 2026

Denis Vadimovich Shpakovsky (Belarusian: Дзяніс Вадзімавіч Шпакоўскі; Russian: Денис Вадимович Шпаковский; born 26 May 2001) is a Belarusian professional footballer, who plays for Baranovichi, as a goalkeeper.
