= Yefimiya Krivosheyeva =

Russian storyteller

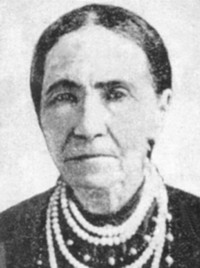

Yefimiya Petrovna Krivosheyeva (1 June 1867 – 24 June 1936) was an Erzya writer and folk storyteller.
