= Dzmitry Hushchanka =

Belarusian footballer

Dmitri Guschenko
Personal information
- Date of birth: 12 May 1988 (age 38)
- Place of birth: Vitebsk, Byelorussian SSR, Soviet Union
- Height: 1.83 m (6 ft 0 in)
- Position: Goalkeeper

Team information
- Current team: Dnepr Mogilev
- Number: 77

Youth career
- 2006–2008: Vitebsk

Senior career*
Years	Team	Apps	(Gls)
2008	Myasokombinat Vitebsk	15	(0)
2009	Slavia Mozyr	26	(0)
2010–2011	Vitebsk	44	(0)
2011–2014	Dinamo Minsk	15	(0)
2013	→ Belshina Bobruisk (loan)	28	(0)
2014	Belshina Bobruisk	13	(0)
2015–2025	Vitebsk	200	(0)
2026–	Dnepr Mogilev	5	(0)

International career
2010–2011	Belarus U21	2	(0)
- * Club domestic league appearances and goals as of 3 July 2026

Dzmitry Viktaravich Hushchanka (Belarusian: Дзмітрый Віктаравіч Гушчанка; Russian: Дмитрий Викторович Гущенко; born 12 May 1988) is a Belarusian professional football player currently playing for Dnepr Mogilev.
