= Natalia Krivoshein de Canese =

Czechoslovak-born Paraguayan linguist (1926–2019)

- Canese holding her Ñe'ẽryru
- Born: 7 May 1926; Prague, Czechoslovakia
- Died: 14 August 2019 (aged 93); Asunción, Paraguay

Natalia Krivoshein de Canese (7 May 1926 – 14 August 2019) was a Paraguayan philologist, an expert in the Guarani language.

== Biography ==
Natalia Krivoshein was born in Prague to a Russian family of Nicolás Krivoschein and Nina Lomshakova. She was brought to Argentina when she was three years old. Her father was an engineer. In 1930, by the invitation of Juan Belaieff he came to Paraguay and was among the founders of the Faculty of Engineering at the Universidad Nacional de Asunción. (At that time it was called Faculty of Physics and Mathematics).

At the age of 40 she graduated from the Guaraní Linguistics Institute (Instituto de Lingüística Guarani del Paraguay).

For several years she taught Guarani at the Higher Institute of Languages of the Universidad Nacional de Asunción. She was a founder of the magazine Revista Bilingüe de Cultura Ñemity.

She married Gino Canese (Arquímedes Canese), Paraguaian microbiologist. They had a daughter Marta Canese Krivoshein, (artist, born 1953), and sons: poet and author Jorge Canese, Ricardo Canese Krivoshein (Paraguayan politician, M.P.), Juan Carlos, Miguel Angel, and Andrés (Andrés Pedro Canese Krisvoshein, microbiologist).

== Books ==
- 1983: Gramática de la lengua guaraní
- 1987: El espanõl del Paraguay en contacto con el guaraní (with Graziella Corvalán)
- 2015: Guaraní para uso médico [Guarani Language for Use in Medicine] (with Gino Canese)

Together with Feliciano Acosta Alcatraz:

- 1990: Ñe'ẽryru. diccionario guaraní-español (Paraguayan Guaraní: Ñe'eryru: avañe'e-karaiñe'e, karaiñe'e-avañe'e)
- 1994: Ka’i rekovekue [Life of Ka'i] (collection of Paraguaian myths)
- 1994:Ka'i rembiasakue [Adventures of Ka'i] (collection of Paraguaian myths)
- 1996:Tetãgua remimombe'u (collection of Paraguaian myths)
- 1999:Mombe'ugua'u (collection of Paraguaian myths)
- 2005: (as editors) Ñe'ẽpoty aty, collection of Guarani poetry
