= Roman Piletsky =

Belarusian footballer

Personal information
- Full name: Roman Sergeyevich Piletsky
- Date of birth: 14 June 2003 (age 23)
- Place of birth: Minsk, Belarus
- Height: 1.69 m (5 ft 7 in)
- Position: Midfielder

Team information
- Current team: Dnepr Mogilev
- Number: 27

Youth career
- 2017–2021: BATE Borisov

Senior career*
Years	Team	Apps	(Gls)
2021–2025	BATE Borisov	36	(3)
2022	→ Slutsk (loan)	4	(0)
2023	→ Naftan Novopolotsk (loan)	28	(0)
2024	→ BATE-2 Borisov	10	(1)
2026–	Dnepr Mogilev	13	(1)
- * Club domestic league appearances and goals as of 3 July 2026

Roman Sergeyevich Piletsky (Belarusian: Раман Сяргеевіч Пілецкі; Russian: Роман Сергеевич Пилецкий; born 14 June 2003) is a Belarusian professional footballer who plays for Dnepr Mogilev.
