= Dzmitry Girs =

Belarusian footballer

Personal information
- Date of birth: 11 June 1997 (age 29)
- Place of birth: Chashniki, Vitebsk Oblast, Belarus
- Height: 1.80 m (5 ft 11 in)
- Position: Midfielder

Team information
- Current team: Neman Grodno
- Number: 55

Youth career
- 2013–2016: RCOP-BGU Minsk

Senior career*
Years	Team	Apps	(Gls)
2016–2021	Energetik-BGU Minsk	116	(7)
2018	→ Smolevichi (loan)	0	(0)
2019	→ Granit Mikashevichi (loan)	13	(2)
2022–2023	Slutsk	51	(5)
2024–2025	Vitebsk	58	(4)
2026–	Neman Grodno	8	(0)
- * Club domestic league appearances and goals as of 3 July 2026

Dzmitry Girs (Belarusian: Дзмітрый Гірс; Russian: Дмитрий Гирс; born 11 June 1997) is a Belarusian professional footballer who plays for Neman Grodno.
