= Semen Penchuk =

Belarusian footballer

Personal information
- Date of birth: 17 January 2001 (age 25)
- Place of birth: Minsk, Belarus
- Position: Midfielder

Team information
- Current team: Baranovichi
- Number: 29

Youth career
- 2006–2020: Minsk

Senior career*
Years	Team	Apps	(Gls)
2020–2025	Minsk	34	(4)
2025	→ Minsk-2	3	(1)
2025	→ Baranovichi (loan)	17	(6)
2026–	Baranovichi	10	(0)

International career
2019	Belarus U19	4	(0)
- * Club domestic league appearances and goals as of 3 July 2026

Semen Penchuk (Belarusian: Сямён Пяньчук; Russian: Семён Пеньчук; born 17 January 2001) is a Belarusian footballer who plays for Baranovichi.
