= Frol, Vologda Oblast =

Frol Фрол
- Village
- Location within Vologda Oblast Location within Russia
- Coordinates: 58°55′N 40°29′E
- Country: Russia
- Region: Vologda Oblast
- District: Gryazovetsky District
- Time zone: UTC+3:00

Frol (Russian: Фрол) is a rural locality (a village) in Pertsevskoye Rural Settlement, Gryazovetsky District, Vologda Oblast, Russia. The population was 374 in 2002.

== Geography ==
Frol is located 29 km (18 mi) northeast of Gryazovets (the district's administrative centre) by road. Yezhovo is the nearest rural locality.
