= Kiryl Radzivonaw =

Belarusian footballer

Personal information
- Date of birth: 9 May 2000 (age 26)
- Place of birth: Minsk, Belarus
- Height: 1.90 m (6 ft 3 in)
- Position: Defender

Team information
- Current team: Vitebsk
- Number: 6

Youth career
- 2017–2020: Dinamo Minsk

Senior career*
Years	Team	Apps	(Gls)
2020–2023	Dinamo Minsk	0	(0)
2020	→ Smolevichi (loan)	7	(0)
2021–2022	→ Belshina Bobruisk (loan)	54	(1)
2023	→ Isloch Minsk Raion (loan)	20	(0)
2024–2025	Isloch Minsk Raion	13	(0)
2026–	Vitebsk	13	(1)
- * Club domestic league appearances and goals as of 3 July 2026

Kiryl Radzivonaw (Belarusian: Кірыл Радзівонаў; Russian: Кирилл Родионов; born 9 May 2000) is a Belarusian professional footballer who plays for Vitebsk.
