= Yan Skibsky =

Belarusian footballer

Personal information
- Full name: Yan Vitalyevich Skibsky
- Date of birth: 25 December 2002 (age 23)
- Place of birth: Chashniki, Vitebsk Oblast, Belarus
- Position: Defender

Team information
- Current team: Maxline Vitebsk
- Number: 22

Youth career
- 2016–2020: Vitebsk

Senior career*
Years	Team	Apps	(Gls)
2020–2025	Vitebsk	111	(5)
2026–	Maxline Vitebsk	14	(0)

International career^{‡}
2021–2023	Belarus U21	13	(0)
- * Club domestic league appearances and goals as of 4 July 2026 ‡ National team caps and goals as of 20 November 2023

Yan Vitalyevich Skibsky (Belarusian: Ян Вітальевіч Скібскі; Russian: Ян Витальевич Скибский; born 25 December 2002) is a Belarusian footballer who plays for Maxline Vitebsk.
