= Adama Barro =

Burkinabé international footballer

Personal information
- Date of birth: 3 September 1996 (age 30)
- Position: Midfielder

Team information
- Current team: Rahimo FC

Senior career*
Years	Team	Apps	(Gls)
2014–2016	RC Bobo Dioulasso		
2016–	Rahimo FC		

International career^{‡}
2015–	Burkina Faso	4	(0)
- * Club domestic league appearances and goals as of 11:54, 27 September 2018 (UTC) ‡ National team caps and goals as of 11:54, 27 September 2018 (UTC)

Adama Barro (born 3 September 1996) is a Burkinabé international footballer who plays for Rahimo FC, as a midfielder.

== Career ==
He has played club football for RC Bobo Dioulasso and Rahimo FC.

He made his international debut for Burkina Faso in 2015.
