= Pavel Prishivalko =

Belarusian professional footballer

Personal information
- Date of birth: 25 July 1999 (age 27)
- Place of birth: Minsk, Belarus
- Height: 1.83 m (6 ft 0 in)
- Position: Goalkeeper

Team information
- Current team: Belshina Bobruisk
- Number: 31

Youth career
- 2008–2018: Minsk

Senior career*
Years	Team	Apps	(Gls)
2019–2022	Minsk	39	(0)
2023	Football Center Brest	18	(0)
2024	Torpedo-BelAZ Zhodino	0	(0)
2024	→ Torpedo-BelAZ-2 Zhodino	12	(0)
2025	Lokomotiv Gomel	31	(0)
2026–	Belshina Bobruisk	2	(0)
- * Club domestic league appearances and goals as of 3 July 2026

Pavel Prishivalko (Belarusian: Павел Прышывалка; Russian: Павел Пришивалко; born 25 July 1999) is a Belarusian professional footballer who plays for Belshina Bobruisk.
