= Yury Lukashov =

Belarusian footballer and coach

Personal information
- Full name: Yury Nikolayevich Lukashov
- Date of birth: 29 December 1974 (age 51)
- Place of birth: Mozyr, Belarusian SSR
- Position: Midfielder

Team information
- Current team: Gomel (assistant coach)

Senior career*
| Years | Team | Apps | (Gls) |
| 1993 | Polesye Mozyr | 17 | (2) |
| 1994 | Fandok Bobruisk | 5 | (0) |
| 1995–1996 | MPKC Mozyr | 28 | (3) |
| 1996 | Shakhtyor Soligorsk | 12 | (0) |
| 1997–2002 | Dnepr-Transmash Mogilev | 157 | (10) |
| 2003–2005 | Neman Grodno | 79 | (4) |
| 2006–2008 | Dnepr Mogilev | 27 | (0) |

Managerial career
- 2008–2013: Dnepr Mogilev (assistant)
- 2014: Dnepr Mogilev
- 2015–2019: Dnepr Mogilev (assistant)
- 2019–2021: Sputnik Rechitsa (assistant)
- 2022: Dnepr Mogilev
- 2022: Slavia Mozyr (assistant)
- 2023–2024: Vitebsk (assistant)
- 2025–: Gomel (assistant)
- * Club domestic league appearances and goals

Yury Nikolayevich Lukashov (Belarusian: Юрый Мікалаевіч Лукашоў; Russian: Юрий Николаевич Лукашов; born 29 December 1974 in Mozyr) is a Belarusian professional football coach and a former player. In 2014, he became a Dnepr Mogilev head coach, after working in the club as assistant and reserves coach for several years.

== Honours ==
MPKC Mozyr

- Belarusian Premier League champion: 1996

Dnepr-Transmash Mogilev

- Belarusian Premier League champion: 1998
