= Vladimir Kostyukov =

Belarusian footballer and coach

Personal information
- Date of birth: 14 October 1954
- Place of birth: Sudak, Ukrainian SSR
- Date of death: 17 December 2015 (aged 61)
- Position: Midfielder

Senior career*
Years	Team	Apps	(Gls)
1972–1974	Dnepr Mogilev		
1974	SKA Minsk		
1975	Dnepr Mogilev		
1976	Burevestnik Minsk		
1977–1981	Dnepr Mogilev		
1982	Torpedo Mogilev		
1983–1986	Dnepr Mogilev	121	(6)

Managerial career
- 1986–1995: Dnepr Mogilev (assistant)
- 1995: Dnepr Mogilev
- 1996–2003: Dnepr-Transmash Mogilev (assistant)
- 2003: Dnepr-Transmash Mogilev (caretaker)
- 2003–2005: Dnepr Mogilev (assistant)
- 2006–2007: Dnepr Mogilev
- 2007–2013: Dnepr Mogilev (assistant)
- 2013: Dnepr Mogilev
- 2014–2015: Dnepr Mogilev (assistant)
- * Club domestic league appearances and goals

Vladimir Kostyukov (Belarusian: Уладзiмiр Касцюкоў; Russian: Владимир Костюков; 14 October 1954 – 17 December 2015) was a Belarusian professional football player and later coach. He spent the majority of his playing and entire coaching career in Dnepr Mogilev. Over the years he has been appointed as a caretaker or permanent head coach several times, with the latest head coach spell starting in October 2013. Kostyukov died on 17 December 2015.
