= Alyaksey Ivanow =

Belarusian footballer

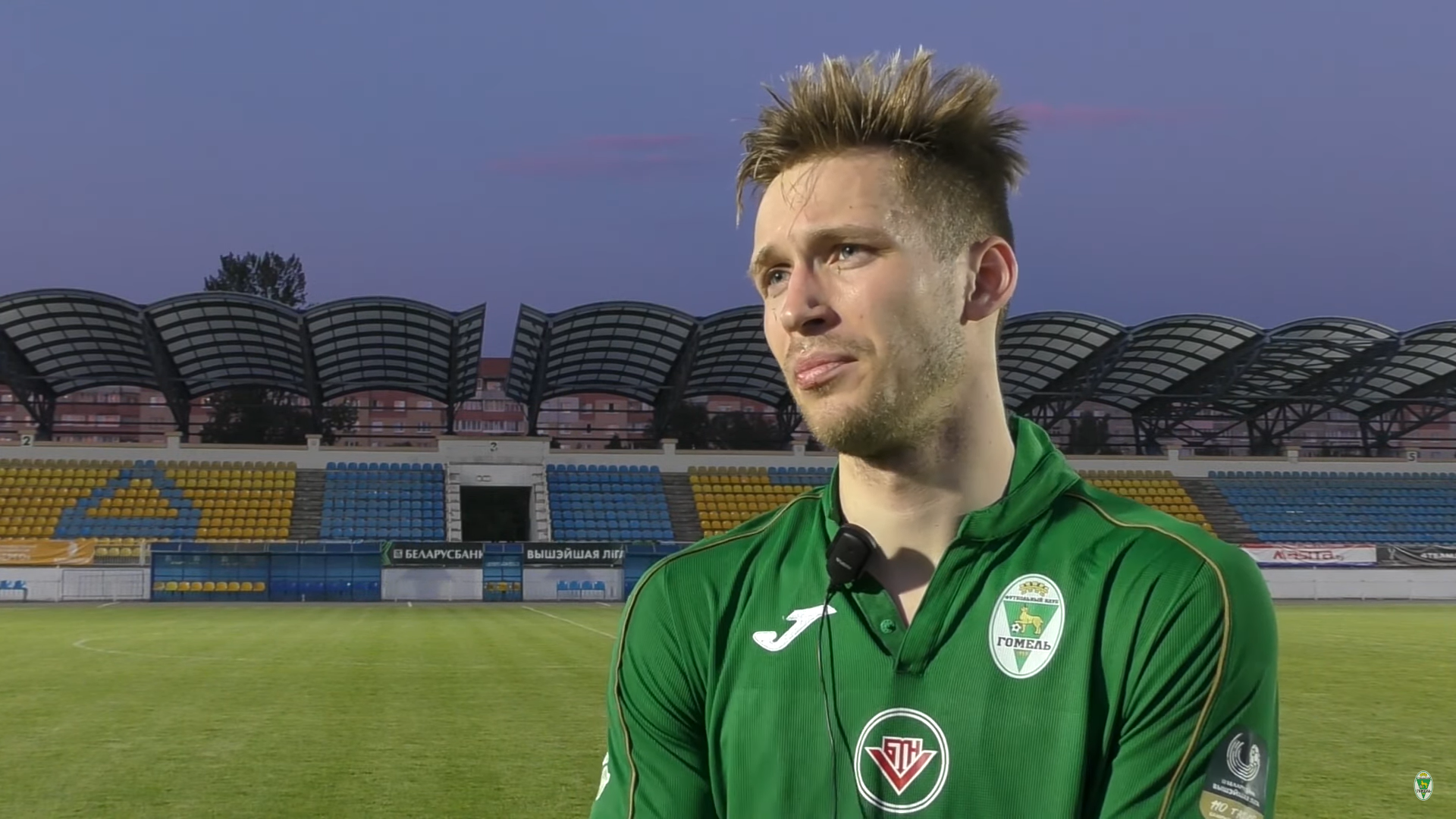

Personal information
- Date of birth: 19 February 1997 (age 29)
- Place of birth: Minsk, Belarus
- Height: 1.82 m (6 ft 0 in)
- Position: Defender

Team information
- Current team: Dinamo Minsk
- Number: 12

Youth career
- 2013–2014: Minsk

Senior career*
| Years | Team | Apps | (Gls) |
| 2014–2016 | Minsk | 2 | (0) |
| 2016 | → Dinamo Brest (loan) | 15 | (0) |
| 2017–2019 | Dinamo Brest | 10 | (1) |
| 2018 | → Luch Minsk (loan) | 26 | (1) |
| 2019–2020 | Minsk | 16 | (0) |
| 2021 | Gomel | 23 | (2) |
| 2022 | Torpedo-BelAZ Zhodino | 13 | (0) |
| 2023–2025 | Slavia Mozyr | 84 | (11) |
| 2026– | Dinamo Minsk | 5 | (1) |

International career^{‡}
| 2016–2018 | Belarus U21 | 14 | (0) |
- * Club domestic league appearances and goals as of 4 July 2026 ‡ National team caps and goals as of 15 October 2018

Alyaksey Ivanow (Belarusian: Аляксей Іваноў; Russian: Алексей Иванов; born 19 February 1997) is a Belarusian footballer who plays for Dinamo Minsk.

== Honours ==
Dinamo Brest

- Belarusian Cup winner: 2016–17, 2017–18

Gomel

- Belarusian Cup winner: 2021–22
