= Dmitry Dudar =

Belarusian professional footballer

Dzmitry Dudar
Personal information
- Date of birth: 8 November 1991 (age 35)
- Place of birth: Grodno, Byelorussian SSR, Soviet Union
- Height: 1.97 m (6 ft 5 1/2 in)
- Position: Goalkeeper

Youth career
- 2008–2010: Dinamo Minsk

Senior career*
Years	Team	Apps	(Gls)
2011–2012	Belcard Grodno	45	(0)
2013	Khimik Svetlogorsk	21	(0)
2014–2015	Dinamo Brest	22	(0)
2016	Granit Mikashevichi	14	(0)
2016–2017	Slutsk	29	(0)
2018–2019	Gomel	23	(0)
2019–2021	Neman Grodno	42	(0)
2022–2023	Torpedo-BelAZ Zhodino	26	(0)
2024–2025	Dinamo Brest	4	(0)

International career^{‡}
2010	Belarus U21	2	(0)
2017	Belarus B	1	(0)
- * Club domestic league appearances and goals as of 3 April 2026 ‡ National team caps and goals as of 16 July 2017

Dzmitry Dudar (Belarusian: Дзмітрый Дудар; Russian: Дмитрий Дударь; born 8 November 1991) is a Belarusian former professional footballer.
