= Dmitry Antilevsky =

Belarusian professional footballer

Dmitry Antilevsky Дзмітрый Анцілеўскі
Personal information
- Date of birth: 12 June 1997 (age 29)
- Place of birth: Minsk, Belarus
- Height: 1.74 m (5 ft 8 1/2 in)
- Position: Forward

Team information
- Current team: Arsenal Dzerzhinsk
- Number: 90

Youth career
- 2013–2016: BATE Borisov

Senior career*
Years	Team	Apps	(Gls)
2015–2017	BATE Borisov	4	(0)
2017	→ Dnepr Mogilev (loan)	19	(0)
2018	Minsk	16	(4)
2018–2019	Dinamo Minsk	7	(0)
2020–2021	Torpedo-BelAZ Zhodino	49	(13)
2022	Dinamo Tbilisi	24	(3)
2023	BATE Borisov	26	(8)
2024–2025	Hapoel Haifa	26	(2)
2025	ML Vitebsk	9	(0)
2026–	Arsenal Dzerzhinsk	11	(2)

International career^{‡}
2013	Belarus U17	3	(0)
2015	Belarus U19	3	(2)
2017–2018	Belarus U21	12	(6)
2017	Belarus B	1	(0)
2020–	Belarus	19	(2)
- * Club domestic league appearances and goals as of 3 July 2026 ‡ National team caps and goals as of 18 November 2024

Dmitry Antilevsky (Belarusian: Дзмітрый Сяргеевіч Анцілеўскі; Russian: Дмитрий Антилевский; born 12 June 1997) is a Belarusian professional footballer who plays for Arsenal Dzerzhinsk and the Belarus national team.

== Club career ==
On 22 December 2021, Dinamo Tbilisi announced the signing of Antilevsky.

== International goal ==
Scores and results list Belarus' goal tally first.

No	Date	Venue	Opponent	Score	Result	Competition
1.	15 October 2023	Kybunpark, St.Gallen, Switzerland	Switzerland	3–1	3–3	UEFA Euro 2024 qualifying
2.	21 November 2023	Fadil Vokrri Stadium, Pristina, Kosovo	Kosovo	1–0	1–0	UEFA Euro 2024 qualifying

== Personal life ==
His brother Aleksey Antilevskiy is also a professional footballer.

== Honours ==
BATE Borisov

- Belarusian Premier League: 2016
- Belarusian Super Cup: 2017

Dinamo Tbilisi

- Erovnuli Liga: 2022
