= Frol Panarin =

Belarusian footballer

Personal information
- Date of birth: 10 September 2002 (age 24)
- Place of birth: Belarus
- Position: Midfielder

Team information
- Current team: Maxline Vitebsk

Youth career
- 2016–2021: Vitebsk

Senior career*
Years	Team	Apps	(Gls)
2021–2025	Vitebsk	13	(1)
2026–	Maxline Vitebsk	0	(0)
- * Club domestic league appearances and goals as of 25 August 2026

Frol Panarin (Belarusian: Фрол Панарын; Russian: Фрол Панарин; born 10 September 2002) is a Belarusian footballer who plays for Maxline Vitebsk.
