= Aleksey Antilevsky =

Belarusian footballer

Personal information
- Full name: Aleksey Sergeyevich Antilevsky
- Date of birth: 2 February 2002 (age 24)
- Place of birth: Minsk, Belarus
- Height: 1.81 m (5 ft 11 in)
- Position: Midfielder

Team information
- Current team: Slavia Mozyr
- Number: 11

Youth career
- 2008–2011: Dinamo Minsk
- 2011–2014: Minsk
- 2014–2017: BATE Borisov
- 2018–2019: Dinamo Brest

Senior career*
Years	Team	Apps	(Gls)
2020	Dinamo Brest	0	(0)
2020	→ Rukh Brest (loan)	4	(2)
2021–2023	Torpedo-BelAZ Zhodino	44	(3)
2023	→ Slavia Mozyr (loan)	25	(3)
2024–2025	Gomel	41	(6)
2026–	Slavia Mozyr	14	(0)

International career^{‡}
2021–2023	Belarus U21	9	(1)
- * Club domestic league appearances and goals as of 6 July 2026 ‡ National team caps and goals as of 17 October 2023

Aleksey Sergeyevich Antilevsky (Belarusian: Аляксей Сяргеевіч Анцілеўскі; Russian: Алексей Сергеевич Антилевский; born 2 February 2002) is a Belarusian professional footballer who plays for Slavia Mozyr.

His brother Dmitry Antilevsky is also a professional footballer.
