= FC Lokomotiv Gomel =

Lokomotiv Gomel
- Full name: FC Lokomotiv Gomel
- Founded: 2008
- Ground: Lokomotiv Stadium, Gomel
- Capacity: 8,000
- Head coach: Andrey Marozaw
- League: ?
- 2025: Belarusian First League, 3nd of 18
Home colours	Away colours	Third colours

FC Lokomotiv Gomel is a Belarusian professional football club based in Gomel.

== History ==
The team was founded in 2008 as Gomelzheldortrans, and later that same year, they won the Gomel Oblast championship. Following a successful performance in the final tournament among the winners of regional leagues, at the end of the year, the Gomelzheldortrans were promoted to the Belarusian Second League. In 2014, Gomelzheldortrans made their debut in the First League.

In December 2016, the club changed its name to Lokomotiv Gomel.

== Current squad ==
As of 25 August 2025 Note: Flags indicate national team as defined under FIFA eligibility rules; some limited exceptions apply. Players may hold more than one non-FIFA nationality.

No.	Pos.	Nation	Player
2	MF	BLR	Dmitriy Nizhnik
5	DF	BLR	Kirill Kovsh
7	MF	BLR	Artem Smaltser
8	MF	RUS	Aleksandr Puzach
9	MF	BLR	Vladislav Sychev
10	MF	BLR	Dmitry Krivosheyev
11	MF	BLR	Stanislav Krivorot
14	MF	BLR	Aleksey Stroychuk
15	DF	BLR	Aleksey Petrusevich
17	FW	RUS	Vladislav Myzgin
21	MF	BLR	Yevgeny Milevsky
22	MF	BLR	Pavel Shawchenka

No.	Pos.	Nation	Player
24	DF	BLR	Maksim Katsynel
25	FW	BLR	Dmitriy Tikhomirov
30	FW	BLR	Artem Davidovich
31	GK	BLR	Pavel Prishivalko
55	DF	BLR	Semyon Lazarchik
77	MF	BLR	Artem Drozdovich
88	FW	BLR	Mikita Nyakrasaw
93	GK	BLR	Yevgeniy Isachenko
97	FW	BLR	Yury Muzychenka
99	FW	RUS	Igor Kozlov
