= FC Baranovichi =

Baranovichi Baranavichy
- Full name: Football Club Baranavichy/Baranovichi
- Founded: 1945; 81 years ago
- Ground: Locomotive Stadium (Lakamatyw/Lokomotiv Stadium)
- Capacity: 3,749
- Director: Mikhail Sholokhov (Mikhail Sholakhaw)
- Head Coach: Raman Kirenkin
- League: Belarusian Premier League
- 2025: Belarusian First League, 1st of 18 (Promoted)
Home colours	Away colours

FC Baranovichi or FC Baranavichy (Belarusian: ФК Баранавічы, romanized: FK Baranavičy, Russian: ФК Барановичи, romanized: FK Baranovichi) is a Belarusian professional football club based in Baranovichi (Baranavichy), Brest Oblast. Their home stadium is Lokomotiv (Lakamatyw) Stadium, Baranavichy. The club was founded in 1945 and had changed its name several times during its history. Team colors are red and blue.

== History ==
The club was established in 1945 as Locomotive (Lokomotiv Baranovichi, Lakamatyw Baranavichy). Throughout the history the club was reattached to various local organizations and industries and its name was changed accordingly. The club participated in the Belarusian SSR League and later in lower tiers of Belarusian championship as Lokomotiv/Lakamatyw (1945, 1950–1952, 1961, 1963–1964, 1968–1984), Baranavichy military unit (1946), Dinamo/Dynama (1947–1949), Pischevik/Kharchavik (1953–1956), Baranavichy city team (1957–1959), Promkombinat/Pramkambinat (1960), Salyut (1962), Tekstilschik/Tekstylshchyk (1965–1967, 1985–1989, 1993), Baranovichi/Baranavichy (1990), Khimik (1991–1992), Metapol (1993–1995).

Since 1995 the club is permanently known as FC Baranavichy (FC Baranovichi) .

== Current squad ==
As of 25 August, 2026

Note: Flags indicate national team as defined under FIFA eligibility rules; some limited exceptions apply. Players may hold more than one non-FIFA nationality.

No.	Pos.	Nation	Player
2	DF	BLR	Stanislav Kendysh
4	DF	BLR	Vladislav Karpenya
5	DF	RUS	Vladimir Fedotov
6	MF	KAZ	Alibi Tuzakbaev
7	MF	RUS	Timur Pukhov
8	MF	BLR	Vadim Balbukh
9	MF	BLR	Yegor Lapun
10	MF	BLR	Fedor Lebedev
11	MF	BLR	Nikolay Ryabykh (on loan from Slavia Mozyr)
12	GK	BLR	Daniil Shapko
17	FW	UKR	Maksym Shevchenko
19	DF	BLR	Artem Bruy
22	MF	BLR	Mikhail Bondarenko (on loan from Dynamo Brest)
23	MF	BLR	Vasily Vasilenko

No.	Pos.	Nation	Player
26	GK	BLR	Denis Shpakovsky
29	FW	BLR	Semen Penchuk
33	DF	BLR	Kirill Muzychenko (on loan from Maxline Vitebsk)
34	FW	BLR	Artsyom Pyatrenka
45	FW	KAZ	Ersultan Torekul
77	FW	BLR	Martin Artyukh
88	MF	BLR	Zakhar Gitselev
93	GK	BLR	Artur Dresmanis
96	MF	BLR	Valery Potorocha
97	DF	BLR	Timofey Tkachyov
-	MF	BLR	Vladislav Chernyak
-	MF	BLR	Dmitry Nakonechny
-	MF	BLR	Stanislav Stefanovich (on loan from Fortuna Minsk)
