= FC Bumprom Gomel =

Belarusian football club

Bumprom Gomel
- Full name: Football Club Bumprom Gomel
- Founded: 2016; 10 years ago
- Ground: SDYuShOR-6 Stadium, Gomel
- Chairman: Kirill Yashchenko
- Head Coach: Denis Drigalev (caretaker)
- League: Belarusian First League
- 2025: Belarusian First League, 6th

FC Bumprom Gomel is a Belarusian football club based in Gomel.

== History ==
Bumprom Gomel was founded in 2016 as an amateur-level futsal team. Since 2017 Bumprom switched to football and joinel Gomel Oblast league. In 2018 Bumprom made Belarusian Second League debut. After spending one more season in the Gomel Oblast championship, they returned to the Second League in 2020. In 2022 Bumprom reached the knockout phase of the league, but was eliminated in the Round of 16. Despite this, the club was chosen by ABFF as additional candidate for promotion. In 2023 Bumprom made Belarusian First League debut.

== Current squad ==
As of 19 October 2026

Note: Flags indicate national team as defined under FIFA eligibility rules; some limited exceptions apply. Players may hold more than one non-FIFA nationality.

No.	Pos.	Nation	Player
2	DF	BLR	German Kutkovich
4	MF	BLR	Sergey Kruzhilin
5	DF	BLR	Dmitry Kaplunov
8	MF	BLR	Ivan Zhostkin
9	FW	BLR	Kiryl Sidarenka
10	MF	BLR	Vladislav Drapeza
11	MF	BLR	Vladimir Dubrovsky
20	MF	RUS	Mikhail Kazimir
21	MF	BLR	Nikita Ovsyanik
22	DF	RUS	Igor Yegorov
23	GK	RUS	Vladislav Yarukov

No.	Pos.	Nation	Player
29	MF	BLR	Maksim Samotoy
33	DF	BLR	Yaroslav Makushinsky
47	MF	BLR	Andrey Kabyshev
59	FW	BLR	Artem Zhevnerenko
66	DF	TJK	Sino Absamadov
72	MF	BLR	Alikhan Fazylov
77	FW	BLR	Dmitry Latykhov
79	MF	BLR	Vladislav Kabyshev
91	FW	BLR	Artem Miroyevskiy
93	GK	BLR	Yevgeny Isachenko
95	MF	BLR	Mark Tychko
