= FC Dnepr Mogilev =

Dnepr Mogilev
- Full name: Football Club Dnepr-Mogilev
- Founded: 4 January 1960; 66 years ago
- Ground: Spartak Stadium, Mogilev
- Capacity: 7,350
- Chairman: Aleksandr Moroz
- Manager: Igor Kriushenko
- League: Belarusian Premier League
- 2025: Belarusian First League, 2nd of 18 (Promoted)
- Website: fc-dnepr.by
Home colours	Away colours	Third colours

FC Dnepr Mogilev (Belarusian: ФК Дняпро Магілёў, romanized: FK Dnyapro Mahilyow; Russian: ФК Днепр Могилёв) is a Belarusian professional football club, playing in the city of Mogilev. Their home stadium is Spartak Stadium.

== History ==
Dnepr Mogilev was founded in 1960 under the name Khimik Mogilev and began playing in the Class B (second-tier league) of the Soviet championship, which consisted of over 140 teams split into several regional zones. In 1963, the team was relegated to the third tier due to league structure reorganization, and their name was changed to Spartak Mogilev. In 1970, they dropped to the fourth tier, but the following year were brought back to the third, both times due to further league reorganizations. In 1973, the club adopted their current name, Dnepr Mogilev. Dnepr would spend all subsequent Soviet-era seasons in the third-tier league, with one exception. In 1982, Anatoly Baidachny led Dnepr to win their zone and then the final round between the zone winners and promotion to the Soviet First League. However, the club couldn't maintain their second-tier spot and relegated the following year.

In 1992, Dnepr joined the newly created Belarusian Premier League. The team's results in the post-Soviet years varied from runners-up in 1992 and champions in 1998 to the unfortunate relegation in 2011. Since then, Dnepr has come back and was relegated again in 2014. As of 2015, Dnepr is playing in the Belarusian First League.

In spring 2019, the club merged with Premier League team Luch Minsk, citing the willingness to keep the city of Mogilev represented in the top flight. The united club was named Dnyapro Mogilev. It inherited Luch's Premier League spot and licence, their sponsorships and most of the squad while keeping only a few Dnepr players and relocating to Mogilev. Dnepr continued its participation in youth tournaments independently from Luch.

In 2020, Dnepr Mogilev reformed and joined the Second League after Dnyapro Mogilev ceased to exist following their relegation from the Premier League.

=== Name changes ===
- 1960: founded as Khimik Mogilev (Belarusian: Хімік)
- 1963: renamed to Spartak Mogilev
- 1973: renamed to Dnepr Mogilev
- 1998: absorbed Transmash Mogilev and renamed to Dnepr-Transmash Mogilev (Дняпро-Трансмаш, Dniapro-Transmash)
- 2006: renamed to Dnepr Mogilev
- 2019: merged with Luch Minsk into Dnyapro Mogilev
- 2020: reestablished as Dnepr Mogilev

== Honours ==
- Belarusian Premier League
  - Winners (1): 1998
  - Runners-up (1): 1992
  - 3rd place (1): 2009
- Belarusian Cup
  - Runners-up (1): 1992
- Belarusian First League
  - Winners (1): 2012

== Current squad ==
As of 25 August 2026

Note: Flags indicate national team as defined under FIFA eligibility rules; some limited exceptions apply. Players may hold more than one non-FIFA nationality.

No.	Pos.	Nation	Player
3	DF	SRB	Nenad Perović
5	DF	RUS	Artyom Varganov
7	FW	BLR	Muzaffar Gurbanov
8	MF	BLR	Sergey Rusak
9	MF	BLR	Erik Torosyan
10	FW	BLR	Kirill Zabelin
11	MF	BLR	Dmitry Lisakovich
13	DF	BLR	Ilya Maksimkov
15	DF	BLR	Maksim Kasarab (on loan from Dynamo Brest)
17	MF	BLR	Andrey Potapenko
18	DF	BLR	Aleksandr Mikhalenko
21	FW	BLR	Yegor Karpitsky (on loan from Krylia Sovetov Samara)
22	GK	BLR	Nikita Sednev
23	DF	BLR	Aleksey Dunayev
26	DF	BLR	Fedor Yurkevich

No.	Pos.	Nation	Player
27	MF	BLR	Roman Piletsky
29	MF	BLR	Andrey Denisyuk (on loan from Dinamo Minsk)
33	GK	BLR	Andrey Sinenko
37	MF	BLR	Kirill Tsepenkov
55	MF	BLR	Nikita Krasnov
66	FW	RUS	Nikita Tereshchuk (on loan from Leningradets)
71	MF	BLR	Daniil Zhabrakov
74	DF	RUS	David Cherkasov
77	GK	BLR	Dzmitry Hushchanka
88	MF	BLR	Kirill Kirilenko
89	MF	ARM	Vadim Harutyunyan
99	FW	BLR	Vladislav Stepanenko
—	GK	BLR	Andrey Ignatovich
—	FW	BLR	Arseny Gribovsky

=== Out on loan ===
Note: Flags indicate national team as defined under FIFA eligibility rules; some limited exceptions apply. Players may hold more than one non-FIFA nationality.

No.	Pos.	Nation	Player
47	MF	BLR	Gleb Malashenko (at Smorgon)

== League and Cup history ==
=== Soviet Union ===
Season	Level	Pos	Pld	W	D	L	Goals	Points	Domestic Cup	Notes
1960	2nd	13	30	5	10	15	36–54	20		
1961	2nd	4	30	14	8	8	45–37	36	Round of 256	
1962	2nd	6	32	13	10	9	35–32	36	Round of 256	Relegated^{1}
1963	3rd	11	30	8	11	11	21–33	27	Round of 512	
1964	3rd	8	30	12	8	10	31–25	32	Round of 2048	
1965	3rd	10	30	6	17	7	14–18	29	Round of 256	
1966	3rd	9	32	10	10	12	25–33	30		
1967	3rd	18	34	6	10	18	18–38	22	Round of 4096	
1968	3rd	10	38	11	14	13	25–28	36	Round of 256	
1969	3rd	7	32	12	11	9	37–23	35	Round of 16	Relegated^{2}
1970	4th	3	32	19	5	8	34–19	43		Promoted^{3}
1971	3rd	14	38	9	16	13	30–40	43		
1972	3rd	17	38	9	13	16	25–47	40		
1973	3rd	16	32	7	11	14	21–38	17^{4}		
1974	3rd	12	40	14	10	16	37–53	38		
1975	3rd	11	34	8	13	13	26–42	29		
1976	3rd	19	38	8	9	21	34–60	25		
1977	3rd	12	40	15	11	14	44–41	41		
1978	3rd	16	46	15	10	21	51–56	40		
1979	3rd	17	46	12	13	21	41–62	37		
1980	3rd	7	32	9	9	14	37–48	27		
1981	3rd	2	38	20	5	13	58–39	45		
1982	3rd	1	30	18	8	4	60–32	44		
1982	3rd	1	4	3	0	1	8–4	6		Final round, promoted
1983	2nd	20	42	12	13	17	40–60	36	Round of 64	Relegated
1984	3rd	1	34	22	6	6	71–24	50	Round of 32	
1985	3rd	3	30	15	9	6	64–34	39	Round of 64	
1986	3rd	5	30	15	5	10	56–31	35	Round of 128	
1987	3rd	6	34	17	8	9	41–29	42	Round of 32	
1988	3rd	4	34	19	8	7	49–36	46		
1989	3rd	9	42	19	7	16	52–47	45		
1990	3rd	13	42	17	6	19	58–54	40	Round of 64	
1991	3rd	12	42	18	6	18	47–37	42		
1992									Round of 64	

- ^{1} Relegated due second level reduction from 10 zones (150 teams) in 1962 to a single group of 18 teams in 1963
- ^{2} Relegated as Class B changed its status from 3rd to 4th level in 1970, and the top two levels were reorganized into three with fewer teams.
- ^{3} Promoted due to 3rd level (Class A Second Group, renamed to Second League since next season) expansion from 3 to 6 territorial zones (from 66 to 124 teams) in 1971 and dismissal of 4th level.
- ^{4} In 1973, every draw was followed by a penalty shoot-out, with a winner gaining 1 point and loser gaining 0.

=== Belarus ===
Season	Level	Pos	Pld	W	D	L	Goals	Points	Domestic Cup	Notes
1992	1st	2	15	11	2	2	28–4	24	Runners-up	
1992–93	1st	5	32	17	7	8	54–33	41	Quarter-finals	
1993–94	1st	4	30	17	6	7	45–22	40	Round of 16	
1994–95	1st	5	30	12	9	9	44–35	33	Semi-finals	
1995	1st	6	15	7	1	7	26–23	22	Round of 16	
1996	1st	9	30	11	6	13	33–36	39	Round of 16	
1997	1st	4	30	15	7	8	48–32	52	Semi-finals	
1998	1st	1	28	21	4	3	55–12	67	Semi-finals	
1999	1st	4	30	17	9	4	53–27	60	Quarter-finals	
2000	1st	7	30	14	7	9	55–33	49	Round of 16	
2001	1st	9	26	8	7	11	29–37	31	Round of 16	
2002	1st	9	26	10	6	10	38–37	36	Round of 16	
2003	1st	9	30	8	10	12	38–46	34	Quarter-finals	
2004	1st	9	30	11	4	15	29–37	37	Round of 16	
2005	1st	6	26	12	7	7	48–36	43	Quarter-finals	
2006	1st	12	26	6	5	15	29–47	23	Round of 32	
2007	1st	13	26	5	8	13	21–33	23	Round of 16	
2008	1st	9	30	9	11	10	45–42	38	Quarter-finals	
2009	1st	3	26	12	4	10	31–26	40	Round of 32	
2010	1st	8	33	11	7	15	40–53	40	Round of 16	
2011	1st	12	33	6	14	13	29–51	32	Round of 32	Relegated
2012	2nd	1	28	20	3	5	75–22	63	Round of 32	Promoted
2013	1st	11	32	9	6	17	28–42	33	Round of 16	
2014	1st	12	32	2	14	16	19–42	20	Semi-finals	Relegated via play-off
2015	2nd	4	30	17	5	8	48–21	56	Round of 16	
2016	2nd	2	26	20	4	2	61–19	63	Round of 32	Promoted
2017	1st	12	30	6	8	16	27–48	26	First round	
2018	1st	16	30	3	7	20	17–53	16	Semi-finals	Relegated
2019									Round of 32	
2020	3rd								-	

1. One point deducted due to financial irregularities

== Dnepr Mogilev in Europe ==
Season	Competition	Round		Club	1st Leg	2nd Leg
1995	UEFA Intertoto Cup	Group 8	(Federal Republic of Yugoslavia)	Bečej	2–1 (H)	
1995	UEFA Intertoto Cup	Group 8	(Poland)	Pogoń Szczecin	3–3 (A)	
1995	UEFA Intertoto Cup	Group 8	(France)	Cannes	2–2 (H)	
1995	UEFA Intertoto Cup	Group 8	(Romania)	Farul Constanţa	0–2 (A)	
1998	UEFA Intertoto Cup	1R	(Hungary)	Debrecen	2–4 (H)	0–6 (A)
1999–2000	UEFA Champions League	2R	(Sweden)	AIK	0–1 (H)	0–2 (A)
2000	UEFA Intertoto Cup	1R	(Denmark)	Silkeborg	2–1 (H)	2–1 (A)
2000	UEFA Intertoto Cup	2R	(Czech Republic)	Chmel Blšany	2–6 (A)	0–2 (H)
2010–11	UEFA Europa League	1Q	(Albania)	Laçi	1–1 (A)	7–1 (H)
2010–11	UEFA Europa League	2Q	(Norway)	Stabæk	2–2 (A)	1–1 (H)
2010–11	UEFA Europa League	3Q	(Czech Republic)	Baník Ostrava	1–0 (H)	2–1 (A)
2010–11	UEFA Europa League	Play-off	(Spain)	Villareal	0–5 (A)	1–2 (H)

== Managers ==
- (Soviet Union) Anatoly Baidachny (30 November 1979 – 30 November 1984)
- (Belarus) Valery Streltsov (1986–93), (1994–95)
- (Belarus) Vladimir Kostyukov (1995)
- (Belarus) Valery Streltsov (1995–03), (2003 – 13 April 2006)
- (Belarus) Vladimir Kostyukov (11 April 2006 – 22 June 2007)
- (Belarus) Vladimir Brezhezinskiy (23 June 2007 – 22 July 2007)
- (Belarus) Valery Streltsov (23 July 2007 – 7 July 2008)
- (Belarus) Andrey Skorobogatko (8 July 2008 – 31 August 2011)
- (Belarus) Vyacheslav Gerashchenko (3 September 2011 – 1 October 2013)
- (Belarus) Vladimir Kostyukov (2 October 2013 – 26 January 2014)
- (Belarus) Yury Lukashov (27 January 2014–)
