= 2023 UEFA European Under-17 Championship qualification =

Tournament details
- Dates: Qualifying round: 5 October – 22 November 2022; Elite round: 7 – 28 March 2023
- Teams: 53 (from 1 confederation)

Tournament statistics
- Matches played: 123
- Goals scored: 448 (3.64 per match)
- Top scorer(s): (Ukraine) Matviy Ponomarenko (8 goals)

The 2023 UEFA European Under-17 Championship qualifying competition was a men's under-17 football competition that determined the 15 teams joining the automatically qualified hosts Hungary in the 2023 UEFA European Under-17 Championship final tournament. Players born on or after 1 January 2006 were eligible to participate.

Apart from Hungary as the host, the remaining 53 teams entered the qualifying competition, where the format consisted of two rounds: Qualifying round, which took place in October and November 2022, and Elite round, which took place in March 2023.

== Format ==
The qualifying competition consisted of the following two rounds:

- Qualifying round: Apart from Netherlands and Spain, which received byes to the elite round as the teams with the highest seeding coefficient, the remaining 52 teams were drawn into 13 groups of four teams. Each group was played in single round-robin format at one of the teams selected as hosts after the draw. The 13 group winners, the 13 runners-up, and the four third-placed teams with the best record against the first and second-placed teams in their group advanced to the elite round.
- Elite round: The 32 teams were drawn into eight groups of four teams. Each group was played in single round-robin format at one of the teams selected as hosts after the draw. The eight group winners and the seven runners-up with the best record against all teams in their group qualified for the final tournament.

The schedule of each group was as follows, with two rest days between each matchday (Regulations Article 20.04):

Group schedule
Matchday	Matches
Matchday 1	1 v 4, 3 v 2
Matchday 2	1 v 3, 2 v 4
Matchday 3	2 v 1, 4 v 3

=== Tiebreakers ===
In the qualifying round and elite round, teams were ranked according to points (3 points for a win, 1 point for a draw, 0 points for a loss), and if tied on points, the following tiebreaking criteria were applied, in the order given, to determine the rankings (Regulations Articles 14.01 and 14.02):

1. Points in head-to-head matches among tied teams;
2. Goal difference in head-to-head matches among tied teams;
3. Goals scored in head-to-head matches among tied teams;
4. If more than two teams are tied, and after applying all head-to-head criteria above, a subset of teams are still tied, all head-to-head criteria above are reapplied exclusively to this subset of teams;
5. Goal difference in all group matches;
6. Goals scored in all group matches;
7. Penalty shoot-out if only two teams have the same number of points, and they met in the last round of the group and are tied after applying all criteria above (not used if more than two teams have the same number of points, or if their rankings are not relevant for qualification for the next stage);
8. Disciplinary points (red card = 3 points, yellow card = 1 point, expulsion for two yellow cards in one match = 3 points);
9. UEFA coefficient ranking for the qualifying round draw;
10. Drawing of lots.

To determine the four best third-placed teams from the qualifying round, the results against the teams in fourth place were discarded. The following criteria were applied (Regulations Articles 15.01 and 15.03):

1. Points;
2. Goal difference;
3. Goals scored;
4. Disciplinary points (total 3 matches);
5. UEFA coefficient ranking for the qualifying round draw;
6. Drawing of lots.

To determine the seven best runners-up from the elite round, all results were considered. The same criteria as above were applied (Regulations Articles 15.02 and 15.03).

== Qualifying round ==
=== Draw ===
The draw for the qualifying round was held on 17 December 2021 at the UEFA headquarters in Nyon, Switzerland.

The teams were seeded according to their coefficient ranking, calculated based on the following:

- 2016 UEFA European Under-17 Championship final tournament and qualifying competition (qualifying round and elite round)
- 2017 UEFA European Under-17 Championship final tournament and qualifying competition (qualifying round and elite round)
- 2018 UEFA European Under-17 Championship final tournament and qualifying competition (qualifying round and elite round)
- 2019 UEFA European Under-17 Championship final tournament and qualifying competition (qualifying round and elite round)

Each group contained one team from Pot A, one team from Pot B, one team from Pot C, and one team from Pot D. Based on the decisions taken by the UEFA Emergency Panel, the following pairs of teams could not be drawn in the same group: Serbia and Kosovo, Bosnia and Herzegovina and Kosovo, Azerbaijan and Armenia.

Final tournament hosts
Team	Coeff.	Rank
**Hungary**	14.389	—

Bye to elite round
Team	Coeff.	Rank
Netherlands	28.556	1
Spain	27.444	2

Teams entering qualifying round

Pot A
Team	Coeff.	Rank
**England**	23.056	3
**Italy**	22.667	4
**Portugal**	20.722	5
**Germany**	19.833	6
**France**	18.944	7
**Belgium**	18.556	8
**Republic of Ireland**	16.833	9
Sweden	15.278	10
Austria	13.556	11
**Serbia**	13.278	12
**Turkey**	12.667	13
**Bosnia and Herzegovina**	12.333	14
**Scotland**	12.000	15

Pot B
Team	Coeff.	Rank
**Ukraine**	11.889	16
**Czech Republic**	11.722	17
**Israel**	11.167	18
**Switzerland**	11.111	19
**Denmark**	11.000	20
**Norway**	10.722	21
Russia	10.667	22
Greece	10.222	23
**Slovenia**	10.111	24
**Poland**	10.000	25
**Croatia**	9.833	26
**Slovakia**	9.333	27
**Iceland**	8.167	28

Pot C
Team	Coeff.	Rank
**Finland**	7.833	29
**Cyprus**	6.167	30
**Belarus**	5.500	31
Romania	5.333	32
Azerbaijan	5.333	33
North Macedonia	4.833	34
**Montenegro**	4.667	35
**Wales**	4.500	36
Georgia	4.333	37
**Northern Ireland**	4.167	38
Bulgaria	4.000	39
**Latvia**	3.000	40
Faroe Islands	2.889	41

Pot D
Team	Coeff.	Rank
Lithuania	2.667	42
**Albania**	2.333	43
Estonia	2.333	44
Armenia	2.000	45
Kazakhstan	2.000	46
Kosovo	2.000	47
Andorra	1.333	48
Liechtenstein	1.000	49
Moldova	0.667	50
Luxembourg	0.667	51
San Marino	0.333	52
Malta	0.000	53
Gibraltar	0.000	54

Notes

- Teams marked in **bold** have qualified for the final tournament.

=== Groups ===
The qualifying round was played in October and November 2022.

Times up to 30 October 2022 are CEST (UTC+2), thereafter times are CET (UTC+1), as listed by UEFA (local times, if different, are in parentheses).

==== Group 1 ====
Pos	Team	Pld	W	D	L	GF	GA	GD	Pts	Qualification
1	Portugal (H)	3	3	0	0	11	1	+10	**9**	Elite round
2	Slovenia	3	1	1	1	2	2	0	**4**	Elite round
3	Kazakhstan	3	1	1	1	4	6	−2	**4**	
4	Faroe Islands	3	0	0	3	0	8	−8	**0**	

Source: UEFA
Rules for classification: Tiebreakers
(H) Hosts
16 November 2022
15:00

Faroe Islands	0–2	Slovenia
	Report	Topalović 2'; Kutoš 83'

Albufeira Municipal Stadium, Albufeira
Referee: Miloš Gigovic (Bosnia and Herzegovina)
16 November 2022
18:00

Portugal	6–1	Kazakhstan
Oliveira 24'; Martins 65'; Patrício 71' (pen.), 77'; Moreira 74'; Lobão 85'	Report	Agimanov 53' (pen.)

Estádio Algarve, Faro-Loulé
Referee: Jakob Alexander Sundberg (Denmark)

19 November 2022
15:00

Slovenia	0–0	Kazakhstan
	Report

Albufeira Municipal Stadium, Albufeira
Referee: Miloš Gigovic (Bosnia and Herzegovina)
19 November 2022
18:00

Portugal	3–0	Faroe Islands
Moreira 18'; Patrício 45+1'; Tomé 58'	Report

Estádio Municipal da Bela Vista, Parchal
Referee: Tomas Klima (Czech Republic)

22 November 2022
18:00

Kazakhstan	3–0	Faroe Islands
Agimanov 32' (pen.), 80'; Myngbay 69'	Report

Albufeira Municipal Stadium, Albufeira
Referee: Tomas Klima (Czech Republic)
22 November 2022
18:00

Slovenia	0–2	Portugal
	Report	Simões 38'; Tomé 70'

Estádio Algarve, Faro-Loulé
Referee: Jakob Alexander Sundberg (Denmark)

==== Group 2 ====
Pos	Team	Pld	W	D	L	GF	GA	GD	Pts	Qualification
1	Ukraine	3	2	1	0	13	3	+10	**7**	Elite round
2	Bosnia and Herzegovina (H)	3	2	1	0	4	1	+3	**7**	Elite round
3	Azerbaijan	3	1	0	2	10	6	+4	**3**	
4	Liechtenstein	3	0	0	3	0	17	−17	**0**	

Source: UEFA
Rules for classification: Tiebreakers
(H) Hosts
24 October 2022
13:30

Azerbaijan	2–5	Ukraine
H. Hüseynov 77'; Mur. Mammadov 83' (pen.)	Report	Ponomarenko 33' (pen.), 39', 59', 68'; Osypenko 90'

Mladost Stadium, Kakanj
Referee: Miguel Nogueira (Portugal)
24 October 2022
13:30

Bosnia and Herzegovina	2–0	Liechtenstein
Marčetić 8', 16'	Report

FF BH Football Training Centre, Zenica
Referee: Tim Marshall (Northern Ireland)

27 October 2022
13:30

Ukraine	7–0	Liechtenstein
Ponomarenko 13', 21', 45+1' (pen.); Kalyn 30'; Pashko 62'; Zakharchenko 67'; Khan 88'	Report

FF BH Football Training Centre, Zenica
Referee: Tim Marshall (Northern Ireland)
27 October 2022
13:30

Bosnia and Herzegovina	1–0	Azerbaijan
Dugić 16'	Report

Mladost Stadium, Kakanj
Referee: Eldorjan Hamiti (Albania)

30 October 2022
13:30

Liechtenstein	0–8	Azerbaijan
	Report	Mikayılov 4'; Mur. Mammadov 6'; Jafarli 38'; Tarverdiyev 41'; Osmanov 43', 50'; Alakbarli 51'; Mansumov 76'

Mladost Stadium, Kakanj
Referee: Eldorjan Hamiti (Albania)
30 October 2022
13:30

Ukraine	1–1	Bosnia and Herzegovina
Pashko 66'	Report	Brekalo 81'

FF BH Football Training Centre, Zenica
Referee: Miguel Nogueira (Portugal)

==== Group 3 ====
Pos	Team	Pld	W	D	L	GF	GA	GD	Pts	Qualification
1	England	3	2	1	0	10	4	+6	**7**	Elite round
2	Israel	3	1	2	0	5	3	+2	**5**	Elite round
3	Georgia (H)	3	1	0	2	6	9	−3	**3**	
4	Lithuania	3	0	1	2	2	7	−5	**1**	

Source: UEFA
Rules for classification: Tiebreakers
(H) Hosts
25 October 2022
13:00 (15:00 UTC+4)

England	3–1	Lithuania
Golding 17', 51'; Nwaneri 81'	Report	Malatokas 80'

Tbilisi Sea Technical Center Stadium, Tbilisi
Referee: Adam Ladebäck (Sweden)
25 October 2022
16:00 (18:00 UTC+4)

Georgia	1–3	Israel
Turkia 25'	Report	Sarsur 17'; Oli 45'; Ranon 83'

GFF Rustavi Academy, Rustavi
Referee: Ferenc Karakó (Hungary)

28 October 2022
13:00 (15:00 UTC+4)

Israel	1–1	Lithuania
Zoabi 37'	Report	Jonaitis 6'

Tbilisi Sea Technical Center Stadium, Tbilisi
Referee: Ferenc Karakó (Hungary)
28 October 2022
16:00 (18:00 UTC+4)

England	6–2	Georgia
Dibling 3', 87'; Nwaneri 9'; Morgan 28', 57'; Lewis-Skelly 43'	Report	Geguchadze 7' (pen.); Amisulashvili 60'

GFF Rustavi Academy, Rustavi
Referee: Viktor Kopiievskyi (Ukraine)

31 October 2022
15:00 (17:00 UTC+4)

Lithuania	0–3	Georgia
	Report	Mashava 32'; Odikadze 83', 89'

GFF Rustavi Academy, Rustavi
Referee: Adam Ladebäck (Sweden)
31 October 2022
15:00 (17:00 UTC+4)

Israel	1–1	England
Hazan 34'	Report	Morgan 83'

Tbilisi Sea Technical Center Stadium, Tbilisi
Referee: Viktor Kopiievskyi (Ukraine)

==== Group 4 ====
Pos	Team	Pld	W	D	L	GF	GA	GD	Pts	Qualification
1	Czech Republic	3	2	1	0	11	2	+9	**7**	Elite round
2	Scotland	3	2	0	1	10	5	+5	**6**	Elite round
3	Northern Ireland	3	1	1	1	3	5	−2	**4**	Elite round
4	Malta (H)	3	0	0	3	1	13	−12	**0**	

Source: UEFA
Rules for classification: Tiebreakers
(H) Hosts
19 October 2022
11:00

Scotland	6–0	Malta
Allan-Molotnikov 28'; McLuckie 48'; Wilson 62', 63'; MacIntyre 70', 90+1'	Report

Centenary Stadium, Ta' Qali
Referee: Evangelos Manouchos (Greece)
19 October 2022
16:00

Northern Ireland	1–1	Czech Republic
Patton 64'	Report	Pikolon 55'

Centenary Stadium, Ta' Qali
Referee: Martin Dohal (Slovakia)

22 October 2022
11:00

Scotland	3–0	Northern Ireland
Wilson 26', 28'; MacIntyre 72'	Report

Centenary Stadium, Ta' Qali
Referee: Evangelos Manouchos (Greece)
22 October 2022
16:00

Czech Republic	5–0	Malta
Binar 43' (pen.); Hranoš 47', 51', 90+1'; Branecký 90+4'	Report

Centenary Stadium, Ta' Qali
Referee: Visar Kastrati (Kosovo)

25 October 2022
11:00

Czech Republic	5–1	Scotland
Pikolon 13'; Hranoš 41'; Pech 54'; Konečný 80'; Rus 89'	Report	Hutton 19'

Centenary Stadium, Ta' Qali
Referee: Martin Dohal (Slovakia)
25 October 2022
16:00

Malta	1–2	Northern Ireland
Melillo 40'	Report	Moreland 78'; Donnelly 87'

Centenary Stadium, Ta' Qali
Referee: Visar Kastrati (Kosovo)

==== Group 5 ====
Pos	Team	Pld	W	D	L	GF	GA	GD	Pts	Qualification
1	Montenegro	3	2	1	0	4	1	+3	**7**	Elite round
2	Poland (H)	3	2	0	1	10	5	+5	**6**	Elite round
3	Austria	3	1	0	2	4	5	−1	**3**	
4	Andorra	3	0	1	2	2	9	−7	**1**	

Source: UEFA
Rules for classification: Tiebreakers
(H) Hosts
20 October 2022
15:00

Montenegro	2–0	Poland
Camaj 6'; Maraš 25'	Report

Stadion Miejski Szubin, Szubin
Referee: David Fuxman (Israel)
20 October 2022
15:00

Austria	2–0	Andorra
Živković 42' (pen.); Lukic 48' (pen.)	Report

Stadium im. G. Duneckiego, Toruń
Referee: Bulat Sariyev (Kazakhstan)

23 October 2022
15:00

Poland	6–1	Andorra
Tomczyk 16' (pen.), 25', 29'; Mikołajewski 60', 66'; Huras 76'	Report	Acosta 63'

Stadion Miejski im. Inowrocławskich Olimpijczyków, Inowrocław
Referee: Tom Owen (Wales)
23 October 2022
15:00

Austria	0–1	Montenegro
	Report	Adžić 36'

Stadion Miejski Szubin, Szubin
Referee: Bulat Sariyev (Kazakhstan)

26 October 2022
15:00

Andorra	1–1	Montenegro
García Suñé 83'	Report	Đukanović 90+7'

Stadion Miejski im. Inowrocławskich Olimpijczyków, Inowrocław
Referee: Tom Owen (Wales)
26 October 2022
15:00

Poland	4–2	Austria
Tomczyk 22', 30', 79'; Krzyżanowski 48'	Report	Feiner 16'; Verhounig 29'

Stadium im. G. Duneckiego, Toruń
Referee: David Fuxman (Israel)

==== Group 6 ====
Pos	Team	Pld	W	D	L	GF	GA	GD	Pts	Qualification
1	Belgium	3	3	0	0	10	3	+7	**9**	Elite round
2	Denmark	3	2	0	1	13	3	+10	**6**	Elite round
3	Romania (H)	3	1	0	2	4	8	−4	**3**	
4	Estonia	3	0	0	3	3	16	−13	**0**	

Source: UEFA
Rules for classification: Tiebreakers
(H) Hosts
26 October 2022
12:00 (13:00 EEST)

Belgium	4–1	Estonia
de Meyer 39'; Gérard 62' di Matteo 82'; Bounida 87'	Report	Kalimullin 78'

Football Centre FRF, Buftea
Referee: Henrik Nalbandyan (Armenia)
26 October 2022
17:00 (18:00 EEST)

Romania	0–3	Denmark
	Report	Jensen 77'; Chiakha 81'; Mikkelsen 90+3'

Football Centre FRF, Buftea
Referee: Daniel Schlager (Germany)

29 October 2022
12:00 (13:00 EEST)

Denmark	8–0	Estonia
Chiakha 5', 27', 28'; Jensen 39'; Jørgensen 46'; Andersen 62'; Mikkelsen 87', 89' (pen.)	Report

Football Centre FRF, Buftea
Referee: Daniel Schlager (Germany)
29 October 2022
17:00 (18:00 EEST)

Belgium	3–0	Romania
Mirisola 45+2'; Filorizzo 65', 82'	Report

Football Centre FRF, Buftea
Referee: Miloš Savović (Montenegro)

1 November 2022
14:00 (15:00 EEST)

Estonia	2–4	Romania
Suppi 9'; Kalimullin 48'	Report	Tarbă 25', 34'; Păcuraru 45'; Cocoș 88'

Football Centre FRF, Buftea
Referee: Miloš Savović (Montenegro)
1 November 2022
14:00 (15:00 EEST)

Denmark	2–3	Belgium
Høgsberg 11'; Chiakha 36'	Report	Mateta Pepa 44'; Nuozzi 46', 52'

Pitch Nr 5 - “Steaua” sports complex, Bucharest
Referee: Henrik Nalbandyan (Armenia)

==== Group 7 ====
Pos	Team	Pld	W	D	L	GF	GA	GD	Pts	Qualification
1	Wales	3	1	2	0	5	3	+2	**5**	Elite round
2	Croatia (H)	3	1	1	1	3	4	−1	**4 (Note: Ranked on head-to-head: Croatia 1–0 Albania.)**	Elite round
3	Albania	3	1	1	1	3	2	+1	**4**	Elite round
4	Sweden	3	0	2	1	6	8	−2	**2**	

Source: UEFA
Rules for classification: Tiebreakers
(H) Hosts
Notes:
20 October 2022
11:00

Sweden	1–3	Albania
Smajic 14'	Report	Vraniçi 29', 81'; Kashari 73'

Gradski Stadion "Laco", Novigrad
Referee: Chrysovalantis Theouli (Cyprus)
20 October 2022
13:00

Wales	2–0	Croatia
Hatch 12'; Perret 36'	Report

Stadion Veli Jože, Poreč
Referee: Rauf Jabarov (Azerbaijan)

23 October 2022
11:00

Sweden	3–3	Wales
Samuyiwa 27'; Alemayehu Mulugeta 37'; Lawlor 63' (o.g.)	Report	Hatch 41'; Issaka 79'; Giles 90+9'

Gradski Stadion "Laco", Novigrad
Referee: Oleksii Derevinskyi (Ukraine)
23 October 2022
13:00

Croatia	1–0	Albania
Živković 90+1'	Report

Stadion Veli Jože, Poreč
Referee: Rauf Jabarov (Azerbaijan)

26 October 2022
13:00

Albania	0–0	Wales
	Report

Gradski Stadion "Laco", Novigrad
Referee: Oleksii Derevinskyi (Ukraine)
26 October 2022
13:00

Croatia	2–2	Sweden
Vušković 3'; Rimac 17'	Report	Samuyiwa 41'; Mohudin 60'

Stadion Veli Jože, Poreč
Referee: Chrysovalantis Theouli (Cyprus)

==== Group 8 ====
Pos	Team	Pld	W	D	L	GF	GA	GD	Pts	Qualification
1	Italy	3	3	0	0	11	2	+9	**9**	Elite round
2	Finland	3	1	1	1	3	6	−3	**4**	Elite round
3	Greece	3	1	0	2	6	4	+2	**3**	
4	Kosovo (H)	3	0	1	2	3	11	−8	**1**	

Source: UEFA
Rules for classification: Tiebreakers
(H) Hosts
5 October 2022
13:00

Finland	2–1	Greece
Ruoppi 21'; Ezeh 32' (pen.)	Report	Tzimas 42'

Zahir Pajaziti Stadium, Podujevo
Referee: Luca Cibelli (Switzerland)
5 October 2022
16:00

Italy	5–2	Kosovo
Pafundi 26', 63'; Finocchiaro 48'; Scotti 49'; Mannini 82'	Report	Gashijan 76'; Mulaj 84'

Fadil Vokrri Stadium, Pristina
Referee: Elchin Masiyev (Azerbaijan)

8 October 2022
13:00

Greece	5–0	Kosovo
Panikidis 7'; Tzimas 32', 73'; Politakis 85'; Mouzakitis 90'	Report

Zahir Pajaziti Stadium, Podujevo
Referee: Luca Cibelli (Switzerland)
8 October 2022
16:00

Italy	4–0	Finland
Romano 15'; Ragnoli Galli 21'; Pafundi 23'; Leveälahti 55' (o.g.)	Report

Fadil Vokrri Stadium, Pristina
Referee: Ondřej Berka (Czech Republic)

11 October 2022
13:00

Kosovo	1–1	Finland
Lleshi 6' (pen.)	Report	Boström 87'

Fadil Vokrri Stadium, Pristina
Referee: Elchin Masiyev (Azerbaijan)
11 October 2022
13:00

Greece	0–2	Italy
	Report	Romano 45+3'; Pafundi 48'

Zahir Pajaziti Stadium, Podujevo
Referee: Ondřej Berka (Czech Republic)

==== Group 9 ====
Pos	Team	Pld	W	D	L	GF	GA	GD	Pts	Qualification
1	France	3	3	0	0	12	0	+12	**9**	Elite round
2	Iceland	3	2	0	1	6	5	+1	**6**	Elite round
3	Luxembourg	3	1	0	2	4	9	−5	**3**	
4	North Macedonia (H)	3	0	0	3	2	10	−8	**0**	

Source: UEFA
Rules for classification: Tiebreakers
(H) Hosts
25 October 2022
14:00

North Macedonia	0–3	Iceland
	Report	Kjartansson 25'; Gudjohnsen 30', 48'

Petar Miloševski Training Centre, Skopje
Referee: Dzmitry Dzmitryieu (Belarus)
25 October 2022
14:00

France	4–0	Luxembourg
Amougou 46'; Kroupi 54'; Bouchenna 61'; Lambourde 90'	Report

Gjorče Petrov Stadium, Skopje
Referee: Jan Petrik (Czech Republic)

28 October 2022
14:00

Iceland	3–1	Luxembourg
Gudjohnsen 47'; Þorbjörnsson 70', 74'	Report	Mancini 49'

Gjorče Petrov Stadium, Skopje
Referee: Jan Petrik (Czech Republic)
28 October 2022
14:00

France	4–0	North Macedonia
Kroupi 22'; Bouneb 26'; Lambourde 71'; Meupiyou 79'	Report

Petar Miloševski Training Centre, Skopje
Referee: Aleksandrs Anufrijevs (Latvia)

31 October 2022
14:00

Luxembourg	3–2	North Macedonia
Federspiel 36', 40', 90+2'	Report	Elmas 4'; Mladenovski 79'

Petar Miloševski Training Centre, Skopje
Referee: Dzmitry Dzmitryieu (Belarus)
31 October 2022
14:00

Iceland	0–4	France
	Report	Traore 15'; Bouneb 38'; Lambourde 87', 90+1'

Gjorče Petrov Stadium, Skopje
Referee: Aleksandrs Anufrijevs (Latvia)

==== Group 10 ====
Pos	Team	Pld	W	D	L	GF	GA	GD	Pts	Qualification
1	Norway (H)	3	2	1	0	12	1	+11	**7**	Elite round
2	Republic of Ireland	3	1	2	0	7	3	+4	**5**	Elite round
3	Belarus	3	1	1	1	7	8	−1	**4**	Elite round
4	Armenia	3	0	0	3	2	16	−14	**0**	

Source: UEFA
Rules for classification: Tiebreakers
(H) Hosts
20 October 2022
13:00

Belarus	0–4	Norway
	Report	Kjølstad Nyheim 17'; Walle Egeli 46', 84'; Temesgen Tewelde 87'

Sarpsborg Stadion, Sarpsborg
Referee: Jan Machálek (Czech Republic)
20 October 2022
18:00

Republic of Ireland	4–0	Armenia
Akachukwu 51'; Melia 78'; Razi 81' (pen.); Grante 86'	Report

Sarpsborg Stadion, Sarpsborg
Referee: Miloš Bošković (Montenegro)

23 October 2022
13:00

Republic of Ireland	2–2	Belarus
Kehir 35'; Wade 51'	Report	Mokin 17'; Simanenka 77'

Fredrikstad Stadion, Fredrikstad
Referee: Miloš Bošković (Montenegro)
23 October 2022
18:00

Norway	7–0	Armenia
Temesgen Tewelde 5', 37'; Walle Egeli 26', 30', 32' (pen.); Vanoyan 61' (o.g.); Thorvaldsen 74'	Report

Fredrikstad Stadion, Fredrikstad
Referee: Joey Kooij (Netherlands)

26 October 2022
17:00

Armenia	2–5	Belarus
Harutyunyan 46'; Mikhaelyan 79'	Report	Sakhonchyk 38'; Mokin 43', 59'; Myalkovskiy 72' (pen.); Baranok 90+5' (pen.)

Fredrikstad Stadion, Fredrikstad
Referee: Joey Kooij (Netherlands)
26 October 2022
17:00

Norway	1–1	Republic of Ireland
Temesgen Tewelde 29'	Report	Okosun 36'

Sarpsborg Stadion, Sarpsborg
Referee: Jan Machálek (Czech Republic)

==== Group 11 ====
Pos	Team	Pld	W	D	L	GF	GA	GD	Pts	Qualification
1	Serbia	2	2	0	0	15	1	+14	**6**	Elite round
2	Cyprus (H)	2	1	0	1	3	3	0	**3**	Elite round
3	Gibraltar	2	0	0	2	0	14	−14	**0**	
4	Russia	0	0	0	0	0	0	0	**0**	Banned due to the invasion of Ukraine

Source: UEFA
Rules for classification: Tiebreakers
(H) Hosts
1 November 2022
13:30 (14:30 EET)

Gibraltar	0–2	Cyprus
	Report	Nikolaou 48'; Tzouliou 56'

Stelios Kyriakides Stadium, Paphos
Attendance: 125
Referee: Sander van der Eijk (Netherlands)

4 November 2022
11:00 (12:00 EET)

Serbia	12–0	Gibraltar
Delibašić 7', 44'; Jovanović 13', 46', 82'; Cvetković 25', 31'; Maksimović 68' (pen.); Sremčević 79', 86' (pen.), 90', 90+2'	Report

Stelios Kyriakides Stadium, Paphos
Attendance: 31
Referee: Alessandro Dudic (Switzerland)

7 November 2022
11:00 (12:00 EET)

Cyprus	1–3	Serbia
Tzouliou 26' (pen.)	Report	Maksimović 21'; Vukojević 41'; Petrović 90+6' (pen.)

Geroskipou Municipal Stadium, Paphos
Attendance: 53
Referee: Sven Jablonski (Germany)

==== Group 12 ====
Pos	Team	Pld	W	D	L	GF	GA	GD	Pts	Qualification
1	Germany	3	2	0	1	6	1	+5	**6**	Elite round
2	Latvia	3	2	0	1	4	4	0	**6**	Elite round
3	Slovakia	3	1	1	1	2	2	0	**4**	Elite round
4	Moldova (H)	3	0	1	2	3	8	−5	**1**	

Source: UEFA
Rules for classification: Tiebreakers
(H) Hosts
19 October 2022
12:00 (13:00 EEST)

Latvia	1–0	Slovakia
Jemeļjanovs 4'	Report

Zimbru-2 Stadium, Chișinău
Attendance: 40
Referee: Kári Á Høvdanum (Faroe Islands)
19 October 2022
12:00 (13:00 EEST)

Germany	4–0	Moldova
Brunner 2'; Moerstedt 29', 57'; Ramsak 73'	Report

CSR Orhei, Orhei
Attendance: 380
Referee: Nenad Minaković (Serbia)

22 October 2022
12:00 (13:00 EEST)

Slovakia	1–1	Moldova
Dikoš 4'	Report	Ciobanu 77'

CSR Orhei, Orhei
Attendance: 193
Referee: Viktor Shimusik (Belarus)
22 October 2022
12:00 (13:00 EEST)

Germany	2–0	Latvia
Brunner 58', 79'	Report

Zimbru-2 Stadium, Chișinău
Attendance: 75
Referee: Nenad Minaković (Serbia)

25 October 2022
12:00 (13:00 EEST)

Moldova	2–3	Latvia
Andreiciu 10'; David 45'	Report	Pakulis 29'; Bočs 48', 69'

CSR Orhei, Orhei
Attendance: 275
Referee: Viktor Shimusik (Belarus)
25 October 2022
12:00 (13:00 EEST)

Slovakia	1–0	Germany
Baláž 90+1'	Report

Zimbru-2 Stadium, Chișinău
Attendance: 50
Referee: Kári Á Høvdanum (Faroe Islands)

==== Group 13 ====
Pos	Team	Pld	W	D	L	GF	GA	GD	Pts	Qualification
1	Switzerland	3	2	1	0	12	3	+9	**7**	Elite round
2	Turkey	3	2	1	0	11	6	+5	**7**	Elite round
3	Bulgaria (H)	3	1	0	2	6	5	+1	**3**	
4	San Marino	3	0	0	3	1	16	−15	**0**	

Source: UEFA
Rules for classification: Tiebreakers
(H) Hosts
13 October 2022
11:00 EET

Turkey	5–1	San Marino
Karahisar 22'; Mete 45'; Canpolat 79', 90+1'; Ingenç 81'	Report	Yazici 43'

Stadion Hadzhi Dimitar, Sliven
Attendance: 150
Referee: Gustavo Correia (Portugal)
13 October 2022
16:00 EET

Bulgaria	0–2	Switzerland
	Report	Boteli 45+1' (pen.), 65'

Stadion Hadzhi Dimitar, Sliven
Attendance: 500
Referee: Daniyar Sakhi (Kazakhstan)

16 October 2022
11:00 EET

Switzerland	7–0	San Marino
Londja 36', 41', 65'; Xhemalija 43', 58'; Boteli 61' (pen.), 62'	Report

Stadion Hadzhi Dimitar, Sliven
Attendance: 70
Referee: David Smajc (Slovenia)
16 October 2022
16:00 EET

Turkey	3–2	Bulgaria
Canpolat 2'; Mete 31', 52'	Report	Sulev 41' (pen.); Onasci 55'

Stadion Hadzhi Dimitar, Sliven
Attendance: 600
Referee: Gustavo Correia (Portugal)

19 October 2022
16:00 EET

San Marino	0–4	Bulgaria
	Report	Shishkov 6'; Sulev 19'; Balov 46', 62'

Stadion Hadzhi Dimitar, Sliven
Attendance: 160
Referee: David Smajc (Slovenia)
19 October 2022
16:00 EET

Switzerland	3–3	Turkey
Xhemalija 45+1'; Boteli 64'; Grando 90+3'	Report	Gökay 51'; Akman 72'; Yıldız 90'

Stadion Beroe, Stara Zagora
Attendance: 35
Referee: Daniyar Sakhi (Kazakhstan)

=== Ranking of third-placed teams ===
To determine the four best third-placed teams from the qualifying round which advanced to the elite round, only the results of the third-placed teams against the first and second-placed teams in their group were taken into account.

Pos	Grp	Team	Pld	W	D	L	GF	GA	GD	Pts	Qualification
1	12	Slovakia	2	1	0	1	1	1	0	3	Elite Round
2	7	Albania	2	0	1	1	0	1	−1	1	Elite Round
3	4	Northern Ireland	2	0	1	1	1	4	−3	1	Elite Round
4	10	Belarus	2	0	1	1	2	6	−4	1	Elite Round
5	1	Kazakhstan	2	0	1	1	1	6	−5	1	
6	5	Austria	2	0	0	2	2	5	−3	0 (Note: Ranked by disciplinary points (Austria: 4 pts; Bulgaria: 6 pts).)	
7	13	Bulgaria	2	0	0	2	2	5	−3	0	
8	8	Greece	2	0	0	2	1	4	−3	0	
9	2	Azerbaijan	2	0	0	2	2	6	−4	0	
10	3	Georgia	2	0	0	2	3	9	−6	0	
11	9	Luxembourg	2	0	0	2	1	7	−6	0	
12	6	Romania	2	0	0	2	0	6	−6	0	
13	11	Gibraltar	2	0	0	2	0	14	−14	0	

Source: UEFA
Rules for classification: 1) points; 2) goal difference; 3) goals scored; 4) disciplinary points; 5) coefficient; 6) drawing of lots.

== Elite round ==
=== Draw ===
The draw for the elite round was held on 8 December 2022 at the UEFA headquarters in Nyon, Switzerland.

The teams were seeded according to their results in the qualifying round. The Netherlands and Spain, which received byes to the elite round, were automatically seeded into Pot A. Each group contained one team from Pot A, one team from Pot B, one team from Pot C, and one team from Pot D. Winners and runners-up from the same qualifying round group could not be drawn in the same group, but the best third-placed teams could be drawn in the same group as winners or runners-up from the same qualifying round group.

Pos	Grp	Team	Pld	W	D	L	GF	GA	GD	Pts	Seeding
1	—	Netherlands	0	0	0	0	0	0	0	0	Pot A
2	—	Spain	0	0	0	0	0	0	0	0	Pot A
3	11	Serbia	2	2	0	0	15	1	+14	6	Pot A
4	9	France	2	2	0	0	8	0	+8	6	Pot A
5	1	Portugal	2	2	0	0	8	1	+7	6	Pot A
6	8	Italy	2	2	0	0	6	0	+6	6	Pot A
7	6	Belgium	2	2	0	0	6	2	+4	6	Pot A
8	5	Montenegro	2	2	0	0	3	0	+3	6	Pot A
9	3	England	2	1	1	0	7	3	+4	4	Pot B
10	4	Czech Republic	2	1	1	0	6	2	+4	4	Pot B
11	10	Norway	2	1	1	0	5	1	+4	4	Pot B
12	2	Ukraine	2	1	1	0	6	3	+3	4	Pot B
13	13	Switzerland	2	1	1	0	5	3	+2	4	Pot B
14	7	Wales	2	1	1	0	2	0	+2	4	Pot B
15	12	Germany	2	1	0	1	2	1	+1	3	Pot B
16	3	Israel	2	1	1	0	4	2	+2	4	Pot B
17	13	Turkey	2	1	1	0	6	5	+1	4	Pot C
18	2	Bosnia and Herzegovina	2	1	1	0	2	1	+1	4	Pot C
19	6	Denmark	2	1	0	1	5	3	+2	3	Pot C
20	5	Poland	2	1	0	1	4	4	0	3	Pot C
21	11	Cyprus	2	1	0	1	3	3	0	3	Pot C
22	4	Scotland	2	1	0	1	4	5	−1	3	Pot C
23	7	Croatia	2	1	0	1	1	2	−1	3	Pot C
24	12	Latvia	2	1	0	1	1	2	−1	3	Pot C
25	9	Iceland	2	1	0	1	3	5	−2	3	Pot D
26	8	Finland	2	1	0	1	2	5	−3	3	Pot D
27	10	Republic of Ireland	2	0	2	0	3	3	0	2	Pot D
28	1	Slovenia	2	0	1	1	0	2	−2	1	Pot D
29	12	Slovakia	2	1	0	1	1	1	0	3	Pot D
30	7	Albania	2	0	1	1	0	1	−1	1	Pot D
31	4	Northern Ireland	2	0	1	1	1	4	−3	1	Pot D
32	10	Belarus	2	0	1	1	2	6	−4	1	Pot D

Source: UEFA
Rules for classification: 1) group position; 2) points; 3) goal difference; 4) goals scored; 5) disciplinary points; 6) coefficient ranking; 7) drawing of lots.

=== Groups ===
==== Group 1 ====
Pos	Team	Pld	W	D	L	GF	GA	GD	Pts	Qualification
1	Serbia (H)	3	2	0	1	9	2	+7	6	Final tournament
2	Bosnia and Herzegovina	3	1	1	1	3	7	−4	4 (Note: Ranked on head-to-head: Belarus 1–2 Bosnia and Herzegovina.)	
3	Belarus	3	1	1	1	5	5	0	4	
4	Israel	3	0	2	1	3	6	−3	2	

Source: UEFA
Rules for classification: Qualification tiebreakers
(H) Hosts
Notes:
22 March 2023
14:00

Bosnia and Herzegovina	1–1	Israel
Spahić 38'	Report	Farchi 66' (pen.)

Čukarički Stadium, Belgrade
Referee: Jérémy Muller (Luxembourg)
22 March 2023
14:00

Serbia	1–2	Belarus
Đurić 13'	Report	Apiatsionak 45+1'; Mialkouski 84'

Sports Center of FA of Serbia - pitch 1, Stara Pazova
Referee: Stefan Ebner (Austria)

25 March 2023
14:00

Serbia	5–0	Bosnia and Herzegovina
Stojanović 18'; Delibašić 38', 60'; Subotić 50'; Sremčević 85'	Report

Sports Center of FA of Serbia - pitch 1, Stara Pazova
Referee: Mikkel Redder (Denmark)
25 March 2023
14:00

Israel	2–2	Belarus
Asres 29'; Farchi 83'	Report	Melnichenko 8'; Lyukevich 13'

Čukarički Stadium, Belgrade
Referee: Jérémy Muller (Luxembourg)

28 March 2023
14:00

Israel	0–3	Serbia
	Report	Maksimović 20'; Cvetković 25'; Vukojević 45'

Sports Center of FA of Serbia - pitch 1, Stara Pazova
Referee: Stefan Ebner (Austria)
28 March 2023
14:00

Belarus	1–2	Bosnia and Herzegovina
Liukevich 41'	Report	Alajbegović 16'; Marčetić 72'

Sports Center of FA of Serbia - pitch 4, Stara Pazova
Referee: Mikkel Redder (Denmark)

==== Group 2 ====
Pos	Team	Pld	W	D	L	GF	GA	GD	Pts	Qualification
1	Wales (H)	3	1	2	0	7	5	+2	5	Final tournament
2	Scotland	3	1	1	1	4	5	−1	4	Final tournament
3	Iceland	3	0	3	0	1	1	0	3	
4	Montenegro	3	0	2	1	3	4	−1	2	

Source: UEFA
Rules for classification: Qualification tiebreakers
(H) Hosts
22 March 2023
14:00

Montenegro	0–0	Iceland
	Report

Cardiff International Sports Campus, Cardiff
Referee: Dominik Stary (Czech Republic)
22 March 2023
20:00

Scotland	2–4	Wales
Mcluckie 74', 77'	Report	I. Morgan 3', 51'; Biancheri 9'; Frame 89' (o.g.)

Rodney Parade, Newport
Referee: Pierre Gaillouste (France)

25 March 2023
14:00

Montenegro	1–2	Scotland
Perović 12'	Report	Cummings 42'; Mcluckie 82'

Cardiff International Sports Campus, Cardiff
Referee: Radoslav Gidzhenov (Bulgaria)
25 March 2023
17:00

Wales	1–1	Iceland
Tuck 31'	Report	Jóhannesson 52'

Dragon Park - National Football Development Centre, Newport
Referee: Dominik Stary (Czech Republic)

28 March 2023
14:00

Wales	2–2	Montenegro
I. Morgan 50'; Lawlor 86'	Report	Adžić 45+2', 45+3'

Dragon Park - National Football Development Centre, Newport
Referee: Radoslav Gidzhenov (Bulgaria)
28 March 2023
14:00

Iceland	0–0	Scotland
	Report

Cardiff International Sports Campus, Cardiff
Referee: Pierre Gaillouste (France)

==== Group 3 ====
Pos	Team	Pld	W	D	L	GF	GA	GD	Pts	Qualification
1	Netherlands (H)	3	2	1	0	5	3	+2	7	Final tournament
2	England	3	2	0	1	5	2	+3	6	Final tournament
3	Denmark	3	1	1	1	7	6	+1	4	
4	Northern Ireland	3	0	0	3	2	8	−6	0	

Source: UEFA
Rules for classification: Qualification tiebreakers
(H) Hosts
22 March 2023
19:00

Netherlands	2–1	Northern Ireland
Mastoras 67'; Land 90+2'	Report	Donnelly 33'

Gemeentelijk Sportpark S.J.C., Noordwijk
Referee: Roman Jitari (Moldova)
22 March 2023
19:00

Denmark	1–3	England
Chiakha 73'	Report	Nwaneri 9', 31'; Oboavwoduo 48'

Nieuw Zuid, Katwijk
Referee: Patrik Kolarić (Croatia)

25 March 2023
13:00

England	2–0	Northern Ireland
Nwaneri 63', 82'	Report

Gemeentelijk Sportpark S.J.C., Noordwijk
Referee: Patrik Kolarić (Croatia)
25 March 2023
16:00

Netherlands	2–2	Denmark
Mastoras 15'; Kuhn 32'	Report	Schwartau 76' (pen.); Chiakha 82'

Nieuw Zuid, Katwijk
Referee: Jovan Kachevski (North Macedonia)

28 March 2023
19:00

England	0–1	Netherlands
	Report	Wolff 32'

Nieuw Zuid, Katwijk
Referee: Roman Jitari (Moldova)
28 March 2023
19:00

Northern Ireland	1–4	Denmark
Morrison 66'	Report	Schwartau 38'; Slotsager 50'; Jensen 62'; Bidstrup 85'

Gemeentelijk Sportpark S.J.C., Noordwijk
Referee: Jovan Kachevski (North Macedonia)

==== Group 4 ====
Pos	Team	Pld	W	D	L	GF	GA	GD	Pts	Qualification
1	Spain	3	2	1	0	6	4	+2	7	Final tournament
2	Germany	3	2	0	1	12	5	+7	6	Final tournament
3	Turkey (H)	3	1	1	1	6	3	+3	4	
4	Finland	3	0	0	3	2	14	−12	0	

Source: UEFA
Rules for classification: Qualification tiebreakers
(H) Hosts
22 March 2023
10:00

Spain	2–1	Finland
Huestamendia 56'; Guiu 64'	Report	Ezeh 23'

Arslan Zeki Demirci Sports Complex, Manavgat
Referee: Jarred Gillett (Australia)
22 March 2023
13:30

Turkey	1–2	Germany
Ayhan 49'	Report	Hermann 29'; Darvich 56'

Arslan Zeki Demirci Sports Complex, Manavgat
Referee: Jóhan Hendrik Ellefsen (Faroe Islands)

25 March 2023
10:00

Germany	7–0	Finland
Hermann 4', 30'; Brunner 11', 87'; Osawe 18'; Kabar 55'; Wätjen 60'	Report

Arslan Zeki Demirci Sports Complex, Manavgat
Referee: Jóhan Hendrik Ellefsen (Faroe Islands)
25 March 2023
13:30

Spain	0–0	Turkey
	Report

Arslan Zeki Demirci Sports Complex, Manavgat
Referee: Lothar D'hondt (Belgium)

28 March 2023
13:00

Finland	1–5	Turkey
Ezeh 36'	Report	Ayhan 22'; Arkutcu 27'; Henry 35' (o.g.); Gürpüz 47', 89'

Arslan Zeki Demirci Sports Complex, Manavgat
Referee: Lothar D'hondt (Belgium)
28 March 2023
13:00

Germany	3–4	Spain
Brunner 29', 57'; Kabar 70'	Report	Guiu 23' (pen.), 36'; Mesa 76'; Da Silva Moreira 90+4' (o.g.)

Arslan Zeki Demirci Sports Complex, Manavgat
Referee: Jarred Gillett (Australia)

==== Group 5 ====
Pos	Team	Pld	W	D	L	GF	GA	GD	Pts	Qualification
1	Portugal (H)	3	3	0	0	5	0	+5	9	Final tournament
2	Poland	3	2	0	1	6	1	+5	6	Final tournament
3	Czech Republic	3	1	0	2	3	3	0	3	
4	Slovakia	3	0	0	3	0	10	−10	0	

Source: UEFA
Rules for classification: Qualification tiebreakers
(H) Hosts
22 March 2023
12:00

Poland	1–0	Czech Republic
Huras 84'	Report

Parque Desportivo Sant'Ana, Penalva Castelo
Referee: Antoine Paul Chiaramonti (Andorra)
22 March 2023
17:00

Portugal	2–0	Slovakia
Ferreira 6'; Duarte 89'	Report

Fontelo Municipal, Viseu
Referee: Mervan Bejtullahu (Kosovo)

25 March 2023
12:00

Czech Republic	3–0	Slovakia
Penxa 17'; Hranoš 50'; Kuťka 54' (o.g.)	Report

Municipal, Santa Comba Dão
Referee: Antoine Paul Chiaramonti (Andorra)
25 March 2023
16:00

Portugal	1–0	Poland
Patrício 74' (pen.)	Report

João Cardoso Stadium, Tondela
Referee: Menelaos Antoniou (Cyprus)

28 March 2023
16:00

Slovakia	0–5	Poland
	Report	Huras 42'; Tomczyk 45'; Rejczyk 45+2'; Mikołajewski 77'; Kolanko 90+3'

Parque Desportivo Sant'Ana, Penalva Castelo
Referee: Mervan Bejtullahu (Kosovo)
28 March 2023
16:00

Czech Republic	0–2	Portugal
	Report	Oliveira 37'; Fernandes 55'

Fontelo Municipal, Viseu
Referee: Menelaos Antoniou (Cyprus)

==== Group 6 ====
Pos	Team	Pld	W	D	L	GF	GA	GD	Pts	Qualification
1	Republic of Ireland	3	2	1	0	8	4	+4	7	Final tournament
2	Italy	3	2	1	0	7	3	+4	7	Final tournament
3	Ukraine	3	1	0	2	4	8	−4	3	
4	Cyprus (H)	3	0	0	3	5	9	−4	0	

Source: UEFA
Rules for classification: Qualification tiebreakers
(H) Hosts
7 March 2023
14:00

Italy	2–2	Republic of Ireland
Ravaglioli 66' (pen.); Mannini 80'	Report	Akachukwu 24'; Ramaj 38' (o.g.)

Municipal Geroskipou, Paphos
Referee: Jasper Vergoote (Belgium)
7 March 2023
17:00

Cyprus	2–4	Ukraine
Avramidis 45'; Tzouliou 90' (pen.)	Report	Khan 9'; Bilyi 22'; Kalyn 60'; Ponomarenko 82'

Stelios Kyriakides Stadium, Paphos
Referee: Antoni Bandić (Bosnia and Herzegovina)

10 March 2023
14:00

Italy	2–1	Cyprus
Sadotti 28'; Mannini 74'	Report	Socratous 79'

Stelios Kyriakides Stadium, Paphos
Referee: Antoni Bandić (Bosnia and Herzegovina)
10 March 2023
14:00

Ukraine	0–3	Republic of Ireland
	Report	Melia 4', 12', 62'

Municipal Geroskipou, Paphos
Referee: Mohammad Usman Aslam (Norway)

13 March 2023
14:00

Ukraine	0–3	Italy
	Report	Ravaglioli 40'; Liberali 77'; Mendicino 87'

Municipal Geroskipou, Paphos
Referee: Mohammad Usman Aslam (Norway)
13 March 2023
14:00

Republic of Ireland	3–2	Cyprus
Kehir 68'; Razi 82'; Okosun 90+6'	Report	Evangelou 39'; Avramidis 73'

Stelios Kyriakides Stadium, Paphos
Referee: Jasper Vergoote (Belgium)

==== Group 7 ====
Pos	Team	Pld	W	D	L	GF	GA	GD	Pts	Qualification
1	Croatia	3	2	1	0	3	1	+2	7	Final tournament
2	Slovenia	3	1	1	1	3	3	0	4 (Note: Ranked on head-to-head: Norway 0–1 Slovenia.)	Final tournament
3	Norway (H)	3	1	1	1	5	1	+4	4	
4	Belgium	3	0	1	2	1	7	−6	1	

Source: UEFA
Rules for classification: Qualification tiebreakers
(H) Hosts
Notes:
22 March 2023
13:00

Croatia	0–0	Norway
	Report

Sarpsborg Stadium, Sarpsborg
Referee: Marek Radina (Czech Republic)
22 March 2023
18:00

Belgium	1–1	Slovenia
Vergeylen 64'	Report	Jakupović 58'

Sarpsborg Stadium, Sarpsborg
Referee: Edgars Malcevs (Latvia)

25 March 2023
13:00

Belgium	0–1	Croatia
	Report	Kujundžić 90+4' (pen.)

Fredrikstad Stadion, Fredrikstad
Referee: Edgars Malcevs (Latvia)
25 March 2023
18:00

Norway	0–1	Slovenia
	Report	Obrić 89'

Fredrikstad Stadion, Fredrikstad
Referee: Kyriakos Athanasiou (Cyprus)

28 March 2023
17:00

Norway	5–0	Belgium
Temesgen Tewelde 5' (pen.); Sunde 26'; Thorvaldsen 34'; Walle Egeli 39', 82'	Report

Sarpsborg Stadium, Sarpsborg
Referee: Marek Radina (Czech Republic)
28 March 2023
17:00

Slovenia	1–2	Croatia
Sojer 84'	Report	Zebić 54'; Rimac 57'

Fredrikstad Stadion, Fredrikstad
Referee: Kyriakos Athanasiou (Cyprus)

==== Group 8 ====
Pos	Team	Pld	W	D	L	GF	GA	GD	Pts	Qualification
1	France	3	3	0	0	8	2	+6	9	Final tournament
2	Switzerland	3	1	1	1	7	5	+2	4	Final tournament
3	Albania (H)	3	0	2	1	2	6	−4	2	
4	Latvia	3	0	1	2	4	8	−4	1	

Source: UEFA
Rules for classification: Qualification tiebreakers
(H) Hosts
22 March 2023
11:30

France	4–0	Albania
Meupiyou 26'; Issoufou 29'; Bouneb 68' (pen.); Lambourde 85'	Report

Arena Kombëtare, Tirana
Attendance: 1500
Referee: David Dickinson (Scotland)
22 March 2023
15:30

Latvia	2–5	Switzerland
Azarovs 41'; Mickēvičs 55'	Report	Zé 2', 24'; Boteli 23'; Romano 51'; Minteh 88'

Elbasan Arena, Elbasan
Attendance: 100
Referee: Sivert Øksnes Amland (Norway)

25 March 2023
11:30

France	2–1	Latvia
Amougou 41', 70'	Report	Bočs 6'

Elbasan Arena, Elbasan
Attendance: 30
Referee: Oliver Reitala (Finland)
25 March 2023
17:00

Switzerland	1–1	Albania
Romano 66'	Report	Sulejmani 14'

Arena Kombëtare, Tirana
Attendance: 1500
Referee: Sivert Øksnes Amland (Norway)

28 March 2023
17:00

Albania	1–1	Latvia
Duro 56'	Report	Ivulāns 80'

Arena Kombëtare, Tirana
Attendance: 500
Referee: David Dickinson (Scotland)
28 March 2023
17:00

Switzerland	1–2	France
Minteh 65'	Report	Titi 8'; Bouchenna 17'

Elbasan Arena, Elbasan
Attendance: 40
Referee: Oliver Reitala (Finland)

=== Ranking of second-placed teams ===
The seven best second-placed teams from the elite round qualified for the final tournament.

Pos	Grp	Team	Pld	W	D	L	GF	GA	GD	Pts	Qualification
1	6	Italy	3	2	1	0	7	3	+4	7	Final tournament
2	4	Germany	3	2	0	1	12	5	+7	6	Final tournament
3	5	Poland	3	2	0	1	6	1	+5	6	Final tournament
4	3	England	3	2	0	1	5	2	+3	6	Final tournament
5	8	Switzerland	3	1	1	1	7	5	+2	4	Final tournament
6	7	Slovenia	3	1	1	1	3	3	0	4	Final tournament
7	2	Scotland	3	1	1	1	4	5	−1	4	Final tournament
8	1	Bosnia and Herzegovina	3	1	1	1	3	7	−4	4	

Source: UEFA
Rules for classification: 1) points; 2) goal difference; 3) goals scored; 4) disciplinary points; 5) coefficient; 6) drawing of lots.

== Qualified teams ==
The following 16 teams qualified for the final tournament.

Team	Qualified as	Qualified on	Previous appearances in Under-17 Euro^{1} only U-17 era (since 2002)
Hungary	Hosts	19 April 2021	5 (2002, 2003, 2006, 2017, 2019)
Serbia	Elite round Group 1 winners	28 March 2023	8 (2002^{2}, 2006^{3}, 2008, 2011, 2016, 2017, 2018, 2022)
Wales	Elite round Group 2 winners	28 March 2023	0 (debut)
Netherlands	Elite round Group 3 winners	28 March 2023	14 (2002, 2005, 2007, 2008, 2009, **2011**, **2012**, 2014, 2015, 2016, 2017, **2018**, **2019**, 2022)
Spain	Elite round Group 4 winners	28 March 2023	14 (2002, 2003, 2004, 2006, **2007**, **2008**, 2009, 2010, 2015, 2016, **2017**, 2018, 2019, 2022)
Portugal	Elite round Group 5 winners	28 March 2023	9 (2002, **2003**, 2004, 2010, 2014, **2016**, 2018, 2019, 2022)
Republic of Ireland	Elite round Group 6 winners	13 March 2023	5 (2008, 2015, 2017, 2018, 2019)
Croatia	Elite round Group 7 winners	28 March 2023	4 (2005, 2013, 2015, 2017)
France	Elite round Group 8 winners	28 March 2023	13 (2002, **2004**, 2007, 2008, 2009, 2010, 2011, 2012, **2015**, 2016, 2017, 2019, **2022**)
Italy	Elite round among best 7 runners-up	25 March 2023	10 (2003, 2005, 2009, 2013, 2015, 2016, 2017, 2018, 2019, 2022)
Germany	Elite round among best 7 runners-up	28 March 2023	13 (2002, 2006, 2007, **2009**, 2011, 2012, 2014, 2015, 2016, 2017, 2018, 2019, 2022)
Poland	Elite round among best 7 runners-up	28 March 2023	3 (2002, 2012, 2022)
England	Elite round among best 7 runners-up	28 March 2023	14 (2002, 2003, 2004, 2005, 2007, 2009, **2010**, 2011, **2014**, 2015, 2016, 2017, 2018, 2019)
Switzerland	Elite round among best 7 runners-up	28 March 2023	8 (**2002**, 2005, 2008, 2009, 2010, 2013, 2014, 2018)
Slovenia	Elite round among best 7 runners-up	28 March 2023	3 (2012, 2015, 2018)
Scotland	Elite round among best 7 runners-up	28 March 2023	6 (2008, 2014, 2015, 2016, 2017, 2022)

^{1} Bold indicates champions for that year. Italic indicates hosts for that year.
^{2} As FR Yugoslavia
^{3} As Serbia and Montenegro

== Goalscorers ==
In the qualifying round, there were 297 goals scored in 75 matches, for an average of 3.96 goals per match. In the elite round, there were 151 goals scored in 48 matches, for an average of 3.15 goals per match. In total, there were 448 goals scored in 123 matches, for an average of 3.64 goals per match.

8 goals

- (Ukraine) Matviy Ponomarenko

6 goals

- (Denmark) Amin Chiakha
- (Poland) Oskar Tomczyk
- (Switzerland) Winsley Boteli

5 goals

- (Norway) Sindre Walle Egeli

4 goals

- (Czech Republic) Vojtěch Hranoš
- (England) Ethan Nwaneri
- (France) Mathis Lambourde
- (Republic of Ireland) Mason Melia
- (Italy) Simone Pafundi
- (Norway) Faniel Temesgen Tewelde
- (Scotland) Rory Wilson
- (Serbia) Uroš Sremčević

3 goals

- (Belarus) Mark Mokin
- (Cyprus) Dimitrianos Tzouliou
- (Denmark) Sebastian Biller Mikkelsen
- (England) Jimmy-Jay Morgan
- (Germany) Paris Brunner
- (Greece) Stefanos Tzimas
- (Iceland) Daníel Tristan Gudjohnsen
- (Italy) Mattia Mannini
- (Kazakhstan) Tamerlan Agimanov
- (Luxembourg) Jason Federspiel
- (Portugal) Nuno Patrício
- (Scotland) Bobby McLuckie
- (Scotland) Jacob MacIntyre
- (Serbia) Lazar Jovanović
- (Switzerland) Ruben Londja
- (Switzerland) Demir Xhemalija
- (Turkey) Kebir Ali Canpolat
- (Turkey) Efe Can Mete

2 goals

- (Albania) Dean Vraniçi
- (Azerbaijan) Murad Mammadov
- (Azerbaijan) Niyazi Osmanov
- (Belgium) Matteo Filorizzo
- (Belgium) Cédric Nuozzi
- (Bosnia and Herzegovina) Stefan Marčetić
- (Bulgaria) Kristiyan Balov
- (Bulgaria) Ivan Sulev
- (Cyprus) Ioannis Avramidis
- (Czech Republic) Samuel Pikolon
- (Denmark) Tobias Lund Jensen
- (England) Tyler Dibling
- (England) Michael Golding
- (Estonia) Maksim Kalimullin
- (France) Ismail Bouneb
- (France) Eli Junior Kroupi
- (Georgia (country)) Teimuraz Odikadze
- (Germany) Max Moerstedt
- (Iceland) Þorri Stefán Þorbjörnsson
- (Italy) Tommaso Ravaglioli
- (Italy) Marco Romano
- (Latvia) Roberts Bočs
- (Poland) Daniel Mikołajewski
- (Portugal) Gonçalo Moreira
- (Portugal) Olívio Tomé
- (Republic of Ireland) Romeo Akachukwu
- (Republic of Ireland) Luke Kehir
- (Republic of Ireland) Nickson Okosun
- (Republic of Ireland) Najemedine Razi
- (Northern Ireland) Ryan Donnelly
- (Romania) Ianis Tarbă
- (Serbia) Mihajlo Cvetković
- (Serbia) Nikša Delibašić
- (Serbia) Andrija Maksimović
- (Sweden) Santino Samuyiwa
- (Switzerland) Arlet Junior Ze
- (Ukraine) Vladyslav Kalyn
- (Ukraine) Danylo Khan
- (Ukraine) Kyrylo Pashko
- (Wales) Joseph Hatch
- (Wales) Iwan Morgan

1 goal

- (Albania) Klaus Kashari
- (Andorra) Guillem Acosta
- (Andorra) Gerard García Suñé
- (Armenia) David Harutyunyan
- (Armenia) Artur Mikhaelyan
- (Austria) Fabian Feiner
- (Austria) Oliver Lukic
- (Austria) Philip Verhounig
- (Austria) Jovan Živković
- (Azerbaijan) Aşrəf Alakbarli
- (Azerbaijan) Hüseyn Hüseynov
- (Azerbaijan) İlkin Jafarli
- (Azerbaijan) Davud Mansumov
- (Azerbaijan) Elton Mikayılov
- (Azerbaijan) Ahmad Tarverdiyev
- (Belarus) Zakhar Baranok
- (Belarus) Ruslan Myalkovskiy
- (Belarus) Ales Sakhonchyk
- (Belarus) Tsimafei Simanenka
- (Belgium) Rayane Bounida
- (Belgium) Gilles de Meyer
- (Belgium) Raphael di Matteo
- (Belgium) Mathéo Gérard
- (Belgium) Rabby Mateta Pepa
- (Belgium) Robin Mirisola
- (Belgium) Axel Vergeylen
- (Bosnia and Herzegovina) Marko Brekalo
- (Bosnia and Herzegovina) Emir Dugić
- (Bulgaria) Kubrat Onasci
- (Bulgaria) Simeon Shishkov
- (Croatia) Leo Rimac
- (Croatia) Luka Vušković
- (Croatia) Filip Živković
- (Cyprus) Christos Evangelou
- (Cyprus) Andreas Nikolaou
- (Cyprus) George Socratous
- (Czech Republic) Adam Binar
- (Czech Republic) Lukáš Branecký
- (Czech Republic) Mikuláš Konečný
- (Czech Republic) Dominik Pech
- (Czech Republic) Daniel Rus
- (Denmark) Max Albæk Andersen
- (Denmark) Lucas Høgsberg
- (Denmark) Christian Jørgensen
- (England) Myles Lewis-Skelly
- (England) Justin Oboavwoduo
- (Estonia) Sigvard Suppi
- (Finland) Aspo Boström
- (Finland) David Ezeh
- (Finland) Otto Ruoppi
- (France) Mathis Amougou
- (France) Mohammed-Amine Boucehnna
- (France) Bastien Meupiyou
- (France) Daouda Traore
- (Georgia (country)) Aleksandre Amisulashvili
- (Georgia (country)) Saba Geguchadze
- (Georgia (country)) Avtandil Mashava
- (Georgia (country)) Aleksandre Turkia
- (Germany) Robert Ramsak
- (Greece) Christos Mouzakitis
- (Greece) Efstathios Panikidis
- (Greece) Grigorios Politakis
- (Iceland) Kjartan Már Kjartansson
- (Israel) Liran Hazan
- (Israel) Ido Oli
- (Israel) Yuval Ranon
- (Israel) Anas Sarsur
- (Israel) Karem Zoabi
- (Italy) Gabriele Finocchiaro
- (Italy) Mattia Liberali
- (Italy) Leonardo Mendicino
- (Italy) Federico Ragnoli Galli
- (Italy) Edoardo Sadotti
- (Italy) Filippo Scotti
- (Kazakhstan) Adilet Myngbay
- (Kosovo) Elvir Gashijan
- (Kosovo) Luan Lleshi
- (Kosovo) Fatjon Mulaj
- (Latvia) Timurs Azarovs
- (Latvia) Nikita Jemeljanovs
- (Latvia) Tomass Mickevics
- (Latvia) Ralfs Pakulis
- (Lithuania) Lukas Jonaitis
- (Lithuania) Mantas Malatokas
- (Luxembourg) Tiziano Mancini
- (Malta) Thomas Melillo
- (Moldova) Danil Andreiciu
- (Moldova) Ion Ciobanu
- (Moldova) Ovidiu David
- (Montenegro) Vasilije Adžiĉ
- (Montenegro) Andrej Camaj
- (Montenegro) Stefan Đukanović
- (Montenegro) Lazar Maraš
- (North Macedonia) Muhamed Elmas
- (North Macedonia) Stefan Mladenovski
- (Netherlands) Enoch Mastoras
- (Netherlands) Tygo Land
- (Northern Ireland) Calum Moreland
- (Northern Ireland) Adhamh Patton
- (Norway) Gustav Kjølstad Nyheim
- (Norway) Filip Thorvaldsen
- (Poland) Mike Huras
- (Poland) Jakub Krzyżanowski
- (Portugal) Diogo Lobão
- (Portugal) Gil Martins
- (Portugal) Gonçalo Oliveira
- (Portugal) João Simões
- (Portugal) Rodrigo Duarte
- (Portugal) Martim Ferreira
- (Republic of Ireland) Jake Grante
- (Republic of Ireland) Shaun Wade
- (Romania) Alin Cocoș
- (Romania) David Păcuraru
- (San Marino) Arda Kaan Yazici
- (Scotland) Rudi Allan-Molotnikov
- (Scotland) Alexander Hutton
- (Serbia) Andrej Petrović
- (Serbia) Veljko Vukojević
- (Slovakia) Adam Baláž
- (Slovakia) Samuel Dikoš
- (Slovakia) Aldin Jakupović
- (Slovenia) Nino Kutoš
- (Slovenia) Luka Topalović
- (Sweden) Isak Alemayehu Mulugeta
- (Sweden) Nuurdin Ali Mohudin
- (Sweden) Allen Smajic
- (Switzerland) Alessandro Gianni Romano
- (Switzerland) Modou Minteh
- (Switzerland) Leon Grando
- (Turkey) Efe Akman
- (Turkey) Emre Gökay
- (Turkey) Burak Ingenç
- (Turkey) Adnan Karahisar
- (Turkey) Veis Yıldız
- (Ukraine) Davyd Bilyi
- (Ukraine) Kyrylo Osypenko
- (Ukraine) Vladyslav Zakharchenko
- (Wales) Gabriele Biancheri
- (Wales) Luey Giles
- (Wales) Freddie Issaka
- (Wales) Troy Perret

1 own goal

- (Armenia) Gor Vanoyan (against Norway)
- (Finland) Emil Leveälahti (against Italy)
- (Italy) Gabriel Ramaj (against Republic of Ireland)
- (Scotland) Mitchel Frame (against Wales)
- (Wales) Dyaln Lawlor (against Sweden)

Source: UEFA.com
