= 2026–27 Belarusian Cup =

2025–26 football tournament in Belarus

Tournament details
- Country: Belarus
- Dates: 26 April 2026 – 2027
- Teams: 69

Tournament statistics
- Matches played: 70
- Goals scored: 240 (3.43 per match)
- Attendance: 26,807 (383 per match)
- Top goal scorer(s): (Belarus) Danila Grigoriev (Belarus) Aleksandr Shvedchikov (5 goals each)
- All statistics correct as of 26 July 2026.

The 2026–27 Belarusian Cup is the ongoing 36th season of Belarus's annual knock-out cup football competition. The first matches were held on 26 April 2026.

BATE Borisov are the defending champions.

== First round ==
The draw for the first and second rounds of the 2026–27 Belarus Cup occurred on 16 April 2026. Four clubs from the Belarusian Second League were drawn into the first round as the Grodno and Gomel regions had an odd number of teams. The remaining 34 clubs were drawn into the second round, and Krumkachy Minsk was drawn into the third round. Although originally scheduled to occur on 25 and 26 April, both games were held on 26 April.

Number of teams per tier still in competition
Premier League (1)	First League (2)	Second League (3)	Total
16 / 16	14 / 14	39 / 39	69 / 69

=== Gomel Region ===
26 April 2026	Rechytsa (III)	1–3	(III) Vertikal Kalinkovichi	Rechytsa
1:00 p.m. UTC+3	Chizhik 33'	Report	Shulyak 33', 47'; Kashkov 84'	Stadium: Central Stadium; Attendance: 50

=== Grodno Region ===
26 April 2026	Medvedi Smorgon (III)	3–1	(III) Ivye	Smarhon
3:00 p.m. UTC+3	Avgustinovich 35', 85'; Lezhnevich 83'	Report	Pavlovsky 89'	Stadium: Youth Sports School Stadium; Attendance: 70

== Second round ==
Matches for the second round was originally scheduled to be held from 1 to 6 May 2026, but the match between Energetik and BSU was held a week later on 13 May.

Number of teams per tier still in competition
Premier League (1)	First League (2)	Second League (3)	Total
16 / 16	14 / 14	37 / 39	67 / 69

=== Brest Region ===
1 May 2026	Novaya Pripyat Olshany (III)	2–4	(III) Stenles Pinsk	Stolin
1:00 p.m. UTC+3	Levočki 27'; Kulina 84'	Report	Kolyada 54' (pen.); Mayuk 56'; Kurgan 63'; Kolyada 90+3'	Stadium: Kommunalnik Stadium; Attendance: 88

1 May 2026	Agro-Pelishche Kamenetsky (III)	1–1 (a.e.t.) (2–3 p)	(III) Krechet Bereza	Kamyenyets
4:00 p.m. UTC+3		Report		Stadium: Kolos Stadium; Attendance: 40
	Penalties
	Shulkevich (penalty scored); Bolbat (penalty scored); Kovalyuk (penalty missed); Slozhenikin (penalty missed); Nekhin (penalty missed)		(penalty scored) Ivanov; (penalty scored) Vasichev; (penalty scored) Sushko; (penalty missed) Khutko

1 May 2026	Lyahavitski-Volat Lyakhovichi (III)	1–3	(III) Nadezhda Baranovichi	Lyakhavichy
4:00 p.m. UTC+3	Shcherbakov 18'	Report	Andrievsky 14', 82'; Gritskevich 85'	Stadium: Kolos Stadium; Attendance: 200

3 May 2026	Kommunalnik Byelaazyorsk (III)	1–6	(III) Ivatsevichi	Byelaazyorsk
4:00 p.m. UTC+3	Kholod 82'	Report	Voronovich 43'; Hristyuk 47', 51'; Sakadyn 64'; Lojko 77', 90'	Stadium: Sports School Stadium; Attendance: 135

=== Vitebsk Region ===
2 May 2026	Polotsk 2019 (III)	4–1	(III) Postavy	Polotsk
1:00 p.m. UTC+3	Olkhovsky 17', 23'; Aliyev 18'; Tamelo 43'	Report	Komissarchuk 59'	Stadium: Spartak Stadium; Attendance: 35

3 May 2026	Gazovik Vitebsk (III)	1–0	(III) Miory	Vitebsk
6:00 p.m. UTC+3	Morozov 28'	Report		Stadium: Vitebsk Sports Club; Attendance: 150

=== Gomel Region ===
1 May 2026	Leskhoz Gomel (III)	1–1 (a.e.t.) (8–7 p)	(III) MNPZ Mozyr	Gomel
12:30 p.m. UTC+3	Danilkov 104'	Report	Ermokovets 114'	Stadium: Lokomotiv Stadium; Attendance: 40
	Penalties
	Yanchenko (penalty scored); Dashuk (penalty missed); Trofimchuk (penalty scored); Vorobyov (penalty scored); Antanyuk (penalty scored); Shevchenko (penalty scored); Cherepov (penalty scored); Tereshchenko (penalty scored); Danilkov (penalty missed); Kuksov (penalty scored)		(penalty missed) Veko; (penalty scored) Pivovarov; (penalty scored) Kabushkov; (penalty scored) Kolybenko; (penalty scored) Nikitochkin; (penalty scored) Makarevich; (penalty scored) Tsiblienko; (penalty scored) Ermokovets; (penalty missed) Bondar; (penalty missed) Savitsky

2 May 2026	Khoiniki (III)	1–2	(III) Rechitsa/Vertikal	Khoiniki
4:00 p.m. UTC+3	Pytkov 75'	Report	Kashkov 30'; Lazarev 44'	Stadium: City Stadium; Attendance: 300

=== Grodno Region ===
1 May 2026	Neman Mosty (III)	4–0	(III) Medvedi/Ivye	Masty
2:00 p.m. UTC+3	Kopytich 4'; Onishchik 31'; Gubochkin 39', 83'	Report		Stadium: Neman Stadium; Attendance: 600

3 May 2026	Shchuchyn (III)	3–1	(III) Neman-Belkard Grodno	Shchuchyn
4:00 p.m. UTC+3	Motuta 36'; Beya 40'; Tarasyuk 89'	Report	Zhurnevich 49'	Stadium: Olimp Stadium; Attendance: 205

=== Minsk Oblast ===
1 May 2026	Sputnik Smolevichi (III)	0–1	(III) Bobovnya Kopylsky	Oktyabrsky
1:00 p.m. UTC+3		Report	Danylevich 51'	Stadium: Oktyabrsky Sports and Recreation Center; Attendance: 82

3 May 2026	Viliya Vileika (III)	1–2	(III) Viktoriya Maryina Gorka	Vileyka
2:00 p.m. UTC+3	Selitsky 44'	Report	Vysevka 8'; Kiyko 19'	Stadium: City Stadium; Attendance: 86

=== Mogilev Oblast ===
2 May 2026	Horki (III)	0–5 (a.e.t.)	(III) Drut Belynichi	Horki
4:00 p.m. UTC+3		Report	Vorobyov 92'; Demidchik 95'; Kleshchenok 106'; Kostrov 113'; Demidchik 117'	Stadium: City Stadium; Attendance: 120

3 May 2026	Tekhnolog-BSUT Mogilev (III)	14–0	(III) Cherikov	Mogilev
4:00 p.m. UTC+3	Chulitsky 11' (pen.), 41'; Grigoriev 26', 29', 32', 69', 88'; Vladimirov 31', 67' (pen.); Shust 34', 75'; Korovatsky 61', 78', 85'	Report		Stadium: Dnepr-Mogilev Stadium; Attendance: 70

=== Minsk ===
6 May 2026	Urozhaynaya (III)	2–0	(III) Turkspor	Balshavik
7:00 p.m. UTC+3	Vodohokhov 15'; Klimashevsky 66'	Report		Stadium: Sports and Recreation Center; Attendance: 78

6 May 2026	Minskoye More (III)	5–1	(III) Spartak	Minsk
10:00 p.m. UTC+3	Ostankovich 42'; Grusha 77', 84', 85'; Shpilevsky 90+1'	Report	Pavel 32'	Stadium: Grugany Stadium; Attendance: 65

13 May 2026	Energetik (III)	1–1 (a.e.t.) (5–6 p)	(III) BSU	Minsk
p.m. UTC+3	Kozlov 74'	Report	Shilo 75'	Stadium: RCOP-Staiki Stadium; Attendance: 75
	Penalties
	Suprunyuk (penalty missed); Zavadich (penalty scored); Zhdan (penalty scored); Sharipov (penalty scored); Borodavko (penalty scored); Kozlov (penalty scored); Svirid (penalty missed)		(penalty scored) Vasilyevsky; (penalty missed) Baldzhanov; (penalty scored) Filonetz; (penalty scored) Shiloh; (penalty scored) Pavlov; (penalty scored) Kodeba; (penalty scored) Mikholap

== Third round ==
The draw for the third round of the 2026–27 Belarusian Cup was held on 15 May 2026. The draw included 1 of the Second League winners from Round 1, the 17 Second League winners from Round 2, and 14 clubs from the First League. Matches were scheduled to occur from 20 to 28 May 2026.

Number of teams per tier still in competition
Premier League (1)	First League (2)	Second League (3)	Total
16 / 16	14 / 14	20 / 39	50 / 69

20 May 2026	Drut Belynichi (III)	0–7	(II) Orsha	Byalynichy
5:30 p.m. UTC+3		Report	Volchenko 38'; Shalychev 42'; Vekhtev 53'; Pashkevich 56', 78', 90+2' (pen.); Zheleznikov 74'	Stadium: City Stadium; Attendance: 400

20 May 2026	Ivatsevichi (III)	1–3	(II) Slutsky	Ivatsevichy
6:00 p.m. UTC+3	Khrystyuk 1'	Report	Chebotar 36', 60'; Tseluyko 80'	Stadium: Klenovka Arena; Attendance: 200

20 May 2026	Minskoye More (III)	0–3	(II) SKA-1938 Minsk	Minsk
7:00 p.m. UTC+3		Report	Mazko 6'; Korytko 8'; Knyshev 43'	Stadium: RCOP-Staiki Stadium; Attendance: 95

27 May 2026	Vertikal Kalinkovichi (III)	0–7	(II) Smorgon	Kalinkavichy
5:00 p.m. UTC+3		Report	Devyaten 17'; Kovalevich 51', 90+1'; Fazylov 62'; Tishko 89'; Starovoytov 90+2'; Mounga 90+3'	Stadium: SDYUSHOR-2 Stadium; Attendance: 700

27 May 2026	Leskhoz Gomel (III)	0–3	(II) Shakhtyor Soligorsk	Gomel
5:30 p.m. UTC+3		Report	Kozlov 10'; Chakur 52'; Kurbachev 71'	Stadium: SDYUSHOR-7 Stadium; Attendance: 100

27 May 2026	Gazovik Vitebsk (III)	1–4	(II) Volna Pinsk	Vitebsk
6:00 p.m. UTC+3	Bankov 87'	Report	Vlasov 7'; Nizhnik 45+1'; Grechikha 51'; Nikoporenok 53'	Stadium: Vitebsk Central Sports Complex; Attendance: 50

27 May 2026	Shchuchyn (III)	3–4	(II) Lida	Shchuchyn
6:00 p.m. UTC+3	Beya 38', 54'; Pylypchyk 59'	Report	Gribovsky 22' (pen.); Puzach 25'; Chernyak 55'; Ivanovsky 68'	Stadium: Olimp Stadium; Attendance: 360

27 May 2026	Polotsk-2019 (III)	0–2	(II) Uni X Labs	Polotsk
6:00 p.m. UTC+3		Report	Narchuk 8'; Turovets 31'	Stadium: Spartak Stadium; Attendance: 60

17 May 2026	Bobovnya Kopylsky (III)	0–2	(II) Bumprom Gomel	Kapyl
6:00 p.m. UTC+3		Report	Kabyshev 61'; Fastovets 85'	Stadium: City Stadium; Attendance: 70

27 May 2026	Krechet Bereza (III)	0–8	(II) Ostrovets	Byaroza
6:00 p.m. UTC+3		Report	Prudnik 28'; Gonzhurov 45'; Goncharik 50'; Kudinov 53'; Yakimovich 74', 80', 87'; Priko 76' (o.g.)	Stadium: Youth Sports School Stadium; Attendance: 125

27 May 2026	Neman Mosty (III)	1–4	(II) Niva Dolbizno	Masty
7:00 p.m. UTC+3	Gubochkin 42'	Report	Dybin 52'; Galuza 61'; Pampukha 80' (pen.); Tkhagalegov 88'	Stadium: Neman Stadium; Attendance: 1,000

27 May 2026	BSU (III)	0–2	(II) Osipovichi	Minsk
7:00 p.m. UTC+3		Report	Lapin 76'; Kulikov 90+2'	Stadium: ABFF Training Field No. 2 Attendance: 70

27 May 2026	Urozhaynaya (III)	0–3	(II) Molodechno	Minsk
8:00 p.m. UTC+3		Report	Sakhonchik 24', 25'; Shmarov 90+1'	Stadium: FC Minsk Stadium; Attendance: 105

28 May 2026	Tekhnolog-BSUT Mogilev (III)	0–6	(II) Slonim-2017	Mogilev
6:00 p.m. UTC+3		Report	Mushulov 23'; Konev 24'; Papava 28'; Kalinchenko 58'; Chuyko 72', 86'	Stadium: Dnepr-Mogilev Stadium; Attendance: 35

28 May 2026	Stenles Pinsk (III)	1–4	(III) Krumkachy Minsk	Pinsk
6:00 p.m. UTC+3	Kolyada 74' (pen.)	Report	Seriy 18'; Ladutko 66'; Baranov 70'; Tsvetkov 79'	Stadium: Football Academy Stadium; Attendance: 181

28 May 2026	Viktoriya Maryina Gorka (III)	1–0	(III) Nadezhda Baranovichi	Maryina Horka
6:00 p.m. UTC+3	Apanasovich 7'	Report		Stadium: City Stadium; Attendance: 75

== Round of 32 ==
The draw for the round of 32 of the 2026–27 Belarusian Cup was held on 29 May 2026. The round consists of 16 teams from the Premier League, 14 teams from the First League, and 2 teams from the Second League. Most matches were scheduled to occur in mid-July, but three matches were held in mid-June as three of the clubs involved—BATE Borisov, Dinamo Minsk, and ML Vitebsk—as those clubs were scheduled to participate in the 2026–27 UEFA Conference League in July.

Number of teams per tier still in competition
Premier League (1)	First League (2)	Second League (3)	Total
16 / 16	14 / 14	2 / 39	32 / 69

17 June 2026	Molodechno (II)	1–4	(I) BATE Borisov	Maladzyechna
4:00 p.m. UTC+3	Gruzhevsky 51'	Report	Rusakov 8', 18'; Yatskevich 45'; Rakhmanaw 72'	Stadium: City Stadium; Attendance: 1,100

17 June 2026	SKA-1938 Minsk (II)	3–5 (a.e.t.)	(I) ML Vitebsk	Minsk
6:00 p.m. UTC+3	Prigodich 54'; Korytko 57'; Kartoev 109'	Report	Kontsevoy 74'; Lisakovich 81' (pen.), 94'; Ivanov 94'; Glushkov 100', 117'	Stadium: RCOP-Staiki Stadium; Attendance: 450

17 June 2026	Slutsky (II)	0–2	(I) Dinamo Minsk	Slutsk
6:30 p.m. UTC+3		Report	Malashevich 74'; Lutskovich 90+2'	Stadium: City Stadium; Attendance: 1,100

18 July 2026	Osipovichi (II)	1–3	(I) Dnepr Mogilev	Asipovichy
4:00 p.m. UTC+3	Kovardaev 79'	Report	Alekseyev 48' (o.g.); Tereshchuk 52', 55'	Stadium: Yunost Stadium; Attendance: 1,300

18 July 2026	Slonim-2017 (II)	0–1	(I) Isloch Minsk Raion	Slonim
4:30 p.m. UTC+3		Report	Olaleye 31'	Stadium: Yunost Stadium; Attendance: 2,220

18 July 2026	Niva Dolbizno (II)	2–3 (a.e.t.)	(I) Gomel	Dolbizno
5:00 p.m. UTC+3	Pampukha 25', 31' (pen.)	Report	Barsukow 8'; Shubovich 73' (o.g.); Milyutin 92' (o.g.)	Stadium: Agro-Niva Stadium; Attendance: 420

18 July 2026	Smorgon (II)	3–4	(I) Minsk	Smarhon
5:30 p.m. UTC+3	Dukso 18'; Yablonsky 61'; Mounga 89'	Report	Dieye 40'; Sokol 45'; Makas 68'; Migdalyonok 90+3'	Stadium: Yunost Stadium; Attendance: 380

18 July 2026	Lida (II)	0–4	(I) Torpedo-BelAZ Zhodino	Lida
6:00 p.m. UTC+3		Report	Poluyanov 6' (o.g.); Agbo 43'; Martyanov 89'; Zhulpa 90+2'	Stadium: Start Stadium; Attendance: 650

18 July 2026	Ostrovets (II)	2–3 (a.e.t.)	(I) Vitebsk	Astravyets
6:00 p.m. UTC+3	Goncharik 87' (pen.); Gonzhurov 90'	Report	Žgomba 46'; Teverov 85' (pen.); Pesnyak 111'	Stadium: ASK Stadium; Attendance: 250

18 July 2026	Bumprom Gomel (II)	0–0 (a.e.t.) (5–6 p)	(I) Arsenal Dzerzhinsk	Gomel
6:30 p.m. UTC+3		Report		Stadium: SDYuShOR-6 Stadium; Attendance: 220
	Penalties
	Grudko (penalty scored); Makushinsky (penalty missed); Sidarenka (penalty scored); Ovsyanik (penalty scored); Miroevsky (penalty scored); Kutkovich (penalty scored); Parmonov (penalty missed)		(penalty scored) Lovets; (penalty scored) Vasilyev; (penalty scored) Sazonchik; (penalty missed) Volskiy; (penalty scored) Polyakov; (penalty scored) Oreshkevich; (penalty scored) Kotlyarov

18 July 2026	Uni X Labs (II)	1–4	(I) Baranovichi	Minsk
7:30 p.m. UTC+3	Khalimonchikov 45'	Report	Fedotov 15'; Bondarenko 46'; Gitselev 62'; Lebedev 90+4'	Stadium: Grugany Stadium; Attendance: 521

19 July 2026	Shakhtyor Soligorsk (II)	1–2 (a.e.t.)	(I) Neman Grodno	Salihorsk
3:00 p.m. UTC+3	Kutspelov 75'	Report	Vasilyev 50'; Pavlyukovets 107'	Stadium: Stroitel Stadium

19 July 2026	Volna Pinsk (II)	0–5	(I) Slavia Mozyr	Minsk
4:00 p.m. UTC+3		Report	Solovey 15', 44', 66'; Lukashov 19' (pen.); Lutsevich 38'	Stadium: Football Academy Stadium

19 July 2026	Orsha (II)	2–2 (a.e.t.) (4–3 p)	(I) Naftan Novopolotsk	Orsha
4:30 p.m. UTC+3	Pashkevich 84'; Yakovlev 89' (o.g.)	Report	Yakovlev 10'; Levedzew 18'	Stadium: City Stadium
	Penalties
	Tarbyakov (penalty scored); Stain (penalty scored); Pashkevich (penalty scored); Tikhomirov (penalty scored)		Yakovlev (penalty missed); Latykhov (penalty scored); Drabatovich (penalty scored); Adamovich (penalty scored); Abrorov (penalty missed)

19 July 2026	Viktoriya Maryina Gorka (III)	1–8	(I) Belshina Bobruisk	Maryina Horka
5:00 p.m. UTC+3	Demidovich 45'	Report	Solanovich 7' (pen.); Achapovskiy 10', 32', 43'; Shvedchikov 12', 31', 51', 72'	Stadium: City Stadium

19 July 2026	Krumkachy Minsk (III)	0–5	(I) Dynamo Brest	Salihorsk
6:00 p.m. UTC+3		Report	Gordeychik 1' (o.g.); Lozhkin 22'; Kovalevich 37'; Gritskevich 85', 89'	Stadium: Shakhtar Stadium

== Round of 16 ==
The draw for the round of 16 occurred on 20 July 2026.

Number of teams per tier still in competition
Premier League (1)	First League (2)	Second League (3)	Total
15 / 16	1 / 14	0 / 39	16 / 69

25 July 2026	Belshina Bobruisk (I)	1–2	(I) Minsk	Babruysk
2:00 p.m. UTC+3	Shvedchikov 62'	Report	Migdalyonok 6'; Malyutin 90+1'	Stadium: Spartak Stadium; Attendance: 840

25 July 2026	Isloch Minsk Raion (I)	1–1 (a.e.t.) (7–8 p)	(I) Baranovichi	Minsk
4:00 p.m. UTC+3	Kovalevich 11'	Report	Lebedev 72'	Stadium: Olympic Sports and Recreation Center; Attendance: 650
	Penalties
	Butko (penalty scored); Makarenko (penalty scored); Shevchenko (penalty scored); Shkurdyuk (penalty scored); Skrobotov (penalty missed); Khovalko (penalty missed); Zhuravlev (penalty scored); Yudchits (penalty scored); Tikhomirov (penalty scored); Klimovich (penalty missed)		(penalty scored) Ryabykh; (penalty scored) Balbukh; (penalty missed) Shevchenko; (penalty scored) Gitselev; (penalty scored) Penchuk; (penalty missed) Pukhov; (penalty scored) Muzychenko; (penalty scored) Petrenko; (penalty scored) Bruy; (penalty scored) Tkachev

25 July 2026	Gomel (I)	1–2 (a.e.t.)	(I) Vitebsk	Gomel
6:00 p.m. UTC+3	Martinkevich 52'	Report	Chervyakov 44'; Anufriyev 114'	Stadium: Central Stadium; Attendance: 5,270

25 July 2026	Torpedo-BelAZ Zhodino (I)	1–2	(I) Dnepr Mogilev	Zhodzina
8:00 p.m. UTC+3	Pobudey 51'	Report	Tsepenkov 18'; Karpitsky 56'	Stadium: Torpedo Stadium; Attendance: 1,371

26 July 2026	Arsenal Dzerzhinsk (I)	2–3 (a.e.t.)	(I) Neman Grodno	Barysaw
6:00 p.m. UTC+3	Vasin 42'; Vasilyev 77'	Report	Savitsky 39', 90+2'; Kravtsov 100'	Stadium: Haradski Stadium; Attendance: 300

26 July 2026	Slavia Mozyr (I)	2–1	(I) Dynamo Brest	Mazyr
8:00 p.m. UTC+3	Lutsevich 27'; Solovey 38'	Report	Butarevich 66'	Stadium: Yunost Stadium; Attendance: 3,650

11 November 2026	Orsha (II)	v	(I) BATE Borisov	Orsha
2:30 p.m. UTC+3		Report		Stadium: City Stadium

4 December 2026	Dinamo Minsk (I)	v	(I) ML Vitebsk	Minsk
--:-- UTC+3		Report		Stadium: National Stadium

== Quarterfinals ==
The following teams qualified for the quarterfinals:

- Baranovichi (I)
- Dnepr Mogilev (I)
- Minsk (I)
- Neman Grodno (I)
- Slavia Mozyr (I)
- Vitebsk (I)

Number of teams per tier still in competition
Premier League (1)	First League (2)	Second League (3)	Total
9 / 16	1 / 14	0 / 39	10 / 69

== Top goalscorers ==
Rank	Player	Team	Goals
1	(Belarus) Danila Grigoriev	Tekhnolog-BSUT Mogilev (III)	5
1	(Belarus) Aleksandr Shvedchikov	Belshina Bobruisk (I)	5
2	(Belarus) Maksim Pashkevich	Orsha (II)	4
2	(Belarus) Andrey Solovey	Slavia Mozyr (I)	4
3	(Belarus) Arseniy Achapovskiy	Belshina Bobruisk (I)	3
3	(Democratic Republic of the Congo) Isaac Beya	Shchuchyn (III)	3
3	(Belarus) Ivan Grusha	Minskoye More (III)	3
3	(Belarus) Daniil Gubochkin	Neman Mosty (III)	3
3	(Belarus) Nikita Korovatsky	Tekhnolog-BSUT Mogilev (III)	3
3	(Belarus) Nikita Yakimovich	Ostrovets (II)	3
