= Aleksandr Shvedchikov =

Belarusian footballer (born 2003)

Personal information
- Full name: Aleksandr Shvedchikov
- Date of birth: 20 July 2003 (age 23)
- Place of birth: Minsk, Belarus
- Height: 1.94 m (6 ft 4 in)
- Position: Forward

Team information
- Current team: Belshina Bobruisk
- Number: 9

Youth career
- –2021: Minsk
- 2021–2023: BATE Borisov

Senior career*
Years	Team	Apps	(Gls)
2023–2025	BATE Borisov	20	(0)
2023	→ Molodechno (loan)	30	(7)
2024–2025	BATE-2 Borisov	16	(7)
2025	→ Arsenal Dzerzhinsk (loan)	4	(0)
2026–	Belshina Bobruisk	9	(1)

International career^{‡}
2024	Belarus U21	2	(0)
- * Club domestic league appearances and goals as of 3 July 2026 ‡ National team caps and goals as of 15 October 2024

Aleksandr Shvedchikov (Belarusian: Аляксандар Шведчыкаў; Russian: Александр Шведчиков; born 20 July 2003) is a Belarusian professional footballer who plays as a forward for Belarusian Premier League club Belshina Bobruisk.

== Club career ==
=== FC Molodechno ===
In January 2023, Shvedchikov joined the FC Molodechno club on loan until the end of the season. On 2 April 2023, Shvedchikov made his debut for the club against Lokomotiv Gomel, Shvedchikov was featured in the starting lineup and scored. At the end of the season, Shvedchikov returned to BATE Borisov.

=== BATE Borisov ===
In January 2024, Shvedchikov came back from his loan. On 6 March 2024, Shvedchikov made his debut in a quarterfinal match of the Belarusian Cup against Dinamo Minsk, coming on as a substitute at the beginning of the second half where they go to lose 1–0. In March 2024, Shvedchikov signed a new two-year contract with the club.

== International career ==
In March 2024, Shvedchikov was called up to the Belarus national under-21 football team to participate in qualifying matches for the 2025 UEFA European Under-21 Championship. On 22 March 2024, Shvedchikov made his debut in a match against the Greek national team.
