= Vladislav Vasilyev =

Vladislav Vasilyev may refer to:

- Vladislav Vasilyev (footballer, born 1997), Kazakhstani football midfielder
- Vladislav Vasilyev (footballer, born 1999), Russian football midfielder
- Vladislav Vasilyev (footballer, born 2004), Russian football defender
