= Ivan Berezun =

Belarusian professional footballer

Personal information
- Date of birth: 19 August 1997 (age 29)
- Place of birth: Vitebsk, Belarus
- Position: Midfielder

Team information
- Current team: Orsha
- Number: 8

Youth career
- 2013–2014: Komsomolets Vitebsk
- 2015–2018: Vitebsk

Senior career*
| Years | Team | Apps | (Gls) |
| 2016–2021 | Vitebsk | 1 | (0) |
| 2018–2020 | → Orsha (loan) | 54 | (1) |
| 2022–2023 | Orsha | 48 | (1) |
| 2025– | Orsha | 27 | (0) |
- * Club domestic league appearances and goals as of 6 July 2026

Ivan Berezun (Belarusian: Іван Беразун; Russian: Иван Березун; born 19 August 1997) is a Belarusian professional footballer who plays for Orsha.
