= FC Orsha =

- Full name: Football Club Orsha
- Founded: 1951; 75 years ago
- Ground: City Stadium
- Capacity: 2,852
- Head Coach: Dmitry Suzdaltsev
- League: Belarusian First League
- 2025: Belarusian First League, 16th of 18
Home colours	Away colours

FC Orsha is a football club based in Orsha, Vitebsk Oblast.

== History ==
The team was founded in 1951 as Trud Orsha. The club was renamed to ZShM in 1956 and then to Mashinostroitel Orsha in 1960.

In 1965 the club was renamed to Start Orsha. The 60s and the 70s were the most successful years for the club, as they won the Vitebsk Oblast league in 1968, 1970, 1972 and 1977 as well as the Vitebsk Oblast cup in 1961, 1971, 1972 and 1976. In 1971, they reached the final of the Belarusian SSR Cup. They played in the Belarusian SSR top league from 1971 until 1985.

In 1992, the team was renamed to Legmash Orsha and joined the newly created Belarusian Second League. In 1994, the team was renamed to Maxim-Legmash Orsha due to sponsorship. After a successful 1995 season, Maxim-Legmash was promoted to the First League. Before the start of the 1996 season, the 'Legmash' part of the name was dropped due to Legmash plant withdrawal from team support and the team spent one season as Maxim-Orsha before being renamed again into FC Orsha in 1997. At the end of 2001, Orsha withdrew to the amateur level (Vitebsk Oblast championship) due to financial troubles.

The team returned in 2004, once again joining the Second League. The first post-return season was quite successful and Orsha was promoted to the First League for the 2005 season, but they quickly relegated back and since 2006 onwards, they've been playing in the Second League. In 2006, the team was known as Orsha-BelAutoService. Since 2014, they play in the First League.

=== Name changes ===
- 1951: founded as FC Trud Orsha
- 1956: renamed to FC ZShM Orsha
- 1960: renamed to FC Mashinostroitel Orsha
- 1965: renamed to FC Start Orsha
- 1992: renamed to FC Legmash Orsha
- 1995: renamed to FC Maxim-Orsha Orsha
- 1996: renamed to FC Maxim-Legmash Orsha
- 1997: renamed to FC Orsha
- 2006: renamed to FC Orsha-BelAutoService Orsha
- 2007: renamed to FC Orsha

== Honours ==
- Belarusian SSR Cup
  - Runner-up (1): 1971

== Current squad ==
As of 19 October 2026

Note: Flags indicate national team as defined under FIFA eligibility rules; some limited exceptions apply. Players may hold more than one non-FIFA nationality.

No.	Pos.	Nation	Player
1	GK	BLR	Artyom Volodkov
3	DF	BLR	Nikita Bykov (on loan from Maxline Vitebsk)
5	DF	BLR	Nikita Tarbyakov
7	FW	BLR	Nikita Bobchenok
8	MF	BLR	Ivan Berezun
9	FW	BLR	Dmitriy Tikhomirov
10	MF	BLR	Alyaksandr Aleksandrovich
11	FW	BLR	Danila Stain
13	MF	RUS	Danila Strebtsov
14	DF	BLR	Artyom Dambrovsky
16	MF	BLR	Maksim Pashkevich
17	MF	BLR	Yaroslav Kulesh (on loan from BATE Borisov)

No.	Pos.	Nation	Player
18	DF	BLR	Nikita Volchenko
19	MF	BLR	Veniamin Kostyukovich
22	MF	RUS	Yegor Kudinov
52	GK	BLR	Roman Kravchenko
69	MF	BLR	Stanislaw Bulakhaw
77	MF	BLR	Gleb Zheleznikov
80	DF	BLR	Yan Komarov
82	DF	RUS	Vitaliy Shalychev
88	MF	BLR	Denis Rudenok
93	MF	BLR	Pavel Bordukov
98	MF	BLR	Andrey Romanov
—	MF	BLR	Vladislav Mitrofanov
