= Mark Mokin =

Belarusian footballer (born 2006)

Personal information
- Full name: Mark Maksimovich Mokin
- Date of birth: 26 January 2006 (age 20)
- Height: 1.78 m (5 ft 10 in)
- Position: Forward

Team information
- Current team: Arsenal Dzerzhinsk (on loan from Baltika Kaliningrad)
- Number: 7

Youth career
- 2017–2022: Dnepr Mogilev

Senior career*
Years	Team	Apps	(Gls)
2022–2023	Dnepr Mogilev	38	(3)
2024–	Baltika-2 Kaliningrad	38	(6)
2024–	Baltika Kaliningrad	0	(0)
2025–	→ Arsenal Dzerzhinsk (loan)	22	(6)

International career^{‡}
2021–2023	Belarus U17	8	(3)
2024–	Belarus U19	3	(0)
- * Club domestic league appearances and goals as of 3 July 2026 ‡ National team caps and goals as of 19 November 2024

Mark Maksimovich Mokin (Russian: Марк Максимович Мокин; born 26 January 2006) is a Belarusian footballer who plays as a forward for Arsenal Dzerzhinsk on loan from Russian club Baltika Kaliningrad.

== Club career ==
Mokin became the third youngest goal-scorer in the history of the Belarusian Premier League when he netted for Dnepr Mogilev against Dinamo Minsk in July 2022.

== International career ==
Mokin has represented Belarus at under-17 level.

== Career statistics ==
=== Club ===
As of 25 May 2025

Club	Season	League			Cup		Continental		Other		Total	
Club	Season	Division	Apps	Goals	Apps	Goals	Apps	Goals	Apps	Goals	Apps	Goals
Dnepr Mogilev	2022	Belarusian Premier League	17	1	1 (Note: Appearances in the Belarusian Cup)	0	0	0	0	0	18	1
Dnepr Mogilev	2023	Belarusian First League	21	2	2	2	0	0	0	0	23	4
Dnepr Mogilev	Total		38	3	3	2	0	0	0	0	41	5
Baltika-2 Kaliningrad	2024	Russian Second League B	25	4	0	0	0	0	0	0	25	4
Baltika-2 Kaliningrad	2025	Russian Second League B	8	0	0	0	0	0	0	0	8	0
Baltika-2 Kaliningrad	Total		33	4	0	0	0	0	0	0	33	4
Baltika Kaliningrad	2024–25	Russian First League	0	0	0	0	–		–		0	0
Career total			71	7	3	2	0	0	0	0	74	9
