= Dzambolat Tsallagov =

Russian footballer

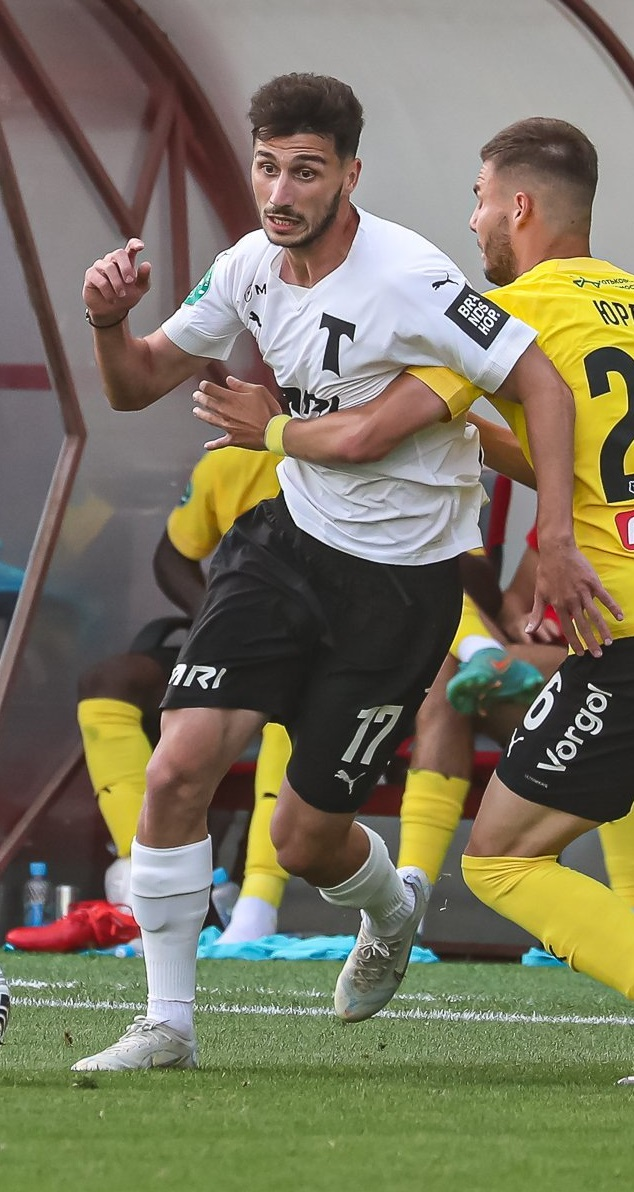
- Tsallagov with Torpedo Moscow in 2019

Personal information
- Full name: Dzambolat Anatolyevich Tsallagov
- Date of birth: 1 January 2000 (age 26)
- Place of birth: Vladikavkaz, Russia
- Height: 1.82 m (6 ft 0 in)
- Position: Midfielder

Team information
- Current team: Arsenal Dzerzhinsk
- Number: 11

Youth career
- 2007–2015: DYuSSh Yunost Vladikavkaz
- 2015: Krasnodar
- 2016: SDYuShOR Zenit Saint-Petersburg
- 2016–2019: Lokomotiv Moscow

Senior career*
Years	Team	Apps	(Gls)
2019–2020	Kazanka Moscow	9	(0)
2021–2022	Dainava	28	(0)
2022	→ SKA-Khabarovsk (loan)	12	(1)
2022	Torpedo Moscow	2	(0)
2022–2023	Kuban Krasnodar	14	(1)
2023–2024	SKA-Khabarovsk	10	(0)
2025	Dynamo St. Petersburg	10	(0)
2025–2026	Alania Vladikavkaz	5	(0)
2026–	Arsenal Dzerzhinsk	4	(0)
- * Club domestic league appearances and goals as of 7 September 2026

Dzambolat Anatolyevich Tsallagov (Russian: Дзамболат Анатольевич Цаллагов; born 1 January 2000) is a Russian football player.

== Club career ==
He made his debut in the Russian Professional Football League for Kazanka Moscow on 1 August 2019 in a game against Olimp Khimki.

He made his debut in the A Lyga for Dainava on 2 April 2021 in a game against Riteriai.

On 12 July 2022, Tsallagov signed a two-year contract (with an option for third year) with Russian Premier League club Torpedo Moscow. He made his RPL debut for Torpedo on 24 July 2022 against Dynamo Moscow. His Torpedo contract was terminated by mutual consent on 5 September 2022.

== Personal life ==
He is a cousin of Ibragim Tsallagov.

== Career statistics ==
As of 27 November 2022

Club	Season	League			Cup		Continental		Other		Total	
Club	Season	Division	Apps	Goals	Apps	Goals	Apps	Goals	Apps	Goals	Apps	Goals
Kazanka Moscow	2019-20	Second League	9	0	–		–		–		9	0
Dainava	2021	A Lyga	28	0	2	0	–		–		30	0
SKA-Khabarovsk	2021–22	First League	12	1	–		–		2 (Note: Appearances in the promotion play-offs)	0	14	1
Torpedo Moscow	2022–23	RPL	2	0	1	0	–		–		3	0
Kuban Krasnodar	2022–23	First League	6	0	2	0	–		–		8	0
Career total			57	1	5	0	0	0	2	0	64	1
