= Alyaksandr Aleksandrovich =

Belarusian footballer

Personal information
- Date of birth: 6 July 1997 (age 29)
- Place of birth: Pavlovichi, Vitebsk Oblast, Belarus
- Height: 1.81 m (5 ft 11 in)
- Position: Midfielder

Team information
- Current team: Orsha
- Number: 10

Youth career
- 2014–2015: DYuSSh Komsomolets Vitebsk

Senior career*
Years	Team	Apps	(Gls)
2015–2019	Vitebsk	13	(0)
2018–2019	→ Orsha (loan)	33	(1)
2020	Smolevichi	19	(0)
2021–2022	Tver	25	(1)
2022	Belshina Bobruisk	12	(0)
2023–2024	Dnepr Mogilev	40	(2)
2025	Dnepr Rogachev	6	(1)
2026	Naftan Novopolotsk	6	(0)
2026–	Orsha	7	(1)

International career
2015	Belarus U19		
- * Club domestic league appearances and goals as of 30 August 2026

Alyaksandr Aleksandrovich (Belarusian: Аляксандр Александровіч; Russian: Александр Александрович; born 6 July 1997) is a Belarusian professional footballer who plays for Orsha.
