= Pavel Bordukov =

Belarusian footballer

Personal information
- Date of birth: 10 April 1993 (age 33)
- Place of birth: Mogilev, Belarus
- Height: 1.74 m (5 ft 8 1/2 in)
- Position: Midfielder

Team information
- Current team: Orsha
- Number: 93

Youth career
- 2009–2013: Dnepr Mogilev

Senior career*
Years	Team	Apps	(Gls)
2011–2018	Dnepr Mogilev	119	(19)
2012	→ Dnepr-2 Mogilev	16	(0)
2019–2020	Belshina Bobruisk	46	(3)
2021–2025	Dnepr Mogilev	120	(4)
2026–	Orsha	13	(0)
- * Club domestic league appearances and goals as of 6 July 2026

Pavel Bordukov (Belarusian: Павел Бардукоў; Russian: Павел Бордуков; born 10 April 1993) is a Belarusian footballer playing currently for Orsha.
