= Ihor Voronkov =

Ukrainian and Belarusian footballer

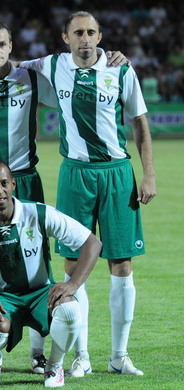

Personal information
- Full name: Ihor Serhiyovych Voronkov
- Date of birth: 24 April 1981 (age 45)
- Place of birth: Dzerzhynsk, Donetsk Oblast, Ukrainian SSR
- Height: 1.83 m (6 ft 0 in)
- Position: Defensive midfielder

Team information
- Current team: Arsenal Dzerzhinsk (manager)

Senior career*
Years	Team	Apps	(Gls)
2001	Uholyok Dymytrov	9	(0)
2003	Shakhtar Dzerzhynsk	2	(0)
2004–2006	Dnepr-Transmash Mogilev	88	(8)
2007–2009	Torpedo Zhodino	65	(4)
2010–2011	Minsk	65	(8)
2012	Gomel	30	(1)
2013	Belshina Bobruisk	31	(3)
2014–2015	Dinamo Minsk	33	(1)
2016	Slutsk	5	(0)
2016	Krumkachy Minsk	8	(0)
2017	Smolevichi-STI	29	(0)
2018–2019	Slavia Mozyr	47	(3)
2020	Arsenal Dzerzhinsk	21	(3)

Managerial career
- 2026–: Arsenal Dzerzhinsk
- * Club domestic league appearances and goals as of 31 December 2020

Ihor Serhiyovych Voronkov (Ukrainian: Ігор Сергійович Воронков; born 24 April 1981) is a Ukrainian and Belarusian former professional footballer.

== Career ==
He spent his entire senior career in Belarus and received Belarusian citizenship in 2010. As of 2020, he plays for Arsenal Dzerzhinsk.
