= Nikita Bobchenok =

Belarusian professional footballer

Personal information
- Date of birth: 4 September 1999 (age 27)
- Place of birth: Mogilev, Belarus
- Height: 1.76 m (5 ft 9 in)
- Position: Midfielder

Team information
- Current team: Orsha
- Number: 7

Youth career
- 2016–2018: Dnepr Mogilev

Senior career*
Years	Team	Apps	(Gls)
2019	Dnyapro Mogilev	1	(0)
2020–2021	Dnepr Mogilev	24	(5)
2021–2023	Orsha	51	(6)
2024	Energetik-BGU Minsk	31	(3)
2025–	Orsha	39	(2)
- * Club domestic league appearances and goals as of 6 July 2026

Nikita Bobchenok (Belarusian: Мікіта Бабчонак; Russian: Никита Бобченок; born 4 September 1999) is a Belarusian professional footballer who plays for Orsha.
