= Andrej Camaj =

Montenegrin footballer (born 2002)

Personal information
- Date of birth: 12 March 2006 (age 20)
- Place of birth: Podgorica, Serbia and Montenegro
- Height: 1.84 m (6 ft 0 in)
- Position: Forward

Team information
- Current team: Budućnost
- Number: 24

Youth career
- –2024: Budućnost

Senior career*
Years	Team	Apps	(Gls)
2024–	Budućnost	32	(5)

International career^{‡}
2021	Montenegro U15	3	(0)
2021	Montenegro U16	2	(1)
2022–2023	Montenegro U17	17	(3)
2023	Montenegro U18	2	(0)
2023–	Montenegro U19	18	(5)
- * Club domestic league appearances and goals as of 17 June 2026 ‡ National team caps and goals as of 11:09, 13 June 2025 (UTC)

Andrej Camaj (Montenegrin: Aндреј Цамај; born 12 March 2006) is a Montenegrin professional footballer who plays as a forward for Budućnost.

== Club career ==
At 17 years old Camaj, signed his first professional contract with Budućnost. Camaj suffered an injury in late 2024. On 16 March 2025, Camaj scored his first professional goal against Jezero in Berane at the City Stadium.

== Personal life ==
Andrej is the son of former player Albin Camaj
