= Gonçalo Moreira =

Portuguese footballer (born 2006)

Personal information
- Full name: Gonçalo Carvalho Moreira
- Date of birth: 3 January 2006 (age 20)
- Place of birth: Maia, Portugal
- Height: 1.84 m (6 ft 0 in)
- Position: Midfielder

Team information
- Current team: Benfica B
- Number: 77

Youth career
- 2013–2015: Pedrouços
- 2015–2016: CB Póvoa Lanhoso
- 2016–2018: CB Fafe
- 2013–2026: Benfica

Senior career*
Years	Team	Apps	(Gls)
2025–	Benfica B	31	(6)
2026–	Benfica	2	(0)

International career^{‡}
2022–2023	Portugal U17	18	(3)
2023–2024	Portugal U18	9	(1)
2024–2025	Portugal U19	9	(1)
2025–	Portugal U20	6	(2)
2026–	Portugal U21	3	(2)
- * Club domestic league appearances and goals as of 15:48, 22 September 2026 (UTC) ‡ National team caps and goals as of 18:10, 11 August 2026 (UTC)

Gonçalo Carvalho Moreira (born 3 January 2006) is a Portuguese professional footballer who plays as a midfielder for Benfica B.

== Club career ==
Born in Maia in the Porto metropolitan area, Moreira began playing as a youth for local club Pedrouços before entering CB Póvoa Lanhoso and CB Fafe, two affiliates of Benfica. He joined the club's academy in 2018. He signed his first professional contract in October 2022, while on four goals in eight games of the 2022–23 season, ending with 26 goals in 31 games as his team won the national youth title. In May 2024, having scored seven goals in 23 games for the under-23 team and three goals in nine games for the under-19s, he renewed his contract.

Moreira was promoted to the B-team ahead of the 2025–26 season. He made his debut in Liga Portugal 2 on 10 August in the opening game, and scored a penalty kick to open a 1–1 draw away to Chaves. On 16 September, in the UEFA Youth League group stage, he scored four goals in a 7–1 home win over Qarabağ, despite being substituted at half time. He was voted the Liga Portugal 2 young player of the month for March 2026 after scoring two goals, including the only one of the game against Farense, and contributing one assist. On 12 April, he made his first-team debut under José Mourinho, coming on as an added-time substitute for Andreas Schjelderup in a 2–0 victory over Nacional in the Primeira Liga.

== International career ==
Moreira was first called up by Portugal under-21 manager Luís Freire in March 2026, for 2027 UEFA European Under-21 Championship qualification matches against Azerbaijan and Scotland. He made his debut on 27 March and scored the first goal of a 4–0 win away in Baku, and four days later he scored again in a 3–0 home win over the Scots in Estoril.
