= Dmitriy Tikhomirov =

Belarusian footballer

Personal information
- Date of birth: 21 April 1999 (age 27)
- Place of birth: Minsk, Belarus
- Height: 1.82 m (6 ft 0 in)
- Position: Forward

Team information
- Current team: Orsha
- Number: 9

Youth career
- 2015–2019: Minsk

Senior career*
Years	Team	Apps	(Gls)
2019–2020	Minsk	2	(0)
2019	→ Naftan Novopolotsk (loan)	14	(3)
2020	→ Volna Pinsk (loan)	8	(0)
2020	→ Orsha (loan)	11	(5)
2022	Orsha	2	(0)
2023	Slonim-2017	15	(1)
2024	Orsha	28	(5)
2025	Baranovichi	13	(1)
2025	Lokomotiv Gomel	15	(0)
2026–	Orsha	9	(1)
- * Club domestic league appearances and goals as of 6 July 2026

Dmitriy Tikhomirov (Belarusian: Дзмітрый Ціхаміраў; Russian: Дмитрий Тихомиров; born 21 April 1999) is a Belarusian professional footballer who plays for Orsha.
