= Ivan Sulev =

Bulgarian footballer (born 2006)

Personal information
- Full name: Ivan Stoyanov Sulev
- Date of birth: 11 September 2006 (age 20)
- Place of birth: Plovdiv, Bulgaria
- Height: 1.84 m (6 ft 0 in)
- Position: Midfielder

Team information
- Current team: Cagliari
- Number: 32

Youth career
- 2013–2023: Lokomotiv Plovdiv
- 2023–: Cagliari

Senior career*
Years	Team	Apps	(Gls)
2021–2023	Lokomotiv Plovdiv II	5	(3)
2021–2023	Lokomotiv Plovdiv	8	(0)
2025–	Cagliari	0	(0)

International career^{‡}
2022	Bulgaria U17	3	(2)
- * Club domestic league appearances and goals as of 11:33, 1 February 2023 (UTC) ‡ National team caps and goals as of 11:33, 1 February 2023 (UTC)

Ivan Sulev (Bulgarian: Иван Сулев; born 11 September 2006) is a Bulgarian professional footballer who plays as a midfielder for Serie A club Cagliari.

== Club career ==
Sulev joined the youth academy of Lokomotiv Plovdiv at a young age in 2013 and progressed through the various youth categories of the club's academy. He made his first-team debut on 5 December 2021 in a league match against Slavia Sofia. At the age of 15 years, 2 months and 24 days, he became the youngest-ever player to appear for the club.

On 10 February 2023, he moved to Italian club Cagliari, joining their Primavera side.

== Career statistics ==
=== Club ===
As of 16 January 2022.

Club	Season	League			Cup		Continental		Other		Total	
Club	Season	Division	Apps	Goals	Apps	Goals	Apps	Goals	Apps	Goals	Apps	Goals
Lokomotiv Plovdiv	2021–22	First League	8	0	0	0	—		—		8	0
Career total			8	0	0	0	0	0	0	0	8	0
