= Ilya Vasin =

Russian footballer (born 2006)

Personal information
- Full name: Ilya Dmitriyevich Vasin
- Date of birth: 12 July 2006 (age 20)
- Place of birth: Bryansk, Russia
- Height: 1.92 m (6 ft 4 in)
- Position: Centre-forward

Team information
- Current team: Arsenal Dzerzhinsk
- Number: 9

Youth career
- –2018: Dynamo Bryansk
- 2018–2019: DYuSSh Partizan Bryansk
- 2019: Dynamo Bryansk
- 2019–2020: DYuSSh Partizan Bryansk
- 2021–2023: Dynamo Bryansk
- 2024: Fakel Voronezh

Senior career*
Years	Team	Apps	(Gls)
2024–	Fakel Voronezh	1	(0)
2024–2025	→ Kuban Krasnodar (loan)	13	(0)
2026–	→ Arsenal Dzerzhinsk (loan)	9	(2)
- * Club domestic league appearances and goals as of 3 July 2026

Ilya Dmitriyevich Vasin (Russian: Илья Дмитриевич Васин; born 12 July 2006) is a Russian football player who plays as a centre-forward for Belarusian Premier League club Arsenal Dzerzhinsk on loan from Fakel Voronezh.

== Career ==
On 6 August 2024, Vasin signed his first professional contract with Fakel Voronezh.

Vasin made his debut for Fakel on 27 August 2024 in a Russian Cup game against Rubin Kazan. He made his Russian Premier League debut for Fakel on 24 November 2024 against Dynamo Moscow.

On 3 December 2024, Vasin moved to Kuban Krasnodar on loan.
