= Ioannis Avramidis =

Greek para athlete

Personal information
- Native name: Ιωάννης Αβραμίδης
- Nationality: Greek

Sport
- Sport: Para athletics
- Disability class: T71
Medal record
Men's para-athletics
Representing Greece
World Championships
Bronze medal – third place	2025 New Delhi	100 m T71

Ioannis Avramidis (Greek: Ιωάννης Αβραμίδης) is a Greek frame runner who competes in T71 sprint events.

== Career ==
On 25 May 2025, Avramidis competed at the World Para Athletics Grand Prix event held in Nottwil, Switzerland, and won a gold medal in the 400 metres T71 event, with a world record time of 1:47.25. In September 2025, he competed at the 2025 World Para Athletics Championships and won a bronze medal in the 100 metres T71 event with a time of 25.25 seconds.

== Personal life ==
Avramidis was injured during pole vaulting training in 2019. He attends Aristotle University of Thessaloniki where he studies early childhood education.
