= Yuval Ranon =

Israeli footballer (born 2006)

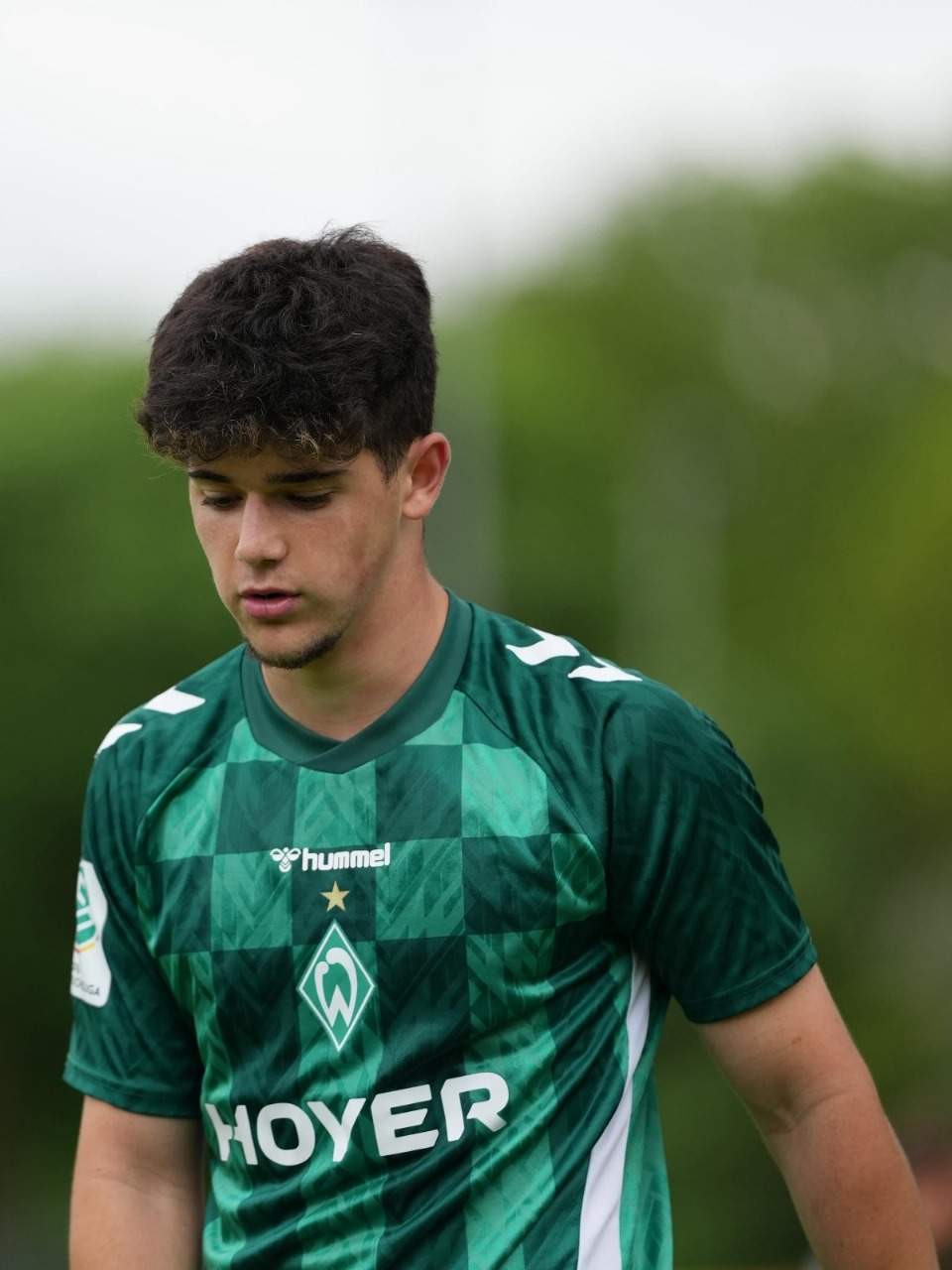
- Ranon with Werder Bremen

Personal information
- Date of birth: 11 February 2006 (age 20)
- Place of birth: Nahariya, Israel
- Positions: Forward; attacking midfielder

Team information
- Current team: Vitesse
- Number: 11

Youth career
- –2022: North Carolina FC
- 2022–2025: Werder Bremen

Senior career*
Years	Team	Apps	(Gls)
2025–	Vitesse	28	(2)

International career
2022–2023	Israel U17	8	(1)
2024–	Israel U19	5	(1)
- * Club domestic league appearances and goals as of 28 April 2026

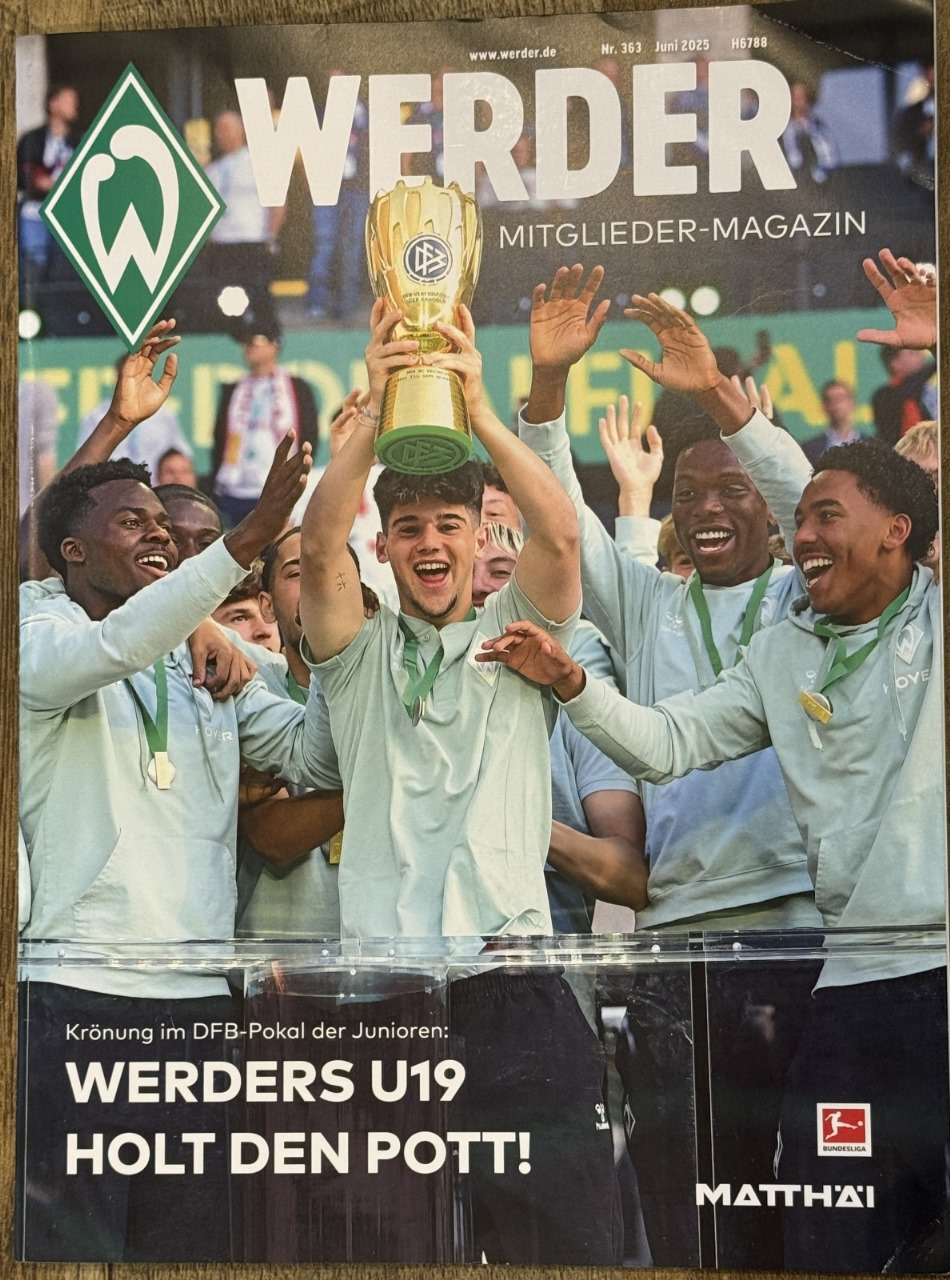

Yuval Ranon (Hebrew: יובל רנון; born 11 February 2006) is an Israeli footballer who plays as a forward and attacking midfielder for Eerste Divisie club Vitesse.

== Early life ==
Born in Nahariya, Ranon is the son of Barak Ranon and Antel Ranon. He moved with his family from Israel to North Carolina, United States at a young age.

== Career ==
Ranon started playing in the U.S. Soccer Development Academy around the age of 11.

Ranon moved to the youth academy of Bundesliga side Werder Bremen from North Carolina FC. With the club's U17 team he achieved fourth place in the Under 17 Bundesliga and second place in the play-offs in 2022–23 season, contributing as the team's top goalscorer.

In his first season with the U19 team of Werder Bremen, Ranon finished as the team's top goalscorer.

In his second year with the U19s, Ranon helped Werder Bremen win the DFB-Pokal Junioren, which was the club's first victory in the competition in its history, and was the tournament's top goalscorer per minutes played.

Ranon joined Eerste Divisie club Vitesse in September 2025.

== Style of play ==
Ranon mainly operates as a forward and has been described as a "poacher".
