= Maksim Pashkevich =

Belarusian footballer

Personal information
- Date of birth: 3 April 2002 (age 24)
- Place of birth: Smarhon, Belarus
- Position: Defender

Team information
- Current team: Orsha
- Number: 16

Youth career
- 2020–2021: Smorgon

Senior career*
Years	Team	Apps	(Gls)
2021–2023	Smorgon	9	(0)
2022	→ Osipovichi (loan)	10	(0)
2024	Slonim-2017	7	(1)
2024–2025	Energetik-BGU Minsk	19	(1)
2025	Slonim-2017	5	(0)
2026–	Orsha	12	(5)
- * Club domestic league appearances and goals as of 6 July 2026

Maksim Pashkevich (Belarusian: Максім Пашкевіч; Russian: Максим Пашкевич; born 3 April 2002) is a Belarusian professional footballer who plays for Orsha.
