= Martim Ferreira =

Portuguese footballer (born 2003)

Personal information
- Full name: Martim Augusto Ferreira
- Date of birth: 4 October 2003 (age 23)
- Place of birth: Cascais, Portugal
- Height: 1.68 m (5 ft 6 in)
- Position: Right back

Team information
- Current team: Lahti
- Number: 11

Youth career
- 2014–2017: Estoril
- 2017–2023: Benfica
- 2023–2024: Académico

Senior career*
Years	Team	Apps	(Gls)
2023–2024	Académico	9	(0)
2024–2025	Zabbar St. Patrick	13	(1)
2025–	Lahti	50	(10)

International career
2022	Portugal U20	1	(0)
- * Club domestic league appearances and goals as of 13 November 2026

Martim Augusto Ferreira (born 4 October 2003) is a Portuguese professional football player who plays as a right back for Lahti in Veikkausliiga.

== Club career ==
Ferreira played in the youth academies of Estoril Praia and Benfica in his native Portugal. He also played for Benfica in the UEFA Youth League.

In September 2023, he joined Académico Viseu and made nine appearances with the first team in Liga Portugal 2.

After playing for Zabbar St. Patrick in Maltese Premier League, in January 2025 Ferreira moved to Finland and joined newly relegated Lahti in the second-tier Ykkösliiga.

== Career statistics ==
As of 13 November 2026

Appearances and goals by club, season and competition
Club	Season	League			Cup		League cup (Note: Includes Ykkösliigacup)		Total	
Club	Season	Division	Apps	Goals	Apps	Goals	Apps	Goals	Apps	Goals
Académico	2023–24	Liga Portugal 2	9	0	0	0	0	0	9	0
Zabbar St. Patrick	2024–25	Maltese Premier League	13	1	0	0	–		13	1
Lahti	2025	Ykkösliiga	26	5	0	0	5	0	31	5
Lahti	2026	Veikkausliiga	24	5	5	0	2	0	31	5
Lahti	Total		50	10	5	0	7	0	62	10
Career total			72	11	5	0	7	0	84	11
