= Kubrat Onasci =

Bulgarian football player (born 2006)

Personal information
- Full name: Kubrat Koray Onasci
- Date of birth: 6 July 2006 (age 20)
- Place of birth: Sofia, Bulgaria
- Height: 1.85 m (6 ft 1 in)
- Position: Defender

Team information
- Current team: Septemvri Sofia
- Number: 13

Youth career
- 2013–2017: DIT Sofia
- 2017–2023: Septemvri Sofia

Senior career*
Years	Team	Apps	(Gls)
2022–2023	Septemvri Sofia II	22	(2)
2023–	Septemvri Sofia	88	(3)

International career^{‡}
2022–2023	Bulgaria U17	6	(2)
2023	Bulgaria U18	3	(0)
2024	Bulgaria U19	7	(0)
2025–	Bulgaria U21	6	(0)
- * Club domestic league appearances and goals as of 12:05, 18 October 2026 (UTC) ‡ National team caps and goals as of 12:05, 18 October 2026 (UTC)

Kubrat Onasci (Bulgarian: Кубрат Йонашчъ; born 6 July 2006) is a Bulgarian professional footballer who plays as a defender for Septemvri Sofia.

== Career ==
Onasci began his career in the local DIT academy at age of 7, which merged with Septemvri Sofia in 2015 with Onasci moving to the Septemvri in 2017. He joined first team training in 2022 at the age of 16. He complete his professional debut on 17 March 2023 in a league match against Cherno More. 10 days later he signed his first professional contract with the team. For the 2024 season Kubrat was named a team captain for the team in the First League.

== International career ==
In June 2022 he was called up for Bulgaria U16.

== Career statistics ==
=== Club ===
As of 24 September 2024

Club performance			League		Cup		Continental		Other		Total	
Club	League	Season	Apps	Goals	Apps	Goals	Apps	Goals	Apps	Goals	Apps	Goals
Bulgaria			League		Bulgarian Cup		Europe		Other (Note: Includes Promotion/relegation play-off matches.)		Total	
Septemvri Sofia	First League	2022–23	2	0	0	0	–		–		2	0
Septemvri Sofia	Second League	2023–24	19	1	1	0	–		–		20	1
Septemvri Sofia	First League	2024–25	6	1	0	0	–		–		6	1
Septemvri Sofia	Total		27	2	1	0	0	0	0	0	28	2
Career statistics			27	2	1	0	0	0	0	0	28	2
