= Jacob MacIntyre =

Scottish footballer

Personal information
- Date of birth: 29 January 2006 (age 20)
- Position: Midfielder

Team information
- Current team: Arbroath (on loan from Hibernian)
- Number: 30

Youth career
- 2015-2024: Hibernian

Senior career*
Years	Team	Apps	(Gls)
2024–	Hibernian	1	(0)
2024–2025	→ Kelty Hearts (loan)	25	(3)
2025–2026	→ Arbroath (loan)	29	(3)
2026–	→ Arbroath (loan)	7	(1)
- * Club domestic league appearances and goals as of 14:17, 28 October 2026 (UTC)

Jacob MacIntyre (born 29 January 2006) is a Scottish professional footballer who plays for Arbroath, on loan from Hibernian, as a midfielder.

== Career ==
MacIntyre joined the Hibs academy at nine years-old. In July 2022 he signed a professional contract with the club. He was named among the first-team match day substitutes on 27 July 2023 in the UEFA Europa Conference League against Inter Club d'Escaldes. He made his professional debut for Hibs on 16 March 2024 in a 3–0 win in the Scottish Premiership against Livingston.

MacIntyre was loaned to Kelty Hearts during the 2024–25 season and Arbroath in 2025–26.

He signed a new three-year contract with Hibs in summer 2026. He returned to Arbroath in September 2026, on a loan until January 2027.

== International career ==
In March 2023, he helped the Scotland U-17 team qualify for the 2023 UEFA European U-17 Championship. He was also subsequently then named in the Scotland U17 squad for the tournament.

== Personal life ==
His brother Oscar MacIntyre is also a professional footballer, who also came through the youth system at Hibernian. They are both cousins of professional golfer Robert MacIntyre.
