= Gleb Zheleznikov =

Belarusian footballer

Personal information
- Date of birth: 31 July 1997 (age 29)
- Place of birth: Orsha, Vitebsk Oblast, Belarus
- Height: 1.69 m (5 ft 6 1/2 in)
- Position: Midfielder

Team information
- Current team: Orsha
- Number: 77

Youth career
- 2014–2016: Belshina Bobruisk

Senior career*
Years	Team	Apps	(Gls)
2016	Belshina Bobruisk	1	(0)
2017	Orsha	6	(0)
2017	Osipovichi	12	(5)
2018	Volna Pinsk	14	(0)
2018–2021	Orsha	96	(15)
2022–2023	Dnepr Mogilev	25	(1)
2024	Orsha	32	(4)
2025	Dnepr Mogilev	31	(5)
2026–	Orsha	13	(1)
- * Club domestic league appearances and goals as of 6 July 2026

Gleb Zheleznikov (Belarusian: Глеб Жалезнікаў; Russian: Глеб Железников; born 31 July 1997) is a Belarusian professional footballer who plays for Orsha.
