= Vladislav Vasilyev (footballer, born 2004) =

Russian footballer

Personal information
- Full name: Vladislav Aleksandrovich Vasilyev
- Date of birth: 23 August 2004 (age 22)
- Place of birth: Moscow, Russia
- Height: 1.89 m (6 ft 2 in)
- Position: Defender

Team information
- Current team: Arsenal Dzerzhinsk
- Number: 46

Youth career
- 2011–2014: DYuSSh Olimpik-80 Moscow
- 2015–2023: Lokomotiv Moscow

Senior career*
Years	Team	Apps	(Gls)
2024	Kaluga	0	(0)
2024–2025	Murom	27	(0)
2025–	Arsenal Dzerzhinsk	20	(0)
- * Club domestic league appearances and goals as of 3 July 2026

Vladislav Aleksandrovich Vasilyev (Russian: Владислав Александрович Васильев; born 23 August 2004) is a Russian footballer who plays as a defender for Arsenal Dzerzhinsk.

He made his debut in the Russian Second League for Murom on 8 September 2024, in a game against Metallurg Lipetsk.

He made his debut in the Belarusian Premier League for Arsenal Dzerzhinsk on 2 August 2025 in a game against Dynamo Brest.
