= Belarusian Cup =

- Founded: 1992; 34 years ago
- Region: Belarus
- Teams: 52
- Qualifier for: UEFA Europa Conference League
- Domestic cup: Belarusian Super Cup
- Current champions: BATE Borisov (6th title)
- Most championships: BATE Borisov (6 titles)
- Website: abff.by
- 2026–27 Belarusian Cup

The Belarusian Cup (Belarusian: Кубак Беларусі, romanized: Kubak Belarusi) is an annual association football knock-out cup competition for men's football clubs of Belarus, organized by the Football Federation of Belarus.

Belarusian Cup was established in 1992. Each year the winning team qualifies for the UEFA Europa League.

== History and format ==
The cup is a traditional single-elimination tournament. Usually, the cup involves all clubs participating in Belarusian Premier League, First League and Second League, as well a small number of amateur clubs that can qualify through local amateur Cup competitions. Unlike the league season, Belarusian Cup is still played using a fall/spring schedule (while the League has switched to spring/fall schedule in 1995).

The most frequently used format of the cup included six rounds. Typically, the quarterfinals and semifinals are played after the winter break and consist of two-legged ties. However, both the schedule and the number of matches in each round can be adjusted depending on the availability of domestic match dates. The final match is traditionally played in May. Since 2013, the final is played at various venues across the country.

== Finals ==
Year	Winners	Runners-up	Score	Venue	Attendance
1992	Dinamo Minsk	Dnepr Mogilev	6–1	Dinamo Stadium, Minsk	2,500
1993	Neman Grodno	Vedrich Rechitsa	2–1	Dinamo Stadium, Minsk	11,000
1994	Dinamo Minsk	Fandok Bobruisk	3–1	Dinamo Stadium, Minsk	3,000
1995	Dinamo-93 Minsk	Torpedo Mogilev	1–1 (7–6 pen.)	Dinamo Stadium, Minsk	2,500
1996	MPKC Mozyr	Dinamo Minsk	4–1	Dinamo Stadium, Minsk	7,600
1997	Belshina Bobruisk	Dinamo-93 Minsk	2–0	Dinamo Stadium, Minsk	7,000
1998	Lokomotiv-96 Vitebsk	Dinamo Minsk	2–1 (a.e.t.)	Dinamo Stadium, Minsk	4,000
1999	Belshina Bobruisk	Slavia Mozyr	1–1 (4–2 pen.)	Dinamo Stadium, Minsk	4,500
2000	Slavia Mozyr	Torpedo-MAZ Minsk	2–1	Dinamo Stadium, Minsk	4,000
2001	Belshina Bobruisk	Slavia Mozyr	1–0 (a.e.t.)	Dinamo Stadium, Minsk	8,000
2002	Gomel	BATE Borisov	2–0	Dinamo Stadium, Vitebsk	3,600
2003	Dinamo Minsk	Lokomotiv Minsk	2–0	Dinamo Stadium, Minsk	12,000
2004	Shakhtyor Soligorsk	Gomel	1–0 (a.e.t.)	Dinamo Stadium, Minsk	8,500
2005	MTZ-RIPO Minsk	BATE Borisov	2–1	Dinamo Stadium, Minsk	15,500
2006	BATE Borisov	Shakhtyor Soligorsk	3–1 (a.e.t.)	Dinamo Stadium, Minsk	5,200
2007	Dynamo Brest	BATE Borisov	0–0 (4–3 pen.)	Dinamo Stadium, Minsk	9,500
2008	MTZ-RIPO Minsk	Shakhtyor Soligorsk	2–1	Dinamo Stadium, Minsk	8,500
2009	Naftan Novopolotsk	Shakhtyor Soligorsk	2–1 (a.e.t.)	Dinamo Stadium, Minsk	9,000
2010	BATE Borisov	Torpedo Zhodino	5–0	Dinamo Stadium, Minsk	10,200
2011	Gomel	Neman Grodno	2–0	Traktor Stadium, Minsk	9,000
2012	Naftan Novopolotsk	Minsk	2–2 (4–3 pen.)	Dinamo Stadium, Minsk	9,800
2013	Minsk	Dinamo Minsk	1–1 (4–1 pen.)	Torpedo Stadium, Zhodino	5,200
2014	Shakhtyor Soligorsk	Neman Grodno	1–0	Borisov Arena, Borisov	11,000
2015	BATE Borisov	Shakhtyor Soligorsk	4–1	Central Stadium, Gomel	9,100
2016	Torpedo-BelAZ Zhodino	BATE Borisov	0–0 (3–2 pen.)	OSK Brestskiy, Brest	4,500
2017	Dynamo Brest	Shakhtyor Soligorsk	1–1 (10–9 pen.)	Neman Stadium, Grodno	8,479
2018	Dynamo Brest	BATE Borisov	3–2	Spartak Stadium, Mogilev	7,200
2019	Shakhtyor Soligorsk	Vitebsk	2–0	Vitebsky CSK, Vitebsk	7,954
2020	BATE Borisov	Dynamo Brest	1–0 (a.e.t.)	Dinamo Stadium, Minsk	5,700
2021	BATE Borisov	Isloch Minsk Raion	2–1	Central Stadium, Gomel	6,253
2022	Gomel	BATE Borisov	2–1	Dinamo Stadium, Minsk	10,587
2023	Torpedo-BelAZ Zhodino	BATE Borisov	2–0	Dinamo Stadium, Minsk	21,058
2024	Neman Grodno	Isloch Minsk Raion	2–0	Torpedo Stadium, Zhodino	5,714
2025	Neman Grodno	Torpedo-BelAZ Zhodino	3–0	Neman Stadium, Grodno	8,311
2026	BATE Borisov	Dinamo Minsk	1–1 (8–7 pen.)	National Stadium, Minsk	21,137

== Soviet time winners ==
Finals before independence were:

- 1936 Dinamo (Minsk) 3–1 Spartak (Minsk)
- 1939 IFK Minsk 6–1 Spartak (Bobruysk)
- 1940 Dinamo (Minsk) 1–0 DKA (Minsk)
- 1945 ODO (Minsk) 1–0 Dinamo II (Minsk)
- 1946 ODO (Minsk) 4–0 KVT Brest
- 1947 Torpedo (Minsk) 8–0 Dinamo (Beranovichi)
- 1948 Sbornoya Borisova (Borisov) 3–0 Dinamo (Brest)
- 1949 ODO (Bobruysk) 2–0 Torpedo (Minsk)
- 1950 ODO (Minsk) 2–1 Torpedo (Minsk)
- 1951 ODO (Minsk) 9–1 Spartak (Bobruysk)
- 1952 Spartak (Minsk) 3–0 ODO (Minsk)
- 1953 Spartak (Minsk) 10–0 Stroitel (Mozyr)
- 1954 Torpedo (Vitebsk) 4–1 KMO Minsk
- 1955 Burevestnik (Minsk) 4–1 KMO Minsk
- 1956 Minsk Rayona 3–0 Mogilev Rayona
- 1957 Sputnik (Minsk) 4–1 Komanda Molototskogo Rayona
- 1958 MTZ Minsk 1–1 (1–0 replay) Sbornaya Borisova
- 1959 Plant Voroshilova (Minsk) 6–2 Borisov Rayona
- 1960 Sputnik (Minsk) 0–0 (3–2 replay) Traktor (Minsk)
- 1961 Sputnik (Minsk) 3–2 Traktor (Minsk)
- 1962 Torpedo (Minsk) 1–0 Sputnik (Minsk)
- 1963 Sputnik (Minsk) 1–0 Spartak (Minsk)
- 1964 Gvardeyets (Minsk) 3–1 Narocha (Molodechno)
- 1965 Neftianik (Novopolotsk) 1–0 Lokomotiv (Brest)
- 1966 Sputnik (Minsk) 2–0 Mebelschik (Bobruysk)
- 1967 Sputnik (Minsk) 1–0 Torpedo (Minsk)
- 1968 Torpedo (Minsk) 2–1 Spartak (Minsk)
- 1969 Torpedo (Zhodino) 3–1 Universitet (Gomel)
- 1970 Sputnik (Minsk) 1–1 (2–0 replay) Torpedo (Zhodino)
- 1971 Torpedo (Zhodino) 4–0 2–1 Start (Orsha)
- 1972 Torpedo (Zhodino) 2–0 Obuvschik (Lida)
- 1973 Orbita (Minsk) 2–0 Stroitel (Bobruysk)
- 1974 Stroitel (Bobruysk) 1–0 Orbita (Minsk)
- 1975 Stroitel (Bobruysk) 1–0 Temp (Orsha)
- 1976 Bate (Borisov) 2–0 Burevestnik (Minsk)
- 1977 Torpedo (Zhodino) 3–1 Shinnik (Bobruysk)
- 1978 Torpedo (Zhodino) 2–1 Burevestnik (Minsk)
- 1979 Shinnik (Bobruysk) 3–1 Pedinstitut (Brest)
- 1980 Burevestnik (Minsk) 3–1 Shinnik (Bobruysk)
- 1981 Torpedo (Zhodino) 4–4 Impuls (Grodno) a.e.t., 5–4 pen.]
- 1982 Torpedo (Zhodino) 3–0 Obuvschik (Lida)
- 1983 Torpedo (Zhodino) 1–0 Impuls (Gomel)
- 1984 Orbita (Minsk) 2–0 Torpedo (Zhodino)
- 1985 Shakhtyor (Soligorsk) 3–1 Olimp (Grodno)
- 1986 Shakhtyor (Soligorsk) 3–0 Sputnik (Minsk)
- 1987 SKIF Minsk 1–1 Temp (Orsha) a.e.t., 4–2 pen.]
- 1988 Shakhtyor (Soligorsk) 0–0 Sputnik (Minsk) a.e.t., 4–3 pen.]
- 1989 Sputnik (Minsk) 8–2 Pedinstitut (Brest)
- 1990 Metallurg (Molodechno) 2–1 SKIF-ShVSM Minsk a.e.t.]
- 1991 Metallurg (Molodechno) 2–0 Shinnik (Bobruysk)

== Performance by club ==
Performance since independence.

Club	Wins	Winning years	Runners-up	Runners-up years
BATE Borisov	6	2006, 2010, 2015, 2020, 2021, 2026	7	2002, 2005, 2007, 2016, 2018, 2022, 2023
Shakhtyor Soligorsk	3	2004, 2014, 2019	5	2006, 2008, 2009, 2015, 2017
Dinamo Minsk	3	1992, 1994, 2003	4	1996, 1998, 2013, 2026
Neman Grodno	3	1993, 2024, 2025	2	2011, 2014
Dynamo Brest	3	2007, 2017, 2018	1	2020
Gomel	3	2002, 2011, 2022	1	2004
Belshina Bobruisk	3	1997, 1999, 2001	0	
Slavia Mozyr	2	1996, 2000	2	1999, 2001
Torpedo-BelAZ Zhodino	2	2016, 2023	2	2010, 2025
MTZ-RIPO Minsk	2	2005, 2008	0	
Naftan Novopolotsk	2	2009, 2012	0	
Dinamo-93 Minsk	1	1995	1	1997
Minsk	1	2013	1	2012
Vitebsk	1	1998	1	2019
Isloch Minsk Raion	0		2	2021, 2024
Dnepr Mogilev	0		1	1992
Vedrich Rechitsa	0		1	1993
Fandok Bobruisk	0		1	1994
Torpedo Mogilev	0		1	1995
Torpedo-MAZ Minsk	0		1	2000
Lokomotiv Minsk	0		1	2003
