= FC Arsenal Dzerzhinsk =

Arsenal Dzerzhinsk
- Full name: Football Club Arsenal Dzerzhinsk
- Founded: 2019; 7 years ago
- Ground: City Stadium, Dzerzhinsk
- Capacity: 1,000
- Chairman: Aleksey Meleshkevich
- Manager: Ihor Voronkov
- League: Belarusian Premier League
- 2025: Belarusian Premier League, 11th of 16
| Home colours | Away colours |

FC Arsenal Dzerzhinsk (Belarusian: ФК Арсенал Дзяржынск, romanized: FK Arsenal Dzyarzhynsk; Russian: ФК Арсенал Дзержинск) is a Belarusian professional football club from Dzerzhinsk, Minsk Oblast. The club currently plays in the Belarusian Premier League.

== History ==
The club was founded in 2019 and joined the Belarusian Second League the same year. They won the Second League in their debut season, and made their Belarusian First League debut in 2020. They won the First League in their debut season, and made their Belarusian Premier League debut in 2022. They were relegated from the Premier League for the 2023 season, after one season in the top tier, after losing the promotion-relegation play-off against FC Rogachev (now FC Maxline Vitebsk) 4-5 on aggregate.

== Current squad ==
As of 8 September 2026

Note: Flags indicate national team as defined under FIFA eligibility rules; some limited exceptions apply. Players may hold more than one non-FIFA nationality.

| No. | Pos. | Nation | Player |
|---|---|---|---|
| 1 | GK | BLR | Ivan Sanko |
| 2 | DF | BLR | Egor Bozhko (on loan from Maxline Vitebsk) |
| 4 | DF | BLR | Eduard Akunets |
| 7 | FW | BLR | Mark Mokin (on loan from Baltika-2) |
| 8 | MF | BLR | Nikita Kaplenko |
| 9 | FW | RUS | Ilya Vasin (on loan from Fakel Voronezh) |
| 10 | MF | BLR | Sergey Sazonchik |
| 11 | FW | RUS | Dzambolat Tsallagov |
| 13 | MF | BLR | Ivan Oreshkevich |
| 16 | GK | BLR | Artyom Vashchenko |
| 18 | MF | BLR | Daniel Volskiy (on loan from Fortuna Minsk) |
| 19 | MF | BLR | Aleksandr Veretennikov |
| 23 | DF | BLR | Denis Polyakov |

| No. | Pos. | Nation | Player |
|---|---|---|---|
| 26 | MF | RUS | Vadim Tkachenko |
| 30 | GK | BLR | Artyom Soroko |
| 31 | DF | BLR | Andrey Zaleski |
| 33 | FW | BLR | Valery Gorbachik |
| 34 | GK | BLR | Daniil Martinovich |
| 41 | FW | BLR | Dmitriy Lutik |
| 46 | DF | RUS | Vladislav Vasilyev |
| 69 | MF | RUS | Roman Yermolin |
| 71 | MF | RUS | Maksim Matveev |
| 77 | MF | BLR | Nikolay Sotnikov |
| 79 | MF | RUS | Khetag Badoev |
| 90 | FW | BLR | Dmitry Antilevsky |

=== Out on loan ===
Note: Flags indicate national team as defined under FIFA eligibility rules; some limited exceptions apply. Players may hold more than one non-FIFA nationality.

| No. | Pos. | Nation | Player |
|---|---|---|---|
| 99 | FW | BLR | Ivan Tolkachev (at Unixlabs Minsk) |
| — | FW | BLR | Dmitriy Matyash (at Volna Pinsk) |
