= Artyom =

Russian masculine given name

- Pronunciation: [ɐrˈtʲɵm]
- Gender: Masculine
- Language: Russian

Origin
- Origin: Ancient Greek: Αρτέμιος
- Meaning: 'pertaining to Artemis'

Other names
- Alternative spelling: Artem, Artiom
- Nickname: Tyoma

Artyom (Russian: Артём) is a Russian male given name. It is related to the name Artemy. The name is derived from the Ancient Greek name Artemios (Greek: Αρτέμιος), the name of the saint Artemius (cf. Dmitry (from Demeter), Denis (from Dionis)). A common diminutive form of the name is Tyoma (Тёма).

The name uses the letter "ё", which can be transcribed to English as "e" but still has the "yo" sound. In cases where the letter "ё" is not used, the name may be written as "Артем" (Artem). The Belarusian equivalent is Artsyom (Belarusian: Арцём).

Variants include Artsyom (Belarusian: Арцём) and the Moldovan Artiom.

== Politics ==
- Artyom Bichayev (born 1990), Russian politician
- Artyom Kavinov (born 1969), Russian politician
- Artyom Kiryanov (born 1977), Russian politician
- Artyom Malashchenkov (born 1980), Russian politician
- Artyom Sergeyev (1921–2008), Adopted son of Joseph Stalin
- Artyom Sheynin (born 1966), Russian television presenter and government spokesperson
- Artyom Tarasov (1950–2017), Russian political activist
- Artyom Zdunov (born 1978), Russian politician

=== Dissidents ===
- Comrade Artyom, nickname of Fyodor Sergeyev (1883–1921), Soviet revolutionary, later politician, active in Ukraine
- Artyom Loskutov (born 1986), Russian political activist and performance artist
- Artyom Vesyoly (1899–1938), Russian author and victim of the Great Purge

== Ice hockey ==
- Artyom Alyayev (born 1995), Russian ice hockey player
- Artyom Argokov (born 1976), Kazakhstani ice hockey player
- Artyom Artemyev (born 1993), Russian ice hockey goaltender
- Artyom Borodkin (born 1991), Russian ice hockey player
- Artyom Chernov (1982–2020), Russian ice hockey player
- Artyom Dorofeyev (born 1992), Russian ice hockey player
- Artyom Dubinin (born 1989), Russian ice hockey player
- Artyom Galimov (born 1999), Russian ice hockey center
- Artyom Gareyev (born 1992), Russian ice hockey forward
- Artyom Garifulin (born 1990), Russian ice hockey player
- Artyom Gordeyev (born 1988), Russian ice hockey player
- Artyom Ignatenko (born 1990), Kazakh ice hockey forward
- Artyom Kisly (born 1989), Belarusian ice hockey forward
- Artyom Kryukov (born 1982), Russian ice hockey forward
- Artyom Levshunov (born 2005), Belarusian ice hockey player
- Artyom Likhotnikov (born 1994), Kazakh ice hockey player
- Artyom Lukoyanov (born 1989), Russian ice hockey player
- Artyom Minulin (born 1998), Russian ice hockey defenseman
- Artyom Pugolovkin (born 1992), Russian ice hockey player
- Artyom Sedunov (born 1988), Russian ice hockey defenseman
- Artyom Senkevich (born 1982), Belarusian ice hockey player
- Artyom Serikov (born 2000), Russian ice hockey defenseman
- Artyom Shvets-Rogovoy (born 1995), Russian ice hockey forward
- Artyom Vaszjunyin (born 1984), Ukrainian-born Hungarian ice hockey player
- Artyom Volkov (born 1985), Belarusian ice hockey right wing
- Artyom Zagidulin (born 1995), Russian ice hockey player
- Artyom Zemchyonok (born 1991), Russian ice hockey player

== Association football ==
- Artyom Abramov (born 1991), Russian footballer
- Artyom Alimov (born 1986), Russian footballer
- Artyom Anisimov (footballer) (born 1991), Russian footballer
- Artyom Antipov (born 1988), Russian footballer
- Artyom Arkhipov (born 1996), Russian footballer
- Artyom Avanesyan (born 1999), Armenian footballer
- Artyom Bandikyan (born 2005), Armenian football full back
- Artyom Beketov (born 1984), Russian footballer
- Artyom Bezrodny (born 1979), Russian footballer
- Artyom Bludnov (born 1988), Russian footballer
- Artyom Chelyadinsky (born 1977), Belarusian footballer
- Artyom Chistyakov (born 2007), Russian football defender
- Artyom Danilenko (born 1990), Russian footballer
- Artyom Delkin (born 1990), Russian footballer
- Artyom Denisenko (born 1999), Belarusian footballer
- Artyom Dokuchayev (born 2001), Russian footballer
- Artyom Drobyshev (born 1980), Russian footballer
- Artyom Dudolev (born 1991), Russian footballer
- Artyom Dylevsky (born 1997), Belarusian football center back
- Artyom Dzyuba (born 1988), Russian footballer
- Artyom Falyan (1919–1977), Soviet-Armenian footballer
- Artyom Fedchuk (born 1994), Russian football forward
- Artyom Fedyanin (born 1994), Belarusian footballer
- Artyom Fidler (born 1983), Russian footballer
- Artyom Filiposyan (born 1988), Uzbek footballer
- Artyom Fomin (born 1988), Russian footballer
- Artyom Fyodorov (born 1984), Russian footballer
- Artyom Galadzhan (born 1998), Russian footballer
- Artyom Golubev (born 1999), Russian footballer
- Artyom Gorlov (born 1987), Russian football coach
- Artyom Gurenko (born 1994), Belarusian footballer
- Artyom Isik (born 2002), Russian footballer
- Artyom Kabanov (born 1984), Russian footballer
- Artyom Karatay (born 2002), Belarusian football goalie
- Artyom Karpukas (born 2002), Russian footballer
- Artyom Kasimov (born 2003), Russian football center back
- Artyom Kazakov (born 1990), Russian footballer
- Artyom Khachaturov (born 1992), Moldovan-born Armenian footballer
- Artyom Khmarin (born 2007), Russian footballer
- Artyom Kiyko (born 1996), Belarusian footballer
- Artyom Kotik (born 2001), Russian footballer
- Artyom Korzhunov (born 1995), Russian football midfielder
- Artyom Kovalenko (born 1981), Russian football midfielder
- Artyom Kuchin (born 1977), Kazakhstani referee
- Artyom Kulesha (born 1990), Russian footballer
- Artyom Kulikov (born 1987), Russian football manager
- Artyom Kulishev (born 1993), Russian footballer
- Artyom Leonov (born 1994), Russian footballer
- Artyom Lopatkin (born 1975), Russian footballer
- Artyom Madilov (born 1985), Russian footballer
- Artyom Makarchuk (born 1995), Russian footballer
- Artyom Makavchik (born 2000), Belarusian footballer
- Artyom Maksimenko (born 1998), Russian footballer
- Artyom Mamin (born 1997), Russian footballer
- Artyom Meshchaninov (born 1996), Russian footballer
- Artyom Mikaelyan (born 1991), Armenian footballer
- Artyom Mikheyev (born 1987), Russian footballer
- Artyom Mitasov (born 1990), Russian footballer
- Artyom Molodtsov (born 1990), Russian footballer
- Artyom Moskvin (born 1988), Russian footballer
- Artyom Motov (born 1990), Russian footballer
- Artýom Nazarow (born 1977), Turkmen footballer
- Artyom Ntumba (born 2003), Russo-Congolese footballer
- Artyom Pasko (born 1992), Russo-Kazkah footballer
- Artyom Pershin (born 1998), Russian footballer
- Artyom Petrenko (born 1986), Russian footballer
- Artyom Pogosov (born 1999), Russian footballer
- Artyom Ponikarov (born 1997), Russian football defender
- Artyom Poplevchenkov (born 2000), Russian footballer
- Artyom Popov (born 1992), Russian footballer
- Artyom Prokhorov (born 1989), Russian footballer
- Artyom Rebrov (born 1984), Russian footballer
- Artyom Roshchin (born 1993), Russian footballer
- Artyom Samsonov (footballer, born 1989), Russian footballer
- Artyom Samsonov (footballer, born 1994), Russian footballer
- Artyom Sapozhkov (born 1990), Russian footballer
- Artyom Sarychev (born 2000), Russian football defender
- Artyom Semeykin (born 1996), Russian footballer
- Artyom Serdyuk (born 1990), Russian footballer
- Artyom Shabolin (born 2000), Russian footballer
- Artyom Shchadin (born 1992), Russian footballer
- Artyom Shmykov (born 2002), Russian football center back
- Artyom Shumansky (born 2004), Belarusian football forward
- Artyom Sidorenko (born 2007), Russian football midfielder
- Artyom Simonyan (footballer) (born 1995), Armenian footballer
- Artyom Smirnov (footballer) (born 1989), Russian footballer
- Artyom Sobol (born 1996), Russian footballer
- Artyom Sokol (Belarusian footballer) (born 1994), Belarusian football center-back
- Artyom Sokol (Russian footballer) (born 1997), Russian football left-back
- Artyom Sokolov (born 2003), Russian footballer
- Artyom Soroko (born 1992), Belarusian footballer
- Artyom Stepanov (born 1988), Russian footballer
- Artyom Sukhanov (born 2001), Russian footballer
- Artyom Timofeyev (footballer) (born 1994), Russian footballer
- Artyom Tretyakov (born 1994), Russian football forward
- Artyom Varakin (born 1987), Russian footballer
- Artyom Varganov (born 2004), Russian football defender
- Artyom Vasev (born 1995), Russian football defender
- Artyom Voronkin (born 1986), Russian footballer
- Artyom Voropayev (born 1999), Russian footballer
- Artyom Vyatkin (born 1996), Russian footballer
- Artyom Yarmolitsky (born 1994), Russian footballer
- Artyom Yenin (1976–2024), Russian footballer
- Artyom Yuran (born 1997), Russian footballer
- Artyom Yusupov (born 1997), Russian footballer
- Artyom Zagrebin (born 1988), Russian footballer

== Other sportspeople ==
- Artyom Antropov (born 2000), Kazakh weightlifter
- Artyom Arefyev (born 1984), Russian athlete
- Artyom Gankin (born 1991), Kazakh archer
- Artyom Hovhannisyan, full name of Art Hovhannisyan (born 1981), Armenian boxer
- Artyom Khadjibekov (born 1970), Russian sport shooter
- Artyom Kosov (born 1986), Russian rower
- Artyom Kozlyuk (born 1998), Uzbek swimmer
- Artyom Krikunov (born 1996), Kazakh speed skater
- Artyom Kuptsov (born 1984), Russian pole vaulter
- Artyom Kuznetsov (born 1987), Russian speed skater
- Artyom Primak (born 1993), Russian long jumper
- Artyom Sedov (born 1984), Russian fencer
- Artyom Shaloyan (born 1976), Armenian-born German weightlifter
- Artyom Simonyan (born 1975), Armenian boxer
- Artyom Zakharov (born 1991), Kazakh cyclist

== Miscellaneous ==
- Artyom Alikhanian (1908–1978), Soviet Armenian physicist
- Artyom Anoufriev (born 1992), Russian serial killer part of a duo that killed six people
- Artyom Bogucharsky (born 1989), Russian actor
- Artyom Borovik (1960–2000), Russian journalist
- Artyom Bystrov (born 1985), Russian actor
- Artyom Dervoed (born 1981), Russian classical guitarist
- Artyom Gabrelyanov (born 1987), Russian writer
- Artyom Geghamyan (born 1980), Armenian lawyer
- Artyom Grabovoi (1983–2014), Russian serial killer and rapist
- Artyom Kacher (born 1988), Russian rapper
- Artyom Kirpichenok (born 1975), Russian historian
- Artyom Kobzev (born 1953), Russian sinologist
- Artyom Melikhov, Russian tenor singer
- Artyom Novichonok (born 1988), Russian astronomer
- Artyom Shneyerov (died 2017), Russian-Canadian microeconomist
- Artyom Timofeev (chess player) (born 1985), Russian chess player
- Artyom Tkachenko (born 1982), Russian actor

== Fictional characters ==
- Artyom Chyornyi, the main character of the books Metro 2033 and Metro 2035, as well as the games Metro 2033, Metro: Last Light, and Metro Exodus
- Artyom Popov, another Artyom in the book Metro 2034

== See also ==
- Artemy
- Artem
- Artsyom
- Alexander Artyom (1842–1914), Russian stage actor
