= List of people from Samara =

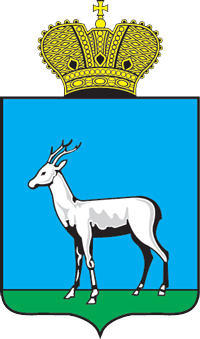
Coat of Arms of Samara

This is a list of notable people who were born or have lived in Samara (1935–1990: Kuybyshev), Russia.

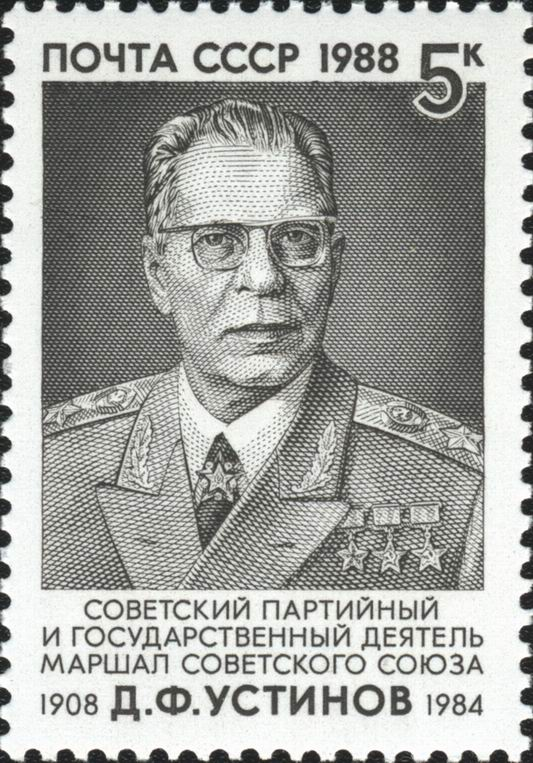
Dmitriy Ustinov

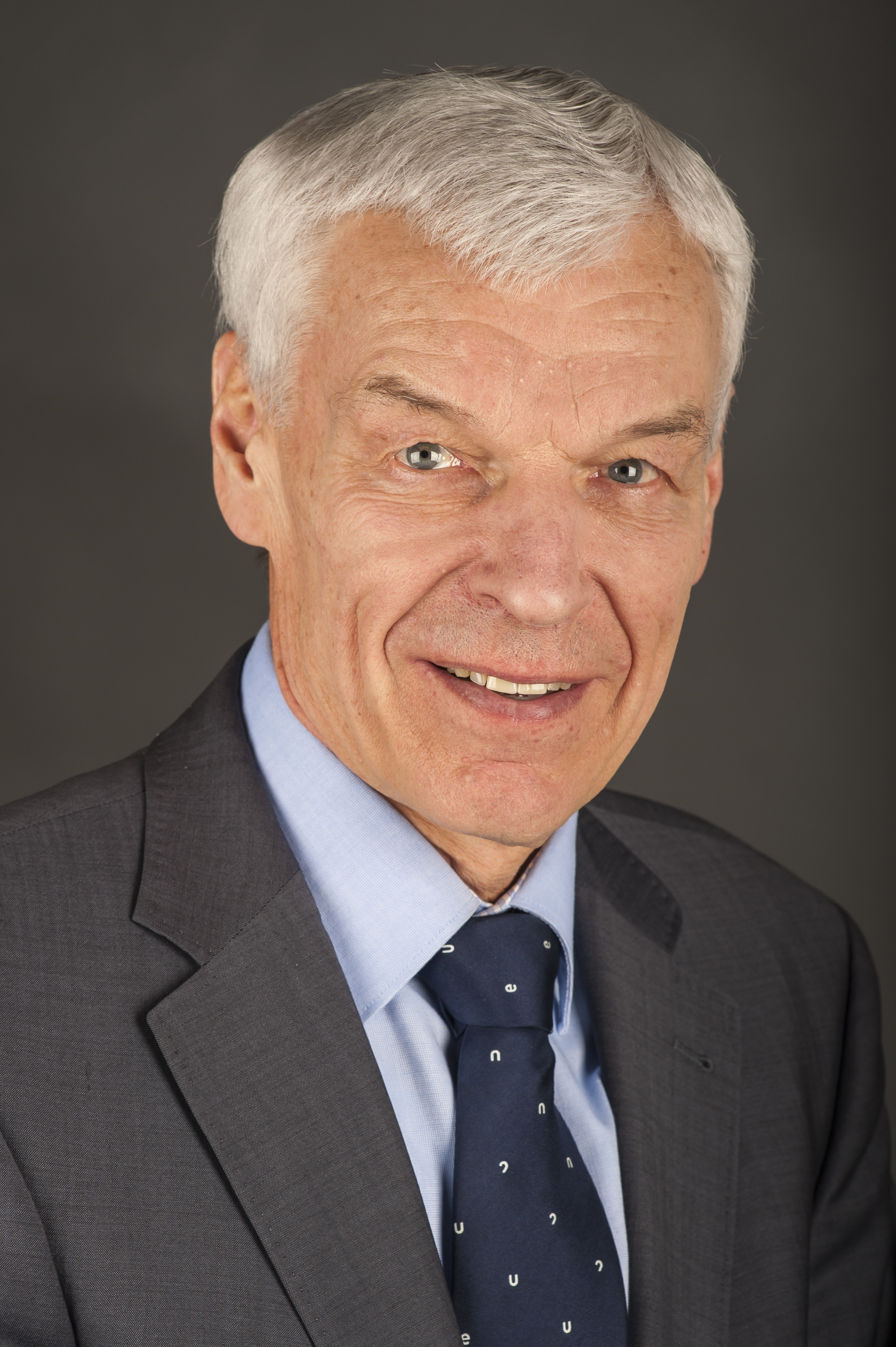
Justas Vincas Paleckis

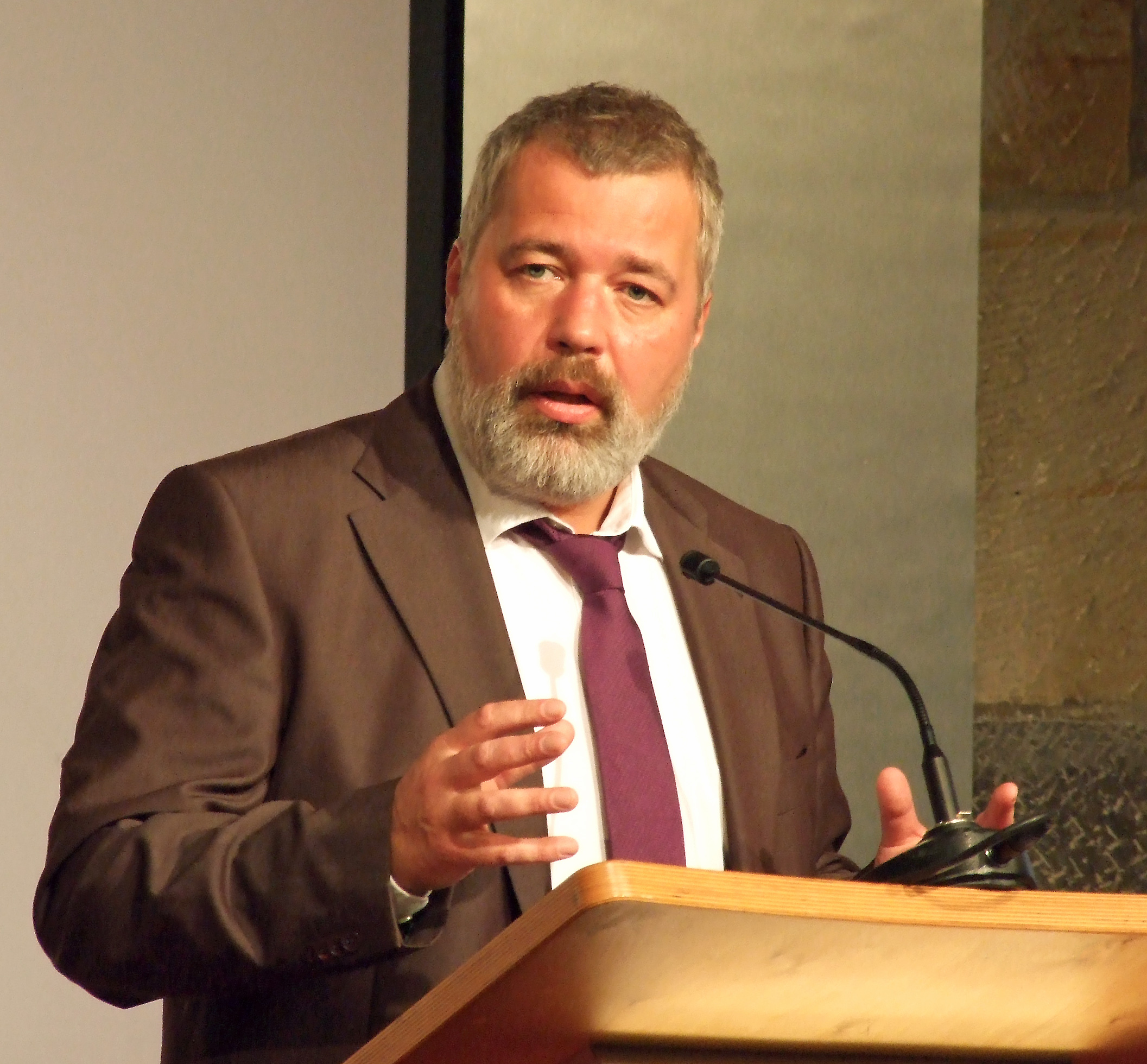
Dmitry Muratov

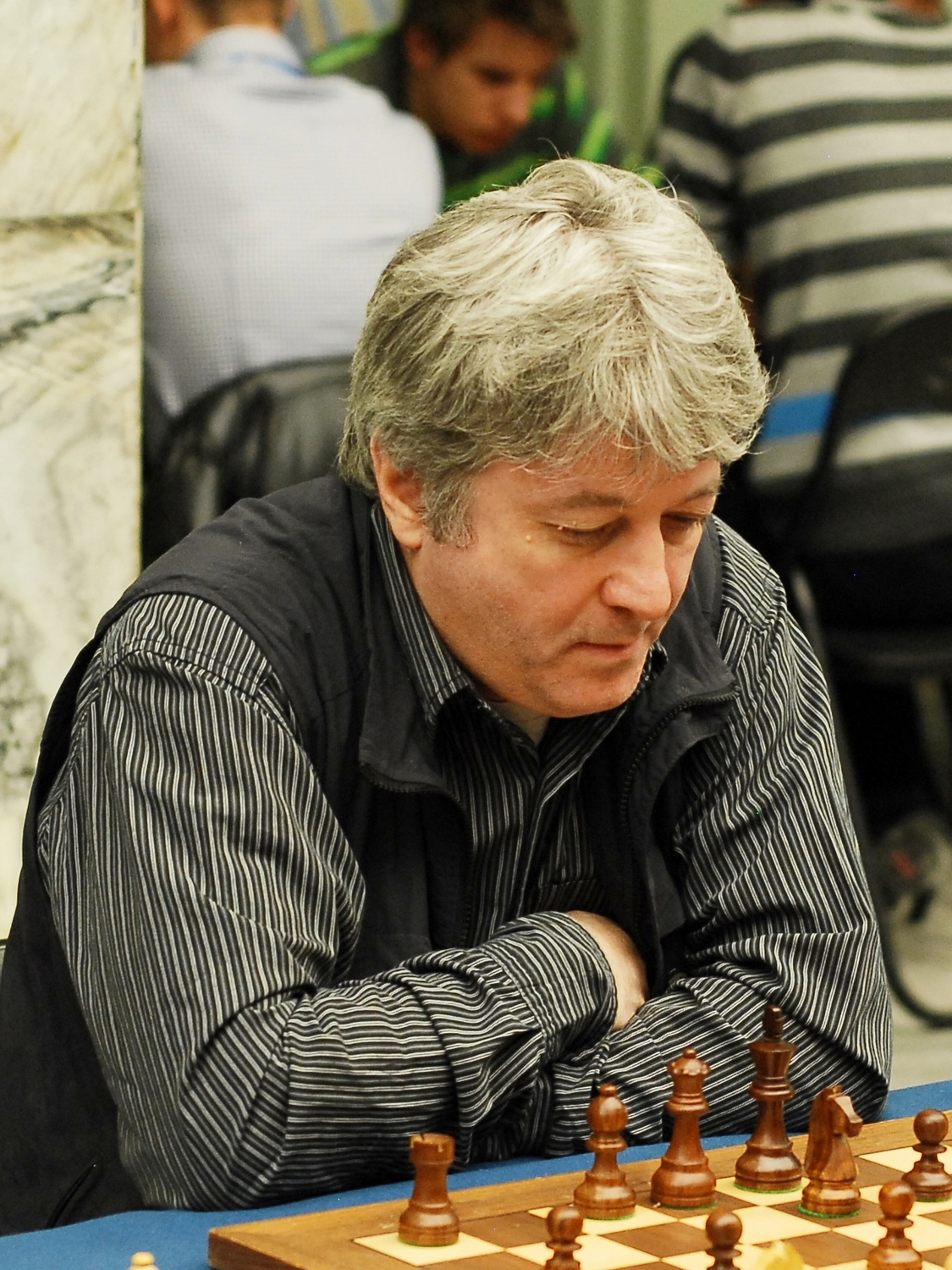
Yuri Yakovich

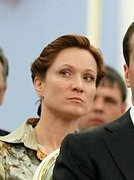
Mariya Kiselyova

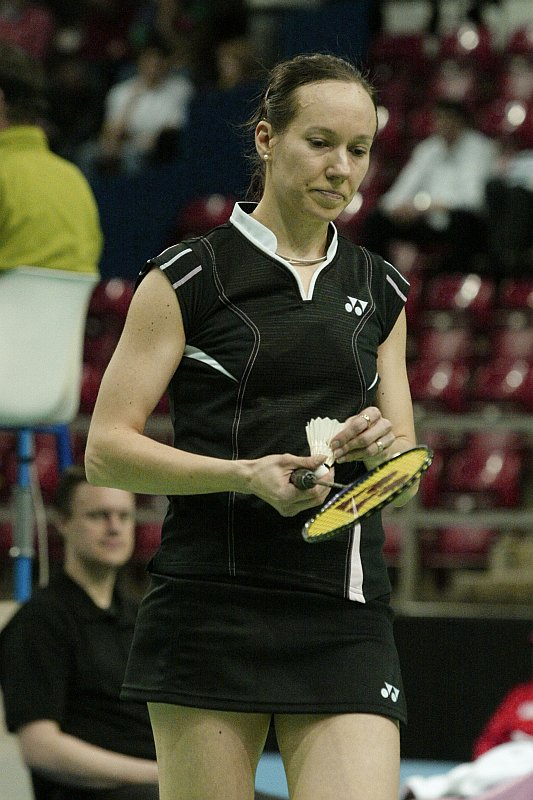
Ella Diehl

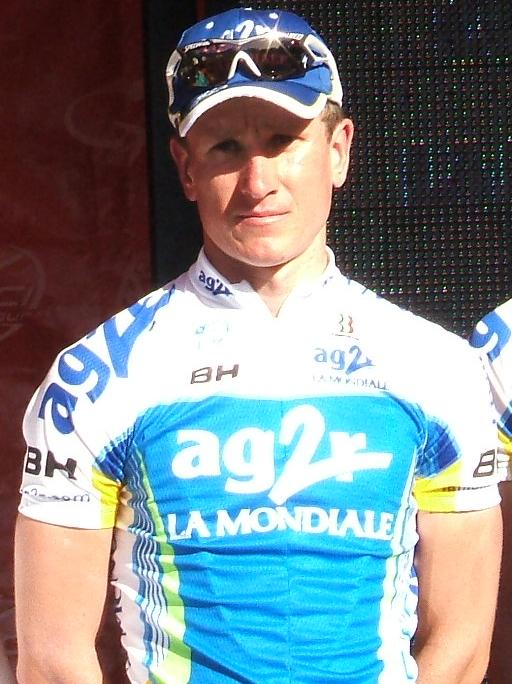
Alexander Efimkin

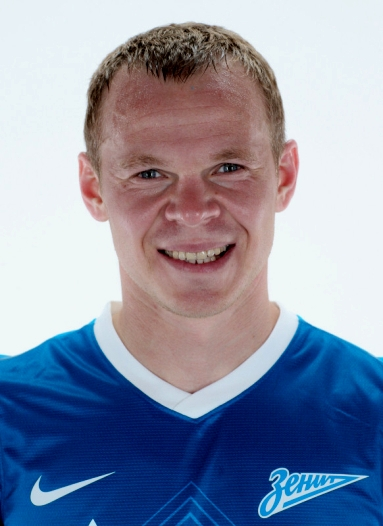
Aleksandr Anyukov

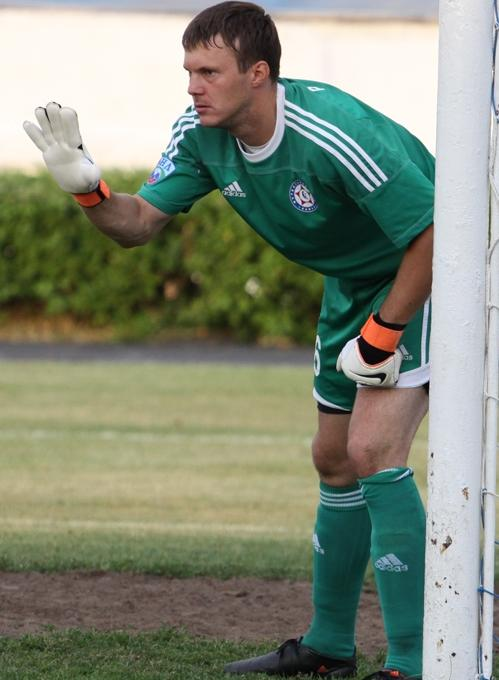
Denis Vavilin

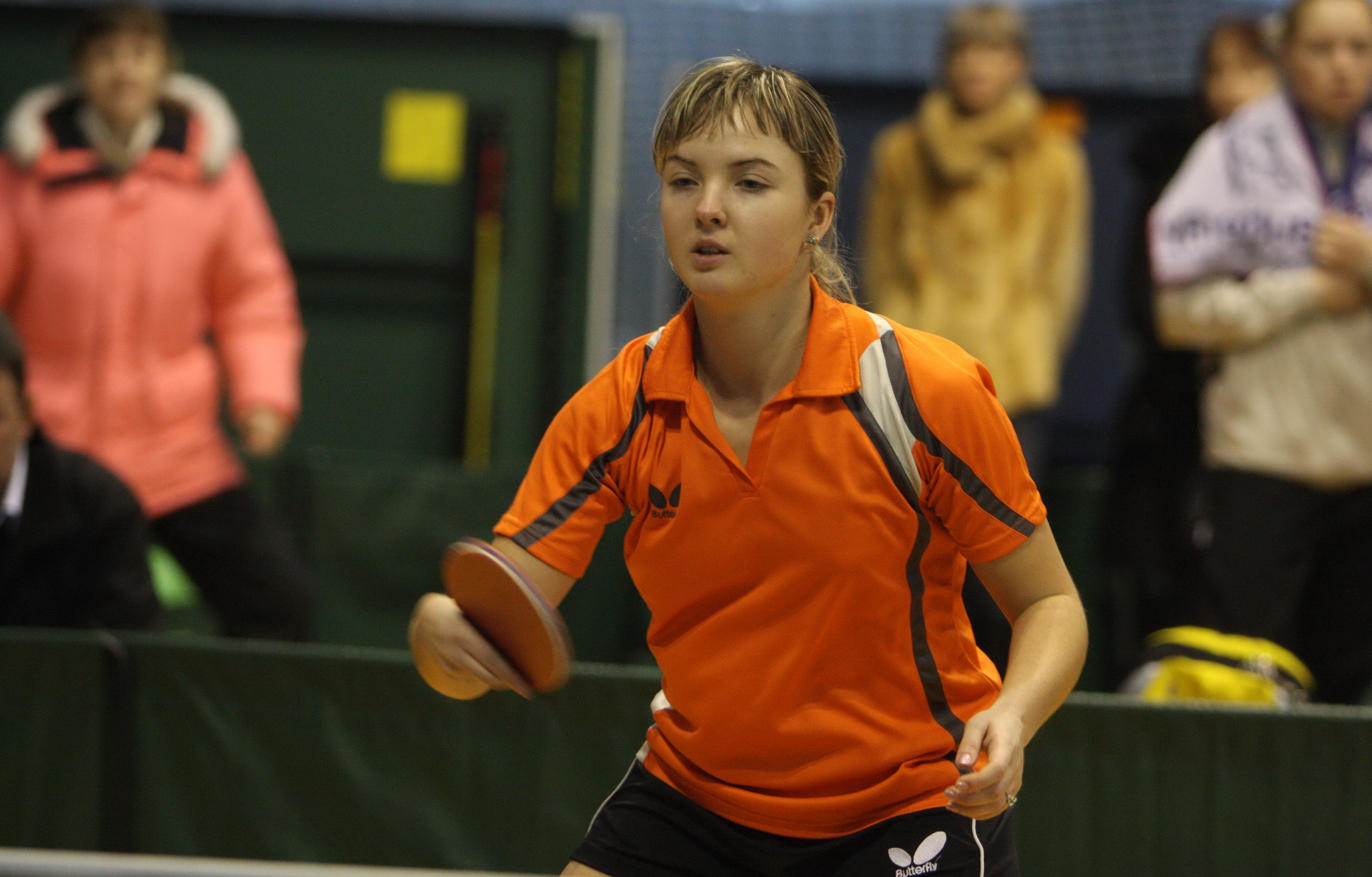
Anna Tikhomirova

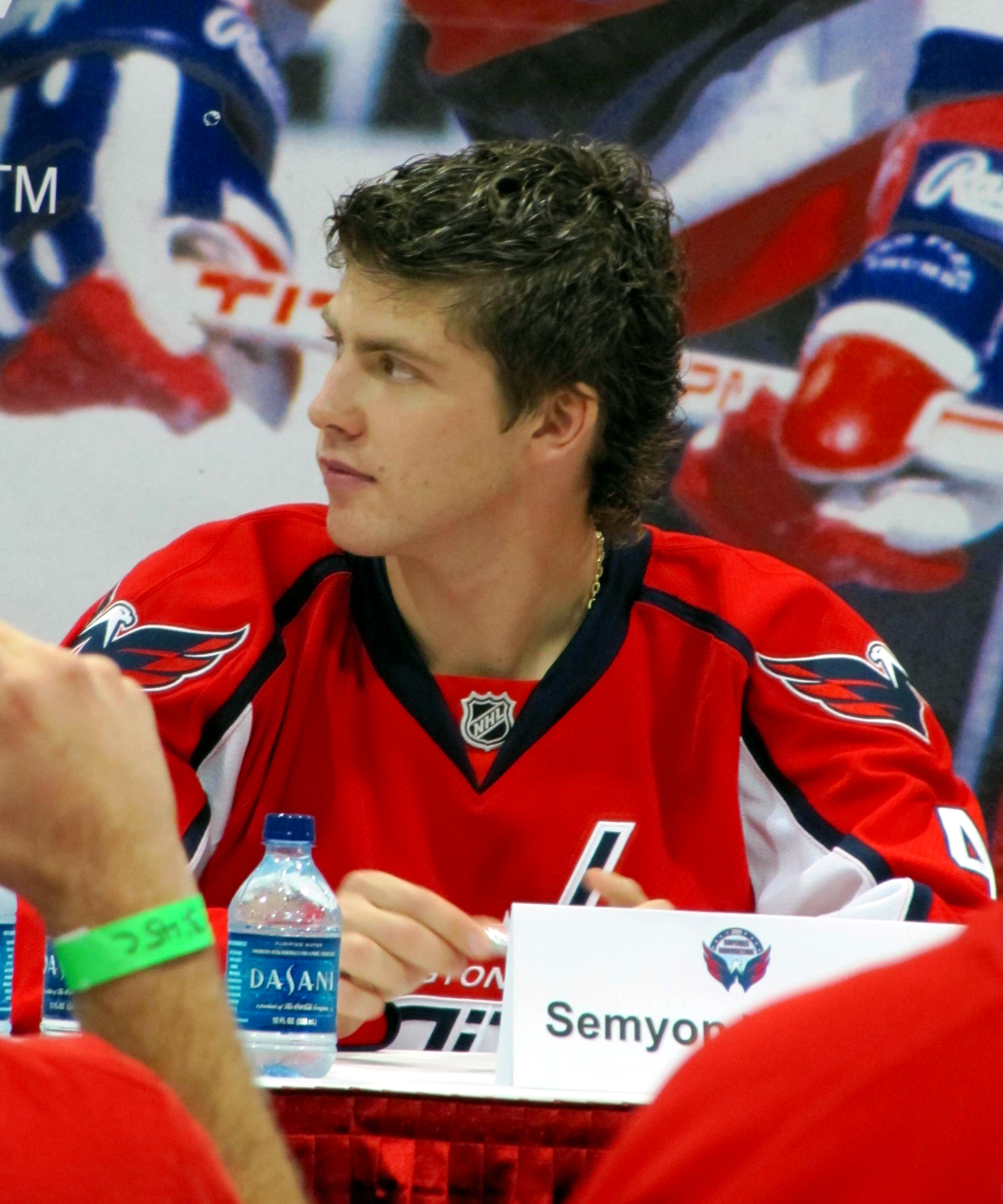
Semyon Varlamov

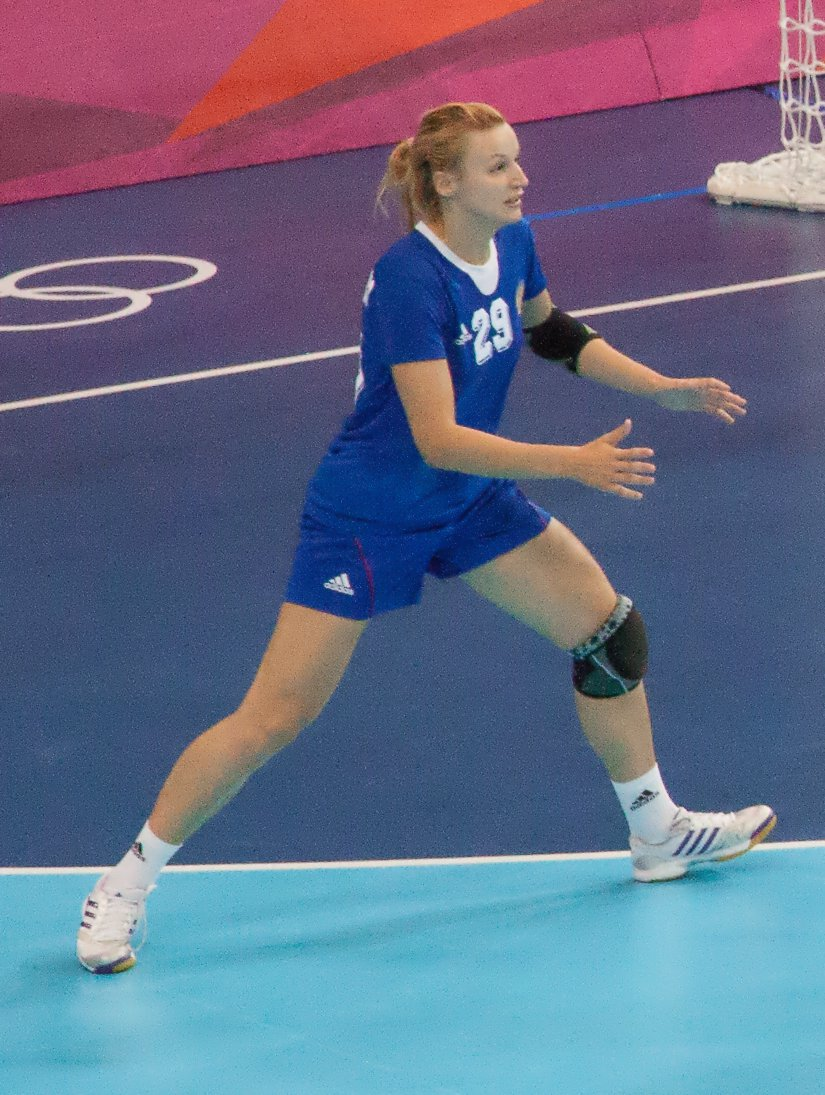
Olga Chernoivanenko

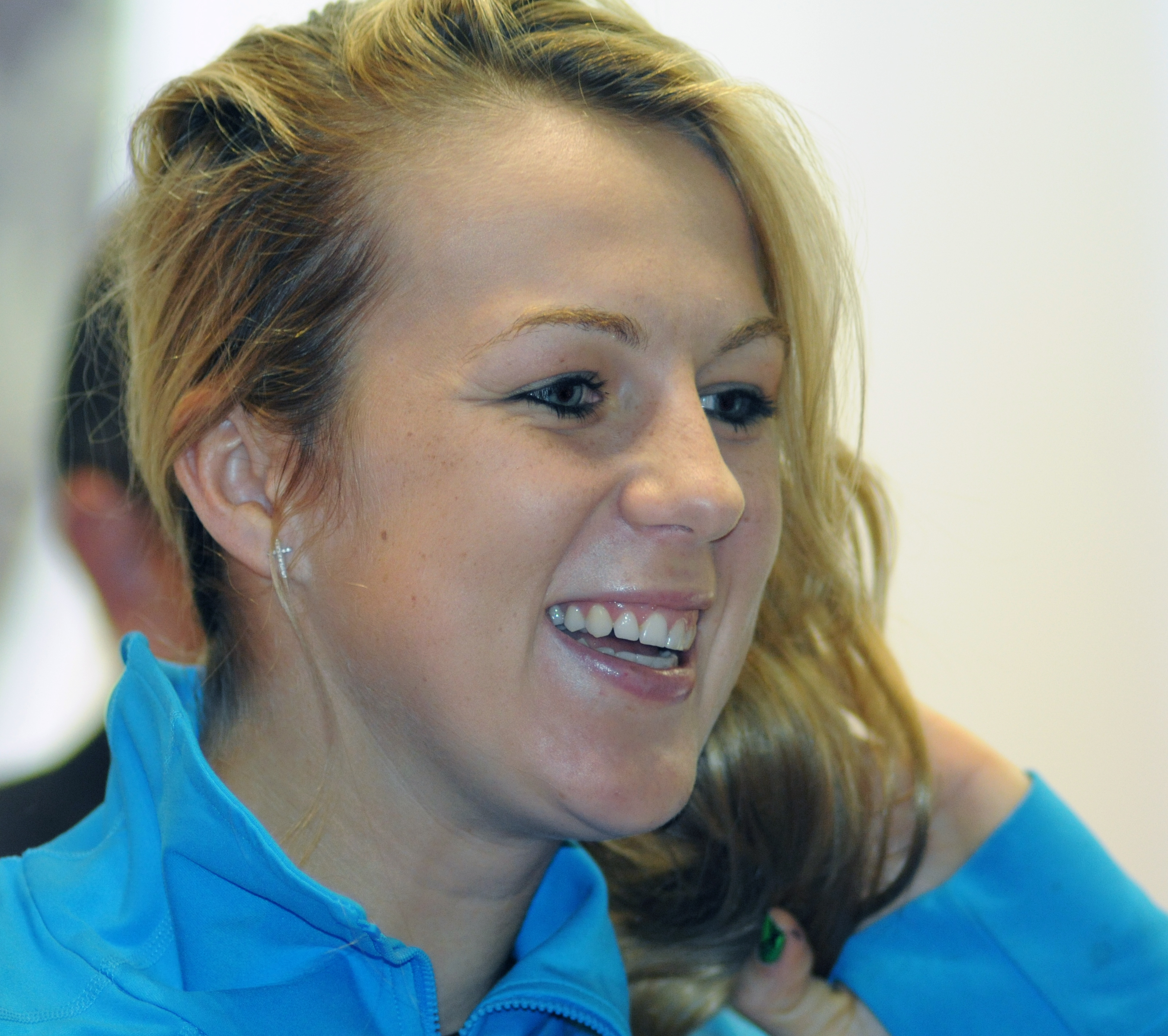
Anastasia Pavlyuchenkova

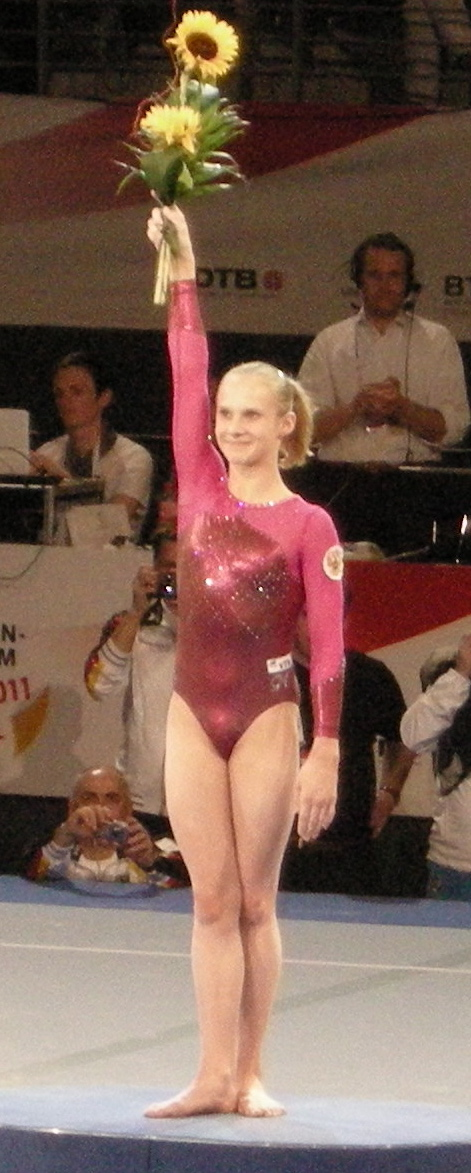
Anna Dementyeva

== Born in Samara ==
=== 19th century ===
==== 1801–1900 ====
- Nikolai Karonin-Petropavlovsky (1853–1892), Russian writer, essayist and political activist
- David Toews (1870–1947), founding chairman of the Canadian Mennonite Board of Colonization
- Gleb Krzhizhanovsky (1872–1959), Soviet economist and a state figure
- Victor Palmov (1888–1929), Russian-Ukrainian painter and avant-garde artist
- Leonid Serebryakov (1890–1937), Russian politician and Bolshevik
- Boris Kuftin (1892–1953), Soviet archaeologist and ethnographer
- Maria Kuncewiczowa (1895–1989), Polish writer and novelist
- Enrico Rastelli (1896–1931), Italian juggler, acrobat and performer
- Gregory Ratoff (1897–1960), Russian-American film director, actor and producer
- Sergei Schelkunoff (1897–1992), Russian mathematician and electromagnetism theorist
- Vasily Yefanov (1900–1978), Soviet painter

=== 20th century ===
==== 1901–1950 ====
- Nikolay Simonov (1901–1973), Soviet film and stage actor
- Andrew Alford (1904–1992), American electrical engineer and inventor
- Emma Lehmer (1906–2007), Russian mathematician
- Dmitry Ustinov (1908–1984), Russian politician, Minister of Defense of the Soviet Union from 1976 until 1984
- Lev Aronin (1920–1983), Soviet International Master of chess
- Georgy Adelson-Velsky (1922–2014), Soviet and Israeli mathematician and computer scientist
- Pavel Zhiburtovich (1925–2006), ice hockey player
- Roza Makagonova (1927–1995), Soviet actress
- Eldar Ryazanov (1927–2015), Russian film director
- Josef Gitelson (1927–2022), Soviet and Russian biophysicist
- Gennadi Poloka (1930–2014), Russian film director, cinematographer, producer and actor
- Alfred Fyodorov (1935–2001), Soviet football player and coach
- Boris Kazakov (1940–1978), Soviet football player
- Anatoli Kikin (1940–2012), Russian football player and manager
- Justas Vincas Paleckis (born 1942), Lithuanian ex-communist and politician, Member of the European Parliament
- Valentin Bogomazov (1943–2019), Russian diplomat, ambassador to Ecuador and Peru
- David Rudman (1943–2022), Soviet wrestling champion, Sambo world champion, and judo European champion
- Vladimír Železný (born 1945), media businessman and politician in the Czech Republic
- Alexander Abrosimov (1948–2011), Russian mathematician and teacher
- Valery Dudyshev (born 1948), Russian scientist
- Yakov Kazyansky (born 1948), Russian musician
- Yuri Chernov (born 1949), Soviet and Russian actor of theatre and cinema

=== 1951–1970 ===
- Lyubov Sadchikova (1951–2012), Soviet speed skater
- Ilya Mikhalchuk (born 1957), Russian politician and statesman
- Mark Solonin (born 1958), Russian historian of World War II
- Oleg Zaionchkovsky (born 1959), author
- Dmitry Muratov (born 1961), editor-in-chief of the Russian newspaper Novaya Gazeta
- Yuri Yakovich (born 1962), Russian chess Grandmaster
- Pavel Romanov (born 1964), Russian sociologist
- Asiat Saitov (born 1965), Russian cyclist
- Lev Khasis (born 1966), the first CEO of the X5 Retail Group (2006–2011)
- Alexander Ardakov, Russian professional pianist
- Pavel Galkin (born 1968), Russian sprinter, former Russian record holder at 60-metres (6,56)
- Olga Kuznetsova (born 1968), Russian sport shooter
- Olga Sharkova-Sidorova (born 1968), Russian fencer
- Aleksandr Tsygankov (born 1968), Russian professional football coach and a former player who last worked as a manager for FC Krylia Sovetov Samara
- Valeri Tumaykin (1968–1994), Russian professional footballer
- Tatyana Shishkina (born 1969), Kazakh judoka
- Tatiana Egorova (1970–2012), Russian footballer and manager

=== 1971–1980 ===
- Yuriy Andronov (born 1971), Russian race walker
- Mark Feygin (born 1971), Russian lawyer and politician
- Maria Samoroukova (born 1971), Greek former basketball player
- Alexei Tikhonov (born 1971), Russian pair skater
- Andrei Zintchenko (born 1972), Russian professional road bicycle racer
- Irina Lashko (born 1973), Russian diver
- Dmitry Alimov (born 1974), Russian entrepreneur and investor in Internet and media businesses
- Katerina Belkina (born 1974) Russian visual artist, photographer and painter
- Mariya Kiselyova (born 1974), Russian swimmer
- Igor Sinyutin (born 1974), Russian former competitive figure skater
- Sergei Korchagin (born 1975), Russian football player
- Dmitri Shoukov (born 1975), Russian footballer
- Alexei Akifiev (born 1976), Russian professional ice hockey forward
- Maxim Bakiyev (born 1977), the youngest son of former president of Kyrgyzstan, Kurmanbek Bakiyev
- Svetlana Vanyo (born 1977), Russian-American swimmer, coach and private swimming instructor, World Champion medalist, Russian national record holder and 1996 Olympics finalist
- Nina Zhivanevskaya (born 1977), Russian 5-time Olympic backstroke swimmer
- Ella Diehl (born 1978), Russian badminton player
- Julia Feldman (born 1979), Israeli jazz vocalist, composer and educator
- Aleksandr Nikulin (born 1979), Russian football player
- Alexander Ryabov (born 1979), Russian professional ice hockey player

=== 1981–1990 ===
- Alexander Efimkin (born 1981), director sportif for Russian professional cycling team RusVelo
- Vladimir Efimkin (born 1981), Russian retired professional road bicycle racer
- Aleksandr Anyukov (born 1982), Russian international association football defender
- Olga Arteshina (born 1982), Russian basketball player
- Maxim Shabalin (born 1982), Russian ice dancer
- Denis Vavilin (born 1982), Russian footballer
- Aleksandr Bukleyev (born 1984), Russian football (soccer) midfielder
- Ilia Frolov (born 1984), Russian modern pentathlete
- Nikita Osipov (born 1984), Belarusian ice hockey player
- Anna Tikhomirova (born 1984), Russian table tennis player
- Igor Shevchenko (born 1985), Russian footballer
- Anton Glazunov (born 1986), Russian professional basketball player
- Vladimir Isaichev (born 1986), Russian professional road racing cyclist
- Nataliya Kondratyeva (born 1986), Russian judoka
- Maxim Vlasov (born 1986), Russian professional boxer in the light heavyweight division
- Anna Mastyanina (born 1987), Russian sport shooter
- Andrei Myazin (born 1987), Russian professional football player
- Artyom Moskvin (born 1988), Russian football goalkeeper
- Vladislav Sesganov (born 1988), Russian figure skater
- Pavel Sukhov (born 1988), Russian fencer
- Semyon Varlamov (born 1988), Russian professional ice hockey goaltender
- Olga Chernoivanenko (born 1989), Russian handball player
- Artur Yusupov (born 1989), Russian professional footballer
- Artyom Delkin (born 1990), Russian professional football player
- Sergey Pomoshnikov (born 1990), Russian professional racing cyclist

=== 1991–2000 ===
- Anastasia Pavlyuchenkova (born 1991), Russian professional tennis player
- Anastasia Pozdeeva (born 1993), Russian footballer
- Violetta Khrapina Bida (born 1994), Olympic épée fencer
- Anna Dementyeva (born 1994), Russian artistic gymnast
- Dmitri Dragun (born 1994), Russian ice dancer
- Giorgi Gorozia (born 1995), Georgian footballer
- Andrei Lazukin (born 1997), Russian figure skater

== Lived in Samara ==
- Natalya Boyko (born 1946), Soviet sprint canoer
- Mikhail Fradkov (born 1950), Russian politician and statesman who was the Prime Minister of Russia from March 2004 to September 2007
- Sergei Marushko (born 1966), Russian professional footballer
- Vladimir Filippov (born 1968), Russian professional football coach and a former player, he made his professional debut in the Soviet First League in 1985 for FC Krylia Sovetov Kuybyshev
- Mikhail Volodin (born 1968), Russian professional footballer
- Alexander Brod (born 1969), Russian human rights activist
- Dmitri Ivanov (born 1970), Russian professional footballer
- Vladimir Miridonov (born 1970), Russian professional football coach and a former player
- Dmitri Yemelyanov (born 1972), Russian professional football coach and a former player
- Zurab Tsiklauri (born 1974), Russian professional footballer, he made his professional debut in the Russian Premier League in 1993 for FC Krylia Sovetov Samara
- Vitali Astakhov (born 1979), Russian professional footballer
- Dmitri Kostyayev (born 1989), Russian professional footballer
- Vasili Pavlov (born 1990), Russian professional football player who played for FC Krylia Sovetov Samara
- Maksim Paliyenko (born 1994), Russian professional football player who played for FC Krylia Sovetov Samara
- Olga I. Larkina (born 1954), Russian writer

== See also ==
- List of Russian people
- List of Russian-language poets
