= Artjoms =

Artjoms is a Latvian version of the common East European male given name Artyom (Russian: Артём) or Artem (Ukrainian: Арте́м, romanized: Artém), or Estonian Artjom.

The name Artjoms became popular since 1985 and extremely popular among newborn boys since 2000 in Riga.

== Notable people ==
- Artjoms Osipovs (born 1989), Latvian footballer
- Artjoms Rudņevs (born 1988), Latvian footballer

== See also ==
- Artem
- Artyom
- Artemy
- Artjom
