= Artjom =

Artjom is an Estonian transliteration of the common East European male given name Artyom (Russian: Артём) or Artem (Ukrainian: Арте́м, romanized: Artém), or Latvian Artjoms. Notable people with the name include:

- Artjom Artjunin (born 1990), Estonian footballer
- Artjom Dmitrijev (born 1988), Estonian footballer
- Artjom Gilz (born 1987), German-Russian actor
- Artjom Savitski (born 1992), Estonian singer

== See also ==
- Artem
- Artyom
- Artemy
- Artjoms
