= Artsyom =

Artsyom (Belarusian: Арцём), also transliterated as Artsiom and Artsem, is a Belarusian masculine given name. It is a version of the name Artem/Artyom. Notable people with the name include:

- Artsyom Bandarenka (born 1991), Belarusian triple jumper
- Artsyom Buloychyk (born 1992), Belarusian footballer
- Artyom Bykov (born 1992), Belarusian footballer
- Artsyom Chelyadzinski (born 1977), Belarusian footballer
- Artem Gomelko (born 1989), Belarusian footballer
- Artsyom Hancharyk (born 1980), Belarusian footballer
- Artsyom Huzik (born 1992), Belarusian footballer
- Artsem Karalek (born 1996), Belarusian handball player
- Artsyom Kosak (born 1977), Belarusian football coach
- Artsem Kozyr (born 1990), Belarusian sprint canoeist
- Artsiom Krautsou (born 1991), Belarusian martial artist
- Artsiom Machekin (born 1991), Belarusian swimmer
- Artsiom Parakhouski (born 1987), Belarusian basketball player
- Artsyom Pyatrenka (born 2000), Belarusian footballer
- Artsyom Radzkow (born 1985), Belarusian footballer
- Artsyom Rakhmanaw (born 1990), Belarusian footballer
- Artsyom Salavey (born 1990), Belarusian footballer
- Artsyom Skitaw (born 1991), Belarusian footballer
- Artsem Tsuran (born 1978), Belarusian politician
- Artsyom Vasilyew (born 1997), Belarusian footballer
- Artsyom Vaskow (born 1988), Belarusian footballer
- Artsiom Zaitsau (born 1995), Belarusian cyclist
