= Borodkin =

Borodkin (Russian: Бородкин, from бородка meaning small beard), feminine: Borodkinna, is a Russian surname. Notable people with the surname include:

- Aleksandr Borodkin (born 1971), Russian football player and coach
- Artyom Borodkin (born 1991), Russian ice hockey defenceman
- Berta Borodkina, Soviet economic criminal
- Mikhail Borodkin (1852–1919), Russian general, military lawyer and historian
