= Shulga =

Shulga (Russian: Шульга) is a gender-neutral Slavic surname. Notable people with the surname include:

- Aleksandr Shulga (born 1975), Russian football player
- Max Shulga (born 2002), Ukrainian basketball player
- Veronika Shulga (born 1981), Ukrainian footballer

== See also ==
- Shulha
