= Moskvin =

Moskvin (masculine, Russian: Москвин) or Moskvina (feminine) is a Russian surname, derived from the word Москва (Moskva, meaning Moscow). It is also a toponym that may refer to

Surname

- Anatoly Moskvin (born 1966), Russian linguist, philologist and historian
- Artyom Moskvin (born 1988), Russian football goalkeeper
- Igor Moskvin (1929–2020), Russian/Soviet figure skating coach
- Ivan Moskvin (actor) (1874–1946), Russian actor
- Ivan Moskvin (politician) (1890–1937), Soviet politician
- Kseniya Moskvina (born 1989), Russian swimmer
- Mikhail Trilisser (also known as Mikhail Aleksandrovich Moskvin; 1883–1940), Soviet secret police officer
- Nataliia Moskvina (born 1988), Ukrainian trampoline gymnast
- Stanislav Moskvin (1939–2025), Soviet Olympic cyclist and Soviet/Russian cycling coach
- Tamara Moskvina (born 1941), Russian/Soviet figure skating coach
- Tatiana Moskvina (born 1973), Russian-born Belarusian judoka
- Tatyana Moskvina (1958–2022), Russian columnist, novelist, actress, radio and TV journalist and host, leading theater and film critic

Places in Russia

- Moskvin Pochinok, a village in Vologda
- Moskvina, Chelyabinsk Oblast, a village in Chelyabinsk Oblast
