= Alimov =

Alimov (masculine, Russian: Алимов) or Alimova (feminine, Russian: Алимова) is a Russian surname of Turkic origin (Uzbek, Karakalpak, Kazakh, Tatar). Notable people with the surname include:

- Artyom Alimov (born 1986), Russian footballer
- Denis Alimov (born 1979), Russian luger
- Dmitry Alimov (born 1974), Russian businessman
- Ennan Alimov (1912–1941), Crimean Tatar writer and artist
- Gulnora Alimova (born 1971), Uzbekistani pianist
- Ilyaz Alimov (born 1990), Kyrgyzstani footballer
- Rodion Alimov (born 1998), Russian badminton player
- Ulugbek Alimov (born 1989), Uzbekistani weightlifter
- Usman Alimov (1950–2021), Grand Mufti of Uzbekistan
- Atabek Alimov (born 1987), Associate professor, Karakalpak State University (Uzbekistan), www.alimov.uz

== See also ==
- 58097 Alimov, a main-belt asteroid
