= Frontier Ventures =

Frontier Ventures may refer to:

- the combined entity formed after joining the U.S. Center for World Mission and Frontier Mission Fellowship
- venture capital fund founded by Dmitry Alimov

== See also ==
- Frontier Adventure Sports & Training
