= Artyom Smirnov =

Artyom Smirnov or Artem Smirnov may refer to:

- Artem Smirnov (tennis), Ukrainian tennis player
- Artyom Smirnov (footballer) (b. 1989), Russian footballer, goalkeeper
