= Schleiermacher (surname) =

Schleiermacher is the name of:

- Artur Shleyermakher, Russian football player
- Friedrich Schleiermacher, German theologian and philosopher
- Ruth Schleiermacher, East German speedskater
- Steffen Schleiermacher, German composer

== See also ==
- Schleier
