= Garifullin =

Garifullin (Russian: Гарифуллин) is a masculine surname, its feminine counterpart is Garifullina. It may refer to

- Aida Garifullina (born 1987), Russian operatic soprano
- Artyom Garifullin (born 1990), Russian ice hockey player
- Ildar Garifullin (born 1963), Russian Nordic combined skier
- Leya Garifullina (born 2004), Russian chess player
