= Shulha =

Shulha (Ukrainian: Шульга) is a gender-neutral Ukrainian surname. Notable people with the surname include:

- Veronika Shulha (born 1981), Ukrainian football goalkeeper
- Yuriy Shulha (born 1966), Ukrainian speed skater

== See also ==
- Shulga
