= Maykhe air base =

Maykhe
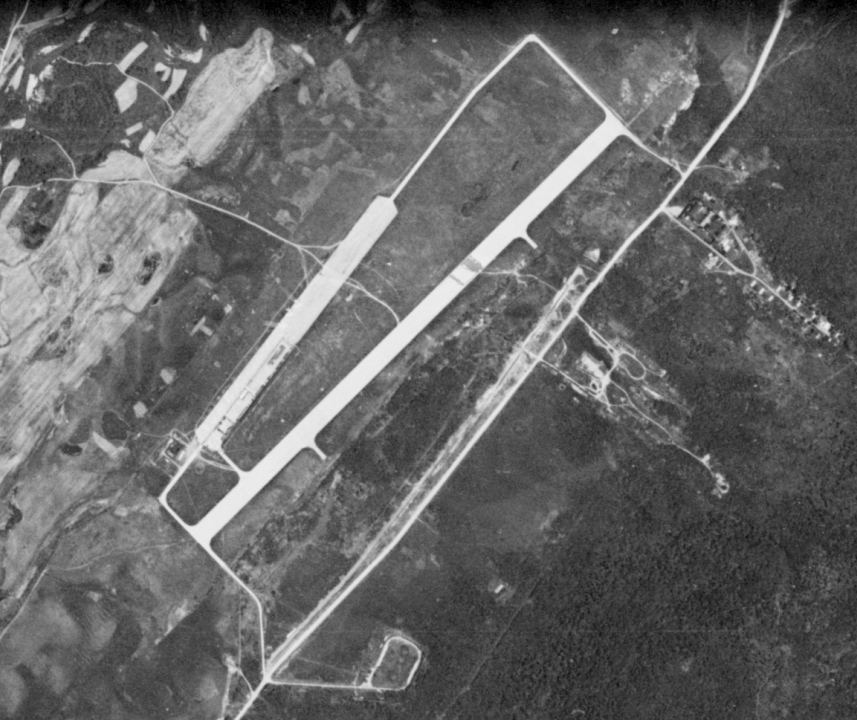
- Maykhe airfield, 1970, from KH-4B satellite.
- IATA: none; ICAO: ZA83

Summary
- Airport type: Military
- Operator: Soviet Armed Forces
- Location: Primorsky Krai, Russia
- Elevation AMSL: 225 ft / 68 m
- Coordinates: 43°25′21″N 132°25′27″E
- Interactive map of Maykhe

Runways
| Direction | Length | | Surface |
| Direction | ft | m | Surface |
|---|---|---|---|
| 04/22 | 6,560 | 2,000 | Concrete |

Maykhe (Russian: Майхэ), also given as Mayke, is an abandoned military air base of the Soviet Armed Forces in Primorsky Krai, Russia. It is located about 20 km (12 miles) east of the town of Artyom. It was identified by U.S. CORONA satellite photography as early as 1962, and in 1971 it was linked to a missile facility northeast of the airfield.

The airfield fell into disuse after the Cold War, and photo galleries on Wikimapia show auto racing events on the former runway.
