= Geghamyan =

Geghamyan (Armenian: Գեղամյան) is an Armenian surname. Notable people with the surname include:

- Arman Geghamyan (born 1981), Armenian wrestler
- Artashes Geghamyan (1949–2024), Armenian politician
- Artyom Geghamyan (born 1980), Armenian lawyer
- Levon Geghamyan (born 1977), Armenian wrestler
- Valery Geghamyan (1925–2000), Armenian-Ukrainian artist
