= Grabovoi =

Grabovoi or Grabovoy (Russian: Грабовой) is a Russian masculine surname, its feminine counterpart is Grabovaya. It may refer to the following notable people:

- Artyom Grabovoi (1983–2014), Russian serial killer
- Grigori Grabovoi (born 1963), Russian spiritual leader
