= Saratov State Academy of Law =

Higher education institute in Russia

- Саратовская государственная академия права
- Type: Public
- Established: 1931; 95 years ago
- Rector: E.V. Ilgova
- Academic staff: 590
- Students: 6,700
- Location: 104, Chernyshevskogo str., Saratov 410056, Saratov, Saratov Oblast, Russia; 51°31′34″N 46°01′16″E
- Website: www.sgap.ru

Saratov State Academy of Law (Russian: Саратовская государственная юридическая академия) is a Federal State Educational Institution of Higher Professional Education in the Saratov region of the Russian Federation.

The Saratov State Academy of Law was founded in 1931 as the Saratov Institute of Law. The academy was named in honor of Soviet Ukrainian statesman and jurist Dmitry Kursky. In 1995 the Saratov Institute of Law was transformed into Saratov State Academy of Law.

The academy has 19 faculties and 32 departments. It has eight academic buildings, the largest scientific and legal library, postgraduate and doctoral programs, and four dissertation councils. It enrolls 6,700 students, and has a staff of 590 educators.

== Notable alumni ==
- Ratmir Aybazov (born 1955), politician
- Rinat Ayupov (born 1974), political figure
- Artyom Bichayev (born 1990), political figure
- Nikolai Bondarenko (born 1985), politician and blogger
- Boris Ebzeyev (born 1950), politician and judge
- Sergey Kabyshev (born 1963), political figure
- Konstantin Lokhanov (born 1998), junior world champion and Olympic sabre fencer living in the United States
- Vyacheslav Maltsev (born 1964), politician
- Natalia Pogonina (born 1985), chess player, Woman Grandmaster, two-time Russian Women's Champion
