= Aleksandr Shulga =

Russian footballer

Personal information
- Full name: Aleksandr Grigoryevich Shulga
- Date of birth: 30 September 1975 (age 51)
- Height: 1.90 m (6 ft 3 in)
- Position: Goalkeeper

Team information
- Current team: Akron Tolyatti (GK coach)

Senior career*
Years	Team	Apps	(Gls)
1994–1996	Impuls-NTTs Tolyatti		
1996–1997	Lada-Tolyatti	1	(0)
2003–2005	NTTs Tolyatti		

Managerial career
- 2020–2021: Metallurg Vidnoye (assistant)
- 2022–2023: Konoplyov football academy
- 2023–2024: Akron-2 Tolyatti (GK coach)
- 2024–: Akron Tolyatti (GK coach)
- * Club domestic league appearances and goals

Aleksandr Grigoryevich Shulga (Russian: Александр Григорьевич Шульга; born 30 September 1975) is a Russian football coach and a former player. He is the goalkeepers coach with Akron Tolyatti.

== Career ==
In the only Russian Premier League game he ever played on 25 October 1996 he came on as a half-time substitute for Mikhail Volodin. Then he was sent off in 70th minute, so midfielder Maksim Demenko had to play goalkeeper for the rest of the game.
