= Sergey Kabyshev =

Russian politician (born 1963)

Sergey Kabyshev MP
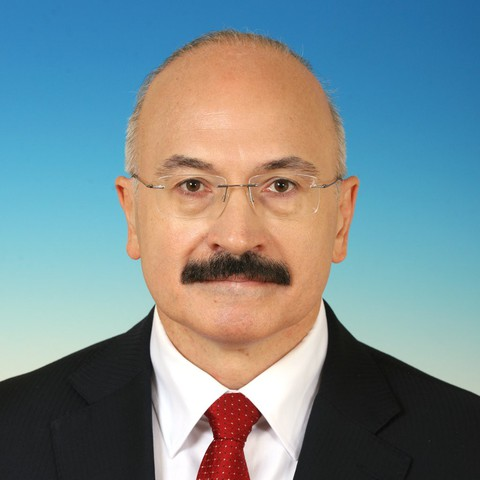

Chairman of the State Duma committee on science and higher education
- Incumbent
- Assumed office 12 October 2021
- Preceded by: position has been established

Deputy of the State Duma Russia
- Incumbent
- Assumed office 19 September 2021
- Constituency: Moscow

Personal details
- Born: 4 September 1963 (age 62) Saratov, RSFSR, USSR
- Party: A Just Russia — For Truth
- Education: Saratov Law Institute (J.D.)

Sergey Vladimirovich Kabyshev (Russian: Сергей Владимирович Кабышев; born 4 September 1963, Saratov) is a Russian political. Chairman of the State Duma Russia committee on science and higher education from 12 October 2021.

Deputy of the 8th State Duma.

== Biografy ==
After graduating from the Saratov State Academy of Law, Kabyshev served in the prosecutor's office as an assistant to the Volgograd prosecutor and an investigator in the military prosecutor's office of the Volgograd garrison.

Later he started teaching at the Higher Investigative School of the Ministry of Internal Affairs of the USSR, Volgograd State University, Higher School of Economics.

In 1998, he became a professor at the Kutafin Moscow State Law University.

Since September 2021, he has served as deputy of the 8th State Duma.

== Sanctions ==
He was sanctioned by the UK government in 2022 in relation to the Russo-Ukrainian War.
