= Artur Shleyermakher =

Russian footballer

Personal information
- Full name: Artur Viktorovich Shleyermakher
- Date of birth: 29 December 1997 (age 28)
- Place of birth: Omsk, Russia
- Height: 1.72 m (5 ft 7 1/2 in)
- Position: Midfielder

Youth career
- FC Dynamo-Yunior Omsk
- FC Irtysh Omsk

Senior career*
| Years | Team | Apps | (Gls) |
| 2016–2017 | FC Irtysh Omsk | 12 | (2) |
| 2017–2018 | FC Mordovia Saransk | 13 | (0) |
| 2018–2026 | FC Irtysh Omsk | 181 | (18) |
- * Club domestic league appearances and goals as of 13 June 2026

Artur Viktorovich Shleyermakher (Russian: Артур Викторович Шлеермахер; born 29 December 1997) is a Russian football player.

== Club career ==
Shleyermakher made his debut in the Russian Football National League for FC Irtysh Omsk on 1 August 2020 in a game against FC Yenisey Krasnoyarsk, he substituted Artyom Tretyakov in the 56th minute.
