= Artem =

- Pronunciation: English: /ɑːrˈtɛm/ Ukrainian: [ɐrˈtɛm]
- Gender: Male

Origin
- Origin: Greek

Other names
- Related names: Artyom, Ardem

Artem (Ukrainian: Арте́м, romanized: Artém, pronounced [ɐrˈtɛm]) is a male given name of Greek origin, deriving from Ἀρτέμιος (Artémios) meaning “consecrated to Artemis", the goddess of hunting. The name is especially common in Ukraine and Russia, and is also used in Armenian with the variant of Ardem in Western Armenian.

Artyom (Артём), the Russian version of the name, is often romanized as Artem although the letter "ё" gives a [-tʲɵm] ending sound.

Artem may refer to:

- Artem Anisimov, Russian ice hockey player
- Artem Bobukh, Ukrainian association football player
- Artem Borodulin, Russian figure skater
- Artem Bulyansky, Russian ice hockey player
- Artem Butenin, Ukrainian association football player
- Artem Chigvintsev, Russian-American dancer
- Artem Dolgopyat, Israeli artistic gymnast
- Artem Dovbyk, Ukrainian professional association footballer
- Artem Dzyuba, Russian professional footballer
- Artem Fedetskyi, Ukrainian association football player
- Artem Fedorchenko, Ukrainian association football player
- Artem Gomelko, Belarusian association football player
- Artem Grigoriev, Russian figure skater
- Artyom Khadjibekov, Russian sport shooter
- Artem Kasyanov, Ukrainian association football player
- Artem Knyazev, Uzbekistani pairs skater
- Artem Kononuk, Russian sprint canoer
- Artem Kontsevoy (disambiguation), multiple people
- Artem Kopot, Russian ice hockey player
- Artem Kravets, Ukrainian association football player
- Artem Kotenko, Ukrainian child singer
- Artem Laguta, Russian speedway racer
- Artemi Lakiza, Kazakhstani ice hockey player
- Artem Levin, Russian Muay Thai kickboxer
- Artem Lobov, Russian mixed martial artist
- Artem Markelov, Russian racing driver
- Artem Mikoyan, Soviet Armenian aircraft designer
- Artem Milevskyi, Ukrainian association football player
- Artem Mytarev, Russian taekwondo practitioner
- Alfred Nakache, French swimmer known as Artem
- Artem Ohandjanian, Austrian-Armenian historian
- Artem Oliinyk, Ukrainian para swimmer
- Artem Ovcharenko, Russian ballet dancer
- Ardem Patapoutian, Armenian American molecular biologist, neuroscientist and Nobel laureate
- Artem Pyvovarov, Ukrainian singer
- Artem Putivtsev, Ukrainian association football player
- Artem Semenenko, Ukrainian association football player
- Artem Severiukhin, Russian racing driver
- Artem Shlaine, Russian ice hockey player
- Artyom Ternavsky, Russian ice hockey player
- Artem Teryan, Armenian sport wrestler
- Artem Tetenko, Ukrainian association football player
- Artem Tsoglin, Israeli pair skater
- Artem Vaulin, Ukrainian man believed to have operated the original KickassTorrents website
- Artem Vodyakov, Russian speedway rider
- Artem Voronin, Russian ice hockey player
- Artem Yarchuk, Russian ice hockey player
- Artem Yashkin, Ukrainian association football player
- Artyom Yusupov, Bukharian Doctor of Audiology
- Artem Zabelin, Russian basketball player
- Artem Zasyadvovk, Ukrainian association football player
- Artem Zhmurko, Russian cross country skier
