= Artiom =

Moldovan masculine given name

Artiom is a Moldovan masculine given name and a variant of the Russian given name Artyom. Notable individuals with the name include:

- Artiom Arshanski, full name of Tommy Arshansky (born 1991), Israeli judoka
- Artiom Deleanu (born 1999), Moldovan wrestler
- Artiom Gaiduchevici (born 1987), Moldovan footballer
- Artiom Kiouregkian (born 1976), Armenian-Greek wrestler
- Artiom Litveacov (born 1996), Moldovan footballer
- Artiom Livadari (born 2001), Moldovan martial artist
- Artiom Pipa (born 1992), Moldovan weightlifter
- Artiom Puntus (born 1995), Moldovan footballer
- Artiom Rozgoniuc (born 1995), Moldovan footballer
- Artiom Samsonkin (born 1989), Belarusian-Canadian chess player
- Artiom Tsepotan (born 1978), Ukrainian chess player
- Artiom Zabun (born 1996), Moldovan footballer
