= Artyom Zagrebin =

Russian footballer

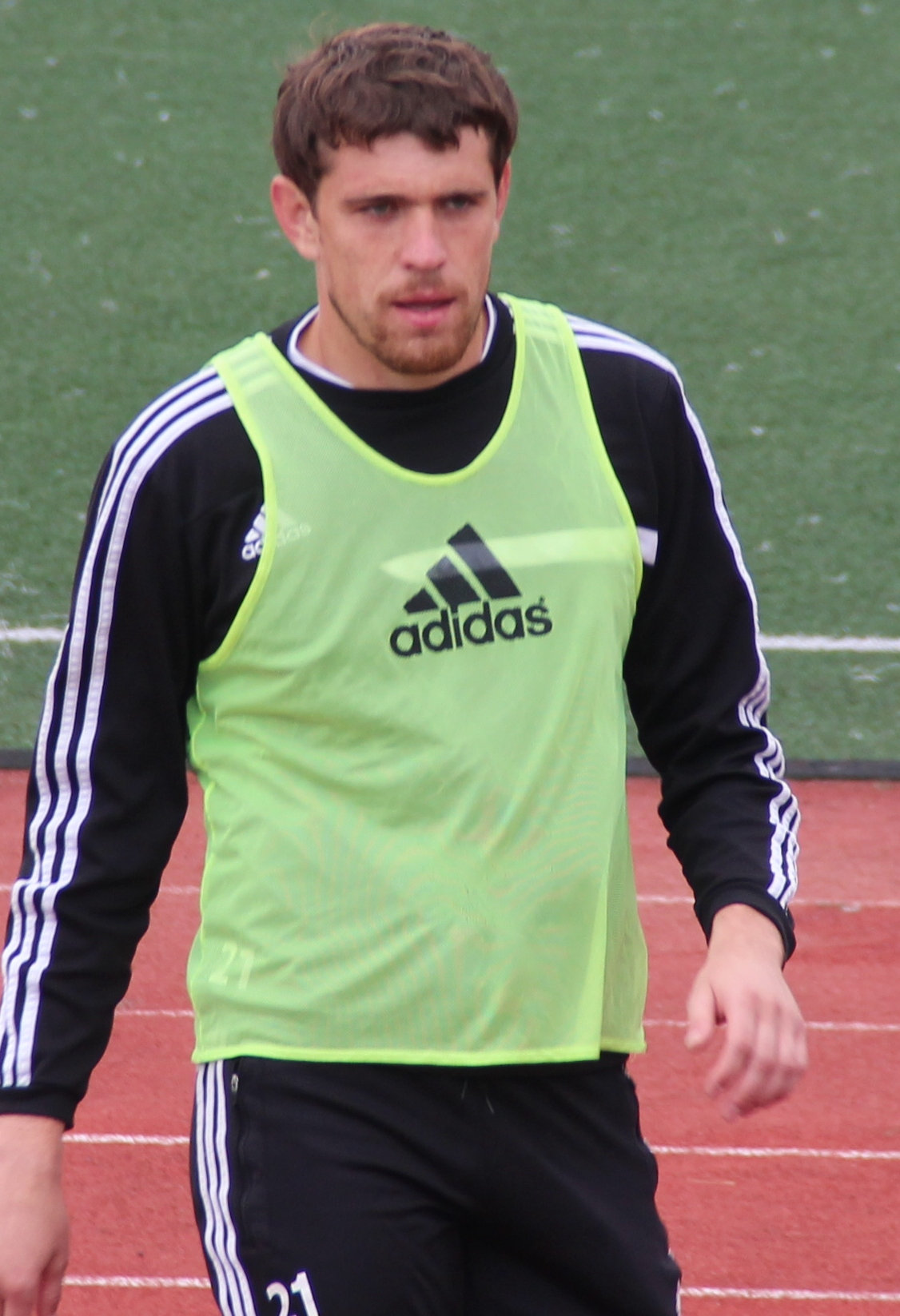

Personal information
- Full name: Artyom Aleksandrovich Zagrebin
- Date of birth: 15 August 1988 (age 38)
- Place of birth: Dzerzhinsk, Russian SFSR
- Height: 1.90 m (6 ft 3 in)
- Position: Goalkeeper

Senior career*
Years	Team	Apps	(Gls)
2006–2007	FC Khimik Dzerzhinsk (amateur)		
2008–2014	FC Khimik Dzerzhinsk	52	(0)
2014–2015	FC Tambov	16	(0)
2015	FC Khimik Dzerzhinsk	14	(0)
2016	FC Zenit Penza	7	(0)
2017–2020	FC Luki-Energiya Velikiye Luki	33	(0)
- * Club domestic league appearances and goals

Artyom Aleksandrovich Zagrebin (Russian: Артём Александрович Загребин; born 15 August 1988) is a Russian former professional football player.

== Club career ==
He made his Russian Football National League debut for FC Khimik Dzerzhinsk on 27 October 2013 in a game against FC Luch-Energiya Vladivostok.
