= Mikhail Borodkin =

Russian general and historian (1852–1919)

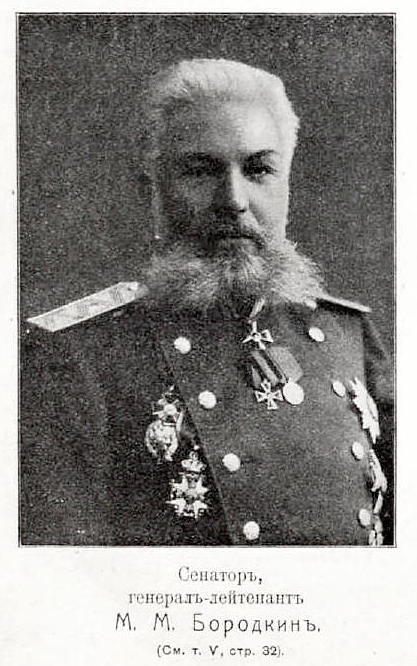
Mikhail Borodkin

Mikhail Mikhaylovich Borodkin (1852 – 1919) was Russian Empire lieutenant general, military lawyer, senator, state councilman, and historian. He is best remembered as the author of a seminal six volume history of Finland, published from 1908 to 1915.

== Biography ==
Mikhail Mikhailovich Borodkin was born in Bomarsund in 1852. Borodkin was a graduate of Alexander Military Law Academy. Assistant to the chief military prosecutor, 1909; appointed head of the Alexander Military Law Academy, 1911; Senator, 1911. Member of the State Council, 1916.

Borodkin wrote extensively on the Finnish question. He published an extensive and detailed six-volume Istoriia Finliandii (History of Finland), published from 1908 to 1915.

== Works ==
- Istoriia Finliandii (History of Finland). In six volumes. 1908–1915.
  - Peter the Great times.
  - Elizabeth Petrovna Times
  - Times of Catherine II and Paul I.
  - Time of Emperor Nicholas I
  - The Recent History of Finland. Management Time of N. I. Bobrikov
  - Volume 6. Time of Emperor Alexander II
- Finland: Its Place in the Russian State. 1911.
