= Valery Dudyshev =

Valery Dudyshev (Russian: Дудышев Валерий Дмитриевич; born July 5, 1948) is a Russian retired scientist. He was a professor at the University of Samara, Russia. He did his PhD on the topic of alternative energy.

Dudyshev was into a family of employees in Samara in 1948. He graduated in 1971 from Kuibyshev Polytechnic Institute (currently Samara State Technical University) with honors, majoring in electrical engineering.

He went on to undertake postgraduate and doctoral courses on alternative energy and electrical engineering. He wrote a thesis on "The autonomous power supply system of objects of special purpose" and proceeded to defend his PhD thesis in Saint Petersburg in 1978.

Notable publications of Dudyshev include the development of a new general electro-physical theory of natural phenomena and a patented publication on the "method for disassociating liquid" as well as other patented publications, including a patented publication on the basis of his discoveries in the physics of combustion.

In his position as head of some regional ecological programs in Russia he published diverse scientific works on ecological themes, such as the improvisation of burning processes. He worked for the Samara Institute from 1971 and retired in 2008.
