= Artyom Dorofeyev =

Russian ice hockey player

- Born: June 20, 1992 (age 34) Moscow, Russia
- Height: 6 ft 3 in (191 cm)
- Weight: 187 lb (85 kg; 13 st 5 lb)
- Position: Defence
- Shoots: Left
- KHC team Former teams: Arlan Kokshetau; Atlant Moscow Oblast
- Playing career: 2012–present

Artyom Valentinovich Dorofeyev (Russian: Артём Валентинович Дорофеев; born June 20, 1992) is a Russian professional ice hockey player. He is currently playing with Arlan Kokshetau of the Kazakhstan Hockey Championship (KHC).

Dorofeyev made his Kontinental Hockey League (KHL) debut playing with Atlant Moscow Oblast during the 2012–13 KHL season.
