= Valeri Tumaykin =

Russian footballer

Personal information
- Full name: Valeri Vladimirovich Tumaykin
- Date of birth: 6 January 1968
- Place of birth: Kuybyshev, Soviet Union
- Date of death: 13 September 1994 (aged 26)
- Place of death: Samara, Russia
- Height: 1.84 m (6 ft 1/2 in)
- Positions: Defender; midfielder

Youth career
- Mayak Kuybyshev

Senior career*
Years	Team	Apps	(Gls)
1986	FC Krylia Sovetov Kuybyshev	15	(1)
1987–1988	PFC CSKA-2 Moscow	45	(0)
1989–1994	FC Krylia Sovetov Samara	196	(4)
- * Club domestic league appearances and goals

Valeri Vladimirovich Tumaykin (Russian: Валерий Владимирович Тумайкин; 6 January 1968 – 13 September 1994) was a Russian professional footballer.

== Club career ==
Tumaykin made his professional debut in the Soviet Second League for FC Krylia Sovetov Kuybyshev on 25 April 1986. He helped Krylia Sovetov finish second in the Second League during the 1991 season, winning promotion to the Soviet Top League for the following season. He played three seasons in the Top League, appearing in 62 league matches before his death in 1994.

== Death ==
Tumaykin had accumulated significant personal debts and committed suicide at age 26 on 13 September 1994 by jumping out of the apartment window.
