= Artyom Pugolovkin =

Russian ice hockey player

- Born: 26 January 1992 (age 34) Moscow, Russia
- Height: 6 ft 0 in (183 cm)
- Weight: 165 lb (75 kg; 11 st 11 lb)
- Position: Forward
- Shoots: Right
- KHL team: KHL Medvescak
- NHL draft: Undrafted
- Playing career: 2009–present

Artyom Vladimirovich Pugolovkin (Russian: Артём Владимирович Пуголовкин; born 26 January 1992) is a Russian ice hockey player. He is currently playing with KHL Medvescak of the Kontinental Hockey League (|KHL).

Pugolovkin made his Kontinental Hockey League (KHL) debut playing with HC Spartak Moscow during the 2012–13 KHL season.
