= Vladimir Miridonov =

Russian footballer and coach

Personal information
- Full name: Vladimir Viktorovich Miridonov
- Date of birth: 5 January 1970 (age 56)
- Place of birth: Kuybyshev, Russian SFSR
- Height: 1.70 m (5 ft 7 in)
- Positions: Defender; midfielder

Youth career
- Voskhod Kuybyshev

Senior career*
Years	Team	Apps	(Gls)
1988	FC Krylia Sovetov Kuybyshev	29	(0)
1989	FC Chayka-CSKA Moscow	22	(1)
1990	PFC CSKA-2 Moscow	27	(1)
1991–1994	FC Krylia Sovetov Samara	95	(3)
1995–1996	FC Lada Dimitrovgrad	28	(0)
1997	FC Energiya Ulyanovsk	23	(0)

Managerial career
- 2008: FC RossKat Neftegorsk
- * Club domestic league appearances and goals

Vladimir Viktorovich Miridonov (Russian: Владимир Викторович Миридонов; born 5 January 1970) is a Russian professional football coach and a former player.

== Club career ==
He made his professional debut in the Soviet Second League in 1988 for FC Krylia Sovetov Kuybyshev.

== Post-playing career ==
From 2000 to 2004 he worked as a referee.
