= Artyom Vasev =

Russian footballer

Personal information
- Full name: Artyom Andreyevich Vasev
- Date of birth: 30 March 1995 (age 31)
- Height: 1.83 m (6 ft 0 in)
- Position: Defender

Senior career*
Years	Team	Apps	(Gls)
2012	LFK Rubin Kazan		
2013–2014	FC Neftekhimik Nizhnekamsk	1	(0)
2014	Avangard DYuSSh-Savinovo Kazan		
- * Club domestic league appearances and goals

Artyom Andreyevich Vasev (Russian: Артём Андреевич Васев; born 30 March 1995) is a former Russian football defender.

== Club career ==
He made his debut in the Russian Football National League for FC Neftekhimik Nizhnekamsk on 7 July 2013 in a game against FC Angusht Nazran.
