= Artem Zasyadvovk =

Ukrainian footballer

Personal information
- Full name: Artem Ihorovych Zasyadvovk
- Date of birth: 20 May 1983 (age 43)
- Place of birth: Kyiv, Ukrainian SSR
- Height: 1.74 m (5 ft 9 in)
- Position: Midfielder

Youth career
- –2000: FC Dynamo Kyiv

Senior career*
Years	Team	Apps	(Gls)
1999–2000	FC Dynamo-3 Kyiv	3	(0)
2000–2002	FC Stal-2 Alchevsk	20	(0)
2003–2006	FC Shinnik Yaroslavl	7	(0)
- * Club domestic league appearances and goals

Artem Ihorovych Zasyadvovk (Ukrainian: Артем Ігорович Засядьвовк; Russian: Артём Игоревич Засядьвовк; born 20 May 1983) is a former Ukrainian professional footballer.

== Club career ==
He made his professional debut in the Ukrainian Second League in 1999 for FC Dynamo-3 Kyiv. He played 4 games in the UEFA Intertoto Cup 2004 for FC Shinnik Yaroslavl.
