= Artem Bulyansky =

Russian professional ice hockey forward

- Born: March 16, 1985 (age 40) Ufa, Russian SFSR, USSR
- Height: 6 ft 0 in (183 cm)
- Weight: 187 lb (85 kg; 13 st 5 lb)
- Position: Right wing
- Shot: Left
- Played for: Salavat Yulaev Ufa; Khimik Mytischy; HC Yugra
- Playing career: 2001–2018

Artem Mikhailovich Bulyansky (Russian: Артём Михайлович Булянский; born March 16, 1985) is a Russian former professional ice hockey forward who most notably played for HC Yugra of the Kontinental Hockey League (KHL).
