= Artyom Vesyoly =

Russian author (1899–1938)

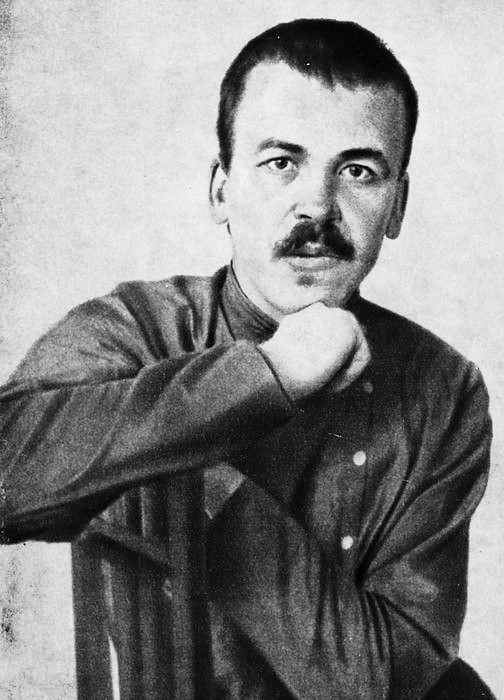
- Born: Nikolai Ivanovich Kochkurov; September 17, 1899; Samara, Samara Governorate, Russian Empire
- Died: April 8, 1938 (aged 38); Kommunarka shooting ground, Moscow, USSR
- Occupations: Writer, poet, prose writer, journalist
- Writing career
- Language: Russian
- Notable work: Russia Washed in Blood

Artyom Vesyoly (Russian: Артём Весёлый; 17 September 1899 – 8 April 1938) was the pseudonym of Nikolai Ivanovich Kochkurov, a Soviet writer and poet.

== Biography ==
He was born into a poor working family and was himself a worker at the age of fourteen.

Vesyoly became a bolshevik after the February Revolution. He joined the Red Army in the Russian Civil War and was active in the Cheka. In the early 1920s, Vesyoly studied for some time at the Institute of Literature and Moscow State University, but did not graduate. He belonged to the Pereval group of writers and, from 1929, to the All-Russian Association of Proletarian Writers.

Vesyoly as known as the early illustrator of the Russian Civil War, representing the “ornamental” prose of the Pilnyak school. His main work is a novel about the Civil War, Russia, Washed in Blood 1924–1932. The author has also written the historical novel Yermak, about his conquest of Siberia.

In the late 1930s, Vesyoly who was in the past a supporter of the United Opposition, fell victim to the Great Purge. In a private report from Nikolai Yezhov to Stalin, he claimed that Vesyoly had terrorist sentiments against the Soviet leadership.

He was arrested in October 1937 and executed on charges of involvement in the activities of a counter-revolutionary terrorist organization. His wife and three daughters were also sentenced to prison.

On April 15 of the same year, his third wife, Lyudmila Iosifovna Borisevich, was sentenced to eight years. In 1948, his first wife, Gitya Grigoryevna Lukatskaya, was repressed. In 1949, his daughters from his first marriage, Zayara and Gayra, were arrested and sentenced to five years each. In 1956, his daughters and he himself were rehabilitated. As his granddaughter Elena Govor recalled: “Even 30 and 40 years after the camp, my grandmother could not remember it without crying.”

Artyom Vesyoly and his family were rehabilitated in 1956.

For the first time, his children — Gayra, Zayara, Lev, and Fanta — were able to gather together only in 1961. Gayra and Zayara left extensive memoirs about their father and grandfather. Zayara died in 2010 and was buried at the New Donskoy Cemetery. Gayra (March 24, 1924 – December 30, 2023) continued working on the bibliography of Artyom Vesyoly until her final days.

== Gallery ==
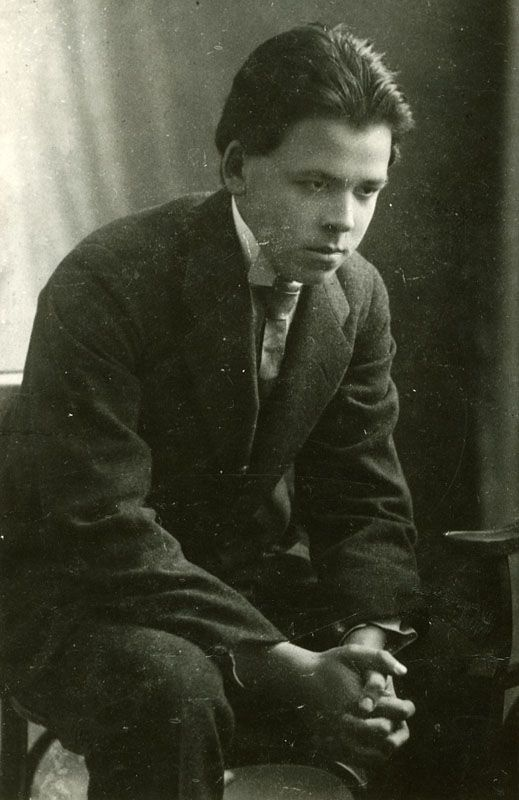
Artyom Vesyoly in 1919

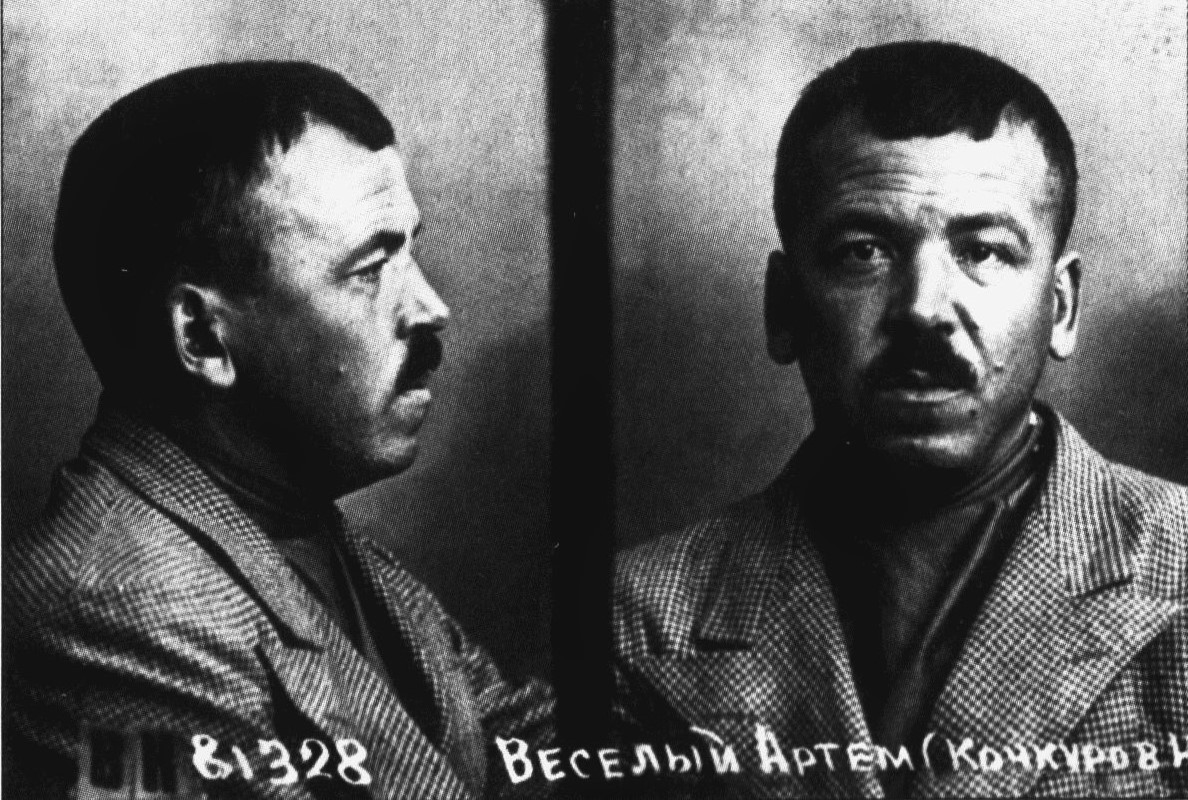
NKVD photo of Vesyoly after his arrest
