= Artemy =

Russian male given name

- Gender: Male
- Language: Greek (Russified)

Artemy (Russian: Артемий), sometimes romanized as Artemiy, Artemi, or Artemij, is a full unique form of the Russian short male Artyom. Notable individuals with the name include:

== Artemi ==
- Artemi Ayvazyan (1902–1975), Armenian-Soviet musician
- Artemi Cerdà (born 1965), Spanish scientist
- Artemi Gavezou (born 1994), Greco-Spanish rhythmic gymnast
- Artemi Gunko (born 2004), Russian footballer
- Artemi Kniazev (born 2001), Russian ice hockey player
- Artemi Lakiza (born 1987), Kazakh ice hockey player
- Artemi Maleyev (born 1991), Russian footballer
- Artemi Panarin (born 1991), Russian hockey player
- Artemi Rallo Lombarte (born 1965), Spanish lawyer
- Artemi Tchernenko (born 1978), Russian tennis player
- Artemi Ukomsky (born 1998), Russian footballer

== Artemiy ==
- Artemiy Artemiev (born 1966), Russian composer
- Artemiy Artsikhovsky (1902–1978), Soviet archaeologist
- Artemiy Sevostyanov (born 1973), Kazakh water polo player
- Artemiy Vorontsov (1748–1813), Russian senator and noble
- Artemijs Žižins (born 2006), Russian snooker player

== Artemy ==
- Abbot Artemy, 16th-century Russian abbot condemned for heresy during the reign of Ivan the Terrible
- Artemy Babinov (died after 1619), Russian explorer
- Artemy Lebedev (born 1975), Russian web designer
- Artemy Lyubovich (1880–1938), Soviet politician and Great Purge victim
- Artemy Tereshchenko (1794–1873), Russian entrepreneur and nobleman
- Artemy Troitsky (born 1955), Russian journalist
- Artemy Vedel (1767–1808), Russian composer
- Artemy Volynsky (1689–1740), Russian statesman and diplomat

== Saints ==
Saint Artemy, in the Russian Orthodox Church:

- Artemy of Verkola (1532–1545)
- Artemius (died 362)
- Artemas of Lystra

== Fictional characters ==
- Artemy Burakh, a main character of the games Pathologic and Pathologic 2.
