= Artyom Dokuchayev =

Russian footballer

Personal information
- Full name: Artyom Aleksandrovich Dokuchayev
- Date of birth: 25 April 2001 (age 25)
- Height: 1.70 m (5 ft 7 in)
- Position: Midfielder

Youth career
- FC Tyumen

Senior career*
Years	Team	Apps	(Gls)
2017–2022	FC Tyumen	38	(2)
2022–2023	FC Spartak Kostroma	14	(1)
- * Club domestic league appearances and goals as of 10 June 2023

Artyom Aleksandrovich Dokuchayev (Russian: Артём Александрович Докучаев; born 25 April 2001) is a Russian football player.

== Club career ==
He made his debut in the Russian Football National League for FC Tyumen on 13 April 2019 in a game against FC Avangard Kursk.
