= Moskvin Pochinok =

Moskvin Pochinok Москвин Починок
- Village
- Location within Vologda Oblast Location within Russia
- Coordinates: 60°26′N 45°30′E
- Country: Russia
- Region: Vologda Oblast
- District: Velikoustyugsky District
- Time zone: UTC+3:00

Moskvin Pochinok (Russian: Москвин Починок) is a rural locality (a village) in Verkhneshardengskoye Rural Settlement, Velikoustyugsky District, Vologda Oblast, Russia. The population was 6 as of 2002.

== Geography ==
Moskvin Pochinok is located 81 km southwest of Veliky Ustyug (the district's administrative centre) by road. Priluki is the nearest rural locality.
