= Artyom Sarychev =

Russian footballer

Personal information
- Full name: Artyom Andreyevich Sarychev
- Date of birth: 12 June 2000 (age 26)
- Height: 1.86 m (6 ft 1 in)
- Position: Defender

Youth career
- –2020: FC Mordovia Saransk

Senior career*
Years	Team	Apps	(Gls)
2018–2019	FC Mordovia Saransk	0	(0)
2020	FC Mordovia Saransk	2	(0)
2020–2021	FC Mordovia-MCPUFP Saransk		
2021–2022	FC Zenit Penza	25	(0)
- * Club domestic league appearances and goals as of 5 June 2022

Artyom Andreyevich Sarychev (Russian: Артём Андреевич Сарычев; born 12 June 2000) is a Russian football player.

== Club career ==
He made his debut in the Russian Football National League for FC Mordovia Saransk on 9 March 2020 in a game against FC SKA-Khabarovsk. He started and played a full match.
