= Artyom Varganov =

Russian footballer (born 2004)

Personal information
- Full name: Artyom Olegovich Varganov
- Date of birth: 6 August 2004 (age 22)
- Place of birth: Nizhniy Novgorod, Russia
- Height: 1.91 m (6 ft 3 in)
- Position: Defender

Team information
- Current team: Dnepr Mogilev
- Number: 5

Youth career
- –2016: Volga Nizhny Novgorod
- 2016–2020: SShOR No.8 Nizhny Novgorod
- 2020–2022: Chertanovo

Senior career*
Years	Team	Apps	(Gls)
2023	Kuban-Holding	1	(0)
2023–2024	Pari NN	0	(0)
2024	→ Pari NN-2	18	(1)
2025–2026	Slavia Sofia	8	(0)
2026	Kuban Krasnodar	10	(0)
2026–	Dnepr Mogilev	5	(0)
- * Club domestic league appearances and goals as of 6 September 2026

Artyom Olegovich Varganov (Russian: Артём Олегович Варганов; born 6 August 2004) is a Russian professional footballer who plays as a defender who plays for Dnepr Mogilev.

== Club career ==
He made his debut in the Russian Second League for Kuban-Holding Pavlovskaya on 7 May 2023 in a game against Chernomorets Novorossiysk.

He made his debut in the Bulgarian First League for Slavia Sofia on 19 May 2025 in a game against Lokomotiv Plovdiv.

On 11 February 2026, Varganov returned to Russia and signed with Kuban Krasnodar.
