= Artyom Fyodorov =

Russian footballer

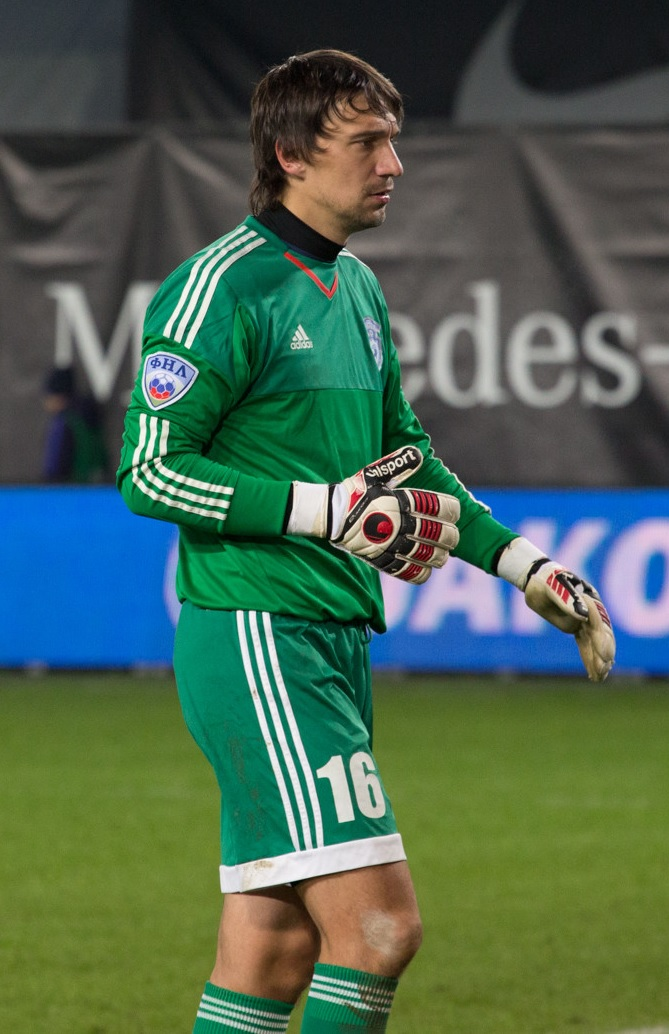
- Fyodorov with Sokol Saratov in 2016

Personal information
- Full name: Artyom Anatolyevich Fyodorov
- Date of birth: 16 December 1984 (age 41)
- Place of birth: Saratov, Russia
- Height: 1.88 m (6 ft 2 in)
- Position: Goalkeeper

Team information
- Current team: FC Sokol Saratov (assistant)

Senior career*
Years	Team	Apps	(Gls)
2004–2005	FC Zenit Penza	8	(0)
2006	FC Energetik Uren	18	(0)
2007–2017	FC Sokol Saratov	242	(0)
2017–2018	FC Fakel Voronezh	27	(0)
2018–2024	FC Sokol Saratov	116	(0)

Managerial career
- 2025–: FC Sokol Saratov (assistant)
- * Club domestic league appearances and goals

Artyom Anatolyevich Fyodorov (Russian: Артём Анатольевич Фёдоров; born 16 December 1984) is a Russian professional football coach and a former player who is an assistant coach of FC Sokol Saratov.

== Club career ==
He made his Russian Football National League debut for FC Sokol Saratov on 6 July 2014 in a game against FC Yenisey Krasnoyarsk.
