= Artemi Cerdà =

Spanish scientist

Artemi Cerda
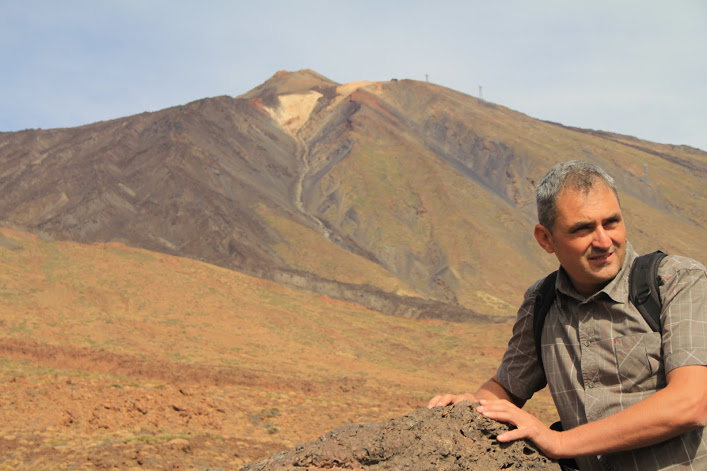
- Born: 1965 (age 60–61)
- Education: University of Valencia
- Scientific career
- Workplaces: University of Valencia

Artemio Cerdá Bolinches (born 1965) is a Spanish physical geographer and environmentalist whose work focuses on soil erosion, land degradation, hydrology and desertification in Mediterranean and semi-arid environments. He is professor of Physical Geography at the University of Valencia.

== Education ==
Cerdá completed his undergraduate degree in geography at the University of Valencia in 1989. He obtained his PhD in Physical Geography in 1993, also at the University of Valencia, with a dissertation focused on the hydrology of Mediterranean soils.

== Academic career ==
Following his doctorate, Cerdá carried out postdoctoral research between 1994 and 1996 in the Netherlands, Israel, Bolivia and the United Kingdom.

He subsequently joined the Desertification Research Center, where he worked under the direction of Patricio García Fayos. There, he developed research on the interaction between vegetation establishment, seed dynamics and soil erosion on road embankments and other artificial landforms.

In 2002, he became an associate professor at the University of Valencia. He obtained national accreditation for full professorship in 2009 and has served as Full Professor of Physical Geography at the University of Valencia since 2010. He is the founder and head of the Soil Erosion and Degradation Research Group from the Universitat de València, and founder of the International Conference on Land Degradation and Restoration and the Fire in the Earth System conference series.

== Citation-stacking investigation ==
In early 2017, a joint committee of Copernicus Publications and the European Geosciences Union (EGU) investigated allegations circulated in an anonymous document. The committee found no evidence of the alleged "citation cartel", but concluded that Cerdà, who held editorial positions at several Copernicus journals, had violated ethical rules through "citation stacking": as handling editor or reviewer, he suggested large numbers of additional references to his own work and to journals with which he was associated. The report recorded more than 600 additional references suggested across 41 manuscripts he handled as topical editor, and more than 400 across 38 manuscripts he reviewed.

Cerdà stepped down from the Copernicus journals SOIL, Solid Earth and Earth Surface Dynamics, and resigned from the editorial board of Geoderma. He initially stepped down temporarily from Land Degradation & Development, where he was editor-in-chief; after an investigation conducted in line with COPE principles, the publisher Wiley found evidence of citation irregularities and asked him to resign permanently.

A 2018 editorial by the editors of Geoderma reported that 13 articles had been published with a total of 83 references the journal considered unwarranted, and that in 75 of these the reviewer was either a co-author of the cited work or an editor of the journal in which it appeared. The editors stated that he would not be considered as a reviewer, author or editor for the journal for the foreseeable future, and only once they were satisfied that the misconduct would not recur.

Cerdà denied manipulating citations, stating that he had suggested authors read, rather than cite, additional papers.

In April 2025, International Soil and Water Conservation Research, copublished by Elsevier and China Science Publishing & Media, appointed Cerdà to its editorial board. Elsevier defended the decision, stating that researchers should not be excluded indefinitely for past actions and that a monitoring plan was in place; the journal said he would not take final decisions on manuscripts.

== Research ==
His research focuses on soil erosion, runoff generation and land degradation in Mediterranean and semi-arid environments. His work combines long-term field monitoring with rainfall simulation experiments to analyse soil detachment, surface sealing, infiltration decline and sediment connectivity across agricultural, forest and post-fire landscapes.

A central contribution of his scholarship is the demonstration of how climate gradients and land management practices interact to control erosion dynamics at plot, hillslope and catchment scales. His studies integrate that intensive tillage, herbicide use and vegetation removal significantly increase runoff, soil compaction and long-term soil losses in Mediterranean orchards and vineyards, including olive, citrus and fruit-tree agrosystems.
