= Artyom Krikunov =

Kazakhstani speed skater

Personal information
- Nationality: Kazakhstan
- Born: 7 September 1996 (age 29)

Sport
- Sport: Speed skating

Artyom Krikunov (Артём Павлович Крикунов, born 7 September 1996) is a Kazakhstani speed skater who competes internationally.

He participated at the 2018 Winter Olympics.
