= Artyom Kulikov =

Russian footballer and manager

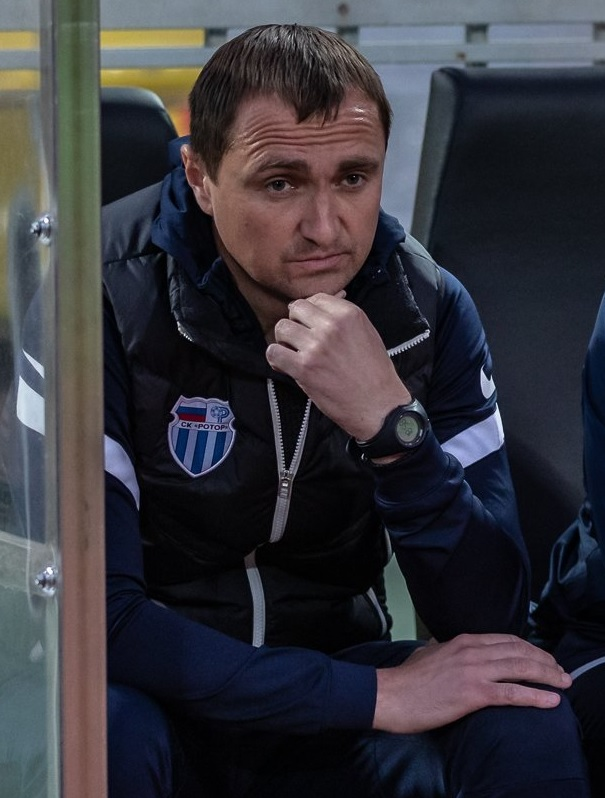
- Kulikov coaching Rotor Volgograd in 2022

Personal information
- Full name: Artyom Anatolyevich Kulikov
- Date of birth: 30 January 1980 (age 46)
- Place of birth: Astrakhan, Russian SFSR
- Height: 1.82 m (6 ft 0 in)
- Position: Forward

Team information
- Current team: BATE Borisov (caretaker manager)

Senior career*
Years	Team	Apps	(Gls)
1996–1997	Volgar-Gazprom Astrakhan	6	(0)
1998–1999	CSKA-d Moscow	28	(3)
1999–2000	Volgar-Gazprom Astrakhan	35	(3)
2001	Oryol	37	(8)
2002–2006	KAMAZ Naberezhnye Chelny	139	(15)
2007	Volga Nizhny Novgorod	10	(1)
2008	Krasnodar	12	(4)

Managerial career
- 2012–2013: Energiya Volzhsky
- 2013–2014: Olimpia Volgograd
- 2014–2015: MITOS Novocherkassk
- 2017: Zenit Penza
- 2019: Krasnodar (U20 assistant)
- 2019–2021: Krasnodar-2
- 2021: Veles Moscow
- 2021–2022: Rotor Volgograd
- 2022: Saturn Ramenskoye
- 2022–2023: Veles Moscow
- 2023–2024: Astrakhan
- 2025: Saturn Ramenskoye (assistant)
- 2025: Saturn Ramenskoye
- 2025: Saturn Ramenskoye (assistant)
- 2025–2026: Saturn Ramenskoye
- 2026–: BATE Borisov (assistant)
- 2026–: BATE Borisov (caretaker)
- * Club domestic league appearances and goals

Artyom Anatolyevich Kulikov (Russian: Артём Анатольевич Куликов; born 31 January 1980) is a Russian football manager and a former player who is the caretaker manager of Belarusian club BATE Borisov.

== Coaching career ==
On 31 October 2019, Kulikov was appointed head coach of Krasnodar-2 in the Russian Football National League.

On 29 May 2021, he was hired by Veles Moscow. He left Veles by mutual consent on 29 November 2021.

On 6 December 2021, Kulikov signed with Rotor Volgograd.
