= Artyom Stepanov =

Ukraine footballer

Personal information
- Full name: Artyom Nikolayevich Stepanov
- Date of birth: 5 May 1988 (age 38)
- Place of birth: Almaty, Kazakh SSR
- Height: 1.82 m (5 ft 11 1/2 in)
- Position: Goalkeeper

Youth career
- PFC CSKA Moscow

Senior career*
Years	Team	Apps	(Gls)
2006	FC Nika Moscow	9	(0)
2007	FC Anzhi Makhachkala	0	(0)
2008	FC Saturn-2 Moscow Oblast	14	(0)
2009	FC Anzhi Makhachkala	0	(0)
2009–2010	FC Lokomotiv-2 Moscow	7	(0)
2011	FC Zenit Moscow		
2012	FC Mostovik-Primorye Ussuriysk	0	(0)
2012	FC Zenit Moscow		
2013–2014	FC Istra (amateur)		
2017	FC Istra (amateur)		
- * Club domestic league appearances and goals

Artyom Nikolayevich Stepanov (Russian: Артём Николаевич Степанов; born 5 May 1988) is a former Russian professional footballer.

== Club career ==
He made his debut for FC Anzhi Makhachkala on 13 June 2007 in the Russian Cup game against FC Rotor Volgograd.
