= Artyom Prokhorov =

Russian footballer

Personal information
- Full name: Artyom Viktorovich Prokhorov
- Date of birth: 10 May 1989 (age 37)
- Height: 1.85 m (6 ft 1 in)
- Position: Striker

Senior career*
Years	Team	Apps	(Gls)
2008–2010	FC Salyut Belgorod	5	(0)
- * Club domestic league appearances and goals

Artyom Viktorovich Prokhorov (Russian: Артём Викторович Прохоров; born 10 May 1989) is a former Russian professional football player.

== Club career ==
He played 3 seasons in the Russian Football National League for FC Salyut Belgorod.
