= Artem Kontsevoy =

Artem Kontsevoy may refer to:

- Artem Kontsevoy (footballer, born 1983), Belarusian football forward
- Artem Kontsevoy (footballer, born 1999), Belarusian football midfielder
