= Artyom Bichayev =

Russian politician (born 1990)

- Артём Бичаев
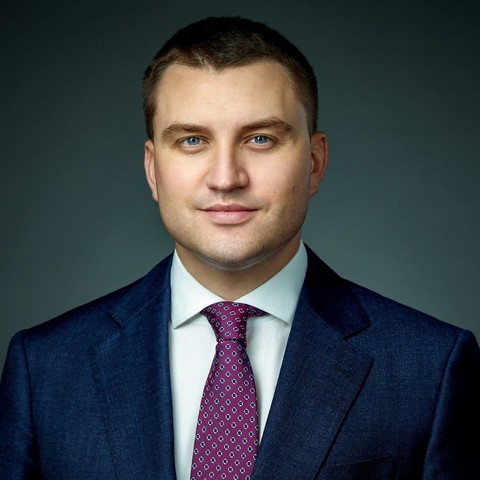

Deputy of the 8th State Duma
- Incumbent
- Assumed office 19 September 2021

Personal details
- Born: 4 April 1990 (age 36) Roslavl, Roslavlsky District, Russian SFSR, USSR
- Party: United Russia
- Education: Saratov State Academy of Law

Artyom Bichayev (Russian: Артём Александрович Бичаев; born 4 April 1990) is a Russian political figure and deputy of the 8th State Duma convocation.

While studying at the Saratov State Academy of Law, he started to be actively involved in the work of the Young Guard of United Russia. Later he was appointed deputy regional director of the organization. From 2013 to 2019, he was the head of the All-Russia People's Front's department on the work with regions.

Since 2021 he has served as deputy of the 8th State Duma.

On 24 March 2022, the United States Treasury sanctioned him in response to the 2022 Russian invasion of Ukraine.
