= Artyom Artemyev =

Russian ice hockey player

- Born: January 3, 1993 (age 32) Yaroslavl, Russia
- Height: 6 ft 0 in (183 cm)
- Weight: 192 lb (87 kg; 13 st 10 lb)
- Position: Goaltender
- Catches: Left
- KHL team Former teams: Free Agent; Severstal Cherepovets; Atlant Moscow Oblast; HC Sochi
- Playing career: 2013–present

Artyom Artemyev (born January 3, 1993) is a Russian professional ice hockey goaltender. He is currently an unrestricted free agent who most recently played with HC Sochi of the Kontinental Hockey League (KHL).

Artemyev made his Kontinental Hockey League debut playing with Severstal Cherepovets during the 2013–14 KHL season.
