= Artyom Tretyakov =

Russian footballer

Personal information
- Full name: Artyom Vladislavovich Tretyakov
- Date of birth: 2 May 1994 (age 32)
- Place of birth: Omsk, Russia
- Height: 1.79 m (5 ft 10 in)
- Position: Forward

Youth career
- FC Irtysh Omsk

Senior career*
Years	Team	Apps	(Gls)
2016	FC Tyumen	2	(0)
2017	FC Afips Afipsky	1	(0)
2017–2021	FC Irtysh Omsk	62	(2)
2021–2022	FC Tyumen	8	(2)
- * Club domestic league appearances and goals

Artyom Vladislavovich Tretyakov (Russian: Артём Владиславович Третьяков; born 2 May 1994) is a Russian former football player.

== Club career ==
He made his debut in the Russian Football National League for FC Tyumen on 11 July 2016 in a game against FC Dynamo Moscow.
