= Mikhail Volodin =

Russian footballer and coach

Personal information
- Full name: Mikhail Gennadyevich Volodin
- Date of birth: 21 September 1968 (age 58)
- Place of birth: Kuybyshev, Russian SFSR
- Height: 1.93 m (6 ft 4 in)
- Position: Goalkeeper

Team information
- Current team: PFC Krylia Sovetov Samara (U-19 asst coach)

Youth career
- Voskhod Kuybyshev

Senior career*
Years	Team	Apps	(Gls)
1985	FC Krylia Sovetov Kuybyshev	0	(0)
1988	PFC CSKA-2 Moscow	25	(0)
1989–1994	FC Krylia Sovetov Samara	66	(0)
1994	FC Tekstilshchik Kamyshin	6	(0)
1995–1996	FC Lada Togliatti	33	(0)
1997–1998	FC Chernomorets Novorossiysk	32	(0)
1999–2002	FC Lada Togliatti	88	(0)
2003	FC Kuban Krasnodar	10	(0)
2004	FC Chernomorets Novorossiysk	6	(0)
2004–2005	FC Mordovia Saransk	35	(0)
2006–2008	FC Yunit Samara	62	(0)

Managerial career
- 2008–2009: FC Rosskat Neftegorsk (director)
- 2009–2010: DFC Yunit Samara (assistant)
- 2010–2015: Konoplyov football academy
- 2015: FC Akademiya-Lada-M Primorsky (GK coach)
- 2016: FC Lada Togliatti (GK coach)
- 2021–: PFC Krylia Sovetov Samara (U-19 assistant)
- * Club domestic league appearances and goals

Mikhail Gennadyevich Volodin (Russian: Михаил Геннадьевич Володин; born 21 September 1968) is a Russian professional football coach and a former player. He is an assistant coach for the Under-19 squad of PFC Krylia Sovetov Samara.

== Club career ==
He made his professional debut in the Soviet Second League in 1988 for PFC CSKA-2 Moscow.
