= Artyom Alimov =

Russian footballer

Personal information
- Full name: Artyom Andreyevich Alimov
- Date of birth: 7 April 1986 (age 40)
- Height: 1.81 m (5 ft 11 in)
- Position: Midfielder

Senior career*
Years	Team	Apps	(Gls)
2004	FC Kuban Krasnodar	0	(0)
2005	FC Kuban Ust-Labinsk		
2006	FC Kuban Krasnodar	0	(0)
2006–2007	FC Sochi-04	40	(2)
2008	FC Volgar-Gazprom-2 Astrakhan	7	(0)
2008	FC Sochi-04	13	(0)
2009	FC Druzhba Maykop	31	(0)
2010	FC Dynamo-Biolog Novokubansk (amateur)		
2011–2012	FC Biolog-Novokubansk	16	(1)
- * Club domestic league appearances and goals

Artyom Andreyevich Alimov (Russian: Артём Андреевич Алимов; born 7 April 1986) is a former Russian professional football player.

== Club career ==
He made his debut for FC Kuban Krasnodar on 2 July 2006 in a Russian Cup game against PFC Krylia Sovetov Samara.
