= Artyom Geghamyan =

Armenian lawyer (born 1980)

- Born: 10 January 1980 (age 46); Yeghvard, Armenia
- Occupation: Chief Legal Officer in Vallex Group
- Parent(s): Yeranuhi Geghamyan; Ashot Geghamyan

Artyom Ashot Geghamyan (Armenian: Արտյոմ Աշոտի Գեղամյան; born 10 January 1980) is an Armenian lawyer. He is a graduate of Yerevan State University, Public Administration Academy, Indiana University, and Harvard University, where he specialized in public administration. On 25 July 2014 he was appointed deputy justice minister of Armenia.

== Early years and education ==
Geghamyan was born on January 10, 1980, in Yeghvard, Armenia, where he attended secondary school. As a child, he studied music and played violin. He was so serious about music that was preparing to apply to the conservatory. However, he later changed his mind and entered the law department at the Yerevan State University.

=== Education ===
- 1997-2001 Yerevan State University School of Law, Master of Law (LL.M) International Law
- 2001-2003 Yerevan State University School of Law, Bachelor's degree, JurisprudenceUpon graduating from Yerevan State University School of Law in 2001, he started his master's program in the same school in the field of International Trade Law and graduated with honor in 2003.
- 2003-2006 Public Administration Academy of the Republic of Armenia, Doctor of Philosophy (Ph.D.), European Union Law and Integration
- 2006-2007 Indiana University School of Law Indianapolis, LLM, International and Comparative Law
- 2012-2013 Harvard Kennedy School of Government, Master of Public Administration (MPA), Business and Government

== Work experience ==
Geghamyan has held various roles in the legal sector throughout his career. From 2001 to 2005, he served as the Assistant Chief Justice and Head of the Registrar in the Commercial Court of Appeal. After that, he worked as a Senior Legal Counsel at America Legal and Tax Advisors from 2005 to 2006. He then became the Head of Chair for Criminal Legal Procedure at the Prosecutors' Training School from 2007 to 2008. In 2008, he took on the role of Head of Department in the Ministry of Justice of the Republic of Armenia, serving until 2009. Between 2009 and 2012, he worked as a Legal Officer at the Council of Europe, focusing on human rights and rule of law in the Directorate General. From 2013 to 2014, Geghamyan was a Research Fellow and Associate in Transitional Justice at the Carr Center for Human Rights Policy at Harvard University’s Kennedy School of Government. In 2014, he briefly served as the Deputy Minister of Justice of the Republic of Armenia. Since 2014, he has been the Chief Legal Officer at Vallex Group.

== Awards ==
- 2009 – Ministry of Justice and JS Memorial Trust John Smith Fellowship,
- 2006 – 2007 U.S. Department of State Edmund E. Muskie Fellowship Program,
- 2008 – 2010 Open Society Institute Academic Fellowship Program,
- 2008 – 2009 U.S. Department of State Public Service Fellowship,
