= Artyom Smirnov (footballer) =

Russian footballer

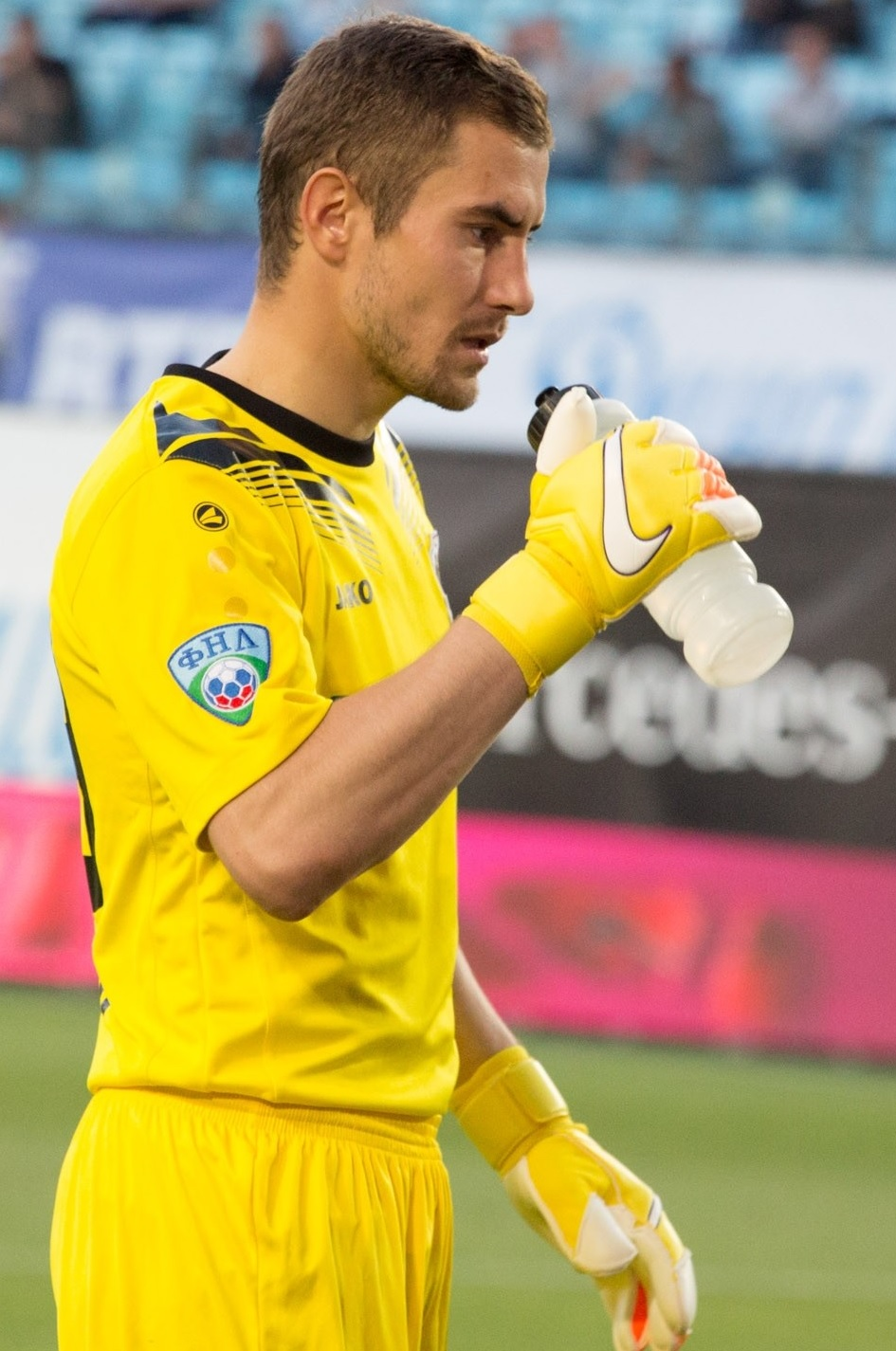
- Smirnov with Tyumen in 2016

Personal information
- Full name: Artyom Aleksandrovich Smirnov
- Date of birth: 6 January 1989 (age 37)
- Place of birth: Yaroslavl, Russian SFSR
- Height: 1.85 m (6 ft 1 in)
- Position: Goalkeeper

Youth career
- FC Shinnik Yaroslavl

Senior career*
Years	Team	Apps	(Gls)
2008–2013	FC Shinnik Yaroslavl	5	(0)
2010	→ FC Tekstilshchik Ivanovo (loan)	7	(0)
2013–2015	FC Tosno	29	(0)
2014–2015	→ FC Dynamo Saint Petersburg (loan)	5	(0)
2015–2017	FC Tyumen	43	(0)
2017–2018	FC Baltika Kaliningrad	0	(0)
2018	FC Murom	5	(0)
2020	FC Chita	4	(0)
2022–2023	FC Torpedo Vladimir	24	(0)
- * Club domestic league appearances and goals

Artyom Aleksandrovich Smirnov (Russian: Артём Александрович Смирнов; born 6 January 1989) is a Russian former professional football player.

== Club career ==
He played 4 seasons in the Russian Football National League for FC Shinnik Yaroslavl, FC Tosno, FC Dynamo Saint Petersburg and FC Tyumen.
