= Veronika Shulha =

Ukrainian footballer

Veronika Shulga
Personal information
- Full name: Veronika Shulga
- Date of birth: 24 April 1981 (age 45)
- Place of birth: Soviet Union
- Height: 1.82 m (6 ft 0 in)
- Position: Goalkeeper

Team information
- Current team: Zhytlobud-1 Kharkiv

Senior career*
Years	Team	Apps	(Gls)
1994–1998	Lehenda Chernihiv		
1999	Energiya Voronezh		
2000–2001	Ryazan-VDV		
2002	Lada Togliatti		
2003	Energiya Kislovodsk		
2004	CSK VVS Samara		
2005	Arsenal Kharkiv		
2006	Spartak Moscow		
2007–2008	Nadezhda Noginsk		
2009	Izmailovo	8	
2010	Ryazan-VDV	23	
2011–2012	Energiya Voronezh	24	
2012–2014	Ryazan-VDV	2	
2016–	Zhytlobud-1 Kharkiv		

International career
1998–2007	Ukraine		
- * Club domestic league appearances and goals as of 7 September 2012

Veronika Shulga (born April 24, 1981) is a Ukrainian football goalkeeper, currently playing in the Ukrainian Women's League for Zhytlobud-1 Kharkiv. Having started her career in the Ukrainian Championship's Lehenda Chernihiv, from 1999 she developed it mostly in Russia, also playing for Energiya Voronezh, Lada Togliatti, CSK VVS Samara, Nadezhda Noginsk and Ryazan VDV, with which she won the 2000 title.

She has been a member of the Ukrainian national team.
