= Artyom Grabovoi =

Russian serial killer

- Born: Artyom Viktorovich Grabovoi; 1983; Bolshoi Atmas, Omsk Oblast, RSFSR
- Died: February 9, 2014 (aged 30–31); Knyaze–Volkonskoye, Khabarovsk Krai, Russia
- Cause of death: Suicide by hanging
- Other name: "The Knyaze–Volkonskoye Maniac"
- Conviction: N/A
- Penalty: N/A

Details
- Victims: 3
- Span of crimes: January 1 – February 2, 2014
- Country: Russia
- State: Khabarovsk
- Date apprehended: N/A

Artyom Viktorovich Grabovoi (Russian: Артём Викторович Грабовой; 1983 – February 9, 2014), known as The Knyaze–Volkonskoye Maniac (Russian: Маньяк из Князе-Волконского), was a Russian military officer, serial killer and rapist responsible for the murders of two women and one girl in the village of Knyaze–Volkonskoye, Khabarovsk Krai between January and February 2014. He was never arrested for the crimes, as he hanged himself upon learning that he was being investigated, with his guilt definitely proven post-mortem and the case officially closed.

== Early life ==
Little is known about Grabovoi's early life. Born in 1983 in the village of Bolshoi Atmas, Omsk Oblast, he is known to have graduated the Omsk Higher Tank Engineering School, have married and had a daughter sometime during the 2010s. As part of his military duty, he was stationed at a garrison located in Knyaze–Volkonskoye, where he lived in an apartment provided by the army. Around 2013, following a heated scandal with his wife, whom Grabovoi threatened to kill with his hunting rifle, the woman left him. Following her departure, Grabovoi moved in with a female acquaintance in another part of the village, using her burgundy-colored Suzuki Grand Vitara to travel around, since she did not use it often and he himself had no means of transportation.

== Murders ==
On January 1, 2014, Grabovoi travelled to nearby Khabarovsk, where he spotted a 15-year-old girl at a bus stop. He invited her into his SUV, ostensibly to drive her to her desired destination, which was recorded on CCTV footage from a nearby surveillance camera. Two days later, the girl's partially naked body was found on a rural road, near the cemetery in Chyornaya Rechka. A forensic autopsy determined that she had died of hypothermia, but had also been raped by an unknown third party prior to her death, who likely left her to die in the cold.

About a month later, on February 2, the body of a 50-year-old woman was found in Khabarovsk's central cemetery, who evidently had been raped and then killed by a blow to the head with an axe-like tool. After relatives from her home village of Mirnoye identified her, they confirmed that the victim worked as a saleswoman in Khabarovsk and that she had gone to work early in the morning, as she usually did.

Four days later, motorists passing along a road near Chyornaya Rechka found the body of a young woman. The discovery was reported to the police, who established her identity as 23-year-old Antonina Menshina, a resident of Knyaze–Volkonskoye who was last seen in the early morning hours of February 2, leaving for work at her job in Khabarovsk. Like the previous victim, she too had been killed from a blow with an axe-like tool to the head.

== Investigation and suicide ==
By then, local investigators realized that they had a serial murderer on the loose after connecting the three cases by the perpetrator's apparent modus operandi: picking up women at bus stops in Khabarovsk, raping and then killing them before discarding their bodies on the roadside. One peculiarity that further tied the three murders together was that the perpetrator removed all rings from the victims' fingers and then placed them near their private parts. After gathering evidence from the crime scenes and interviewing any possible witnesses, investigators came to a realization: the killer was likely a soldier from the nearby garrison who only killed on weekends, as military exercises took up most of the schedule on weekdays.

Shortly after, investigators put out an identikit of the alleged offender, warning local girls and women to avoid accepting rides from strangers while travelling for work. The day after the last body's discovery, after examining the CCTV footage and testimonies from witnesses who had seen the first victim enter into the same SUV seen on said footage, investigators concluded that the likely perpetrator was Capt. Artyom Grabovoi, who was serving at the garrison in Knyaze–Volkonskoye. A search warrant was produced to examine the residence he lived in, but learning of it beforehand, Grabovoi's roommate warned him about the impending search. Grabovoi left the apartment and went back to the garrison's housing units, where he hid in an abandoned building on the outskirts of the village. About half an hour later, a group of officers broke into the building, only to find that their suspect had hanged himself.

In relation to the investigation, initial reports did not disclose his name, reiterating that he was simply a suspect in the recent murders and might have committed suicide due to depression or unemployment. After months of investigation, during which forensic experts analyzed three bloodstained jackets, traces of blood and hair in the SUV, as well as semen samples from Grabovoi, a DNA test linked all the blood and semen samples to those found on the victims' bodies. As a result, the case was officially closed and Grabovoi named the sole suspect, dispelling rumors that he had been framed or had an accomplice in his crimes.

== See also ==
- List of Russian serial killers
