= Artyom Borodkin =

Russian ice hockey player (born 1991)

- Born: October 11, 1991 (age 33); Chelyabinsk, Russian SFSR
- Height: 5 ft 11 in (180 cm)
- Weight: 176 lb (80 kg; 12 st 8 lb)
- Position: Defence
- Shoots: Left
- KHL team Former teams: Free agent Traktor Chelyabinsk; HC Vityaz; Lada Togliatti
- Playing career: 2012–present

Artyom Borodkin (born October 11, 1991) is a Russian professional ice hockey defenceman. He is currently an unrestricted free agent who most recently played with HC Lada Togliatti in the Kontinental Hockey League (KHL).

Borodkin previously played the first eight professional seasons of his career with hometown club, Traktor Chelyabinsk of the KHL. On 3 May 2020, Borodkin left Traktor to sign a one-year contract as a free agent with HC Vityaz for the 2022–23 season.
