= Artyom Garifulin =

Russian ice hockey player

- Born: October 9, 1990 (age 34); Yaroslavl, Russian SFSR
- Height: 6 ft 2 in (188 cm)
- Weight: 201 lb (91 kg; 14 st 5 lb)
- Position: Forward
- Shoots: Right
- Played for: Metallurg Novokuznetsk; Buran Voronezh; Diables Rouges de Briançon
- Playing career: 2010–present

Artyom Nikolayevich Garifulin (Russian: Артём Николаевич Гарифулин) (born October 9, 1990) is a Russian professional ice hockey player.

Garifulin made his Kontinental Hockey League debut playing with Metallurg Novokuznetsk during the 2014–15 KHL season.
