= Artyom Chelyadinsky =

Belarusian footballer (born 1977)

Personal information
- Full name: Artyom Viktorovich Chelyadinsky
- Date of birth: 29 December 1977 (age 48)
- Place of birth: Minsk, Belarusian SSR, Soviet Union
- Height: 1.88 m (6 ft 2 in)
- Position: Defender

Team information
- Current team: Minsk (manager)

Senior career*
Years	Team	Apps	(Gls)
1996–1998	Dinamo-Juni Minsk	59	(3)
1999–2002	Dinamo Minsk	76	(4)
2002–2003	Sokol Saratov	43	(1)
2004–2008	Metalurh Zaporizhzhia	111	(5)
2009	Tobol Kostanay	10	(0)
2010	Naftan Novopolotsk	32	(0)
2011	Shakhtyor Soligorsk	9	(2)
2012–2016	Torpedo-BelAZ Zhodino	97	(5)
2016	Dinamo Minsk	9	(1)
2017	Krumkachy Minsk	22	(0)

International career
1998–1999	Belarus U21	9	(0)
2002–2007	Belarus	7	(0)

Managerial career
- 2018–2021: Dinamo Minsk (reserves)
- 2021–2022: Dinamo Minsk
- 2023: Dinamo Minsk (academy coach)
- 2024–: Minsk
- * Club domestic league appearances and goals

Artyom Viktorovich Chelyadinsky (Belarusian: Арцём Віктаравіч Чалядзінскі; Russian: Артём Викторович Челядинский; born 29 December 1977) is a Belarusian former professional footballer and Belarus international.

== Early life ==
Chelyadinsky was born in Minsk. Because of his father, he took up hockey at an early age. However, after getting meningitis, he started playing football instead.

== Career ==
After spending five years with Metalurh Zaporizhya, Chelyadinsky left for Tobol Kostanay in Kazakhstan.

== Honours ==
Torpedo-BelAZ Zhodino

- Belarusian Cup: 2015–16
