= Dmitry Alimov =

American technology investor and entrepreneur

- Born: 17 August 1974 (age 51); Samara, USSR
- Education: Harvard Business School, University of Missouri–St. Louis, Samara State Aerospace University
- Occupations: entrepreneur, venture capitalist, founding partner of Frontier Ventures investment fund, co-founder of ivi.tv

Dmitry Alimov (Russian: Дмитрий Серге́евич Алимов, Dmitry Sergeyevich Alimov) (born August 17, 1974, in Samara, USSR) is an American entrepreneur and investor in technology businesses, founder and managing partner of the investment fund Frontier Ventures, and co-founder of the online video service ivi.tv. He worked as a senior manager in companies such as Access Industries, VC fund RTP Global, and Sputnik Group. In 2016 the European CEO magazine named Dmitry Alimov Entrepreneur of the Year (Venture capital).

== Biography ==
Dmitry Alimov was born in 1974 in Samara, USSR (now Russia). He studied applied mathematics and computer science at the Samara State Aerospace University. In 1998, he graduated summa cum laude from the University of Missouri–St. Louis in the United States with a major in business administration (finance).

Alimov started his career at the mergers and acquisitions department of global investment bank Renaissance Capital. From 1998 to 2002, as the vice president of a $1 billion private equity and venture capital fund Sputnik Group, he managed a number of venture capital and private equity investments.

Allimov. earned his MBA from Harvard Business School in 2004. During 2004, Leonard Blavatnik invited him to work for Access Industries (Eurasia). Alimov was in charge of the company's investment in media from 2004 to 2005. In 2005, Alimov was appointed the managing director of Amedia and developed the company to lead the market in TV production in Russia.

In 2008, Alimov left Amedia and sold his equity interest in the company to Access Industries. From 2007 to 2010, Alimov worked as the managing partner of the global venture fund RTP Global.

Alimov has backed Internet companies. He co-founded and played a role in the financing, launch, and growth of entertainment video service IVI.TV.

In 2011, Alimov founded a $50 million venture capital fund Frontier Ventures. It is an investment fund that invests in early-stage technology businesses in the United States with a particular focus on artificial intelligence companies with strong network effects. The fund was officially announced in March, 2012. Frontier Ventures' investment team is based in Silicon Valley. In 2019, Frontier Ventures launched its second fund focused on US early stage Artificial Intelligence companies.

== Dispute with Jim Rogers ==
In 2003, his widely circulated e-mail exchange with the global investor Jim Rogers made Alimov, then a student at Harvard Business School, a prominent figure among businessmen and government officials. The dispute started after Rogers’ lecture at HBS. The co-founder of the Quantum Fund described Russia as a hopeless place for investors. Alimov wrote an e-mail to Rogers claiming that his statements and facts on Russia were not well-grounded. A long-lasting e-mail exchange that followed was eventually covered by several news sources.

In 2012, guest commentator Ben Aris in the Financial Times declared Alimov the winner of this debate after Rogers changed his stance on Russia and became an advisor to the agricultural fund run by Russian state-owned bank VTB Capital.
