= Artyom Moskvin =

Russian footballer

Personal information
- Full name: Artyom Andreyevich Moskvin
- Date of birth: 7 May 1988 (age 38)
- Place of birth: Kuybyshev, Russian SFSR
- Height: 1.84 m (6 ft 0 in)
- Position: Goalkeeper

Senior career*
Years	Team	Apps	(Gls)
2003–2009	FC Krylia Sovetov Samara	46	(0)
2010	FC Avangard Kursk	10	(0)
2011–2013	FC Syzran-2003	48	(0)
2013–2015	FC Gazovik Orenburg	8	(0)
2014	→ FC KAMAZ Naberezhnye Chelny (loan)	10	(0)
2015–2016	FC KAMAZ Naberezhnye Chelny	15	(0)
2016	FC Sakhalin Yuzhno-Sakhalinsk	3	(0)
2017–2018	FC KAMAZ Naberezhnye Chelny	30	(0)
- * Club domestic league appearances and goals

Artyom Andreyevich Moskvin (Russian: Артём Андреевич Москвин; born 7 May 1988) is a Russian former football goalkeeper.

== Club career ==
He made his debut in the Russian Second Division for FC Syzran-2003 on 12 June 2011 in a game against FC Dynamo Kirov.

He played two seasons in the Russian Football National League for FC Gazovik Orenburg and FC KAMAZ Naberezhnye Chelny.
