= List of second division football clubs in UEFA countries =

UEFA countries on this map of the world's six football confederations

The Union of European Football Associations (UEFA) is the administrative and controlling body for European football. It consists of 55 member associations, each of which is responsible for governing football in their respective countries.

All widely recognised sovereign states located entirely within Europe are members, with the exceptions of the United Kingdom, Monaco, and Vatican City. Eight states partially or entirely outside Europe are also members: Armenia, Azerbaijan, Russia, Georgia, Kazakhstan, Israel, Cyprus and Turkey. The United Kingdom is divided into the four separate football associations of England, Northern Ireland, Scotland, and Wales; each association has a separate UEFA membership. The Faroe Islands, an autonomous country of the Kingdom of Denmark, also has its own football association which is a member of UEFA. The football association of Gibraltar, a British Overseas Territory, was approved as a member by UEFA in 2013. Kosovo was approved as a member in 2016, even though it is claimed by Serbia and is not recognised by several other UEFA member states.

Each UEFA member has its own football league system, except Liechtenstein. Clubs playing in each top-level league compete for the title as the country's club champions. Clubs also compete in the league and national cup competitions for places in the following season's UEFA club competitions, the UEFA Champions League and UEFA Europa League. Due to promotion and relegation, the clubs playing in the top-level league are different every season, except in San Marino where there is only one level.

Some clubs play in a national football league other than their own country's. Where this is the case the club is noted as such.

== Albania ==
- Football association: Football Association of Albania
- Second-level league: Albanian First Division
2024–25 Kategoria e Parë teams.

Club	Location
FK Apolonia	Fier
KF Besa	Kavajë
KF Burreli	Burrel
KF Erzeni	Shijak
Flamurtari FC	Vlorë
KS Kastrioti	Krujë
KF Korabi Peshkopi	Peshkopi
FK Kukësi	Kukës
KF Lushnja	Lushnjë
KF Pogradeci	Pogradec
KF Valbona	Bajram Curri
KF Vora	Vorë

== Andorra ==
- Country: Andorra
- Football association: Andorran Football Federation
- Second-level league:Segona Divisió

Team	Location
CE Carroi	Andorra la Vella
City Escaldes FC	Escaldes–Engordany
CF Atlètic Amèrica	Escaldes-Engordany
FC Rànger's B	Andorra la Vella
UE Santa Coloma B	Santa Coloma de Andorra

== Armenia ==
- Country: Armenia
- Football association: Football Federation of Armenia
- Second-level league:Armenian First League

Club	Location
Noah-2	Abovyan
Ararat Yerevan-2	Dzoraghbyur
Mika	Yerevan
Ararat-Armenia-2	Yerevan
BKMA-2	Yerevan
Syunik	Kapan
Lernayin Artsakh	Sisian
Bentonit	Vanadzor
Andranik	Vardenis
Nikarm	Ijevan
Pyunik-2	Yerevan
Shirak-2	Gyumri
Urartu-2	Yerevan

== Azerbaijan ==
- Country: Azerbaijan
- Football association: Association of Football Federations of Azerbaijan
- Second-level league:Azerbaijan First Division

Team	Location
Baku Sporting FK	Baku
Cəbrayıl FK	Jabrayil
Difai Ağsu	Agsu
İmişli FK	İmişli
Karvan	Yevlakh
Qaradağ Lökbatan	Baku
Qəbələ	Gabala
Mingəçevir	Mingachevir
MOİK	Baku
Zaqatala	Zaqatala

== Belarus ==
- Country: Belarus
- Football association: Football Federation of Belarus
- Second-level league: Belarusian First League
Location of teams in 2024 Belarusian First League

Team	Location
Energetik-BGU Minsk	Minsk
Belshina Bobruisk	Bobruisk
Lokomotiv Gomel	Gomel
Maxline Vitebsk	Vitebsk
Baranovichi	Baranovichi
Volna Pinsk	Pinsk
Niva Dolbizno	Dolbizno
Lida	Lida
Molodechno	Molodechno
Ostrovets	Ostrovets
Bumprom Gomel	Gomel
Orsha	Orsha
Slonim-2017	Slonim
Shakhtyor-2 Soligorsk	Soligorsk
Dinamo-2 Minsk	Minsk
BATE-2 Borisov	Borisov
Torpedo-BelAZ-2 Zhodino	Zhodino
ABFF U-17	Minsk

== Belgium ==
- Country: Belgium
- Football association: Royal Belgian Football Association
- Second-level league: Challenger Pro League
Locations of the 2024–25 Challenger Pro League teams

Club	City	Stadium	Capacity
Beveren	Beveren	Freethiel Stadion	8,190
Club NXT	Bruges (Note: Club NXT did not play its home matches at the same venue as the A-squad of Club Brugge (the Jan Breydel Stadium) but rather they moved to Roeselare to play in the Schiervelde Stadion.)	Schiervelde Stadion	8,340
Deinze	Deinze	Burgemeester Van de Wiele Stadion	7,515
Eupen	Eupen	Kehrwegstadion	8,363
Francs Borains	Boussu	Stade Robert Urbain	6,000
Jong Genk	Genk	Luminus Arena	24,956
La Louvière	La Louvière	Stade du Tivoli	12,500
Lierse	Lier	Herman Vanderpoortenstadion	14,538
Lokeren-Temse	Lokeren	Daknamstadion	12,136
Lommel SK	Lommel	Soevereinstadion	8,000
Patro Eisden Maasmechelen	Maasmechelen	Gemeentelijk Sportparkstadion	5,500
RFC Liège	Liège	Stade de Rocourt	8,000
RFC Seraing	Seraing	Stade du Pairay	8,207
RSCA Futures	Anderlecht, Brussels	King Baudouin Stadium	38,000
RWD Molenbeek	Molenbeek, Brussels	Edmond Machtens Stadium	12,266
Zulte Waregem	Waregem	Regenboogstadion	12,500

== Bosnia and Herzegovina ==
- Country: Bosnia and Herzegovina
- Football association: Football Association of Bosnia and Herzegovina
- Second-level league:First League of the Federation of Bosnia and Herzegovina and First League of the Republika Srpska

=== First League of the Federation of Bosnia and Herzegovina ===
Team	Location	Stadium	Capacity
Bratstvo Gračanica	Gračanica	Stadion Luke	5,200
Budućnost Banovići	Banovići	Stadion FK Budućnost	8,500
Čelik Zenica	Zenica	Bilino Polje Stadium	15,293
Goražde	Goražde	Stadion Midhat Drljević	1,500
Gornji Rahić	Gornji Rahić	SRC Gornji Rahić	1,190
Gradina	Srebrenik	Gradski Stadion	5,000
Jedinstvo Bihać	Bihać	Pod Borićima Stadium	7,500
Radnički Lukavac	Lukavac	Stadion Jošik	3,000
Radnik Hadžići	Hadžići	Hadžići City Stadium	500
Stupčanica	Olovo	Danac Stadium	1,500
Tomislav	Tomislavgrad	Gradski Stadion Tomislav	2,000
TOŠK Tešanj	Tešanj	Stadion Luke	7,000
Travnik	Travnik	Stadion Pirota	3,076
Tuzla City	Tuzla	Tušanj City Stadium	7,200
Vis Simm-Bau	Kosova	Grabovac Stadium	1,200
Zvijezda Gradačac	Gradačac	Stadion Banja Ilidža	5,000

=== First League of the Republika Srpska ===
Team
Zvijezda 09
Laktaši
Rudar Prijedor
Leotar
Željezničar Banja Luka
Famos Vojkovići
Kozara Gradiška
Sloboda Mrkonjić Grad
Slavija Sarajevo
Sutjeska Foča
Ljubić Prnjavor
Velež Nevesinje
BSK Banja Luka
Drina Zvornik
Borac Kozarska Dubica
Romanija Pale
Drina HE Višegrad
Sloboda Novi Grad

== Bulgaria ==
- Country: Bulgaria
- Football association: Bulgarian Football Union
- Second-level league:Second Professional Football League
Location of teams in 2024–25 Second League

Team	City
Belasitsa Petrich	Petrich
Botev II	Plovdiv
CSKA 1948 II	Sofia
CSKA Sofia II	Sofia
Dobrudzha	Dobrich
Dunav Ruse	Ruse
Etar	Veliko Tarnovo
Fratria	Varna
Lokomotiv	Gorna Oryahovitsa
Lovech	Lovech
Ludogorets II	Razgrad
Marek Dupnitsa	Dupnitsa
Minyor Pernik	Pernik
Montana	Montana
Nesebar	Nesebar
Pirin Blagoevgrad	Blagoevgrad
Spartak Pleven	Pleven
Sportist Svoge	Svoge
Strumska Slava	Radomir
Yantra	Gabrovo

== Croatia ==
- Country: Croatia
- Football association: Croatian Football Federation
- Second-level league: Second Football League
Locations of teams in 2024–25 Druga NL

Team	City	Stadium	Capacity
Bjelovar	Bjelovar	Gradski stadion	4,000
Dragovoljac	Novi Zagreb	Stadion NŠC Stjepan Spajić	5,000
Dugo Selo	Dugo Selo	Gradski stadion	2,000
Grobničan	Čavle	Stadion Adelija Haramija Beba	3,000
Hrvace	Hrvace	Gradski stadion	3,075
Jadran Luka Ploče	Ploče	Stadion NK Jadran	2,000
Jadran Poreč	Poreč	Stadion Veli Jože	5,000
Karlovac 1919	Karlovac	Stadion Branko Čavlović-Čavlek	12,000
Kustošija	Zagreb	Stadion Kustošija	2,550
Marsonia 1909	Slavonski Brod	Gradski stadion uz Savu	6,000
Mladost Ždralovi	Ždralovi	Stadion NK Mladost	1,500
Radnik Križevci	Križevci	Križevci City Stadium	1,500
Segesta	Sisak	Gradski stadion	8,000
Solin	Solin	Stadion pokraj Jadra	3,500
Trnje	Zagreb	Stadion ŠC Rudeš	2,000
Uljanik Pula	Pula	Stadion Veruda	4,000

== Cyprus ==
- Country: Cyprus
- Football association: Cyprus Football Association
- Second-level league: Cypriot Second Division
Locations of the 2024–25 Cypriot Second Division teams.

Club	Location
Achyronas-Onisilos	Sotira
AEZ Zakakiou	Zakaki
Akritas Chlorakas	Chloraka
Anagennisi Deryneia	Deryneia
ASIL	Larnaca
Ayia Napa	Ayia Napa
Chalkanoras Idaliou	Dali
Digenis Akritas Morphou	Morphou
Doxa Katokopias	Katokopia
Krasava ENY Ypsonas	Ypsonas
MEAP Nisou	Nisou
Olympiakos Nicosia	Nicosia
Othellos Athienou	Athienou
PAEEK	Lakatamia
Peyia 2014	Pegeia
Spartakos Kitiou	Kiti

== Czech Republic ==
- Country: Czech Republic
- Football association: Football Association of the Czech Republic
- Second-level league: Czech National Football League
Location of clubs in the 2024–25 league

The following 16 clubs are competing in the 2024–25 Czech National Football League:

Club	Location	Stadium	Capacity
FC Zlín	Zlín	Letná Stadion	5,898
SK Sigma Olomouc B	Olomouc	Andrův stadion	12,483
FC Silon Táborsko	Tábor	Stadion v Kvapilově ulici	1,500
MFK Vyškov	Vyškov	Sportovní areál Drnovice	4,500
MFK Chrudim	Chrudim	Za Vodojemem	1,500
SFC Opava	Opava	Stadion v Městských sadech	7,758
FC Sellier & Bellot Vlašim	Vlašim	Stadion Kollárova ulice	3,000
FK Viktoria Žižkov	Prague	eFotbal Arena	5,037
FC Zbrojovka Brno	Brno	Městský fotbalový stadion Srbská	10,200
SK Líšeň	Brno	Stadion SK Líšeň	2,000
AC Sparta Prague B	Prague	eFotbal Arena	5,037
1. SK Prostějov	Prostějov	Stadion Za Místním nádražím	4,500
FK Varnsdorf	Varnsdorf	Městský stadion v Kotlině	5,000
FC Vysočina Jihlava	Jihlava	Stadion v Jiráskově ulici	4,500
SK Slavia Prague B	Prague	Stadion Olympia Radotín	1,500
FC Baník Ostrava B	Ostrava	Městský stadion (Ostrava)	15,123

== Denmark ==
Main articles: List of football clubs in Denmark and List of football clubs in Denmark by league

- Country: Denmark
- Football association: Danish Football Association
- Second-level league: Danish 1st Division
Locations of the 2024–25 Danish 1st Division teams.
Copenhagen: Hvidovre IF and B.93

Locations of the 2024-25 Danish 1st Division teams.

Club	Location	Stadium	Capacity
Esbjerg fB	Esbjerg	Blue Water Arena	18,000
FC Fredericia	Fredericia	Monjasa Park	4,000
Hillerød Fodbold	Hillerød	Hillerød Stadium	5,000
Hobro IK	Hobro	DS Arena	10,700
AC Horsens	Horsens	CASA Arena Horsens	10,400
Hvidovre IF	Hvidovre	Hvidovre Stadion	12,000
Kolding IF	Kolding	Autocentralen Park	10,000
HB Køge	Herfølge/Køge	Capelli Sport Stadion	4,000
OB	Odense	Nature Energy Park	15,633
FC Roskilde	Roskilde	Roskilde Idrætspark	6,000
Vendsyssel FF	Hjørring	Hjørring Stadion	7,500
B.93	Copenhagen	Østerbro Stadium (2024)	7,000; 7,200

== England ==
- Country: England
- Football association: The Football Association
- Second-level league: EFL Championship
Locations of the 2024–25 EFL Championship teams

The following 24 clubs are competing in the Championship during the 2024–25 EFL Championship season.

Team	Location	Stadium	Capacity
Blackburn Rovers	Blackburn	Ewood Park	31,367
Bristol City	Bristol	Ashton Gate Stadium	27,000
Burnley	Burnley	Turf Moor	21,944
Cardiff City	Cardiff	Cardiff City Stadium	33,280
Coventry City	Coventry	Coventry Building Society Arena	32,609
Derby County	Derby	Pride Park Stadium	32,956
Hull City	Kingston upon Hull	MKM Stadium	25,586
Leeds United	Leeds	Elland Road	37,608
Luton Town	Luton	Kenilworth Road	12,000
Middlesbrough	Middlesbrough	Riverside Stadium	34,742
Millwall	London (Bermondsey)	The Den	20,146
Norwich City	Norwich	Carrow Road	27,359
Oxford United	Oxford	Kassam Stadium	12,500
Plymouth Argyle	Plymouth	Home Park	17,900
Portsmouth	Portsmouth	Fratton Park	20,899
Preston North End	Preston	Deepdale	23,404
Queens Park Rangers	London (Shepherd's Bush)	Loftus Road	18,439
Sheffield United	Sheffield	Bramall Lane	32,050
Sheffield Wednesday	Sheffield	Hillsborough Stadium	39,732
Stoke City	Stoke-on-Trent	bet365 Stadium	30,089
Sunderland	Sunderland	Stadium of Light	48,707
Swansea City	Swansea	Swansea.com Stadium	21,088
Watford	Watford	Vicarage Road	22,200
West Bromwich Albion	West Bromwich	The Hawthorns	26,850

== Estonia ==
- Country: Estonia
- Football association: Estonian Football Association
- Second-level league: Esiliiga
Locations of the 2025 Esiliiga teams

Team	Location	Stadium	Capacity
Elva	Elva	Elva linnastaadion	30
FCI Levadia U21	Tallinn	Maarjamäe Stadium	30
Flora U21	Tallinn	Sportland Arena	1,172
Nõmme Kalju U21	Nõmme	Hiiu Stadium	650
Nõmme United	Nõmme	Männiku Stadium	500
Tallinn	Tallinn	Lasnamäe Sports Complex Stadium	200
Tallinna Kalev U21	Tallinn	Kalevi Keskstaadion artificial turf	270
Tammeka U21	Tartu	Sepa Jalgpallikeskus	504
Viimsi	Haabneeme	Viimsi Stadium	800
Welco	Tartu	Holm Jalgpallipark	580

== Faroe Islands ==
- Country: Faroe Islands
- Football association: Faroe Islands Football Association
- Second-level league: 1. deild
Locations of the 2025 1.deild teams

Team	City	Stadium	Capacity
AB	Argir	Inni í Vika	2,000
B36 Tórshavn II	Tórshavn	Gundadalur	5,000
B71 Sandoy	Sandur	Inni í Dal	2,000
EB/Streymur II	Streymnes	Við Margáir	2,000
ÍF	Fuglafjørður	Í Fløtugerði	3,000
KÍ II	Klaksvík	Við Djúpumýrar	2,500
NSÍ Runavík II	Runavík	Við Løkin	2,000
07 Vestur II	Sørvágur	Á Dungasandi	2,000
Skála ÍF	Skála	Undir Mýruhjalla	2,000
Víkingur Gøta II	Leirvík	Sarpugerði	1,600

== Finland ==
- Country: Finland
- Football association: Football Association of Finland
- Second-level league:Ykkösliiga

The clubs in the 2025 Ykkösliiga season are:

Club	Location	Stadium	Capacity
EIF	Raseborg	Ekenäs Centrumplan	1,400
JIPPO	Joensuu	Mehtimäki	1,000
JäPS	Järvenpää	Järvenpään keskuskenttä	2,000
Klubi 04	Helsinki	Bolt Arena	10,770
KäPa	Helsinki	Brahenkenttä	1,200
Lahti	Lahti	Lahti Stadium	7,465
PK-35	Helsinki	Mustapekka Areena	2,200
SalPa	Salo	Salon Urheilupuisto	2,500
SJK Akatemia	Seinäjoki	OmaSP Stadion	5,817
TPS	Turku	Veritas Stadion	8,076

== France ==
- Country: France
- Football association: French Football Federation
- Second-level league: Ligue 2
Location of teams in 2024–25 Ligue 2

Club	Location	Venue	Capacity
Ajaccio	Ajaccio	Stade Michel-Moretti	10,446
Amiens	Amiens	Stade de la Licorne	12,097
Annecy	Annecy	Parc des Sports	15,660
Bastia	Furiani	Stade Armand-Cesari	16,078
Bordeaux	Bordeaux	Matmut Atlantique	42,115
Caen	Caen	Stade Michel d'Ornano	21,215
Clermont	Clermont-Ferrand	Stade Gabriel-Montpied	11,980
Dunkerque	Dunkerque	Stade Marcel-Tribut	4,933
Grenoble	Grenoble	Stade des Alpes	20,068
Guingamp	Guingamp	Stade de Roudourou	18,378
Laval	Laval	Stade Francis Le Basser	18,739
Lorient	Lorient	Stade du Moustoir	18,890
Martigues	Martigues	Stade Francis Turcan	8,290
Metz	Longeville-lès-Metz	Stade Saint-Symphorien	28,786
Paris FC	Paris (13th arrondissement)	Stade Sébastien-Charléty	20,000
Pau	Pau	Nouste Camp	4,031
Red Star	Paris (Saint-Ouen)	Stade Bauer	10,000
Rodez	Rodez	Stade Paul-Lignon	5,955

== Georgia ==
- Country: Georgia
- Football association: Georgian Football Federation
- Second-level league: Erovnuli Liga 2
Location of Liga 2 football clubs in 2025

Club	Location	Region
Dinamo-2	Tbilisi	Tbilisi
Gonio	Batumi	Adjara
Iberia-2 1999	Tbilisi	Tbilisi
Locomotive	Tbilisi	Tbilisi
Merani	Martvili	Samegrelo-Zemo Svaneti
Meshakhte	Tkibuli	Imereti
Rustavi	Rustavi	Kvemo Kartli
Samtredia	Samtredia	Imereti
Sioni	Bolnisi	Kvemo Kartli
Spaeri	Tbilisi	Tbilisi

== Germany ==
- Country: Germany
- Football association: German Football Association
- Second-level league: 2. Bundesliga
Locations of the 2024–25 2. Bundesliga teams

Team	Location	Stadium	Capacity
Eintracht Braunschweig	Braunschweig	Eintracht-Stadion	23,325
Hertha BSC	Berlin	Olympiastadion	74,649
Darmstadt 98	Darmstadt	Merck-Stadion am Böllenfalltor	17,650
Fortuna Düsseldorf	Düsseldorf	Merkur Spiel-Arena	54,600
SV Elversberg	Spiesen-Elversberg	Waldstadion an der Kaiserlinde	10,000
Greuther Fürth	Fürth	Sportpark Ronhof Thomas Sommer	16,626
Hamburger SV	Hamburg	Volksparkstadion	57,000
Hannover 96	Hanover	Heinz von Heiden Arena	49,000
1. FC Kaiserslautern	Kaiserslautern	Fritz-Walter-Stadion	49,327
Karlsruher SC	Karlsruhe	BBBank Wildpark	34,302
1. FC Köln	Cologne	RheinEnergieStadion	49,698
1. FC Magdeburg	Magdeburg	Avnet Arena	30,098
Preußen Münster	Münster	Preußenstadion	14,300
1. FC Nürnberg	Nuremberg	Max-Morlock-Stadion	49,923
SC Paderborn	Paderborn	Home Deluxe Arena	15,000
Jahn Regensburg	Regensburg	Jahnstadion Regensburg	15,210
Schalke 04	Gelsenkirchen	Veltins-Arena	62,271
SSV Ulm	Ulm	Donaustadion	19,500

== Gibraltar ==
- Country: Gibraltar
- Football association: Gibraltar Football Association
- Second-level league: None

== Greece ==
- Country: Greece
- Football association: Hellenic Football Federation
- Second-level league: Super League Greece 2

=== North Group ===
Locations of the 2024–25 Super League 2 North Group clubs

Team	City	Stadium	Capacity
AEL	Larissa	AEL FC Arena	16,118
Diagoras	Rhodes	Diagoras Stadium	3,693
Ethnikos Neo Keramidi	Neo Keramidi	Katerini Stadium	4,995
Iraklis	Thessaloniki	Kaftanzoglio Stadium	27,770
Kampaniakos	Chalastra	Chalastra Municipal Stadium	1,000
Kavala	Kavala	Anthi Karagianni Stadium	10,550
Makedonikos	Efkarpia	Makedonikos Stadium	8,100
Niki Volos	Volos	Pantelis Magoulas Stadium	4,000
PAOK B	Efkarpia	Makedonikos Stadium	8,100
PAS Giannina	Ioannina	Zosimades Stadium	7,652

=== South Group ===
Locations of the 2024–25 Super League 2 South Group clubs

Team	Location	Stadium	Capacity
AEK Athens Β	Spata	Serafidio Stadium	3,000
A.E. Kifisia	Kifisia	Zirineio Municipal Stadium	1,650
Asteras Tripolis B	Tripoli	Tripoli Municipal Stadium	1,000
Chania	Chania	Perivolia Municipal Stadium	4,527
Egaleo	Aigaleo	Stavros Mavrothalassitis Stadium	8,217
Ilioupoli	Ilioupoli	Ilioupoli Municipal Stadium	2,000
Kalamata	Kalamata	Kalamata Municipal Stadium	5,613
Panachaiki	Patra	Kostas Davourlis Stadium	11,321
Panargiakos	Argos	Argos Municipal Stadium	5,000
Panionios	Nea Smyrni	Nea Smyrni Stadium	11,700

== Hungary ==
- Country: Hungary
- Football association: Hungarian Football Federation
- Second-level league: Nemzeti Bajnokság II
Location of teams in 2024–25 Nemzeti Bajnokság II
Location of the teams in Budapest.

Following is the list of clubs competing in 2024–25 Nemzeti Bajnokság II.

Team	Location	Stadium	Cap.
Ajka	Ajka	Városi Stadion	5,000
Békéscsaba	Békéscsaba	Kórház utcai Stadion	2,479
Budafok	Budapest (Budafok)	Promontor utcai Stadion	4,000
BVSC	Budapest (Zugló)	Szőnyi úti Stadion	12,000
Csákvár	Csákvár	Tersztyánszky Ödön Sportközpont	2,020
Gyirmót	Győr (Gyirmót)	Alcufer Stadion	4,728
Honvéd	Budapest (Kispest)	Bozsik Aréna	8,000
Kazincbarcika	Kazincbarcika	Kolorcity Aréna	1,080
Kisvárda	Kisvárda	Várkerti Stadion	3,385
Kozármisleny	Kozármisleny	Kozármislenyi Stadion	2,000
Mezőkövesd	Mezőkövesd	Városi Stadion	4,183
Soroksár	Budapest (Soroksár)	Szamosi Mihály Sportelep	5,000
Szeged	Szeged	Szent Gellért Fórum	8,136
Szentlőrinc	Szentlőrinc	Szentlőrinci Sportpálya	1,020
Tatabánya	Tatabánya	Grosics Gyula Stadion	5,021
Vasas	Budapest (Angyalföld)	Illovszky Rudolf Stadion	5,154

== Iceland ==
- Country: Iceland
- Football association: Football Association of Iceland (Icelandic: Knattspyrnusamband Íslands)
- Second-level league:1. deild karla
Locations of the 2025 1. deild karla teams

Team	Location
Fjölnir	Reykjavík
Fylkir	Reykjavík
Grindavík	Grindavík
HK	Kópavogur
ÍR	Reykjavík
Keflavík	Keflavík
Leiknir Reykjavík	Reykjavík
Njarðvík	Njarðvík
Þróttur Reykjavík	Reykjavík
Þór	Akureyri
Selfoss	Selfoss
Völsungur	Húsavík

== Israel ==
- Country: Israel
- Football association: Israel Football Association
- Second-level league: Liga Leumit

Club	Home City	Stadium	Capacity
Bnei Yehuda Tel Aviv	Tel Aviv	Bloomfield Stadium	29,400
F.C. Kafr Qasim	Kafr Qasim	Haberfeld Stadium (Note: Play their home games at a neutral venue because their own ground does not meet league requirements.)	6,000
Hapoel Acre	Acre	Acre Municipal Stadium	5,000
Hapoel Afula	Afula	Afula Illit Stadium	3,000
Hapoel Kfar Saba	Kfar Saba	Levita Stadium	5,800
Hapoel Kfar Shalem	Tel Aviv	Ramat Gan Stadium	13,370
Hapoel Nof HaGalil	Nof HaGalil	Green Stadium	5,200
Hapoel Petah Tikva	Petah Tikva	HaMoshava Stadium	11,500
Hapoel Ra'anana	Ra'anana	Levita Stadium	5,800
Hapoel Ramat Gan	Ramat Gan	Ramat Gan Stadium	13,370
Hapoel Ramat HaSharon	Ramat HaSharon	Grundman Stadium	4,300
Hapoel Rishon LeZion	Rishon LeZion	Haberfeld Stadium	6,000
Hapoel Tel Aviv	Tel Aviv	Bloomfield Stadium	29,400
Hapoel Umm al-Fahm	Umm al-Fahm	HaShalom Stadium	5,800
Maccabi Jaffa	Tel Aviv	Ness Ziona Stadium	3,500
Maccabi Herzliya	Herzliya	Grundman Stadium	4,300

== Italy ==
- Country: Italy
- Football association: Federazione Italiana Giuoco Calcio
- Second-level league: Serie B
Locations of the 2024–25 Serie B teams

Team	Location	Stadium	Capacity
Bari	Bari	Stadio San Nicola	58,270
Brescia	Brescia	Stadio Mario Rigamonti	19,500
Carrarese	Carrara	Stadio dei Marmi	3,520
Catanzaro	Catanzaro	Stadio Nicola Ceravolo	14,650
Cesena	Cesena	Orogel Stadium-Dino Manuzzi	20,194
Cittadella	Cittadella	Stadio Pier Cesare Tombolato	7,623
Cosenza	Cosenza	Stadio San Vito-Gigi Marulla	20,987
Cremonese	Cremona	Stadio Giovanni Zini	15,191
Frosinone	Frosinone	Stadio Benito Stirpe	16,227
Juve Stabia	Castellammare di Stabia	Stadio Romeo Menti	7,642
Mantova	Mantua	Stadio Danilo Martelli	6,066
Modena	Modena	Stadio Alberto Braglia	21,151
Palermo	Palermo	Stadio Renzo Barbera	36,365
Pisa	Pisa	Arena Garibaldi – Stadio Romeo Anconetani	14,000
Reggiana	Reggio Emilia	Mapei Stadium – Città del Tricolore	21,525
Salernitana	Salerno	Stadio Arechi	20,194
Sampdoria	Genoa	Stadio Luigi Ferraris	33,205
Sassuolo	Sassuolo	Mapei Stadium – Città del Tricolore	21,515
Spezia	La Spezia	Stadio Alberto Picco	11,968
Südtirol	Bolzano	Stadio Druso	5,539

== Kazakhstan ==
- Country: Kazakhstan
- Football association: Football Union of Kazakhstan
- Second-level league: Kazakhstan First Division
Locations of teams in the 2024 Kazakhstan First Division

Club	Stadium	City
Aktobe	Central Stadium	Aktobe
Akzhayik	Petr Atoyan Stadium	Oral
Altai	Vostok Stadium	Oskemen
Arys	Kazhymukan Munaitpasov Stadium	Shymkent
Caspiy	Zhastar Stadium	Aktau
Ekibastuz	Shakhter Stadium	Ekibastuz
Jetisay	Central Stadium	Zhetisay
Kairat-Zhastar	Central Stadium	Almaty
Kaisar-2	Gani Muratbayev Stadium	Kyzylorda
Khan Tengri		
Kyran	Lokomotiv Stadium	Shymkent
Okzhetpes	Okzhetpes Stadium	Kokshetau
SD Family		Astana
Taraz	Central Stadium	Taraz
Turkestan	Kazhymukan Munaitpasov Stadium	Shymkent
Ulytau		Jezkazgan

== Kosovo ==
- Country: Kosovo
- Football association: Football Federation of Kosovo
- Second-level league: First Football League of Kosovo

Club	Town
Group A
Besa	Peja
Drenica	Skenderaj
Istogu	Istog
Liria	Prizren
Mitrovica	Mitrovica
Rahoveci	Rahovec
Rilindja 1974	Peja
Trepça	Mitrovica
Trepça '89	Mitrovica
Vëllaznimi	Gjakova
Group B
2 Korriku	Pristina
Dinamo Ferizaj	Ferizaj
Flamurtari	Pristina
Fushë Kosova	Kosovo Polje
KEK-u	Obiliq
Kika	Kamenica
Prishtina e Re	Hajvalia
Ramiz Sadiku	Pristina
Vjosa	Shtime
Vushtrria	Vushtrri

== Latvia ==
- Country: Latvia
- Football association: Latvian Football Federation
- Second-level league: Latvian First League

14 clubs are taking part in the 2024 First League season.

- RFS-2
- Leevon PPK
- Riga FC-2
- Valmiera FC-2/VSS
- Mārupes SC
- Skanstes SK
- JFK Ventspils
- JDFS Alberts
- Ogre United
- FK Smiltene/BJSS
- FK Tukums 2000-2/TSS
- SK Super Nova
- AFA Olaine
- Rēzekne

== Lithuania ==
- Country: Lithuania
- Football association: Lithuanian Football Federation
- Second-level league: I Lyga

Club
Atmosfera
Babrungas
Baltijos
Banga B
Ekranas
FA Šiauliai B
FK Be1
FK Garliava
FK Panevėžys B
FK TransINVEST
Hegelmann B
Kauno Žalgiris B
Minija
Neptūnas
Nevėžis
Tauras

== Luxembourg ==
- Country: Luxembourg
- Football association: Luxembourg Football Federation
- Second-level league: Luxembourg Division of Honour

The clubs competing in the 2026–27 season are listed below.

Team	Location	Stadium	Capacity	2025–26 position
FC Avenir Beggen	Beggen	Stade rue Henri Dunant	4,830	1st (1. Division Series 1) ▲
The Belval Belvaux	Belvaux	Stade FC The Belval	2,000	10th
Berdenia Berbourg	Berbourg	Stade Renert	800	11th
Bettembourg	Bettembourg	Stade Municipal Bettembourg	700	5th
Fola Esch	Esch-sur-Alzette	Stade Émile Mayrisch	7,826	8th
FC Jeunesse Canach	Canach	Stade Rue de Lenningen	1,000	13th (National Division) ▼
Koeppchen Wormeldange	Wormeldange	Stade Am Ga	1,000	14th
Lorentzweiler	Lorentzweiler	Terrain rue de Hunsdorf	1,000	13th
Luxembourg City	Luxembourg City	Luxembourg-Cents	2,800	6th
FC Mamer 32	Mamer	Stade François Trausch	2,600	14th (National Division) ▼
Marisca Mersch	Mersch	Terrain Schintgespesch	1,000	12th
Mondercange	Mondercange	Stade Communal	3,300	9th
Rodange 91	Rodange	Stade Joseph Philippart	3,400	16th (National Division) ▼
Union Titus Pétange	Pétange	Stade Municipal (Pétange)	2,400	15th (National Division) ▼
URB	Remich	Stade Op der Millen	1,000	1st (1. Division Series 2) ▲
US Feulen	Niederfeulen	Terrain In Bertzent	1,500	7th

== Malta ==
- Country: Malta
- Football association: Malta Football Association
- Second-level league: Maltese Challenge League
Location of teams in 2024–25 Maltese Challenge League

Team	Location
Fgura United	Fgura
Gudja United	Gudja
Lija Athletic	Lija
Marsa	Marsa
Mgarr United	Mgarr
Mtarfa	Mtarfa
Pietà Hotspurs	Pietà
Santa Lucia	Santa Luċija
Senglea Athletic	Senglea
Sirens	St. Paul's Bay
St. Andrews	St. Andrew's, Malta
Swieqi United	Swieqi
Tarxien Rainbows	Tarxien
Valletta	Valletta
Żebbuġ Rangers	Żebbuġ
Żurrieq	Żurrieq

== Moldova ==
- Country: Republic of Moldova
- Football association: Football Association of Moldova
- Second-level league: Moldovan Liga 1
Location of teams in 2024–25 Divizia A

Club	Location
Fălești	Fălești
Iskra	Rîbnița
Olimp	Comrat
Sheriff-2	Tiraspol
Saksan	Ceadîr-Lunga
Speranis	Nisporeni
Speranța	Drochia
Stăuceni	Stăuceni
Univer	Comrat
Ungheni	Ungheni
Victoria	Chișinău
Vulturii Cutezători	Sîngerei

== Montenegro ==
- Country: Montenegro
- Football association: Football Association of Montenegro
- Second-level league: Montenegrin Second League
Locations of the 2024–25 teams

Club	City	Stadium
Grbalj	Radanovići	Stadion Donja Sutvara (1,500)
Ibar	Rožaje	Bandžovo Brdo Stadium (3,000)
Igalo	Igalo	Stadion Solila (1,600)
Iskra	Danilovgrad	Braća Velašević Stadium (2,500)
Kom	Podgorica	Stadion Zlatica (1,200)
Lovćen	Cetinje	Stadion Sveti Petar Cetinjski (5,192)
Mladost	Podgorica	DG Arena (4,300)
Podgorica	Podgorica	DG Arena (4,300)
Rudar	Pljevlja	Stadion pod Golubinjom (5,140)

== Netherlands ==
- Country: Netherlands
- Football association: Royal Dutch Football Association
- Second-level league: Eerste Divisie
Location of teams in the 2024–25 Eerste Divisie

Club	Location	Venue	Capacity
ADO Den Haag	The Hague	Bingoal Stadion	15,000
Cambuur	Leeuwarden	Kooi Stadion	15,000
De Graafschap	Doetinchem	Stadion De Vijverberg	12,600
Den Bosch	's-Hertogenbosch	Stadion De Vliert	8,713
Dordrecht	Dordrecht	M-Scores Stadion	4,235
Eindhoven	Eindhoven	Jan Louwers Stadion	4,600
Emmen	Emmen	De Oude Meerdijk	8,600
Excelsior	Rotterdam	Van Donge & De Roo Stadion	4,500
Helmond Sport	Helmond	GS Staalwerken Stadion	4,100
Jong Ajax	Amsterdam	Sportpark De Toekomst	2,050
Jong AZ	Alkmaar	AFAS Trainingscomplex	200
Jong PSV	Eindhoven	PSV Campus De Herdgang	2,500
Jong FC Utrecht	Utrecht	Sportcomplex Zoudenbalch	550
MVV Maastricht	Maastricht	Stadion De Geusselt	10,000
Roda JC Kerkrade	Kerkrade	Parkstad Limburg Stadion	19,979
Telstar	Velsen	BUKO Stadion	3,060
TOP Oss	Oss	Frans Heesenstadion	4,560
Vitesse	Arnhem	GelreDome	21,248
Volendam	Volendam	Kras Stadion	7,384
VVV-Venlo	Venlo	Covebo Stadion - De Koel	8,000

== Northern Ireland ==
- Country: Northern Ireland
- Football association: Irish Football Association
- Second-level league: NIFL Championship
Locations of the 2024–25 NIFL Championship teams
Locations of the Belfast-based 2024–25 NIFL Championship teams

Club	Stadium	Location	Capacity
Annagh United	BMG Arena	Portadown	1,250 (100 seated)
Ards	Clandeboye Park	Bangor	1,895 (500 seated)
Armagh City	Holm Park	Armagh	2,000 (500 seated)
Ballinamallard United	Ferney Park	Ballinamallard	2,000 (250 seated)
Ballyclare Comrades	Dixon Park	Ballyclare	2,398 (538 Seated)
Bangor	Clandeboye Park	Bangor	1,895 (500 seated)
Dundela	Wilgar Park	Belfast	2,500
Harland & Wolff Welders	Blanchflower Stadium	Belfast	3,000 (2,000 seated)
Institute	Ryan McBride Brandywell Stadium	Derry	3,700
Limavady United	The Showgrounds	Limavady	524 (274 seated)
Newington	Inver Park	Larne	3,000
Newry City	The Showgrounds	Newry	2,275 (1,080 seated)

== Norway ==
- Country: Norway
- Football association: Football Association of Norway
- Second-level league: 1. divisjon
Locations of teams in the 2025 Norwegian First Division

Team	Location	County	Arena	Capacity
Aalesund	Ålesund	Møre og Romsdal	Color Line Stadion	10,778
Egersund	Egersund	Rogaland	B&G Parken	1,200
Hødd	Ulsteinvik	Møre og Romsdal	Høddvoll	4,081
Kongsvinger	Kongsvinger	Innlandet	Gjemselund	5,824
Lillestrøm	Lillestrøm	Akershus	Åråsen	12,250
Lyn	Oslo	Oslo	Bislett	15,400
Mjøndalen	Mjøndalen	Buskerud	Consto Arena	4,200
Moss	Moss	Østfold	Melløs	2,373
Odd	Skien	Telemark	Skagerak Arena	11,767
Ranheim	Trondheim	Trøndelag	EXTRA Arena	3,000
Raufoss	Raufoss	Innlandet	NAMMO Stadion	3,042
Skeid	Oslo	Oslo	OBOS Idrettspark Nordre Åsen	1,486
Sogndal	Sogndalsfjøra	Vestland	Fosshaugane Campus	5,622
Stabæk	Bærum	Akershus	Nadderud	4,938
Start	Kristiansand	Agder	Sparebanken Sør Arena	14,448
Åsane	Bergen	Vestland	Åsane Arena	3,300

== Poland ==
- Country: Poland
- Football association: Polish Football Association
- Second-level league: I liga
Location of teams in 2024–25 I liga.

Team	Location	Venue	Capacity
Arka Gdynia	Gdynia	GOSiR Stadium	15,139
Bruk-Bet Termalica Nieciecza	Nieciecza	Bruk-Bet Termalica Sports Stadium	4,666
Chrobry Głogów	Głogów	GOS Stadium	2,817
GKS Tychy	Tychy	Tychy Stadium	15,150
Górnik Łęczna	Łęczna	Górnik Łęczna Stadium	7,464
Kotwica Kołobrzeg	Kołobrzeg	Sebastian Karpiniuk Stadium	3,014
ŁKS Łódź	Łódź	Władysław Król Stadium	18,029
Miedź Legnica	Legnica	White Eagle Stadium	6,864
Odra Opole	Opole	Odra Stadium^{1} Opolski Stadium	4,560; 11,600
Pogoń Siedlce	Siedlce	Siedlce Stadium	2,901
Polonia Warsaw	Warsaw	Kazimierz Sosnkowski Stadium	7,150
Ruch Chorzów	Chorzów	Śląski Stadium^{2}	54,378
Stal Rzeszów	Rzeszów	Stal Rzeszów Stadium	11,547
Stal Stalowa Wola	Stalowa Wola	Subcarpathian Football Center	3,764
Warta Poznań	Poznań	Stadion Respect Energy^{3} Warta Poznań Stadium	5,383; 4,694
Wisła Kraków	Kraków	Henryk Reyman Stadium	33,326
Wisła Płock	Płock	Kazimierz Górski Orlen Stadion	15,004
Znicz Pruszków	Pruszków	Pruszków Stadium	1,977

== Portugal ==
- Country: Portugal
- Football association: Portuguese Football Federation
- Top-level league: Liga Portugal 2
Location of teams in 2024–25 Liga Portugal 2 (Mainland)
Location of teams in 2024–25 Liga Portugal 2 (Madeira)

Club	Location	Stadium	Capacity
Académico de Viseu	Viseu	Estádio Municipal do Fontelo	6,785
Alverca	Vila Franca de Xira	Complexo Desportivo FC Alverca	7,864
Benfica B	Seixal	Benfica Campus	2,644
Chaves	Chaves	Estádio Municipal Eng.º; Manuel Branco Teixeira	8,400
Feirense	Santa Maria da Feira	Estádio Marcolino de Castro	5,401
Felgueiras	Felgueiras	Estádio Dr. Machado de Matos	7,540
Leixões	Matosinhos	Estádio do Mar	5,225
Mafra	Mafra	Estádio Municipal de Mafra	1,249
Marítimo	Funchal	Estádio do Marítimo	10,565
Oliveirense	Oliveira de Azeméis	Estádio Carlos Osório	1,750
Paços de Ferreira	Paços de Ferreira	Estádio Capital do Móvel	9,076
Penafiel	Penafiel	Estádio Municipal 25 de Abril	5,230
Portimonense	Portimão	Estádio Municipal de Portimão	4,961
Porto B	Vila Nova de Gaia	Estádio Luís Filipe Menezes	3,800
Tondela	Tondela	Estádio João Cardoso	5,000
Torreense	Torres Vedras	Estádio Manuel Marques	2,431
União de Leiria	Leiria	Estádio Dr. Magalhães Pessoa	23,888
Vizela	Vizela	Estádio do Futebol Clube de Vizela	6,000

== Republic of Ireland ==
- Country: Republic of Ireland
- Football association: Football Association of Ireland
- Second-level league: League of Ireland First Division
Locations of the First Division teams

Team	Home city/suburb	Stadium
Athlone Town	Athlone	Athlone Town Stadium
Bray Wanderers	Bray	Carlisle Grounds
Cobh Ramblers	Cobh	St. Colman's Park
Cork City	Cork	Turners Cross
Finn Harps	Ballybofey	Finn Park
Kerry	Tralee	Mounthawk Park
Longford Town	Longford	Bishopsgate
Treaty United	Limerick	Markets Field
UCD	Dublin	UCD Bowl
Wexford	Crossabeg	Ferrycarrig Park

== Republic of North Macedonia ==
- Country: Republic of North Macedonia
- Football association: Football Federation of North Macedonia
- Second-level league: Macedonian Second Football League
Location of teams in 2024–25 Macedonian Second League

Club	City	Stadium	Capacity
Arsimi	Chegrane	Stadion Chegrane	
Bashkimi	Kumanovo	KF Bashkimi Stadium	3,500
Belasica	Strumica	Stadion Blagoj Istatov	6,500
Borec	Veles	Stadion Zoran Paunov	2,000
Bregalnica	Shtip	Gradski stadion Štip	4,000
Detonit Plachkovica	Radovish	Gradski stadion Radovish	2,000
Kozhuf	Gevgelija	Gradski stadion Gevgelija	1,400
Makedonija G.P.	Skopje	Gjorče Petrov Stadium	3,000
Novaci	Novaci	Stadion Novaci	500
Ohrid	Ohrid	SRC Biljanini Izvori	3,000
Osogovo	Kochani	Stadion Nikola Mantov	5,000
Pobeda	Prilep	Stadion Goce Delchev	15,000
Sasa	Makedonska Kamenica	Gradski stadion M. Kamenica	5,000
Skopje	Skopje	Stadion Zhelezarnica	3,000
Vardar Negotino	Negotino	Cvaj Arena	1,500
Vardarski	Bogdanci	Gradski Stadion Bogdanci	500

== Romania ==
- Country: Romania
- Football association: Romanian Football Federation
- Second-level league: Liga II
Locations of the 2024–25 Liga II teams
Location of Bucharest and Ilfov teams.

Team
1599 Șelimbăr
Afumați
Argeș Pitești
Bihor Oradea
Câmpulung Muscel
Ceahlăul Piatra Neamț
Chindia Târgoviște
Concordia Chiajna
Corvinul Hunedoara
Csíkszereda
FC U Craiova
CSM Reșița
CSM Slatina
Dumbrăvița
Metaloglobus București
Metalul Buzău
Mioveni
Steaua București
Unirea Ungheni
Viitorul Târgu Jiu
Voluntari

== Russia ==
- Country: Russia
- Football association: Football Union of Russia
- Second-level league: Russian Football National League
Location of teams in 2024–25 First League.

Team	Home city	Stadium	Capacity
Alania Vladikavkaz	Vladikavkaz	Republican Spartak Stadium	10,250
Arsenal Tula	Tula	Arsenal Stadium	19,241
Baltika Kaliningrad	Kaliningrad	Kaliningrad Stadium	35,016
Chayka Peschanokopskoye	Peschanokopskoye	Chayka Central Stadium	3,445
Chernomorets Novorossiysk	Novorossiysk	Central Stadium (Trud)	12,500
KAMAZ	Naberezhnye Chelny	KAMAZ stadium	6,248
Neftekhimik Nizhnekamsk	Nizhnekamsk	Neftekhimik Stadium	3,100
Rodina Moscow	Moscow	Spartakovets Stadium	5,000
Rotor Volgograd	Volgograd	Volgograd Arena	45,316
Shinnik Yaroslavl	Yaroslavl	Shinnik Stadium	22,990
SKA-Khabarovsk	Khabarovsk	Lenin Stadium	14,800
Sochi	Sochi	Fisht Olympic Stadium	44,287
Sokol Saratov	Saratov	Lokomotiv Stadium	15,000
Torpedo Moscow	Moscow	Luzhniki Stadium	81,000
Tyumen	Tyumen	Geolog Stadium	13,057
Ufa	Ufa	BetBoom Arena	15,234
Ural Yekaterinburg	Yekaterinburg	Yekaterinburg Arena	35,696
Yenisey Krasnoyarsk	Krasnoyarsk	Central Stadium	15,000

== San Marino ==
- Country: San Marino
- Football association: San Marino Football Federation
- Second-level League: NONE

== Scotland ==
- Country: Scotland
- Football association: Scottish Football Association
- Second-level league: Scottish Championship
Location of teams in 2024–25 Scottish Championship

Team
Airdrieonians
Ayr United
Dunfermline Athletic
Falkirk
Greenock Morton
Hamilton Academical
Livingston
Partick Thistle
Queen's Park
Raith Rovers

== Serbia ==
- Country: Serbia
- Football association: Football Association of Serbia
- Second-level league: Serbian First League
Location of teams in the 2024–25 Serbian First league

Team	City	Stadium	Capacity
Borac 1926	Čačak	Čačak Stadium	8,000
Dubočica	Leskovac	Dubočica Stadium	8,136
Grafičar	Belgrade	South artificial grass field of - Rajko Mitić Stadium	1,000
Inđija Toyo Tires	Inđija	Fudbalska Akademija (temporarily)	1,000
Javor-Matis	Ivanjica	Stadion kraj Moravice	5,000
Mačva	Šabac	Stadion FK Mačva Šabac	5,500
Mladost GAT	Novi Sad	GAT Arena	1,400
Radnik	Surdulica	Surdulica City Stadium	3,312
Radnički SM	Sremska Mitrovica	Fudbalska Akademija	1,000
Sloboda	Užice	Radomir Antić Stadium	9,949
Sloven	Ruma	Stadion Sloven	1,000
Smederevo 1924	Smederevo	Stadion SC Mladost (temporarily)	2,300
Trayal	Kruševac	Mladost Stadium	10,331
Voždovac	Belgrade	Voždovac Stadium	5,200
OFK Vršac	Vršac	Gradski stadion Vršac	5,000
Zemun	Belgrade	Zemun Stadium	9,600

== Slovakia ==
- Country: Slovakia
- Football association: Slovak Football Association
- Second-level league: MONACObet LIGA
Location of teams in Slovak 2. liga 2024–25

Team	Location	Stadium	Capacity
Liptovský Mikuláš	Liptovský Mikuláš	Stadium Liptovský Mikuláš	1,950
FC ŠTK 1914 Šamorín	Šamorín	Pomlé Stadium	1,950
MŠK Púchov	Púchov	Mestský štadión Púchov	6,614
FC ViOn Zlaté Moravce	Zlaté Moravce	ViOn Aréna	4,006
FC Petržalka	Bratislava	Štadión FC Petržalka	1,600
MŠK Žilina B	Žilina	Štadión pod Dubňom	11,258
Humenné	Humenné	Štadión Humenné	1,806
Považská Bystrica	Považská Bystrica	Štadión MŠK Považská Bystrica	2,500
1. FC Tatran Prešov	Prešov	Štadión MŠK Tesla Stropkov	2,500
FK Pohronie	Žiar nad Hronom	Mestský štadión Žiar nad Hronom	2,309
MFK Zvolen	Zvolen	MFK Lokomotíva Zvolen Stadium	1,870
Slovan Bratislava U21	Bratislava	Štadión Pasienky	11,401
Redfox FC Stará Ľubovňa	Stará Ľubovňa	Štadión Stará Ľubovňa	2,500
OFK Malženice	Malženice	OFK Dynamo Malženice Stadium	500

== Slovenia ==
- Country: Slovenia
- Football association: Football Association of Slovenia
- Second-level league: Slovenian Second League

Team
Aluminij
Beltinci
Bilje
Bistrica
Brinje Grosuplje
Drava Ptuj
Dravinja
Gorica
Ilirija 1911
Jadran Dekani
Krka
Rudar Velenje
Slovan
Tabor Sežana
Tolmin
Triglav Kranj

== Spain ==
- Country: Spain
- Football association: Royal Spanish Football Federation
- Second-level league: Segunda División
Location of teams in 2024–25 Segunda División
Location of teams in 2024–25 Segunda División (Canary Islands)

Team	Location	Stadium	Capacity
Albacete	Albacete	Estadio Carlos Belmonte	17,524
Almería	Almería	UD Almería Stadium	15,000
Burgos	Burgos	Estadio El Plantío	12,194
Cádiz	Cádiz	Estadio Nuevo Mirandilla	20,724
Cartagena	Cartagena	Estadio Cartagonova	15,105
Castellón	Castellón de la Plana	Estadio de Castalia	15,500
Córdoba	Córdoba	Estadio Nuevo Arcángel	20,989
Deportivo La Coruña	La Coruña	Estadio Riazor	32,660
Eibar	Eibar	Estadio Municipal de Ipurúa	8,164
Elche	Elche	Estadio Martínez Valero	31,388
Eldense	Elda	Estadio Pepico Amat	4,036
Granada	Granada	Estadio Nuevo Los Cármenes	19,189
Huesca	Huesca	Estadio El Alcoraz	9,100
Levante	Valencia	Estadio Ciutat de València	26,354
Málaga	Málaga	Estadio La Rosaleda	30,044
Mirandés	Miranda de Ebro	Estadio de Anduva	5,759
Oviedo	Oviedo	Estadio Carlos Tartiere	30,500
Racing Ferrol	Ferrol	Estadio de A Malata	12,043
Racing Santander	Santander	Campos de Sport de El Sardinero	22,222
Sporting Gijón	Gijón	Estadio El Molinón	29,371
Tenerife	Santa Cruz de Tenerife	Estadio Heliodoro Rodríguez López	22,824
Zaragoza	Zaragoza	Estadio de La Romareda	33,608

== Sweden ==
- Country: Sweden
- Football association: Swedish Football Association
- Second-level league: Superettan
Locations of the 2025 Superettan teams

Team	Location	Stadium	Stadium capacity
Umeå FC	Umeå	Gammliavallen	10,000
Falkenbergs FF	Falkenberg	Falcon Alkoholfri Arena	5,500
GIF Sundsvall	Sundsvall	NP3 Arena	8,000
Helsingborgs IF	Helsingborg	Olympia	16,000
IK Brage	Borlänge	Borlänge Energi Arena	6,500
IK Oddevold	Uddevalla	Rimnersvallen	4,000
Landskrona BoIS	Landskrona	Landskrona IP	10,000
Sandvikens IF	Sandviken	Jernvallen	7,000
Västerås SK	Västerås	Hitachi Energy Arena	8,900
Trelleborgs FF	Trelleborg	Vångavallen	7,357
Utsiktens BK	Gothenburg	Bravida Arena	6,316
Varbergs BoIS	Varberg	Påskbergsvallen	4,575
Örebro SK	Örebro	Behrn Arena	13,072
Örgryte IS	Gothenburg	Gamla Ullevi	18,454
Kalmar FF	Kalmar	Guldfågeln Arena	12,150
Östersunds FK	Östersund	Jämtkraft Arena	8,466

== Switzerland ==
- Country: Switzerland
- Football association: Swiss Football Association
- Second-level league: Swiss Challenge League
Locations of clubs in the 2024-25 Swiss Challenge League teams

Team	Location	Stadium	Capacity
FC Aarau	Aarau	Stadion Brügglifeld	8,000
AC Bellinzona	Bellinzona	Stadio Comunale	5,000
Étoile Carouge FC	Carouge	Stade de la Fontenette	3,600
FC Stade Lausanne-Ouchy	Lausanne	Stade Olympique	15,850
FC Stade Nyonnais	Nyon	Stade de Colovray	7,200
FC Schaffhausen	Schaffhausen	FCS Arena	8,200
FC Thun	Thun	Stockhorn Arena	10,014
FC Vaduz	(Liechtenstein) Vaduz	Rheinpark Stadion	7,584
FC Wil 1900	Wil	Lidl Arena	6,958
Neuchâtel Xamax FCS	Neuchâtel	Stade de la Maladière	11,997

== Turkey ==
- Country: Turkey
- Football association: Turkish Football Federation
- Second-level league: TFF First League
Location of teams in 2024–25 TFF First League
Clubs located in Istanbul

Team	Home city/borough	Home province	Stadium	Capacity
Adanaspor	Adana	Adana	New Adana Stadium	33,543
Amedspor	Diyarbakır	Diyarbakır	Diyarbakır Stadium	33,000
Ankaragücü	Ankara	Ankara	Eryaman Stadium	20,560
Bandırmaspor	Bandırma	Balıkesir	17 Eylül Stadium	12,725
Boluspor	Bolu	Bolu	Bolu Atatürk Stadium	8,456
Çorum	Çorum	Çorum	Çorum City Stadium	15,000
Erzurumspor	Erzurum	Erzurum	Kazım Karabekir Stadium	21,374
Esenler Erokspor	Esenler	Istanbul	Esenler Stadium	5,296
Fatih Karagümrük	Fatih	Istanbul	Vefa Stadium	12,000
Gençlerbirliği	Yenimahalle	Ankara	Eryaman Stadium	20,560
Iğdır	Iğdır	Iğdır	Iğdır City Stadium	2,700
İstanbulspor	Büyükçekmece	Istanbul	Esenyurt Necmi Kadıoğlu Stadium	7,500
Keçiörengücü	Keçiören	Ankara	Ankara Aktepe Stadium	4,883
Kocaelispor	İzmit	Kocaeli	Kocaeli Stadium	34,712
Manisa	Manisa	Manisa	Manisa 19 Mayıs Stadium	16,066
Pendikspor	Pendik	Istanbul	Pendik Stadium	2,500
Sakaryaspor	Adapazarı	Sakarya	New Sakarya Stadium	28,154
Şanlıurfaspor	Şanlıurfa	Şanlıurfa	Şanlıurfa 11 Nisan Stadium	28,965
Ümraniyespor	Ümraniye	Istanbul	Ümraniye Municipality City Stadium	3,513
Yeni Malatyaspor	Malatya	Malatya	New Malatya Stadium	27,044

== Ukraine ==
- Country: Ukraine
- Football association: Football Federation of Ukraine
- Second-level league: Ukrainian First League
Home venues of teams in the 2024–25 Ukrainian First League.
— Group A — Group B

Team	Home city	Stadium	Capacity
Ahrobiznes	Volochysk	Yunist	2,700
Bukovyna	Chernivtsi	Bukovyna	12,076
Dinaz	Demydiv	Dinaz	500
Epitsentr	Kamianets-Podilskyi	imeni Tonkocheyeva	2,587
Khust	Khust	Karpaty	5,200
Kremin	Kremenchuk	Kremin-Arena	1,500
Mariupol	Mariupol	Kolos (Boryspil)	5,400
Metalist	Kharkiv	Avanhard (Uzhhorod)	10,383
Metalist 1925	Kharkiv	Livyi Bereh Arena	4,700
Metalurh	Zaporizhia	Slavutych Arena	12,000
Mynai	Mynai	Mynai Arena	1,312
Kudrivka-Nyva	Buzova	Yuvileinyi (Bucha)	1,028
Nyva Ternopil	Ternopil	Misky imeni Shukhevycha	15,150
Podillya	Khmelnytskyi	Podillya	6,800
Poltava	Poltava	Molodizhnyi	680
Prykarpattia	Ivano-Frankivsk	Rukh	6,500
UCSA	Tarasivka	imeni Bannikova (Kyiv)	1,678
Viktoriya	Sumy	Yuvileiny	25,830

== Wales ==
- Country: Wales
- Football association: Football Association of Wales
- Second-level league: Cymru North and Cymru South
Locations of teams in the 2025–26 Cymru North and Cymru South.

=== Cymru North ===
Locations of teams in the 2025–26 Cymru North.
Locations of teams in the 2025–26 Cymru North from Flintshire.

Club	Location	Home Ground
Airbus UK Broughton	Broughton	The Airfield
Bangor 1876	Bangor	Nantporth
Buckley Town	Buckley	The Globe
Caersws	Caersws	Recreation Ground
Colwyn Bay	Colwyn Bay	Llanelian Road, Old Colwyn
Denbigh Town	Denbigh	Central Park
Flint Mountain	Flint	Cae-y-Castell
Gresford Athletic	Gresford	The Rock
Guilsfield	Guilsfield	Community Centre Ground
Holywell Town	Holywell	Halkyn Road
Llandudno	Llandudno	OPS Wind Arena
Llay Welfare	Llay	The Ring
Mold Alexandra	Mold	Alyn Park
Penrhyncoch	Penrhyn-coch	Cae Baker
Prestatyn Town	Prestatyn	Bastion Road
Ruthin Town	Ruthin	Memorial Playing Fields

=== Cymru South ===
Locations of teams in the 2025–26 Cymru South.
Locations of teams in the 2025–26 Cymru South from Neath Port Talbot.
Locations of teams in the 2025–26 Cymru South from Rhondda Cynon Taf.

Team	City	Stadium	Capacity
Afan Lido	Aberavon, Port Talbot	Marston's Stadium	3,000
Ammanford	Ammanford	Recreation Ground	1,000
Baglan Dragons	Baglan, Port Talbot	Evans Bevan Playing Field	1,000
Caerau (Ely)	Ely, Cardiff	Cwrt-yr-Ala Road	1,000
Cambrian United	Clydach Vale	King George V New Field	900
Carmarthen Town	Carmarthen	Richmond Park	2,500
Cwnbran Celtic	Cwmbran	Celtic Park	350
Goytre United	Goytre, Port Talbot	Glenhafod Park Stadium	1,500
Llanelli Town	Llanelli	Stebonheath Park	3,700
Llantwit Major	Llantwit Major	Windmill Ground	1,000
Newport City	Newport	Newport Stadium	4,300
Penrhiwceiber Rangers	Penrhiwceiber	Glasbrook Field	TBC
Pontypridd United	Pontypridd	USW Sports Park	1,000
Taff's Wall	Taff's Well	Rhiw'r Ddar	2,930
Trefelin BGC	Velindre, Port Talbot	Ynys Park	1,000
Trethomas Bluebirds	Trethomas	CCB Centre For Sporting Excellence	TBC

== See also ==
- List of top-division football clubs in UEFA countries
