= 2025 Belarusian First League =

Belarusian First League
- Season: 2025
- Champions: Baranovichi
- Promoted: Baranovichi; Dnepr Mogilev; Belshina Bobruisk
- Matches: 295
- Goals: 932 (3.16 per match)
- Top goalscorer: Martin Artyukh (21 goal)

2025 Belarusian First League was the 35th season of 2nd level football in Belarus. It started in March and finished in November 2025.

== Team changes from 2024 season ==
Two best teams of 2024 Belarusian First League (Molodechno and Maxline Vitebsk) were promoted to Belarusian Premier League. They were replaced by two last-placed teams of 2024 Belarusian Premier League (Dnepr Mogilev and Shakhtyor Soligorsk). Third-placed club Niva Dolbizno lost promotion/relegation play-off against Naftan Novopolotsk and remained in the First League for another season.

Two last placed teams of the last season (Torpedo-BelAZ-2 Zhodino and Energetik-BGU Minsk) relegated to the Second League. They were replaced by two best teams of 2024 Belarusian Second League (Minsk-2 and Partizan Soligorsk), although Partizan rejected promotion opportunity for the third time in a row.

After Shakhtyor Soligorsk were relegated from the Premier League, their farm club Shakhtyor-2 Soligorsk were automatically excluded from the First League. Shakhtyor Soligorsk themselves also withdrew from the league, after failing to apply for the license, in addition to having huge debts and a transfer ban.

Following the withdrawals of Shakhtyor, Shakhtyor-2 and Partizan, additional promotion spots were granted to Unixlabs Minsk, Gomel-2 and Osipovichi (4th, 5th and 9th-placed teams of the Second League).

ABFF-managed team ABFF U-17 was renamed to ABFF U-19, in accordance with the selected players' ages.

== Teams summary ==
Location of teams in 2025 Belarusian First League

Team	Location	Position in 2024
Dnepr Mogilev	Mogilev	14 (Premier League)
Niva Dolbizno	Dolbizno	3
Belshina Bobruisk	Bobruisk	4
Volna Pinsk	Pinsk	5
Lida	Lida	6
Dinamo-2 Minsk	Minsk	7
BATE-2 Borisov	Borisov	8
Bumprom Gomel	Gomel	9
Orsha	Orsha	10
Ostrovets	Ostrovets	11
Lokomotiv Gomel	Gomel	12
Baranovichi	Baranovichi	13
ABFF U-19	Minsk	14
Slonim-2017	Slonim	16
Minsk-2	Minsk	1 (Second League)
Unixlabs Minsk	Minsk	4 (Second League)
Gomel-2	Gomel	5 (Second League)
Osipovichi	Osipovichi	9 (Second League)

== League table ==
Pos	Team	Pld	W	D	L	GF	GA	GD	Pts	Promotion or relegation
1	Baranovichi (C, P)	34	23	5	6	75	29	+46	74	Promotion to the Belarusian Premier League
2	Dnepr Mogilev (P)	34	20	7	7	59	37	+22	67	Promotion to the Belarusian Premier League
3	Lokomotiv Gomel (Note: Lokomotiv Gomel cannot promote.) (W)	34	18	10	6	56	34	+22	64	Withdrew
4	Belshina Bobruisk (O, P)	34	19	6	9	64	40	+24	63	Advance to the promotion play-offs
5	Lida	34	19	2	13	74	44	+30	59	
6	Bumprom Gomel	34	16	11	7	56	36	+20	59	
7	Niva Dolbizno	34	15	10	9	68	56	+12	55	
8	BATE-2 Borisov	34	15	8	11	70	52	+18	53	Ineligible for promotion
9	Ostrovets	34	16	3	15	56	48	+8	51	
10	Minsk-2	34	15	6	13	49	47	+2	51	Ineligible for promotion
11	Volna Pinsk	34	13	9	12	65	55	+10	48	
12	ABFF U-19 (W)	34	11	9	14	44	49	−5	42	Withdrew
13	Dinamo-2 Minsk	34	10	10	14	34	40	−6	40	Ineligible for promotion
14	Unixlabs Minsk	34	10	6	18	54	72	−18	36	
15	Gomel-2 (O)	34	8	4	22	34	83	−49	28	Advance to the relegation play-offs
16	Orsha	34	7	4	23	42	93	−51	25	
17	Osipovichi	34	6	6	22	41	78	−37	24	
18	Slonim-2017 (T)	34	6	2	26	31	79	−48	20	Relegation cancelled

Source: football.by
Rules for classification: 1) Points; 2) Head-to-head points; 3) Head-to-head goal difference; 4) Head-to-head goals scored; 5) Goal difference; 6) Matches won; 7) Goals scored.
(C) Champions; (O) Play-off winners; (P) Promoted; (T) Originally relegated, but readmitted to fill vacancy; (W) Withdrew after the season

== Results ==
Home \ Away	BFF	BAR	BT2	BSH	BUM	DM2	DNE	GO2	LID	LGM	MI2	NIV	ORS	OSI	OST	SLO	UNI	VOL
ABFF U-19		0–1	1–0	2–0	0–2	1–2	3–4	2–0	0–2	2–2	0–2	1–1	2–2	3–2	1–0	2–1	2–0	1–3
Baranovichi	1–0		4–1	2–1	1–1	2–1	1–1	4–1	3–2	1–2	1–2	3–1	5–1	2–0	1–1	1–2	4–1	1–0
BATE-2 Borisov	2–2	1–1		1–0	2–3	2–2	2–1	5–1	2–1	2–0	3–2	1–1	7–2	3–1	1–3	4–0	5–1	0–2
Belshina Bobruisk	3–1	2–1	0–0		2–0	1–1	0–1	2–1	3–1	0–1	4–2	2–4	3–0	1–3	0–2	2–0	3–0	2–2
Bumprom Gomel	4–2	1–2	4–0	0–2		3–0	1–1	3–1	3–2	1–0	0–1	4–1	4–0	1–1	1–1	2–1	1–1	1–1
Dinamo-2 Minsk	0–0	2–2	0–2	0–1	0–2		0–0	1–0	0–1	0–1	0–0	1–1	2–0	4–0	0–1	5–0	3–1	0–4
Dnepr Mogilev	2–1	0–3	1–1	3–1	3–1	1–1		3–0	2–0	0–0	0–1	1–0	0–2	3–2	2–0	4–0	2–0	3–1
Gomel-2	0–0	0–2	1–4	2–2	1–1	2–0	2–3		0–5	2–2	0–1	1–0	2–5	3–2	2–3	1–0	0–3	0–5
Lida	2–1	1–2	2–2	1–2	3–1	4–1	2–1	3–0		1–2	3–1	7–0	2–0	1–0	4–1	4–2	3–1	1–2
Lokomotiv Gomel	1–0	1–0	2–2	1–2	3–0	0–0	3–2	4–1	1–0		1–0	1–1	4–0	3–0	2–1	3–1	2–1	3–3
Minsk-2	1–2	2–1	1–0	1–1	0–2	0–1	0–3	7–0	2–3	1–0		2–3	0–1	3–2	1–0	0–2	1–1	0–1
Niva Dolbizno	2–2	0–2	5–3	1–2	2–2	1–0	2–2	1–0	1–0	2–4	2–2		2–1	2–2	2–1	2–1	2–2	2–4
Orsha	1–2	0–2	0–5	1–2	0–3	2–1	1–2	1–3	1–3	3–3	1–1	1–4		2–2	1–3	3–0	0–3	3–2
Osipovichi	2–1	0–4	1–2	0–4	1–1	1–2	0–2	1–2	3–2	1–1	1–2	0–7	4–2		0–2	3–0	0–2	0–2
Ostrovets	0–0	0–2	2–1	0–3	0–1	0–1	1–2	1–2	1–3	2–0	4–1	1–2	6–2	2–1		3–0	5–3	2–1
Slonim-2017	1–3	0–6	2–4	0–2	0–2	0–2	1–2	1–0	0–0	2–1	1–2	0–2	4–1	0–3	1–3		1–2	1–1
Unixlabs Minsk	1–2	2–6	1–1	2–6	0–0	3–0	3–0	1–2	0–3	2–2	1–2	0–4	0–1	5–2	3–1	2–4		3–0
Volna Pinsk	2–2	0–2	2–1	3–3	0–1	1–1	1–2	5–1	3–2	1–1	2–3	0–5	5–1	1–1	1–3	3–1	1–2	

Source: football.by
Legend: Blue = home team win; Yellow = draw; Red = away team win.

== Top goalscorers ==
Rank	Goalscorer	Team	Goals
1	(Belarus) Martin Artyukh	Baranovichi	21
2	(Belarus) Aleksandr Burnos	Lida	20
2	(Belarus) Pavel Pampukha	Niva Dolbizno	20
4	(Belarus) Ilya Gubarevich	ABFF U-19	16
4	(Belarus) Dmitry Matyash	Volna Pinsk	16
4	(Belarus) Ilya Sen	Bumprom Gomel	16
7	(Belarus) Arseny Achapovsky	Belshina Bobruisk	14
7	(Belarus) Dmitry Fedortsov	Niva Dolbizno	14
9	(Belarus) Bogdan Gusev	ABFF U-19	12
9	(Belarus) Vital Kibuk	Volna Pinsk	12

Source: football.by

== See also ==
- 2025 Belarusian Premier League
- 2025–26 Belarusian Cup
