= 2024 Belarusian First League =

34th season of 2nd level football in Belarus

Belarusian First League
- Season: 2024
- Promoted: Molodechno; Maxline Vitebsk
- Relegated: Energetik-BGU Minsk; Torpedo-BelAZ-2 Zhodino
- Matches: 306
- Goals: 884 (2.89 per match)
- Top goalscorer: Dmitry Fedortsov (22 goals)

2024 Belarusian First League is the 34th season of 2nd level football in Belarus. It started in April and ended in November 2024.

== Team changes from 2023 season ==
Two best teams of 2023 Belarusian First League (Arsenal Dzerzhinsk and Dnepr Mogilev) were promoted to Belarusian Premier League. They were replaced by the last-placed team of 2023 Belarusian Premier League (Belshina Bobruisk). Third-placed club Vitebsk won the promotion/relegation play-off against Energetik-BGU Minsk and got promoted as well, while Energetik-BGU relegated to the First League to replace Vitebsk.

Last placed team of the last season (Osipovichi) relegated to the Second League.

Three clubs were supposed to get promoted from the Second League. 2023 Second League champions Partizan Soligorsk and runners-up Krumkachy Minsk did not apply for the First League license due to insufficient financing. Third-placed club Football Center Brest initially confirmed their intentions to get promoted, but in February withdrew their application due to apparent conflict between club's owner and ABFF. For the first time in history of the First League, no club got promoted from the Second League.

On 11 February 2024, Zhodino-Yuzhnoye announced that the club withdrew from the league and ceased to exist.

At a series of ABFF executive committee meetings in January–March 2024 it was decided that Belarusian Premier League Reserves Championship will be abolished and reserve teams of Premier League clubs are to be integrated into First and Second leagues as farm clubs, with a maximum of 4 farm clubs in the First League. For 2024 season, the First League included three best teams of 2023 Reserves Championships (Dinamo-2 Minsk, BATE-2 Borisov and Torpedo-BelAZ-2 Zhodino) as well as Shakhtyor-2 Soligorsk (which became direct successor to Shakhtyor Petrikov). In addition, a special team (ABFF U-17) was created under direct management from ABFF to develop youth players as candidates for Belarus national under-19 football team.

== Teams summary ==
Location of teams in 2024 Belarusian First League

Team	Location	Position in 2023
Energetik-BGU Minsk	Minsk	14 (Premier League)
Belshina Bobruisk	Bobruisk	15 (Premier League)
Lokomotiv Gomel	Gomel	4
Maxline Vitebsk	Vitebsk	5
Baranovichi	Baranovichi	6
Volna Pinsk	Pinsk	8
Niva Dolbizno	Dolbizno	9
Lida	Lida	10
Molodechno	Molodechno	11
Ostrovets	Ostrovets	12
Bumprom Gomel	Gomel	13
Orsha	Orsha	14
Slonim-2017	Slonim	15
Shakhtyor-2 Soligorsk	Soligorsk	16 (First League) / 11 (Reserves League)
Dinamo-2 Minsk	Minsk	1 (Reserves League)
BATE-2 Borisov	Borisov	2 (Reserves League)
Torpedo-BelAZ-2 Zhodino	Zhodino	3 (Reserves League)
ABFF U-17	Minsk	n/a

== League table ==
Pos	Team	Pld	W	D	L	GF	GA	GD	Pts	Promotion or relegation
1	Molodechno (C, P)	34	23	7	4	62	26	+36	76	Promotion to the Belarusian Premier League
2	Maxline Vitebsk (P)	34	23	4	7	75	27	+48	73	Promotion to the Belarusian Premier League
3	Niva Dolbizno	34	21	7	6	73	34	+39	70	Advance to the promotion play-offs
4	Belshina Bobruisk	34	23	5	6	84	42	+42	69 (Note: Belshina Bobruisk were deducted 5 points for match-fixing.)	
5	Volna Pinsk	34	21	3	10	70	43	+27	66	
6	Lida	34	15	7	12	48	40	+8	52	
7	Dinamo-2 Minsk	34	15	7	12	54	39	+15	52	
8	BATE-2 Borisov	34	14	7	13	46	54	−8	49	
9	Bumprom Gomel	34	13	9	12	50	37	+13	48	
10	Orsha	34	11	12	11	46	51	−5	45	
11	Ostrovets	34	12	7	15	44	57	−13	43	
12	Lokomotiv Gomel	34	8	11	15	42	50	−8	35	
13	Baranovichi	34	9	7	18	30	60	−30	34	
14	ABFF U-17	34	9	6	19	31	52	−21	33	
15	Shakhtyor-2 Soligorsk	34	9	4	21	33	61	−28	31	
16	Slonim-2017	34	6	8	20	26	65	−39	26	
17	Torpedo-BelAZ-2 Zhodino (R)	34	6	3	25	34	91	−57	21	Relegation to the Belarusian Second League
18	Energetik-BGU Minsk (R)	34	7	8	19	36	55	−19	19 (Note: Energetik-BGU Minsk were deducted 10 points for match-fixing.)	Relegation to the Belarusian Second League

Source: football.by
Rules for classification: 1) Points; 2) Head-to-head points; 3) Head-to-head goal difference; 4) Head-to-head goals scored; 5) Goal difference; 6) Matches won; 7) Goals scored.
(C) Champions; (P) Promoted; (R) Relegated

== Results ==
Home \ Away	BFF	BAR	BT2	BSH	BUM	DM2	ENE	LID	LGM	MAX	MOL	NIV	ORS	OST	SH2	SLO	TB2	VOL
ABFF U-17		2–0	3–1	0–0	2–1	0–2	0–1	1–1	1–1	0–2	0–1	1–2	1–2	1–3	0–1	1–0	0–4	0–2
Baranovichi	2–2		0–1	0–4	2–1	0–3	2–0	0–2	2–1	2–4	0–3	1–3	0–2	2–1	0–1	0–0	2–1	3–2
BATE-2 Borisov	3–0	2–1		2–1	1–0	0–5	1–1	1–1	1–1	0–6	0–1	1–0	4–0	3–2	0–0	0–0	6–2	1–3
Belshina Bobruisk	1–0	5–0	1–0		2–0	3–1	2–0	3–1	2–1	2–4	2–0	1–3	5–0	1–1	1–0	4–0	2–1	3–1
Bumprom Gomel	2–2	2–1	3–0	1–2		3–1	4–1	4–1	0–0	0–1	2–1	0–0	3–4	3–1	3–0	1–0	1–0	1–2
Dinamo-2 Minsk	0–1	0–0	1–2	2–2	1–2		3–2	0–2	0–0	1–0	3–3	1–2	2–2	3–0	0–1	2–0	3–0	4–0
Energetik-BGU Minsk	0–1	0–0	0–2	3–2	0–1	1–2		0–0	2–0	2–5	0–1	0–4	1–1	0–1	2–1	6–0	0–2	1–4
Lida	1–2	3–0	2–0	1–5	0–0	1–1	1–0		2–1	2–2	0–1	0–2	0–1	0–1	1–5	4–0	4–0	1–0
Lokomotiv Gomel	3–2	3–3	1–2	0–2	2–0	1–1	1–1	0–2		0–3	1–1	4–0	1–1	4–0	4–1	1–0	5–2	0–3
Maxline Vitebsk	3–0	1–2	1–0	1–1	0–0	0–1	1–0	1–0	3–0		4–2	0–1	1–1	3–1	3–0	5–0	5–0	2–0
Molodechno	3–2	1–1	3–1	5–0	0–0	2–1	3–3	1–0	3–0	1–0		1–0	2–0	1–1	2–0	2–1	4–0	3–0
Niva Dolbizno	1–0	0–1	6–1	5–3	3–3	5–1	2–1	0–1	2–0	3–1	0–0		1–1	1–0	2–1	0–0	7–1	1–2
Orsha	2–0	4–0	1–1	1–3	1–0	1–0	2–2	2–4	1–1	0–1	0–1	3–5		1–1	3–2	2–0	0–2	1–1
Ostrovets	1–2	1–0	3–1	2–2	0–0	0–3	1–0	0–2	1–1	1–2	0–2	3–3	0–5		1–0	3–2	3–0	1–0
Shakhtyor-2 Soligorsk	2–0	0–1	1–3	3–5	2–1	1–2	0–0	2–4	2–1	0–3	0–2	0–2	0–0	2–3		0–1	1–0	1–4
Slonim-2017	1–1	0–0	1–1	0–2	0–0	1–0	2–3	2–2	1–0	1–4	2–3	0–3	2–0	2–1	1–2		0–1	2–3
Torpedo-BelAZ-2 Zhodino	0–3	3–2	1–3	3–6	1–8	0–2	0–1	0–1	1–3	2–1	0–2	0–3	1–1	2–4	1–1	2–3		1–1
Volna Pinsk	3–0	2–0	2–1	0–4	3–0	1–2	3–2	2–1	2–0	1–2	2–1	1–1	3–0	3–2	5–0	6–1	3–0	

Updated to match(es) played on completed. Source: football.by
Legend: Blue = home team win; Yellow = draw; Red = away team win.

== Top goalscorers ==
Rank	Goalscorer	Team	Goals
1	(Belarus) Dmitry Fedortsov	Niva Dolbizno	22
2	(Belarus) Pavel Pampukha	Niva Dolbizno	14
3	(Belarus) Maksim Budko	Dinamo-2 Minsk	13
3	(Belarus) Denis Kozlovskiy	Maxline	13
3	(Belarus) Valery Potorocha	Belshina Bobruisk	13

Updated to games played on 30 November 2024
Source: football.by

== See also ==
- 2024 Belarusian Premier League
- 2024–25 Belarusian Cup
