= Boris Konevega =

Belarusian footballer

Personal information
- Date of birth: 6 August 1995 (age 31)
- Place of birth: Brest, Belarus
- Height: 1.78 m (5 ft 10 in)
- Position: Midfielder

Team information
- Current team: Niva Dolbizno (assistant coach)

Youth career
- 2012–2013: Dinamo Brest

Senior career*
Years	Team	Apps	(Gls)
2014–2016	Dinamo Brest	43	(0)
2017	Volna Pinsk	27	(4)
2018–2019	Rukh Brest	22	(0)
2020	Dinamo Malorita	22	(1)
2021–2022	Niva Dolbizno	33	(14)

International career
2014	Belarus U21	1	(0)

Managerial career
- 2023: Niva Dolbizno
- 2023–: Niva Dolbizno (assistant)
- * Club domestic league appearances and goals

Boris Konevega (Belarusian: Барыс Канявега; Russian: Борис Коневега; born 6 August 1995) is a Belarusian professional football coach and former player.

== Honours ==
Dinamo Brest

- Belarusian Cup winner: 2016–17
