= Klimentiy Gavrilov =

Belarusian footballer

Personal information
- Date of birth: 9 August 2002 (age 24)
- Place of birth: Minsk, Belarus
- Height: 1.81 m (5 ft 11 in)
- Position: Midfielder

Youth career
- 2016–2020: Isloch Minsk Raion

Senior career*
Years	Team	Apps	(Gls)
2020	Isloch Minsk Raion	2	(0)
2020	Energetik-BGU Minsk	0	(0)
2021	Slonim-2017	19	(0)
2022	MŠK Tatran Spišské Vlachy		
2022–2023	Huragan Międzyrzec Podlaski		
- * Club domestic league appearances and goals as of 22 September 2023

Klimentiy Gavrilov (Belarusian: Кліменцій Гаўрылаў; Russian: Климентий Гаврилов; born 9 August 2002) is a Belarusian professional footballer who plays as a midfielder.
