= Artyukh =

Artyukh, also transliterated Artiukh, is a Ukrainian and Belarusian surname. Notable people with the surname include:

- Danil Artyukh (born 2003), Kazakhstani water polo player
- Katsiaryna Artyukh (born 1991), Belarusian hurdler
- Martin Artyukh (born 1996), Belarusian footballer
- Serhiy Artiukh (born 1985), Ukrainian footballer
- Volodymyr Artyukh (born 1958), Ukrainian politician
