= Tarasivka =

Tarasivka (Ukrainian: Тарасівка) may refer to several places in Ukraine:

== Cherkasy Oblast ==
- Tarasivka, Chornobai Raion, a village in Chornobai Raion
- Tarasivka, Monastyrysche Raion, a village in Monastyrysche Raion
- Tarasivka, Zvenyhorodka Raion, a village in Zvenyhorodka Raion

== Chernihiv Oblast ==
- Tarasivka, Ichnia Raion, a village in Ichnia Raion
- Tarasivka, Korop Raion, a village in Korop Raion
- Tarasivka, Pryluky Raion, a village in Pryluky Raion

== Crimea ==
- Tarasivka, Dzhankoi Raion, a village in Dzhankoi Raion
- Tarasivka, Nyzhnohirskyi Raion, a village in Nyzhnohirskyi Raion

== Dnipropetrovsk Oblast ==
- Tarasivka, Krynychky Raion, a village in Krynychky Raion
- Tarasivka (Pochyno-Sofiyivka), Mahdalynivka Raion, a village in Pochyno-Sofiivka silrada, Mahdalynivka Raion
- Tarasivka (Shevcenkivka), Mahdalynivka Raion, a village in Shevcenkivka silrada, Mahdalynivka Raion
- Tarasivka (Topchyne), Mahdalynivka Raion, a village in Topchyne silrada, Mahdalynivka Raion
- Tarasivka, Mezhova Raion, a village in Mezhova Raion
- Tarasivka, Sofiyivka Raion, a village in Sofiivka Raion
- Tarasivka, Tomakivka Raion, a village in Tomakivka Raion
- Tarasivka, Tsarychanka Raion, a village in Tsarychanka Raion
- Tarasivka, Verkhnodniprovsk Raion, a village in Verkhnodniprovsk Raion

== Donetsk Oblast ==
- Tarasivka, Kostiantynivka Raion, a village in Kostiantynivka Raion
- Tarasivka, Volnovakha Raion, a village in Volnovakha Raion

== Ivano-Frankivsk Oblast ==
- Tarasivka, Ivano-Frankivsk Oblast, a village in Tlumach Raion

== Kharkiv Oblast ==
- Tarasivka, Kharkiv Oblast, a village in Sakhnovshchyna Raion

== Kherson Oblast ==
- Tarasivka, Oleshky Raion, a village in Oleshky Raion
- Tarasivka, Skadovsk Raion, a village in Skadovsk Raion

== Khmelnytskyi Oblast ==
- Tarasivka, Horodok Raion, a village in Horodok Raion
- Tarasivka, Iziaslav Raion, a village in Iziaslav Raion
- Tarasivka, Kamianets-Podilskyi Raion, a village in Kamianets-Podilskyi Raion
- Tarasivka, Yarmolyntsi Raion, a village in Yarmolyntsi Raion

== Kyiv Oblast ==
- Tarasivka, Bila Tserkva Raion, a village in Bila Tserkva Raion
- Tarasivka, Boryspil Raion, a village in Boryspil Raion
- Tarasivka, Brovary Raion, a village in Brovary Raion
- Tarasivka, Boiarka hromada, Fastiv Raion, a village in Boiarka urban hromada, Fastiv Raion
- Tarasivka, Kozhanka hromada, a village in Kozhanka rural hromada, Fastiv Raion
- Tarasivka, Kaharlyk Raion, a village in Kaharlyk Raion
- Tarasivka, Kyiv-Sviatoshyn Raion, a village in Kyiv-Sviatoshyn Raion
- Tarasivka, Myronivka Raion, a village in Myronivka Raion
- Tarasivka, Obukhiv Raion, a village in Obukhiv Raion
- Tarasivka, Pereiaslav-Khmelnytskyi Raion, a village in Pereiaslav-Khmelnytskyi Raion
- Tarasivka, Skvyra Raion, a village in Skvyra Raion
- Tarasivka, Tetiiv Raion, a village in Tetiiv Raion
- Tarasivka, Volodarka Raion, a village in Volodarka Raion

== Kirovohrad Oblast ==
- Tarasivka, Bobrynets Raion, a village in Bobrynets Raion
- Tarasivka, Mala Vyska Raion, a village in Mala Vyska Raion
- Tarasivka, Novhorodka Raion, a village in Novhorodka Raion
- Tarasivka, Novoarkhanhelsk Raion, a village in Novoarkhanhelsk Raion
- Tarasivka, Oleksandriia Raion, a village in Oleksandriia Raion
- Tarasivka, Oleksandrivka Raion, a village in Oleksandrivka Raion

== Luhansk Oblast ==
- Tarasivka, Luhansk Oblast, a village in Troitske Raion

== Lviv Oblast ==
- Tarasivka, Lviv Oblast, a village in Pustomyty Raion

== Mykolaiv Oblast ==
- Tarasivka, Bashtanka Raion, a village in Bashtanka Raion
- Tarasivka, Kazanka Raion, a village in Kazanka Raion
- Tarasivka, Pervomaisk Raion, a village in Pervomaisk Raion
- Tarasivka, Vradiivka Raion, a village in Vradiivka Raion

== Odesa Oblast ==
- Tarasivka, Odesa Oblast, a village in Ivanivka Raion

== Poltava Oblast ==
- Tarasivka, Hrebinka Raion, a village in Hrebinka Raion
- Tarasivka, Karlivka Raion, a village in Karlivka Raion
- Tarasivka, Khorol Raion, a village in Khorol Raion
- Tarasivka, Orzhytsia Raion, a village in Orzhytsia Raion
- Tarasivka, Semenivka Raion, a village in Semenivka Raion
- Tarasivka, Zinkiv Raion, a village in Zinkiv Raion

== Sumy Oblast ==
- Tarasivka, Krolevets Raion, a village in Krolevets Raion
- Tarasivka, Velyka Pysarivka Raion, a village in Velyka Pysarivka Raion

== Ternopil Oblast ==
- Tarasivka, Ternopil Oblast, a village in Zbarazh Raion

== Vinnytsia Oblast ==
- Tarasivka, Chechelnyk Raion, a village in Chechelnyk Raion
- Tarasivka, Haisyn Raion, a village in Haisyn Raion
- Tarasivka, Kalynivka Raion, a village in Kalynivka Raion
- Tarasivka, Mohyliv-Podilskyi, a village in Mohyliv-Podilskyi
- Tarasivka (Lopatynka), Orativ Raion, a village in Pochyno-Sofiyivka selsoviet, Orativ Raion
- Tarasivka (Pidvysoke), Orativ Raion, a village in Shevcenkivka selsoviet, Orativ Raion
- Tarasivka, Tulchyn Raion, a village in Tulchyn Raion
- Tarasivka, Zhmerynka Raion, a village in Zhmerynka Raion

== Zakarpattia Oblast ==
- Tarasivka, Zakarpattia Oblast, a village in Tiachiv Raion

== Zaporizhia Oblast ==
- Tarasivka, Chernihivka Raion, a village in Chernihivka Raion
- Tarasivka, Orikhiv Raion, a village in Orikhiv Raion
- Tarasivka, Polohy Raion, a village in Polohy Raion

== Zhytomyr Oblast ==
- Tarasivka, Andrushivka Raion, a village in Andrushivka Raion
- Tarasivka, Malyn Raion, a village in Malyn Raion
- Tarasivka, Zhytomyr Raion, a village in Zhytomyr Raion
