= Belarus national under-17 football team =

National U-17 association football team

- Association: Football Federation of Belarus
- Confederation: UEFA (Europe)
- FIFA code: BLR
First colours	Second colours

UEFA U-17 European Championship
- Appearances: 1 (first in 2005)
- Best result: Group stage (2005)

The Belarus national under-17 football team is the national under-17 football (soccer) team of Belarus and is controlled by the Football Federation of Belarus.

== UEFA European Under-16/Under-17 Football Championship record ==
=== Under-16 format ===
Finals record		Qualification record							
Year	Result	Pos	Pld	W	D*	L	GF	GA	GD
(Republic of Ireland) 1994	Quarter-finals	1	2	2	0	0	8	0	+8
(Belgium) 1995	did not qualify	3	4	0	0	4	1	14	-13
(Austria) 1996	did not qualify	2	3	2	0	1	3	4	-1
(Germany) 1997	did not qualify	3	2	0	0	2	1	3	-2
(Scotland) 1998	did not qualify	2	2	1	0	1	6	3	+3
(Czech Republic) 1999	did not qualify	2	2	0	1	1	1	5	-4
(Israel) 2000	did not qualify	3	4	0	0	4	1	13	-12
(England) 2001	did not qualify	2	3	2	0	1	6	6	0
Total	1/8	Best: 1	22	7	1	14	27	48	−21

=== Under-17 format ===
Finals record		Qualification record							
Year	Result	Pos	Pld	W	D*	L	GF	GA	GD
(Denmark) 2002	did not qualify	2	2	1	0	1	2	6	-4
(Portugal) 2003	did not qualify	3	3	2	0	1	5	8	-3
(France) 2004	Elite round	4	6	1	2	3	7	9	-2
(Italy) 2005	Group stage	4	3	1	0	2	2	9	-7
(Luxembourg) 2006	did not qualify	3	3	1	1	1	1	1	0
(Belgium) 2007	Elite round	2	6	3	1	2	12	10	+2
(Turkey) 2008	did not qualify	3	3	1	0	2	6	8	-2
(Germany) 2009	Elite round	3	6	2	1	3	10	7	+3
(Liechtenstein) 2010	did not qualify	3	3	1	0	2	4	3	+1
(Serbia) 2011	Elite round	3	6	3	0	3	20	18	+2
(Slovenia) 2012	Elite round	3	6	2	2	2	10	7	+3
(Slovakia) 2013	Elite round	4	5	2	0	3	7	14	-7
(Malta) 2014	did not qualify	3	3	1	0	2	2	4	-2
(Bulgaria) 2015	Elite round	3	6	3	1	2	7	6	+1
(Azerbaijan) 2016	did not qualify	4	3	0	1	2	3	6	-3
(Croatia) 2017	Elite round	3	6	2	1	3	7	9	-2
(England) 2018	did not qualify	3	3	1	0	2	4	5	-1
(Republic of Ireland) 2019	Elite round	3	6	1	3	2	7	12	-5
(Estonia) 2020	Cancelled due to COVID-19 pandemic								
(Cyprus) 2021	Cancelled due to COVID-19 pandemic								
(Israel) 2022	did not qualify	3	3	1	1	1	2	1	+1
(Hungary) 2023	Elite round	3	6	2	2	2	12	13	-1
(Cyprus) 2024	Elite round	4	6	2	1	3	5	6	-1
Total	1/21	Best: 1	97	36	17	44	147	159	−12

*Denotes draws include knockout matches decided on penalty kicks.

== Players ==
=== Current squad ===
The following players were called up for the most recent matches in 2026 UEFA European Under-17 Championship qualification.

No.	Pos.	Player	Date of birth (age)	Club
1	GK	Daniil Yanovich	15 March 2009 (age 17)	(Football Federation of Belarus) Akademia ABFF
16	GK	Grigoriy Borovik	6 January 2009 (age 17)	(Russian Football Union) Rodina Moscow
2	DF	Sergey Guzdelskiy	7 October 2009 (age 17)	(Football Federation of Belarus) Dinamo Minsk
6	DF	Roman Zdukhov	16 April 2009 (age 17)	(Football Federation of Belarus) Dinamo Minsk
25	DF	Nikita Tishkov	20 April 2009 (age 17)	(Football Federation of Belarus) Akademia ABFF
4	DF	Artem Shulunov	31 March 2009 (age 17)	(Football Federation of Belarus) Akademia ABFF
18	DF	Evgeniy Nesterenko	2 December 2009 (age 16)	(Football Federation of Belarus) Dinamo Minsk
19	MF	Timofey Gudach	5 June 2009 (age 17)	(Football Federation of Belarus) Dinamo Minsk
	MF	Dmitriy Lozhechnik	22 February 2009 (age 17)	(Football Federation of Belarus) Akademia ABFF
8	MF	Maksim Karpovich (captain)	2 April 2009 (age 17)	(Football Federation of Belarus) Akademia ABFF
9	MF	Nikita Sanko	2 April 2009 (age 17)	(Football Federation of Belarus) Dinamo Minsk
11	MF	Ivan Omelyusik	12 February 2009 (age 17)	(Football Federation of Belarus) Akademia ABFF
	MF	Ivan Bachauskas	23 January 2009 (age 17)	(Football Federation of Belarus) Dinamo Minsk
10	MF	Makar Kotlovskiy	31 May 2009 (age 17)	(Football Federation of Belarus) Dinamo Minsk
20	MF	Marat Titov	20 November 2009 (age 16)	(Football Federation of Belarus) Akademia ABFF
17	MF	Nikolay Alkhimenko	21 August 2009 (age 17)	(Football Federation of Belarus) Akademia ABFF
21	MF	Vladislav Voronin	26 May 2009 (age 17)	(Football Federation of Belarus) Dinamo Minsk
7	FW	Aleksandr Veretennikov	19 March 2009 (age 17)	(Football Federation of Belarus) Akademia ABFF
22	FW	Danila Leonenko	20 August 2009 (age 17)	(Football Federation of Belarus) Dinamo Minsk
23	FW	Aleksey Apanasevich	5 September 2009 (age 17)	(Football Federation of Belarus) BATE

== See also ==
- Belarus national football team
- Belarus national under-23 football team
- Belarus national under-21 football team
- Belarus national under-19 football team
