= Orlovich =

Orlovich is a Russian-language surname of Belarusian origin. Notable people with the surname include:

- Aleksey Orlovich (born 2002), Belarusian footballer
- Vaentin Orlovich (born 1947), Soviet and Belarusian physicist, academician of the National Academy of Sciences of Belarus
