= Andrey Shtygel =

Belarusian footballer

Personal information
- Date of birth: 22 June 1994 (age 32)
- Place of birth: Grodno, Belarus
- Height: 1.80 m (5 ft 11 in)
- Position: Midfielder

Youth career
- 2010–2012: Neman Grodno
- 2012–2014: Dinamo Minsk

Senior career*
Years	Team	Apps	(Gls)
2012–2014	Dinamo Minsk	0	(0)
2012	→ Dinamo-2 Minsk	14	(1)
2015	Neman Grodno	3	(0)
2015	→ Lida (loan)	15	(3)
2016	Lida	24	(1)
2017	Naftan Novopolotsk	24	(0)
2018	Gomel	15	(1)
2019	Naftan Novopolotsk	25	(3)
2021	Smorgon	20	(0)
- * Club domestic league appearances and goals as of 31 December 2021

Andrey Shtygel (Belarusian: Андрэй Штыгель; Russian: Андрей Штыгель; born 22 June 1994) is a Belarusian professional football player.

== Match-fixing incidents ==
On 16 January 2020, the BFF banned Shtygel for 12 months for his involvement in the match fixing. On 2 December 2021 Shtygel was banned from Belarusian football for life for another attempt to fix a game.
