= Čegrane Municipality =

Coordinates: 41.8358°N 20.9736°E

Municipality of Čegrane Komuna e Çegranit Општина Чегране
- Former Municipality
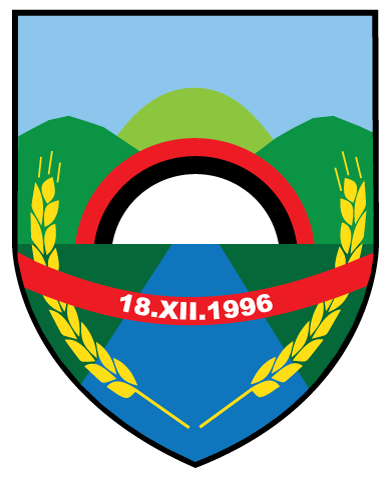
- Flag Coat of arms

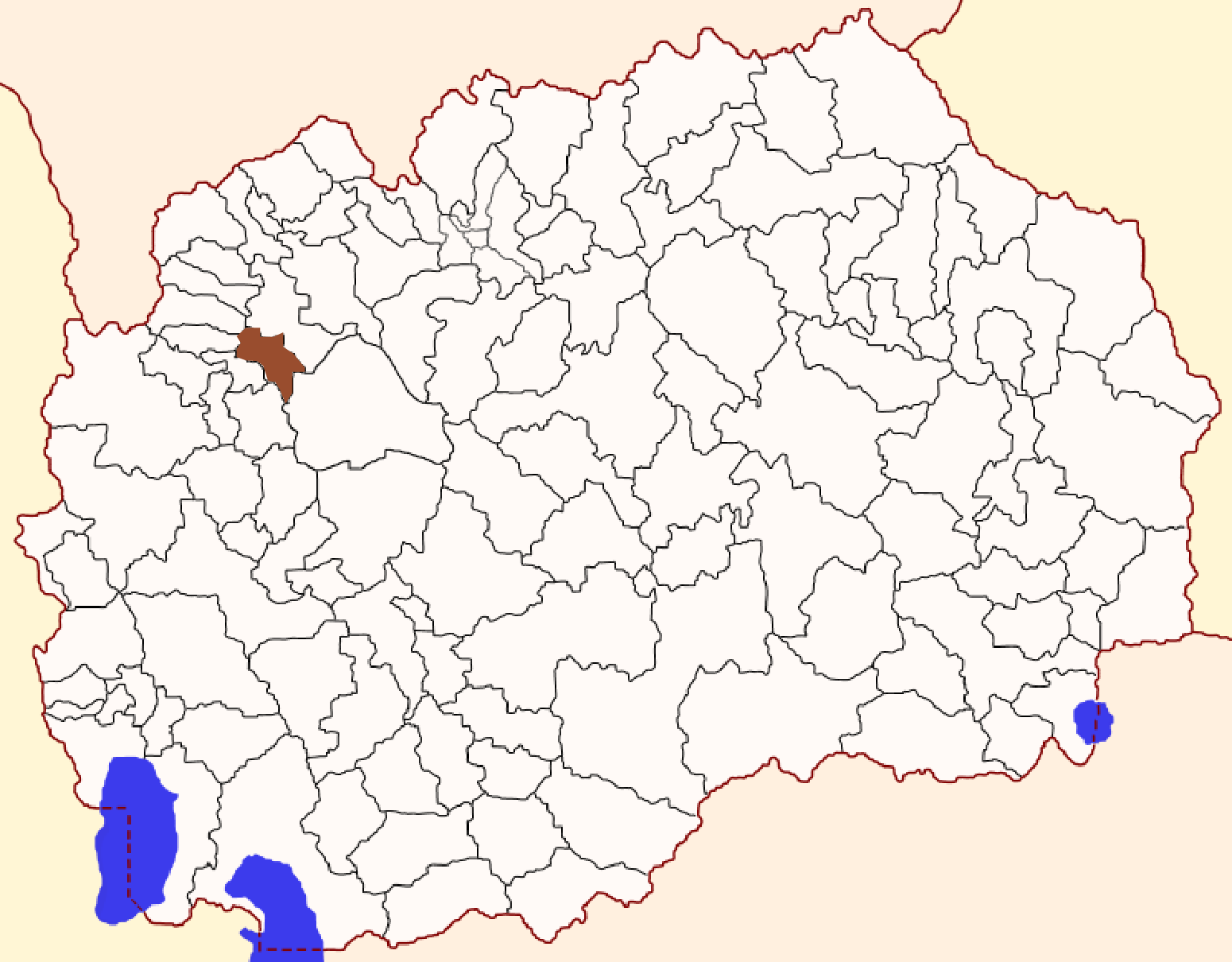
- Country: North Macedonia
- region: Polog Statistical Region
- Municipal seat: Čegrane

Government
  - mayor: Emshi Ejupi , Shaban Saliu

Population
  - Total: 12,310
- Time zone: UTC+1 (CET)
- Postal code: 1237
- Area code: +389
- Split from: Gostivar Municipality in 1996
- Merged into: Gostivar Municipality in 2004
- Car plates: GV

The Municipality of Čegrane in Polog Statistical Region, North Macedonia, was formed on 18 December 1996 and merged in 2004 into the Municipality of Gostivar.

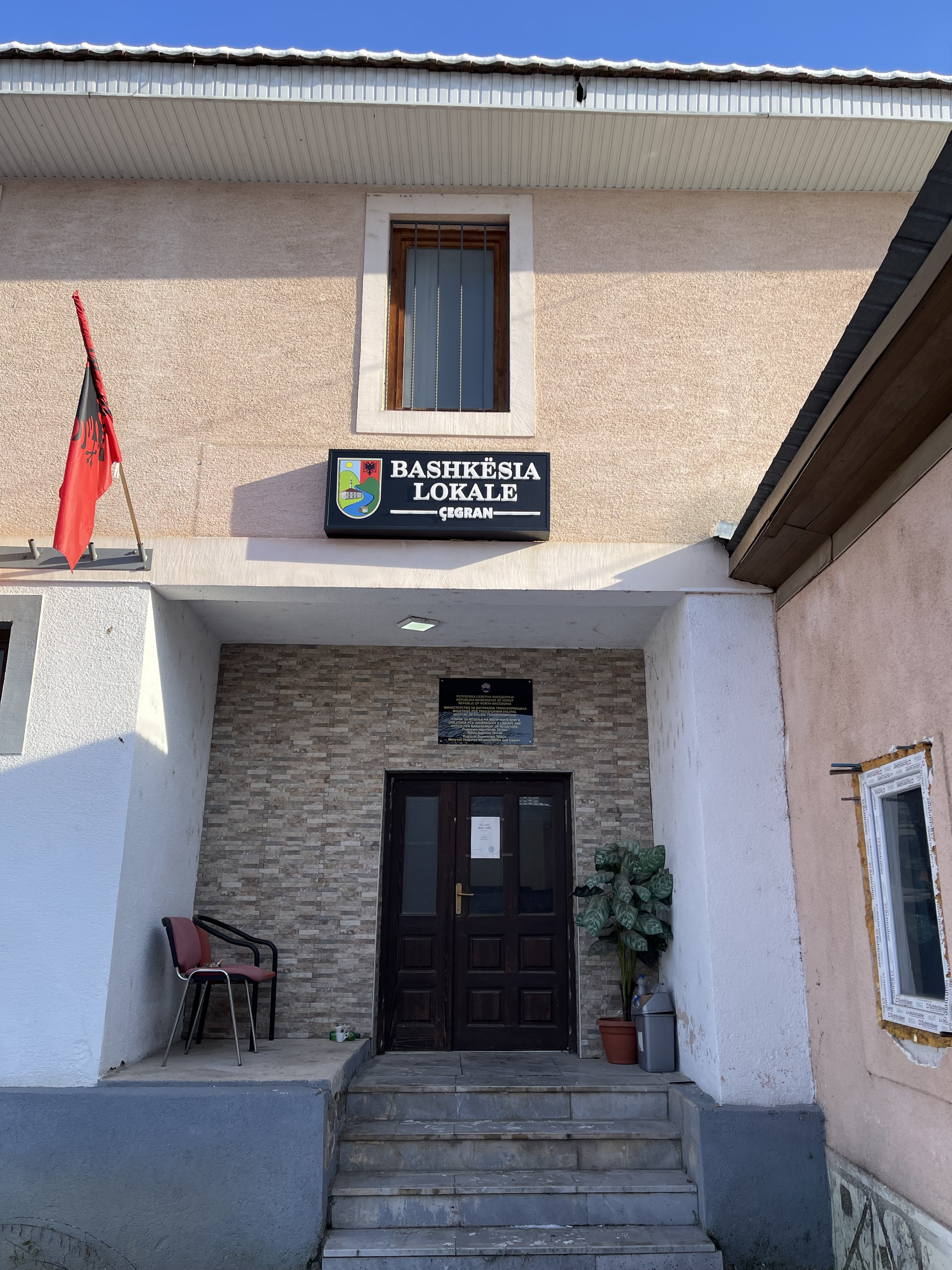
Local community in Čegrane

== Demographics ==
According to the last national census from 2002 this municipality has 12310 inhabitants. Ethnic groups in the municipality include:

- Albanians = 12,075 (97,65%)
- Macedonians = 235 (2,35%)

== Inhabited places ==
The municipality has 4 inhabited places,4 villages.

Inhabited places in Čegrane Municipality
Village(s): Čegrane, Forino, Korito, Tumčevište
