= 2020 Belarusian Premier League Reserves Championship =

Belarusian Premier League Reserves Championship
- Season: 2020

2020 Belarusian Premier League Reserves Championship is the official reserve season football in Belarus. It will start in March and finish in November.

The league consists of Reserves sides matching those competing in the 2020 Belarusian Premier League.

== League table ==
Pos	Team	Pld	W	D	L	GF	GA	GD	Pts
1	Isloch Minsk Raion Reserves	18	13	2	3	40	19	+21	41
2	Dinamo Minsk Reserves	16	12	3	1	42	10	+32	39
3	Minsk Reserves	15	10	4	1	32	14	+18	34
4	Neman Grodno Reserves	15	10	2	3	32	17	+15	32
5	Shakhtyor Soligorsk Reserves	17	9	3	5	36	24	+12	30
6	Rukh Brest Reserves	18	9	1	8	40	37	+3	28
7	Torpedo-BelAZ Zhodino Reserves	16	8	3	5	30	20	+10	27
8	BATE Borisov Reserves	18	7	2	9	29	32	−3	23 (Note: Head-to-head points: BATE Borisov Reserves 3, Slutsk Reserves 0)
9	Slutsk Reserves	17	6	5	6	31	30	+1	23
10	Smolevichi Reserves	17	7	1	9	22	37	−15	22 (Note: Head-to-head goal difference: Smolevichi Reserves +2, Vitebsk Reserves -2)
11	Vitebsk Reserves	18	6	4	8	33	46	−13	22
12	Energetik-BGU Minsk Reserves	17	6	2	9	27	30	−3	20
13	Belshina Bobruisk Reserves	18	4	4	10	25	32	−7	16
14	Dynamo Brest Reserves	16	3	3	10	22	37	−15	12
15	Slavia Mozyr Reserves	16	2	5	9	12	26	−14	11
16	Gorodeya Reserves	18	0	2	16	14	56	−42	2

Updated to match(es) played on 17 July 2020. Source: Soccerway
Rules for classification: 1) Points; 2) Head-to-head points; 3) Head-to-head goal difference; 4) Head-to-head goals scored; 5) Goal difference; 6) Matches won; 7) Goals scored.

== Results ==
Each team plays home-and-away once against every other team for a total of 30 matches played each.

Home \ Away	BAT Reserves	BSH Reserves	DBR Reserves	DMI Reserves	ENE Reserves	GRD Reserves	ISL Reserves	FCM Reserves	NEM Reserves	RUH Reserves	SHA Reserves	SLA Reserves	SLU Reserves	SML Reserves	TZH Reserves	VIT Reserves
BATE Borisov Reserves	—			2–0	2–1		1–2		1–2	1–4	1–3	1–0	3–0		0–2	
Belshina Bobruisk Reserves	0–2	—	0–0	0–1		4–0		1–3				0–0		6–2	1–0	3–3
Dynamo Brest Reserves	2–6		—	1–2		4–1	2–4	0–0			2–4	2–0		1–2		
Dinamo Minsk Reserves				—	4–0		0–0	0–0	5–0	2–0	2–1		2–1		1–0	
Energetik-BGU Minsk Reserves	1–1	2–0	2–1		—	3–1		1–2		1–4						5–2
Gorodeya Reserves	0–2	2–4		0–6		—	0–2	2–3	0–1		0–0		1–4			0–0
Isloch Minsk Raion Reserves		5–2			2–1		—		0–2	4–1		3–0	4–0	2–3		4–1
Minsk Reserves	3–0	2–0		2–2			2–0	—			3–0		3–3		3–1	
Neman Grodno Reserves		5–2	3–0		2–1		1–2		—	4–1				5–1		4–0
Rukh Brest Reserves	3–3	2–1	4–0	2–5	3–0	2–0		3–1		—				0–1		5–4
Shakhtyor Soligorsk Reserves		2–1			3–1	4–1	0–1		1–1	4–0	—	4–1	4–2		1–1	
Slavia Mozyr Reserves	4–2					1–0		0–1	1–1	0–2		—	1–1	1–1	0–1	
Slutsk Reserves		0–0	5–1		0–3		1–1		0–1	3–2		2–1	—		2–0	3–3
Smolevichi Reserves	2–0			0–3	2–1		1–2				0–4		0–4	—		4–0
Torpedo-BelAZ Zhodino Reserves		1–0	2–2		0–0	9–4				3–2	4–1			2–0	—	3–1
Vitebsk Reserves	3–1		2–1	1–7		4–1		1–4	2–0		3–0	1–1		2–0		—

Updated to match(es) played on 17 July 2020. Source: Soccerway
Legend: Blue = home team win; Yellow = draw; Red = away team win.
