= Aleksey Orlovich =

Belarusian footballer

Personal information
- Date of birth: 22 August 2002 (age 24)
- Place of birth: Minsk, Belarus
- Height: 1.81 m (5 ft 11 in)
- Position: Defender

Team information
- Current team: Slonim-2017
- Number: 19

Youth career
- 2017–2021: Isloch Minsk Raion

Senior career*
Years	Team	Apps	(Gls)
2020–2022	Isloch Minsk Raion	1	(0)
2022	→ Ostrovets (loan)	0	(0)
2022	→ Arsenal Dzerzhinsk (loan)	0	(0)
2023	Osipovichi	25	(0)
2024–	Slonim-2017	22	(0)
- * Club domestic league appearances and goals as of 10 December 2024

Aleksey Orlovich (Belarusian: Аляксей Арловіч; Russian: Алексей Орлович; born 22 August 2002) is a Belarusian professional footballer who plays for Slonim-2017.
