= Dmitry Sibilev =

Belarusian footballer

Personal information
- Date of birth: 23 July 2000 (age 26)
- Place of birth: Brest, Belarus
- Height: 1.75 m (5 ft 9 in)
- Position: Midfielder

Team information
- Current team: Niva Dolbizno
- Number: 8

Youth career
- 2014–2018: Dinamo Brest

Senior career*
Years	Team	Apps	(Gls)
2018	Dinamo Brest	0	(0)
2018–2021	Rukh Brest	33	(1)
2020	→ Krumkachy Minsk (loan)	14	(2)
2021	→ Dinamo Brest (loan)	4	(0)
2021	→ Smorgon (loan)	13	(0)
2022	Naftan Novopolotsk	24	(1)
2023–2024	Isloch Minsk Raion	29	(0)
2025–	Niva Dolbizno	47	(1)

International career^{‡}
2019–2021	Belarus U21	3	(0)
- * Club domestic league appearances and goals as of 6 July 2026 ‡ National team caps and goals as of 29 March 2021

Dmitry Sibilev (Belarusian: Дзмітрый Сібілёў; Russian: Дмитрий Сибилёв; born 23 July 2000) is a Belarusian professional footballer who plays for Niva Dolbizno.
