= Vadim Milyutin =

Russian footballer

Personal information
- Full name: Vadim Dmitriyevich Milyutin
- Date of birth: 8 April 2002 (age 24)
- Place of birth: Nizhnebakanskaya, Russia
- Height: 1.84 m (6 ft 1/2 in)
- Position: Centre-back

Team information
- Current team: Niva Dolbizno
- Number: 4

Youth career
- Akademiya Futbola Krasnodar Kray

Senior career*
Years	Team	Apps	(Gls)
2019–2023	Sochi	1	(0)
2021–2022	→ Dynamo Brest (loan)	15	(1)
2022–2023	→ Tyumen (loan)	9	(0)
2023	Tyumen	0	(0)
2024	Arsenal Dzerzhinsk	7	(0)
2024–2025	Salyut Belgorod	6	(0)
2025	Murom	2	(0)
2026–	Niva Dolbizno	8	(0)
- * Club domestic league appearances and goals as of 6 July 2026

Vadim Dmitriyevich Milyutin (Russian: Вадим Дмитриевич Милютин; born 8 April 2002) is a Russian football player.

== Club career ==
He made his debut in the Russian Premier League for PFC Sochi on 19 June 2020 in a game against FC Rostov, replacing Ivan Novoseltsev in the 56th minute. FC Rostov was forced to field their Under-18 squad in that game as their main squad was quarantined after 6 players tested positive for COVID-19.

On 7 July 2023, Milyutin returned to Tyumen after playing for the club on loan in the previous season.
