= Aleksandr Bulychyov =

Belarusian professional footballer

Personal information
- Full name: Aleksandr Igorevich Bulychyov
- Date of birth: 19 November 1999 (age 26)
- Place of birth: Vitebsk, Belarus
- Height: 1.75 m (5 ft 9 in)
- Position: Midfielder

Team information
- Current team: Slonim-2017
- Number: 77

Youth career
- 2017–2020: Shakhtyor Soligorsk

Senior career*
Years	Team	Apps	(Gls)
2020–2021	Shakhtyor Soligorsk	1	(0)
2020	→ Gorodeya (loan)	3	(0)
2021	→ Vitebsk (loan)	0	(0)
2021	→ Energetik-BGU Minsk (loan)	12	(1)
2022	Dinamo Brest	13	(0)
2022	Torpedo Vladimir	12	(0)
2023	Maxline Vitebsk	11	(1)
2023	Dinamo Brest	4	(0)
2024–2025	Volna Pinsk	43	(6)
2025	Lida	12	(2)
2026–	Slonim-2017	11	(0)
- * Club domestic league appearances and goals as of 6 July 2026

Aleksandr Igorevich Bulychyov (Belarusian: Аляксандр Ігаравіч Булычоў; Russian: Александр Игоревич Булычёв; born 19 November 1999) is a Belarusian professional footballer who plays for Slonim-2017.

== Honors ==
Shakhtyor Soligorsk

- Belarusian Premier League champion: 2020
