= Tarasivka, Oleksandriia Raion, Kirovohrad Oblast =

Rural locality in Kirovohrad Oblast, Ukraine

Coordinates: 48°34′12″N 33°28′48″E

Tarasivka (Ukrainian: Тарасівка) is a small village about 70 miles (110 km) east of Kropyvnytskyi in Oleksandriia Raion, Kirovohrad Oblast (province) of southern Ukraine. It is located by the Lake Stepivka. Tarasivka belongs to Popelnaste rural hromada, one of the hromadas of Ukraine. The village is named for Taras Bulba.
