= Čegrane =

Čegrane Чегране Çegran
- Village
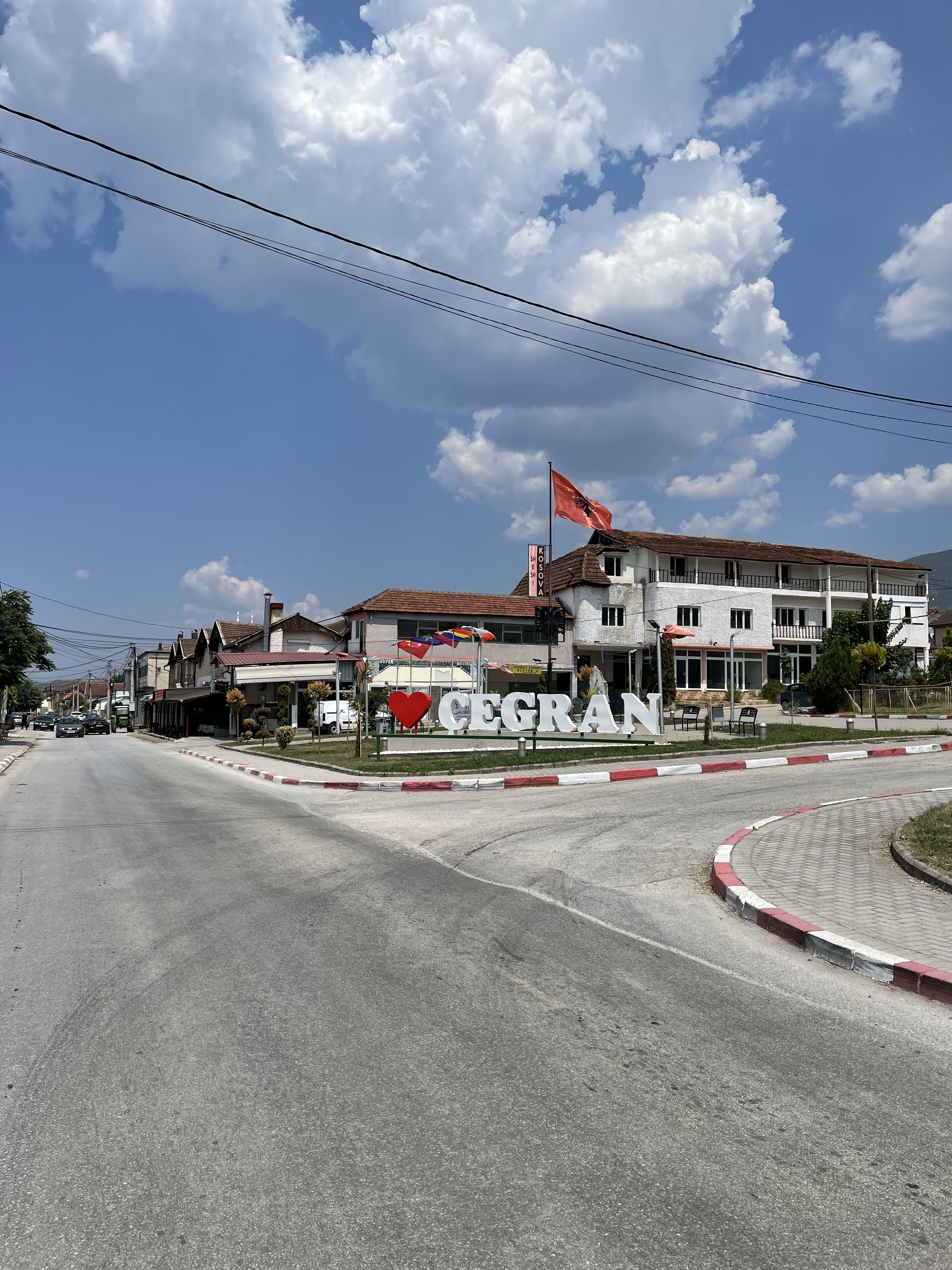
- Entrance of Čegrane

- Location within North Macedonia
- Coordinates: 41°50′20″N 20°58′32″E
- Country: North Macedonia
- Region: Polog
- Municipality: Gostivar

Population (2021)
  - Total: 4,022
- Time zone: UTC+1 (CET)
  - Summer (DST): UTC+2 (CEST)
- Postal code: 1237
- Area code: +389
- Car plates: GV

Čegrane (Macedonian: Чегране; Albanian: Çegran) is a village in the municipality of Gostivar, North Macedonia. The village lies approximately 7 kilometres (4.3 mi) east of the city of Gostivar. Prior to merging with Gostivar Municipality, Čegrane was the seat of Čegrane Municipality.

== History ==
=== Ottoman era ===
Čegrane is attested in the 1467/68 Ottoman tax registry (defter) for the Nahiyah of Kalkandelen. The village had a total of 15 Christian households, 1 widow and 1 bachelor.

The names are: Gjon Arbanas (t. Arnaut); Gjin, son of Arbanas; Nik-o, son of Don-li; Kraj-o, son of Dan; Brajk-o, son of Donçe; Kraj-o, son of Dançe.

At the beginning of the 19th century Čegrane was a predominantly Albanian village in Tetovo's Gostivarska Nahiya of the Ottoman Empire. According to the statistics of Vasil Kanchov (Macedonia. Ethnography and statistics), in 1900, Čegrane had 800 Muslim Albanian inhabitants. In 1913, the village came under the control of the Kingdom of Serbia along with the rest of Vardar Macedonia. According to the Russian Slavist Afanasij Selishchev in 1929, Čegrane was the center of municipality of five villages.

=== Kosovo conflict (1999): Refugee camp ===
During the Kosovo War, a massive makeshift camp was set up for ethnic Albanian refugees in Čegrane by the United Nations High Commissioner for Refugees, International Federation of Red Cross and Red Crescent Societies and local NGOs. The area had been used as a rubbish dump, but the tiers that had cut into the steep hillside were filled with rows of thousands of tents. It was managed by CARE, which initially expected 3,000 refugees. It was filled to capacity in a matter of days. It became the largest single camp in the entire crisis, housing over 43,000 people. First hand reports describe that the Čegrane camp "held 57,000 displaced and emotionally shattered people." They were provided with some humanitarian care, until safe passage was available back to Kosovo.

== Demographics ==
As of the 2021 census, Čegrane had 4,022 residents with the following ethnic composition:

- Albanians 3,832
- Persons for whom data are taken from administrative sources 188
- Others 2

According to Selishchev, the village had 234 houses with 1,364 Albanian inhabitants Albanians in 1929. According to the 2002 census, the village had a total of 6748 inhabitants. Ethnic groups in the village include:

- Albanians 6672
- Macedonians 2
- Bosniaks 1
- Others 73

According to the 1942 Albanian census, Čegrane was inhabited by 2171 Muslim Albanians.

== Sports ==
The local football club KF Arsimi plays in the Macedonian First Football League.
