= Tarasivka, Oleksandrivka settlement hromada, Kropyvnytskyi Raion, Kirovohrad Oblast =

Rural locality in Kirovohrad Oblast, Ukraine

Tarasivka Тарасівка
- Location in Ukraine
- Coordinates: 48°46′30″N 32°12′15″E
- Country: Ukraine
- Oblast: Kirovohrad Oblast
- Raion: Kropyvnytskyi Raion
- Elevation: 173 m (568 ft)

Population (2001)
  - Total: 24
- Time zone: UTC+2 (EET)
  - Summer (DST): UTC+3 (EEST)
- Postal code: 27345
- Area code: +380 5242

Tarasivka (Ukrainian: Тарасівка) is a village in Kropyvnytskyi Raion, Kirovohrad Oblast, Ukraine. It belongs to Oleksandrivka settlement hromada, one of the hromadas of Ukraine. The village has a population of 24.

Until 18 July 2020, Tarasivka belonged to Oleksandrivka Raion. The raion was abolished in July 2020 as part of the administrative reform of Ukraine, which reduced the number of raions in Kirovohrad Oblast to four. The territory of Oleksandrivka Raion was merged into Kropyvnytskyi Raion.
