= FC BATE-2 Borisov =

BATE-2 Borisov
- Founded: 2024
- Ground: City Stadium, Borisov
- Capacity: 5,402
- Manager: Dmitry Dergay
- League: Belarusian First League
- 2025: Belarusian First League, 8th of 18
Home colours	Away colours

FC BATE-2 Borisov is a football team from Borisov, Belarus, currently playing in the Belarusian First League. The team is a farm club of FC BATE Borisov.

== History ==
The club was founded in 2024 as vessel for reserve players of BATE Borisov after the abolition of Belarusian Premier League Reserves Championship. BATE-2 were admitted to Belarusian First League bypassing the Second League, as BATE reserves finished in the top 3 in the final season of Reserves League.

== Current squad ==
As of 1 September 2026

Note: Flags indicate national team as defined under FIFA eligibility rules; some limited exceptions apply. Players may hold more than one non-FIFA nationality.

No.	Pos.	Nation	Player
3	MF	BLR	Yevgeny Shakhnovich
4	DF	BLR	Nazar Shcherbakov
5	MF	BLR	Aleksey Apanasevich
6	MF	BLR	Maksim Karpovich
7	MF	BLR	Roman Aliyev
8	MF	BLR	Platon Kolosovskiy
9	MF	RUS	Taras Gagloev
10	MF	BLR	Tigran Sarkisyan
11	FW	BLR	Marat Titov
14	MF	BLR	Maskim Telesh
16	GK	BLR	Mikhail Klyakin
17	MF	BLR	Ales Sakhonchik
18	MF	BLR	Kirill Apanasevich
21	MF	BLR	Ignat Kuimov
22	DF	BLR	Matvey Gavrilov
24	FW	BLR	Maksim Kunsky
27	DF	BLR	Dmitry Karshakevich
35	GK	RUS	Aleksandr Ryabinkin
45	FW	BLR	Yegor Nikolayev
47	DF	BLR	Yegor Makhnach
66	MF	BLR	Valeriy Kisel

No.	Pos.	Nation	Player
68	MF	BLR	Yelisey Starikov
77	DF	BLR	Yaroslav Kuzmenok
—	DF	BLR	Yegor Chuyevskiy
—	DF	BLR	Pavel Dubovsky
—	MF	BLR	Yegor Feskov
—	MF	BLR	Gleb Glushko
—	FW	BLR	Yegor Grivenev
—	DF	BLR	Marat Litvinov
—	MF	BLR	Ivan Mikhnyuk
—	MF	BLR	Gleb Potapyonok
—	MF	BLR	Yegor Rusakov
—	DF	BLR	Maksim Sakuta
—	GK	BLR	Aleksey Shilak
—	MF	BLR	Artyom Shreyn
—	MF	BLR	Yan Shumskiy
—	GK	BLR	Arseniy Skopets
—	GK	BLR	Danila Sokol
—	FW	BLR	Aleksandr Sudnik
—	MF	BLR	Matvey Tolkach
—	FW	BLR	Vladislav Yatskevich
—	GK	BLR	Vitaly Zhurba
