= Martin Artyukh =

Belarusian footballer

Personal information
- Date of birth: 6 May 1996 (age 30)
- Place of birth: Volkovysk, Grodno Oblast, Belarus
- Height: 1.73 m (5 ft 8 in)
- Position: Midfielder

Team information
- Current team: Baranovichi
- Number: 77

Senior career*
Years	Team	Apps	(Gls)
2015–2017	Smena Volkovysk		
2018	Slonim-2017	14	(2)
2018–2019	Gorodeya	7	(0)
2020	Slonim-2017	21	(2)
2021	Baranovichi	28	(11)
2022–2023	Isloch Minsk Raion	20	(3)
2023–2024	Dnepr Mogilev	30	(9)
2024–	Baranovichi	56	(29)
- * Club domestic league appearances and goals as of 3 July 2026

Martin Artyukh (Belarusian: Марцін Арцюх; Russian: Мартин Артюх; born 6 May 1996) is a Belarusian footballer who plays for Baranovichi.
