= Pavel Pampukha =

Belarusian footballer

Personal information
- Date of birth: 26 June 1995 (age 31)
- Place of birth: Brest, Belarus
- Height: 1.87 m (6 ft 2 in)
- Position: Forward

Team information
- Current team: Niva Dolbizno
- Number: 29

Youth career
- 2009–2014: Dinamo Brest

Senior career*
Years	Team	Apps	(Gls)
2015–2016	Dinamo Brest	7	(0)
2015	→ Kobrin (loan)	10	(1)
2016	Baranovichi	9	(4)
2017	Sparta Brodnica	14	(6)
2018–2019	Rukh Brest	47	(27)
2020	Dinamo Malorita	21	(19)
2021–	Niva Dolbizno	146	(118)
- * Club domestic league appearances and goals as of 6 July 2026

Pavel Pampukha (Belarusian: Павел Пампуха; Russian: Павел Пампуха; born 26 June 1995) is a Belarusian professional footballer who plays for Niva Dolbizno.
