= FC Dinamo-2 Minsk =

Dinamo-2 Minsk
- Full name: FC Dinamo-2 Minsk
- Founded: 2000
- Ground: Dinamo-Yuni Stadium, Minsk
- Capacity: 4,500
- Manager: Sergey Yaromko
- League: Belarusian First League
- 2025: Belarusian First League, 13th of 18
Home colours	Away colours

FC Dinamo-2 Minsk (Belarusian: Дынама-2 Мінск, Dynama-2 Minsk; Russian: Динамо-2 Минск, Dinamo-2 Minsk) is a Belarusian football club based in Minsk.

== History ==
The club serves as a farm club of Dinamo Minsk, giving the club's young players an opportunity for adult competition matches. The club was active in Belarusian Second League during 2000–2002 and again in 2011–2012. In 2002 the club played as Dinamo-BNTU Minsk, reflecting a partnership with Belarusian National Technical University.

There has been two other generations of Dinamo-2 team. The earliest one was a Soviet-era team which occasionally played in Belarusian SSR league. The second one was the 1992 club which, after winning the debut season of the Belarusian First League, the team got promoted to the top flight and split from Dinamo to form Belarus Minsk (later renamed to Dinamo-93 Minsk).

In 2024, after the abolishment of the Belarusian Premier League Reserves Championship, the club was restarted and accepted to Belarusian First League.

== Current squad ==
As of 8 September 2026

Note: Flags indicate national team as defined under FIFA eligibility rules; some limited exceptions apply. Players may hold more than one non-FIFA nationality.

No.	Pos.	Nation	Player
1	GK	BLR	Aleksandr Aleksandrovich
2	DF	BLR	Matvey Dubatovka
3	MF	BLR	Mark Nizovtsev
4	DF	BLR	Dmitriy Leontyuk
5	DF	BLR	Vladislav Kibak
7	FW	BLR	Nikita Titov
8	MF	BLR	Artem Grabtsevich
9	FW	BLR	Andrey Lutskovich
10	MF	BLR	Sergey Zhivushko
11	FW	BLR	Anatoly Yastochkin
12	GK	BLR	Danila Radkevich
13	MF	BLR	Nikita Sanko
14	DF	BLR	Matvey Chernyavsky
15	MF	BLR	Ivan Bachauskas
16	MF	BLR	Gleb Sereda
17	DF	BLR	Aleksandr Penkrat
18	MF	BLR	Gleb Drozd
19	FW	BLR	Dmitry Degtyarenko

No.	Pos.	Nation	Player
20	MF	BLR	Timofey Gudach
21	DF	BLR	Stepan Zhigimont
22	MF	BLR	Nikita Kolesnikovich
23	FW	BLR	Nazar Raptunovich
24	FW	BLR	Artur Chumak
25	MF	BLR	Vladislav Voronin
—	DF	BLR	Mikhail Aleksandrov
—	MF	BLR	Vladislav Beynya
—	GK	BLR	Kirill Butevich
—	FW	BLR	Danila Leonenko
—	DF	BLR	Fyodor Pobortsev
—	GK	BLR	Ivan Shimakovich
—	MF	BLR	Artyom Sokolovsky
—	MF	BLR	Svyatoslav Tankushin
—	FW	BLR	Igor Yurevich
—	MF	BLR	Artur Zablotski
—	DF	BLR	Roman Zdukhov
—	DF	BLR	Aleksey Zhechko
