= FC Torpedo-BelAZ-2 Zhodino =

Torpedo-BelAZ-2 Zhodino
- Founded: 2024
- Ground: Torpedo Stadium, Zhodino
- Capacity: 6,524
- Manager: Valentin Mikheyev
- League: Belarusian Second League
Home colours	Away colours

FC Torpedo-BelAZ-2 Zhodino is a football team from Zhodino, Belarus, currently playing in the Belarusian Second League. The team is a farm club of FC Torpedo-BelAZ Zhodino.

== History ==
The club was founded in 2024 as an outfit for reserve players of Torpedo-BelAZ Zhodino after the abolition of Belarusian Premier League Reserves Championship. Torpedo-BelAZ-2 were admitted to Belarusian First League bypassing the Second League, as Torpedo-BelAZ reserves finished in the top 3 in the final season of Reserves League.

== Current squad ==
As of February 2025

Note: Flags indicate national team as defined under FIFA eligibility rules; some limited exceptions apply. Players may hold more than one non-FIFA nationality.

No.	Pos.	Nation	Player
1	GK	BLR	Nazar Chizh
3	DF	BLR	Ihar Burko
4	MF	BLR	Pavel Zakharaw
5	DF	BLR	Matvey Pritsker
6	MF	BLR	Gleb Yarotskiy
7	MF	BLR	Roman Zhelezny
8	MF	BLR	Mikhail Ladutko
9	FW	BLR	Yegor Furs
10	MF	BLR	Vladislav Skavpnev
11	MF	BLR	Ivan Siwkow
12	GK	BLR	Makar Maslenikov

No.	Pos.	Nation	Player
14	MF	BLR	Konstantin Konchalenko
17	FW	BLR	Kirill Nebyshinets
18	MF	BLR	Artem Sidorik
19	DF	BLR	Zakhar Baranok
20	FW	BLR	Yahor Yahoraw
22	MF	BLR	Konstantin Bogdanovich
—	MF	BLR	Alyaksandr Famin
—	FW	BLR	Dzyanis Nikalayew
—	DF	BLR	Vladislav Melko
—	MF	BLR	Timofey Sharkovskiy
—	MF	BLR	Gleb Mikhaylov
