= ABFF U-19 =

Belarusian association football club

ABFF U-19 (Russian: АБФФ U-19) is an association football club based in Minsk, Belarus.

== History ==
ABFF U-19 was founded in 2024 and dissolved in 2025.
