= FC Niva Dolbizno =

Belarusian football club

Niva Dolbizno
- Full name: Football Club Niva Dolbizno
- Founded: 2005; 21 years ago
- Ground: City Stadium, Dolbizno
- Chairman: Aleksandr Kazantsev
- Head Coach: Pavel Yawseenka
- League: Belarusian First League
- 2025: Belarusian First League, 7th of 18
- Website: fcniva.by

FC Niva Dolbizno is a Belarusian football club based in Dolbizno, Brest Oblast. The club currently play in Belarusian First League, the second tier of Belarusian football.

== History ==
Niva Dolbizno founded in 2005. Since foundation and until 2020 the club played at the amateur level in Brest Oblast league. In 2021 Niva joined Belarusian Second League. After winning the 2022 season in the Second League, the team got promoted to Belarusian First League in 2023.

== Current squad ==
As of 1 September 2026

Note: Flags indicate national team as defined under FIFA eligibility rules; some limited exceptions apply. Players may hold more than one non-FIFA nationality.

No.	Pos.	Nation	Player
1	GK	BLR	Ruslan Belov
3	DF	BLR	Maksim Druchik
4	DF	RUS	Vadim Milyutin
7	FW	BLR	Dmitry Galuza
8	MF	BLR	Dmitry Sibilev
9	MF	BLR	Artem Kuratnik
10	MF	BLR	Vladislav Dybin
12	GK	BLR	Nikita Dovnar
15	MF	BLR	Igor Monich
18	DF	BLR	Uladzimir Shcherba
20	DF	BLR	Aleksandr Martysevich (on loan from Dinamo Minsk)
21	MF	BLR	Nikolay Leshkevich

No.	Pos.	Nation	Player
23	MF	BLR	Dmitry Fedortsov
26	DF	BLR	Sergey Kontsevoy
29	FW	BLR	Pavel Pampukha
35	GK	BLR	Danila Kashtelyan
41	DF	BLR	Aleksey Tkhagolegov
47	MF	BLR	Vladimir Skomarovsky
62	FW	BLR	Mikhail Gordeychuk
69	MF	BLR	Yevgeny Mashagin
77	DF	BLR	Vladislav Shubovich
88	DF	BLR	Roman Kozel
98	DF	BLR	Aleksandr Karpuk
99	MF	BLR	Valentin Bondarenko (on loan from Slavia Mozyr)
