= Belarusian Premier League Reserves Championship =

Belarusian Premier League Reserves Championship was an annual competition for the reserve teams of Belarusian Premier League clubs. Current: 2020 Belarusian Premier League Reserves Championship

== History ==
The competition was established in 2001. Prior to 2001, most of Belarusian Premier League clubs had their reserve teams or affiliated farm clubs playing in lower divisions of Belarus football league system. After the reserve league creation, all Premier League clubs created the new reserve teams to participate in it, and most of old reserve teams were folded, either immediately or in next several years. Several Premier League clubs with developed youth system still continue running separate farm clubs in the First or Second League. As of 2014, only one such team (Vitebsk-2) is active.

== Format ==
The format of each season of the league is virtually identical to that of respective Premier League season. There is no promotion or relegation depending on the season's final table. Instead, only the reserve teams of current Premier League members are admitted for each season. Match schedule of each season follows closely the calendar of Premier League, except all games are played one day earlier than seniors' game.

== Belarusian Reserves Cup ==
For the 2013 and 2014 seasons, the Premier League format included two phases: 12 teams in a double round-robin league followed by a Championship playoff group and Relegation playoff group. The same groups were used for the Reserves Cup tournament. Winners of both groups played a final game at the end of the season.

== Winners ==
Season	Winner	Runner-up	Third place
2001	Gomel	Torpedo-MAZ Minsk	BATE Borisov
2002	Dnepr-Transmash Mogilev	Dinamo Minsk	Torpedo-MAZ Minsk
2003	Torpedo Zhodino	Torpedo-SKA Minsk	BATE Borisov
2004	Dinamo Minsk	Dinamo Brest	Torpedo-SKA Minsk
2005	Dinamo Minsk	BATE Borisov	Shakhtyor Soligorsk
2006	Dinamo Minsk	BATE Borisov	Dinamo Brest
2007	Dinamo Minsk	Neman Grodno	Gomel
2008	Shakhtyor Soligorsk	Lokomotiv Minsk	BATE Borisov
2009	Dinamo Minsk	Torpedo Zhodino	Naftan Novopolotsk
2010	Dinamo Minsk	Shakhtyor Soligorsk	Naftan Novopolotsk
2011	BATE Borisov	Dinamo Minsk	Gomel
2012	Gomel	Dinamo Minsk	Shakhtyor Soligorsk
2013	Shakhtyor Soligorsk	BATE Borisov	Dinamo Minsk
2014	Dinamo Minsk	Gomel	BATE Borisov
2015	Minsk	BATE Borisov	Naftan Novopolotsk
2016	Minsk	Shakhtyor Soligorsk	BATE Borisov
2017	Shakhtyor Soligorsk	Dinamo Brest	Dinamo Minsk
2018	Dinamo Minsk	Dinamo Brest	BATE Borisov
2019	BATE Borisov	Dinamo Minsk	Minsk
2020	Dinamo Minsk	Minsk	Shakhtyor Soligorsk
2021	Dinamo Minsk	BATE Borisov	Shakhtyor Soligorsk

Teams	Champion	Runner-up	Third place
Dinamo Minsk	10 (2004, 2005, 2006, 2007, 2009, 2010, 2014, 2018, 2020, 2021)	4 (2002, 2011, 2012, 2019)	3 (2013, 2017, 2022)
Shakhtyor Soligorsk	3 (2008, 2013, 2017)	2 (2010, 2016)	4 (2005, 2012, 2020, 2021)
Gomel	2 (2001, 2012)	1 (2014)	2 (2007, 2011)
Minsk	2 (2015, 2016)	1 (2020)	1 (2019)
BATE Borisov	2 (2011, 2019)	5 (2005, 2006, 2013, 2015, 2021)	6 (2001, 2003, 2008, 2014, 2016, 2018)
Torpedo-BelAZ Zhodino	1 (2003)	1 (2009)	0
Dnepr Mogilev	1 (2002)	0	0
Dinamo Brest	0	3 (2004, 2017, 2018)	1 (2006)
Torpedo-SKA Minsk	0	2 (2001, 2003)	2 (2002, 2004)
Neman Grodno	0	1 (2007)	0
Lokomotiv Minsk	0	1 (2008)	0
Naftan Novopolotsk	0	0	3 (2009, 2010, 2015)

== Cup Finals ==
Year	Winners	Runners-up
2013	Shakhtyor Soligorsk	Minsk
2014	Minsk	Gomel
