= FC Slonim-2017 =

Slonim-2017
- Full name: Football Club Slonim-2017
- Founded: 2010 (Beltransgaz Slonim); 2013 (FC Slonim)
- Ground: Yunost Stadium, Slonim
- Capacity: 2,220
- Manager: Sergey Podretskiy
- League: Belarusian First League
- 2025: Belarusian First League, 18th of 18
Home colours	Away colours

Slonim-2017 is a Belarusian football club based in Slonim, Grodno Region.

== History ==
The team was founded in 2013 as a result of merger between Beltransgaz Slonim and Kommunalnik Slonim. The new team is considered a successor to Beltransgaz. It inherited entire Beltransgaz squad with addition of a few Kommunalnik players, as well as Beltransgaz training facilities and a stadium previously shared by both teams. As Beltransgaz originally earned a spot in Belarusian First League for 2013 season, the spot is transferred to the new team. The merger was also necessary due to Beltransgaz's type of ownership which would've prevented them from obtaining a First League license.

In 2017, the club was renamed to Slonim-2017.

== Current squad ==
As of 1 September 2026

Note: Flags indicate national team as defined under FIFA eligibility rules; some limited exceptions apply. Players may hold more than one non-FIFA nationality.

No.	Pos.	Nation	Player
1	GK	BLR	Denis Miskevich
2	DF	BLR	Kirill Krutorozhkin
3	DF	BLR	Taysir Adamchik
4	FW	BLR	Nikita Chuyko
5	DF	BLR	Dmitriy Vechorko
6	DF	BLR	Danila Garbuz
7	MF	BLR	Maksim Klunok
8	DF	RUS	Roman Mushulov
9	FW	BLR	Arseny Zhukovsky
10	FW	RUS	Pavel Alenchev
11	FW	RUS	Marat Dzukaev
12	MF	RUS	Ivan Syomin
13	DF	BLR	Artur Chuyko
15	MF	BLR	Stepan Gomonov
16	GK	BLR	Dmitry Say

No.	Pos.	Nation	Player
17	MF	BLR	Arseny Sokol
18	MF	BLR	Maksim Tkatsevich
19	MF	BLR	Aleksandr Konev
20	DF	BLR	Artyom Glotko
21	FW	RUS	Vadim Shcherbakov
37	MF	BLR	Andrey Bolvan
44	GK	BLR	Andrey Agapov
76	DF	BLR	Denis Kutsko
77	MF	BLR	Aleksandr Bulychyov
99	FW	BLR	Marat Kalinchenko
—	FW	BLR	Viktor Berg
—	MF	BLR	Ivan Furmanov
—	FW	BLR	Alyaksandr Kuzin
—	DF	BLR	Artur Starovoytov
—	DF	BLR	Aleksandr Turuk
