= 2023 FIFA U-17 World Cup squads =

List of all the national team squads that participated in the 2023 FIFA U-17 World Cup

The following is a list of all the national team squads that participated in the 2023 FIFA U-17 World Cup.

Each team had to name a squad of 21 players (three of whom had to be goalkeepers) by the FIFA deadline. All players of its representative team had to have been born on or after 1 January 2006. The age listed for each player is as of 10 November 2023, the first day of the tournament. Those marked in bold had been capped with the senior national team.

== Group A ==
=== Indonesia ===
Indonesia announced their squad on 1 November 2023.

Head coach: Bima Sakti

No.	Pos.	Player	Date of birth (age)	Club
1	GK	Ikram Algiffari	6 January 2006 (aged 17)	(Football Association of Indonesia) Semen Padang
2	DF	Rizdjar Nurviat	2 January 2006 (aged 17)	(Football Association of Indonesia) Borneo Samarinda
3	DF	Tonci Ramandei	12 March 2006 (aged 17)	(Football Association of Indonesia) PPLP Papua
4	DF	Andre Pangestu	22 January 2006 (aged 17)	(Football Association of Indonesia) Bali United
5	MF	Achmad Zidan	22 October 2006 (aged 17)	(Football Association of Indonesia) PSS Sleman
6	MF	Hanif Ramadhan	2 November 2006 (aged 17)	(Football Association of Indonesia) Cipta Cendikia
7	MF	Figo Dennis	28 April 2006 (aged 17)	(Football Association of Indonesia) Persija Jakarta
8	FW	**Arkhan Kaka**	2 September 2007 (aged 16)	(Football Association of Indonesia) Persis Solo
9	MF	Kafiatur Rizky	17 July 2006 (aged 17)	(Football Association of Indonesia) Dewa United
10	MF	Ji Da-bin	3 March 2006 (aged 17)	(Football Association of Indonesia) ASIOP
11	FW	Riski Afrisal	25 April 2006 (aged 17)	(Football Association of Indonesia) Madura United
12	DF	Welber Jardim	25 April 2007 (aged 16)	(Brazilian Football Confederation) São Paulo
13	GK	Andrika Fathir	17 February 2006 (aged 17)	(Football Association of Indonesia) Borneo Samarinda
14	DF	Sulthan Zaky	23 March 2006 (aged 17)	(Football Association of Indonesia) PSM Makassar
15	GK	Rifky Tofani	22 February 2006 (aged 17)	(Football Association of Indonesia) PPOP DKI Jakarta
16	FW	Amar Brkić	11 June 2007 (aged 16)	(German Football Association) Hoffenheim
17	FW	Nabil Asyura	2 July 2006 (aged 17)	(Football Association of Indonesia) PSP Padang
18	FW	Jehan Pahlevi	18 March 2006 (aged 17)	(Football Association of Indonesia) Persija Jakarta
19	FW	Aulia Rahman	20 August 2006 (aged 17)	(Football Association of Indonesia) Persita Tangerang
20	DF	Habil Akbar	25 May 2006 (aged 17)	(Football Association of Indonesia) PPLP Jawa Tengah
21	DF	Iqbal Gwijangge (captain)	29 August 2006 (aged 17)	(Football Association of Indonesia) Barito Putera

=== Ecuador ===
Ecuador named their squad on 19 October 2023.

Head coach: Diego Martínez

No.	Pos.	Player	Date of birth (age)	Club
1	GK	Cristhian Loor	9 March 2006 (aged 17)	(Ecuadorian Football Federation) Independiente del Valle
2	DF	Jair Collahuazo	21 January 2006 (aged 17)	(Ecuadorian Football Federation) Emelec
3	DF	Ivis Davis	28 January 2007 (aged 16)	(Ecuadorian Football Federation) LDU Quito
4	DF	Jesús Polo	1 January 2007 (aged 16)	(Ecuadorian Football Federation) LDU Quito
5	MF	Jairo Reyes	7 January 2006 (aged 17)	(Ecuadorian Football Federation) Independiente del Valle
6	DF	Elkin Ruiz	27 May 2006 (aged 17)	(Ecuadorian Football Federation) Independiente del Valle
7	FW	**Keny Arroyo**	14 February 2006 (aged 17)	(Ecuadorian Football Federation) Independiente del Valle
8	MF	Geremy de Jesús	16 September 2006 (aged 17)	(Ecuadorian Football Federation) Independiente del Valle
9	FW	Erick Zambrano	14 November 2007 (aged 15)	(Ecuadorian Football Federation) Orense
10	FW	Michael Bermúdez	13 January 2006 (aged 17)	(Ecuadorian Football Federation) LDU Quito
11	FW	**Allen Obando**	13 June 2006 (aged 17)	(Ecuadorian Football Federation) Barcelona SC
12	GK	Ariel Bao	10 July 2006 (aged 17)	(Ecuadorian Football Federation) LDU Quito
13	MF	Rooney Troya	20 February 2006 (aged 17)	(Ecuadorian Football Federation) Universidad Católica (Q)
14	FW	Isaac Sánchez	8 June 2006 (aged 17)	(Ecuadorian Football Federation) Universidad Católica (Q)
15	MF	Juan Sebastián Rodríguez	27 March 2006 (aged 17)	(Ecuadorian Football Federation) LDU Quito
16	FW	Yandri Vásquez	1 August 2006 (aged 17)	(Ecuadorian Football Federation) Independiente del Valle
17	DF	Yorkaeff Caicedo	3 May 2006 (aged 17)	(Ecuadorian Football Federation) Cuniburo
18	DF	Snaider Demera	5 August 2006 (aged 17)	(Ecuadorian Football Federation) Barcelona SC
19	DF	Anibal Gómez	22 January 2006 (aged 17)	(Ecuadorian Football Federation) Independiente del Valle
20	GK	Josué Méndez	12 March 2006 (aged 17)	(Ecuadorian Football Federation) Deportivo Cuenca
21	FW	Santiago Sánchez	30 August 2006 (aged 17)	(Ecuadorian Football Federation) Independiente del Valle

=== Panama ===
Panama named their squad on 1 November 2023.

Head coach: Mike Stump

No.	Pos.	Player	Date of birth (age)	Club
1	GK	Manuel Romero	4 April 2006 (aged 17)	(Panamanian Football Federation) Árabe Unido
2	DF	Juriel Nereida	4 January 2006 (aged 17)	(Panamanian Football Federation) Árabe Unido
3	DF	**Martín Krug**	9 July 2006 (aged 17)	(Royal Spanish Football Federation) Levante
4	DF	Giancarlos García	4 February 2006 (aged 17)	(Panamanian Football Federation) Árabe Unido
5	DF	Juan Hall	9 March 2006 (aged 17)	(Panamanian Football Federation) Academy Champions
6	MF	Anel Ryce	6 July 2006 (aged 17)	(Panamanian Football Federation) Plaza Amador
7	FW	Kevin Walder	13 April 2006 (aged 17)	(Panamanian Football Federation) Plaza Amador
8	MF	Aldair Marta	6 September 2006 (aged 17)	(United States Soccer Federation) Silicon Valley SA
9	FW	Frederick Krug	9 July 2006 (aged 17)	(Royal Spanish Football Federation) Patacona
10	MF	Éric Moreno	28 March 2006 (aged 17)	(Panamanian Football Federation) Universitario
11	MF	Oldemar Castillo	5 January 2006 (aged 17)	(Panamanian Football Federation) Sporting San Miguelito
12	GK	Said David	1 April 2006 (aged 17)	(Panamanian Football Federation) UMECIT
13	DF	**Érick Díaz**	4 March 2006 (aged 17)	(Panamanian Football Federation) Tauro
14	DF	Juan Jiménez	4 May 2006 (aged 17)	(Panamanian Football Federation) Plaza Amador
15	MF	Joshua Pierre	9 March 2006 (aged 17)	(Panamanian Football Federation) Plaza Amador
16	MF	Jael Pierre	5 October 2006 (aged 17)	(Panamanian Football Federation) Plaza Amador
17	FW	Luis Gaitán	8 August 2006 (aged 17)	(Panamanian Football Federation) San Francisco
18	MF	Héctor Ríos	6 January 2006 (aged 17)	(Panamanian Football Federation) Universitario
19	DF	Kahir Tovares	6 May 2006 (aged 17)	(Panamanian Football Federation) Udelas
20	MF	Ernesto Gómez	13 August 2007 (aged 16)	(Panamanian Football Federation) Universitario
21	GK	Alberto Ruiz	19 February 2007 (aged 16)	(Panamanian Football Federation) Tauro

=== Morocco ===
Morocco named a preliminary squad of 25 players on 23 October 2023. They announced the final squad on 2 November 2023.

Head coach: Saïd Chiba

No.	Pos.	Player	Date of birth (age)	Club
1	GK	Taha Benrhozil	18 June 2006 (aged 17)	(Royal Moroccan Football Federation) Mohammed VI Football Academy
2	DF	Hamza Koutoune	17 September 2006 (aged 17)	(Royal Moroccan Football Federation) Mohammed VI Football Academy
3	DF	Fouad Zahouani	18 April 2006 (aged 17)	(Royal Moroccan Football Federation) Mohammed VI Football Academy
4	MF	Ayoub Chaikhoun	22 January 2006 (aged 17)	(German Football Association) Eintracht Frankfurt
5	DF	**Abdelhamid Aït Boudlal**	16 April 2006 (aged 17)	(Royal Moroccan Football Federation) Mohammed VI Football Academy
6	MF	Mehdi Akoumi	5 May 2006 (aged 17)	(Royal Moroccan Football Federation) Hassania Agadir
7	FW	Anas Alaoui	20 April 2006 (aged 17)	(German Football Association) Eintracht Frankfurt
8	MF	Adam Boufandar	11 August 2006 (aged 17)	(Italian Football Federation) Juventus
9	FW	Nassim Azaouzi	31 March 2006 (aged 17)	(Royal Belgian Football Association) Anderlecht
10	MF	Imran Nazih	25 January 2006 (aged 17)	(Royal Dutch Football Association) Volendam
11	FW	Zakaria Ouazane	24 September 2006 (aged 17)	(Royal Dutch Football Association) Ajax
12	GK	Hamza Jlid	9 December 2006 (aged 16)	(United Arab Emirates Football Association) Shabab Al Ahli
13	DF	Saifdine Chlaghmo	27 January 2006 (aged 17)	(Royal Moroccan Football Federation) AS FAR
14	DF	Yasser El Aissati	12 June 2006 (aged 17)	(Royal Dutch Football Association) Ajax
15	DF	Naoufel El Hannach	7 December 2006 (aged 16)	(French Football Federation) Paris Saint-Germain
16	FW	Ayman Ennair	6 April 2006 (aged 17)	(Royal Moroccan Football Federation) FUS Rabat
17	MF	Abdelhamid Maali	16 March 2006 (aged 17)	(Royal Moroccan Football Federation) IR Tanger
18	DF	Mohamed Hamony	5 August 2006 (aged 17)	(French Football Federation) Le Havre
19	DF	Ismaïl Bakhty	29 November 2006 (aged 16)	(Royal Moroccan Football Federation) AS FAR
20	MF	Mohamed Katiba	1 March 2006 (aged 17)	(Royal Moroccan Football Federation) Hassania Agadir
21	GK	Amine Ezzarhouni	29 March 2006 (aged 17)	(French Football Federation) Lille

== Group B ==
=== Spain ===
Spain named their squad on 24 October 2023.

Head coach: José Lana

No.	Pos.	Player	Date of birth (age)	Club
1	GK	Raúl Jiménez	16 February 2006 (aged 17)	(Royal Spanish Football Federation) Valencia
2	DF	Héctor Fort	2 August 2006 (aged 17)	(Royal Spanish Football Federation) Barcelona
3	DF	Dani Muñoz	19 July 2006 (aged 17)	(Royal Spanish Football Federation) Atlético Madrid
4	DF	Jon Martín	23 April 2006 (aged 17)	(Royal Spanish Football Federation) Real Sociedad
5	DF	**Pau Cubarsí**	22 January 2007 (aged 16)	(Royal Spanish Football Federation) Barcelona
6	MF	Pau Prim	22 February 2006 (aged 17)	(Royal Spanish Football Federation) Barcelona
7	FW	Pablo López	27 March 2006 (aged 17)	(Royal Spanish Football Federation) Valencia
8	MF	Roberto Martín	12 August 2006 (aged 17)	(Royal Spanish Football Federation) Real Madrid
9	FW	Marc Guiu	4 January 2006 (aged 17)	(Royal Spanish Football Federation) Barcelona
10	MF	Juan Hernández	21 July 2007 (aged 16)	(Royal Spanish Football Federation) Barcelona
11	FW	Peio Huestamendia	8 November 2006 (aged 17)	(Royal Spanish Football Federation) Athletic Bilbao
12	FW	Igor Oyono	7 February 2008 (aged 15)	(Royal Spanish Football Federation) Villarreal
13	GK	Fran Árbol	30 June 2006 (aged 17)	(Royal Spanish Football Federation) Granada
14	DF	Izan Merino	15 April 2006 (aged 17)	(Royal Spanish Football Federation) Málaga
15	DF	Andrés Cuenca	11 June 2007 (aged 16)	(Royal Spanish Football Federation) Barcelona
16	MF	**Marc Bernal**	26 May 2007 (aged 16)	(Royal Spanish Football Federation) Barcelona
17	DF	Óscar Mesa	3 July 2006 (aged 17)	(Royal Spanish Football Federation) Real Madrid
18	MF	Quim Junyent	25 March 2007 (aged 16)	(Royal Spanish Football Federation) Barcelona
19	FW	Daniel Yáñez	28 March 2007 (aged 16)	(Royal Spanish Football Federation) Real Madrid
20	MF	Paulo Iago	10 April 2007 (aged 16)	(Royal Spanish Football Federation) Real Madrid
21	GK	Marcos González	10 January 2006 (aged 17)	(Royal Spanish Football Federation) Celta Vigo

=== Canada ===
Canada named their squad on 2 November 2023.

Head coach: Andrew Olivieri

No.	Pos.	Player	Date of birth (age)	Club
1	GK	Nathaniel Abraham	23 April 2007 (aged 16)	(Canadian Soccer Association) Toronto FC Academy
2	DF	Theo Rigopoulos	29 October 2006 (aged 17)	(Canadian Soccer Association) Toronto FC II
3	DF	Gaël de Montigny	16 March 2006 (aged 17)	(Canadian Soccer Association) CF Montréal Academy
4	MF	Alessandro Biello	7 April 2006 (aged 17)	(Canadian Soccer Association) CF Montréal U23
5	DF	Chimere Omeze	2 June 2006 (aged 17)	(Canadian Soccer Association) Toronto FC Academy
6	DF	Lazar Stefanovic	10 August 2006 (aged 17)	(Canadian Soccer Association) Toronto FC II
7	FW	Taryck Tahid	21 April 2007 (aged 16)	(Canadian Soccer Association) Vancouver FC
8	MF	Jeevan Badwal	11 March 2006 (aged 17)	(Canadian Soccer Association) Vancouver Whitecaps FC 2
9	FW	Antoni Klukowski	2 April 2007 (aged 16)	(Polish Football Association) Pogoń Szczecin
10	MF	Philip Igbinobaro	5 January 2006 (aged 17)	(Canadian Soccer Association) Toronto FC Academy
11	FW	Kevaughn Tavernier	24 February 2006 (aged 17)	(Canadian Soccer Association) Forge FC
12	DF	Aidan Fong	28 March 2006 (aged 17)	(Canadian Soccer Association) Vancouver Whitecaps FC Academy
13	DF	Richard Chukwu	25 February 2008 (aged 15)	(Canadian Soccer Association) Toronto FC Academy
14	MF	Tyler Londono	29 August 2006 (aged 17)	(Canadian Soccer Association) Toronto FC Academy
15	DF	Victor Fung	13 August 2007 (aged 16)	(United States Soccer Federation) Inter Miami Academy
16	GK	Dominic Kantorowicz	26 April 2008 (aged 15)	(Canadian Soccer Association) Toronto FC Academy
17	DF	Étienne Godin	1 February 2006 (aged 17)	(Canadian Soccer Association) CF Montréal Academy
18	GK	Alexander O'Brien	23 May 2006 (aged 17)	(Canadian Soccer Association) Toronto FC Academy
19	FW	Erik Pop	30 January 2006 (aged 17)	(German Football Association) Karlsruher SC U19
20	DF	Lino Aklil	16 March 2006 (aged 17)	(French Football Federation) Montpellier
21	FW	Lucas Ozimec	18 January 2006 (aged 17)	(Canadian Soccer Association) Toronto FC Academy

=== Mali ===
Head coach: Soumaïla Coulibaly

No.	Pos.	Player	Date of birth (age)	Club
1	GK	**Bourama Koné**	10 March 2007 (aged 16)	(Malian Football Federation) Yeelen Olympique
2	DF	Moussa Traoré	30 December 2006 (aged 16)	(Malian Football Federation) CS Bamako
3	MF	Hamidou Makalou	15 July 2006 (aged 17)	(Malian Football Federation) Guidars
4	DF	Souleymane Sanogo	1 October 2006 (aged 17)	(Malian Football Federation) Yeelen Olympique
5	DF	Issa Traoré	14 November 2007 (aged 15)	(Malian Football Federation) Djoliba
6	DF	Sékou Koné	3 February 2006 (aged 17)	(Malian Football Federation) Guidars
7	MF	Modibo Sissoko	17 December 2006 (aged 16)	(Malian Football Federation) Guidars
8	FW	**Ibrahim Diarra**	12 December 2006 (aged 16)	(Malian Football Federation) Africa Foot
9	FW	Salif Leintu	20 June 2006 (aged 17)	(United States Soccer Federation) Bethesda SC
10	MF	Ange Martial Tia	20 November 2006 (aged 16)	(Malian Football Federation) Afrique Football Élite
11	FW	Ibrahim Kanaté	23 October 2006 (aged 17)	(Malian Football Federation) Afrique Football Élite
12	DF	Gaoussou Koné	22 November 2006 (aged 16)	(Malian Football Federation) Yeelen Olympique
13	FW	Badra Traoré	7 May 2006 (aged 17)	(French Football Federation) Metz
14	MF	Ousmane Thiero	8 April 2006 (aged 17)	(Malian Football Federation) AS Bamako
15	DF	Baye Coulibaly	8 January 2006 (aged 17)	(Malian Football Federation) Etoiles-du-Mandé
16	GK	Diaguine Sidibé	14 June 2006 (aged 17)	(Malian Football Federation) CS Bamako
17	FW	**Mamadou Doumbia**	18 February 2006 (aged 17)	(Malian Football Federation) AS Black Stars
18	DF	Moussa Massire Diop	1 September 2006 (aged 17)	(Malian Football Federation) Guidars
19	FW	Mahamoud Barry	11 June 2006 (aged 17)	(Malian Football Federation) Etoiles-du-Mandé
20	FW	Ousmane Diarra	25 October 2007 (aged 16)	(Senegalese Football Federation) Génération Foot
21	GK	Seriba Doumbia	11 January 2007 (aged 16)	(Malian Football Federation) CS Bamako

=== Uzbekistan ===
Uzbekistan named their squad on 3 November 2023.

Head coach: Jamoliddin Rakhmatullaev

No.	Pos.	Player	Date of birth (age)	Club
1	GK	Jakhongir Buriev	16 January 2006 (aged 17)	(Uzbekistan Football Association) Navbahor
2	MF	Aminbek Yokubov	27 December 2006 (aged 16)	(Uzbekistan Football Association) Lokomotiv Tashkent
3	MF	Yakhyo Urinboev	15 December 2006 (aged 16)	(Uzbekistan Football Association) Pakhtakor
4	DF	Bekhruz Karimov	7 August 2007 (aged 16)	(Uzbekistan Football Association) Odil Junior
5	MF	Azizbek Tulkunbekov	10 February 2007 (aged 16)	(Uzbekistan Football Association) Bunyodkor
6	DF	Ozodbek Uktamov	10 July 2006 (aged 17)	(Uzbekistan Football Association) Navbahor
7	MF	Lazizbek Mirzaev (captain)	5 October 2006 (aged 17)	(Uzbekistan Football Association) Lokomotiv Tashkent
8	DF	Bekhruz Shukurullaev	27 October 2006 (aged 17)	(Uzbekistan Football Association) Odil Junior
9	FW	Amirbek Saidov	1 February 2006 (aged 17)	(Uzbekistan Football Association) Bunyodkor
10	FW	Abdulkhamid Turgunboev	16 May 2006 (aged 17)	(Uzbekistan Football Association) Andijon-SGS
11	FW	Kuvonch Abraev	20 January 2007 (aged 16)	(Uzbekistan Football Association) Lokomotiv Tashkent
12	GK	Jakhongir Mamatkulov	20 June 2006 (aged 17)	(Uzbekistan Football Association) Qizilqum
13	DF	Bekhruz Jumatov	13 February 2006 (aged 17)	(Uzbekistan Football Association) Odil Junior
14	FW	Shodiyor Shodiboev	29 March 2006 (aged 17)	(Uzbekistan Football Association) Navbahor
15	DF	Ozodbek Ergashev	18 September 2006 (aged 17)	(Uzbekistan Football Association) Qizilqum
16	MF	Mukhammedali Reimov	26 June 2006 (aged 17)	(Uzbekistan Football Association) Olympic Tashkent
17	MF	Ollabergan Karimov	17 June 2006 (aged 17)	(Uzbekistan Football Association) Sogdiana
18	MF	Jasur Khikmatullaev	9 January 2006 (aged 17)	(Uzbekistan Football Association) Bunyodkor
19	DF	Sherzod Abdulburiev	20 June 2006 (aged 17)	(Uzbekistan Football Association) Navbahor
20	DF	Dilshod Abdullaev	9 May 2006 (aged 17)	(Uzbekistan Football Association) Olympic Tashkent
21	GK	Mukhammadyusuf Sobirov	20 April 2006 (aged 17)	(Uzbekistan Football Association) Bunyodkor

== Group C ==
=== Brazil ===
Brazil named their squad on 11 October 2023. On 9 November 2023, Luiz Gustavo was replaced by Guilherme Fumaça due to a rectus femoris injury.

Head coach: Phelipe Leal

No.	Pos.	Player	Date of birth (age)	Club
1	GK	Phillipe Gabriel	23 February 2006 (aged 17)	(Brazilian Football Confederation) Vasco da Gama
2	DF	Pedro Lima	1 July 2006 (aged 17)	(Brazilian Football Confederation) Sport Recife
3	DF	**Vitor Reis** (captain)	12 January 2006 (aged 17)	(Brazilian Football Confederation) Palmeiras
4	DF	Da Mata	13 March 2006 (aged 17)	(Brazilian Football Confederation) Grêmio
5	MF	Guilherme Fumaça	20 March 2006 (aged 17)	(Brazilian Football Confederation) São Paulo
6	DF	Souza	16 June 2006 (aged 17)	(Brazilian Football Confederation) Santos
7	FW	**Rayan**	3 August 2006 (aged 17)	(Brazilian Football Confederation) Vasco da Gama
8	MF	Lucas Camilo	25 May 2006 (aged 17)	(Brazilian Football Confederation) Grêmio
9	FW	Kauã Elias	28 March 2006 (aged 17)	(Brazilian Football Confederation) Fluminense
10	MF	Dudu	1 January 2006 (aged 17)	(Brazilian Football Confederation) Athletico Paranaense
11	FW	Lorran	4 July 2006 (aged 17)	(Brazilian Football Confederation) Flamengo
12	GK	Matheus Corrêa	31 January 2006 (aged 17)	(Brazilian Football Confederation) Corinthians
13	DF	Vitor Gabriel	11 March 2006 (aged 17)	(Brazilian Football Confederation) Atlético Mineiro
14	DF	João Souza	1 January 2007 (aged 16)	(Brazilian Football Confederation) Flamengo
15	MF	Matheus Ferreira	22 February 2006 (aged 17)	(Brazilian Football Confederation) Vasco da Gama
16	DF	Esquerdinha	28 February 2006 (aged 17)	(Brazilian Football Confederation) Fluminense
17	FW	Riquelme Fillipi	15 September 2006 (aged 17)	(Brazilian Football Confederation) Palmeiras
18	MF	Sidney	12 March 2006 (aged 17)	(Brazilian Football Confederation) Bahia
19	FW	Luighi	30 April 2006 (aged 17)	(Brazilian Football Confederation) Palmeiras
20	FW	**Estêvão**	24 April 2007 (aged 16)	(Brazilian Football Confederation) Palmeiras
21	GK	Pedro Cobra	16 May 2006 (aged 17)	(Brazilian Football Confederation) Atlético Mineiro

=== Iran ===
Head coach: Hossein Abdi

No.	Pos.	Player	Date of birth (age)	Club
1	GK	Arsha Shakouri	1 October 2006 (aged 17)	(Football Federation Islamic Republic of Iran) Havadar
2	DF	Nima Andarz	22 January 2006 (aged 17)	(Football Federation Islamic Republic of Iran) KIA Football Academy
3	DF	Hesam Nafari	7 May 2006 (aged 17)	(Football Federation Islamic Republic of Iran) Zob Ahan
4	DF	Alireza Homaeifard	14 January 2006 (aged 17)	(Football Federation Islamic Republic of Iran) Paykan
5	DF	Erfan Darvishaali	22 March 2006 (aged 17)	(Football Federation Islamic Republic of Iran) Foolad
6	MF	Samir Hoboobati	4 February 2006 (aged 17)	(Football Federation Islamic Republic of Iran) Persepolis
7	FW	Esmaeil Gholizadeh	18 February 2006 (aged 17)	(Football Federation Islamic Republic of Iran) Sepahan
8	MF	Amir Mohammad Razzaghinia	11 April 2006 (aged 17)	(Football Federation Islamic Republic of Iran) KIA Football Academy
9	DF	Yaghoob Barajeh	26 January 2006 (aged 17)	(Football Federation Islamic Republic of Iran) Mes Kerman
10	FW	Kasra Taheri	6 August 2006 (aged 17)	(Football Federation Islamic Republic of Iran) Sepahan
11	MF	Alireza Sharifi	20 March 2006 (aged 17)	(Football Federation Islamic Republic of Iran) KIA Football Academy
12	GK	Mohammad Hossein Sharifi	10 June 2006 (aged 17)	(Football Federation Islamic Republic of Iran) Esteghlal
13	DF	Ali Hassani	13 August 2006 (aged 17)	(Football Federation Islamic Republic of Iran) Foolad
14	MF	Zargham Saadavi	31 March 2006 (aged 17)	(Football Federation Islamic Republic of Iran) Foolad
15	MF	Mohammad Askari	7 February 2006 (aged 17)	(Football Federation Islamic Republic of Iran) Foolad
16	MF	Abolfazl Zamani	1 March 2006 (aged 17)	(Football Federation Islamic Republic of Iran) Paykan
17	FW	Reza Ghandipour	13 January 2006 (aged 17)	(Football Federation Islamic Republic of Iran) Paykan
18	MF	Mahan Sadeghi	23 March 2006 (aged 17)	(Football Federation Islamic Republic of Iran) Malavan
19	DF	Abolfazl Zoleykhaei	9 March 2006 (aged 17)	(Football Federation Islamic Republic of Iran) Parsian
20	GK	Armin Abbasi	20 May 2006 (aged 17)	(Football Federation Islamic Republic of Iran) Kowsar Lorestan
21	FW	Abolfazl Moredi	7 February 2006 (aged 17)	(Football Federation Islamic Republic of Iran) Foolad

=== New Caledonia ===
New Caledonia named their squad on 20 October 2023.

Head coach: (France) Léonardo Lopez

No.	Pos.	Player	Date of birth (age)	Club
1	GK	Claude Tiaouniane	4 May 2006 (aged 17)	(New Caledonian Football Federation) Hienghène Sport
2	DF	Ininë Huna	20 April 2006 (aged 17)	(New Caledonian Football Federation) ASC Gaïca
3	FW	Baptiste Kutran	6 February 2008 (aged 15)	(French Football Federation) Bordeaux
4	DF	Gregory Diko	25 February 2007 (aged 16)	(New Caledonian Football Federation) Lössi
5	DF	Wadria Hanye	17 December 2006 (aged 16)	(New Caledonian Football Federation) Lössi
6	MF	Joseph Hnaissilin	19 March 2006 (aged 17)	(New Caledonian Football Federation) Lössi
7	MF	Bayron Gohoupe	10 April 2007 (aged 16)	(New Caledonian Football Federation) Hienghène Sport
8	MF	Anthony Levy	23 October 2006 (aged 17)	(New Caledonian Football Federation) Mont-Dore
9	FW	Jean-Philippe Angexetine	26 February 2006 (aged 17)	(New Caledonian Football Federation) Drehu Athletico Club
10	FW	Nolhann Alebate	10 July 2006 (aged 17)	(New Caledonian Football Federation) Hienghène Sport
11	FW	Jean-Yves Saiko	19 September 2006 (aged 17)	(New Caledonian Football Federation) Lössi
12	MF	Jythrim Upa	2 October 2006 (aged 17)	(New Caledonian Football Federation) Lössi
13	MF	Simon Ue	9 February 2007 (aged 16)	(New Caledonian Football Federation) Mont-Dore
14	MF	Kyllian Wiako	4 September 2007 (aged 16)	(New Caledonian Football Federation) Magenta
15	FW	David Cahma	28 February 2007 (aged 16)	(New Caledonian Football Federation) Lössi
16	GK	Noa Bouchet Muller	20 August 2007 (aged 16)	(French Football Federation) FC Mougins
17	DF	Maël Raban Grangier	7 March 2006 (aged 17)	(New Caledonian Football Federation) Mont-Dore
18	MF	Numa Pamani	11 June 2006 (aged 17)	(New Caledonian Football Federation) Ne Drehu
19	DF	Ronald Nganyane	12 March 2006 (aged 17)	(New Caledonian Football Federation) Païta FC
20	FW	Paul Qaeze	18 May 2006 (aged 17)	(New Caledonian Football Federation) ASC Gaïca
21	GK	Nicolas Kutran	6 February 2008 (aged 15)	(French Football Federation) Bordeaux

=== England ===
England named their squad on 2 November 2023.

Head coach: Ryan Garry

No.	Pos.	Player	Date of birth (age)	Club
1	GK	Tommy Setford	13 March 2006 (aged 17)	(Royal Dutch Football Association) Ajax
2	DF	Josh Acheampong	5 May 2006 (aged 17)	(The Football Association) Chelsea
3	DF	Jayden Meghoma	28 June 2006 (aged 17)	(The Football Association) Southampton
4	MF	Finley McAllister	16 July 2006 (aged 17)	(The Football Association) Manchester United
5	DF	Lakyle Samuel (captain)	6 May 2006 (aged 17)	(The Football Association) Manchester City
6	DF	Ishé Samuels-Smith	5 June 2006 (aged 17)	(The Football Association) Chelsea
7	MF	Tyler Dibling	17 February 2006 (aged 17)	(The Football Association) Southampton
8	MF	Michael Golding	23 May 2006 (aged 17)	(The Football Association) Chelsea
9	FW	Justin Oboavwoduo	23 August 2006 (aged 17)	(The Football Association) Manchester City
10	FW	Sam Amo-Ameyaw	18 July 2006 (aged 17)	(The Football Association) Southampton
11	FW	Joel Ndala	31 May 2006 (aged 17)	(The Football Association) Manchester City
12	DF	Harrison Murray-Campbell	4 August 2006 (aged 17)	(The Football Association) Chelsea
13	GK	Ted Curd	14 February 2006 (aged 17)	(The Football Association) Hashtag United
14	MF	Reiss Russell-Denny	11 May 2006 (aged 17)	(The Football Association) Chelsea
15	DF	Joe Johnson	21 February 2006 (aged 17)	(The Football Association) Luton Town
16	MF	**Myles Lewis-Skelly**	26 September 2006 (aged 17)	(The Football Association) Arsenal
17	FW	Archie Stevens	11 January 2006 (aged 17)	(Scottish Football Association) Rangers
18	MF	Chris Rigg	18 June 2007 (aged 16)	(The Football Association) Sunderland
19	FW	Matty Warhurst	25 September 2006 (aged 17)	(The Football Association) Manchester City
20	MF	Ethan Nwaneri	21 March 2007 (aged 16)	(The Football Association) Arsenal
21	GK	Finlay Herrick	18 January 2006 (aged 17)	(The Football Association) West Ham United

== Group D ==
=== Japan ===
Japan named their squad on 25 October 2023. On 28 October 2023, Haruki Komori was replaced by Alexandre Pisano due to injury.

Head coach: Yoshiro Moriyama

No.	Pos.	Player	Date of birth (age)	Club
1	GK	Wataru Goto	8 May 2006 (aged 17)	(Japan Football Association) FC Tokyo
2	DF	Haruto Matsumoto	29 September 2006 (aged 17)	(Japan Football Association) Kashima Antlers
3	DF	Keita Kosugi (captain)	18 March 2006 (aged 17)	(Japan Football Association) Shonan Bellmare
4	DF	Kaito Tsuchiya	12 May 2006 (aged 17)	(Japan Football Association) Kawasaki Frontale
5	DF	Kotaro Honda	20 May 2006 (aged 17)	(Japan Football Association) Shonan Bellmare
6	MF	Joi Yamamoto	18 May 2006 (aged 17)	(Japan Football Association) Tokyo Verdy
7	MF	Yotaro Nakajima	22 April 2006 (aged 17)	(Japan Football Association) Sanfrecce Hiroshima
8	MF	Ryunosuke Yada	30 September 2006 (aged 17)	(Japan Football Association) Shimizu S-Pulse
9	FW	Yutaka Michiwaki	5 April 2006 (aged 17)	(Japan Football Association) Roasso Kumamoto
10	MF	**Ryūnosuke Satō**	16 October 2006 (aged 17)	(Japan Football Association) FC Tokyo
11	FW	Rento Takaoka	12 March 2007 (aged 16)	(Japan Football Association) Nissho Gakuen High School
12	GK	Taisei Kambayashi	21 February 2006 (aged 17)	(Japan Football Association) Montedio Yamagata
13	MF	Yumeki Yoshinaga	22 February 2006 (aged 17)	(Japan Football Association) Kamimura Gakuen High School
14	FW	Gaku Nawata	29 July 2006 (aged 17)	(Japan Football Association) Kamimura Gakuen High School
15	FW	Homare Tokuda	18 February 2007 (aged 16)	(Japan Football Association) Kashima Antlers
16	FW	Aren Inoue	19 September 2008 (aged 15)	(Japan Football Association) Sanfrecce Hiroshima
17	DF	Shotaro Shibata	17 April 2006 (aged 17)	(Japan Football Association) Kawasaki Frontale
18	DF	Shuto Nagano	15 April 2006 (aged 17)	(Japan Football Association) FC Tokyo
19	DF	Katsuma Fuse	11 March 2007 (aged 16)	(Japan Football Association) Nihon University Fujisawa High School
20	MF	Gakuto Kawamura	6 April 2006 (aged 17)	(Japan Football Association) Tokyo Verdy
21	GK	**Alexandre Pisano**	10 January 2006 (aged 17)	(Japan Football Association) Nagoya Grampus

=== Poland ===
Poland named their squad on 25 October 2023. On 6 November 2023, Oskar Tomczyk, Filip Rózga, Jan Łabędzki and Filip Wolski were removed from the squad for disciplinary reasons.

Head coach: Marcin Włodarski

No.	Pos.	Player	Date of birth (age)	Club
1	GK	Miłosz Piekutowski	8 May 2006 (aged 17)	(Polish Football Association) Jagiellonia Białystok
2	DF	Dominik Szala	24 April 2006 (aged 17)	(Polish Football Association) Górnik Zabrze
3	DF	Jakub Krzyżanowski	19 January 2006 (aged 17)	(Polish Football Association) Wisła Kraków
4	DF	Igor Orlikowski	9 February 2006 (aged 17)	(Polish Football Association) Zagłębie Lubin
5	DF	Michał Gurgul	30 January 2006 (aged 17)	(Polish Football Association) Lech Poznań
6	MF	Maksymilian Sznaucner	30 March 2006 (aged 17)	(Hellenic Football Federation) PAOK
8	MF	Karol Borys	28 September 2006 (aged 17)	(Polish Football Association) Śląsk Wrocław
10	FW	Daniel Mikołajewski	24 January 2006 (aged 17)	(Italian Football Federation) Parma
11	MF	Krzysztof Kolanko (captain)	3 August 2006 (aged 17)	(Polish Football Association) Górnik Zabrze
12	GK	Michał Matys	6 May 2006 (aged 17)	(Polish Football Association) Zagłębie Lubin
13	MF	Szymon Łyczko	10 February 2006 (aged 17)	(Polish Football Association) Stal Rzeszów
14	MF	Mateusz Skoczylas	20 September 2006 (aged 17)	(Italian Football Federation) AC Milan
15	DF	Piotr Kowalik	19 June 2006 (aged 17)	(Polish Football Association) Sandecja Nowy Sącz
16	GK	Robin Lisewski	13 February 2006 (aged 17)	(German Football Association) Borussia Dortmund
17	FW	Mike Huras	28 January 2006 (aged 17)	(German Football Association) VfB Stuttgart
19	MF	Igor Brzyski	15 March 2007 (aged 16)	(Polish Football Association) Lech Poznań
21	MF	Marcel Reguła	26 October 2006 (aged 17)	(Polish Football Association) Zagłębie Lubin

=== Argentina ===
Argentina named their squad on 24 October 2023.

Head coach: Diego Placente

No.	Pos.	Player	Date of birth (age)	Club
1	GK	Froilán Díaz	1 June 2006 (aged 17)	(Argentine Football Association) Unión de Santa Fe
2	DF	Ulises Giménez	1 January 2006 (aged 17)	(Argentine Football Association) River Plate
3	DF	Octavio Ontivero	10 January 2006 (aged 17)	(Argentine Football Association) Lanús
4	DF	Dylan Gorosito	3 February 2006 (aged 17)	(Argentine Football Association) Boca Juniors
5	MF	Mariano Gerez	19 January 2006 (aged 17)	(Argentine Football Association) Lanús
6	DF	Juan Manuel Villalba	15 March 2006 (aged 17)	(Argentine Football Association) Vélez Sarsfield
7	FW	Ian Subiabre	1 January 2007 (aged 16)	(Argentine Football Association) River Plate
8	MF	Gustavo Albarracín	28 April 2006 (aged 17)	(Argentine Football Association) Talleres
9	FW	Agustín Ruberto	14 January 2006 (aged 17)	(Argentine Football Association) River Plate
10	MF	Claudio Echeverri (captain)	2 January 2006 (aged 17)	(Argentine Football Association) River Plate
11	FW	Santiago López	9 February 2006 (aged 17)	(Argentine Football Association) Independiente
12	GK	Jeremías Florentín	1 September 2006 (aged 17)	(Argentine Football Association) Talleres
13	DF	Valente Pierani	22 February 2006 (aged 17)	(Argentine Football Association) Estudiantes
14	DF	Tobías Palacio	11 November 2006 (aged 16)	(Argentine Football Association) Argentinos Juniors
15	DF	Juan Giménez	27 April 2006 (aged 17)	(Argentine Football Association) Rosario Central
16	MF	Thiago Laplace	3 April 2006 (aged 17)	(Argentine Football Association) Lanús
17	MF	Valentino Acuña	27 January 2006 (aged 17)	(Argentine Football Association) Newell's Old Boys
18	MF	Kevin Gutiérrez	30 January 2006 (aged 17)	(Argentine Football Association) Rosario Central
19	FW	Maher Carrizo	19 February 2006 (aged 17)	(Argentine Football Association) Vélez Sarsfield
20	MF	**Franco Mastantuono**	14 August 2007 (aged 16)	(Argentine Football Association) River Plate
21	GK	Franco Villalba	3 February 2006 (aged 17)	(Argentine Football Association) Vélez Sarsfield

=== Senegal ===
Head coach: Serigne Dia

No.	Pos.	Player	Date of birth (age)	Club
1	GK	Serigne Diouf	25 March 2006 (aged 17)	(Senegalese Football Federation) Génération Foot
2	FW	Clayton Diandy	29 July 2006 (aged 17)	(Senegalese Football Federation) ASC Espoirs De GWYE
3	DF	Mamadou Diallo	21 February 2007 (aged 16)	(Senegalese Football Federation) Diambars
4	DF	Fallou Diouf	31 December 2006 (aged 16)	(Senegalese Football Federation) Génération Foot
5	DF	Boubacar Ba	5 January 2006 (aged 17)	(Senegalese Football Federation) Étoile Lusitana
6	MF	**Pape Diong**	15 June 2006 (aged 17)	(Senegalese Football Federation) AF Darou Salam
7	FW	Yaya Diémé	16 October 2007 (aged 16)	(Senegalese Football Federation) Diambars
8	MF	Saliou Faye	10 March 2006 (aged 17)	(Senegalese Football Federation) Génération Foot
9	FW	Omar Sall	2 November 2008 (aged 15)	(Senegalese Football Federation) Envi Foot
10	FW	**Amara Diouf**	7 June 2008 (aged 15)	(Senegalese Football Federation) Génération Foot
11	MF	Lamine Sadio	24 December 2007 (aged 15)	(Senegalese Football Federation) Envi Foot
12	DF	Guy Lima	7 October 2006 (aged 17)	(Senegalese Football Federation) AFAT FC
13	MF	Alpha Touré	25 January 2006 (aged 17)	(Senegalese Football Federation) Génération Foot
14	MF	Pierre Dorival	15 March 2006 (aged 17)	(Senegalese Football Federation) Dakar Sacré-Cœur
15	FW	Mamadou Gning	22 December 2006 (aged 16)	(Senegalese Football Federation) ASC Espoirs De GWYE
16	GK	Macoura Mboup	18 December 2007 (aged 15)	(Senegalese Football Federation) Génération Foot
17	DF	Ibrahima Diallo	13 September 2007 (aged 16)	(Senegalese Football Federation) Génération Foot
18	FW	Mamadou Sawane	22 February 2006 (aged 17)	(Senegalese Football Federation) AFAT FC
19	FW	**Idrissa Gueye**	16 September 2006 (aged 17)	(Senegalese Football Federation) Mbour Petite-Côte
20	FW	Chérif Niabaly	28 August 2006 (aged 17)	(Senegalese Football Federation) Océan FC
21	GK	Bamba Fall	7 July 2007 (aged 16)	(Senegalese Football Federation) Diambars

== Group E ==
=== France ===
France named their squad on 30 October 2023.

Head coach: Jean-Luc Vannuchi

No.	Pos.	Player	Date of birth (age)	Club
1	GK	Paul Argney	23 May 2006 (aged 17)	(French Football Federation) Le Havre
2	DF	Yvann Titi	5 May 2006 (aged 17)	(French Football Federation) Troyes
3	DF	Nhoa Sangui	27 February 2006 (aged 17)	(French Football Federation) Reims
4	DF	Bastien Meupiyou	19 March 2006 (aged 17)	(French Football Federation) Nantes
5	DF	Joachim Kayi Sanda	29 November 2006 (aged 16)	(French Football Federation) Valenciennes
6	MF	Nolan Ferro	18 January 2006 (aged 17)	(French Football Federation) Strasbourg
7	FW	Yanis Issoufou	28 October 2006 (aged 17)	(French Football Federation) Montpellier
8	MF	Saïmon Bouabré	1 June 2006 (aged 17)	(French Football Federation) Monaco
9	FW	Mathis Lambourde	9 January 2006 (aged 17)	(French Football Federation) Rennes
10	MF	Ismaïl Bouneb	7 June 2006 (aged 17)	(French Football Federation) Valenciennes
11	FW	Tidiam Gomis	8 August 2006 (aged 17)	(French Football Federation) Caen
12	DF	Yoram Zague	15 May 2006 (aged 17)	(French Football Federation) Paris Saint-Germain
13	DF	Aymen Sadi	10 April 2006 (aged 17)	(French Football Federation) Valenciennes
14	MF	Fodé Sylla	16 April 2006 (aged 17)	(French Football Federation) Lens
15	DF	Arthur Tchaptchet	10 May 2006 (aged 17)	(French Football Federation) Reims
16	GK	Mathys Niflore	2 March 2007 (aged 16)	(French Football Federation) Toulouse
17	FW	Tidiane Diallo	28 May 2006 (aged 17)	(French Football Federation) Strasbourg
18	FW	Mohamed-Amine Bouchenna	15 June 2006 (aged 17)	(French Football Federation) Clermont
19	FW	Joan Tincres	17 June 2006 (aged 17)	(French Football Federation) Monaco
20	MF	Mathis Amougou	18 January 2006 (aged 17)	(French Football Federation) Saint-Étienne
21	GK	Timothé Viel	19 May 2006 (aged 17)	(French Football Federation) Ajaccio

=== Burkina Faso ===
Head coach: Brahima Traoré

No.	Pos.	Player	Date of birth (age)	Club
1	GK	Isidore Traoré	20 August 2006 (aged 17)	(Burkinabé Football Federation) Vitesse
2	DF	Hamzah Traoré	7 April 2007 (aged 16)	(Burkinabé Football Federation) Rahimo
3	FW	Aboubacar Camara	30 September 2006 (aged 17)	(Burkinabé Football Federation) Rahimo
4	DF	Aly Sokondou	10 November 2006 (aged 17)	(Burkinabé Football Federation) Réal du Faso
5	DF	Junior Traore	21 February 2006 (aged 17)	(Burkinabé Football Federation) News Stars FC
6	MF	Baldé Bah	25 January 2006 (aged 17)	(Burkinabé Football Federation) News Stars FC
7	FW	**Ousmane Camara**	1 January 2006 (aged 17)	(Burkinabé Football Federation) Rahimo
8	MF	Arouna Ouattara	27 December 2006 (aged 16)	(Burkinabé Football Federation) Vitesse
9	FW	**Jack Diarra**	16 June 2006 (aged 17)	(Burkinabé Football Federation) Salitas
10	MF	Cheick Camara	1 January 2006 (aged 17)	(Burkinabé Football Federation) Vitesse
11	FW	Appolinaire Bougma	15 January 2007 (aged 16)	(Burkinabé Football Federation) AS ECO
12	DF	Faycal Traore	27 June 2006 (aged 17)	(Burkinabé Football Federation) ASF Bobo Dioulasso
13	MF	Abdoul Sambare	24 August 2006 (aged 17)	(Royal Belgian Football Association) Charleroi
14	DF	Lassina Traoré	10 January 2007 (aged 16)	(Burkinabé Football Federation) Rahimo
15	MF	Idrissa Sore	26 February 2007 (aged 16)	(Burkinabé Football Federation) Réal du Faso
16	GK	Abdoulaye Traoré	27 March 2006 (aged 17)	(Burkinabé Football Federation) Association Nassara FC
17	DF	Landry Yaméogo	31 December 2006 (aged 16)	(Burkinabé Football Federation) Réal du Faso
18	FW	Souleymane Alio	28 October 2006 (aged 17)	(Burkinabé Football Federation) News Stars FC
19	MF	Bougasse Pouabizan	7 January 2006 (aged 17)	(Burkinabé Football Federation) Salitas
20	MF	Emmanuel Ouédraogo	24 November 2007 (aged 15)	(Burkinabé Football Federation) Rahimo
21	GK	Amine Compaoré	31 December 2007 (aged 15)	(Burkinabé Football Federation) KOZAF

=== South Korea ===
South Korea named their squad on 24 October 2023.

Head coach: Byun Sung-hwan

No.	Pos.	Player	Date of birth (age)	Club
1	GK	Lee Gyung-jun	27 January 2006 (aged 17)	(Korea Football Association) Suwon Samsung Bluewings
2	DF	Lee Soo-ro	18 January 2006 (aged 17)	(Korea Football Association) Jeonbuk Hyundai Motors
3	DF	Lee Chang-woo	12 March 2006 (aged 17)	(Korea Football Association) Boin High School
4	DF	Kang Min-woo	2 March 2006 (aged 17)	(Korea Football Association) Ulsan Hyundai
5	DF	Yoo Min-jun	21 March 2006 (aged 17)	(Korea Football Association) Seongnam
6	MF	Cha Jae-hoon	3 May 2006 (aged 17)	(Korea Football Association) Chunggyung High School
7	MF	Yoon Do-yong	28 October 2006 (aged 17)	(Korea Football Association) Daejeon Hana Citizen
8	MF	Baek In-woo	29 November 2006 (aged 16)	(Korea Football Association) Yongin City
9	FW	Kim Myeong-jun	21 March 2006 (aged 17)	(Korea Football Association) Pohang Steelers
10	MF	Jin Tae-ho	20 January 2006 (aged 17)	(Korea Football Association) Jeonbuk Hyundai Motors
11	MF	**Yang Min-hyeok**	16 April 2006 (aged 17)	(Korea Football Association) Gangwon
12	DF	Bae Seong-ho	13 November 2006 (aged 16)	(Korea Football Association) Daejeon Hana Citizen
13	FW	Baek Ga-on	23 January 2006 (aged 17)	(Korea Football Association) Boin High School
14	MF	Kim Hyun-min	30 July 2006 (aged 17)	(Korea Football Association) Youngdeungpo High School
15	DF	Seo Jeong-hyeok	9 March 2006 (aged 17)	(Korea Football Association) Jeonbuk Hyundai Motors
16	MF	Lim Hyun-sub	16 January 2006 (aged 17)	(Korea Football Association) Suwon Samsung Bluewings
17	FW	Han Seok-jin	19 December 2007 (aged 15)	(Korea Football Association) Jeonbuk Hyundai Motors
18	GK	Hong Seong-min	29 September 2006 (aged 17)	(Korea Football Association) Pohang Steelers
19	MF	Hwang Eun-chong	10 January 2006 (aged 17)	(Korea Football Association) Shinpyeong High School
20	DF	Kim Yu-geon	28 March 2006 (aged 17)	(Korea Football Association) FC Seoul
21	GK	Woo Gyu-jeong	16 May 2006 (aged 17)	(Korea Football Association) Daejeon Hana Citizen

=== United States ===
United States announced their squad on 25 October 2023.

Head coach: Gonzalo Segares

No.	Pos.	Player	Date of birth (age)	Club
1	GK	Adam Beaudry	18 April 2006 (aged 17)	(United States Soccer Federation) Colorado Rapids
2	DF	Oscar Verhoeven	31 May 2006 (aged 17)	(United States Soccer Federation) San Jose Earthquakes
3	DF	Tahir Reid-Brown	2 July 2006 (aged 17)	(United States Soccer Federation) Orlando City
4	DF	Tyler Hall (captain)	5 February 2006 (aged 17)	(United States Soccer Federation) Inter Miami
5	DF	Stuart Hawkins	18 September 2006 (aged 17)	(United States Soccer Federation) Tacoma Defiance
6	MF	Matthew Corcoran	17 February 2006 (aged 17)	(United States Soccer Federation) Birmingham Legion
7	FW	Nimfasha Berchimas	22 February 2008 (aged 15)	(United States Soccer Federation) Charlotte FC
8	MF	Pedro Soma	30 June 2006 (aged 17)	(Royal Spanish Football Federation) Cornellà
9	FW	Micah Burton	26 March 2006 (aged 17)	(United States Soccer Federation) Austin FC
10	MF	Cruz Medina	24 September 2006 (aged 17)	(United States Soccer Federation) San Jose Earthquakes
11	FW	David Vazquez	22 February 2006 (aged 17)	(United States Soccer Federation) Philadelphia Union
12	GK	Duran Ferree	28 September 2006 (aged 17)	(United States Soccer Federation) San Diego Loyal
13	FW	**Peyton Miller**	15 May 2007 (aged 16)	(United States Soccer Federation) New England Revolution
14	MF	Taha Habroune	5 February 2006 (aged 17)	(United States Soccer Federation) Columbus Crew
15	DF	Noahkai Banks	1 December 2006 (aged 16)	(German Football Association) FC Augsburg
16	MF	Santiago Morales	9 February 2007 (aged 16)	(United States Soccer Federation) Inter Miami
17	FW	**Keyrol Figueroa**	31 August 2006 (aged 17)	(The Football Association) Liverpool
18	DF	Aiden Harangi	8 February 2006 (aged 17)	(German Football Association) Eintracht Frankfurt
19	MF	Paulo Rudisill	7 February 2006 (aged 17)	(United States Soccer Federation) LA Galaxy
20	FW	Bryce Jamison	6 January 2006 (aged 17)	(United States Soccer Federation) Orange County SC
21	GK	Zackory Campagnolo	12 March 2007 (aged 16)	(United States Soccer Federation) Colorado Rapids

== Group F ==
=== Mexico ===
Mexico named their squad on 27 October 2023. On 8 November 2023, Hugo Camberos was replaced by Adrián Fernández de Lara due to injury.

Head coach: Raúl Chabrand

No.	Pos.	Player	Date of birth (age)	Club
1	GK	Paolo Bedolla	1 January 2006 (aged 17)	(Mexican Football Federation) América
2	DF	Javier Suárez	4 May 2006 (aged 17)	(Mexican Football Federation) Cruz Azul
3	DF	Kevin García	9 February 2006 (aged 17)	(Mexican Football Federation) Santos Laguna
4	DF	Luis Navarrete	23 August 2006 (aged 17)	(Mexican Football Federation) Toluca
5	DF	Javen Romero	21 April 2006 (aged 17)	(United States Soccer Federation) Los Angeles FC
6	MF	Isaac Martínez	23 March 2006 (aged 17)	(Mexican Football Federation) Guadalajara
7	FW	Brandon Lomelí	10 November 2006 (aged 17)	(Mexican Football Federation) Necaxa
8	MF	José Urías	25 March 2006 (aged 17)	(Mexican Football Federation) Monterrey
9	FW	Stephano Carrillo	7 March 2006 (aged 17)	(Mexican Football Federation) Santos Laguna
10	MF	Gael Álvarez	9 March 2006 (aged 17)	(Mexican Football Federation) Pachuca
11	MF	Fidel Barajas	5 April 2006 (aged 17)	(United States Soccer Federation) Charleston Battery
12	GK	Fernando Delgado	25 July 2006 (aged 17)	(United States Soccer Federation) Real Salt Lake
13	DF	Adrian Ortellao	16 May 2006 (aged 17)	(United States Soccer Federation) North Carolina FC
14	DF	Manuel Sánchez	6 February 2006 (aged 17)	(Mexican Football Federation) UNAM
15	MF	Luis Ortiz	9 July 2006 (aged 17)	(Mexican Football Federation) Monterrey
16	MF	Daniel Vázquez	6 April 2006 (aged 17)	(Mexican Football Federation) Necaxa
17	FW	Adrián Fernández de Lara	5 May 2006 (aged 17)	(Mexican Football Federation) América
18	FW	Tahiel Jiménez	22 January 2006 (aged 17)	(Mexican Football Federation) Santos Laguna
19	FW	Mateo Levy	22 October 2006 (aged 17)	(Mexican Football Federation) Cruz Azul
20	FW	Francisco Valenzuela	13 April 2007 (aged 16)	(Mexican Football Federation) Monterrey
21	GK	Roberto Moreno	26 February 2006 (aged 17)	(Mexican Football Federation) Cruz Azul

=== Germany ===
Germany named their squad on 1 November 2023. On 12 November, it was announced that Farid Alfa-Ruprecht had been replaced by Bilal Yalçınkaya due to illness.

Head coach: Christian Wück

No.	Pos.	Player	Date of birth (age)	Club
1	GK	Max Schmitt	18 January 2006 (aged 17)	(German Football Association) Bayern Munich
2	MF	Kurt Rüger	15 February 2006 (aged 17)	(German Football Association) Bayern Munich
3	DF	Almugera Kabar	6 June 2006 (aged 17)	(German Football Association) Borussia Dortmund
4	DF	Finn Jeltsch	17 July 2006 (aged 17)	(German Football Association) 1. FC Nürnberg
5	DF	Maxim Dal	26 January 2006 (aged 17)	(German Football Association) Mainz 05
6	MF	Fayssal Harchaoui	15 January 2006 (aged 17)	(German Football Association) 1. FC Köln
7	FW	Paris Brunner	15 February 2006 (aged 17)	(German Football Association) Borussia Dortmund
8	DF	Maximilian Herwerth	9 February 2006 (aged 17)	(German Football Association) VfB Stuttgart
9	FW	Max Moerstedt	15 January 2006 (aged 17)	(German Football Association) TSG Hoffenheim
10	MF	Noah Darvich (captain)	25 September 2006 (aged 17)	(Royal Spanish Football Federation) Barcelona
11	MF	Charles Herrmann	21 January 2006 (aged 17)	(German Football Association) Borussia Dortmund
12	GK	Konstantin Heide	27 January 2006 (aged 17)	(German Football Association) SpVgg Unterhaching
13	DF	Maximilian Hennig	12 October 2006 (aged 17)	(German Football Association) Bayern Munich
14	DF	David Odogu	3 June 2006 (aged 17)	(German Football Association) VfL Wolfsburg
15	DF	Justin von der Hitz	22 October 2006 (aged 17)	(German Football Association) 1. FC Köln
16	MF	Winners Osawe	29 November 2006 (aged 16)	(German Football Association) RB Leipzig
17	DF	Eric da Silva Moreira	3 May 2006 (aged 17)	(German Football Association) FC St. Pauli
18	MF	Bilal Yalçınkaya	30 March 2006 (aged 17)	(German Football Association) Hamburger SV
19	MF	**Assan Ouédraogo**	9 May 2006 (aged 17)	(German Football Association) Schalke 04
20	FW	Robert Ramšak	28 October 2006 (aged 17)	(German Football Association) Bayern Munich
21	GK	Louis Babatz	14 January 2006 (aged 17)	(German Football Association) Mainz 05

=== Venezuela ===
Head coach: (Argentina) Ricardo Valiño

No.	Pos.	Player	Date of birth (age)	Club
1	GK	Jorge Sánchez	30 September 2006 (aged 17)	(Venezuelan Football Federation) Deportivo La Guaira
2	DF	Pablo Ibarra	14 May 2006 (aged 17)	(United States Soccer Federation) IMG Academy
3	DF	Santiago Silva	1 May 2006 (aged 17)	(Royal Spanish Football Federation) Rayo Vallecano
4	DF	Yiandro Raap	25 July 2006 (aged 17)	(Royal Dutch Football Association) PSV Eindhoven
5	FW	José Correa	25 March 2006 (aged 17)	(Venezuelan Football Federation) Nueva Esparta
6	DF	Rai Hidalgo	14 February 2006 (aged 17)	(Venezuelan Football Federation) Puerto Cabello
7	MF	Leenhan Romero	1 November 2006 (aged 17)	(Football Federation of Chile) Universidad Católica
8	MF	Giovanny Sequera	14 February 2006 (aged 17)	(Venezuelan Football Federation) Metropolitanos
9	FW	Lucciano Reinoso	10 July 2006 (aged 17)	(Venezuelan Football Federation) Caracas
10	MF	**David Martínez**	7 February 2006 (aged 17)	(Venezuelan Football Federation) Monagas
11	MF	Juan Arango Jr.	27 June 2006 (aged 17)	(Royal Spanish Football Federation) Girona
12	GK	Jesús Lara	20 June 2006 (aged 17)	(Venezuelan Football Federation) Mineros de Guayana
13	GK	Salvador Bolívar	10 May 2006 (aged 17)	(Venezuelan Football Federation) Caracas
14	MF	Miguel Vegas	22 May 2006 (aged 17)	(Venezuelan Football Federation) Caracas
15	DF	Ángel Borgo	10 July 2006 (aged 17)	(Venezuelan Football Federation) Puerto Cabello
16	MF	Frangel Huice	1 September 2006 (aged 17)	(Venezuelan Football Federation) Universidad Central
17	MF	Mayken González	11 May 2006 (aged 17)	(Venezuelan Football Federation) Deportivo La Guaira
18	FW	Alejandro Cichero	11 July 2006 (aged 17)	(Italian Football Federation) Frosinone
19	FW	Junior Colina	9 December 2006 (aged 16)	(Venezuelan Football Federation) Rayo Zuliano
20	DF	**Luis Balbo**	28 March 2006 (aged 17)	(Portuguese Football Federation) Famalicão
21	MF	Nicola Profeta	27 February 2006 (aged 17)	(Colombian Football Federation) Deportivo Cali

=== New Zealand ===
New Zealand named their squad on 31 October 2023.

Head coach: (England) Martin Bullock

No.	Pos.	Player	Date of birth (age)	Club
1	GK	Matt Foord	19 February 2006 (aged 17)	(New Zealand Football) Cashmere Technical
2	FW	Mac Prathumphithak	4 May 2006 (aged 17)	(New Zealand Football) Christchurch United
3	MF	Marley Leuluai	8 November 2006 (aged 17)	(The Football Association) Burnley
4	DF	Luka Coveny	11 March 2006 (aged 17)	(Football Australia) Western United
5	DF	Anton Isaako	11 March 2007 (aged 16)	(Football Australia) Sydney FC
6	DF	Dylan Gardiner	10 July 2006 (aged 17)	(New Zealand Football) Hamilton Wanderers
7	FW	Matt D'Hotman	3 April 2006 (aged 17)	(New Zealand Football) Melville United
8	MF	Paris Domfeh	3 October 2007 (aged 16)	(New Zealand Football) Wellington Phoenix
9	FW	Stipe Ukich	3 January 2007 (aged 16)	(New Zealand Football) Auckland City
10	FW	Adam Watson	22 February 2006 (aged 17)	(The Football Association) Stoke City
11	FW	Luke Supyk	4 March 2006 (aged 17)	(New Zealand Football) Wellington Phoenix
12	GK	Josh Brown	4 February 2006 (aged 17)	(New Zealand Football) Western Suburbs
13	DF	Noah Dupont	18 October 2007 (aged 16)	(The Football Association) West Bromwich Albion
14	DF	Nick Murphy	9 January 2006 (aged 17)	(New Zealand Football) Christchurch United
15	DF	Athan Thompson	16 January 2007 (aged 16)	(New Zealand Football) Wellington Phoenix
16	DF	Jesper Edwards	8 April 2006 (aged 17)	(New Zealand Football) Wellington Phoenix
17	FW	Nathan Walker	30 January 2006 (aged 17)	(New Zealand Football) Fencibles
18	FW	Gabriel Sloane-Rodrigues	3 July 2007 (aged 16)	(New Zealand Football) Wellington Phoenix
19	MF	Anaru Cassidy	26 February 2006 (aged 17)	(New Zealand Football) Wellington Phoenix
20	MF	Luke Mitchell	29 August 2006 (aged 17)	(New Zealand Football) Hamilton Wanderers
21	GK	Eamonn McCarron	14 September 2007 (aged 16)	(New Zealand Football) Wellington Phoenix
