= Alio (surname) =

Alio is a surname. Notable people with the surname include:

- Francesc Alió (1862–1908), Spanish composer
- Mustafa Alio, Syrian refugee
- Salma Khalil Alio (born 1982), Chadian poet
- Souleymane Alio (born 2006), Ivorian footballer

== See also ==
- Alio Die, stage name of Italian composer Stefano Musso
