= 2023 U-17 Africa Cup of Nations qualification =

Tournament details
- Host countries: Algeria (North Zone); Mauritania (West A Zone); Ghana (West B Zone); Cameroon (Central Zone); Ethiopia (Central-East Zone); Malawi (South Zone)
- Dates: 11 June 2022 – 18 January 2023

Tournament statistics
- Matches played: 52
- Goals scored: 185 (3.56 per match)
- Top scorer: (South Africa) Siyabonga Mabena (9 goals)

The 2023 U-17 Africa Cup of Nations qualification was a men's under-17 football competition which decided the participating teams of the 2023 U-17 Africa Cup of Nations.

Players born 1 January 2006 or later were eligible to participate in the competition. A total of twelve teams qualified to play in the final tournament, including Algeria who qualified automatically as hosts.

== Teams ==
Since the 2021 U-17 Africa Cup of Nations was cancelled, this will be the first edition in Africa U-17 Cup of Nations to have expanded to 12 teams instead of eight. Each of the six zones received two spots in the final tournament.

Zone	Spots	Teams entering qualification	Did not enter
North Zone (UNAF)	1 spot + hosts	Egypt; Libya; **Morocco**; Tunisia	**Algeria (Q, H)**
West A Zone (WAFU-UFOA A)	2 spots	Cape Verde; Liberia **(D)** (Note: Liberia were disqualified from the qualifiers after two of their players failed to pass the MRI test.); **Mali**; Mauritania **(H)**; **Senegal**; Sierra Leone	Gambia; Guinea; Guinea-Bissau
West B Zone (WAFU-UFOA B)	2 spots	Benin; **Burkina Faso**; Ghana **(H)**; Ivory Coast; Niger; **Nigeria**; Togo	
Central Zone (UNIFFAC)	2 spots	**Cameroon (H)**; Central African Republic; Chad **(D)** (Note: Chad and DR Congo were disqualified from the qualifiers after one of their players failed to pass the MRI test.); **Congo**; DR Congo **(D)**	Equatorial Guinea; Gabon; São Tomé and Príncipe
Central-East Zone (CECAFA)	2 spots	Burundi; Djibouti **(D)** (Note: Djibouti & Sudan were disqualified from the qualifiers after some of their players failed to pass the MRI test.); Eritrea **(W)** (Note: Eritrea & Rwanda withdrew from the qualifiers after the group stage draw was conducted.); Ethiopia **(H)**; Rwanda **(W)**; **Somalia**; **South Sudan**; Sudan **(D)**; Tanzania; Uganda	Kenya
South Zone (COSAFA)	2 spots	Angola **(D)** (Note: Angola were disqualified from the qualifiers after a few of their players failed to pass the MRI test.); Botswana; Malawi **(H)**; Mauritius **(W)** (Note: Mauritius withdrew from the qualifiers after the group stage draw was conducted.); Mozambique; Namibia; Seychelles; **South Africa**; **Zambia**	Comoros; Eswatini; Lesotho; Madagascar; Zimbabwe

Notes

- Teams in **bold** qualified for the final tournament.
- (H): Qualifying tournament hosts
- (Q): Automatically qualified for final tournament regardless of qualification results
- (W): Withdrew
- (D): Disqualified

== Schedule ==
The qualifying competition was split into regional competitions, with the teams entering the qualifying tournament of their zone. The schedule of each qualifying zone was as follows.

Zone	Group stage	Knockout stage
West B Zone	11–18 June 2022	21–24 June 2022
West A Zone	1–5 October 2022	7–9 October 2022
Central-East Zone	3–9 October 2022	12–15 October 2022
North Zone	8–14 November 2022	—N/a
South Zone	2–7 December 2022	9–11 December 2022
Central Zone	12–18 January 2023	—N/a

== North Zone ==
The 2022 UNAF U-17 Tournament, which also served as the qualifiers for the Africa U-17 Cup of Nations, took place between 8 and 14 November 2022 in Algiers, Algeria. The four teams were placed in one group, with the winners qualifying for the final tournament. Algeria didn't participate in the tournament, as were automatically qualified for the final tournament as hosts.

All times are local, DPRA (UTC+1).

Pos	Team	Pld	W	D	L	GF	GA	GD	Pts	Qualification
1	Morocco	3	3	0	0	5	1	+4	9	2023 Africa U-17 Cup of Nations
2	Egypt	3	1	0	2	5	5	0	3	
3	Libya	3	1	0	2	4	5	−1	3	
4	Tunisia	3	1	0	2	4	7	−3	3	

Source: UNAF
Rules for classification: 1) Points; 2) Goal difference; 3) Goals scored
8 November 2022
15:00

Tunisia	0–2	Morocco
	Report	Maali 56' (pen.); Bakhti 86'

Stade du 5 Juillet, Algiers
Referee: Abdoul Karim Twagiramukiza (Rwanda)
8 November 2022
18:15

Libya	2–1	Egypt
Al Mesmari 37'; Al Zakouzi 58'	Report	Mohamed 45+1' (pen.)

Stade du 5 Juillet, Algiers
Referee: Lahlou Benbraham (Algeria)

11 November 2022
15:00

Egypt	3–1	Tunisia
Abdel-Aziz 15'; Moawad 54'; Abdelkarim 90+1'	Report	Al Gharbi 81'

Stade du 5 Juillet, Algiers
Referee: Mohamed Agha (Libya)
11 November 2022
18:15

Morocco	1–0	Libya
Ashtar 24'	Report

Stade du 5 Juillet, Algiers
Referee: Youcef Gamouh (Algeria)

14 November 2022
15:00

Tunisia	3–2	Libya
Dendani 54' (pen.), 80'; Amdouni 87'	Report	Al Mabrouk 4' (pen.); Kerwash 84'

Stade du 5 Juillet, Algiers
Referee: Lahlou Benbraham (Algeria)
14 November 2022
15:00

Egypt	1–2	Morocco
Abdel-Aziz 58'	Report	Maali 7'; Nair 45'

Salem Mabrouki Stadium, Algiers
Referee: Abdoul Karim Twagirumukiza (Rwanda)

== West A Zone ==
The WAFU-UFOA Zone A qualifiers for the Africa U-17 Cup of Nations were hosted by Mauritania with the matches played between 1 and 9 October 2022. The draw was announced on 21 July 2022.

All times are local, GMT (UTC±0).

=== Group stage ===
The six teams were drawn into two groups of three teams. The winners and the runners-up of each group advanced to the semi-finals.

Group A

Pos	Team	Pld	W	D	L	GF	GA	GD	Pts	Qualification
1	Sierra Leone	1	1	0	0	3	0	+3	3	Semi-finals
2	Mauritania (H)	1	0	0	1	0	3	−3	0	Semi-finals
3	Liberia (D)	0	0	0	0	0	0	0	0	Disqualified (Note: On 3 October, Liberia were disqualified from the qualifiers after two of their players failed to pass the MRI test. After this, both of their matches were cancelled and the group standings was decided only by the first match played on 1 October between Mauritania and Sierra Leone.)

Rules for classification: Group tiebreakers
(D) Disqualified; (H) Hosts
Notes:
1 October 2022
18:00

Mauritania	0–3	Sierra Leone
	Report	Sesay 11', 32'; A. Bangura 48'

Stade Cheikha Ould Boïdiya, Nouakchott
Referee: Lenine dos Santos (Cape Verde)

Group B

Pos	Team	Pld	W	D	L	GF	GA	GD	Pts	Qualification
1	Mali	2	2	0	0	9	2	+7	6	Semi-finals
2	Senegal	2	1	0	1	7	2	+5	3	Semi-finals
3	Cape Verde	2	0	0	2	1	13	−12	0	

Rules for classification: Group tiebreakers
1 October 2022
21:00

Cape Verde	0–6	Senegal
	Report	I. Touré 11'; Sylla 35', 89'; Sadio 39'; A. Diouf 72', 82'

Stade Cheikha Ould Boïdiya, Nouakchott
Referee: Alhaji Kabia (Sierra Leone)

3 October 2022
18:00

Mali	7–1	Cape Verde
I. Diarra 8', 10', 44'; Tia 14'; Kanaté 66'; Barry 71'; Sissoko 89'	Report	B. Coulibaly 78' (o.g.)

Stade Cheikha Ould Boïdiya, Nouakchott
Referee: Stanley Konah (Liberia)

5 October 2022
18:00

Senegal	1–2	Mali
Sall 64'	Report	A. Diarra 20'; Tia 68'

Stade Cheikha Ould Boïdiya, Nouakchott
Referee: Mathioro Diabel (Mauritania)

=== Knockout stage ===
Semi-finals
7 October – Cheikha Boïdiya
Sierra Leone	0 (5)
Senegal (p)	0 (6)
7 October – Cheikha Boïdiya
Mali	2
Mauritania	0

Final
9 October – Cheikha Boïdiya
Senegal	1 (2)
Mali (p)	1 (4)

Semi-finals

Winners qualified for 2023 Africa U-17 Cup of Nations.

7 October 2022
18:00

Sierra Leone	0–0	Senegal
	Report
Penalties
S. Bangura (penalty scored); Bah (penalty missed); Al. Koroma (penalty scored); Ab. Koroma (penalty scored); Fornah (penalty scored); Al. Kamara (penalty scored); K. Conteh (penalty missed)	5–6	(penalty scored) F. Diouf; (penalty missed) A. Touré; (penalty scored) Diao; (penalty scored) A. Diouf; (penalty scored) I. Touré; (penalty scored) Dorival; (penalty scored) Sadio

Stade Cheikha Ould Boïdiya, Nouakchott
Referee: Raimundo Correia (Guinea-Bissau)
7 October 2022
21:00

Mali	2–0	Mauritania
I. Diarra 10'; A. Diarra 85'	Report

Stade Cheikha Ould Boïdiya, Nouakchott
Referee: Aïssatou Kanté (Guinea)

Final

9 October 2022
19:00

Senegal	1–1	Mali
A. Diouf 45'	Report	I. Diarra 53'
Penalties
F. Diouf (penalty scored); A. Touré (penalty missed); Diao (penalty missed); Diallo (penalty scored)	2–4	(penalty scored) Barry; (penalty scored) M. Traoré; (penalty scored) B. Coulibaly; (penalty scored) Kanaté

Stade Cheikha Ould Boïdiya, Nouakchott
Referee: Alhasan Bass (Gambia)

== West B Zone ==
The WAFU-UFOA Zone B qualifiers for the Africa U-17 Cup of Nations were hosted by Ghana with the matches played between 11 and 24 June 2022. The draw was announced on 15 April 2022.

All times are local, GMT (UTC±0).

=== Group stage ===
The seven teams were drawn into two groups of three and four teams. The winners and the runners-up of each group advanced to the semi-finals.

Group A

Pos	Team	Pld	W	D	L	GF	GA	GD	Pts	Qualification
1	Nigeria	2	2	0	0	7	3	+4	6	Semi-finals
2	Ghana (H)	2	1	0	1	5	4	+1	3	Semi-finals
3	Togo	2	0	0	2	1	6	−5	0	

Rules for classification: Group tiebreakers
(H) Hosts
11 June 2022
16:00

Ghana	2–4	Nigeria
Salifu 60'; Agyemang 89' (pen.)	Report	Michael 12'; Williams 42'; Azeez 52'; Eke 79'

Cape Coast Sports Stadium, Cape Coast
Referee: Daniel Luc Kassa (Benin)

14 June 2022
16:00

Nigeria	3–1	Togo
Iyede 11'; Williams 24'; Eke 82'	Report	Ahouankpo 75'

Cape Coast Sports Stadium, Cape Coast
Referee: Tuoniféré Soro (Ivory Coast)

17 June 2022
16:00

Togo	0–3	Ghana
	Report	Adua 54'; Salifu 77'; Agyemang 80' (pen.)

Cape Coast Sports Stadium, Cape Coast
Referee: Sadou Ali Brahamou (Niger)

Group B

Pos	Team	Pld	W	D	L	GF	GA	GD	Pts	Qualification
1	Burkina Faso	3	3	0	0	8	4	+4	9	Semi-finals
2	Ivory Coast	3	1	0	2	10	8	+2	3	Semi-finals
3	Benin	3	1	0	2	5	7	−2	3	
4	Niger	3	1	0	2	5	9	−4	3	

Rules for classification: Group tiebreakers
12 June 2022
16:00

Ivory Coast	2–3	Benin
Diomandé 12'; Baboni 80' (o.g.)	Report	Ouorou 45+2', 49'; Arouna 87'

Cape Coast Sports Stadium, Cape Coast
Referee: Benoît Bado (Burkina Faso)
12 June 2022
19:00

Burkina Faso	2–1	Niger
Camara 5'; Bougma 53'	Report	Djingarey 16'

Cape Coast Sports Stadium, Cape Coast
Referee: Julian Nunoo (Ghana)

15 June 2022
16:00

Niger	1–6	Ivory Coast
Issoufou 12'	Report	N'Goran 14'; Soro 17'; Gballou 26'; Diomandé 38', 45+1'; Doumbia 87'

Cape Coast Sports Stadium, Cape Coast
Referee: Abdulsalam Kassim (Nigeria)
15 June 2022
19:00

Benin	1–2	Burkina Faso
Seidou 15'	Report	Bougma 12'; Camara 51' (pen.)

Cape Coast Sports Stadium, Cape Coast
Referee: Gnama Aklesso (Togo)

18 June 2022
16:00

Niger	3–1	Benin
Issoufou 20'; Yacouba (?); ? (?)	Report	Arouna 34'

Nduom Sports Stadium, Elmina
18 June 2022
16:00

Ivory Coast	2–4	Burkina Faso
Soro 6' (pen.); Doumbia 60'	Report	Ouattara 67'; Camara 78', 82'; Ouédraogo 90+3'

Cape Coast Sports Stadium, Cape Coast
Referee: Julian Nunoo (Ghana)

=== Knockout stage ===
Semi-finals
21 June – Cape Coast Stadium
Nigeria	3
Ivory Coast	1
21 June – Cape Coast Stadium
Burkina Faso	1
Ghana	0

Final
24 June – Cape Coast Stadium
Nigeria	2
Burkina Faso	1
Third place
24 June – Cape Coast Stadium
Ivory Coast	2
Ghana	3

Semi-finals

Winners qualified for 2023 Africa U-17 Cup of Nations.

21 June 2022
15:00

Nigeria	3–1	Ivory Coast
Michael 31', 43'; Abdullahi 61'	Report	Diomandé 2' (pen.)

Cape Coast Sports Stadium, Cape Coast
Referee: Sadou Ali Brahamou (Niger)
21 June 2022
18:30

Burkina Faso	1–0	Ghana
Camara 65' (pen.)	Report

Cape Coast Sports Stadium, Cape Coast
Referee: Gnama Aklesso (Togo)

Third place

24 June 2022
15:00

Ivory Coast	2–3	Ghana
Diomandé 6' (pen.); Méïté 72'	Report	Adam 9' (pen.); Apokum 58'; Salifu 90+2'

Cape Coast Sports Stadium, Cape Coast
Referee: Benoît Bado (Burkina Faso)

Final

24 June 2022
18:30

Nigeria	2–1	Burkina Faso
Abdullahi 22', 48'	Report	Ouédraogo 42'

Cape Coast Sports Stadium, Cape Coast
Referee: Julian Nunoo (Ghana)

== Central Zone ==
The UNIFFAC qualifiers for the Africa U-17 Cup of Nations were planned to be held in Cameroon between 7–12 January 2023 but was postponed and eventually played between 12 and 18 January 2023 due to a number of players being deemed overage by the MRI tests for Chad, DR Congo and Cameroon.

Pos	Team	Pld	W	D	L	GF	GA	GD	Pts	Qualification
1	Cameroon (H)	2	2	0	0	6	0	+6	6	2023 Africa U-17 Cup of Nations
2	Congo	2	1	0	1	3	2	+1	3	2023 Africa U-17 Cup of Nations
3	Central African Republic	2	0	0	2	0	7	−7	0	

Rules for classification: Group tiebreakers
(H) Hosts
12 January 2023
17:00

Central African Republic	0–4	Cameroon
	Report	Akamba 35'; Abib 56'; Yondjo 70', 73'

Limbe Stadium, Limbé

15 January 2023
14:00

Cameroon	2–0	Congo
Yondjo 79'; Djibrin 90+5'	Report

Limbe Stadium, Limbé

18 January 2023
17:00

Congo	3–0	Central African Republic
Bizenga 36', 77'; Nzouzi 53'	Report

Limbe Stadium, Limbé

== Central-East Zone ==
The CECAFA qualifiers for the Africa U-17 Cup of Nations were hosted by Ethiopia, with the matches played between 2 and 19 October 2022. The draw was announced on 15 September 2022.

All times are local, EAT (UTC+3).

=== Group stage ===
The ten teams were initially drawn into two groups of five teams. Ethiopia, Tanzania, Somalia, South Sudan and Eritrea were drawn into Group A and Uganda, Djibouti, Sudan, Burundi and Rwanda were drawn into Group B. However, on 26 September, Eritrea and Rwanda withdrew from the competition, leaving both the groups with four teams. On 1 October, Djibouti and Sudan were disqualified from the tournament after some of their players failed the MRI test, leaving Group B with only two teams.

A redraw was then conducted on 2 October, with three teams drawn in two groups. The winners and the runners-up of each group advanced to the semi-finals.

Group A

Pos	Team	Pld	W	D	L	GF	GA	GD	Pts	Qualification
1	Tanzania	2	2	0	0	5	3	+2	6	Semi-finals
2	Somalia	2	1	0	1	2	2	0	3	Semi-finals
3	Ethiopia (H)	2	0	0	2	2	4	−2	0	

Rules for classification: Group tiebreakers
(H) Hosts
3 October 2022
16:00

Ethiopia	0–1	Somalia
	Report	A. Abdi 12'

Abebe Bikila Stadium, Addis Ababa
Referee: Djaffari Nduwimana (Burundi)

6 October 2022
16:00

Tanzania	3–2	Ethiopia
Otto 3', 15'; Iddi 87'	Report	Seyoum 9', 20'

Abebe Bikila Stadium, Addis Ababa
Referee: Jelly Chavani (South Africa)

9 October 2022
13:00

Somalia	1–2	Tanzania
Bilal 38'	Report	Otto 75', 79'

Abebe Bikila Stadium, Addis Ababa
Referee: Yasir Abdelaziz (Sudan)

Group B

Pos	Team	Pld	W	D	L	GF	GA	GD	Pts	Qualification
1	Uganda	2	2	0	0	8	1	+7	6	Semi-finals
2	South Sudan	2	0	1	1	2	5	−3	1	Semi-finals
3	Burundi	2	0	1	1	1	5	−4	1	

Rules for classification: Group tiebreakers
3 October 2022
13:00

Uganda	4–0	Burundi
Yiga 17', 45'; Nkoola 35'; Okello 55'	Report

Abebe Bikila Stadium, Addis Ababa
Referee: Abdulsalam Kassim (Nigeria)

6 October 2022
13:00

South Sudan	1–4	Uganda
Okenny 67'	Report	Nkoola 25', 51'; Sembuusi 37'; Walusimbi 45+1'

Abebe Bikila Stadium, Addis Ababa
Referee: Ahmed Arajiga (Tanzania)

9 October 2022
16:00

Burundi	1–1	South Sudan
Harimbabazi 65'	Report	Mabil 83'

Abebe Bikila Stadium, Addis Ababa
Referee: Shamirah Nabadda (Uganda)

=== Knockout stage ===
Semi-finals
12 October – Abebe Bikila Stadium
Uganda	1 (7)
Somalia (p)	1 (8)
12 October – Abebe Bikila Stadium
Tanzania	1 (3)
South Sudan (p)	1 (4)

Final
15 October – Abebe Bikila Stadium
Somalia	3
South Sudan	1
Third place
15 October – Abebe Bikila Stadium
Uganda	1 (1)
Tanzania (p)	1 (4)

Semi-finals

Winners qualified for 2023 Africa U-17 Cup of Nations.

12 October 2022
12:00

Uganda	1–1	Somalia
Ssemwogerere 42'	Report	A. Abdi 44'
Penalties
Yiga (penalty scored); Ssonko (penalty scored); Wandera (penalty scored); Walusimbi (penalty scored); Ssekajugo (penalty scored); Okello (penalty scored); Tumwesigye (penalty scored); Nkoola (penalty missed)	7–8	(penalty scored) Abdullahi; (penalty scored) Abdukadir; (penalty scored) Abdalla; (penalty scored) Bilal; (penalty scored) M. Abdi; (penalty scored) A. Abdi; (penalty scored) Nor; (penalty scored) Ali

Abebe Bikila Stadium, Addis Ababa
Referee: Tewodros Mitiku (Ethiopia)
12 October 2022
15:30

Tanzania	1–1	South Sudan
Charles 71'	Report	Gem 37'
Penalties
Omar (penalty scored); Farid (penalty scored); M. Salum (penalty scored); Hamisi (penalty missed); Charles (penalty missed)	3–4	(penalty missed) Obama; (penalty scored) Mabil; (penalty scored) Moses; (penalty scored) Taban; (penalty scored) Gem

Abebe Bikila Stadium, Addis Ababa
Referee: Abdulsalam Kassim (Nigeria)

Third place

15 October 2022
12:00

Uganda	1–1	Tanzania
Lubega 45+2'	Report	Omar 52'
Penalties
Yiga (penalty missed); Ssonko (penalty missed); Ouke (penalty scored)	1–4	(penalty scored) Omar; (penalty scored) M. Salum; (penalty scored) Kapil; (penalty scored) Farid

Abebe Bikila Stadium, Addis Ababa
Referee: Nasser Houssein (Djibouti)

Final

15 October 2022
15:00

Somalia	3–1	South Sudan
A. Abdi 6'; Dahir 59', 71'	Report	Minari 48'

Abebe Bikila Stadium, Addis Ababa
Referee: Shamirah Nabadda (Uganda)

== South Zone ==
The COSAFA qualifiers for the Africa U-17 Cup of Nations were played between 2 and 11 December 2022 in Malawi. The draw was announced on 4 November 2022.

All times are local, CAT (UTC+2).

=== Group stage ===
The nine teams were initially drawn into three groups of three teams. Malawi, Botswana and Namibia were drawn into Group A; Angola, South Africa and Mauritius were drawn into Group B; and Zambia, Mozambique and Seychelles were drawn into Group C.

However, a few days later, Mauritius withdrew from the competition, leaving Group B with only two teams. A redraw was then conducted on 29 November, with eight teams drawn into two groups of four teams. The winners and the runners-up of each group advanced to the semi-finals.

Group A

Pos	Team	Pld	W	D	L	GF	GA	GD	Pts	Qualification
1	Malawi (H)	2	1	1	0	4	3	+1	4	Semi-finals
2	Botswana	2	1	1	0	3	2	+1	4	Semi-finals
3	Namibia	2	0	0	2	1	3	−2	0	
4	Angola (D)	0	0	0	0	0	0	0	0	Disqualified (Note: On 1 December, Angola were disqualified from the qualifiers after a few of their players failed to pass the MRI test.)

Source: COSAFA.com
(D) Disqualified; (H) Hosts
Notes:
2 December 2022
20:00

Malawi	2–2	Botswana
Harrison 32'; Mhango 64'	Report	Ratshukudu 11'; Banda 47' (o.g.)

Bingu National Stadium, Lilongwe
Referee: Njaka Raharimanantsoa (Madagascar)

4 December 2022
15:30

Malawi	2–1	Namibia
Kanowa 37' (pen.); Mzunda 83'	Report	Nanuseb 27'

Bingu National Stadium, Lilongwe
Referee: Wilson Muianga (Mozambique)

6 December 2022
13:40

Namibia	0–1	Botswana
	Report	Ratshukudu 72'

Bingu National Stadium, Lilongwe
Referee: Darrio Landry (Seychelles)

Group B

Pos	Team	Pld	W	D	L	GF	GA	GD	Pts	Qualification
1	Zambia	3	3	0	0	9	1	+8	9	Semi-finals
2	South Africa	3	2	0	1	12	1	+11	6	Semi-finals
3	Mozambique	3	0	1	2	0	2	−2	1	
4	Seychelles	3	0	1	2	1	18	−17	1	

Source: COSAFA.com
3 December 2022
15:30

Seychelles	0–11	South Africa
	Report	Mabena 4', 9', 26', 45+2', 74'; Lee 10'; Mokoena 25'; Wallis 48', 52', 90+2' (pen.); Manyana 57'

Bingu National Stadium, Lilongwe
Referee: Thokozani Dlamini (Eswatini)
3 December 2022
18:30

Zambia	1–0	Mozambique
Zimba 55'	Report

Bingu National Stadium, Lilongwe
Referee: Godfrey Nkhakananga (Malawi)

5 December 2022
15:30

Mozambique	0–1	South Africa
	Report	Mabena 62'

Bingu National Stadium, Lilongwe
Referee: Thembinkosi Dlamini (Eswatini)
5 December 2022
18:30

Zambia	7–1	Seychelles
Mwanza 33', 42', 74', 86', 90'; Kapowa 37'; Phiri 64'	Report	Hoareau 77'

Bingu National Stadium, Lilongwe
Referee: Eness Gumbo (Malawi)

7 December 2022
19:00

Seychelles	0–0	Mozambique
	Report

Bingu National Stadium, Lilongwe
Referee: Samuel Nghipandulwa (Namibia)
7 December 2022
21:30

South Africa	0–1	Zambia
	Report	Zimba 49'

Bingu National Stadium, Lilongwe
Referee: Wilson Muianga (Mozambique)

=== Knockout stage ===
Semi-finals
9 December – Bingu National
Zambia	4
Botswana	2
9 December – Bingu National
Malawi	1
South Africa	5

Final
11 December – Bingu National
Zambia	1
South Africa	0
Third place
11 December – Bingu National
Botswana	2
Malawi	5

Semi-finals

Winners qualified for 2023 Africa U-17 Cup of Nations.

9 December 2022
18:30

Zambia	4–2	Botswana
Malaya 31'; Kapowa 45', 86'; Zimba 70'	Report	Manapolo 51' (pen.); Ratshukudu 58'

Bingu National Stadium, Lilongwe
Referee: Godfrey Nkhakananga (Malawi)
9 December 2022
21:30

Malawi	1–5	South Africa
Mkandawire 52'	Report	Sibiya 31'; Mabena 46', 86' (pen.), 90'; Lee 74'

Bingu National Stadium, Lilongwe
Referee: Wilson Muianga (Mozambique)

Third place

11 December 2022
12:00

Botswana	2–5	Malawi
Ratshukudu 58'; Matakula 79'	Report	Mkandawire 4'; Mzunda 20', 66', 90'; Harrison 42'

Bingu National Stadium, Lilongwe
Referee: Wilson Muianga (Mozambique)

Final

11 December 2022
17:30

Zambia	1–0	South Africa
Phiri 60'	Report

Bingu National Stadium, Lilongwe
Referee: Godfrey Nkhakananga (Malawi)

== Qualified teams ==
The following 12 teams qualified for the final tournament. However, South Sudan was disqualified from the tournament after 5 players failed the MRI test.

Team	Zone	Qualified on	Previous appearances in Africa U-17 Cup of Nations^{1} only final tournament era (since 1995)
Algeria (hosts)	North Zone	17 May 2021	1 (2009)
Nigeria	West B Zone	21 June 2022	9 (1995, 1999, **2001**, 2003, 2005, **2007**, 2013, 2015, 2019)
Burkina Faso	West B Zone	21 June 2022	6 (1999, 2001, 2005, 2007, 2009, **2011**)
Senegal	West A Zone	7 October 2022	2 (2011, 2019)
Mali	West A Zone	7 October 2022	8 (1995, 1997, 1999, 2001, 2005, 2011, **2015**, **2017**)
Somalia	Central-East Zone	12 October 2022	0 (debut)
~~South Sudan~~	Central-East Zone	12 October 2022	0 (debut)
Morocco	North Zone	14 November 2022	2 (2013, 2019)
Zambia	South Zone	9 December 2022	1 (2015)
South Africa	South Zone	9 December 2022	3 (2005, 2007, 2015)
Cameroon	Central Zone	15 January 2023	7 (1999, 2001, **2003**, 2009, 2015, 2017, **2019**)
Congo	Central Zone	18 January 2023	2 (2011, 2013)

^{1} Bold indicates champions for that year. Italic indicates hosts for that year.

== Goalscorers ==
There were 185 goals scored in 52 matches, for an average of 3.56 goals per match.

9 goals

- (South Africa) Siyabonga Mabena

5 goals

- (Burkina Faso) Ousmane Camara
- (Ivory Coast) Yan Diomandé
- (Mali) Ibrahim Diarra
- (Zambia) Emmanuel Mwanza

4 goals

- (Botswana) Losika Ratshukudu
- (Malawi) Webster Mzunda
- (Tanzania) Sylvester Otto

3 goals

- (Cameroon) Dorinel Yondjo
- (Ghana) Abdul-Razak Salifu
- (Nigeria) Abubakar Abdullahi
- (Nigeria) Emmanuel Michael
- (Senegal) Amara Diouf
- (Somalia) Abdihafid Abdi
- (South Africa) Benjamin Wallis
- (Uganda) Arafat Nkoola
- (Zambia) Lutetekelo Kapowa
- (Zambia) Marcel Zimba

2 goals

- (Benin) Abdou-Faridou Arouna
- (Benin) Yamirou Ouorou
- (Burkina Faso) Apollinaire Bougma
- (Burkina Faso) Abdramane Ouédraogo
- (Republic of the Congo) Bienvenu Bizenga
- (Egypt) Ayman Abdel-Aziz
- (Ethiopia) Biruk Seyoum
- (Ghana) Collins Agyemang
- (Ivory Coast) Abdoulaye Doumbia
- (Ivory Coast) Nambagui Soro
- (Malawi) Vincent Harrison
- (Malawi) Lucky Mkandawire
- (Mali) Aboubacar Diarra
- (Mali) Ange Tia
- (Morocco) Abdelhamid Maali
- (Niger) Yanis Issoufou
- (Nigeria) Light Eke
- (Nigeria) Daniel Sesay
- (Senegal) Mactar Sylla
- (Sierra Leone) Wissam Chaouali
- (Somalia) Abdirahin Dahir
- (South Africa) Dhakier Lee
- (Tunisia) Nacim Dendani
- (Uganda) Alex Yiga
- (Zambia) Kelvin Phiri

1 goal

- (Benin) Taofik Seidou
- (Botswana) Boniface Manapolo
- (Botswana) Boikobo Matakula
- (Burkina Faso) Sie Ouattara
- (Burundi) Ramadhan Harimbabazi
- (Cameroon) Tizé Abib
- (Cameroon) Collins Akamba
- (Cameroon) Harouna Djibrin
- (Republic of the Congo) Ayel Nzouzi
- (Egypt) Hossam Abdelkarim
- (Egypt) Omar Moawad
- (Egypt) Omar Mohamed
- (Ghana) Abdul Rashid Adam
- (Ghana) Pius Adua
- (Ghana) Richard Apokum
- (Ivory Coast) Aboubacar Méïté
- (Ivory Coast) Inza Gballou
- (Ivory Coast) Emmanuel N'Goran
- (Libya) Sanad Kerwash
- (Libya) Abdel Moamen Al Mabrouk
- (Libya) Ahmed Al Mesmari
- (Libya) Marwan Al Zakouzi
- (Malawi) Blessings Kanowa
- (Malawi) Mwisho Mhango
- (Mali) Mahamoud Barry
- (Mali) Ibrahim Kanaté
- (Mali) Modibo Sissoko
- (Morocco) Adam Ashtar
- (Morocco) Ismail Bakhti
- (Morocco) Aiman Nair
- (Namibia) Dorian Nanuseb
- (Niger) ?
- (Niger) Mohamed Yacouba
- (Niger) Ibrahim Djingarey
- (Nigeria) Jubril Azeez
- (Nigeria) Kevwe Iyede
- (Senegal) Lamine Sadio
- (Senegal) Omar Sall
- (Senegal) Issa Touré
- (Seychelles) Lorenzo Hoareau
- (Sierra Leone) Abu Bakarr Bangura
- (Somalia) Idris Bilal
- (South Africa) Xhosa Manyana
- (South Africa) Bennet Mokoena
- (South Africa) Thato Sibiya
- (South Sudan) Jonathan Gem
- (South Sudan) David Mabil
- (South Sudan) Ajo Minari
- (South Sudan) Abraham Okenny
- (Tanzania) Yasin Charles
- (Tanzania) Idrisa Iddi
- (Tanzania) Ally Omar
- (Togo) Komi Ahouankpo
- (Tunisia) Anas Amdouni
- (Tunisia) Moncef Al Gharbi
- (Uganda) Farouk Lubega
- (Uganda) Richard Okello
- (Uganda) Patrick Sembuusi
- (Uganda) Jamal Ssemwogerere
- (Uganda) Abubakali Walusimbi
- (Zambia) Samson Malaya

1 own goal

- (Benin) Abdalath Baboni (against Ivory Coast)
- (Malawi) Julius Banda (against Botswana)
- (Mali) Baye Coulibaly (against Cape Verde)

== See also ==
- 2023 Africa U-20 Cup of Nations qualification
