= Emmanuel Michael =

Nigerian footballer (born 2006)

Personal information
- Date of birth: 16 June 2006 (age 20)
- Place of birth: Nigeria
- Position: Full-back

Team information
- Current team: Admira Wacker (on loan from LASK)
- Number: 41

Youth career
- Simoiben Football Academy

Senior career*
Years	Team	Apps	(Gls)
2023–2024	Simoiben	0	(0)
2023–2024	→ Gombe United (loan)	6	(1)
2024–2025	Juniors OÖ	2	(0)
2025–	LASK	8	(0)
2026–	→ Admira Wacker (loan)	1	(0)

International career
2022–2023	Nigeria U17	8	(3)
- * Club domestic league appearances and goals as of 22 March 2026

Emmanuel Michael (born 16 June 2006) is a Nigerian professional footballer who plays as a full-back for 2. Liga club Admira Wacker, on loan from LASK.

== Club career ==
Michael was scouted by the Simoiben Football Academy when he was playing barefoot on the streets of Kaduna. Following impressive performances with the academy and Nigeria's under-17 side, he was scouted by Danish and Spanish sides Midtjylland and Huesca, respectively. He was also approached by Dutch side Ajax and French side Monaco, respectively, with the latter reportedly making a bid to sign him before he turned eighteen.

Despite this interest, he joined Nigeria Premier Football League side Gombe United on a year-long loan deal in October 2023. In the same month, he was named by English newspaper The Guardian as one of the best players born in 2006 worldwide.

In August 2024, he joined Austrian side LASK, being assigned to the club's 'B' team, Juniors OÖ. In July 2026, he joined Austrian 2. Liga club Admira Wacker on loan for the 2026–27 season.

== International career ==
Called up to the Nigerian under-17 squad for 2023 U-17 Africa Cup of Nations qualification (named the 2022 WAFU-B U17), Michael scored in the opening game, a 4–2 win against Ghana. He followed this up with a brace in a 3–1 win against the Ivory Coast, earning three consecutive Man of the Match awards.

Having helped his side win the 2022 WAFU-B U17, he was honoured by his teammates at the Simoiben Football Academy on his return to Nigeria. It was later revealed that he almost missed the tournament; having arrived late to a training camp, the Nigerian coaches initially wanted him excluded from the team, but after a meeting between president of the Nigeria Football Federation, Ibrahim Musa Gusau, and the owner of Simoiben Football Academy, Nigeria international Moses Simon, he was reinstated.

He was called up to the provisional under-20 squad for the 2023 African Games, but missed out on the final squad due to an ankle injury.

== Style of play ==
A free-kick specialist, Michael credited Nigerian international Moses Simon for providing him with boots after he scored from a free-kick in Nigeria under-17's win against Ghana in qualification for the 2023 U-17 Africa Cup of Nations. He scored a further two free-kicks in a 3–1 win against Ivory Coast in the same qualification tournament.

== Career statistics ==
=== Club ===
As of match played 9 August 2026

Appearances and goals by club, season and competition
Club	Season	League			National cup (Note: Includes Austrian Cup)		Total	
Club	Season	Division	Apps	Goals	Apps	Goals	Apps	Goals
Gombe United (loan)	2023–24	NPFL	6	1	0	0	6	1
Juniors OÖ	2024–25	Regionalliga Central	2	0	–		2	0
LASK	2024–25	Austrian Bundesliga	1	0	0	0	1	0
LASK	2025–26	Austrian Bundesliga	7	0	2	0	9	0
LASK	Total		8	0	2	0	10	0
Admira Wacker (loan)	2026–27	Austrian Football Second League	1	0	0	0	1	0
Career total			17	1	2	0	19	1

== Honours ==
LASK

- Austrian Bundesliga: 2025–26
- Austrian Cup: 2025–26
