= Adam Boufandar =

Moroccan footballer (born 2006)

Adam Boufandar آدم بوفندار
Personal information
- Date of birth: 11 August 2006 (age 20)
- Place of birth: Savigliano, Italy
- Height: 1.87 m (6 ft 2 in)
- Position: Defensive midfielder

Team information
- Current team: Pro Vercelli
- Number: 41

Youth career
- Juventus

Senior career*
Years	Team	Apps	(Gls)
2026–	Pro Vercelli	6	(0)

International career^{‡}
2023	Morocco U17	14	(0)
2024	Morocco U18	3	(0)
2024–	Morocco U20	1	(0)
- * Club domestic league appearances and goals as of 30 April 2026 ‡ National team caps and goals as of 8 September 2024

Adam Boufandar (Arabic: آدم بوفندار; born 11 August 2006) is a footballer who plays as a defensive midfielder for Serie C Group A club Pro Vercelli. Born in Italy, he represents Morocco at youth international level.

== Early life ==
Boufandar was born in Savigliano, Italy, to a Moroccan father and a Polish mother.

== Club career ==
On 30 January 2026, Boufandar signed a two-and-a-half-year contract with Serie C club Pro Vercelli.

== International career ==
Eligible to represent Italy, Poland and Morocco through his parents, Boufandar was first called up to the Moroccan under-17 team in March 2023, making his debut in a 1–1 friendly draw against Burkina Faso, before also playing in games against Togo and Senegal, scoring against the latter. Following the games, he stated that he was very happy to represent Morocco at youth level, and hoped to one day play for the full national team. He reportedly turned down a call-up to the Italian under-17 team for the 2023 UEFA European Under-17 Championship, opting instead to represent Morocco at youth international level. He was called up to the Morocco squad for the 2023 Africa U-17 Cup of Nations.
