= Angel Yondjo =

Cameroonian footballer (born 2007)

Personal information
- Full name: Dorinel Angel Yondjo Matah
- Date of birth: 10 February 2007 (age 19)
- Place of birth: Douala, Cameroon
- Height: 1.77 m (5 ft 10 in)
- Position: Centre-forward

Team information
- Current team: Lille B

Youth career
- Brasseries

Senior career*
Years	Team	Apps	(Gls)
2025–	Lille B	20	(10)
2026–	Lille	1	(0)

International career^{‡}
2023	Cameroon U17	4	(3)
2024–	Cameroon U20	3	(2)
2026–	Cameroon	3	(0)
- * Club domestic league appearances and goals as of 25 October 2026 ‡ National team caps and goals as of 4 October 2026

Dorinel Angel Yondjo Matah (born 10 February 2007) is a Cameroonian footballer who plays as a forward for Lille B and the Cameroon national team.

== Club career ==
Born in Douala, Yondjo comes from the Brasseries Academy in his hometown.

In 2024, Ligue 1 clubs had reportedly shown interest in Yondjo.

== International career ==
Yondjo is a youth international for Cameroon, having played for the under-17 team, with whom he won the UNIFFAC Cup in January 2023 as the best player and top goalscorer, scoring 3 goals and providing 2 assists. This regional tournament allowed them to qualify for the following U17 continental cup.

He hence took part in the 2023 U-17 Africa Cup of Nations, where he was his team only goalscorer as they exited in the pool stage.

In July 2024, he was called with the Cameroon under-20 team at age 17 in preparation for the upcoming UNIFFAC continental qualifying. In this qualification tournament taking place in Brazzaville, he scored again, and was named man of the match in a 3–1 win against Gabon. His team was knocked out via penalty shout-out by RD Congo, after a 1–1 draw where Yondjo was his team's scorer, exiting the 2025 Africa Cup of Nations.

Yondjo was called up to the Cameroon national team for a set of 2026 FIFA Series matches in March 2026.

== Career statistics ==
=== Club ===
As of match played 25 October 2026

Appearances and goals by club, season and competition
Club	Season	League			Cup		Europe		Other		Total	
Club	Season	Division	Apps	Goals	Apps	Goals	Apps	Goals	Apps	Goals	Apps	Goals
Lille B	2025–26	CFA 2	18	8	—		—		—		18	8
Lille B	2026–26	CFA 2	2	2	—		—		—		2	2
Lille B	Total		20	10	—		—		—		20	10
Lille	2026–27	Ligue 1	1	0	0	0	0	0	—		1	0
Career total			19	8	0	0	0	0	0	0	19	8

=== International ===
As of match played 4 October 2026

Appearances and goals by national team and year
National team	Year	Apps	Goals
Cameroon	2026	3	0
Total		3	0
