= Amirmohammad Razzaghinia =

Iranian footballer

Personal information
- Date of birth: 11 April 2006 (age 20)
- Place of birth: Yazd, Iran
- Height: 1.86 m (6 ft 1 in)
- Position: Midfielder

Team information
- Current team: Esteghlal
- Number: 8

Youth career
- –2023: FC KIA

Senior career*
Years	Team	Apps	(Gls)
2023–2024	FC KIA		
2024–2025	Gol Gohar	23	(2)
2025–	Esteghlal	32	(0)

International career^{‡}
2023–2024	Iran U17	17	(5)
2024–2025	Iran U20	8	(1)
2025–	Iran U23	9	(2)
2025–	Iran	6	(0)
- * Club domestic league appearances and goals as of 7 November 2026 ‡ National team caps and goals as of 17 November 2026

Amirmohammad Razzaghinia (Persian: امیرمحمد رزاقی‌نیا; born 11 April 2006) is an Iranian footballer who plays as a midfielder for Persian Gulf Pro League team Esteghlal, and the Iran national team.

== Youth career ==
=== KIA Football Academy ===
Born in Yazd, Razzaghinia was recruited to the country's most prestigious football academy, KIA Football Academy, where he progressed through the ranks to eventually play in League 2.

== Club career ==
=== Gol Gohar ===
Razzaghinia signed for Persian Gulf Pro League side Gol Gohar on a free transfer in 2024. He played 23 games in the league, scoring 2 goals.

=== Esteghlal ===
The following season, Razzaghinia signed for Esteghlal. He made 21 appearances in the league, before the season was suspended due to the 2026 Iran war.

== International career ==
Razzaghinia has been a part of several youth national teams for Iran.

He was a part of the Iran U17 squad for the 2023 FIFA U-17 World Cup. He made 8 appearances for the U17 team, scoring 5 goals, including a brace against Belarus. Razzaghinia has also represented Iran U20, and Iran U23.

Razzaghinia was included in the Iran senior squad for their finalqualifying match against North Korea. Razzaghinia was included in Iran's preliminary squad for the 2026 FIFA World Cup, before being named in the final 26-man squad in June.

== Career statistics ==
As of 7 November 2026

Club	Season	League			Cup		Continental		Total	
Club	Season	League	Apps	Goals	Apps	Goals	Apps	Goals	Apps	Goals
Gol Gohar	2024–25	Persian Gulf Pro League	23	2	3	0	0	0	26	2
Esteghlal	2025–26	Persian Gulf Pro League	21	0	2	0	6	0	29	0
Esteghlal	2026–27	Persian Gulf Pro League	11	0	0	0	4	0	15	0
Esteghlal	Total		32	0	2	0	10	0	44	0
Career Total			55	2	5	0	10	0	70	2

=== International ===
As of match played on 17 November 2026

Appearances and goals by national team and year
National team	Year	Apps	Goals
Iran	2025	1	0
Iran	2026	5	0
Total		6	0
