= Abubakar Abdullahi =

Nigerian footballer (born 2006)

Personal information
- Full name: Abubakar Idris Abdullahi
- Date of birth: 27 January 2006 (age 20)
- Height: 1.78 m (5 ft 10 in)
- Position: Forward

Team information
- Current team: Gent/Jong Gent
- Number: 61

Youth career
- Jega United

Senior career*
Years	Team	Apps	(Gls)
2024–	Jong Gent	68	(21)
2026–	Gent	0	(0)

International career
2022–2023	Nigeria U17	8	(5)
- * Club domestic league appearances and goals as of 16 August 2026

Abubakar Idris Abdullahi (born 27 January 2006) is a Nigerian footballer who plays as a forward for Belgian Pro League club Gent and their reserve team Jong Gent in Challenger Pro League.

== Club career ==
After his performances for the Nigeria under-17 side, Abdullahi was linked with a move away from Kebbi State-based Jega United, with Portuguese club Porto being touted as suitors. Despite impressing on trial, he instead joined Belgian side Gent in January 2024, being assigned to their reserve side.

Abdullahi was first included into the senior squad of Gent in the summer of 2026 for their Conference League qualifying campaign.

== International career ==
Abdullahi was called up to the Nigeria under-17 side for 2023 U-17 Africa Cup of Nations qualification (named the 2022 WAFU-B U17), and scored three goals to help Nigeria win the tournament, including a brace in the final against Burkina Faso. He was called up again for the 2023 U-17 Africa Cup of Nations, scoring in the group stage against South Africa, but could not prevent Nigeria being knocked out in the quarter-finals, despite scoring in a 2–1 loss to Burkina Faso.

== Career statistics ==
=== Club ===
As of 11 October 2024

Appearances and goals by club, season and competition
Club	Season	League			Cup		Other		Total	
Club	Season	Division	Apps	Goals	Apps	Goals	Apps	Goals	Apps	Goals
Jong Gent	2023–24	Eerste Nationale	15	2	–		0	0	15	2
Jong Gent	2024–25	Eerste Nationale	6	4	–		0	0	6	4
Career total			21	6	0	0	0	0	21	6
