= Michael Dokunmu =

South African soccer player (born 2006)

Personal information
- Full name: Michael Folabi Dokunmu
- Date of birth: 9 April 2006 (age 20)
- Place of birth: Kimberley, South Africa
- Height: 1.86 m (6 ft 1 in)
- Position: Midfielder

Team information
- Current team: De Graafschap (Under-21)

Youth career
- Little Kickers
- Old Parks
- Randburg FC
- SuperSport United
- 2020–2025: Vitesse
- 2025–: De Graafschap

Senior career*
Years	Team	Apps	(Gls)
2024–2025	Vitesse	2	(0)

International career^{‡}
2023	South Africa U17	4	(1)
- * Club domestic league appearances and goals as of 16 May 2025 ‡ National team caps and goals as of 10 May 2023

Michael Folabi Dokunmu (born 9 April 2006) is a South African professional soccer player who plays as a midfielder for the Under-21 squad of Dutch club De Graafschap. He is regarded as a promising young player in South Africa.

== Early life ==
Dokunmu was born in Kimberley, South Africa, to a Nigerian father and a South African mother.

== Club career ==
Dokunmu started his career at a number of youth clubs in South Africa before joining professional side SuperSport United. In December 2019, his mother accepted a job in the Netherlands, and Dokunmu's family moved to the country.

The following summer, he went on trial with Eredivisie side Vitesse, before being accepted into their academy. He signed his first professional contract with the club in August 2022. He became Vitesse's third-youngest debutant, behind Brahim Darri and Mitchell van Bergen, when he appeared in a friendly game against SC Heerenveen.

== International career ==
Eligible to represent South Africa and Nigeria through his parents, as well as the Netherlands, he was called up to the under-17 side of the latter for a training camp in January 2023. However, in April of the same year, he switched his international allegiance to South Africa, and was called up to their under-17 side ahead of the 2023 U-17 Africa Cup of Nations. He stated that he had chosen to represent South Africa as it was his birthplace, and that he hoped to represent the nation's senior squad in future.

== Personal life ==
His brother, Ethan, is also a footballer, and currently also plays in the academy of Vitesse.
