= Amara Diouf =

Senegalese footballer (born 2008)

Personal information
- Full name: Amara Hady Diouf
- Date of birth: 7 June 2008 (age 18)
- Place of birth: Pikine, Senegal
- Height: 1.74 m (5 ft 9 in)
- Position: Winger

Team information
- Current team: Fenerbahçe
- Number: 30

Youth career
- 2017–2023: Génération Foot

Senior career*
Years	Team	Apps	(Gls)
2023–2026	Génération Foot	1	(0)
2026–	Fenerbahçe	0	(0)

International career^{‡}
2022–	Senegal U17	10	(8)
2023–	Senegal U20	2	(1)
2023–	Senegal	2	(0)
Medal record
Men's football
Representing Senegal
U-17 Africa Cup of Nations
Winner	2023 Algeria
- * Club domestic league appearances and goals as of 15:00, 24 June 2026 (UTC) ‡ National team caps and goals as of 00:04, 1 May 2026 (UTC)

Amara Hady Diouf (born 7 June 2008) is a Senegalese professional footballer who plays as a winger for Süper Lig club Fenerbahçe.

== Club career ==
=== Youth career ===
Born in Pikine, in Dakar's suburbs, Amara Diouf joined the Génération Foot academy in 2017, after impressing in the Danone Nations Cup.

In 2023, he was a standout in the Mohammed VI under-19s tournament in Morocco, where Génération Foot won the competition, after eliminating the likes of Real Madrid. It was reported that Diouf will join Metz when he came of age, following the same path as his compatriot Sadio Mané.

=== Génération Foot ===
Diouf was promoted to the first team of Génération Foot at the age of fourteen on 14 November 2022 after signing a contract lasting until 2028, and he won the Ligue 1 (Senegal) in his first season at the club. The deal was initially set to end in 2026, but an "unconditional mandatory extension option" was triggered during the 2023–24 season without the knowledge of Diouf. As a result, Diouf’s legal advisors successfully argued that forcing a fourteen-year-old into a six-year long binding commitment violated international football law.

He was then permanently promoted to the first team ahead of the 2023–24 season, and he made his debut for the club on 20 August 2023 during the 0–0 draw against Guinée Championnat National club Hafia during the 2023–24 CAF Champions League first qualifying round. He also made one appearance in Ligue 1 during the 2023–24 season.

He then was unable to play during the 2024–25 season due to an anterior cruciate ligament injury; his contract was terminated on 4 November 2024 but he trained with the club until June 2026.

=== Fenerbahçe ===
He was expected to join Fenerbahçe ahead of the 2026–27 Süper Lig season, but the move was suspended in March 2026 after he underwent cruciate ligament surgery. Amara Diouf was registered as a free agent until he returned to Génération Foot in March 2026.

On 24 June 2026, he signed a five-year professional contract with Fenerbahçe until the end of 2030–31 season, joining his compatriot and childhood friend Abdou Aziz Fall.

== International career ==
=== Youth ===
In 2022, Diouf had joined the Senegal National U17 team following the qualification matches for the 2023 U-17 Africa Cup of Nations. He scored a brace against Cape Verde and a goal against Mali, scored 5 goals in six games and been topscorer of the tournament.

Diouf was called up to the 2023 U-17 Africa Cup of Nations. He had scored a brace against Algeria and a goal against Somalia which ultimately helped Senegal qualify for the knockout stage. After a great performance, Diouf was elected best player of the group stage and was a part of the group stage best starting XI. Diouf went on to score a brace against South Africa in the quarter-finals, qualifying his team for the 2023 U-17 World Cup and getting his third man of the match accolade. Having scored his 5th goal in the competition, he surpassed Victor Osimhen's record of most goals scored in one edition of the under-17 cup. In the semi-final against Burkina Faso, Diouf missed a penalty while his team was leading 1–0, but eventually proved to be decisive in the penalty shoot-out, scoring his team last winning goal. Senegal went on to defeat Morocco in the finals to win tournament for their first time. With five goals in the tournament, Diouf won the Golden Boot.

=== Senior ===
In August 2023, Diouf was called up to the senior squad to face Rwanda in the African Cup of Nations qualifiers and a friendly against Algeria. On 9 September, he made his debut in the 1–1 draw against Rwanda, to be his country's youngest debutant, aged 15 years and 94 days.

== Personal life ==
His father Ady was also a footballer and he played for US Gorée, ASFA Dakar, and SODIFITEX de Tambacounda.

== Career statistics ==
=== Club ===
As of 24 June 2026

Appearances and goals by club, season and competition
Club	Season	League			National cup (Note: Includes Senegal FA Cup, Turkish Cup)		Continental		Other		Total	
Club	Season	Division	Apps	Goals	Apps	Goals	Apps	Goals	Apps	Goals	Apps	Goals
Génération Foot	2022–23	Senegal Ligue 1	0	0	—		—		—		0	0
Génération Foot	2023–24	Senegal Ligue 1	1	0	0	0	2 (Note: Appearance in CAF Champions League)	0	1 (Note: Appearance in Trophée des Champions)	0	4	0
Génération Foot	2024–25	Senegal Ligue 1	—		—		—		—		0	0
Génération Foot	2025–26	Senegal Ligue 1	0	0	—		—		—		0	0
Fenerbahçe	2026–27	Süper Lig	0	0	0	0	0	0	0	0	0	0
Career total			1	0	0	0	2	0	1	0	4	0

=== International ===
As of match played 26 March 2024

Appearances and goals by national team and year
National team	Year	Apps	Goals
Senegal	2023	1	0
Senegal	2024	1	0
Total		2	0

== Honours ==
Génération Foot

- Senegal Ligue 1: 2022–23
- Trophée des Champions runner-up: 2023

Senegal U17

- U-17 Africa Cup of Nations: 2023

Individual

- U-17 Africa Cup of Nations Golden Boot: 2023
