= Mustafa Alio =

Canadian activist, refugee, and writer

Mustafa Alio M.S.D.
- Born: Latakia, Syria
- Citizenship: Canada
- Known for: Refugee activism

Mustafa Alio is a Toronto-based activist, writer, refugee, and the co-founder of the Jumpstart Refugee Talent program.

== Life before immigrating ==
Alio worked for Syriatel, based in Latakia, Syria and moved to Canada in 2007.

== In Canada ==
In Toronto, Alio studied marketing management and financial services, while also working at Naz's Falafel House.

Upon graduation, he worked as financial adviser at a major bank in Toronto.

In 2012, after receiving threats from people in Syria, Alio applied for permanent residency, but was rejected by Canadian immigration authorities. He subsequently requested and received political asylum.

In 2018 he was part of a group that signed an open letter calling for calm after Syrian refugee Ibrahim Ali was arrested and charged for the murder of Marrisa Shen.

Alio was part of the Canadian delegation at the Global Refugee Forum in Geneva. According to Professor James Milner of the Local Engagement Refugee Research Network, "It's unprecedented to have a refugee sitting there as a national delegate."

Alio co-founded the Jumpstart Refugee Talent program to help refugees integrate and get jobs in Canada and also co-founded Refugees Seeking Equal Access at The Table (R-SEAT).

In 2021 he was the recipient of the Governor Generals Meritorious Service Decoration "For founding Jumpstart Refugee Talent to help newcomers enter the job market, become contributing citizens and start to rebuild their lives."
