= Abdou Aziz Fall =

Senegalese footballer (born 2007)

Personal information
- Full name: Abdou Aziz Fall
- Date of birth: 20 February 2007 (age 19)
- Place of birth: Mbour, Senegal
- Height: 1.80 m (5 ft 11 in)
- Position: Defensive midfielder

Team information
- Current team: Fenerbahçe

Youth career
- 2023–2025: Keur Madior FC
- 2025: Essamaye FC
- 2025–: Fenerbahçe

Senior career*
Years	Team	Apps	(Gls)
2025–	Fenerbahçe	0	(0)

International career
2023	Senegal U17	6	(1)
Medal record
Men's football
Representing Senegal
U-17 Africa Cup of Nations
Winner	2023 Algeria
- * Club domestic league appearances and goals as of 27 October 2025

Abdou Aziz Fall (born 20 February 2007) is a Senegalese professional footballer who plays as a defensive midfielder for Süper Lig club Fenerbahçe.

== Club career ==
=== Early career ===
Abdou Aziz Fall started playing football like many young Senegalese players in the streets. He later joined Keur Madior FC, where he played with the academy in Mbour.

In February 2025, Abdou Aziz Fall left Keur Madior FC, to join Essamaye FC, a Ziguinchor football club newly promoted to Ligue 2.

=== Fenerbahçe ===
On 11 July 2025, Fenerbahçe announced his transfer until the end of 2029–2030 season.

On 23 August 2025, he made his Fenerbahçe U19 debut in a U19 Süper Lig match against Kocaelispor U19, which they won 4–1.

== International career ==
In 2023, Fall had joined the Senegal U17 team for the 2023 U-17 Africa Cup of Nations, scored against Burkina Faso in semi-final and helped team for up to the final.

== Style of play ==
A versatile player, Aziz Fall can operate either as a defensive midfielder or a deep-lying playmaker.

== Honours ==
Senegal U17

- U-17 Africa Cup of Nations: 2023

Individual

- U-17 Africa Cup of Nations Best XI: 2023
