= Ousmane Camara (footballer, born 2006) =

Burkinabé footballer (born 2006)

Personal information
- Date of birth: 1 January 2006 (age 20)
- Place of birth: Sabalibougou, Mali
- Height: 1.81 m (5 ft 11 in)
- Position: Forward

Team information
- Current team: RFC Liège
- Number: 24

Youth career
- Rahimo

Senior career*
Years	Team	Apps	(Gls)
2022–2024	Rahimo	8	(0)
2024–2026	Riga	0	(0)
2024–2026	→ Auda (loan)	45	(5)
2026–	RFC Liège	6	(0)

International career^{‡}
2022–2023	Burkina Faso U17	9	(6)
2024–	Burkina Faso	6	(0)
- * Club domestic league appearances and goals as of 19 September 2026 ‡ National team caps and goals as of 3 October 2026

Ousmane Camara (born 1 January 2006) is a footballer who plays as a forward for Challenger Pro League club RFC Liège in Belgium. Born in Mali, he represents Burkina Faso internationally.

== Club career ==
On 11 October 2023, Camara was named by English newspaper The Guardian as one of the best players born in 2006 worldwide.

On 10 January 2024, Latvian Higher League side Riga FC announced the signing on Kamara.

== International career ==
Camara was born and raised in Mali where he played for Sadio Diarra Center academy. He was released in 2017 where he then joined Rahimo FC in Burkina Faso. Camara was called up to the Burkina Faso under-17 squad after obtaining a Burkinabe passport ahead of 2023 U-17 Africa Cup of Nations qualification, which doubled as a mini-tournament for teams in the West African Football Union. Having scored five goals in five games, including a brace against the Ivory Coast, he was unable to help Burkina Faso win the tournament, as they were defeated 2–1 by Nigeria.

Despite this loss, Burkina Faso still qualified for the 2023 U-17 Africa Cup of Nations. Having lost their opening game to Mali, a 2–1 win over Cameroon helped them to the next round, though Camara was suspended for the quarter-final match against Nigeria, having been booked in both of the previous games. He was unable to help Burkina Faso progress past Senegal in the semi-finals, but scored in the 2–1 third-place playoff win over Mali, in which he did not celebrate his goal due to Mali being his country of origin. He dedicated his man-of-the-match award to the people of Burkina Faso.

Camara made his debut for the senior Burkina Faso national team on 6 September 2024 in an Africa Cup of Nations qualifier against Senegal.

== Career statistics ==
=== Club ===
As of 11 October 2023.

Appearances and goals by club, season and competition
Club	Season	League			Cup		Other		Total	
Club	Season	Division	Apps	Goals	Apps	Goals	Apps	Goals	Apps	Goals
Rahimo	2022–23	Burkinabé Premier League	7	0	1 (Note: Appearances in the Coupe du Faso)	0	0	0	8	0
Rahimo	2023–24	Burkinabé Premier League	1	0	0	0	0	0	1	0
Career total			8	0	1	0	0	0	9	0
