= Froilán Díaz =

Argentine footballer (born 2006)

Personal information
- Full name: Froilán Gabriel Díaz
- Date of birth: 1 June 2006 (age 20)
- Place of birth: Reconquista, Santa Fe, Argentina
- Height: 1.89 m (6 ft 2 in)
- Position: Goalkeeper

Team information
- Current team: Unión Santa Fe

Youth career
- Escuela de Fútbol Tobías
- Platense
- 2018–: Unión Santa Fe

International career
Years	Team	Apps	(Gls)
2022	Argentina U16	3	(0)
2022–	Argentina U17	10	(0)

Froilán Gabriel Díaz (born 1 June 2006) is an Argentine footballer currently playing as a goalkeeper for Unión Santa Fe.

== Early and personal life ==
Díaz was born in the city of Reconquista in the Santa Fe Province of Argentina to a father who played as a goalkeeper for the youth teams of Rosario Central. His nephew is also a footballer, and currently plays for Colón.

== Club career ==
Díaz began his footballing career at a small football school in the north of Santa Fe named Escuela de Fútbol Tobías, before spending time in the academy of professional side Platense. At the age of eleven, he trialled with Unión Santa Fe, who offered him a place in their academy, but Díaz initially rejected this offer in order to first complete primary school. The following year, he officially joined the club, and initially started in a number of different positions before settling as a goalkeeper, where he was advised to play due to his height.

In November 2023, he signed his first professional contract with Unión, becoming the youngest player in the club's history to do so, at the age of sixteen.

== International career ==
Díaz represented Argentina's under-16 side at the 2022 edition of the Montaigu Tournament, and was named goalkeeper of the tournament for his performances. The following year he was called up to the under-17 squad for two friendly matches against Paraguay, ahead of the 2023 South American U-17 Championship. Following the conclusion of the South American U-17 Championship, Díaz was called up to train with the full Argentina national football team in May 2023.
