= Kurt Rüger =

German footballer (born 2006)

Personal information
- Date of birth: 15 February 2006 (age 20)
- Height: 1.86 m (6 ft 1 in)
- Positions: Midfielder; right-back

Youth career
- TSV Pliening/Landsham
- 2019–2020: 1860 Munich
- 2020–2025: Bayern Munich

Senior career*
Years	Team	Apps	(Gls)
2024–2026	Bayern Munich II	52	(1)

International career^{‡}
2023	Germany U17	4	(0)
2024	Germany U18	3	(0)
Medal record
Men's football
Representing Germany
FIFA U-17 World Cup
Winner	2023 Indonesia
- * Club domestic league appearances and goals as of 16 May 2025 ‡ National team caps and goals as of 25 March 2024

Kurt Rüger (born 15 February 2006) is a German professional footballer who plays as a midfielder and right-back. He is a former German youth international.

== Club career ==
Rüger is a youth product of 1860 Munich, having moved to the youth academy of Bayern Munich in 2020.

He made his professional debut with Bayern Munich II on 11 May 2024, during the 2023–24 season in a 2–1 away win Regionalliga Bayern match against Greuther Fürth II. Rüger scored his first professional goal on 24 August 2024, during the 2024–25 season in a 4–1 away win Regionalliga Bayern match against Würzburger Kickers.

== International career ==
Rüger has represented Germany at the under-17 (that won the 2023 FIFA U-17 World Cup in Indonesia) and under-18 levels.

== Career statistics ==
As of match played 16 May 2026

Appearances and goals by club, season and competition
Club	Season	League			Cup		Total	
Club	Season	Division	Apps	Goals	Apps	Goals	Apps	Goals
Bayern Munich II	2023–24	Regionalliga Bayern	1	0	—		1	0
Bayern Munich II	2024–25	Regionalliga Bayern	26	1	—		26	1
Bayern Munich II	2025–26	Regionalliga Bayern	25	0	—		25	0
Bayern Munich II	Total		52	1	—		52	1
Career Total			52	1	0	0	52	1

== Honours ==
International

Germany U17

- FIFA U-17 World Cup: 2023
