= Abdoulaye Doumbia =

Ivorian footballer (born 2007)

Personal information
- Date of birth: 27 October 2007 (age 19)
- Place of birth: Abidjan, Ivory Coast
- Height: 1.75 m (5 ft 9 in)
- Position: Midfielder

Team information
- Current team: BK Häcken
- Number: 22

Youth career
- –2025: ASEC Mimosas

Senior career*
Years	Team	Apps	(Gls)
2026–	BK Häcken	26	(2)
- * Club domestic league appearances and goals as of 15 November 2026

Abdoulaye Doumbia (born 27 October 2007) is an Ivorian professional footballer who plays as a midfielder for Allsvenskan club BK Häcken.

== Career ==
=== BK Häcken ===
Doumbia began his career at Ivorian giants ASEC Mimosas in Abidjan. He was scouted by Swedish Allsvenskan sides after playing in the Gothia Cup, and was signed by Allsvenskan side in November 2025, BK Häcken, on a five-year deal. Doumbia scored his first Häcken goal in a 3-0 league victory over Brommapojkarna with a long-range volley. Doumbia also scored in a 4–3 defeat in July against Örgryte IS.

== Career statistics ==
=== Club ===
As of Match played 8 November 2026

Appearances and goals by club, season and competition
Club	Season	League			National cup		Total	
Club	Season	Division	Apps	Goals	Apps	Goals	Apps	Goals
BK Häcken	2026	Allsvenskan	26	2	2	0	28	2
Career total			26	2	2	0	28	2
