= 2023 U-17 Africa Cup of Nations =

14th edition of U-17 AFCON

كأس الأمم الإفريقية تحت 17 سنة 2023

Tournament details
- Host country: Algeria
- Dates: 29 April – 19 May
- Teams: 12 (from 1 confederation)
- Venues: 3 (in 3 host cities)

Final positions
- Champions: Senegal (1st title)
- Runners-up: Morocco
- Third place: Burkina Faso
- Fourth place: Mali

Tournament statistics
- Matches played: 23
- Goals scored: 58 (2.52 per match)
- Top scorer: (Senegal) Amara Diouf (5 goals)
- Best player: (Burkina Faso) Souleymane Alio
- Best goalkeeper: (Senegal) Serigne Diouf
- Fair play award: Morocco

The 2023 U-17 Africa Cup of Nations known as the TotalEnergies U-17 Africa Cup of Nations for sponsorship purposes or 2023 U17 AFCON for short was the 14th edition (19th if editions without hosts are included) of the biennial African youth football tournament organized by Confederation of African Football (CAF) for players aged 17 and below and the first to feature 12 teams in the group stage instead of 8.

Algeria was chosen as hosts of this edition on 15 May 2021 which it organized from 29 April to 19 May. All four semi-finalists qualified for the 2023 FIFA U-17 World Cup in Indonesia as the CAF representatives.

Cameroon were the defending champions but were eliminated in the group stage after losses to Burkina Faso and to Mali. Senegal won their inaugural title, defeating hosts of the cancelled 2021 edition Morocco 2–1 in the final.

== Qualification ==
The CAF decided on 20 July 2017 that the qualification format should be changed and split according to zones.

=== Player eligibility ===
Players born on 1 January 2006 or later were eligible to participate in this edition of the tournament.

=== Qualified teams ===
The following twelve teams qualified for the group stages. However, South Sudan was disqualified from this edition of the tournament after 5 of its players failed the MRI test.

Note: All appearance statistics count only those since the introduction of the group stages in 1995.

| Team | Zone | Date of qualification | Appearance | Last appearance | Previous best performance |
|---|---|---|---|---|---|
| Algeria (hosts) | North Zone | 17 May 2021 | 2nd | 2009 | Runners-up (2009) |
| Morocco | North Zone | 14 November 2022 | 3rd | 2019 | Fourth place (2013) |
| Nigeria | West B Zone | 21 June 2022 | 10th | 2019 | Champions (2001, 2007) |
| Burkina Faso | West B Zone | 21 June 2022 | 7th | 2011 | Champions (2011) |
| Senegal | West A Zone | 7 October 2022 | 3rd | 2019 | Group stage (2011, 2019) |
| Mali | West A Zone | 7 October 2022 | 9th | 2017 | Champions (2015, 2017) |
| Cameroon | Central Zone | 15 January 2023 | 8th | 2019 | Champions (2003, 2019) |
| Congo | Central Zone | 18 January 2023 | 3rd | 2013 | Third place (2011) |
| Somalia | Central-East Zone | 12 October 2022 | 1st | None | Debut |
| ~~South Sudan~~ | Central-East Zone | 12 October 2022 | 1st | None | Debut |
| South Africa | South Zone | 9 December 2022 | 4th | 2015 | Runners-up (2015) |
| Zambia | South Zone | 9 December 2022 | 2nd | 2015 | Group stage (2015) |

== Venues ==
The Algerian Football Federation choose three venues in three cities across the host nation Algeria for hosting this edition of the competition: Algiers, Annaba and Constantine.

| 2023 U-17 Africa Cup of Nations is located in Algeria | Algiers | Annaba |
|---|---|---|
| 2023 U-17 Africa Cup of Nations is located in Algeria | Nelson Mandela Stadium | 19 May 1956 Stadium |
| 2023 U-17 Africa Cup of Nations is located in Algeria | Capacity: 40,784 | Capacity: 58,100 |
| 2023 U-17 Africa Cup of Nations is located in Algeria | Constantine | |
| 2023 U-17 Africa Cup of Nations is located in Algeria | Mohamed Hamlaoui Stadium | |
| 2023 U-17 Africa Cup of Nations is located in Algeria | Capacity: 22,986 | |

== Match officials ==
Referees

- (Gabon) Patrice Mebiame
- (Algeria) Youcef Gamouh
- (Togo) Vincentia Amedome
- (Libya) Muhammad Elmabrouk
- (Mali) Ousmane Diakaté
- (Central African Republic) Merveil Mandekouzou Vendafara
- (South Africa) Akhona Makalima
- (Kenya) Nyagrowa Dickens
- (Senegal) Adalbert Diouf
- (Tanzania) Ahmed Arajiga
- (Ivory Coast) Soro Tuonifere
- (Cameroon) Jeannot Bito
- (South Africa) Jelly Alfred Chavani
- (Madagascar) Ben Amisy Tsimanohitsy
- (Nigeria) Abdulsalam Kasim

Assistant referees

- (Burkina Faso) Adolf Lamien Dofinte
- (Kenya) Sirak Menghis
- (Algeria) Abel Abane
- (Zambia) Diana Chikotesha
- (Uganda) Ronald Katenya
- (Mauritius) Queency Victoire
- (Tunisia) Wael Hannachi
- (Algeria) Asma Feriel Ouahab
- (Kenya) Stephen Yembe
- (Mali) Fanta Kone
- (Ivory Coast) Guylain Ngila
- (Botswana) Lucky Kegakologetswe
- (Cape Verde) Djery Gomes Lopes
- (Cameroon) Carine Atezambong Fomo
- (Algeria) Mohamed Serradj
- (Ivory Coast) Eba Médard Ettien
- (Mauritania) Youssef Mahmoud
- (Senegal) Mamadou Ngom
- (Kenya) Mary Njoroge

Video assistant referees

- (Algeria) Lahlou Benbraham
- (Egypt) Ahmed El Ghandour
- (Mauritius) Ahmad Heeralall

== Draw ==
The group stage draw was conducted on 1 February 2023 at 12:00 WET (UTC±0) at the Cercle National de l'Armée in Algiers, the capital city of hosts Algeria. The 12 teams were drawn into 3 groups of 4 teams. As hosts, Algeria was seeded in Group A and allocated to position A1, while 2019 champions Cameroon was seeded in Group C and allocated to position C1 and 4th-place-finished team also from the 2019 edition Nigeria was seeded in Group B and allocated to position B1; the remaining nine teams were seeded based on their results in the previous valid edition in 2019.

| Seeded | Pot 1 | Pot 2 |
|---|---|---|
| 1. Algeria (hosts) (A1); 2. Nigeria (B1); 3. Cameroon (C1) | 4. Morocco; 5. Senegal; 6. Mali | 7. Congo; 8. Somalia; 9. South Africa; 10. Zambia; 11. Burkina Faso; 12. ~~South Sudan~~ |

== Group stage ==
Tiebreakers

Teams were ranked according to the three points for a win (3 for a win, 1 for a draw and 0 or none for a loss) and if tied on points, the following tie-breaking criteria were applied, in the order given, to determine the rankings (Regulations Article 13):

1. Points in head-to-head matches among tied teams;
2. Goal difference in head-to-head matches among tied teams;
3. Goals scored in head-to-head matches among tied teams;
4. If more than two teams are tied, and after applying all head-to-head criteria above, a subset of teams are still tied, all head-to-head criteria above are reapplied exclusively to this subset of teams;
5. Goal difference in all group matches;
6. Goals scored in all group matches;
7. Drawing of lots.

All times are local, WAT and CET (UTC+1).

=== Group A ===
| Pos | Team | Pld | W | D | L | GF | GA | GD | Pts | Qualification |
|---|---|---|---|---|---|---|---|---|---|---|
| 1 | Senegal | 3 | 3 | 0 | 0 | 7 | 0 | +7 | 9 | Knockout stage |
| 2 | Algeria (H) | 3 | 1 | 1 | 1 | 3 | 4 | −1 | 4 | Knockout stage |
| 3 | Congo | 3 | 0 | 2 | 1 | 2 | 3 | −1 | 2 | Knockout stage |
| 4 | Somalia | 3 | 0 | 1 | 2 | 1 | 6 | −5 | 1 | |

Source: CAF
Rules for classification: Group stage tiebreakers
(H) Hosts
29 April 2023
20:00

| Algeria | 2–0 | Somalia |
|---|---|---|
| Anatouf 22', 52' | Report |

Nelson Mandela Stadium, Algiers
Referee: Patrice Mebiame (Gabon)
30 April 2023
14:00

| Senegal | 1–0 | Congo |
|---|---|---|
| Fallou Diouf 78' | Report |

Nelson Mandela Stadium Algiers
Referee: Akhona Makalima (South Africa)

2 May 2023
17:00

| Algeria | 0–3 | Senegal |
|---|---|---|
| | Report | A. Diouf 45+4', 61' (pen.); Savane 86' |

Nelson Mandela Stadium, Algiers
Referee: Jelly Chavane (South Africa)
2 May 2023
20:00

| Congo | 1–1 | Somalia |
|---|---|---|
| Nzouzi 58' | Report | Diini 32' |

Nelson Mandela Stadium, Algiers
Referee: Vincentia Amédomé (Togo)

5 May 2023
20:00

| Congo | 1–1 | Algeria |
|---|---|---|
| Ndzoukou 67' | Report | Anatouf 74' |

Nelson Mandela Stadium, Algiers
Referee: Abdulsalam Kasim (Nigeria)
5 May 2023
20:00

| Somalia | 0–3 | Senegal |
|---|---|---|
| | Report | Said 8' (o.g.); A. Diouf 33'; Diémé 88' (pen.) |

Mohamed Hamlaoui Stadium, Constantine
Referee: Soro Tuonifere (Ivory Coast)

=== Group B ===
| Pos | Team | Pld | W | D | L | GF | GA | GD | Pts | Qualification |
|---|---|---|---|---|---|---|---|---|---|---|
| 1 | Morocco | 3 | 2 | 0 | 1 | 4 | 2 | +2 | 6 | Knockout stage |
| 2 | Nigeria | 3 | 2 | 0 | 1 | 4 | 3 | +1 | 6 | Knockout stage |
| 3 | South Africa | 3 | 1 | 0 | 2 | 5 | 7 | −2 | 3 | Knockout stage |
| 4 | Zambia | 3 | 1 | 0 | 2 | 4 | 5 | −1 | 3 | |

Source: CAF
Rules for classification: Group stage tiebreakers
30 April 2023
17:00

| Nigeria | 1–0 | Zambia |
|---|---|---|
| Daniel 76' | Report |

Mohamed Hamlaoui Stadium, Constantine
Referee: Youcef Gamouh (Algeria)
30 April 2023
20:00

| Morocco | 2–0 | South Africa |
|---|---|---|
| Ait Boudlal 73' (pen.); Hanin 83' | Report |

Mohamed Hamlaoui Stadium, Constantine
Referee: Adalbert Diouf (Senegal)

3 May 2023
17:00

| Nigeria | 0–1 | Morocco |
|---|---|---|
| | Report | Maâli 2' |

Mohamed Hamlaoui Stadium, Constantine
Referee: Ousmane Diakaté (Mali)
3 May 2023
20:00

| South Africa | 3–2 | Zambia |
|---|---|---|
| Mkhawana 12', 31'; Dokunmu 76' | Report | Mwanza 45', 48' |

Mohamed Hamlaoui Stadium, Constantine
Referee: Muhammad Elmabrouk (Libya)

6 May 2023
20:00

| South Africa | 2–3 | Nigeria |
|---|---|---|
| Mkhawana 6'; Mabena 45+3' | Report | Agada 34'; Eke 46'; Abdullahi 65' |

Mohamed Hamlaoui Stadium, Constantine
Referee: Nyagrowa Dickens (Kenya)
6 May 2023
20:00

| Zambia | 2–1 | Morocco |
|---|---|---|
| Malaya 73'; Mwanza 88' (pen.) | Report | Ouazane 19' |

19 May 1956 Stadium, Annaba
Referee: Merveil Mandekouzou Vendafara (Central Africa Republic)

=== Group C ===
| Pos | Team | Pld | W | D | L | GF | GA | GD | Pts | Qualification |
|---|---|---|---|---|---|---|---|---|---|---|
| 1 | Mali | 2 | 2 | 0 | 0 | 3 | 0 | +3 | 6 | Knockout stage |
| 2 | Burkina Faso | 2 | 1 | 0 | 1 | 2 | 2 | 0 | 3 | Knockout stage |
| 3 | Cameroon | 2 | 0 | 0 | 2 | 1 | 4 | −3 | 0 | |
| 4 | South Sudan | 0 | 0 | 0 | 0 | 0 | 0 | 0 | 0 | Disqualified |

Source: CAF
Rules for classification: Group stage tiebreakers
1 May 2023
17:00

| Cameroon | Cancelled | South Sudan |

19 May 1956 Stadium, Annaba
1 May 2023
20:00

| Mali | 1–0 | Burkina Faso |
|---|---|---|
| M. Doumbia 26' | Report |

19 May 1956 Stadium, Annaba
Referee: Abdulsalam Kasim (Nigeria)

4 May 2023
17:00

| Cameroon | 0–2 | Mali |
|---|---|---|
| | Report | Barry 86'; M. Doumbia 90+5' |

19 May 1956 Stadium, Annaba
Referee: Bouchra Karboubi (Morocco)
4 May 2023
20:00

| Burkina Faso | Cancelled | South Sudan |

19 May 1956 Stadium, Annaba

7 May 2023
20:00

| Burkina Faso | 2–1 | Cameroon |
|---|---|---|
| S. Alio 76', 79' | Report | Yondjio 62' |

19 May 1956 Stadium, Annaba
Referee: Mustapha Kech Chaf (Morocco)
7 May 2023
20:00

| South Sudan | Cancelled | Mali |

Mohamed Hamlaoui Stadium, Constantine

=== Ranking of third-placed teams ===
With South Sudan's disqualification, rankings against the fourth-placed team of group A and B were not counted.

| Pos | Grp | Team | Pld | W | D | L | GF | GA | GD | Pts | Qualification |
|---|---|---|---|---|---|---|---|---|---|---|---|
| 1 | A | Congo | 2 | 0 | 1 | 1 | 1 | 2 | −1 | 1 | Knockout stage |
| 2 | B | South Africa | 2 | 0 | 0 | 2 | 2 | 5 | −3 | 0 | Knockout stage |
| 3 | C | Cameroon | 2 | 0 | 0 | 2 | 1 | 4 | −3 | 0 | |

Source: CAF

== Knockout stage ==
=== Bracket ===
Quarter-finals
10 May – Algiers
Senegal | 5
South Africa | 0
11 May – Algiers
Nigeria | 1
Burkina Faso | 2
10 May – Constantine
Morocco | 3
Algeria | 0
11 May – Annaba
Mali | 3
Congo | 0

Semi-finals
14 May – Annaba
Senegal (p) | 1 (5)
Burkina Faso | 1 (4)
14 May – Constantine
Morocco (p) | 0 (6)
Mali | 0 (5)

Final
19 May –Algiers
Senegal | 2
Morocco | 1
Third place
18 May – Annaba
Burkina Faso | 2
Mali | 1

=== Quarter finals ===
Winners qualified for the 2023 FIFA U-17 World Cup in Indonesia.

10 May 2023
17:00

| Senegal | 5–0 | South Africa |
|---|---|---|
| Renecke 36' (o.g.); Wallis 39' (o.g.); Sadio 44'; A. Diouf 54', 72' | Report |

Nelson Mandela Stadium, Algiers
Referee: Patrice Mebiame (Gabon)

10 May 2023
20:00

| Morocco | 3–0 | Algeria |
|---|---|---|
| Ouazane 28', 57'; Chakir 87' | Report |

Mohamed Hamlaoui Stadium, Constantine
Referee: Muhammad Elmabrouk (Libya)

11 May 2023
17:00

| Mali | 3–0 | Congo |
|---|---|---|
| Tia 7'; M. Doumbia 31'; Barry 56' (pen.) | Report |

19 May 1956 Stadium, Annaba
Referee: Adalbert Diouf (Senegal)

11 May 2023
20:00

| Nigeria | 1–2 | Burkina Faso |
|---|---|---|
| Abdullahi 67' | Report | A. Camara 45', 57' (pen.) |

Nelson Mandela Stadium, Algiers
Referee: Youcef Gamouh (Algeria)

=== Semi-finals ===
14 May 2023
17:00

| Senegal | 1–1 | Burkina Faso |
|---|---|---|
| A. Fall 16' | Report | Ouédraogo 83' |
Penalties
| Fallou Diouf (penalty scored); Dorival (penalty scored); Sow (penalty scored); Savane (penalty scored); A. Diouf (penalty scored) | 5–4 | (penalty scored) Ouédraogo; (penalty scored) Ouattara; (penalty scored) Soré; (penalty scored) Yaméogo; (penalty missed) S. Alio |

19 May 1956 Stadium, Annaba
Referee: Muhammad Elmabrouk (Libya)

14 May 2023
20:00

| Morocco | 0–0 | Mali |
|---|---|---|
| | Report |
Penalties
| Radouane (penalty scored); Maâli (penalty missed); Bakhty (penalty missed); Hamony (penalty scored); Aït Boudlal (penalty scored); Katiba (penalty scored); El Motaouakkel (penalty scored); Zahouani (penalty scored) | 6–5 | (penalty scored) Tia; (penalty scored) Simpara; (penalty scored) S. Koné; (penalty missed) Kanaté; (penalty missed) I. Diarra; (penalty scored) M. Doumbia; (penalty scored) Sanogo; (penalty missed) G. Koné |

Mohamed Hamlaoui Stadium, Constantine
Referee: Abdulsalam Kasim (Nigeria)

=== Third-place match ===
18 May 2023
20:00

| Burkina Faso | 2–1 | Mali |
|---|---|---|
| O. Camara 26' (pen.); Bougma 47' | Report | M. Doumbia 58' |

19 May 1956 Stadium, Annaba
Referee: Youcef Gamouh (Algeria)

=== Final ===
19 May 2023
22:00

| Senegal | 2–1 | Morocco |
|---|---|---|
| Fallou Diouf 80' (pen.); Savane 83' | Report | Aït Boudlal 14' |

Nelson Mandela Stadium, Algiers
Referee: Patrice Mebiame (Gabon)

== Winners ==
2023 U-17 Africa Cup of Nations

Senegal
First title

== Awards ==
The following awards were given at the conclusion of the tournament:

| Golden Boot | Most Valuable Player | Best Goalkeeper | Coach of the Tournament | Fair Play award |
|---|---|---|---|---|
| (Senegal) Amara Diouf | (Burkina Faso) Souleymane Alio | (Senegal) Serigne Diouf | (Morocco) Said Chiba | Morocco |

- Best XI:

| Goalkeeper | Defenders | Midfielders | Forwards |
|---|---|---|---|
| (Senegal) Serigne Diouf | (Burkina Faso) Lassina Traoré (Morocco) Abdelhamid Ait Boudlal (Senegal) Serigne Fallou Diouf (Nigeria) Yahaya Lawali | (Mali) Sékou Koné (Senegal) Abdou Aziz Fall (Burkina Faso) Rachid Ouedraogo | (Senegal) Amara Diouf (Burkina Faso) Souleymane Alio (Mali) Mamadou Doumbia |

== Goalscorers ==
There were 58 goals scored in 23 matches, for an average of 2.52 goals per match.

5 goals

- (Senegal) Amara Diouf

4 goals

- (Mali) Mamadou Doumbia

3 goals

- (Algeria) Moslem Anatouf
- (Morocco) Zakaria Ouazane
- (South Africa) Vicky Mkhawana
- (Zambia) Emmanuel Mwanza

2 goals

- (Burkina Faso) Souleymane Alio
- (Burkina Faso) Aboubacar Camara
- (Mali) Mahamoud Barry
- (Morocco) Abdelhamid Ait Boudlal
- (Nigeria) Abubakar Abdullahi
- (Senegal) Serigne Fallou Diouf
- (Senegal) Mamadou Savane

1 goal

- (Burkina Faso) Appolinaire Bougma
- (Burkina Faso) Ousmane Camara
- (Burkina Faso) Rachide Ouédraogo
- (Cameroon) Matah Yondjio
- (Republic of the Congo) Joseph Ndzoukou
- (Republic of the Congo) Wumba Nzouzi
- (Mali) Ange Martial Tia
- (Morocco) Adam Chakir
- (Morocco) Adam Hanin
- (Morocco) Abdelhamid Maâli
- (Nigeria) Charles Agada
- (Nigeria) Favour Daniel
- (Nigeria) Light Eke
- (Senegal) Yaya Diémé
- (Senegal) Abdou Aziz Fall
- (Senegal) Mamadou Sadio
- (Somalia) Diini Mohamed
- (South Africa) Michael Dokunmu
- (South Africa) Siyabonga Mabena
- (Zambia) Samson Malaya

1 own goal

- (Somalia) Said Mohamed (against Senegal)
- (South Africa) Waylon Renecke (against Senegal)
- (South Africa) Benjamin Wallis (against Senegal)

== Qualified teams for the 2023 FIFA U-17 World Cup ==
The following teams from CAF qualified for the 2023 FIFA U-17 World Cup in Indonesia.

| Team | Qualified on | Previous appearances in FIFA U-17 World Cup^{1} |
|---|---|---|
| Senegal | 10 May 2023 | 1 (2019) |
| Morocco | 10 May 2023 | 1 (2013) |
| Mali | 11 May 2023 | 5 (1997, 1999, 2001, 2015, 2017) |
| Burkina Faso | 11 May 2023 | 4 (1999, 2001, 2009, 2011) |

^{1} Bold indicates champions for that year. Italic indicates hosts for that year.

== See also ==
- 2023 U-20 Africa Cup of Nations
