= Paulo Iago =

Spanish footballer

Personal information
- Full name: Paulo Iago Álvarez Morón
- Date of birth: 10 April 2007 (age 19)
- Place of birth: Madrid, Spain
- Position: Midfielder

Team information
- Current team: Sporting CP

Youth career
- 2011–2013: Parque Sureste
- 2013–2014: Adpi Rivas
- 2013–2014: Estrella de Madrid
- 2014–2024: Real Madrid
- 2024–: Sporting CP

International career^{‡}
Years	Team	Apps	(Gls)
2022	Spain U15	6	(4)
2022–2023	Spain U16	8	(1)
2023–	Spain U17	12	(2)
- ‡ National team caps and goals as of 04:15, 31 May 2024 (UTC)

Paulo Iago Álvarez Morón (born 10 April 2007), known as Paulo Iago or just Paulo, is a Spanish professional footballer currently playing as a midfielder for Sporting CP.

== Club career ==
Born in Madrid, Paulo Iago developed an interest for football at the age of two, and was encouraged by his father, Xosé "Pepe" Álvarez Murias, a former amateur footballer from A Fonsagrada, Lugo.

He joined Parque Sureste at the age of four, but broke his tibia and fibula in a skateboarding accident shortly after his first training session. After a year out, he returned to become top scorer in his category at the age of five. He was scouted by professional sides Atlético Madrid, Rayo Vallecano and Real Madrid, a rare feat for a player of such a young age. Short spells with Adpi Rivas and Estrella de Madrid followed, before he joined Real Madrid in 2014.

He progressed well through La Fábrica, scoring over 150 goals in his first five years with the club. After signing with super-agent Jorge Mendes, he signed his first contract with Los Blancos in 2022.

In the 2024/25 season summer market, Paulo Iago left Real Madrid academy and joined Sporting Clube de Portugal

== International career ==
Paulo Iago has represented Spain at under-15 level. He was called up to the under-16 team in August 2022.

== Style of play ==
A goal-scorer from midfield, he has drawn comparisons to Ballon d'Or winners Lionel Messi and Luka Modrić.
