= Souleymane Alio =

Burkinabe footballer (born 2006)

Personal information
- Date of birth: 28 October 2006 (age 20)
- Place of birth: Ivory Coast
- Height: 1.88 m (6 ft 2 in)
- Position: Forward

Team information
- Current team: Nordsjælland
- Number: 33

Youth career
- -2024: New Stars
- 2025–: Nordsjælland

Senior career*
Years	Team	Apps	(Gls)
2025–	Nordsjælland	2	(0)

International career^{‡}
2023–	Burkina Faso U17	9	(3)
- * Club domestic league appearances and goals as of 7 October 2025 ‡ National team caps and goals as of 29 May 2025

Souleymane Alio (born 28 October 2006) is a footballer who plays for Danish Superliga club Nordsjælland as an attacker. Born in the Ivory Coast, to a Burkinabé father, and Malian mother, he is a youth international for Burkina Faso.

== Biography ==
Alio was born in Ivory Coast to a Burkinabé father and a Malian mother. He started his football career in Ivory Coast before moving to Burkina Faso. By 2023, Alio was on the books of New Stars FC who play in the third division in Burkina Faso.

In November 2023, he was announced as one of those nominated in the Best Young Player category at the CAF Awards.

=== FC Nordsjælland ===
On 21 November 2023, Danish Superliga club FC Nordsjælland announced the signing of Alio, starting from end 2024, where turns 18.

== International career ==
Representing the Burkina Faso national under-17 football team he was voted the most valuable player at the 2023 U-17 Africa Cup of Nations. During the tournament held in Algeria in May 2923, he had helped his country finish third overall. He shone in matches against Cameroon U17 and Nigeria U17, being named man-of-the-match in both matches, before his Burkina Faso side bowed out at the semi-finals against Senegal U17. He then played as Burkino Faso U17 triumphed in the third place play-off.

== Style of play ==
Burkina Faso U17 coach Brahima Traore described Alio as an unselfish striker, noting that Alio had been developed as wide player, but that he moved him to play centre-forward upon seeing his profile.

== Career statistics ==
As of match played 22 September 2025

Appearances and goals by club, season and competition
Club	Season	League			National cup		Europe		Other		Total	
Club	Season	Division	Apps	Goals	Apps	Goals	Apps	Goals	Apps	Goals	Apps	Goals
Nordsjælland	2025–26	Danish Superliga	2	0	0	0	—		—		2	0
Career total			2	0	0	0	0	0	0	0	2	0
