= 2023 UEFA European Under-17 Championship squads =

This article describes about the squads for the 2023 UEFA European Under-17 Championship.

Players in boldface have been capped at full international level at some point in their career.

== Group A ==
=== Hungary ===
Head coach: Attila Belvon

No.	Pos.	Player	Date of birth (age)	Club
1	GK	Áron Yaakobishvili	6 March 2006 (aged 17)	(Royal Spanish Football Federation) Barcelona
12	GK	Bendegúz Lehoczki	28 December 2006 (aged 16)	(Hungarian Football Federation) Puskás Akadémia
2	DF	Attila Girsik	1 February 2006 (aged 17)	(Hungarian Football Federation) Vasas
3	DF	Csaba Hornyák	22 June 2006 (aged 16)	(Hungarian Football Federation) Debrecen
4	DF	Ádám Umathum	8 April 2006 (aged 17)	(Hungarian Football Federation) Puskás Akadémia
5	DF	Levente Kubicsek	9 February 2006 (aged 17)	(Hungarian Football Federation) Puskás Akadémia
13	DF	Márton Demkó	13 March 2006 (aged 17)	(United States Soccer Federation) El Paso
15	DF	Dominik Kaczvinszki	1 March 2006 (aged 17)	(Hungarian Football Federation) Honvéd
19	DF	Noel Lengyel	13 November 2006 (aged 16)	(Hungarian Football Federation) Főnix
23	DF	Manuel Burghart	6 July 2006 (aged 16)	(Austrian Football Association) Ried
6	MF	Noah Fenyő	30 January 2006 (aged 17)	(German Football Association) Eintracht Frankfurt
8	MF	Martin Kern	23 March 2006 (aged 17)	(Hungarian Football Federation) Puskás Akadémia
14	MF	Bence Somfalvi	13 May 2006 (aged 17)	(Hungarian Football Federation) Puskás Akadémia
18	MF	Hunor Németh	16 March 2007 (aged 16)	(Danish Football Association) Copenhagen
20	MF	Mátyás Vidnyánszky	25 January 2006 (aged 17)	(Slovak Football Association) FC DAC
7	FW	Zétény Varga	19 July 2006 (aged 16)	(Hungarian Football Federation) Ferencváros
9	FW	Benedek Simon	15 May 2006 (aged 17)	(Hungarian Football Federation) Honvéd
10	FW	Ádám Bagi	15 September 2006 (aged 16)	(Hungarian Football Federation) Ferencváros
11	FW	Csaba Molnár	24 June 2006 (aged 16)	(Hungarian Football Federation) Vasas
17	FW	Szilárd Szabó	1 October 2006 (aged 16)	(Hungarian Football Federation) Ferencváros

=== Republic of Ireland ===
Head coach: Colin O'Brien

No.	Pos.	Player	Date of birth (age)	Club
1	GK	Jason Healy	6 March 2006 (aged 17)	(Football Association of Ireland) Waterford
16	GK	Joe Collins	25 February 2007 (aged 16)	(Football Association of Ireland) Bohemians
2	DF	Daniel Babb	15 January 2006 (aged 17)	(Football Association of Ireland) UCD
3	DF	Cory O'Sullivan	2 May 2006 (aged 17)	(Football Association of Ireland) Shamrock Rovers
5	DF	Jake Grante	2 January 2006 (aged 17)	(The Football Association) Crystal Palace
13	DF	Kaylem Harnett	22 May 2007 (aged 15)	(Football Association of Ireland) Wexford
17	DF	Ade Solanke	9 January 2008 (aged 15)	(Football Association of Ireland) Shamrock Rovers
18	DF	Stan Ashbee	28 November 2006 (aged 16)	(The Football Association) Hull City
4	MF	Freddie Turley	3 July 2006 (aged 16)	(Football Association of Ireland) Shamrock Rovers
6	MF	Danny McGrath	28 January 2006 (aged 17)	(Football Association of Ireland) Bohemians
7	MF	Luke Kehir	2 February 2006 (aged 17)	(Football Association of Ireland) St Patrick's Athletic
8	MF	Romeo Akachukwu	28 July 2006 (aged 16)	(Football Association of Ireland) Waterford
12	MF	Rhys Bartley	3 March 2006 (aged 17)	(Football Association of Ireland) St Patrick's Athletic
14	MF	Matthew Moore	27 March 2007 (aged 16)	(Football Association of Ireland) Cork City
15	MF	Taylor Mooney	16 April 2006 (aged 17)	(Football Association of Ireland) St Patrick's Athletic
9	FW	Nickson Okosun	21 November 2006 (aged 16)	(Football Association of Ireland) Bohemians
10	FW	Naj Razi	28 October 2006 (aged 16)	(Football Association of Ireland) Shamrock Rovers
11	FW	Ike Orazi	11 June 2007 (aged 15)	(Football Association of Ireland) Shamrock Rovers
19	FW	**Mason Melia**	22 September 2007 (aged 15)	(Football Association of Ireland) St Patrick's Athletic
20	FW	Matthew Murray	1 October 2007 (aged 15)	(Football Association of Ireland) Cork City

=== Poland ===
Head Coach: Marcin Włodarski

No.	Pos.	Player	Date of birth (age)	Club
1	GK	Axel Holewiński	22 February 2006 (aged 17)	(Polish Football Association) Pogoń Szczecin
12	GK	Jakub Stępak	20 March 2006 (aged 17)	(Polish Football Association) Wisła Kraków
22	GK	Miłosz Piekutowski	8 May 2006 (aged 17)	(Polish Football Association) Jagiellonia Białystok
2	DF	Dominik Szala	24 April 2006 (aged 17)	(Polish Football Association) Górnik Zabrze
3	DF	Jakub Krzyżanowski	19 January 2006 (aged 17)	(Polish Football Association) Wisła Kraków
4	DF	Igor Orlikowski	9 February 2006 (aged 17)	(Polish Football Association) Zagłębie Lubin
5	DF	Michał Gurgul	30 January 2006 (aged 17)	(Polish Football Association) Lech Poznań
15	DF	Nico Adamczyk	25 January 2006 (aged 17)	(German Football Association) Borussia Dortmund
23	DF	Piotr Kowalik	19 June 2006 (aged 16)	(Polish Football Association) Sandecja Nowy Sącz
6	MF	Maksymilian Sznaucer	30 March 2006 (aged 17)	(Hellenic Football Federation) PAOK
7	MF	Filip Wolski	9 April 2006 (aged 17)	(Polish Football Association) Lech Poznań
8	MF	Karol Borys	28 September 2006 (aged 16)	(Polish Football Association) Śląsk Wrocław
11	MF	Krzysztof Kolanko	3 August 2006 (aged 16)	(Polish Football Association) Górnik Zabrze
14	MF	Mateusz Skoczylas	20 September 2006 (aged 16)	(Polish Football Association) Zagłębie Lubin
16	MF	Krzysztof Kurowski	19 June 2006 (aged 16)	(Polish Football Association) Śląsk Wrocław II
19	MF	Igor Brzyski	15 March 2007 (aged 16)	(Polish Football Association) Lech Poznań
20	MF	Filip Rejczyk	20 April 2006 (aged 17)	(Polish Football Association) Legia Warsaw
21	MF	Szymon Kądziołka	29 January 2006 (aged 17)	(Polish Football Association) Stal Rzeszów
9	FW	Oskar Tomczyk	25 January 2006 (aged 17)	(Polish Football Association) Lech Poznań
10	FW	Daniel Mikołajewski	24 January 2006 (aged 17)	(Italian Football Federation) Parma
17	FW	Mike Huras	28 January 2006 (aged 17)	(German Football Association) VfB Stuttgart

=== Wales ===
Head coach: Craig Knight

No.	Pos.	Player	Date of birth (age)	Club
1	GK	Kit Margetson	10 July 2006 (aged 16)	(Football Association of Wales) Swansea City
12	GK	Luke Armstrong	19 June 2006 (aged 16)	(Football Association of Wales) Cardiff City
2	DF	Rhys Thomas	5 January 2006 (aged 17)	(The Football Association) Manchester City
3	DF	Luey Giles	4 August 2006 (aged 16)	(Football Association of Wales) Cardiff City
5	DF	Dylan Lawlor	1 January 2006 (aged 17)	(Football Association of Wales) Cardiff City
6	DF	Brayden Clarke	3 July 2007 (aged 15)	(The Football Association) Wolverhampton Wanderers
15	DF	Alyas Debono	3 September 2006 (aged 16)	(Football Association of Wales) Cardiff City
4	MF	Joe Andrews	14 February 2006 (aged 17)	(The Football Association) Southampton
7	MF	Cody Twose	27 June 2006 (aged 16)	(Football Association of Wales) Cardiff City
8	MF	Charlie Crew	15 June 2006 (aged 16)	(The Football Association) Leeds United
13	MF	Sam Parker	7 July 2006 (aged 16)	(Football Association of Wales) Swansea City
14	MF	Josh Beecher	16 March 2006 (aged 17)	(Football Association of Wales) Cardiff City
16	MF	Jacob Cook	31 October 2006 (aged 16)	(Football Association of Wales) Swansea City
18	MF	Alfie Tuck	9 May 2006 (aged 17)	(The Football Association) Queens Park Rangers
9	FW	Iwan Morgan	29 January 2006 (aged 17)	(Football Association of Wales) Swansea City
10	FW	Gabriele Biancheri	18 September 2006 (aged 16)	(The Football Association) Manchester United
11	FW	Joe Hatch	7 September 2006 (aged 16)	(The Football Association) Plymouth Argyle
17	FW	Alfie Cunningham	13 February 2006 (aged 17)	(The Football Association) Exeter City
19	FW	Freddie Issaka	28 July 2006 (aged 16)	(The Football Association) Plymouth Argyle
20	FW	Troy Perrett	28 October 2006 (aged 16)	(Football Association of Wales) Cardiff City

== Group B ==
=== Serbia ===
Head coach: Aleksandar Lukoviċ

No.	Pos.	Player	Date of birth (age)	Club
1	GK	Vanja Radulaški	4 April 2006 (aged 17)	(Football Association of Serbia) Partizan
23	GK	Viktor Džodić	15 November 2006 (aged 16)	(French Football Federation) Montpellier
3	DF	David Đurić	19 March 2006 (aged 17)	(Football Association of Serbia) Crvena Zvezda
4	DF	Veljko Milosavljević	28 June 2007 (aged 15)	(Football Association of Serbia) Crvena Zvezda
5	DF	Nikola Simić	30 March 2007 (aged 16)	(Football Association of Serbia) Partizan
6	DF	Andrej Popović	25 April 2006 (aged 17)	(Football Association of Serbia) Partizan
15	DF	Viktor Stojanović	2 October 2007 (aged 15)	(Football Association of Serbia) Crvena Zvezda
2	MF	Uroš Ćuk	31 March 2006 (aged 17)	(Football Association of Serbia) Partizan
8	MF	Andrej Petrović	24 April 2006 (aged 17)	(Football Association of Serbia) Crvena Zvezda
10	MF	Andrija Maksimović	5 June 2007 (aged 15)	(Football Association of Serbia) Crvena Zvezda
13	MF	Adem Avdić	24 September 2007 (aged 15)	(Football Association of Serbia) Crvena Zvezda
14	MF	Stefan Mitrović	28 April 2006 (aged 17)	(Football Association of Serbia) Čukarički
18	MF	Zoran Alilović	14 March 2006 (aged 17)	(Football Association of Serbia) Partizan
21	MF	Veljko Vukojeviċ	22 August 2006 (aged 16)	(Football Association of Serbia) Crvena Zvezda
7	FW	Mihajlo Cvetković	10 January 2007 (aged 16)	(Football Association of Serbia) Čukarički
9	FW	Nikša Delibašić	8 February 2006 (aged 17)	(Football Association of Serbia) Čukarički
11	FW	Matija Popović	8 January 2006 (aged 17)	(Football Association of Serbia) Partizan
19	FW	Uroš Sremčević	24 April 2006 (aged 17)	(Football Association of Serbia) Mladost Lučani
20	FW	Andrej Subotić	30 August 2006 (aged 16)	(Football Association of Serbia) Čukarički
22	FW	Veljko Jocić	5 July 2006 (aged 16)	(Football Association of Serbia) Jagodina

=== Spain ===
Head coach: Julen Guerrero

No.	Pos.	Player	Date of birth (age)	Club
1	GK	Raúl Jiménez	16 February 2006 (aged 17)	(Royal Spanish Football Federation) Valencia
13	GK	Francisco Árbol	30 June 2006 (aged 16)	(Royal Spanish Football Federation) Granada
2	DF	Héctor Fort	2 August 2006 (aged 16)	(Royal Spanish Football Federation) Barcelona
3	DF	Dani Muñoz	19 July 2006 (aged 16)	(Royal Spanish Football Federation) Atlético Madrid
4	DF	**Jon Martín**	23 April 2006 (aged 17)	(Royal Spanish Football Federation) Real Sociedad
5	DF	**Pau Cubarsí**	22 January 2007 (aged 16)	(Royal Spanish Football Federation) Barcelona
12	DF	David Arza	18 February 2006 (aged 17)	(Royal Spanish Football Federation) Atlético Madrid
14	DF	Izan Merino	15 April 2006 (aged 17)	(Royal Spanish Football Federation) Málaga
17	DF	Óscar Mesa	3 July 2006 (aged 16)	(Royal Spanish Football Federation) Real Madrid
6	MF	Pau Prim	22 February 2006 (aged 17)	(Royal Spanish Football Federation) Barcelona
7	MF	Roberto Martín	12 August 2006 (aged 16)	(Royal Spanish Football Federation) Real Madrid
8	MF	Javier Fernández	28 November 2006 (aged 16)	(German Football Association) Bayern Munich
15	MF	Javier Díaz	21 January 2006 (aged 17)	(Royal Spanish Football Federation) Atlético Madrid
16	MF	Hugo Martínez	23 August 2006 (aged 16)	(Royal Spanish Football Federation) Albacete
18	MF	Alejandro Granados	30 May 2006 (aged 16)	(United States Soccer Federation) Orlando City
9	FW	Marc Guiu	4 January 2006 (aged 17)	(Royal Spanish Football Federation) Barcelona
10	FW	**Lamine Yamal**	13 July 2007 (aged 15)	(Royal Spanish Football Federation) Barcelona
11	FW	Jorge Rajado	16 May 2006 (aged 17)	(Royal Spanish Football Federation) Atlético Madrid
19	FW	Lluc Castell	19 September 2006 (aged 16)	(Royal Spanish Football Federation) Espanyol
20	FW	Juan Hernández	21 July 2007 (aged 15)	(Royal Spanish Football Federation) Barcelona

=== Italy ===
Head coach: Bernardo Corradi

Note: on 20 May 2023, Francesco Plaia withdrew from the squad due to an injury, being subsequently replaced by Diego Mascardi.

No.	Pos.	Player	Date of birth (age)	Club
1	GK	Tommaso Martinelli	6 January 2006 (aged 17)	(Italian Football Federation) Fiorentina
12	GK	Diego Mascardi	26 September 2006 (aged 16)	(Italian Football Federation) Spezia
2	DF	Vittorio Magni	1 June 2006 (aged 16)	(Italian Football Federation) AC Milan
3	DF	Matteo Cocchi	1 February 2007 (aged 16)	(Italian Football Federation) Inter Milan
5	DF	Edoardo Sadotti	27 February 2006 (aged 17)	(Italian Football Federation) Fiorentina
6	DF	Gabriel Ramaj	9 February 2006 (aged 17)	(Italian Football Federation) Atalanta
13	DF	Filippo Pagnucco	9 February 2006 (aged 17)	(Italian Football Federation) Juventus
15	DF	Alessandro Bassino	12 February 2006 (aged 17)	(Italian Football Federation) Juventus
16	DF	Giorgio Vezzosi	14 January 2007 (aged 16)	(Italian Football Federation) Sassuolo
4	MF	Lorenzo Riccio	25 July 2006 (aged 16)	(Italian Football Federation) Atalanta
7	MF	Leonardo Mendicino	1 January 2006 (aged 17)	(Italian Football Federation) Atalanta
8	MF	Mattia Mannini (c)	8 July 2006 (aged 16)	(Italian Football Federation) Roma
10	MF	Marco Romano	1 March 2006 (aged 17)	(Italian Football Federation) Genoa
14	MF	Giacomo De Pieri	29 December 2006 (aged 16)	(Italian Football Federation) Inter Milan
17	MF	Francesco Crapisto	15 January 2006 (aged 17)	(Italian Football Federation) Juventus
20	MF	Mattia Liberali	6 April 2007 (aged 16)	(Italian Football Federation) AC Milan
9	FW	Federico Ragnoli Galli	24 January 2006 (aged 17)	(Italian Football Federation) Atalanta
11	FW	Tommaso Ravaglioli	20 February 2006 (aged 17)	(Italian Football Federation) Bologna
18	FW	Emanuele Rao	28 March 2006 (aged 17)	(Italian Football Federation) SPAL
19	FW	**Seydou Fini**	2 June 2006 (aged 16)	(Italian Football Federation) Genoa

=== Slovenia ===
Head coach: Mišo Brečko

No.	Pos.	Player	Date of birth (age)	Club
1	GK	Žan Trivunčević	18 December 2006 (aged 16)	(Football Association of Slovenia) Bravo
12	GK	Nik Čebulj	9 January 2006 (aged 17)	(Football Association of Slovenia) Olimpija Ljubljana
2	DF	Haris Kahvedžić	8 July 2006 (aged 16)	(Football Association of Slovenia) Celje
3	DF	Mark Tomšič	28 January 2006 (aged 17)	(Football Association of Slovenia) Brinje Grosuplje
4	DF	Lev Bohinc	8 June 2006 (aged 16)	(Football Association of Slovenia) Olimpija Ljubljana
5	DF	Relja Obrić	11 April 2006 (aged 17)	(Italian Football Federation) Atalanta
6	DF	Lovro Golič	5 March 2006 (aged 17)	(Italian Football Federation) Roma
15	DF	Gabriel Sojer	24 May 2006 (aged 16)	(Football Association of Slovenia) Ilirija 1911
17	DF	Mark Kerin	6 June 2007 (aged 15)	(Croatian Football Federation) Dinamo Zagreb
19	DF	Kristjan Bendra	30 January 2006 (aged 17)	(Austrian Football Association) Red Bull Salzburg
7	MF	David Pejičić	14 June 2007 (aged 15)	(Italian Football Federation) Udinese
8	MF	Jaša Jelen	15 April 2006 (aged 17)	(Football Association of Slovenia) Olimpija Ljubljana
10	MF	Luka Topalović	23 February 2006 (aged 17)	(Football Association of Slovenia) Domžale
13	MF	Lanej Bakšič	27 May 2006 (aged 16)	(Football Association of Slovenia) Maribor
16	MF	Nik Voglar	6 May 2006 (aged 17)	(Football Association of Slovenia) Maribor
21	MF	Matjaž Veber	16 August 2006 (aged 16)	(Football Association of Slovenia) Ilirija 1911
23	MF	Rene Hrvatin	8 December 2006 (aged 16)	(Football Association of Slovenia) Koper
9	FW	Aldin Jakupović	4 June 2006 (aged 16)	(Football Association of Slovenia) Olimpija Ljubljana
11	FW	Nino Kutoš	28 June 2006 (aged 16)	(German Football Association) VfB Stuttgart
18	FW	Luka Mlakar	27 April 2006 (aged 17)	(Italian Football Federation) Roma

== Group C ==
=== Portugal ===
Head coach: Filipe Ramos

No.	Pos.	Player	Date of birth (age)	Club
1	GK	Gonçalo Ribeiro	15 January 2006 (aged 17)	(Portuguese Football Federation) Porto
12	GK	André Moreira	9 July 2006 (aged 16)	(Portuguese Football Federation) Benfica
2	DF	Martim Fernandes	18 January 2006 (aged 17)	(Portuguese Football Federation) Porto
3	DF	João Fonseca	31 August 2006 (aged 16)	(Portuguese Football Federation) Benfica
4	DF	Guilherme Gaspar	13 May 2006 (aged 17)	(Portuguese Football Federation) Benfica
5	DF	Tiago Parente	12 June 2006 (aged 16)	(Portuguese Football Federation) Benfica
13	DF	Rayhan Momade	5 January 2006 (aged 17)	(Portuguese Football Federation) Sporting
14	DF	Gonçalo Oliveira	4 July 2006 (aged 16)	(Portuguese Football Federation) Benfica
6	MF	Martim Ferreira	26 January 2006 (aged 17)	(Portuguese Football Federation) Benfica
7	MF	Gil Martins	12 May 2006 (aged 17)	(Portuguese Football Federation) Porto
8	MF	João Texeira	9 April 2006 (aged 17)	(Portuguese Football Federation) Porto
10	MF	Rodrigo Duarte	7 February 2006 (aged 17)	(Portuguese Football Federation) Vitória Guimarães
15	MF	João Simões	6 January 2007 (aged 16)	(Portuguese Football Federation) Sporting
16	MF	Diogo Sousa	20 January 2006 (aged 17)	(Portuguese Football Federation) Vitória Guimarães
9	FW	Nuno Patrício	7 January 2006 (aged 17)	(Portuguese Football Federation) Braga
11	FW	Olivio Tomé	27 January 2006 (aged 17)	(Portuguese Football Federation) Benfica
17	FW	Gonçalo Moreira	3 January 2006 (aged 17)	(Portuguese Football Federation) Benfica
18	FW	Geovany Quenda	30 April 2007 (aged 16)	(Portuguese Football Federation) Sporting
19	FW	Gonçalo Sousa	30 June 2006 (aged 16)	(Portuguese Football Federation) Porto
20	FW	João Infante	29 January 2006 (aged 17)	(Portuguese Football Federation) Sporting

=== France ===
Head coach: Jean-Luc Vannuchi

Eli Junior Kroupi was initially selected, but was forced to withdraw due to injury.

No.	Pos.	Player	Date of birth (age)	Club
1	GK	Paul Argney	23 May 2006 (aged 16)	(French Football Federation) Le Havre
16	GK	Mathys Niflore	2 March 2007 (aged 16)	(French Football Federation) Toulouse
2	DF	Aymen Sadi	10 April 2006 (aged 17)	(French Football Federation) Valenciennes
3	DF	Nhoa Sangui	27 February 2006 (aged 17)	(French Football Federation) Reims
4	DF	Joachim Kayi Sanda	29 November 2006 (aged 16)	(French Football Federation) Valenciennes
5	DF	Bastien Meupiyou	19 March 2006 (aged 17)	(French Football Federation) Nantes
12	DF	Yvann Titi	5 May 2006 (aged 17)	(French Football Federation) Troyes
13	DF	Dan Sinate	9 June 2006 (aged 16)	(French Football Federation) Monaco
14	DF	Joane Kouakou Gadou	17 January 2007 (aged 16)	(French Football Federation) Paris Saint-Germain
6	MF	Nolan Ferro	18 January 2006 (aged 17)	(French Football Federation) Strasbourg
8	MF	Saïmon Bouabré	1 June 2006 (aged 16)	(French Football Federation) Monaco
10	MF	Ismail Bouneb	7 June 2006 (aged 16)	(French Football Federation) Valenciennes
15	MF	Daouda Traoré	22 July 2006 (aged 16)	(French Football Federation) Nice
18	MF	Fodé Sylla	16 April 2006 (aged 17)	(French Football Federation) Lens
7	FW	Mohamed-Amine Bouchenna	15 June 2006 (aged 16)	(French Football Federation) Clermont
9	FW	Joan Tincres	17 June 2006 (aged 16)	(French Football Federation) Monaco
11	FW	Yanis Issoufou	28 October 2006 (aged 16)	(French Football Federation) Montpellier
17	FW	Tidiam Gomis	8 August 2006 (aged 16)	(French Football Federation) Caen
19	FW	Mathis Lambourde	9 January 2006 (aged 17)	(French Football Federation) Rennes
20	FW	Tidiane Diallo	23 June 2006 (aged 16)	(French Football Federation) Strasbourg

=== Scotland ===
Head coach: Brian McLaughlin

Daniel Cummings was replaced by Findlay Marshall due injury.

No.	Pos.	Player	Date of birth (age)	Club
1	GK	Rory Mahady	16 August 2006 (aged 16)	(The Football Association) Leeds
12	GK	Callan McKenna	22 December 2006 (aged 16)	(Scottish Football Association) Queen's Park
2	DF	Rocco Friel	14 October 2006 (aged 16)	(Scottish Football Association) Heart of Midlothian
3	DF	Mitchel Frame	25 January 2006 (aged 17)	(Scottish Football Association) Celtic
4	DF	Ruari Ellis	29 August 2006 (aged 16)	(Scottish Football Association) Kilmarnock
5	DF	Leyton Grant	17 April 2006 (aged 17)	(Scottish Football Association) Rangers
13	DF	Owen Hastie	25 May 2006 (aged 16)	(Scottish Football Association) Hibernian
15	DF	Rudi Molotnikov	23 May 2006 (aged 16)	(Scottish Football Association) Hibernian
20	DF	Josh Dede	4 January 2006 (aged 17)	(Scottish Football Association) Celtic
6	MF	Bailey Rice	4 October 2006 (aged 16)	(Scottish Football Association) Rangers
7	MF	Gabriel Forsyth	4 August 2006 (aged 16)	(Scottish Football Association) Hamilton Accies
8	MF	Lennon Miller	25 August 2006 (aged 16)	(Scottish Football Association) Motherwell
14	MF	Jacob MacIntyre	29 January 2006 (aged 17)	(Scottish Football Association) Hibernian
16	MF	Kyle Ure	14 January 2006 (aged 17)	(Scottish Football Association) Celtic
17	MF	Findlay Marshall	17 April 2006 (aged 17)	(Scottish Football Association) Aberdeen
18	MF	Lennon Connolly	21 March 2006 (aged 17)	(Scottish Football Association) Queen's Park
9	FW	Rory Wilson	5 January 2006 (aged 17)	(The Football Association) Aston Villa
10	FW	Ewan Simpson	28 July 2006 (aged 16)	(The Football Association) Aston Villa
11	FW	Bobby McLuckie	30 June 2006 (aged 16)	(Scottish Football Association) Heart of Midlothian
19	FW	Ryan Oné	26 June 2006 (aged 16)	(Scottish Football Association) Hamilton Accies

=== Germany ===
Head coach: Christian Wück

No.	Pos.	Player	Date of birth (age)	Club
1	GK	Max Schmitt	18 January 2006 (aged 17)	(German Football Association) FC Bayern München
12	GK	Konstantin Heide	27 January 2006 (aged 17)	(German Football Association) SpVgg Unterhaching
2	DF	Taylan Bulut	19 January 2006 (aged 17)	(German Football Association) Schalke 04
3	DF	Almugera Kabar	6 February 2006 (aged 17)	(German Football Association) Borussia Dortmund
5	DF	Maxim Dal	26 January 2006 (aged 17)	(German Football Association) Mainz 05
13	DF	Maximilian Hennig	12 October 2006 (aged 16)	(German Football Association) FC Bayern München
14	DF	David Odogu	3 June 2006 (aged 16)	(German Football Association) VfL Wolfsburg
17	DF	Eric da Silva Moreira	3 May 2006 (aged 17)	(German Football Association) St. Pauli
4	MF	Finn Jeltsch	17 July 2006 (aged 16)	(German Football Association) 1. FC Nürnberg
6	MF	Fayssal Harchaoui	15 January 2006 (aged 17)	(German Football Association) 1. FC Köln
8	MF	**Bence Dárdai**	24 January 2006 (aged 17)	(German Football Association) Hertha BSC
10	MF	Noah Darvich	25 September 2006 (aged 16)	(German Football Association) SC Freiburg
15	MF	Kjell Wätjen	16 February 2006 (aged 17)	(German Football Association) Borussia Dortmund
16	MF	Winners Osawe	29 November 2006 (aged 16)	(German Football Association) RB Leipzig
18	MF	Jarzinho Malanga	10 July 2006 (aged 16)	(German Football Association) VfB Stuttgart
19	MF	Assan Ouédraogo	9 May 2006 (aged 17)	(German Football Association) Schalke 04
7	FW	Paris Brunner	15 February 2006 (aged 17)	(German Football Association) Borussia Dortmund
9	FW	Max Moerstedt	15 January 2006 (aged 17)	(German Football Association) TSG Hoffenheim
11	FW	Charles Herrmann	21 January 2006 (aged 17)	(German Football Association) Borussia Dortmund
20	FW	Robert Ramsak	28 October 2006 (aged 16)	(German Football Association) FC Bayern München

== Group D ==
=== Croatia ===
Head coach: Robert Jarni

No.	Pos.	Player	Date of birth (age)	Club
1	GK	Jan Hlapčić	7 April 2006 (aged 17)	(Croatian Football Federation) Osijek
12	GK	Josip Cundeković	13 October 2006 (aged 16)	(Croatian Football Federation) Gorica
2	DF	Noa Mikić	27 January 2007 (aged 16)	(Croatian Football Federation) Dinamo Zagreb
3	DF	Ante Sušak	20 January 2006 (aged 17)	(Croatian Football Federation) Dinamo Zagreb
4	DF	Marino Skelin	18 September 2006 (aged 16)	(Croatian Football Federation) Hajduk
5	DF	Ljubo Puljić	31 May 2007 (aged 15)	(Croatian Football Federation) Osijek
13	DF	Ante Utrobičić	12 July 2006 (aged 16)	(Croatian Football Federation) Lokomotiva
16	DF	Marko Zebić	8 January 2007 (aged 16)	(Croatian Football Federation) Dinamo Zagreb
6	FW	Sergej Levak	3 May 2006 (aged 17)	(Italian Football Federation) Roma
8	FW	Antonio Kujundžić	20 January 2006 (aged 17)	(Croatian Football Federation) Dinamo Zagreb
10	MF	Noa Skoko	12 January 2006 (aged 17)	(Croatian Football Federation) Hajduk
14	MF	Marin Ćalušić	8 July 2006 (aged 16)	(Croatian Football Federation) Hajduk
15	MF	Branko Pavić	7 November 2006 (aged 16)	(Croatian Football Federation) Dinamo Zagreb
18	MF	Leon Ivančić	12 March 2006 (aged 17)	(Croatian Football Federation) Lokomotiva
7	FW	Bartol Kardum	18 July 2006 (aged 16)	(Croatian Football Federation) Lokomotiva
9	FW	Toni Majić	3 May 2006 (aged 17)	(Croatian Football Federation) Dinamo Zagreb
11	MF	Filip Živković	1 August 2006 (aged 16)	(Croatian Football Federation) Osijek
17	FW	Anton Matković	19 February 2006 (aged 17)	(Croatian Football Federation) Osijek
19	FW	Leo Rimac	14 March 2006 (aged 17)	(Croatian Football Federation) Dinamo Zagreb
20	MF	Leon Lalić	23 January 2006 (aged 17)	(Austrian Football Association) Salzburg

=== Netherlands ===
Head coach: Pieter Schrassert Bert

No.	Pos.	Player	Date of birth (age)	Club
1	GK	Kiyani Zeggen	15 October 2006 (aged 16)	(Royal Dutch Football Association) AZ Alkmaar
16	GK	Tim Haksteeg	19 June 2006 (aged 16)	(Royal Dutch Football Association) Feyenoord
2	DF	Elijah Dijkstra	5 August 2006 (aged 16)	(Royal Dutch Football Association) AZ Alkmaar
3	DF	Rayan Atikallah	7 July 2006 (aged 16)	(Royal Dutch Football Association) AZ Alkmaar
4	DF	Dies Janse	17 January 2006 (aged 17)	(Royal Dutch Football Association) Ajax
5	DF	Mats Rots	11 March 2006 (aged 17)	(Royal Dutch Football Association) Twente
8	DF	Wessel Kuhn	16 September 2006 (aged 16)	(Royal Dutch Football Association) PSV
13	DF	Sven van der Plas	1 February 2006 (aged 17)	(Royal Dutch Football Association) PSV
22	DF	Precious Ugwu	8 February 2006 (aged 17)	(Royal Dutch Football Association) Ajax
6	MF	Avery Appiah	2 April 2006 (aged 17)	(Royal Dutch Football Association) Ajax
10	MF	Tygo Land	11 January 2006 (aged 17)	(Royal Dutch Football Association) PSV
14	MF	Othniël Raterink	7 April 2006 (aged 17)	(Royal Dutch Football Association) De Graafschap
18	MF	Sem Esselink	18 February 2006 (aged 17)	(Royal Dutch Football Association) Sparta Rotterdam
20	MF	Julian Oerip	26 October 2006 (aged 16)	(Royal Dutch Football Association) AZ Alkmaar
7	FW	Robin van Duiven	8 April 2006 (aged 17)	(Royal Dutch Football Association) Jong PSV Eindhoven
9	FW	Martin Sherif	10 June 2006 (aged 16)	(The Football Association) Everton
11	FW	Kayden Wolff	19 June 2006 (aged 16)	(Royal Dutch Football Association) Ajax
17	FW	Zépiqueno Redmond	22 June 2006 (aged 16)	(Royal Dutch Football Association) Feyenoord
19	FW	Jesse Bal	1 October 2006 (aged 16)	(Royal Dutch Football Association) Sparta Rotterdam
21	FW	Jasper Hartog	23 March 2006 (aged 17)	(Royal Dutch Football Association) AZ Alkmaar

=== Switzerland ===
Head coach: Sascha Stauch

No.	Pos.	Player	Date of birth (age)	Club
1	GK	Gentrit Muslija	19 January 2006 (aged 17)	(Swiss Football Association) FC St. Gallen
12	GK	Dario Wälti	23 January 2006 (aged 17)	(Swiss Football Association) FC Thun
2	DF	Loun Srdanovic	4 August 2006 (aged 16)	(Swiss Football Association) Servette FC
3	DF	Rhodri Smith	9 September 2006 (aged 16)	(Swiss Football Association) BSC Young Boys
4	DF	Jeremy Fasano	15 May 2006 (aged 17)	(Swiss Football Association) Grasshopper Club Zurich
5	DF	Elohim Kamoko	14 February 2006 (aged 17)	(Swiss Football Association) FC Zurich
13	DF	Tarik Seferovic	31 December 2006 (aged 16)	(Swiss Football Association) FC St. Gallen
15	DF	Marvin Akahomen	15 July 2007 (aged 15)	(Swiss Football Association) FC Basel
22	DF	Eliah Jordan	7 March 2006 (aged 17)	(Swiss Football Association) FC Basel
6	MF	Demir Xhemalija	7 June 2006 (aged 16)	(Swiss Football Association) FC Basel
7	MF	Cheveyo Tsawa	9 December 2006 (aged 16)	(Swiss Football Association) FC Zurich
8	MF	Alessandro Romano	17 June 2006 (aged 16)	(Italian Football Federation) AS Roma
16	MF	Corsin Konietzke	21 June 2006 (aged 16)	(Swiss Football Association) FC St. Gallen
17	MF	Leon Grando	4 September 2006 (aged 16)	(Swiss Football Association) FC Zurich
18	MF	Luca Bühlmann	26 June 2006 (aged 16)	(Swiss Football Association) FC Basel
20	MF	Elio Rufener	12 February 2007 (aged 16)	(Swiss Football Association) BSC Young Boys
23	MF	Jason Parente	10 June 2006 (aged 16)	(Swiss Football Association) FC St. Gallen
9	FW	Winsley Boteli	5 July 2006 (aged 16)	(German Football Association) Borussia Mönchengladbach
10	FW	Arlet Junior Zé	22 March 2006 (aged 17)	(Swiss Football Association) FC Basel
11	FW	Modou Minteh	4 November 2006 (aged 16)	(Swiss Football Association) FC Basel

=== England ===
Head coach: Ryan Garry

No.	Pos.	Player	Date of birth (age)	Club
1	GK	Tommy Setford	13 March 2006 (aged 17)	(Royal Dutch Football Association) Ajax
13	GK	Ted Curd	14 February 2006 (aged 17)	(The Football Association) Chelsea
2	DF	Josh Acheampong	5 May 2006 (aged 17)	(The Football Association) Chelsea
3	DF	Somtochukwu Boniface	11 March 2006 (aged 17)	(The Football Association) Chelsea
5	DF	Lakyle Samuel	6 May 2006 (aged 17)	(The Football Association) Manchester City
6	DF	Ishé Samuels-Smith	5 June 2006 (aged 16)	(The Football Association) Everton
12	DF	Jayden Meghoma	28 June 2006 (aged 16)	(The Football Association) Southampton
15	DF	Eyimofe Jemide	8 November 2006 (aged 16)	(The Football Association) Crystal Palace
4	MF	**Myles Lewis-Skelly**	26 September 2006 (aged 16)	(The Football Association) Arsenal
8	MF	Archie Gray	12 March 2006 (aged 17)	(The Football Association) Leeds United
10	MF	Michael Golding	23 May 2006 (aged 16)	(The Football Association) Chelsea
14	MF	Isaiah Dada-Mascoll	24 May 2006 (aged 16)	(The Football Association) Manchester City
16	MF	Finley McAllister	16 July 2006 (aged 16)	(The Football Association) Manchester United
18	MF	Kiano Dyer	21 November 2006 (aged 16)	(The Football Association) Chelsea
7	FW	Justin Oboavwoduo	23 August 2006 (aged 16)	(The Football Association) Manchester City
9	FW	Leon Chiwome	10 January 2006 (aged 17)	(The Football Association) Wolverhampton Wanderers
11	FW	Ethan Nwaneri	21 March 2007 (aged 16)	(The Football Association) Arsenal
17	FW	Tyler Dibling	12 March 2006 (aged 17)	(The Football Association) Southampton
19	FW	Zak Lovelace	23 January 2006 (aged 17)	(Scottish Football Association) Rangers
20	FW	Kadan Young	19 January 2006 (aged 17)	(The Football Association) Aston Villa
