= 2023 UEFA European Under-17 Championship =

2023-es U17-es labdarúgó-Európa-bajnokság

Tournament details
- Host country: Hungary
- Dates: 17 May – 2 June
- Teams: 16 (from 1 confederation)
- Venues: 7 (in 6 host cities)

Final positions
- Champions: Germany (4th title)
- Runners-up: France

Tournament statistics
- Matches played: 32
- Goals scored: 111 (3.47 per match)
- Attendance: 27,992 (875 per match)
- Top scorer(s): (Germany) Paris Brunner (Germany) Robert Ramsak (Spain) Marc Guiu (Spain) Lamine Yamal (4 goals each)
- Best player: (Germany) Paris Brunner

The 2023 UEFA European Under-17 Championship (also known as UEFA Under-17 Euro 2023) was the 20th UEFA European Under-17 Championship (39th edition if the Under-16 era is also included), the annual international youth football championship organised by UEFA for the men's under-17 national teams of Europe. Hungary hosted the tournament. A total of 16 teams played in the tournament, with players born on or after 1 January 2006 eligible to participate.

Same as previous editions held in odd-numbered years, the tournament acted as the UEFA qualifiers for the FIFA U-17 World Cup. The top five teams of the tournament qualified for the 2023 FIFA U-17 World Cup in Indonesia as the UEFA representatives.

France, having won the title in 2022, entered as the title holders, but would lose in the final to Germany, who won their fourth title.

== Host selection ==
- 19 April 2021: Selection of successful host associations by the UEFA Executive Committee at its meeting in Montreux

For the UEFA European Under-17 Championship final tournaments of 2023 and 2024, Hungary and Cyprus were selected as hosts respectively.

== Qualification ==
All 55 UEFA nations entered the competition, and with the hosts Hungary qualifying automatically, the other 54 teams competed in the qualifying competition, which consisted of two rounds: Qualifying round, which took place in autumn 2022, and Elite round, which took place in spring 2023, to determine the remaining 15 spots in the final tournament.

=== Qualified teams ===
The following teams qualified for the final tournament.

Note: All appearance statistics include only U-17 era (since 2002).

Team	Method of qualification	Appearance	Last appearance	Previous best performance
Hungary	Hosts	6th	2019 (Fifth place)	Fifth place (2019)
Serbia	Elite round Group 1 winners	9th^{2}	2022 (Semi-finals)	Semi-finals (2022)
Wales	Elite round Group 2 winners	1st	Debut	
Netherlands	Elite round Group 3 winners	15th	2022 (Runners-up)	Champions (2011, 2012, 2018, 2019)
Spain	Elite round Group 4 winners	15th	2022 (Quarter-finals)	Champions (2007, 2008, 2017)
Portugal	Elite round Group 5 winners	10th	2022 (Semi-finals)	Champions (2003, 2016)
Republic of Ireland	Elite round Group 6 winners	6th	2019 (Group stage)	Quarter-finals (2017, 2018)
Croatia	Elite round Group 7 winners	5th	2017 (Group stage)	Fourth place (2005)
France	Elite round Group 8 winners	14th	2022 (Champions)	Champions (2004, 2015, 2022)
Scotland	Elite round Group 2 runners-up^{1}	7th	2022 (Group stage)	Semi-finals (2014)
England	Elite round Group 3 runners-up^{1}	15th	2019 (Group stage)	Champions (2010, 2014)
Germany	Elite round Group 4 runners-up^{1}	14th	2022 (Quarter-finals)	Champions (2009)
Poland	Elite round Group 5 runners-up^{1}	4th	2022 (Group stage)	Semi-finals (2012)
Italy	Elite round Group 6 runners-up^{1}	11th	2022 (Quarter-finals)	Runners-up (2013, 2018, 2019)
Slovenia	Elite round Group 7 runners-up^{1}	4th	2018 (Group stage)	Group stage (2012, 2015, 2018)
Switzerland	Elite round Group 8 runners-up^{1}	9th	2018 (Group stage)	Champions (2002)

Notes
^{1} The best seven runners-up among all eight elite round groups qualified for the final tournament.
^{2} Two as Serbia and Montenegro and seven as Serbia

=== Final draw ===
The final draw was made on 3 April 2023 at Ensana Thermal Margaret Island Health Spa Hotel, Budapest.

Pos	Grp	Team	Pld	W	D	L	GF	GA	GD	Pts	Seeding
1	—	Hungary (H)	0	0	0	0	0	0	0	0	Host (A1)
2	8	France	3	3	0	0	8	2	+6	9	Pot 1
3	5	Portugal	3	3	0	0	5	0	+5	9	Pot 1
4	6	Republic of Ireland	3	2	1	0	8	4	+4	7	Pot 1
5	4	Spain	3	2	1	0	6	4	+2	7	Pot 1
6	3	Netherlands	3	2	1	0	5	3	+2	7	Pot 1
7	7	Croatia	3	2	1	0	3	1	+2	7	Pot 1
8	1	Serbia	3	2	0	1	9	2	+7	6	Pot 1
9	2	Wales	3	1	2	0	7	5	+2	5	A3
10	6	Italy	3	2	1	0	7	3	+4	7	Pot 2
11	4	Germany	3	2	0	1	12	5	+7	6	Pot 2
12	5	Poland	3	2	0	1	6	1	+5	6	Pot 2
13	3	England	3	2	0	1	5	2	+3	6	Pot 2
14	8	Switzerland	3	1	1	1	7	5	+2	4	Pot 2
15	7	Slovenia	3	1	1	1	3	3	0	4	Pot 2
16	2	Scotland	3	1	1	1	4	5	−1	4	Pot 2

Source: UEFA
Rules for classification: 1) points; 2) goal difference; 3) goals scored; 4) disciplinary points; 5) coefficient; 6) drawing of lots.
(H) Hosts

== Venues ==
The tournament was hosted in 7 venues.

Debrecen	Balmazújváros	Budaörs
Nagyerdei Stadion	Városi Sportpálya	Árok utcai pálya
Capacity: 20,340	Capacity: 2,435	Capacity: 1,204
4 group games	4 group games, 1 quarter-final	3 group games, World Cup play-off
2023 UEFA European Under-17 Championship is located in Hungary		Budapest
2023 UEFA European Under-17 Championship is located in Hungary		Hidegkuti Nándor Stadion
2023 UEFA European Under-17 Championship is located in Hungary		Capacity: 5,322
2023 UEFA European Under-17 Championship is located in Hungary		4 group games, 1 quarter-final, final
Telki	Debrecen	Felcsút
Telki Training Centre	DEAC Stadion	Pancho Aréna
Capacity: 1,000	Capacity: 1,500	Capacity: 3,816
2 group games, 1 quarter-final	4 group games, 1 quarter-final	3 group games, 2 semi-finals

== Match officials ==
The following officials were appointed for the final tournament:

Referees

- (Azerbaijan) Elchin Masiyev
- (Northern Ireland) Jamie Robinson
- (Poland) Damian Sylwestrzak
- (Serbia) Miloš Milanović
- (Slovakia) Michal Očenáš
- (Slovenia) David Šmajc
- (Sweden) Adam Ladebäck
- (Turkey) Atilla Karaoglan
- (Belgium) Lothar D'Hondt
- (Bulgaria) Radoslav Gidzhenov
- (Finland) Oliver Reitala
- (Scotland) David Dickinson

Assistant referees

- (Albania) Nertil Bregasi
- (Andorra) Andreu Vilanova
- (Azerbaijan) Elsad Abdullayev
- (Cyprus) Kyriakos Sokratous
- (Greece) Konstandinos Psarris
- (Northern Ireland) Adam Jeffrey
- (Poland) Bartosz Heinig
- (Serbia) Milan Šutulović
- (Slovakia) Peter Bednar
- (Slovenia) David Gabrovec
- (Turkey) Mehmet Tugral
- (Sweden) Daniel Yng

== Group stage ==
The group winners and runners-up advanced to the quarter-finals.

Tie-breaking criteria for group play
The ranking of teams in the group stage was determined as follows:
1. Points obtained in all group matches;
2. Points in head-to-head matches among tied teams;
3. Goal difference in head-to-head matches among tied teams;
4. Goals scored in head-to-head matches among tied teams;
5. If more than two teams were tied, and after applying all head-to-head criteria above, a subset of teams were still tied, all head-to-head criteria above were reapplied exclusively to this subset of teams;
6. Goal difference in all group matches;
7. Goals scored in all group matches;
8. Penalty shoot-out if only two teams had the same number of points, and they met in the last round of the group and were tied after applying all criteria above (not used if more than two teams had the same number of points, or if their rankings were not relevant for qualification for the next stage);
9. Disciplinary points
  - Yellow card: −1 point;
  - Indirect red card (second yellow card): −3 points;
  - Direct red card: −3 points;
10. UEFA coefficient for the qualifying round draw;
11. Drawing of lots.

=== Group A ===
Pos	Team	Pld	W	D	L	GF	GA	GD	Pts	Qualification
1	Poland	3	2	0	1	10	7	+3	6	Knockout stage
2	Republic of Ireland	3	2	0	1	8	7	+1	6	Knockout stage
3	Hungary (H)	3	1	0	2	8	9	−1	3	
4	Wales	3	1	0	2	3	6	−3	3	

Source: UEFA
Rules for classification: Group stage tiebreakers
(H) Hosts
17 May 2023
16:30

Poland	5–1	Republic of Ireland
Skoczylas 13', 49'; Szala 44'; Borys 54'; Kądziołka 65'	Report	Orazi 5'

Hidegkuti Nándor Stadion, Budapest
Attendance: 412
Referee: Atilla Karaoglan (Turkey)
17 May 2023
20:00

Hungary	3–0	Wales
Simon 43'; Szabó 75'; Umathum 81'	Report

Hidegkuti Nándor Stadion, Budapest
Attendance: 3,480
Referee: Adam Ladebäck (Sweden)

20 May 2023
16:30

Republic of Ireland	3–0	Wales
Razi 24'; Orazi 34'; Akachukwu 61'	Report

Pancho Aréna, Felcsút
Attendance: 714
Referee: Elchin Masiyev (Azerbaijan)
20 May 2023
20:00

Hungary	3–5	Poland
Varga 55'; Simon 70'; Molnár 90+4'	Report	Skoczylas 8'; Sznaucner 34'; Huras 52'; Tomczyk 76'; Borys 80'

Pancho Aréna, Felcsút
Attendance: 2,921
Referee: Miloš Milanović (Serbia)

23 May 2023
20:00

Republic of Ireland	4–2	Hungary
Kehir 5', 61'; Melia 24', 31'	Report	Grante 10' (o.g.); Kern 72'

Pancho Aréna, Felcsút
Attendance: 2,577
Referee: Atilla Karaoglan (Turkey)
23 May 2023
20:00

Wales	3–0	Poland
Biancheri 82'; I. Morgan 89', 90+1'	Report

Árok utcai pálya, Budaörs
Attendance: 318
Referee: David Dickinson (Scotland)

=== Group B ===
Pos	Team	Pld	W	D	L	GF	GA	GD	Pts	Qualification
1	Spain	3	2	1	0	6	3	+3	7	Knockout stage
2	Serbia	3	1	1	1	5	5	0	4	Knockout stage
3	Italy	3	1	0	2	4	4	0	3	
4	Slovenia	3	1	0	2	5	8	−3	3	

Source: UEFA
Rules for classification: Group stage tiebreakers
18 May 2023
17:00

Serbia	2–4	Slovenia
Cvetković 66'; Petrović 82'	Report	Pejičić 4'; Topalović 10'; Jakupović 34'; Hrvatin 52'

Telki Training Centre, Telki
Attendance: 308
Referee: Jamie Robinson (Northern Ireland)
18 May 2023
20:00

Italy	1–2	Spain
Ragnoli Galli 15'	Report	Guiu 53', 75'

Árok utcai pálya, Budaörs
Attendance: 1,060
Referee: Miloš Milanović (Serbia)

21 May 2023
16:30

Spain	3–1	Slovenia
Guiu 28'; Mesa 45+1'; Yamal 50' (pen.)	Report	Topalović 54'

Hidegkuti Nándor Stadion, Budapest
Attendance: 917
Referee: Michal Očenáš (Slovakia)
21 May 2023
20:00

Serbia	2–0	Italy
Maksimović 39'; Cvetković 59'	Report

Hidegkuti Nándor Stadion, Budapest
Attendance: 574
Referee: Adam Ladebäck (Sweden)

24 May 2023
17:00

Spain	1–1	Serbia
Yamal 78'	Report	Maksimović 68'

Árok utcai pálya, Budaörs
Attendance: 815
Referee: Damian Sylwestrzak (Poland)
24 May 2023
17:00

Slovenia	0–3	Italy
	Report	Mannini 60', 82'; De Pieri 87'

Telki Training Centre, Telki
Attendance: 181
Referee: Elchin Masiyev (Azerbaijan)

=== Group C ===
Pos	Team	Pld	W	D	L	GF	GA	GD	Pts	Qualification
1	Germany	3	3	0	0	10	1	+9	9	Knockout stage
2	France	3	1	1	1	5	5	0	4	Knockout stage
3	Portugal	3	1	1	1	3	6	−3	4	
4	Scotland	3	0	0	3	2	8	−6	0	

Source: UEFA
Rules for classification: Group stage tiebreakers
17 May 2023
16:30

Scotland	1–3	France
Wilson 71'	Report	Issoufou 5'; Gadou 45'; Ellis 75' (o.g.)

Nagyerdei Stadion, Debrecen
Attendance: 298
Referee: Elchin Masiyev (Azerbaijan)
17 May 2023
20:00

Portugal	0–4	Germany
	Report	Darvich 32'; Kabar 39'; Ramsak 59', 90+4'

Nagyerdei Stadion, Debrecen
Attendance: 409
Referee: Damian Sylwestrzak (Poland)

20 May 2023
15:00

Portugal	2–1	Scotland
Tomé 3'; Sousa 20'	Report	Connolly 88'

DEAC Stadion, Debrecen
Attendance: 575
Referee: David Šmajc (Slovenia)
20 May 2023
20:00

France	1–3	Germany
Sylla 39'	Report	Brunner 56', 63'; Ramsak 60'

Városi Sportpálya, Balmazújváros
Attendance: 765
Referee: Atilla Karaoglan (Turkey)

23 May 2023
15:00

France	1–1	Portugal
Gomis 10'	Report	Patrício 41'

Városi Sportpálya, Balmazújváros
Attendance: 507
Referee: Adam Ladebäck (Sweden)
23 May 2023
15:00

Germany	3–0	Scotland
Darvich 49'; Dárdai 54'; Wätjen 90+1'	Report

DEAC Stadion, Debrecen
Attendance: 348
Referee: Oliver Reitala (Finland)

=== Group D ===
Pos	Team	Pld	W	D	L	GF	GA	GD	Pts	Qualification
1	England	3	2	1	0	5	1	+4	7	Knockout stage
2	Switzerland	3	2	1	0	4	1	+3	7	Knockout stage
3	Croatia	3	0	1	2	2	4	−2	1	
4	Netherlands	3	0	1	2	2	7	−5	1	

Source: UEFA
Rules for classification: Group stage tiebreakers
18 May 2023
15:00

Switzerland	2–0	Netherlands
Boteli 49'; Zé 54'	Report

DEAC Stadion, Debrecen
Attendance: 411
Referee: Michal Očenáš (Slovakia)
18 May 2023
20:00

Croatia	0–1	England
	Report	Nwaneri 8'

Városi Sportpálya, Balmazújváros
Attendance: 700
Referee: David Šmajc (Slovenia)

21 May 2023
16:30

Croatia	1–2	Switzerland
Levak 32'	Report	Xhemalija 9'; Akahomen 83'

Nagyerdei Stadion, Debrecen
Attendance: 710
Referee: Jamie Robinson (Northern Ireland)
21 May 2023
20:00

Netherlands	1–4	England
Hartog 71'	Report	Lewis-Skelly 7'; Dada-Mascoll 80', 90+3' (pen.); Oboavwoduo 90+4'

Nagyerdei Stadion, Debrecen
Attendance: 611
Referee: Damian Sylwestrzak (Poland)

24 May 2023
15:00

Netherlands	1–1	Croatia
Bal 53'	Report	Puljić 66'

Városi Sportpálya, Balmazújváros
Attendance: 458
Referee: Radoslav Gidzhenov (Bulgaria)
24 May 2023
15:00

England	0–0	Switzerland
	Report

DEAC Stadion, Debrecen
Attendance: 427
Referee: Lothar D'Hondt (Belgium)

== Knockout stage ==
In the knockout stage, a penalty shoot-out was used to decide the winner if necessary (no extra time was played).

=== Bracket ===
Quarter-finals
27 May – Telki
Poland	3
Serbia	2
27 May – Debrecen
Germany (p)	1 (3)
Switzerland	1 (2)
27 May – Budapest
Spain	3
Republic of Ireland	0
27 May – Balmazújváros
England	0
France	1

Semi-finals
30 May – Felcsút
Poland	3
Germany	5
30 May – Felcsút
Spain	1
France	3

Final
2 June – Budapest
Germany	0 (5)
France	0 (4)
World Cup play-off
30 May – Budaörs
England	4
Switzerland	2

=== Quarter-finals ===
Winners qualified for 2023 FIFA U-17 World Cup. The two best losing quarter-finalists entered the FIFA U-17 World Cup play-off.

27 May 2023
15:00

Poland	3–2	Serbia
Krzyżanowski 4'; Mikołajewski 62' (pen.); Rejczyk 89'	Report	Vukojević 51'; Subotić 70'

Telki Training Centre, Telki
Attendance: 288
Referee: Elchin Masiyev (Azerbaijan)

27 May 2023
15:00

Germany	1–1	Switzerland
Brunner 49'	Report	Boteli 16' (pen.)
Penalties
Ramsak (penalty scored); Osawe (penalty missed); Dárdai (penalty scored); Wätjen (penalty scored)	3–2	(penalty scored) Parente; (penalty scored) Fasano; (penalty missed) Grando; (penalty missed) Smith; (penalty missed) Boteli

DEAC Stadion, Debrecen
Attendance: 243
Referee: Jamie Robinson (Northern Ireland)

27 May 2023
20:00

Spain	3–0	Republic of Ireland
Granados 22'; Guiu 69'; Yamal 72'	Report

Hidegkuti Nándor Stadion, Budapest
Attendance: 893
Referee: Miloš Milanović (Serbia)

27 May 2023
20:00

England	0–1	France
	Report	Lambourde 89' (pen.)

Városi Sportpálya, Balmazújváros
Attendance: 411
Referee: Atilla Karaoglan (Turkey)

==== Ranking of losing quarter-finalists ====
To determine the two best losing quarter-finalists which entered the FIFA U-17 World Cup play-off, the losing quarter-finalists were ranked by the following criteria (Regulations Article 16.06):

1. Position in the group stage (i.e., group winners ahead of group runners-up);
2. Results in the group stage (i.e., points, goal difference, goals scored);
3. Results in the quarter-finals (i.e., points, goal difference, goals scored);
4. Disciplinary points in the group stage and quarter-finals combined;
5. UEFA coefficient for the qualifying round draw;
6. Drawing of lots.

Pos	Grp	Team	Pld	W	D	L	GF	GA	GD	Pts	Qualification
1	D1	England	3	2	1	0	5	1	+4	7	FIFA U-17 World Cup play-off
2	D2	Switzerland	3	2	1	0	4	1	+3	7	FIFA U-17 World Cup play-off
3	A2	Republic of Ireland	3	2	0	1	8	7	+1	6	
4	B2	Serbia	3	1	1	1	5	5	0	4	

Source: UEFA

=== FIFA U-17 World Cup play-off ===
Winner qualified for 2023 FIFA U-17 World Cup.

30 May 2023
15:00

England	4–2	Switzerland
Gray 17'; Lovelace 67'; Golding 68'; Young 76'	Report	Rufener 45+1'; Xhemalija 52'

Árok utcai pálya, Budaörs
Attendance: 138
Referee: Damian Sylwestrzak (Poland)

=== Semi-finals ===
30 May 2023
16:30

Poland	3–5	Germany
Mikołajewski 7'; Borys 31'; Wolski 68'	Report	Moerstedt 22'; Brunner 57'; Herrmann 65'; Ouédraogo 79'; Ramsak 83'

Pancho Aréna, Felcsút
Attendance: 627
Referee: Michal Ocenáš (Slovakia)

30 May 2023
20:00

Spain	1–3	France
Yamal 69'	Report	Lambourde 73'; Issoufou 80'; Gomis 90+1'

Pancho Aréna, Felcsút
Attendance: 879
Referee: Adam Ladebäck (Sweden)

=== Final ===
2 June 2023
20:00

Germany	0–0	France
	Report
Penalties
Darvich (penalty missed); Herrmann (penalty scored); Dárdai (penalty scored); Bulut (penalty scored); Brunner (penalty scored); Ouédraogo (penalty scored)	5–4	(penalty scored) Kayi Sanda; (penalty scored) Lambourde; (penalty scored) Tincres; (penalty scored) Sangui; (penalty missed) Sylla; (penalty missed) Bouabré

Hidegkuti Nándor Stadion, Budapest
Attendance: 4,017
Referee: Atilla Karaoglan (Turkey)

== Goalscorers ==
There were 111 goals scored in 31 matches, for an average of 3.58 goals per match.

4 goals

- (Germany) Paris Brunner
- (Germany) Robert Ramsak
- (Spain) Marc Guiu
- (Spain) Lamine Yamal

3 goals

- (Poland) Karol Borys
- (Poland) Mateusz Skoczylas

2 goals

- (England) Isaiah Dada-Mascoll
- (France) Tidiam Gomis
- (France) Yanis Ali Issoufou
- (France) Mathis Lambourde
- (Germany) Noah Darvich
- (Hungary) Benedek Simon
- (Republic of Ireland) Luke Kehir
- (Republic of Ireland) Mason Melia
- (Republic of Ireland) Ikechukwu Orazi
- (Italy) Mattia Mannini
- (Poland) Daniel Mikołajewski
- (Serbia) Mihajlo Cvetković
- (Serbia) Andrija Maksimović
- (Slovenia) Luka Topalović
- (Switzerland) Winsley Boteli
- (Switzerland) Demir Xhemalija
- (Wales) Iwan Morgan

1 goal

- (Croatia) Sergej Levak
- (Croatia) Ljubo Puljić
- (England) Michael Golding
- (England) Archie Gray
- (England) Myles Lewis-Skelly
- (England) Zak Lovelace
- (England) Ethan Nwaneri
- (England) Justin Oboavwoduo
- (England) Kadan Young
- (France) Joane Kouakou Gadou
- (France) Fodé Sylla
- (Germany) Bence Dárdai
- (Germany) Charles Herrmann
- (Germany) Almugera Kabar
- (Germany) Max Moerstedt
- (Germany) Assan Ouédraogo
- (Germany) Kjell Wätjen
- (Hungary) Martin Kern
- (Hungary) Csaba Molnár
- (Hungary) Szilárd Szabó
- (Hungary) Ádám Umathum
- (Hungary) Zétény Varga
- (Italy) Giacomo De Pieri
- (Italy) Federico Ragnoli Galli
- (Netherlands) Jesse Bal
- (Netherlands) Jasper Hartog
- (Poland) Mike Huras
- (Poland) Szymon Kądziołka
- (Poland) Jakub Krzyżanowski
- (Poland) Filip Rejczyk
- (Poland) Dominik Szala
- (Poland) Maksymilian Sznaucner
- (Poland) Oskar Tomczyk
- (Poland) Filip Wolski
- (Portugal) Nuno Patrício
- (Portugal) Gonçalo Sousa
- (Portugal) Olívio Tomé
- (Republic of Ireland) Romeo Akachukwu
- (Republic of Ireland) Naj Razi
- (Scotland) Lennon Connolly
- (Scotland) Rory Wilson
- (Serbia) Andrej Petrović
- (Serbia) Andrej Subotić
- (Serbia) Veljko Vukojević
- (Slovenia) Rene Hrvatin
- (Slovenia) Aldin Jakupović
- (Slovenia) David Pejičić
- (Spain) Alejandro Granados
- (Spain) Óscar Mesa
- (Switzerland) Marvin Akahomen
- (Switzerland) Elio Rufener
- (Switzerland) Arlet Junior Zé
- (Wales) Gabriele Biancheri

1 own goal

- (Republic of Ireland) Jake Grante (against Hungary)
- (Scotland) Ruari Ellis (against France)

Source: UEFA

== Awards ==
The following awards were given at the conclusion of the tournament:

- Player of the Tournament: (Germany) Paris Brunner
- Top Scorer: (Germany) Robert Ramsak / (Germany) Paris Brunner / (Spain) Marc Guiu / (Spain) Lamine Yamal (4 goals each)

=== Team of the Tournament ===
After the tournament, the Under-17 Team of the Tournament was selected by the UEFA Technical Observer panel.

Position	Player
Goalkeeper	(Germany) Max Schmitt
Defenders	(Germany) Eric da Silva Moreira
Defenders	(Germany) Finn Jeltsch
Defenders	(England) Ishé Samuels-Smith
Defenders	(France) Nhoa Sangui
Midfielders	(Germany) Noah Darvich
Midfielders	(Germany) Fayssal Harchaoui
Midfielders	(France) Saïmon Bouabré
Forwards	(Spain) Lamine Yamal
Forwards	(Spain) Marc Guiu
Forwards	(Germany) Paris Brunner

== Qualified teams for FIFA U-17 World Cup ==
The following five teams from UEFA qualified for the 2023 FIFA U-17 World Cup in Indonesia.

Team	Qualified on	Previous appearances in FIFA U-17 World Cup^{1}
Poland	27 May 2023	2 (1993, 1999)
Germany	27 May 2023	10 (1985, 1991, 1995, 1997, 1999, 2007, 2009, 2011, 2015, 2017)
Spain	27 May 2023	10 (1991, 1995, 1997, 1999, 2001, 2003, 2007, 2009, 2017, 2019)
France	27 May 2023	7 (1987, **2001**, 2007, 2011, 2015, 2017, 2019)
England	30 May 2023	4 (2007, 2011, 2015, **2017**)

^{1} Bold indicates champions for that year. Italic indicates hosts for that year.
