= Marc Guiu =

Spanish footballer (born 2006)

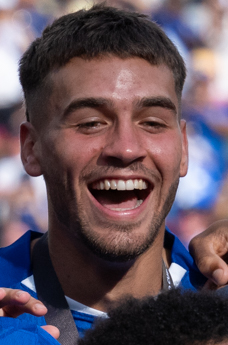
- Guiu with Chelsea in 2025

Personal information
- Full name: Marc Guiu Paz
- Date of birth: 4 January 2006 (age 20)
- Place of birth: Granollers, Spain
- Height: 1.89 m (6 ft 2 in)
- Position: Striker

Team information
- Current team: RB Leipzig
- Number: 9

Youth career
- 2010–2013: PB Sant Celoni
- 2013–2023: Barcelona

Senior career*
Years	Team	Apps	(Gls)
2023–2024	Barcelona B	13	(4)
2023–2024	Barcelona	3	(1)
2024–2026	Chelsea	11	(0)
2025	→ Sunderland (loan)	2	(0)
2026–	RB Leipzig	1	(0)

International career^{‡}
2022–2023	Spain U17	17	(10)
2024–	Spain U19	9	(1)
2025–	Spain U21	2	(1)
- * Club domestic league appearances and goals as of 22:16, 5 September 2026 (UTC) ‡ National team caps and goals as of 19:31, 7 April 2026 (UTC)

Marc Guiu Paz (Catalan pronunciation: [ˈmark ˈgiw]; born 4 January 2006) is a Spanish professional footballer who plays as a striker for Bundesliga club RB Leipzig.

== Club career ==
=== Barcelona ===
Born in Granollers, Barcelona, Catalonia, Guiu began his career with Penya Barcelonista Sant Celoni, a fan club of La Liga side Barcelona. He went on to join Barcelona themselves in the 2013–14 season, and progressed through the La Masia academy, and was called up to the senior squad for the first time in June 2023, ahead of pre-season matches against Celta Vigo and Japanese opposition Vissel Kobe. Guiu made his unofficial debut for Barcelona in the latter game, coming on as a half-time substitute for Robert Lewandowski.

On 11 October 2023, he was again called up to the senior squad for a La Liga fixture against Granada, though he did not eventually feature in the game. In the same month, he was named by English newspaper The Guardian as one of the best players born in 2006 worldwide. On 22 October, Guiu made his senior competitive debut as a 79th-minute substitute, scoring the winning goal in 23 seconds with his second touch of a 1–0 victory over Athletic Bilbao. At 17 years and 291 days of age, he became the youngest and fastest debutant to score for Barcelona in La Liga.

Guiu made his Champions League debut three days later in a 2–1 win against Shakhtar Donetsk. He scored his first goal in the competition and second of the season on 13 December in a 3–2 defeat against Royal Antwerp.

=== Chelsea ===
On 1 July 2024, Guiu joined Premier League side Chelsea for a reported €6 million fee, signing a five-year contract with the club. On 18 August, he made his debut for the club, as a substitute, in a 2–0 loss against Manchester City in the league. On 19 December, Guiu scored a first-half hat-trick against Shamrock Rovers in a 5–1 victory in the final league match of the 2024–25 UEFA Europa Conference League.

On 6 August 2025, Guiu joined newly promoted Premier League club Sunderland on a season-long loan. On 31 August, Chelsea recalled Guiu from his loan, after making two league appearances and scoring a goal in an EFL Cup tie against Huddersfield Town, due to Liam Delap's injury. Later that year, on 22 October, he scored his first Champions League goal with the club in a 5–1 victory over Ajax, becoming the second-youngest player to score for Chelsea in the competition, behind only his teammate Estêvão Willian, who also found the net in the same match.

=== RB Leipzig ===
On 1 September 2026, Guiu joined Bundesliga side RB Leipzig for a reported €16 million fee, signing a contract until 2031.

== International career ==
Guiu has represented Spain at Under-17 and Under-19 level.

In May 2023, he was called up by Spain U17 to compete in the 2023 UEFA European Under-17 Championship, in which he became the competitions joint top scorer with four goals, alongside Paris Brunner, Robert Ramsak and teammate Lamine Yamal. In November 2023, he represented Spain U17 in the 2023 FIFA U-17 World Cup, when he scored two goals.

== Style of play ==
Barcelona youth coach Iván Carrasco describes Guiu as a "classic '9', a specialist in the area who exploits his physical power". He has been compared to Samuel Eto'o. He has a good high ball game, pace, strength and work-rate. Spanish football expert Guillem Balagué described Guiu as a striker who is known to be "more efficient in the box".

== Career statistics ==
As of match played 10 September 2026

Appearances and goals by club, season and competition
Club	Season	League			National cup (Note: Includes Copa del Rey, FA Cup)		League cup (Note: Includes EFL Cup)		Europe		Other		Total	
Club	Season	Division	Apps	Goals	Apps	Goals	Apps	Goals	Apps	Goals	Apps	Goals	Apps	Goals
Barcelona Atlètic	2023–24	Primera Federación	13	4	—		—		—		4 (Note: Appearances in Primera Federación play-offs)	2	17	6
Barcelona	2023–24	La Liga	3	1	2	0	—		2 (Note: Appearance(s) in UEFA Champions League)	1	0	0	7	2
Chelsea	2024–25	Premier League	3	0	1	0	1	0	9 (Note: Appearances in UEFA Conference League)	6	2 (Note: Appearances in FIFA Club World Cup)	0	16	6
Chelsea	2025–26	Premier League	8	0	2	1	2	0	1	1	—		13	2
Chelsea	Total		11	0	3	1	3	0	10	7	2	0	29	8
Sunderland (loan)	2025–26	Premier League	2	0	—		1	1	—		—		3	1
RB Leipzig	2026–27	Bundesliga	1	0	0	0	—		1	0	—		2	0
Career total			30	5	5	1	4	1	13	8	6	2	58	17

== Honours ==
Chelsea

- UEFA Conference League: 2024–25
- FIFA Club World Cup: 2025
- FA Cup runner-up: 2025–26

Individual

- UEFA European Under-17 Championship joint top scorer: 2023
- UEFA European Under-17 Championship Team of the Tournament: 2023
