= Maksymilian Sznaucner =

Polish footballer

Personal information
- Full name: Maksymilian Mirosław Sznaucer
- Date of birth: 30 March 2006 (age 20)
- Place of birth: Thessaloniki, Greece
- Height: 1.76 m (5 ft 9 in)
- Position: Central midfielder

Team information
- Current team: Arka Gdynia
- Number: 27

Youth career
- 2010–2025: PAOK

Senior career*
| Years | Team | Apps | (Gls) |
| 2023–2026 | PAOK B | 36 | (0) |
| 2026– | Arka Gdynia | 0 | (0) |

International career^{‡}
| 2022 | Poland U16 | 5 | (0) |
| 2022–2023 | Poland U17 | 17 | (1) |
| 2023–2024 | Poland U18 | 7 | (0) |
| 2024–2025 | Poland U19 | 12 | (1) |
| 2025– | Poland U20 | 1 | (0) |
- * Club domestic league appearances and goals as of 08:36, 30 March 2026 (UTC) ‡ National team caps and goals as of 20:55, 10 September 2025 (UTC)

Maksymilian Mirosław Sznaucner (born 30 March 2006) is professional footballer who plays as a central midfielder for I liga club Arka Gdynia. Born in Greece, he represents Poland internationally at youth level.

== Club career ==
Sznaucner made his debut in Super League 2 on 7 October 2023 against AEK B. On 27 May 2026, he signed a two-year deal with Polish second tier side Arka Gdynia.

== International career ==
Despite being born in Greece, Sznaucner represents Poland. He was a member of the Poland U17 team that reached the semi-finals at the UEFA Under-17 Euro 2023, and he scored a goal in a 5–3 victory against Hungary. He also played at the 2023 FIFA U-17 World Cup.

== Personal life ==
Sznaucner was born and raised in Greece to Polish parents. His father Mirosław Sznaucner was a professional footballer and was a long-term assistant coach at PAOK. His younger brother Leon plays for PAOK's Academy.

== Career statistics ==
As of match played 22 November 2025

Appearances and goals by club, season and competition
| Club | Season | League | | | National cup | | Europe | | Other | | Total | |
| Club | Season | Division | Apps | Goals | Apps | Goals | Apps | Goals | Apps | Goals | Apps | Goals |
|---|---|---|---|---|---|---|---|---|---|---|---|---|
| PAOK B | 2023–24 | Super League Greece 2 | 16 | 0 | — | | — | | — | | 16 | 0 |
| PAOK B | 2024–25 | Super League Greece 2 | 10 | 0 | — | | — | | — | | 10 | 0 |
| PAOK B | 2025–26 | Super League Greece 2 | 10 | 0 | — | | — | | — | | 10 | 0 |
| PAOK B | Total | | 36 | 0 | — | | — | | — | | 36 | 0 |
| Arka Gdynia | 2026–27 | I liga | 0 | 0 | 0 | 0 | — | | — | | 0 | 0 |
| Career total | | | 36 | 0 | 0 | 0 | 0 | 0 | 0 | 0 | 36 | 0 |

== Honours ==
PAOK U19

- Greek Cup U19: 2025
