= Diego Mascardi =

Italian footballer (born 2006)

Personal information
- Date of birth: 26 September 2006 (age 20)
- Place of birth: Carrara, Italy
- Height: 1.98 m (6 ft 6 in)
- Position: Goalkeeper

Team information
- Current team: Torino
- Number: 26

Youth career
- Don Bosco Fossone
- 2013–2025: Spezia

Senior career*
Years	Team	Apps	(Gls)
2025–2026	Spezia	17	(0)
2026–	Torino	2	(0)

International career^{‡}
2023	Italy U17	3	(0)
2023–2024	Italy U18	3	(0)
2025	Italy U19	1	(0)
2025–	Italy U21	2	(0)
- * Club domestic league appearances and goals as of 15:02, 6 November 2026 (UTC) ‡ National team caps and goals as of 15:02, 6 November 2026 (UTC)

Diego Mascardi (born 26 September 2006) is an Italian professional footballer who plays as a goalkeeper for Serie A club Torino.

== Club career ==
Born in Carrara, Mascardi began playing football with Don Bosco Fossone, joining the youth academy of Spezia in 2013 at the age of 8. He signed his first professional contract in 2023. On 30 September 2024, he extended his contract with the club until 2028. On 18 August 2025, he made his professional debut with Spezia in a Coppa Italia match against Sampdoria, a 1–1 (5–3) penalthy shootout win where he saved two penalties. In his debut season, he made 17 Serie B appearances.

On 16 July 2026, he transferred to Serie A club Torino, ahead of the 2026–27 season, on a contract until 2031.

== International career ==
Mascardi was called up to the Italy U17s for the 2023 UEFA European Under-17 Championship.
