= Leon Lalić =

Croatian footballer (born 2006)

Personal information
- Date of birth: 23 January 2006 (age 20)
- Place of birth: Austria
- Height: 1.85 m (6 ft 1 in)
- Position: Midfielder

Youth career
- 2014–2019: Austria Wien
- 2019–2023: Red Bull Salzburg

Senior career*
Years	Team	Apps	(Gls)
2023–2026	Lommel	18	(2)

International career^{‡}
2021–2022	Austria U16	10	(0)
2022	Austria U17	2	(0)
2023	Croatia U17	5	(0)
2024	Croatia U18	6	(1)
- * Club domestic league appearances and goals as of 29 August 2026 ‡ National team caps and goals as of 06:08, 12 March 2025 (UTC)

Leon Lalić (born 23 January 2006) is a footballer who plays as a midfielder. Born in Austria, he is a Croatia youth international.

== Early life ==
Lalić grew up in Vienna, Austria.

== Club career ==
As a youth player, Lalić joined the youth academy of Austrian side FK Austria Wien. After that, he joined the youth academy of Austrian side Red Bull Salzburg at the age of thirteen. He was described as "one of the Red Bulls' greatest talents... an integral part of the academy's oldest youth team". In 2023, he signed for Belgian side Lommel.

On 3 September 2026, his contract with Lommel was mutually terminated, a year and a half after his last appearance for Lommel's senior squad.

== International career ==
Lalić has represented Croatia internationally at youth level amid interest from the Austria youth national teams. He played at the 2023 UEFA European Under-17 Championship.

== Style of play ==
Lalić mainly operates as a midfielder. He has been described as "left-footed, he started as a left winger, played in almost all positions in the midfield, currently most often plays "ten" in Salzburg, and his father says that he sees him as a stopper, because he is calm, technically sound and reads the game very well".

== Personal life ==
Lalić is the cousin of Austrian footballer Karlo Lalic. He is the son of Croatian footballer Slaven Lalic.
