= Mathis Lambourde =

French footballer (born 2006)

Personal information
- Full name: Mathis Thierry Lambourde Frontier
- Date of birth: 9 January 2006 (age 20)
- Place of birth: Les Lilas, France
- Height: 1.79 m (5 ft 10 in)
- Position: Forward

Team information
- Current team: Servette
- Number: 22

Youth career
- 2013–2014: Cosmos Saint-Denis
- 2014–2017: Les Lilas
- 2017–2018: Paris Saint-Germain
- 2018–2021: Drancy
- 2021–2024: Rennes

Senior career*
Years	Team	Apps	(Gls)
2023–2024	Rennes B	16	(3)
2023–2024	Rennes	1	(0)
2024–2026	Hellas Verona	7	(1)
2025–2026	→ Reggiana (loan)	24	(4)
2026–	Servette	7	(2)

International career^{‡}
2022–2023	France U17	16	(9)
2023	France U18	12	(3)
Medal record
Men's football
Representing France
FIFA U-17 World Cup
Runner-up	2023 Indonesia
UEFA European Under-17 Championship
Runner-up	2023 Hungary
- * Club domestic league appearances and goals as of 28 September 2026 ‡ National team caps and goals as of 1 December 2023

Mathis Thierry Lambourde Frontier (born 9 January 2006) is a French professional footballer who plays as a forward for Swiss Super League club Servette.

== Club career ==
Born in Les Lilas, of Guadeloupean and Malagasy descent, Lambourde began his career at the age of seven with grassroots side Cosmos Saint-Denis. After one season, he joined hometown club Les Lilas, where he spent three years before a move to professional club Paris Saint-Germain. After only a season with Paris Saint-Germain, he moved to Jeanne d'Arc de Drancy in 2018, but the club would report that he had signed a six-year deal with Stade Rennais only a year later, in April 2019.

Despite being pictured in club attire holding a Stade Rennais kit, the French Football Federation have stated that it was not until 2021 that Lambourde would join the club. He got off to a good start to the 2022–23 season, scoring fourteen goals by November, and went on to finish the season with twenty-five in all competitions at under-19 level.

On 30 August 2024, Lambourde signed a five-year contract with Hellas Verona in Italy. On 1 September 2025, he was loaned to Reggiana in Serie B.

On 29 June 2026, he signed for Swiss Super League club Servette, leaving Italy and Hellas Verona after two and a half years.

== International career ==
Lambourde has represented France at under-17 level. He starred at the 2023 UEFA European Under-17 Championship as France finished runners-up to Germany.

== Legal affairs ==
On 18 June 2024, while riding an electric scooter on the pedestrian section of the François-Mitterrand mail in Rennes, Lambourde collided with a pedestrian, who was a 51-year-old woman. She died as a result of this accident six days later. On 4 July 2024, Lambourde was placed under judicial supervision and prosecuted for involuntary manslaughter, lack of insurance and "manifestly deliberate violation of an obligation of safety or prudence". The trial was held at the Rennes Criminal Court on 23 August 2024, in which Lambourde was handed a two-year suspended prison sentence for involuntary manslaughter.

== Honours ==
France U17

- UEFA European Under-17 Championship runner-up: 2023
- FIFA U-17 World Cup runner-up: 2023
