= Ike Orazi =

Irish association footballer (born 2007)

Personal information
- Full name: Ikechukwu Orazi
- Date of birth: 11 June 2007 (age 19)
- Place of birth: Dublin, Ireland
- Height: 1.76 m (5 ft 9 in)
- Position: Forward

Team information
- Current team: Reims
- Number: 73

Youth career
- 2013–2016: Corduff FC
- 2016–2019: Bolton Wanderers
- 2019–2023: Shamrock Rovers

Senior career*
Years	Team	Apps	(Gls)
2023–	Reims B	22	(2)
2024–	Reims	1	(0)

International career^{‡}
2022–2023	Republic of Ireland U16	4	(2)
2022–2023	Republic of Ireland U17	17	(2)
2024–	Republic of Ireland U19	9	(0)
- * Club domestic league appearances and goals as of 2 December 2025 ‡ National team caps and goals as of 20:05, 12 October 2025 (UTC)

Ikechukwu Orazi (born 11 June 2007) is an Irish professional footballer who plays as a forward for French Ligue 2 club Reims. He is a Republic of Ireland youth international.

== Early life ==
He started playing football in Avondale, Mulhuddart, in the north-west of Dublin, with his older brothers. He joined up with join local club Corduff from the age of six or seven years-old. After his family moved to Manchester, England he joined a local team before being spotted by the Bolton Wanderers Academy where he played for 3 years before moving back to Blanchardstown in Ireland by the time he was 12 years-old. He won a league and cup double with Shamrock Rovers’ under-15s team and he earned a first call up to Ireland at Under-15s level.

== Club career ==
He played at Corduff FC prior to joining up with Shamrock Rovers with whom he won the National League and Cup double at under-15 level. He was one of three players to be nominated by the FAI for their U17 International Player of the Year Award in 2023. He was also part of the Shamrock Rovers Academy Education Programme prior to joining Stade de Reims in September 2023.

He began to be included in the Stade de Reims first-team squads for Ligue 1 matches during the 2023–24 season. He made his debut in the Coupe de France against AS Mutzig on 22 December 2024. He made his senior league debut for the club as a late second-half substitute for Mamadou Diakhon, against Olympique Lyonnais on 9 February 2025 in a 4–0 defeat in Ligue 1.

== International career ==
Born in the Republic of Ireland, Orazi is of Nigerian descent. He is a youth international for the Republic of Ireland, featuring at the 2023 UEFA European Under-17 Championship in Budapest, Hungary. His performances included a goal in a 3–0 win over Wales U17.

In September 2024, he was called up for the Republic of Ireland U19 team. He featured for the Ireland U19 team in a 0–0 against Moldova U19 on 13 November 2024, in Nisporeni.

In September 2026, he received his first call-up to the Republic of Ireland U21 squad.

== Honours ==
Reims

- Coupe de France runner-up: 2024–25
