= Óscar Mesa =

Spanish footballer (born 2006)

Personal information
- Full name: Óscar Mesa Pérez
- Date of birth: 3 July 2006 (age 20)
- Place of birth: Santa Cruz de Tenerife, Spain
- Height: 1.78 m (5 ft 10 in)
- Position: Defender

Team information
- Current team: Real Madrid C
- Number: 17

Youth career
- 2015–2016: Atlético Barranco Hondo
- 2016–2021: Tenerife
- 2021–2022: Alavés
- 2022–: Real Madrid

Senior career*
Years	Team	Apps	(Gls)
2024–	Real Madrid C	19	(0)

International career^{‡}
2023	Spain U17	10	(2)
2023–2024	Spain U18	6	(0)
2024	Spain U19	3	(0)
- * Club domestic league appearances and goals as of 7 May 2026 ‡ National team caps and goals as of 02:49, 16 October 2024 (UTC)

Óscar Mesa Pérez (born 3 July 2006) is a Spanish footballer who plays as a defender for Real Madrid C.

== Early life ==
Mesa was born on 3 July 2006 in Santa Cruz de Tenerife, Spain. The son of Fernando Mesa and Elena Mesa, he is a native of La Guancha, Spain.

== Club career ==
As a youth player, Mesa joined the youth academy of Spanish side Atlético Barranco Hondo. In 2016, he joined the youth academy of Spanish side Tenerife. In 2021, he joined the youth academy of Spanish side Alavés. In 2022, he joined the youth academy of Spanish La Liga side Real Madrid and was promoted to the club's C team in 2024.

== International career ==
Mesa represented Spain internationally at youth level. He played for the Spain national under-17 football team at the 2023 UEFA European Under-17 Championship and the 2023 FIFA U-17 World Cup. In 2024, he began playing for the Spain national under-19 football team.

== Style of play ==
Mesa plays as a defender. Left-footed, he known for his speed, set-piece taking ability, and dribbling ability.
