= Andrej Petrović =

Serbian footballer (born 2006)

Personal information
- Date of birth: 24 April 2006 (age 20)
- Place of birth: Kraljevo, Serbia and Montenegro
- Height: 1.74 m (5 ft 9 in)
- Position: Midfielder

Team information
- Current team: TSC
- Number: 80

Youth career
- Red Star Belgrade

Senior career*
Years	Team	Apps	(Gls)
2023–2024	Red Star Belgrade	0	(0)
2023	→ Grafičar (loan)	4	(2)
2024–	TSC	17	(1)

International career^{‡}
2022	Serbia U16	3	(1)
2022–	Serbia U17	11	(3)
2023–	Serbia U19	2	(0)
- * Club domestic league appearances and goals as of 13 June 2026 ‡ National team caps and goals as of 15 November 2023

Andrej Petrović (Serbian Cyrillic: Андреј Петровић; born 24 April 2006) is a Serbian footballer currently playing as a midfielder for TSC.

== Club career ==
Having been loaned from Red Star Belgrade to Grafičar for the 2023–24 season, Petrović marked his debut in the Serbian First League with two goals in a 3–1 away win against Metalac.

== International career ==
Petrović captained Serbia at the 2023 UEFA European Under-17 Championship, scoring in Serbia's 4–2 opening loss to Slovenia.

== Career statistics ==
=== Club ===
As of 7 August 2023.

Appearances and goals by club, season and competition
Club	Season	League			Cup		Continental		Other		Total	
Club	Season	Division	Apps	Goals	Apps	Goals	Apps	Goals	Apps	Goals	Apps	Goals
Red Star Belgrade	2021–22	Serbian SuperLiga	0	0	0	0	0	0	0	0	0	0
Grafičar (loan)	2023–24	Serbian First League	1	2	0	0	–		0	0	1	2
Career total			1	2	0	0	0	0	0	0	1	2
