= Max Schmitt (footballer) =

German footballer (born 2006)

Personal information
- Full name: Max-Joseph Schmitt
- Date of birth: 18 January 2006 (age 20)
- Place of birth: Munich, Germany
- Height: 1.89 m (6 ft 2 in)
- Position: Goalkeeper

Team information
- Current team: Jahn Regensburg
- Number: 23

Youth career
- TSV Milbertshofen
- 2017–2024: Bayern Munich

Senior career*
Years	Team	Apps	(Gls)
2023–2026	Bayern Munich II	25	(0)
2023–2026	Bayern Munich	0	(0)
2025–2026	→ SSV Ulm (loan)	11	(0)
2026–	Jahn Regensburg	0	(0)
2026–	Jahn Regensburg II	1	(0)

International career^{‡}
2022–2023	Germany U17	20	(0)
2024	Germany U18	2	(0)
2024–2025	Germany U19	6	(0)
Medal record
Men's football
Representing Germany
FIFA U-17 World Cup
Winner	2023 Indonesia
UEFA European Under-17 Championship
Winner	2023 Hungary
- * Club domestic league appearances and goals as of 23:45, 18 August 2026 (UTC) ‡ National team caps and goals as of 23:45, 14 May 2025 (UTC)

Max-Joseph Schmitt (born 18 January 2006) is a German professional footballer who plays as a goalkeeper for 3. Liga club Jahn Regensburg. He is a German youth international.

== Early life ==
Schmitt grew up in Milbertshofen-Am Hart, Germany.

== Club career ==
=== Early career ===
Schmitt is a youth product of his childhood hometown club TSV Milbertshofen. He joined the youth academy of German Bundesliga side Bayern Munich at the age of eleven on 2017.

=== Bayern Munich ===
He received his first call-up with the Bayern Munich senior team for their first UEFA Champions League group stage match on 20 September 2023, against English Premier League club Manchester United. Schmitt was an unused substitute for the 4–3 home win.

On 22 September 2023, he made his professional debut for Bayern Munich II during a 3–2 win Regionalliga Bayern match over FV Illertissen.

Schmitt received his second call-up with the Bayern Munich senior team for a 4–0 away win DFB Pokal match against SC Preußen Münster on 26 September 2023, as an unused substitute.

He was called-up a third time with the Bayern Munich senior team for their first UEFA Champions League round of 16 match on 14 February 2024, against Italian Serie A club Lazio. However, Schmitt was an unused substitute again for the 1–0 away loss.

In the 2024–25 season, he was the third goalkeeper for most of the Champions League league phase, as well as two Bundesliga games, also not making a field appearance.

Schmitt was called-up with the Bayern Munich senior team for a friendly match on 6 January 2025, after the 2024 winter break concluded, in which he substituted Daniel Peretz at the 71st minute of a 6–0 win over Austrian Bundesliga club Red Bull Salzburg.

==== Loan to SSV Ulm ====
On 1 July 2025, he joined 3. Liga club SSV Ulm on loan for the 2025–26 season.

=== Jahn Regensburg ===
On 23 June 2026, Schmitt moved to 3. Liga club Jahn Regensburg permanently, ahead of the 2026–27 season.

== International career ==
Schmitt represented Germany internationally at youth level. He helped the Germany national under-17 football team win the 2023 UEFA European Under-17 Championship and the 2023 FIFA U-17 World Cup.

== Career statistics ==
=== Club ===
As of match played 26 September 2026

Appearances and goals by club, season and competition
Club	Season	League			National cup		Other		Total	
Club	Season	Division	Apps	Goals	Apps	Goals	Apps	Goals	Apps	Goals
Bayern Munich II	2023–24	Regionalliga Bayern	5	0	—		—		5	0
Bayern Munich II	2024–25	Regionalliga Bayern	20	0	—		—		20	0
Bayern Munich II	Total		25	0	—		—		25	0
Bayern Munich	2023–24	Bundesliga	0	0	0	0	0	0	0	0
Bayern Munich	2024–25	Bundesliga	0	0	0	0	0	0	0	0
Bayern Munich	Total		0	0	0	0	0	0	0	0
SSV Ulm (loan)	2025–26	3. Liga	11	0	0	0	3 (Note: Appearance in Württemberg Cup)	0	14	0
Jahn Regensburg	2026–27	3. Liga	0	0	—		0	0	0	0
Career total			36	0	0	0	3	0	39	0

== Style of play ==
Schmitt is known for his reflexes and ability to use his feet. He is also known for his leadership ability.

== Honours ==
Bayern Munich

- Bundesliga: 2024–25

International

Germany U17

- UEFA European Under-17 Championship: 2023
- FIFA U-17 World Cup: 2023

Individual

- UEFA European Under-17 Championship Team of the Tournament: 2023
