= Fodé Sylla (footballer) =

French footballer (born 2006)

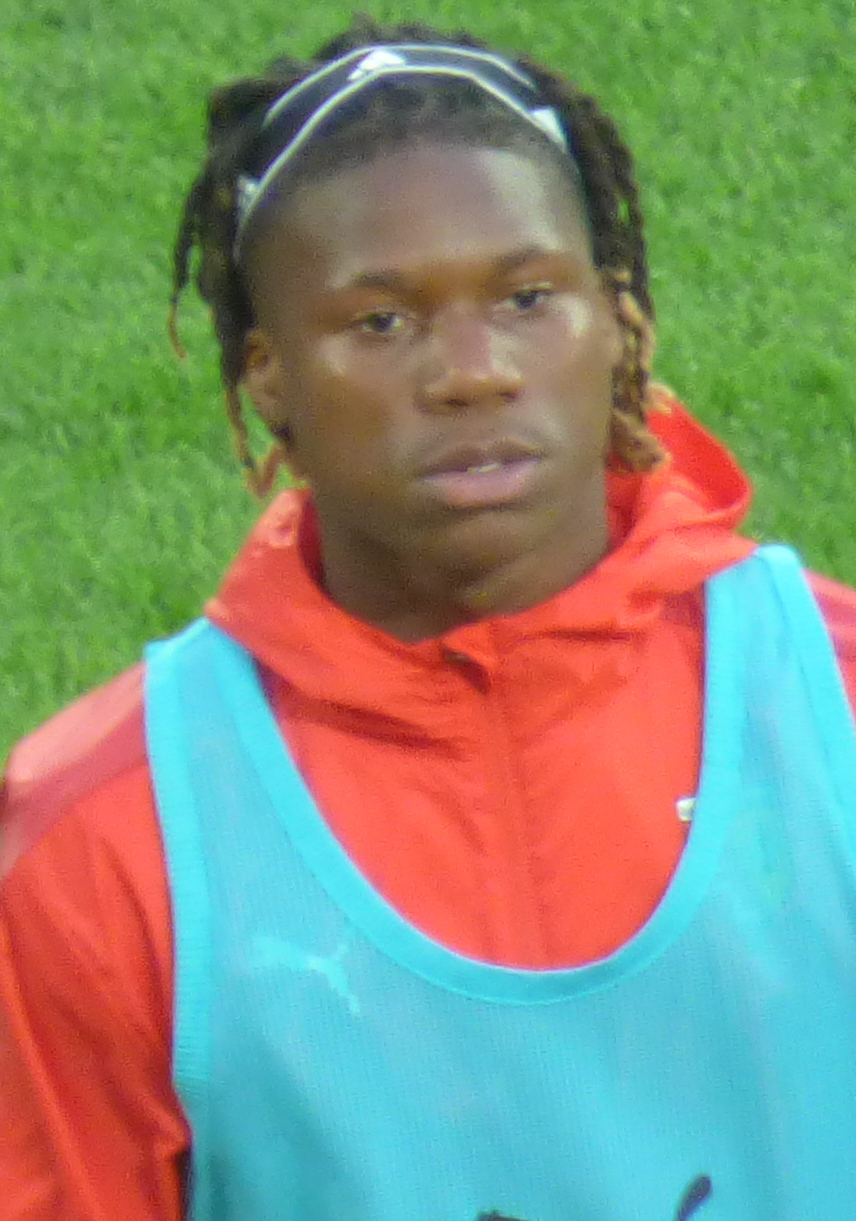
- Sylla in 2023

Personal information
- Full name: Fodé Sanassy Sylla
- Date of birth: 16 April 2006 (age 20)
- Place of birth: Saint-Quentin, France
- Height: 1.89 m (6 ft 2 in)
- Position: Defensive midfielder

Team information
- Current team: Sion
- Number: 37

Youth career
- 2013–2014: Roubaix Omnisports
- 2014–2023: Lens

Senior career*
Years	Team	Apps	(Gls)
2023–2025	Lens II	28	(2)
2024–2026	Lens	4	(0)
2024–2025	→ Yverdon (loan)	28	(1)
2026–	Sion	8	(1)

International career^{‡}
2021–2022	France U16	11	(0)
2022–2023	France U17	17	(1)
2023	France U18	11	(0)
2024–2025	France U19	11	(1)
2025–	France U20	7	(0)
- * Club domestic league appearances and goals as of 28 September 2026 ‡ National team caps and goals as of 23:30, 18 October 2025 (UTC)

Fodé Sanassy Sylla (born 16 April 2006) is a French professional football player who plays as a defensive midfielder for Swiss Super League club Sion.

== Club career ==
Sylla is a product of the youth academies of Roubaix Omnisports and Lens. On 14 June 2023, he signed his first professional contract with Lens until 2026. He joined Yverdon Sport FC on loan in the Swiss Super League for the 2024–25 season to gain experience. Returning to Lens after his loan, he extended his contract with the club on 13 August 2025 until 2028.

On 30 June 2026, Sylla returned to Switzerland and signed a five-year contract with Sion.

== International career ==
Born in France, Sylla is of Guinean descent. He played for the France U17s at the 2023 UEFA European Under-17 Championship and 2023 FIFA U-17 World Cup.

== Career statistics ==
=== Club ===
As of match played 8 May 2026

Appearances and goals by club, season and competition
Club	Season	League			National cup		Europe		Other		Total	
Club	Season	Division	Apps	Goals	Apps	Goals	Apps	Goals	Apps	Goals	Apps	Goals
Lens II	2022–23	National 3	8	0	—		—		—		8	0
Lens II	2023–24	National 3	20	2	—		—		—		20	2
Lens II	Total		28	2	—		—		—		28	2
Lens	2023–24	Ligue 1	0	0	0	0	0	0	—		0	0
Lens	2025–26	Ligue 1	4	0	1	0	—		—		5	0
Lens	Total		4	0	1	0	0	0	—		5	0
Yverdon (loan)	2024–25	Swiss Super League	28	1	1	0	—		—		29	1
Career total			60	3	2	0	0	0	0	0	62	3
