= Winsley Boteli =

Swiss footballer (born 2006)

Personal information
- Full name: Winsley Boteli Mokango
- Date of birth: 5 July 2006 (age 20)
- Place of birth: Geneva, Switzerland
- Height: 1.85 m (6 ft 1 in)
- Position: Striker

Team information
- Current team: Sion
- Number: 13

Youth career
- 2014–2022: Servette
- 2022–2024: Borussia Mönchengladbach

Senior career*
| Years | Team | Apps | (Gls) |
| 2024–2026 | Borussia Mönchengladbach II | 25 | (3) |
| 2025–2026 | → Sion (loan) | 34 | (8) |
| 2026– | Sion | 9 | (6) |

International career^{‡}
| 2022–2023 | Switzerland U17 | 15 | (8) |
| 2023–2024 | Switzerland U18 | 8 | (3) |
| 2024 | Switzerland U19 | 4 | (1) |
| 2025 | Switzerland U20 | 5 | (2) |
| 2025– | Switzerland U21 | 5 | (2) |
| 2026– | Switzerland | 4 | (1) |
- * Club domestic league appearances and goals as of 28 September 2026 ‡ National team caps and goals as of 16 November 2026

Winsley Boteli Mokango (born 5 July 2006) is a Swiss professional footballer who plays as a striker for Swiss Super League club Sion and the Switzerland national team.

== Club career ==
Boteli is a youth product of Servette, before moving to the academy of the German club Borussia Mönchengladbach on 1 July 2022. He was the top scorer in the 2023–24 Under 19 Bundesliga with 19 goals in 19 games. On 5 July 2024, he extended his contract with Borussia Mönchengladbach until 2028 and joined their reserves in the Regionalliga for the 2024–25 season.

On 25 June 2025, Boteli joined Swiss Super League club Sion on a year-long loan, with an option to buy.

== International career ==
Born in Switzerland, Boteli is of DR Congolese descent. He doesn't possess the DR Congo passport but has both the Swiss and the French ones. He was part of the Switzerland U17 squad for the 2023 UEFA European Under-17 Championship.

On 26 September 2026, Boteli made his debut for the Switzerland national team in a 2026–27 UEFA Nations League B game against North Macedonia.

== Career statistics ==
=== International ===
As of match played 16 November 2026

Appearances and goals by national team and year
| National team | Year | Apps | Goals |
|---|---|---|---|
| Switzerland | 2026 | 4 | 1 |
| Total | | 4 | 1 |

As of match played 16 November 2026

Scores and results list Switzerland's goal tally first, score column indicates score after each Boteli goal.

List of international goals scored by Winsley Boteli
| No. | Date | Venue | Cap | Opponent | Score | Result | Competition |
|---|---|---|---|---|---|---|---|
| 1 | 16 November 2026 | Sitterstadion, St.Gallen, Switzerland | 4 | Scotland | 2–0 | 4–0 | 2026–27 UEFA Nations League B |
