= Yanis Issoufou =

French footballer (born 2006)

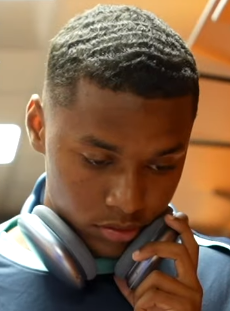
- Issoufou in 2024

Personal information
- Full name: Yanis Ali Issoufou
- Date of birth: 28 October 2006 (age 20)
- Place of birth: Nîmes, France
- Height: 1.82 m (6 ft 0 in)
- Position: Forward

Team information
- Current team: Millwall
- Number: 35

Youth career
- 2013–2014: AC Pissevin Valdegour
- 2014–2022: Nîmes
- 2022–2023: Montpellier

Senior career*
Years	Team	Apps	(Gls)
2023–2026	Montpellier II	22	(5)
2023–2026	Montpellier	25	(3)
2026–	Millwall	5	(0)

International career^{‡}
2022	Niger U17	4	(2)
2022–2023	France U17	14	(3)
2023	France U18	5	(1)
2024	France U19	2	(0)
Medal record
Men's football
Representing France
FIFA U-17 World Cup
Runner-up	2023 Indonesia
UEFA European Under-17 Championship
Runner-up	2023 Hungary
- * Club domestic league appearances and goals as of 5 September 2026 ‡ National team caps and goals as of 10 September 2024

Yanis Ali Issoufou (born 28 October 2006) is a French professional footballer who plays as a forward for EFL Championship side Millwall. He represented both Niger and France internationally as a junior.

== Club career ==
Issoufou is a youth product of AC Pissevin Valdegour and Nîmes, before moving to the youth academy of Montpellier on 2 June 2022. On 3 July 2023, he signed a professional contract with the club, extending his stay until 2026. He made his professional debut with Montpellier as a substitute in a 2–0 Ligue 1 loss to Nantes on 22 October 2023. At the age of 16 years and 359 days old, he was Montpellier's youngest ever debutant in the first division.

On 4 September 2026, Issoufou moved to English club Millwall.

== International career ==
Born in France, Issoufou holds both Nigerien and Moroccan nationalities. He played for the Niger U17s in 2022, scoring two goals during 2023 U-17 Africa Cup of Nations qualification. He switched to represent France, and played for the France U17s at the 2023 UEFA European Under-17 Championship. He played for the France U18s in 2023.

== Honours ==
U17 France

- UEFA European Under-17 Championship runner-up: 2023
- FIFA U-17 World Cup runner-up: 2023
