= Gabriele Biancheri =

Welsh footballer (born 2006)

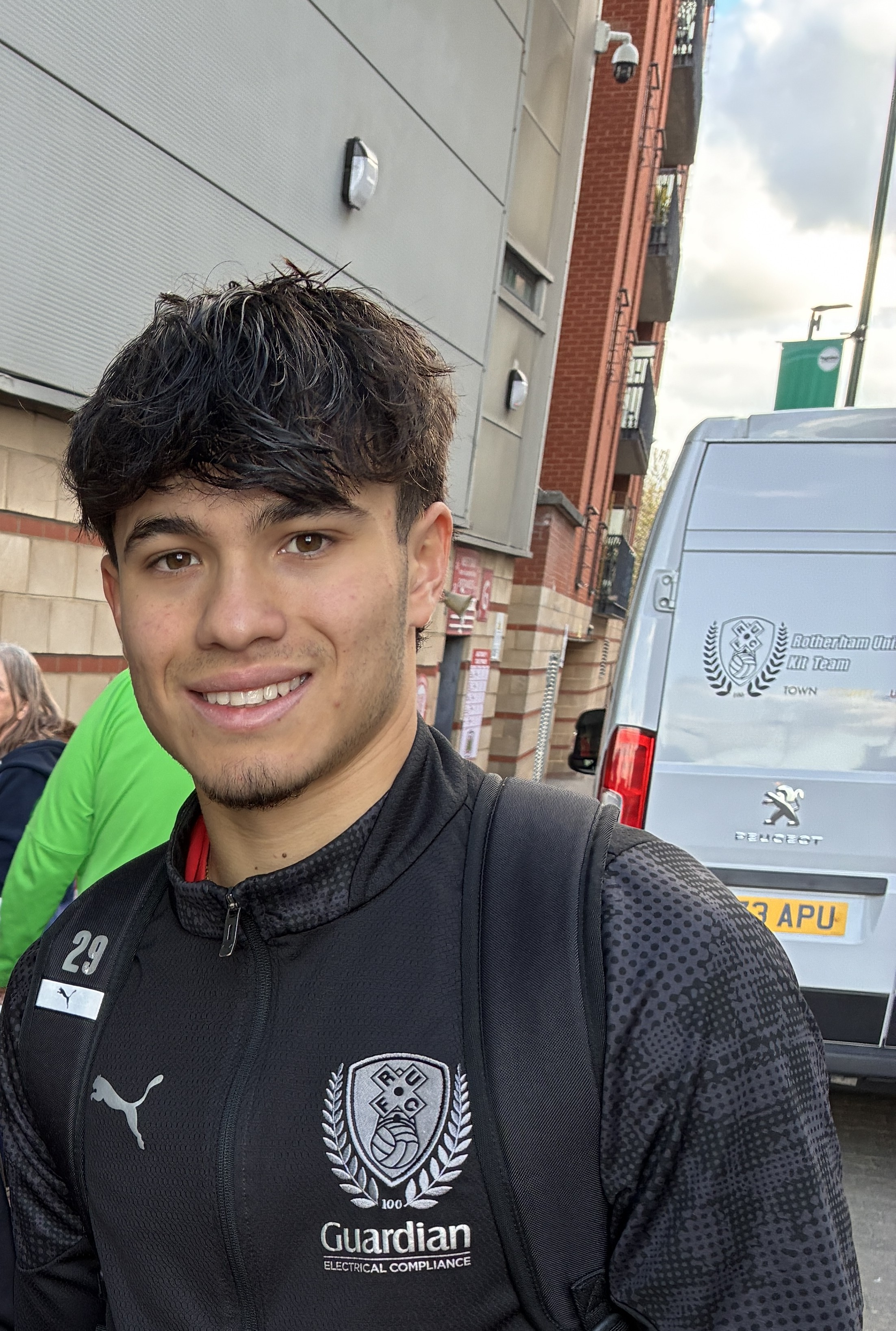
- Biancheri in 2026

Personal information
- Full name: Gabriele Cataldo Biancheri
- Date of birth: 18 September 2006 (age 20)
- Place of birth: Cardiff, Wales
- Height: 1.76 m (5 ft 9 in)
- Position: Forward

Team information
- Current team: FC Wacker Innsbruck
- Number: 20

Youth career
- 2013–2023: Cardiff City
- 2023–2026: Manchester United

Senior career*
Years	Team	Apps	(Gls)
2026	Manchester United	0	(0)
2026	→ Rotherham United (loan)	11	(0)
2026–	FC Wacker Innsbruck	1	(0)

International career^{‡}
2022	Wales U16	2	(1)
2022–2023	Wales U17	10	(2)
2023–2024	Wales U18	3	(1)
2024–	Wales U19	3	(5)
2025–	Wales U21	7	(2)
- * Club domestic league appearances and goals as of 21:20, 11 September 2026 (UTC) ‡ National team caps and goals as of 8 October 2026

Gabriele Cataldo Biancheri (born 18 September 2006) is a Welsh professional footballer who plays as a forward for 2. Liga club Wacker Innsbruck.

== Club career ==
=== Manchester United ===
Biancheri started his career in the academy of Cardiff City, where his prolific goal-scoring form earned him a call-up to the club's under-21 side, featuring in a 1–0 Premier League Cup home loss to Wolverhampton Wanderers on 3 December 2022. After over nine years with the Welsh club, Biancheri moved to Manchester United in February 2023.

==== Loan to Rotherham United ====
On 2 February 2026, Rotherham United announced he had joined on loan for the rest of the season.

=== FC Wacker Innsbruck ===
On 3 September 2026, Manchester United announced that Biancheri had moved to Austrian 2. Liga side FC Wacker Innsbruck on a permanent deal.

== International career ==
Born in Cardiff, Wales, Biancheri is of Italian and Canadian descent, and thus is able to represent Wales, Italy and Canada at the international level. He has represented Wales at under-16 and under-17 level.

He played for Wales at the 2023 UEFA European Under-17 Championship, scoring once against Poland as Wales were eliminated after the group stage. In March 2024 Biancheri was called up to the Wales under-19 squad for the first time, and scored his first goal against Belgium in a 1–0 away win on 25 March.

In May 2025, Biancheri was invited as a training player to Canada's senior team ahead of the 2025 Canadian Shield friendly tournament.

== Style of play ==
Described as a "pacy, sharp and dynamic forward", Biancheri is comfortable playing across the front three, while also capable of playing in the number 10 role.

== Career statistics ==
=== Club ===
As of match played 2 May 2026

Appearances and goals by club, season and competition
Club	Season	League			FA Cup		EFL Cup		Other		Total	
Club	Season	Division	Apps	Goals	Apps	Goals	Apps	Goals	Apps	Goals	Apps	Goals
Manchester United U21	2024–25	—			—		—		1 (Note: Appearance(s) in EFL Trophy)	0	1	0
Manchester United U21	2025–26	—			—		—		3	0	3	0
Manchester United U21	Total		—		—		—		4	0	4	0
Manchester United	2025–26	Premier League	0	0	0	0	0	0	—		0	0
Rotherham United	2025–26	League One	11	0	—		—		—		11	0
Career total			11	0	0	0	0	0	4	0	15	0
