= Mateusz Skoczylas =

Polish association football player

Personal information
- Full name: Mateusz Józef Skoczylas
- Date of birth: 20 September 2006 (age 20)
- Place of birth: Rzeszów, Poland
- Height: 1.81 m (5 ft 11 in)
- Position: Attacking midfielder

Team information
- Current team: Cracovia
- Number: 92

Youth career
- 2012–2017: Grunwald Budziwój Rzeszów
- 2017–2019: Stal Rzeszów
- 2019–2023: Zagłębie Lubin
- 2023–2025: AC Milan

Senior career*
Years	Team	Apps	(Gls)
2023	Zagłębie Lubin II	1	(0)
2025	Milan Futuro	0	(0)
2025–	Cracovia	0	(0)
2025–	Cracovia II	20	(2)

International career^{‡}
2019	Poland U14	1	(0)
2021–2022	Poland U16	9	(0)
2022–2023	Poland U17	19	(3)
2024	Poland U18	3	(0)
- * Club domestic league appearances and goals as of 10:47, 2 June 2026 (UTC) ‡ National team caps and goals as of 24 March 2024

Mateusz Józef Skoczylas (born 20 September 2006) is a Polish professional footballer who plays as an attacking midfielder for Ekstraklasa club Cracovia. He is a Poland youth international.

== Early life ==
From Rzeszów, in Subcarpathian Voivodeship, the middle child of three boys, Skoczylas and his brothers joined the Grunwald Budziwój Rzeszów football academy when he was six years-old. He stayed there for seven years and, after a short spell with Stal Rzeszów, as a 14-year-old he joined the academy at Zagłębie Lubin for the 2019–20 season.

== Club career ==
Skoczylas made his debut in the Polish II liga for Zagłębie Lubin II prior to his move in August 2023 to Italian Serie A club AC Milan, immediately joining the under-19 roster. The transfer fee paid by AC Milan was reported to be around €1 million.

In January 2024, he was found to be selling tickets for AC Milan games, which are given directly to players and their families, on Facebook groups.

On 1 July 2025, Skoczylas was promoted to the AC Milan's reserve team Milan Futuro, ahead of the 2025–26 season. However a couple months later, on 8 September 2025, he returned to his native Poland, and joined Ekstraklasa club Cracovia permanently.

== International career ==
He featured for Poland U17 side at the 2023 UEFA European Under-17 Championship in Hungary, scoring three goals as his side reached the semi-final. He was subsequently selected for the 2023 FIFA U-17 World Cup, held in Indonesia.
