= Mike Huras =

Polish footballer (born 2006)

Personal information
- Date of birth: 28 January 2006 (age 20)
- Place of birth: Stuttgart, Germany
- Height: 1.76 m (5 ft 9 in)
- Position: Striker

Team information
- Current team: 1. FC Normannia Gmünd

Youth career
- SV Hegnach
- FSV Waiblingen
- 2019–2024: VfB Stuttgart

Senior career*
Years	Team	Apps	(Gls)
2024	Ruch Chorzów	2	(0)
2025–2026	Sonnenhof Großaspach	21	(3)
2026–	1. FC Normannia Gmünd	0	(0)

International career^{‡}
2022–2023	Poland U17	21	(8)
2023–2024	Poland U18	5	(3)
- * Club domestic league appearances and goals as of 21:11, 1 June 2026 (UTC) ‡ National team caps and goals as of 2 July 2024

Mike Huras (born 28 January 2006) is a professional footballer who plays as a forward for Oberliga Baden-Württemberg club 1. FC Normannia Gmünd. Born in Germany, he is a Poland youth international.

== Early life ==
As a youth player, Huras joined the youth academy of German side VfB Stuttgart. He was regarded as one of the club's most important players.

== Club career ==
Huras started his senior career with Polish side Ruch Chorzów, having joined them on a two-and-a-half-year deal on 18 January 2024. On 10 March 2024, he debuted for the club during a 1–3 loss to Stal Mielec. After making no first team appearances at the start of the 2024–25 season, Huras requested for his contract to be terminated, and he left the club on 1 October 2024.

On 27 January 2025, Huras joined German fifth-tier club Sonnenhof Großaspach. He won back-to-back promotions with the club before leaving at the end of the 2025–26 season.

On 21 July 2026, Huras moved to another Oberliga side 1. FC Normannia Gmünd.

== International career ==
A youth international for Poland, he represented his parents' country of birth at the UEFA Under-17 Euro 2023 in Hungary and the 2023 FIFA U-17 World Cup in Indonesia.

== Personal life ==
Huras was born in 2006 in Stuttgart, Germany. He was born to parents from Silesian Voivodeship, Poland. He grew up supporting Ruch Chorzów, and is a member of their official fanclub in Germany.

== Honours ==
Sonnenhof Großaspach

- Regionalliga Südwest: 2025–26
- Oberliga Baden-Württemberg: 2024–25
