= Justin Oboavwoduo =

English association football player

Personal information
- Full name: Justin Oke Oboavwoduo Jr.
- Date of birth: 23 August 2006 (age 20)
- Place of birth: Manchester, England
- Height: 1.78 m (5 ft 10 in)
- Positions: Forward; winger; attacking midfielder

Team information
- Current team: Juventus
- Number: 45

Youth career
- 2014–2026: Manchester City
- 2026–: Juventus

Senior career*
Years	Team	Apps	(Gls)
2026–	Juventus Next Gen	11	(2)
2026–	Juventus	1	(0)

International career^{‡}
2021–2022	England U16	9	(1)
2022–2023	England U17	15	(4)
2023	England U18	5	(0)
2024	England U19	2	(0)
2025–	England U20	1	(0)
- * Club domestic league appearances and goals as of 13 September 2026 ‡ National team caps and goals as of 13:40, 9 October 2025 (UTC)

Justin Oke Oboavwoduo (born 23 August 2006) is an English professional footballer who plays as a forward, winger and attacking midfielder for Serie A club Juventus. He is an England youth international.

== Club career ==
Oboavwoduo came through the academy at Manchester City having joined the club at eight years old. He was part of the Man City side which won the U-18 Premier League national title in May 2023, scoring two goals in the final against West Ham U18s and finishing as the competition's top scorer with 18 goals. Oboavwoduo was included in the Manchester City squad that travelled to Saudi Arabia to play in the 2023 FIFA Club World Cup. In May 2024, he played in the final as Man City beat Leeds United U18s to win the FA Youth Cup.

On 2 February 2026, Oboavwoduo signed a two-and-a-half-year contract with Italian club Juventus and was assigned to their reserve team Juventus Next Gen in the third-tier Serie C. He made his debut in Serie A for Juventus on 13 September 2026, against Sassuolo as a second-half substitute for Kerim Alajbegović.

== International career ==
An England youth international, Oboavwoduo was a member of the England under-17 side that finished fifth at the 2023 UEFA European Under-17 Championship. He also featured at the 2023 FIFA U-17 World Cup and scored two goals in their opening group game against New Caledonia.

Oboavwoduo was added to England's 2025 UEFA European Under-19 Championship squad as a late injury replacement for Chris Rigg and made his U19 debut as a substitute during a 5–5 draw with Germany on 17 June 2025.

On 5 September 2025, Oboavwoduo made his U20 debut as a substitute during a 2–1 defeat to Italy at the SMH Group Stadium.

== Style of play ==
As well as playing as a striker, Oboavwoduo is capable of playing as an attacking midfielder or winger.

== Honours ==
Manchester City

- FIFA Club World Cup: 2023

== Personal life ==
Oboavwoduo has Nigerian heritage.
