= Naj Razi =

Irish association football player (born 2006)

Personal information
- Full name: Najemedine Razi
- Date of birth: 28 October 2006 (age 20)
- Place of birth: Tallaght, Ireland
- Height: 1.75 m (5 ft 9 in)
- Position: Midfielder

Team information
- Current team: Shamrock Rovers
- Number: 28

Youth career
- 2011–2023: Shamrock Rovers

Senior career*
Years	Team	Apps	(Gls)
2023–2024	Shamrock Rovers	3	(0)
2024–2025	Como	0	(0)
2026–	Shamrock Rovers	11	(0)

International career^{‡}
2022–2023	Republic of Ireland U17	10	(3)
2023–2025	Republic of Ireland U19	16	(2)
2026–	Republic of Ireland U21	1	(0)
- * Club domestic league appearances and goals as of 19:08, 21 October 2026 ‡ National team caps and goals as of 22:15, 9 June 2026 (UTC)

Najemedine Razi (born 28 October 2006) is an Irish professional footballer who plays as a midfielder for League of Ireland Premier Division club Shamrock Rovers. He is a Republic of Ireland youth international.

== Early life ==
Born and raised in Tallaght, County Dublin, Ireland, Razi is of Algerian descent. He studied for his Leaving Cert at Ashfield College.

== Club career ==
=== Shamrock Rovers ===
Razi made his Shamrock Rovers first team debut on 23 July 2023 against Dundalk in the FAI Cup. In the following fixture he made his debut in the UEFA Conference League appearing as a substitute against Hungarian side Ferencvaros on 27 July. On 22 September 2023, he made his League of Ireland debut against UCD. The following month Rovers were confirmed as league champions. On 30 October 2023, he made his first league start for Rovers against Cork City.

=== Como ===
On 1 February 2024, Razi joined Serie B club Como on a contract until the summer of 2026, for an initial fee believed to be in the region of €450,000. Razi had offers to train with both Arsenal and Chelsea before Como completed the deal before the Italian transfer window closed. On 1 September 2025, Razi's contract with the club was terminated by mutual consent.

=== Return to Shamrock Rovers ===
On 7 February 2026, it was announced that Razi had signed back at his first senior club, Shamrock Rovers. On 17 July 2026, he scored the first goal of his senior career, finding the top corner from 25 yards to open the scoring in a 4–1 victory over Cork City in the FAI Cup. On 4 August 2026, Razi suffered a broken jaw during a 3–1 win over Egnatia in the UEFA Europa League, with the recovery period set to keep him out of action for several weeks.

== Style of play ==
A forward, he is said to be able to operate from either wing. He has also played as a number 10.

== International career ==
Razi scored his first goal for the Republic of Ireland U17 side against Armenia U17 in October 2022. In February 2023, he scored the only goal in a 1–0 win over Hungary U17.

He played for the Irish U17 team at the 2023 UEFA European Under-17 Championship. He scored as Ireland beat Wales U17 and helped the Irish side reach the quarter-finals. Razi was named the FAI's U-17 player of the year in June 2023 at the FAI International Football Awards.

== Career statistics ==
As of match played 12 October 2026

Appearances and goals by club, season and competition
Club	Season	League			National cup (Note: Includes FAI Cup & Coppa Italia)		Europe		Other		Total	
Club	Season	Division	Apps	Goals	Apps	Goals	Apps	Goals	Apps	Goals	Apps	Goals
Shamrock Rovers	2023	LOI Premier Division	3	0	1	0	2 (Note: Appearance(s) in the UEFA Europa Conference League)	0	0	0	6	0
Como	2023–24	Serie B	0	0	–		–		–		0	0
Como	2024–25	Serie A	0	0	0	0	–		–		0	0
Como	2025–26	Serie A	0	0	0	0	–		–		0	0
Como	Total		0	0	0	0	–		–		0	0
Shamrock Rovers	2026	LOI Premier Division	11	0	1	1	4 (Note: 3 appearances in the UEFA Champions League; 1 appearance in the UEFA Europa League)	0	2 (Note: Appearance in the Leinster Senior Cup)	0	18	1
Career total			14	0	2	1	6	0	2	0	24	1
