= Ljubo Puljić =

Croatian footballer (born 2007)

Personal information
- Date of birth: 31 May 2007 (age 19)
- Place of birth: Vinkovci, Croatia
- Height: 1.94 m (6 ft 4 in)
- Position: Centre-back

Team information
- Current team: Atalanta U23
- Number: 43

Youth career
- Cibalia
- 2018–2023: Osijek
- 2023–2025: Bayern Munich

Senior career*
Years	Team	Apps	(Gls)
2025–2026	Bayern Munich II	16	(0)
2026–	Atalanta U23	7	(0)

International career^{‡}
2022–2024	Croatia U17	16	(2)
2024–	Croatia U19	21	(3)
- * Club domestic league appearances and goals as of 7 November 2026 ‡ National team caps and goals as of 23:45, 8 July 2026 (UTC)

Ljubo Puljić (born 31 May 2007) is a Croatian professional footballer who plays as a centre-back for Serie C Group C club Atalanta Under-23, the reserve team of Serie A club Atalanta. He is a Croatian youth international.

== Early life ==
He is a native of Vinkovci, Croatia.

== Club career ==
=== Bayern Munich ===
Puljić went from the youth academy of his hometown club Cibalia to the Osijek youth academy, then he signed for the Bayern Munich youth academy on 31 May 2023, coinciding with his 16th birthday, for a transfer fee that could reportedly rise up to €2,800,000. Becoming a record fee for a Croatian of his age. He was originally assigned with the Bayern Munich U17s at the start of the 2023–24 season and made four appearances before he went on to feature for the U19 side, as well as starting to train with the senior team, all at only the age of 16 years-old. In January 2024, he accompanied the senior team on their mid-season training block in Faro, Portugal.

The following season, he made his professional debut with Bayern Munich II, starting for a 2–1 away loss Regionalliga Bayern match against TSV Aubstadt on 23 April 2025.

In early 2026, Serie A club AC Milan showed interest in recruiting him.

=== Atalanta ===
In June 2026, AC Milan was beaten in the pursuit of recruiting Puljić, as fellow Italian side Atalanta agreed with the player to sign him earlier, ahead of the 2026–27 season. His signing was officially announced on June 15, he is set to initially join Atalanta's reserve team in the Serie C.

== International career ==
As a Croatia U17 international, he scored the Croatian goal in a match against Netherlands U17 that finished 1–1 at the 2023 UEFA European Under-17 Championship in Hungary in May 2023.

He made his debut for the Croatia national under-19 football team against England U19 in a home 1–1 draw on 7 September 2024, in Koprivnica.

== Career statistics ==
As of match played 16 May 2026

Appearances and goals by club, season and competition
Club	Season	League			Cup		Total	
Club	Season	Division	Apps	Goals	Apps	Goals	Apps	Goals
Bayern Munich II	2024–25	Regionalliga Bayern	1	0	—		1	0
Bayern Munich II	2025–26	Regionalliga Bayern	15	0	—		15	0
Bayern Munich II	Total		16	0	—		16	0
Career Total			16	0	0	0	16	0

== Style of play ==
He mainly operates as a centre-back. Puljić is left-footed and is known for his physicality and athleticism.
