= Andrej Subotić =

Bosnian-Serbian footballer (born 2006)

Personal information
- Date of birth: 30 August 2006 (age 20)
- Place of birth: Gradiška, Bosnia and Herzegovina
- Height: 1.78 m (5 ft 10 in)
- Position: Midfielder

Team information
- Current team: Crown Legacy FC
- Number: 60

Youth career
- –2021: FK Kozara Gradiška
- 2021–2024: FK Čukarički

Senior career*
Years	Team	Apps	(Gls)
2024	FK Čukarički	4	(0)
2025–	Crown Legacy FC	23	(6)

International career^{‡}
2021	Bosnia and Herzegovina U15	8	(0)
2021–2022	Serbia U16	7	(1)
2022–2023	Serbia U17	13	(2)
2023	Serbia U18	1	(0)
2024	Serbia U19	8	(1)
- * Club domestic league appearances and goals as of 26 September 2025 ‡ National team caps and goals as of 19 November 2024

Andrej Subotić (Serbian Cyrillic: Андреј Суботић; born 30 August 2006) is a Serbian professional footballer who plays as a midfielder for Crown Legacy FC. Born in Bosnia and Herzegovina, he is a Bosnia and Herzegovina and Serbia youth international.

== Early life ==
Subotić was born on 30 August 2006 in Gradiška, Bosnia and Herzegovina and is a native of the city. The son of Goranka and Mirko, he has a brother.

Growing up, he attended the Fifteenth Belgrade Gymnasium in Serbia and regarded Portugal international Cristiano Ronaldo as his football idol.

== Club career ==
As a youth player, Subotić joined the youth academy of Bosnia and Herzegovina side FK Kozara Gradiška. Following his stint there, he joined the youth academy of Serbian side FK Čukarički in 2021 and was promoted to the club's senior team in 2024, where he made four league appearances and scored zero goals. Ahead of the 2025 season, he signed for American side Crown Legacy FC.

== International career ==
Subotić is a Bosnia and Herzegovina and Serbia youth international. During May 2023, he played for the Serbia national under-17 football team at the 2023 UEFA European Under-17 Championship.
