= Noah Darvich =

German footballer (born 2006)

Personal information
- Full name: Noah Yanis Darvich
- Date of birth: 25 September 2006 (age 20)
- Place of birth: Freiburg im Breisgau, Germany
- Height: 1.84 m (6 ft 0 in)
- Position: Attacking midfielder

Team information
- Current team: SV Elversberg (on loan from VfB Stuttgart)
- Number: 10

Youth career
- 2015–2017: Eintracht Freiburg
- 2017–2023: SC Freiburg

Senior career*
Years	Team	Apps	(Gls)
2023–2025	Barcelona B	47	(1)
2025–2026	VfB Stuttgart II	29	(10)
2026–	VfB Stuttgart	0	(0)
2026–	→ SV Elversberg (loan)	5	(0)

International career^{‡}
2021–2022	Germany U16	4	(1)
2022–2023	Germany U17	23	(7)
2024	Germany U18	3	(1)
2024–2025	Germany U19	11	(4)
2025–	Germany U20	2	(2)
2026–	Germany U21	3	(0)
Medal record
Men's football
Representing Germany
FIFA U-17 World Cup
Winner	2023 Indonesia
UEFA European Under-17 Championship
Winner	2023 Hungary
- * Club domestic league appearances and goals as of 17 October 2026 ‡ National team caps and goals as of 6 October 2026

Noah Yanis Darvich (born 25 September 2006) is a German professional footballer who plays as an attacking midfielder for Bundesliga club SV Elversberg, on loan from VfB Stuttgart.

== Club career ==
=== SC Freiburg ===
Darvich went through the SC Freiburg youth academy. By the 2022–23 season he had become a regular goal and assist provider for the under-17 Freiburg team, making the step to the under-19, whilst appearing as one of the most sought after German player of his generation, despite being only 16.

=== Barcelona Atlètic ===
On 8 August 2023, Darvich signed for Barcelona Atlètic. He joined FC Barcelona Atlètic from Bundesliga club SC Freiburg in a deal worth €5 million. On 11 October 2023, he was named by English newspaper The Guardian as one of the best players born in 2006 worldwide.

=== VfB Stuttgart ===
On 1 July 2025, Darvich joined VfB Stuttgart and signed a four-year-contract.

==== Loan to SV Elversberg ====
On 25 June 2026, Darvich moved to SV Elversberg, freshly promoted to Bundesliga, on a season-long loan.

== International career ==
Born in Germany to an Iraqi father and a French mother, Darvich is eligible to represent Germany, Iraq, and France internationally. He is a youth international for Germany, becoming a regular with the under-17 by 2022–23.

In May 2023, he was selected by Christian Wück for the European Championship as Germany under-17's captain.

He was among the standouts of the competition, proving to be decisive on several occasions, as Germany topped a pool including Portugal and title-holders France. With two assists, Darvich was later instrumental in his team 5–3 beating of Poland to reach the final of the tournament, the younger midfielder having made a total of four assists and two goals in five games.

== Style of play ==
Darvich has technical skill, with attributes such as quick speed, dribbling and passing. Primarily an attacking midfielder, he is also able to play in a deeper role or further forward on the wing.

From the very early stage of his career he has been hailed for his physical qualities and tactical adaptability. It has been suggested Darvich has a large release clause inserted into his contract.

== Career statistics ==
As of match played 17 October 2026

Appearances and goals by club, season and competition
Club	Season	League			Cup		Europe		Other		Total	
Club	Season	Division	Apps	Goals	Apps	Goals	Apps	Goals	Apps	Goals	Apps	Goals
Barcelona B	2023–24	Primera Federación	21	1	—		—		—		21	1
Barcelona B	2024–25	Primera Federación	26	0	—		—		—		26	0
Barcelona B	Total		47	1	0	0	0	0	0	0	47	1
VfB Stuttgart II	2025–26	3. Liga	29	10	—		—		—		29	10
VfB Stuttgart	2026–27	Bundesliga	0	0	0	0	0	0	—		0	0
SV Elversberg (loan)	2026–27	Bundesliga	5	0	1	0	—		—		6	0
Career total			81	11	1	0	0	0	0	0	82	11

== Honours ==
Germany U17

- UEFA European Under-17 Championship: 2023
- FIFA U-17 World Cup: 2023

Individual

- UEFA European Under-17 Championship Team of the Tournament: 2023
- Fritz Walter Medal U17 Silver: 2023
