= Rhodri Smith (footballer) =

Swiss footballer (born 2006)

Personal information
- Date of birth: 9 September 2006 (age 20)
- Height: 1.85 m (6 ft 1 in)
- Position: Left-back

Team information
- Current team: Baník Ostrava (on loan from Young Boys)

Youth career
- 2015–2018: Muri-Gümligen
- 2018–2024: Young Boys

Senior career*
| Years | Team | Apps | (Gls) |
| 2024–2025 | Young Boys II | 41 | (0) |
| 2024– | Young Boys | 5 | (0) |
| 2026 | → Winterthur (loan) | 13 | (0) |
| 2026– | → Baník Ostrava (loan) | 0 | (0) |

International career
| 2023 | Switzerland U17 | 9 | (0) |
| 2023–2024 | Switzerland U18 | 5 | (0) |
| 2024 | Switzerland U19 | 4 | (0) |
- * Club domestic league appearances and goals as of 26 May 2026

Rhodri Smith (born 9 September 2006) is a Swiss professional footballer who plays as a left-back for Czech First League club Baník Ostrava on loan from Young Boys.

== Club career ==
Smith started his football career with Muri-Gümligen. After coming through the Young Boys academy and featuring for the club's second team in the Promotion League, Smith made his senior debut on 6 November 2024 as a substitute in a 2–1 loss to Shakhtar Donetsk in the Champions League. On 10 April 2025, he signed a new five-year contract with the club until summer 2030. On 22 November 2025, he made his Swiss Super League debut for the club, appearing as a late substitute in a 5–0 win over Winterthur. On 3 February 2026, Smith joined Winterthur on loan until the end of the season. On 8 September 2026, Smith joined Czech First League club Baník Ostrava on loan until the end of the season.

== International career ==
Smith has represented Switzerland a numerous youth international levels. On 19 March 2026, he received his first call-up to the Switzerland U21 squad.

== Personal life ==
Smith spent the first six years of his life in England before moving to Switzerland.
