= Charles Herrmann =

German footballer (born 2006)

Personal information
- Full name: Charles Kwablan Herrmann
- Date of birth: 21 January 2006 (age 20)
- Place of birth: Hanover, Germany
- Height: 1.80 m (5 ft 11 in)
- Position: Winger

Team information
- Current team: Cercle Brugge
- Number: 11

Youth career
- –2020: Hannover 96
- 2020–2024: Borussia Dortmund

Senior career*
Years	Team	Apps	(Gls)
2024–2026	Borussia Mönchengladbach II	45	(3)
2025–2026	Borussia Mönchengladbach	1	(0)
2026–	Cercle Brugge	4	(0)

International career^{‡}
2021–2022	Germany U16	10	(1)
2023	Germany U17	19	(6)
2024–2025	Germany U19	9	(0)
2025–	Germany U20	2	(0)
Medal record
Men's football
Representing Germany
FIFA U-17 World Cup
Winner	2023 Indonesia
- * Club domestic league appearances and goals as of 11 May 2026 ‡ National team caps and goals as of 13 October 2025

Charles Kwablan Herrmann (born 21 January 2006) is a German professional footballer who plays as a winger for Belgian Pro League club Cercle Brugge.

== Club career ==
As a youth player, Herrmann joined the youth academy of Hannover 96. Following his stint there, he joined the youth academy of Bundesliga side Borussia Dortmund in 2020.

Ahead of the 2024–25 season, he signed for the reserve team of Bundesliga side Borussia Mönchengladbach and was promoted to the club's senior team in 2025. On 21 September 2025, he debuted with the club during a 1–1 away draw against Bayer Leverkusen in the league.

On 1 February 2026, Herrmann signed a three-and-a-half-year contract with Belgian club Cercle Brugge.

== International career ==
Herrmann is a Germany youth international. During November 2023, he played for the Germany national under-17 football team at the 2023 FIFA U-17 World Cup.

== Honours ==
International

Germany U17

- FIFA U-17 World Cup: 2023
