= Karol Borys =

Polish footballer (born 2006)

Personal information
- Full name: Karol Krzysztof Borys
- Date of birth: 28 September 2006 (age 20)
- Place of birth: Otmuchów, Poland
- Height: 1.74 m (5 ft 9 in)
- Position: Midfielder

Team information
- Current team: Śląsk Wrocław
- Number: 18

Youth career
- 2012–2013: Czarni Otmuchów
- 2013–2022: Śląsk Wrocław

Senior career*
Years	Team	Apps	(Gls)
2022–2023	Śląsk Wrocław II	13	(0)
2022–2024	Śląsk Wrocław	10	(0)
2024–2026	Westerlo	5	(0)
2024–2026	→ Maribor (loan)	25	(2)
2026–	Śląsk Wrocław	0	(0)
2026–	Śląsk Wrocław II	2	(1)

International career^{‡}
2021–2022	Poland U16	8	(5)
2022–2023	Poland U17	19	(3)
2023	Poland U18	5	(0)
2024	Poland U19	8	(1)
2025–	Poland U20	7	(0)
2024	Poland U21	1	(1)
- * Club domestic league appearances and goals as of 14:05, 10 November 2026 (UTC) ‡ National team caps and goals as of 21:30, 19 November 2026 (UTC)

Karol Krzysztof Borys (born 28 September 2006) is a Polish professional footballer who plays as a midfielder for Ekstraklasa club Śląsk Wrocław.

== Club career ==
Born in Otmuchów, Borys started his career with hometown club Czarni Otmuchów, before joining the Śląsk Wrocław academy in 2013. He signed his first professional contract there in October 2021, having previously attended a trial at Manchester United.

On 21 May 2022, Borys made his professional debut for Śląsk's first team, coming on as a substitute in the last 20 minutes of a 4–3 home loss to Górnik Zabrze during the last matchday of the 2021–22 season. By doing so, he became the first player born in 2006 to appear in Ekstraklasa and displaced Mirosław Pękala as the youngest player in the history of the Silesian club.

On 11 October 2023, Borys was named by English newspaper The Guardian as one of the best players born in 2006 worldwide. In December of the same year, he reportedly attracted interest from several European clubs, including Fiorentina and PSV Eindhoven.

On 1 February 2024, Belgian club Westerlo announced the signing of Borys on a two-and-a-half-year contract. He made his debut for De Kemphanen on 31 March that year, coming on as a second-half substitute in a 2–0 Europe play-off away loss against Sint-Truiden. After the 2023–24 season, in which Borys made four appearances for Westerlo, he joined Slovenian PrvaLiga club Maribor on a season-long loan with the option to make the transfer permanent. He played 20 games for the club in all competitions in the first half of the season, before his season was cut short due to a serious injury. His loan at Maribor was then extended for another year in July 2025.

On 9 September 2026, Borys returned to Śląsk Wrocław on a free transfer and a three-year contract.

== Career statistics ==
As of match played 29 October 2026

Appearances and goals by club, season and competition
Club	Season	League			National cup (Note: Includes Polish Cup, Slovenian Cup)		Continental		Total	
Club	Season	Division	Apps	Goals	Apps	Goals	Apps	Goals	Apps	Goals
Śląsk Wrocław II	2021–22	II liga	3	0	—		—		3	0
Śląsk Wrocław II	2022–23	II liga	7	0	0	0	—		7	0
Śląsk Wrocław II	2023–24	III liga, gr. III	3	0	0	0	—		3	0
Śląsk Wrocław II	Total		13	0	0	0	—		13	0
Śląsk Wrocław	2021–22	Ekstraklasa	1	0	—		—		1	0
Śląsk Wrocław	2022–23	Ekstraklasa	6	0	1	0	—		7	0
Śląsk Wrocław	2023–24	Ekstraklasa	3	0	0	0	—		3	0
Śląsk Wrocław	Total		10	0	1	0	—		11	0
Westerlo	2023–24	Belgian Pro League	4	0	—		—		4	0
Westerlo	2026–27	Belgian Pro League	1	0	—		—		1	0
Westerlo	Total		5	0	—		—		5	0
Maribor (loan)	2024–25	Slovenian PrvaLiga	14	0	2	0	4 (Note: Appearances in UEFA Conference League)	0	20	0
Maribor (loan)	2025–26	Slovenian PrvaLiga	11	2	2	0	1	0	14	2
Maribor (loan)	Total		25	2	4	0	5	0	34	2
Śląsk Wrocław	2026–27	Ekstraklasa	0	0	1	0	—		1	0
Śląsk Wrocław II	2026–27	II liga	2	1	0	0	—		2	1
Career total			55	3	6	0	5	0	66	3
