= Sergej Levak =

Croatian footballer (born 2006)

Personal information
- Date of birth: 3 May 2006 (age 20)
- Place of birth: Osijek, Croatia
- Height: 1.97 m (6 ft 6 in)
- Position: Central midfielder

Team information
- Current team: Atalanta U23
- Number: 47

Youth career
- –2023: Osijek
- 2023–2025: Roma

Senior career*
Years	Team	Apps	(Gls)
2025–	Atalanta U23	34	(8)
2026–	Atalanta	0	(0)

International career^{‡}
2021	Croatia U15	2	(0)
2022	Croatia U16	3	(0)
2022–2023	Croatia U17	7	(1)
2023–2024	Croatia U18	6	(0)
2024–	Croatia U19	1	(0)
- * Club domestic league appearances and goals as of 1 May 2026 ‡ National team caps and goals as of 7 September 2024

Sergej Levak (born 3 May 2006) is a Croatian professional footballer who plays as a central midfielder for Serie C Group C club Atalanta U23.

== Early life ==
Levak grew up in Osijek, Croatia.

== Club career ==
=== Roma ===
Levak has been described as " the first club he started playing for was Elektra from Osijek, from which he went to the Krpan&Babić Academy, and in 2019 he moved to Gradski vrt. He is one of the most talented players of his generation". After that, he joined the youth academy of Croatian side Osijek. In 2023, he joined the youth academy of Italian Serie A side Roma, and was regarded as one of the club's most important players. He trained with the first team of the club.

=== Atalanta ===
On July 29, 2025, Levak joined Serie A club Atalanta as a free agent. He was initially assigned to the reserve team, Atalanta U23.

== International career ==
Levak represented Croatia internationally at youth level.

== Style of play ==
Levak mainly operates as a midfielder. He has been described as "has high level technical skills but above all a physical structure with great potential... physical player in the middle of the pitch, like Matic, but also with a strong propensity for insertion". He has received comparisons to Spain international Rodri.

== Personal life ==
Levak has a brother.
