= Paris Brunner =

German footballer (born 2006)

Personal information
- Full name: Paris Josua Brunner
- Date of birth: 15 February 2006 (age 20)
- Place of birth: Dortmund, Germany
- Height: 1.85 m (6 ft 1 in)
- Position: Striker

Team information
- Current team: Monaco
- Number: 29

Youth career
- SG Lütgendortmund
- –2017: TSC Eintracht Dortmund
- 2017–2019: Rot-Weiss Essen
- 2019–2020: VfL Bochum
- 2020–2024: Borussia Dortmund

Senior career*
Years	Team	Apps	(Gls)
2024	Borussia Dortmund II	2	(0)
2024–	Monaco	12	(4)
2024–2025	→ Cercle Brugge (loan)	18	(3)

International career^{‡}
2021–2022	Germany U16	6	(1)
2022–2023	Germany U17	25	(20)
2024	Germany U18	3	(0)
2024–2025	Germany U19	15	(5)
2025	Germany U19	4	(8)
2026–	Germany U21	5	(2)
Medal record
Men's football
Representing Germany
FIFA U-17 World Cup
Winner	2023 Indonesia
UEFA European Under-17 Championship
Winner	2023 Hungary
- * Club domestic league appearances and goals as of 18 September 2026 ‡ National team caps and goals as of 20:35, 17 November 2026 (UTC)

Paris Josua Brunner (German pronunciation: [ˈpaːʁɪs ˈbʁʊnɐ]; born 15 February 2006) is a German professional footballer who plays as a striker for Ligue 1 club Monaco.

== Club career ==
Brunner played for the academies of Rot-Weiss Essen and VfL Bochum, before joining Borussia Dortmund's academy in 2020.

He rose to prominence in the footballing world after scoring sixteen goals in only five Under 17 Bundesliga appearances. He was promoted to the under-19 side at the age of sixteen, scoring on his debut against Bonner SC in the Under 19 Bundesliga. These goal-scoring feats earned him comparisons to teammate Youssoufa Moukoko, who was similarly prolific at youth level.

On 11 October 2023, he was named by English newspaper The Guardian as one of the best players born in 2006 worldwide. A week later, Borussia Dortmund indefinitely suspended Brunner for undisclosed disciplinary reasons.

On 16 August 2024, Brunner signed for Ligue 1 club Monaco, then immediately went on loan to Belgian Pro League club Cercle Brugge.

Brunner scored his first senior goal for Cercle Brugge on 19 December, matchday 6 of the UEFA Conference League, in a 1–1 draw against Başakşehir. The late equaliser helped his team qualify directly for the round of 16 by finishing eighth in the league phase. On 30 August 2026, he scored his first Ligue 1 goals, netting a brace in a 2–0 victory over Marseille.

After returning to Monaco, Brunner gradually gained a greater role in the first-team squad. During the preparations for the 2026–27 season, he finished as the team's leading goalscorer with five goals and subsequently scored his first goal in a European competition against Górnik Zabrze.

== International career ==
Brunner has represented Germany at youth international level. He is also eligible to represent the Democratic Republic of the Congo, through his mother.

=== Youth ===
During the 2023 UEFA European Under-17 Championship, he scored the equalizer for 10-man Germany team against Switzerland in the quarter-final match which ended in a 3–2 win on penalties, securing a place in the FIFA U-17 World Cup. He later managed to win the competition with his country after beating France in the final 4–3 on penalties. He was also voted player of the tournament, in addition to being the joint top scorer with four goals.

At the end of the same year, Brunner took part at the 2023 FIFA U-17 World Cup, representing Germany. Scoring five goals throughout the competition and becoming joint winner of the silver boot, Brunner and his team would win the final in which he scored, again against France and once again on penalties. He also would win the golden ball and become part of the team of the tournament.

== Career statistics ==
As of match played 22 October 2026

Appearances and goals by club, season and competition
Club	Season	League			National cup (Note: Includes Belgian Cup)		Europe		Other		Total	
Club	Season	Division	Apps	Goals	Apps	Goals	Apps	Goals	Apps	Goals	Apps	Goals
Borussia Dortmund II	2023–24	3. Liga	2	0	—		—		—		2	0
Monaco	2024–25	Ligue 1	0	0	0	0	0	0	0	0	0	0
Monaco	2025–26	Ligue 1	7	0	0	0	0	0	—		7	0
Monaco	2026–27	Ligue 1	5	4	0	0	4 (Note: Appearances in UEFA Conference League)	4	—		9	8
Monaco	Total		12	4	0	0	4	4	0	0	16	8
Cercle Brugge (loan)	2024–25	Belgian Pro League	18	3	1	0	6	0	2 (Note: Appearances in Belgian Pro League relegation play-offs)	2	27	5
Career total			32	7	1	0	10	4	2	2	45	13

== Honours ==
Germany U17

- UEFA European Under-17 Championship: 2023
- FIFA U-17 World Cup: 2023

Individual

- UEFA European Under-17 Championship Top Scorer: 2023
- UEFA European Under-17 Championship Player of the Tournament: 2023
- UEFA European Under-17 Championship Team of the Tournament: 2023
- FIFA U-17 World Cup Golden Ball: 2023
- Fritz Walter Medal U17 Gold: 2023
