= Mattia Mannini =

Italian footballer (born 2006)

Personal information
- Date of birth: 8 July 2006 (age 20)
- Place of birth: Sarzana, Italy
- Height: 1.70 m (5 ft 7 in)
- Positions: Right-back; midfielder

Team information
- Current team: Benevento (on loan from Roma)
- Number: 16

Youth career
- Spezia
- 2020–2025: Roma

Senior career*
Years	Team	Apps	(Gls)
2023–	Roma	0	(0)
2025–2026	→ Juve Stabia (loan)	16	(0)
2026–	→ Benevento (loan)	1	(0)

International career^{‡}
2021–2022	Italy U16	10	(1)
2022–2023	Italy U17	16	(6)
2023	Italy U18	1	(0)
2023–2024	Italy U19	18	(5)
2025–	Italy U20	9	(1)
2026–	Italy U21	1	(0)
- * Club domestic league appearances and goals as of 19 September 2026 ‡ National team caps and goals as of 25 September 2026

Mattia Mannini (born 8 July 2006) is an Italian professional footballer who plays as a right-back or midfielder for Serie B club Benevento, on loan from Roma.

== Club career ==
As a youth player, Mannini joined the youth academy of Spezia. In 2020, he joined the youth academy of Serie A side Roma. On 11 October 2023, he was named by English newspaper The Guardian as one of the best players born in 2006 worldwide. On 14 December 2023, Mannini made his professional debut for Roma, coming on as a substitute for Nicola Zalewski in the 85th minute in a 3–0 UEFA Europa League victory over Sheriff Tiraspol in the group stage.

On 1 August 2025, Mannini was loaned to Juve Stabia in Serie B, for the 2025–26 season.

On 1 September 2026, Mannini moved on a new Serie B loan to Benevento, with an option to buy.

== Style of play ==
Mannini plays as a right-back or midfielder and is right-footed. English newspaper The Guardian wrote in 2023 that he "has played across the midfield and in both full-back spots, but in any position he has shown a talent for both winning possession and progressing it".

== Honours ==
Individual

- UEFA European Under-19 Championship Team of the Tournament: 2024
