= Robert Ramšak =

German footballer

Personal information
- Full name: Robert Ramšak
- Date of birth: 28 October 2006 (age 20)
- Place of birth: Munich, Germany
- Height: 1.85 m (6 ft 1 in)
- Positions: Forward; attacking midfielder

Team information
- Current team: Aluminij
- Number: 10

Youth career
- 2014–2024: Bayern Munich
- 2024–2025: RB Leipzig

Senior career*
Years	Team	Apps	(Gls)
2025–2026	RB Leipzig	0	(0)
2025–2026	→ Eintracht Braunschweig (loan)	4	(0)
2025–2026	→ Eintracht Braunschweig II (loan)	2	(0)
2026	→ SV Sandhausen (loan)	12	(0)
2026–	Aluminij	0	(0)

International career^{‡}
2021–2022	Germany U16	6	(0)
2022–2023	Germany U17	23	(7)
2024	Germany U18	1	(0)
2024–2025	Germany U19	11	(2)
Medal record
Men's football
Representing Germany
FIFA U-17 World Cup
Winner	2023 Indonesia
UEFA European Under-17 Championship
Winner	2023 Hungary
- * Club domestic league appearances and goals as of 13:11, 6 June 2026 (UTC) ‡ National team caps and goals as of 23 June 2025

Robert Ramšak (born 28 October 2006) is a German footballer who plays as a forward and attacking midfielder for Slovenian PrvaLiga club Aluminij.

== Club career ==
=== Early career ===
Ramsak joined the youth academy of his hometown club Bayern Munich on 2014.

=== RB Leipzig ===
After ten years with Bayern Munich, his contract expired on 30 June 2024, and he signed as a free agent with fellow Bundesliga club RB Leipzig, initially joining the under-19 team.

Ramsak received his first call up with RB Leipzig for a 2–1 away loss Bundesliga match against VfB Stuttgart on 15 January 2025, three days later on 18 January he was called up again for a 3–3 away draw Bundesliga match against VfL Bochum, both matches as an unused substitute.

==== Loan to Eintracht Braunschweig ====
On 1 September 2025, he joined 2. Bundesliga club Eintracht Braunschweig, on an initial one-year loan with the option to make the move permanent at the end of the 2025–26 season.

==== Loan to SV Sandhausen ====
On 2 February 2026, Ramsak's loan spell with Eintracht Braunschweig was cut short, and he moved on a new loan to recently relegated Regionalliga Südwest club SV Sandhausen, on a six-month loan until the end of the season.

=== Aluminij ===
On 18 August 2026, Ramšak signed a two-year contract with Aluminij in Slovenia.

== International career ==
Ramsak was born in Munich, Germany, to a Slovenian father and a Croatian mother, making him eligible to represent Germany, Croatia and Slovenia. He has represented Germany at youth international level.

=== Youth ===
He managed to win the 2023 UEFA European Under-17 Championship with his country after beating France in the final 5–4 on penalties. He was also the joint top scorer of the tournament with four goals.

== Career statistics ==
As of match played 16 May 2026

Appearances and goals by club, season and competition
Club	Season	League			National cup		Continental		Other		Total	
Club	Season	Division	Apps	Goals	Apps	Goals	Apps	Goals	Apps	Goals	Apps	Goals
RB Leipzig	2025–26	Bundesliga	0	0	0	0	—		—		0	0
Eintracht Braunschweig (loan)	2025–26	2. Bundesliga	4	0	—		—		—		4	0
Eintracht Braunschweig II (loan)	2025–26	Oberliga Niedersachsen	2	0	—		—		—		2	0
SV Sandhausen (loan)	2025–26	Regionalliga Südwest	12	0	—		—		1 (Note: Appearance in Baden Cup)	0	13	0
Career total			18	0	0	0	0	0	1	0	19	0

== Honours ==
Germany U17

- UEFA European Under-17 Championship: 2023
- FIFA U-17 World Cup: 2023

Individual

- UEFA European Under-17 Championship Top Scorer: 2023
