= David Pejičić =

Slovenian footballer (born 2007)

Personal information
- Date of birth: 14 June 2007 (age 19)
- Place of birth: Šempeter pri Gorici, Slovenia
- Height: 1.75 m (5 ft 9 in)
- Position: Midfielder

Team information
- Current team: Koper (on loan from Udinese)

Youth career
- Bilje
- –2021: Gorica
- 2021–2025: Udinese

Senior career*
Years	Team	Apps	(Gls)
2023–	Udinese	0	(0)
2025–2026	→ Maribor (loan)	22	(5)
2026–	→ Koper (loan)	0	(0)

International career^{‡}
2021–2022	Slovenia U15	8	(2)
2022–2024	Slovenia U17	21	(5)
2024–2025	Slovenia U19	15	(4)
2025–	Slovenia U21	6	(2)
- * Club domestic league appearances and goals as of 8 September 2026 ‡ National team caps and goals as of 2 October 2026

David Pejičić (born 14 June 2007) is a Slovenian professional footballer who plays as a midfielder for Slovenian PrvaLiga club Koper, on loan from Serie A club Udinese.

== Youth career ==
Pejičić is a native of Šempeter pri Gorici and began his career at the age of five with Bilje, and later played youth football for Gorica. He was then spotted by Serie A club Udinese, which signed him in early 2021. There, Pejičić was described as "looking like a veteran already" at 15 years old, striking up a partnership with fellow Udinese youngster Simone Pafundi in the youth teams. At that time, Pejičić was garnering interest from some of Europe's biggest clubs, especially Ajax, as reported by Fabrizio Romano. At the age of 15, he had already trained with the club's senior team.

== Club career ==
Pejičić signed his first professional contract with Udinese in July 2023, with the contract running until June 2026.

He made his first-team debut on 1 November 2023, in a Coppa Italia match at home against Cagliari, coming on as a substitute for Etienne Camara in a 2–1 defeat. Udinese coach Gabriele Cioffi commented on the maturity of his performance, stating that 'he (Pejičić) is only 16, but he played like he is 30'.

== International career ==
Pejičić represented Slovenia at youth level, playing for the under-15, under-17, under-19 and under-21 teams.

== Career statistics ==
=== Club ===
As of 2 November 2023

Appearances and goals by club, season and competition
Club	Season	League			National cup (Note: Includes Coppa Italia)		Total	
Club	Season	Division	Apps	Goals	Apps	Goals	Apps	Goals
Udinese	2023–24	Serie A	0	0	1	0	1	0
Career total			0	0	1	0	1	0
