= 2023–24 in French football =

Football in France
- Season: 2023–24

Men's football
- Ligue 1: Paris Saint-Germain
- Ligue 2: Auxerre
- Championnat National: Red Star
- Coupe de France: Paris Saint-Germain
- Trophée des Champions: Paris Saint-Germain

Women's football
- Division 1: Lyon
- Coupe de France: Paris Saint-Germain
- Trophée des Championnes: Lyon

The following article is a summary of the 2023–24 football season in France, which was the 90th season of competitive football in the country and will run from July 2023 to June 2024.

== National team ==
=== France national football team ===
==== Friendlies ====
| 12 September 2023 | Germany | 2–1 | France | Dortmund, Germany |
| 20:45 | Müller 4'; Sané 87' | Report | Griezmann 89' (pen.) | Stadium: Signal Iduna Park; Referee: Anthony Taylor (England) |

| 17 October 2023 | France | 4–1 | Scotland | Villeneuve-d'Ascq, France |
| 20:45 | Pavard 16', 24'; Mbappé 41' (pen.); Coman 70' | Report | Gilmour 11' | Stadium: Stade Pierre-Mauroy; Referee: Tobias Stieler (Germany) |

| 23 March 2024 | France | 0–2 | Germany | Décines-Charpieu, France |
| 21:05 UTC+1 | | Report | Wirtz 1'; Havertz 49' | Stadium: Parc Olympique Lyonnais; Referee: Jesús Gil Manzano (Spain) |

| 26 March 2024 | France | 3–2 | Chile | Marseille, France |
| 21:00 UTC+1 | | | | Stadium: Stade Vélodrome |

| 5 June 2024 | France | 3–0 | Luxembourg | Longeville-lès-Metz, France |
| 21:00 UTC+2 | Kolo Muani 43'; Clauss 70'; Mbappé 85' | Report | | Stadium: Stade Saint-Symphorien; Referee: Lawrence Visser (Belgium) |

| 9 June 2024 | France | 0–0 | Canada | Bordeaux, France |
| 21:15 UTC+2 | | Report | | Stadium: Malmut Atlantique; Attendance: 40,835; Referee: Fábio Veríssimo (Portugal) |

==== UEFA Euro 2024 qualifying ====
===== Group B =====
| Pos | Team | Pld | W | D | L | GF | GA | GD | Pts | Qualification | (France) | (Netherlands) | (Greece) | (Republic of Ireland) | (Gibraltar) |
|---|---|---|---|---|---|---|---|---|---|---|---|---|---|---|---|
| 1 | France | 8 | 7 | 1 | 0 | 29 | 3 | +26 | 22 | Qualify for final tournament | — | 4–0 | 1–0 | 2–0 | 14–0 |
| 2 | Netherlands | 8 | 6 | 0 | 2 | 17 | 7 | +10 | 18 | Qualify for final tournament | 1–2 | — | 3–0 | 1–0 | 3–0 |
| 3 | Greece | 8 | 4 | 1 | 3 | 14 | 8 | +6 | 13 | Advance to play-offs via Nations League | 2–2 | 0–1 | — | 2–1 | 5–0 |
| 4 | Republic of Ireland | 8 | 2 | 0 | 6 | 9 | 10 | −1 | 6 | | 0–1 | 1–2 | 0–2 | — | 3–0 |
| 5 | Gibraltar | 8 | 0 | 0 | 8 | 0 | 41 | −41 | 0 | | 0–3 | 0–6 | 0–3 | 0–4 | — |

Source: UEFA
Rules for classification: Qualification tiebreakers

| 7 September 2023 | France | 2–0 | Republic of Ireland | Paris, France |
| 20:45 | Tchouaméni 19'; Thuram 48' | Report | | Stadium: Parc des Princes; Attendance: 43,995; Referee: Urs Schnyder (Switzerland) |

| 13 October 2023 | Netherlands | 1–2 | France | Amsterdam, Netherlands |
| 20:45 | Hartman 83' | Report | Mbappe 7', 53' | Stadium: Johan Cruyff Arena; Referee: Felix Zwayer (Germany) |

| 18 November 2023 | France | 14–0 | Gibraltar | Nice, France |
| 20:45 | Santos 3' (o.g.); Thuram 4'; Zaïre-Emery 16'; Mbappé 30' (pen.), 74', 82'; Clauss 34'; Coman 36', 65'; Fofana 37'; Rabiot 63'; Dembélé 73'; Giroud 89', 90+1' | Report | | Stadium: Allianz Riviera; Referee: John Brooks (England) |

| 21 November 2023 | Greece | 2–2 | France | Athens, Greece |
| 20:45 (21:45 UTC+2) | Bakasetas 56'; Ioannidis 61' | Report | Kolo Muani 42'; Fofana 74' | Stadium: Agia Sophia Stadium; Referee: Daniel Siebert (Germany) |

==== UEFA Euro 2024 ====
===== Group D =====
| Pos | Team | Pld | W | D | L | GF | GA | GD | Pts | Qualification |
|---|---|---|---|---|---|---|---|---|---|---|
| 1 | Austria | 3 | 2 | 0 | 1 | 6 | 4 | +2 | 6 | Advance to knockout stage |
| 2 | France | 3 | 1 | 2 | 0 | 2 | 1 | +1 | 5 | Advance to knockout stage |
| 3 | Netherlands | 3 | 1 | 1 | 1 | 4 | 4 | 0 | 4 | Advance to knockout stage |
| 4 | Poland | 3 | 0 | 1 | 2 | 3 | 6 | −3 | 1 | |

Source: UEFA

| 17 June 2024 | Austria | 0–1 | France | Düsseldorf, Germany |
| 21:00 | | Report | Wöber 38' (o.g.) | Stadium: Merkur Spiel-Arena; Attendance: 46,425; Referee: Jesús Gil Manzano (Spain) |

| 21 June 2024 | Netherlands | 0–0 | France | Leipzig, Germany |
| 21:00 | | Report | | Stadium: Red Bull Arena; Attendance: 38,531; Referee: Anthony Taylor (England) |

| 25 June 2024 | France | 1–1 | Poland | Dortmund, Germany |
| 18:00 | Mbappé 56' (pen.) | Report | Lewandowski 79' (pen.) | Stadium: Westfalenstadion; Attendance: 59,728; Referee: Marco Guida (Italy) |

===== Knockout stage =====
| 1 July 2024 R16 | France | 1–0 | Belgium | Düsseldorf, Germany |
| 18:00 | Vertonghen 85' (o.g.) | Report | | Stadium: Merkur Spiel-Arena; Attendance: 46,810; Referee: Glenn Nyberg (Sweden) |

| 5 July 2024 QF | Portugal | 0–0 (a.e.t.) (3–5 p) | France | Hamburg, Germany |
| 21:00 | | Report | | Stadium: Volksparkstadion; Attendance: 47,789; Referee: Michael Oliver (England) |
| | Penalties |
| | Ronaldo (penalty scored); B. Silva (penalty scored); Félix (penalty missed); Mendes (penalty scored) | | (penalty scored) Dembélé; (penalty scored) Fofana; (penalty scored) Koundé; (penalty scored) Barcola; (penalty scored) Hernandez |

| 9 July 2024 SF | Spain | 2–1 | France | Munich, Germany |
| 21:00 | Yamal 21'; Olmo 25' | Report | Kolo Muani 9' | Stadium: Allianz Arena; Attendance: 62,042; Referee: Slavko Vinčić (Slovenia) |

=== U–17 ===
==== FIFA U-17 World Cup ====
===== Group E =====
| Pos | Team | Pld | W | D | L | GF | GA | GD | Pts | Qualification |
|---|---|---|---|---|---|---|---|---|---|---|
| 1 | France | 3 | 3 | 0 | 0 | 7 | 0 | +7 | 9 | Knockout stage |
| 2 | United States | 3 | 2 | 0 | 1 | 5 | 5 | 0 | 6 | Knockout stage |
| 3 | Burkina Faso | 3 | 1 | 0 | 2 | 3 | 6 | −3 | 3 | |
| 4 | South Korea | 3 | 0 | 0 | 3 | 2 | 6 | −4 | 0 | |

Source: FIFA

| 12 November 2023 | France | 3–0 | Burkina Faso | Jakarta, Indonesia |
| | Lambourde 49'; Tincres 81' (pen.); Gomis 87' (pen.) | Report | | Stadium: Jakarta International Stadium; Attendance: 7,033; Referee: Fu Ming (China) |

| 15 November 2023 | France | 1–0 | South Korea | Jakarta, Indonesia |
| | Amougou 2' | Report | | Stadium: Jakarta International Stadium; Attendance: 7,476; Referee: Mutaz Ibrahim (Libya) |

| 18 November 2023 | United States | 0–3 | France | Jakarta, Indonesia |
| | | Report | Tincres 45+2', 82'; Meupiyou 86' | Stadium: Jakarta International Stadium; Referee: Dahane Beida (Mauritania) |

===== Knockout stage =====
| 22 November 2023 R16 | France | 0–0 (5–3 p) | Senegal | Jakarta, Indonesia |
| | | Report | | Stadium: Jakarta International Stadium; Attendance: 12,238; Referee: Roberto Pérez (Peru) |
| | Penalties |
| | Kayi Sanda (penalty scored); Zague (penalty scored); Tincres (penalty scored); Meupiyou (penalty scored); Sangui (penalty scored) | | (penalty scored) Gueye; (penalty missed) Diong; (penalty scored) Dorival; (penalty scored) Sawane |

| 25 November 2023 QF | France | 1–0 | Uzbekistan | Surakarta, Indonesia |
| | Bouneb 83' | Report | | Stadium: Manahan Stadium; Attendance: 5,201; Referee: Dahane Beida (Mauritania) |

| 28 November 2023 SF | France | 2–1 | Mali | Surakarta, Indonesia |
| | Titi 56'; Bouneb 69' | Report | I. Diarra 45+4' | Stadium: Manahan Stadium; Attendance: 12,013; Referee: Gustavo Tejera (Uruguay) |

| 2 December 2023 F | Germany | 2–2 (4–3 p) | France | Surakarta, Indonesia |
| 19:00 | Brunner 29' (pen.); Darvich 51' | Report | Bouabré 53'; Amougou 85' | Stadium: Manahan Stadium; Attendance: 13,037; Referee: Espen Eskås (Norway) |
| | Penalties |
| | Da Silva Moreira (penalty missed); Ramsak (penalty scored); Moerstedt (penalty scored); Harchaoui (penalty scored); Brunner (penalty missed); Kabar (penalty scored) | | (penalty scored) Kayi Sanda; (penalty scored) Bouneb; (penalty missed) Sangui; (penalty missed) Meupiyou; (penalty scored) Tincres; (penalty missed) Gomis |

=== France women's national football team ===
==== Friendlies ====
| 6 July 2023 | Republic of Ireland | 0–3 | France | Dublin, Ireland |
| | | | | Stadium: Tallaght Stadium |

| 14 July 2023 | Australia | 1–0 | France | Melbourne, Australia |
| | | Source | | Stadium: Marvel Stadium |

==== 2023 FIFA Women's World Cup ====
===== 2023 FIFA Women's World Cup Group F =====
| Pos | Team | Pld | W | D | L | GF | GA | GD | Pts | Qualification |
|---|---|---|---|---|---|---|---|---|---|---|
| 1 | France | 3 | 2 | 1 | 0 | 8 | 4 | +4 | 7 | Advance to knockout stage |
| 2 | Jamaica | 3 | 1 | 2 | 0 | 1 | 0 | +1 | 5 | Advance to knockout stage |
| 3 | Brazil | 3 | 1 | 1 | 1 | 5 | 2 | +3 | 4 | |
| 4 | Panama | 3 | 0 | 0 | 3 | 3 | 11 | −8 | 0 | |

Source: FIFA
Rules for classification: Group stage tiebreakers

| 23 July 2023 | France | 0–0 | Jamaica | Sydney, Australia |
| | | Report | | Stadium: Sydney Football Stadium; Attendance: 39,045; Referee: María Carvajal (Chile) |

| 29 July 2023 | France | 2–1 | Brazil | Brisbane, Australia |
| | Le Sommer 17'; Renard 83' | Report | Debinha 58' | Stadium: Lang Park; Attendance: 49,378; Referee: Kate Jacewicz (Australia) |

| 2 August 2023 | Panama | 3–6 | France | Sydney, Australia |
| | Cox 2'; Pinzón 64' (pen.); L. Cedeño 87' | Report | Lakrar 21'; Diani 28', 37' (pen.), 52' (pen.); Le Garrec 45+5'; Bècho 90+10' | Stadium: Sydney Football Stadium; Attendance: 40,498; Referee: Laura Fortunato (Argentina) |

===== Knockout stage =====
| 8 August 2023 R16 | France | 4–0 | Morocco | Adelaide, Australia |
| | Diani 15'; Dali 20'; Le Sommer 23', 70' | Report | | Stadium: Hindmarsh Stadium; Attendance: 13,557; Referee: Tori Penso (United States) |

| 12 August 2023 QF | Australia | 0–0 (a.e.t.) (7–6 p) | France | Brisbane, Australia |
| | | Report | | Stadium: Lang Park; Attendance: 49,461; Referee: María Carvajal (Chile) |
| | Penalties |
| | Foord (penalty scored); Catley (penalty missed); Kerr (penalty scored); Fowler (penalty scored); Arnold (penalty missed); Gorry (penalty scored); Yallop (penalty scored); Carpenter (penalty scored); Hunt (penalty missed); Vine (penalty scored) | | (penalty missed) Bacha; (penalty scored) Diani; (penalty scored) Renard; (penalty scored) Le Sommer; (penalty missed) Périsset; (penalty scored) Geyoro; (penalty scored) Karchaoui; (penalty scored) Lakrar; (penalty missed) Dali; (penalty missed) Bècho |

==== UEFA Women's Nations League ====
===== 2023–24 UEFA Women's Nations League A Group A2 =====
| Pos | Team | Pld | W | D | L | GF | GA | GD | Pts | Qualification or relegation | (France) | (Austria) | (Norway) | (Portugal) |
|---|---|---|---|---|---|---|---|---|---|---|---|---|---|---|
| 1 | France | 6 | 5 | 1 | 0 | 9 | 1 | +8 | 16 | Qualification for Nations League Finals | — | 3–0 | 0–0 | 2–0 |
| 2 | Austria | 6 | 3 | 1 | 2 | 7 | 8 | −1 | 10 | | 0–1 | — | 2–1 | 2–1 |
| 3 | Norway (O) | 6 | 1 | 2 | 3 | 9 | 8 | +1 | 5 | Qualification for relegation play-offs | 1–2 | 1–1 | — | 4–0 |
| 4 | Portugal (R) | 6 | 1 | 0 | 5 | 5 | 13 | −8 | 3 | Relegation to League B | 0–1 | 1–2 | 3–2 | — |

Source: UEFA
Rules for classification: Tiebreakers
(O) Play-off winners; (R) Relegated

| 22 September 2023 | France | 2–0 | Portugal | Valenciennes |
| | Geyoro 27'; Bacha 89' | Report | | Stadium: Stade du Hainaut; Referee: Tess Olofsson (Sweden) |

| 26 September 2023 | Austria | 0–1 | France | Vienna |
| | | Report | Renard 5' | Stadium: Franz Horr Stadium; Referee: Jelena Cvetković (Serbia |

| 27 October 2023 | Norway | 1–2 | France | Oslo |
| | Lund 60' | Report | Mjelde 23' (o.g.); Renard 69' | Stadium: Ullevaal Stadion; Referee: Rebecca Welch (England) |

| 31 October 2023 | France | 0–0 | Norway | Reims |
| | | Report | | Stadium: Stade Auguste-Delaune; Referee: Kateryna Monzul (Ukraine) |

| 1 December 2023 | France | 3–0 | Austria | Rennes |
| | | Report | | Stadium: Roazhon Park |

| 5 December 2023 | Portugal | v | France | Leiria |
| | 0–1 | Report | | Stadium: Estádio Dr. Magalhães Pessoa |

===== Nations League Finals =====
| 23 February 2023–24 UEFA Nations League SF | France | 2–1 | Germany | Décines-Charpieu |
| 21:00 | Diani 41'; Karchaoui 45+4' (pen.) | Report | Gwinn 82' (pen.) | Stadium: Parc Olympique Lyonnais; Referee: Esther Staubli (Switzerland) |

| 28 February 2023–24 UEFA Nations League F | Spain | 2–0 | France | Seville, Spain |
| | | Report | | Stadium: Estadio de La Cartuja |

==== UEFA Women's Euro 2025 qualifying League A ====
| Pos | Team | Pld | W | D | L | GF | GA | GD | Pts | Qualification | (France) | (England) | (Sweden) | (Republic of Ireland) |
|---|---|---|---|---|---|---|---|---|---|---|---|---|---|---|
| 1 | France | 6 | 4 | 0 | 2 | 8 | 7 | +1 | 12 | Qualify for final tournament | — | 1–2 | 2–1 | 1–0 |
| 2 | England | 6 | 3 | 2 | 1 | 8 | 5 | +3 | 11 | Qualify for final tournament | 1–2 | — | 1–1 | 2–1 |
| 3 | Sweden | 6 | 2 | 2 | 2 | 6 | 4 | +2 | 8 | Advance to play-offs (seeded) | 0–1 | 0–0 | — | 1–0 |
| 4 | Republic of Ireland (R) | 6 | 1 | 0 | 5 | 4 | 10 | −6 | 3 | Advance to play-offs (seeded) and relegation to League B | 3–1 | 0–2 | 0–3 | — |

Source: UEFA
Rules for classification: Tiebreakers
(R) Relegated

| 5 April 2024 | France | 1–0 | Republic of Ireland | Metz |
| | Katoto 6' | Report | | Stadium: Stade Saint-Symphorien; Referee: Maria Sole Ferrieri Caputi (Italy) |

| 9 April 2024 | Sweden | 0–1 | France | Gothenburg, Sweden |
| | | Report | Renard 80' | Stadium: Gamla Ullevi; Referee: Ewa Augustyn (Poland) |

| 31 May 2024 | England | 1–2 | France | Newcastle, England |
| | Mead 30' | Report | De Almeida 41'; Katoto 68' | Stadium: St James Park; Attendance: 42,561; Referee: Marta Huerta De Aza (Spain) |

| 4 June 2024 | France | 1–2 | England | Saint-Étienne |
| | Diani 72' (pen.) | Report | Stanway 21'; Russo 34' | Stadium: Stade Geoffroy-Guichard; Attendance: 10,194; Referee: Ivana Martinčić (Croatia) |

== UEFA competitions ==
=== UEFA Champions League ===
==== Qualifying rounds ====
===== Third qualifying round =====
| Team 1 | Agg. | Team 2 | 1st leg | 2nd leg |
|---|---|---|---|---|
| Panathinaikos (Greece) | 2–2 (5–3 p) | (France) Marseille | 1–0 | 1–2 (a.e.t.) |

==== Group stage ====
===== Group B =====
| Pos | Team | Pld | W | D | L | GF | GA | GD | Pts | Qualification | ARS | PSV | LEN | SEV |
|---|---|---|---|---|---|---|---|---|---|---|---|---|---|---|
| 1 | (England) Arsenal | 6 | 4 | 1 | 1 | 16 | 4 | +12 | 13 | Advance to knockout phase | — | 4–0 | 6–0 | 2–0 |
| 2 | (Netherlands) PSV Eindhoven | 6 | 2 | 3 | 1 | 8 | 10 | −2 | 9 | Advance to knockout phase | 1–1 | — | 1–0 | 2–2 |
| 3 | (France) Lens | 6 | 2 | 2 | 2 | 6 | 11 | −5 | 8 | Transfer to Europa League | 2–1 | 1–1 | — | 2–1 |
| 4 | (Spain) Sevilla | 6 | 0 | 2 | 4 | 7 | 12 | −5 | 2 | | 1–2 | 2–3 | 1–1 | — |

Source: UEFA

===== Group G =====
| Pos | Team | Pld | W | D | L | GF | GA | GD | Pts | Qualification | DOR | PAR | MIL | NEW |
|---|---|---|---|---|---|---|---|---|---|---|---|---|---|---|
| 1 | (Germany) Borussia Dortmund | 6 | 3 | 2 | 1 | 7 | 4 | +3 | 11 | Advance to knockout phase | — | 1–1 | 0–0 | 2–0 |
| 2 | (France) Paris Saint-Germain | 6 | 2 | 2 | 2 | 9 | 8 | +1 | 8 (Note: Tied on head-to-head points. Head-to-head goal difference: Paris Saint-Germain +2, Milan −2.) | Advance to knockout phase | 2–0 | — | 3–0 | 1–1 |
| 3 | (Italy) Milan | 6 | 2 | 2 | 2 | 5 | 8 | −3 | 8 | Transfer to Europa League | 1–3 | 2–1 | — | 0–0 |
| 4 | (England) Newcastle United | 6 | 1 | 2 | 3 | 6 | 7 | −1 | 5 | | 0–1 | 4–1 | 1–2 | — |

Source: UEFA

==== Knockout phase ====
===== Round of 16 =====
| Team 1 | Agg. | Team 2 | 1st leg | 2nd leg |
|---|---|---|---|---|
| Paris Saint-Germain (France) | 4–1 | (Spain) Real Sociedad | 2–0 | 2–1 |

===== Quarter-finals =====
| Team 1 | Agg. | Team 2 | 1st leg | 2nd leg |
|---|---|---|---|---|
| Paris Saint-Germain (France) | 6–4 | (Spain) Barcelona | 2–3 | 4–1 |

===== Semi-finals =====
| Team 1 | Agg. | Team 2 | 1st leg | 2nd leg |
|---|---|---|---|---|
| Borussia Dortmund (Germany) | 2–0 | (France) Paris Saint-Germain | 1–0 | 1–0 |

=== UEFA Europa League ===
==== Group stage ====
===== Group B =====
| Pos | Team | Pld | W | D | L | GF | GA | GD | Pts | Qualification | BHA | MAR | AJA | AEK |
|---|---|---|---|---|---|---|---|---|---|---|---|---|---|---|
| 1 | (England) Brighton & Hove Albion | 6 | 4 | 1 | 1 | 10 | 5 | +5 | 13 | Advance to round of 16 | — | 1–0 | 2–0 | 2–3 |
| 2 | (France) Marseille | 6 | 3 | 2 | 1 | 14 | 10 | +4 | 11 | Advance to knockout round play-offs | 2–2 | — | 4–3 | 3–1 |
| 3 | (Netherlands) Ajax | 6 | 1 | 2 | 3 | 10 | 13 | −3 | 5 | Transfer to Europa Conference League | 0–2 | 3–3 | — | 3–1 |
| 4 | (Greece) AEK Athens | 6 | 1 | 1 | 4 | 6 | 12 | −6 | 4 | | 0–1 | 0–2 | 1–1 | — |

Source: UEFA

===== Group E =====
| Pos | Team | Pld | W | D | L | GF | GA | GD | Pts | Qualification | LIV | TOU | USG | LAS |
|---|---|---|---|---|---|---|---|---|---|---|---|---|---|---|
| 1 | (England) Liverpool | 6 | 4 | 0 | 2 | 17 | 7 | +10 | 12 | Advance to round of 16 | — | 5–1 | 2–0 | 4–0 |
| 2 | (France) Toulouse | 6 | 3 | 2 | 1 | 8 | 9 | −1 | 11 | Advance to knockout round play-offs | 3–2 | — | 0–0 | 1–0 |
| 3 | (Belgium) Union Saint-Gilloise | 6 | 2 | 2 | 2 | 5 | 8 | −3 | 8 | Transfer to Europa Conference League | 2–1 | 1–1 | — | 2–1 |
| 4 | (Austria) LASK | 6 | 1 | 0 | 5 | 6 | 12 | −6 | 3 | | 1–3 | 1–2 | 3–0 | — |

Source: UEFA

===== Group E =====
| Pos | Team | Pld | W | D | L | GF | GA | GD | Pts | Qualification | VIL | REN | MHA | PAO |
|---|---|---|---|---|---|---|---|---|---|---|---|---|---|---|
| 1 | (Spain) Villarreal | 6 | 4 | 1 | 1 | 9 | 7 | +2 | 13 | Advance to round of 16 | — | 1–0 | 0–0 | 3–2 |
| 2 | (France) Rennes | 6 | 4 | 0 | 2 | 13 | 6 | +7 | 12 | Advance to knockout round play-offs | 2–3 | — | 3–0 | 3–1 |
| 3 | (Israel) Maccabi Haifa | 6 | 1 | 2 | 3 | 3 | 9 | −6 | 5 | Transfer to Europa Conference League | 1–2 | 0–3 | — | 0–0 |
| 4 | (Greece) Panathinaikos | 6 | 1 | 1 | 4 | 7 | 10 | −3 | 4 | | 2–0 | 1–2 | 1–2 | — |

Source: UEFA

==== Knockout stage ====
===== Knockout round play-offs =====
| Team 1 | Agg. | Team 2 | 1st leg | 2nd leg |
|---|---|---|---|---|
| Milan (Italy) | 5–3 | (France) Rennes | 3–0 | 2–3 |
| Lens (France) | 2–3 | (Germany) SC Freiburg | 0–0 | 2–3 (a.e.t.) |
| Benfica (Portugal) | 2–1 | (France) Toulouse | 2–1 | 0–0 |
| Shakhtar Donetsk (Ukraine) | 3–5 | (France) Marseille | 2–2 | 1–3 |

===== Round of 16 =====
| Team 1 | Agg. | Team 2 | 1st leg | 2nd leg |
|---|---|---|---|---|
| Marseille (France) | 5–3 | (Spain) Villarreal | 4–0 | 1–3 |

===== Quarter-finals =====
| Team 1 | Agg. | Team 2 | 1st leg | 2nd leg |
|---|---|---|---|---|
| Benfica (Portugal) | 2–2 (2–4 p) | (France) Marseille | 2–1 | 0–1 (a.e.t.) |

===== Semi-finals =====
| Team 1 | Agg. | Team 2 | 1st leg | 2nd leg |
|---|---|---|---|---|
| Marseille (France) | 1–4 | (Italy) Atalanta | 1–1 | 0–3 |

=== UEFA Europa Conference League ===
==== Play-off round ====
| Team 1 | Agg. | Team 2 | 1st leg | 2nd leg |
|---|---|---|---|---|
| Lille (France) | 3–2 | (Croatia) Rijeka | 2–1 | 1–1 (a.e.t.) |

==== Group stage ====
===== Group A =====
| Pos | Team | Pld | W | D | L | GF | GA | GD | Pts | Qualification | LOSC | SLO | LJU | KÍ |
|---|---|---|---|---|---|---|---|---|---|---|---|---|---|---|
| 1 | (France) Lille | 6 | 4 | 2 | 0 | 10 | 2 | +8 | 14 | Advance to round of 16 | — | 2–1 | 2–0 | 3–0 |
| 2 | (Slovakia) Slovan Bratislava | 6 | 3 | 1 | 2 | 8 | 7 | +1 | 10 | Advance to knockout round play-offs | 1–1 | — | 1–2 | 2–1 |
| 3 | (Slovenia) Olimpija Ljubljana | 6 | 2 | 0 | 4 | 4 | 9 | −5 | 6 | | 0–2 | 0–1 | — | 2–0 |
| 4 | (Faroe Islands) KÍ | 6 | 1 | 1 | 4 | 5 | 9 | −4 | 4 | | 0–0 | 1–2 | 3–0 | — |

Source: UEFA

==== Knockout phase ====
===== Round of 16 =====
| Team 1 | Agg. | Team 2 | 1st leg | 2nd leg |
|---|---|---|---|---|
| Sturm Graz (Austria) | 1–4 | (France) Lille | 0–3 | 1–1 |

===== Quarter-finals =====
| Team 1 | Agg. | Team 2 | 1st leg | 2nd leg |
|---|---|---|---|---|
| Aston Villa (England) | 3–3 (4–3 p) | (France) Lille | 2–1 | 1–2 (a.e.t.) |

=== UEFA Women's Champions League ===
==== Round 1 ====
===== Semi-finals =====
| Team 1 | Score | Team 2 |
|---|---|---|
| Paris FC (France) | 4–0 | (Ukraine) Kryvbas Kryvyi Rih |

===== Final =====
| Team 1 | Score | Team 2 |
|---|---|---|
| Arsenal (England) | 3–3 (a.e.t.) (2–4 p) | (France) Paris FC |

==== Round 2 ====
| Team 1 | Agg. | Team 2 | 1st leg | 2nd leg |
|---|---|---|---|---|
| Paris FC (France) | 5–3 | (Germany) VfL Wolfsburg | 3–3 | 2–0 |
| Manchester United (England) | 2–4 | (France) Paris Saint-Germain | 1–1 | 1–3 |

==== Group stage ====
===== Group B =====
| Pos | Team | Pld | W | D | L | GF | GA | GD | Pts | Qualification | LYO | BRA | PRA | PÖL |
|---|---|---|---|---|---|---|---|---|---|---|---|---|---|---|
| 1 | (France) Lyon | 6 | 4 | 2 | 0 | 25 | 5 | +20 | 14 | Advance to quarter-finals | — | 3–1 | 2–2 | 2–0 |
| 2 | (Norway) Brann | 6 | 4 | 1 | 1 | 9 | 7 | +2 | 13 | Advance to quarter-finals | 2–2 | — | 1–0 | 2–1 |
| 3 | (Czech Republic) Slavia Prague | 6 | 1 | 2 | 3 | 3 | 13 | −10 | 5 | | 0–9 | 0–1 | — | 1–0 |
| 4 | (Austria) St. Pölten | 6 | 0 | 1 | 5 | 2 | 14 | −12 | 1 | | 0–7 | 1–2 | 0–0 | — |

Source: UEFA
Rules for classification: Group stage tiebreakers

===== Group C =====
| Pos | Team | Pld | W | D | L | GF | GA | GD | Pts | Qualification | PSG | AJA | BAY | ROM |
|---|---|---|---|---|---|---|---|---|---|---|---|---|---|---|
| 1 | (France) Paris Saint-Germain | 6 | 3 | 1 | 2 | 10 | 8 | +2 | 10 | Advance to quarter-finals | — | 3–1 | 0–1 | 2–1 |
| 2 | (Netherlands) Ajax | 6 | 3 | 1 | 2 | 7 | 8 | −1 | 10 | Advance to quarter-finals | 2–0 | — | 1–0 | 2–1 |
| 3 | (Germany) Bayern Munich | 6 | 1 | 4 | 1 | 8 | 8 | 0 | 7 | | 2–2 | 1–1 | — | 2–2 |
| 4 | (Italy) Roma | 6 | 1 | 2 | 3 | 10 | 11 | −1 | 5 | | 1–3 | 3–0 | 2–2 | — |

Source: UEFA
Rules for classification: Group stage tiebreakers

===== Group D =====
| Pos | Team | Pld | W | D | L | GF | GA | GD | Pts | Qualification | CHE | HAC | PFC | RMA |
|---|---|---|---|---|---|---|---|---|---|---|---|---|---|---|
| 1 | (England) Chelsea | 6 | 4 | 2 | 0 | 15 | 5 | +10 | 14 | Advance to quarter-finals | — | 0–0 | 4–1 | 2–1 |
| 2 | (Sweden) BK Häcken | 6 | 3 | 2 | 1 | 6 | 5 | +1 | 11 | Advance to quarter-finals | 1–3 | — | 0–0 | 2–1 |
| 3 | (France) Paris FC | 6 | 2 | 1 | 3 | 5 | 11 | −6 | 7 | | 0–4 | 1–2 | — | 2–1 |
| 4 | (Spain) Real Madrid | 6 | 0 | 1 | 5 | 5 | 10 | −5 | 1 | | 2–2 | 0–1 | 0–1 | — |

Source: UEFA
Rules for classification: Group stage tiebreakers

==== Knockout phase ====
===== Quarter-finals =====
| Team 1 | Agg. | Team 2 | 1st leg | 2nd leg |
|---|---|---|---|---|
| Benfica (Portugal) | 2–6 | (France) Lyon | 1–2 | 1–4 |
| Häcken (Sweden) | 1–5 | (France) Paris Saint-Germain | 1–2 | 0–3 |

===== Semi-finals =====
| Team 1 | Agg. | Team 2 | 1st leg | 2nd leg |
|---|---|---|---|---|
| Lyon (France) | 5–3 | (France) Paris Saint-Germain | 3–2 | 2–1 |

===== Final =====
25 May 2024
18:00 UTC+2

| Barcelona (Spain) | 2–0 | (France) Lyon |
|---|---|---|
| Bonmatí 63'; Putellas 90+5' | Report |

San Mamés Stadium, Bilbao
Attendance: 50,827
Referee: Rebecca Welch (England)

=== UEFA Youth League ===
==== UEFA Champions League Path ====
===== Group stage =====
====== Group B ======
| Pos | Team | Pld | W | D | L | GF | GA | GD | Pts | Qualification | LEN | SEV | PSV | ARS |
|---|---|---|---|---|---|---|---|---|---|---|---|---|---|---|
| 1 | (French Football Federation) Lens | 6 | 4 | 1 | 1 | 7 | 4 | +3 | 13 | Round of 16 | — | 1–1 | 2–1 | 1–0 |
| 2 | (Royal Spanish Football Federation) Sevilla | 6 | 2 | 3 | 1 | 6 | 5 | +1 | 9 | Play-offs | 0–1 | — | 1–0 | 2–1 |
| 3 | (Royal Dutch Football Association) PSV Eindhoven | 6 | 2 | 1 | 3 | 7 | 8 | −1 | 7 | | 2–0 | 1–1 | — | 1–3 |
| 4 | (The Football Association) Arsenal | 6 | 1 | 1 | 4 | 6 | 9 | −3 | 4 | | 0–2 | 1–1 | 1–2 | — |

Source: UEFA

====== Group F ======
| Pos | Team | Pld | W | D | L | GF | GA | GD | Pts | Qualification | MIL | DOR | NEW | PAR |
|---|---|---|---|---|---|---|---|---|---|---|---|---|---|---|
| 1 | (Italian Football Federation) Milan | 6 | 4 | 0 | 2 | 14 | 8 | +6 | 12 | Round of 16 | — | 4–1 | 4–0 | 3–2 |
| 2 | (German Football Association) Borussia Dortmund | 6 | 3 | 1 | 2 | 9 | 9 | 0 | 10 | Play-offs | 1–2 | — | 2–2 | 2–0 |
| 3 | (The Football Association) Newcastle United | 6 | 2 | 1 | 3 | 8 | 11 | −3 | 7 | | 3–1 | 1–2 | — | 0–1 |
| 4 | (French Football Federation) Paris Saint-Germain | 6 | 2 | 0 | 4 | 5 | 8 | −3 | 6 | | 1–0 | 0–1 | 1–2 | — |

Source: UEFA

==== Domestic Champions Path ====
===== First Round =====
| Team 1 | Agg. | Team 2 | 1st leg | 2nd leg |
|---|---|---|---|---|
| Lech Poznań (Poland) | 1–1 (2–4 p) | (France) Nantes | 1–1 | 0–0 |

===== Second Round =====
| Team 1 | Agg. | Team 2 | 1st leg | 2nd leg |
|---|---|---|---|---|
| Nantes (France) | 1–1 (4–3 p) | (Finland) HJK | 1–0 | 0–1 |

==== Knockout phase ====
===== Play-offs =====
| Team 1 | Score | Team 2 |
|---|---|---|
| Nantes (France) | 3–3 (3–2 p) | (Spain) Sevilla |

===== Round of 16 =====
| Team 1 | Score | Team 2 |
|---|---|---|
| Red Bull Salzburg (Austria) | 0–1 | (France) Nantes |
| Olympiacos (Greece) | 2–2 (4–2 p) | (France) Lens |

===== Quarter-finals =====
| Team 1 | Score | Team 2 |
|---|---|---|
| Nantes (France) | 3–3 (5–4 p) | (Denmark) Copenhagen |

===== Semi-finals =====
| Team 1 | Score | Team 2 |
|---|---|---|
| Olympiacos (Greece) | 0–0 (3–1 p) | (France) Nantes |

== League season ==
=== Men ===
==== Ligue 1 ====
| Pos | Team | Pld | W | D | L | GF | GA | GD | Pts | Qualification or relegation |
|---|---|---|---|---|---|---|---|---|---|---|
| 1 | Paris Saint-Germain (C) | 34 | 22 | 10 | 2 | 81 | 33 | +48 | 76 | Qualification for the Champions League league phase |
| 2 | Monaco | 34 | 20 | 7 | 7 | 68 | 42 | +26 | 67 | Qualification for the Champions League league phase |
| 3 | Brest | 34 | 17 | 10 | 7 | 53 | 34 | +19 | 61 | Qualification for the Champions League league phase |
| 4 | Lille | 34 | 16 | 11 | 7 | 52 | 34 | +18 | 59 | Qualification for the Champions League third qualifying round |
| 5 | Nice | 34 | 15 | 10 | 9 | 40 | 29 | +11 | 55 | Qualification for the Europa League league phase (Note: Since the 2023–24 Coupe de France winners, Paris Saint-Germain, qualified for the Champions League via league position, the Europa League berth awarded to the cup winners was passed to the sixth-placed team and the Conference League berth was passed to the seventh-placed team.) |
| 6 | Lyon | 34 | 16 | 5 | 13 | 49 | 55 | −6 | 53 | Qualification for the Europa League league phase |
| 7 | Lens | 34 | 14 | 9 | 11 | 45 | 37 | +8 | 51 | Qualification for the Conference League play-off round |
| 8 | Marseille | 34 | 13 | 11 | 10 | 52 | 41 | +11 | 50 | |
| 9 | Reims | 34 | 13 | 8 | 13 | 42 | 47 | −5 | 47 | |
| 10 | Rennes | 34 | 12 | 10 | 12 | 53 | 46 | +7 | 46 | |
| 11 | Toulouse | 34 | 11 | 10 | 13 | 42 | 46 | −4 | 43 | |
| 12 | Montpellier (Note: Montpellier was deducted one point for uncontrolled crowd trouble that caused the abandonment of its match against Clermont.) | 34 | 10 | 12 | 12 | 43 | 48 | −5 | 41 | |
| 13 | Strasbourg | 34 | 10 | 9 | 15 | 38 | 50 | −12 | 39 | |
| 14 | Nantes | 34 | 9 | 6 | 19 | 30 | 55 | −25 | 33 | |
| 15 | Le Havre | 34 | 7 | 11 | 16 | 34 | 45 | −11 | 32 | |
| 16 | Metz (R) | 34 | 8 | 5 | 21 | 35 | 58 | −23 | 29 (Note: Metz finished ahead of Lorient on head-to-head away goals scored: Lorient 2–3 Metz, Metz 1–2 Lorient.) | Qualification for the Relegation play-offs |
| 17 | Lorient (R) | 34 | 7 | 8 | 19 | 43 | 66 | −23 | 29 | Relegation to Ligue 2 |
| 18 | Clermont (R) | 34 | 5 | 10 | 19 | 26 | 60 | −34 | 25 | Relegation to Ligue 2 |

Source: Ligue 1
Rules for classification: 1) Points; 2) Goal difference; 3) Head-to-head points; 4) Head-to-head goal difference; 5) Head-to-head goals scored; 6) Head-to-head away goals scored; 7) Goals scored; 8) Away goals scored; 9) Fair-play points (Note: Head-to-head record is used only after all the matches between the teams in question have been played).
(C) Champions; (R) Relegated

==== Ligue 2 ====
| Pos | Team | Pld | W | D | L | GF | GA | GD | Pts | Promotion or Relegation |
|---|---|---|---|---|---|---|---|---|---|---|
| 1 | Auxerre (C, P) | 38 | 21 | 11 | 6 | 72 | 36 | +36 | 74 | Promotion to Ligue 1 |
| 2 | Angers (P) | 38 | 20 | 8 | 10 | 56 | 42 | +14 | 68 | Promotion to Ligue 1 |
| 3 | Saint-Étienne (O, P) | 38 | 19 | 8 | 11 | 48 | 31 | +17 | 65 | Qualification for promotion play-offs final |
| 4 | Rodez | 38 | 16 | 12 | 10 | 62 | 51 | +11 | 60 | Qualification for promotion play-offs semi-final |
| 5 | Paris FC | 38 | 16 | 11 | 11 | 49 | 42 | +7 | 59 | Qualification for promotion play-offs semi-final |
| 6 | Caen | 38 | 17 | 7 | 14 | 51 | 45 | +6 | 58 | |
| 7 | Laval | 38 | 15 | 10 | 13 | 40 | 45 | −5 | 55 | |
| 8 | Amiens | 38 | 12 | 17 | 9 | 36 | 36 | 0 | 53 | |
| 9 | Guingamp | 38 | 13 | 12 | 13 | 44 | 40 | +4 | 51 | |
| 10 | Pau | 38 | 13 | 12 | 13 | 60 | 57 | +3 | 51 | |
| 11 | Grenoble | 38 | 13 | 12 | 13 | 43 | 44 | −1 | 51 | |
| 12 | Bordeaux (D, R) | 38 | 14 | 9 | 15 | 50 | 52 | −2 | 50 (Note: Bordeaux were deducted 1 point due to federation decision.) | Demoted to National 2 |
| 13 | Bastia | 38 | 14 | 9 | 15 | 44 | 48 | −4 | 50 (Note: Bastia were deducted 1 point due to federation decision.) | |
| 14 | Annecy | 38 | 12 | 10 | 16 | 49 | 50 | −1 | 46 | |
| 15 | Ajaccio | 38 | 12 | 10 | 16 | 35 | 46 | −11 | 46 | |
| 16 | Dunkerque | 38 | 12 | 10 | 16 | 36 | 52 | −16 | 46 | |
| 17 | Troyes | 38 | 9 | 14 | 15 | 42 | 50 | −8 | 41 | Spared from relegation |
| 18 | Quevilly-Rouen (R) | 38 | 7 | 17 | 14 | 51 | 55 | −4 | 38 | Relegation to National |
| 19 | Concarneau (R) | 38 | 10 | 8 | 20 | 39 | 57 | −18 | 38 | Relegation to National |
| 20 | Valenciennes (R) | 38 | 6 | 11 | 21 | 26 | 54 | −28 | 29 | Relegation to National |

Updated to match(es) played on 17 May 2024. Source: Ligue 2
Rules for classification: 1) Points; 2) Goal difference; 3) Number of goals scored; 4) Head-to-head goal difference; 5) Fair play points
(C) Champions; (D) Disqualified; (O) Play-off winners; (P) Promoted; (R) Relegated

==== Championnat National ====
| Pos | Team | Pld | W | D | L | GF | GA | GD | Pts | Promotion or relegation |
|---|---|---|---|---|---|---|---|---|---|---|
| 1 | Red Star (C, P) | 34 | 19 | 8 | 7 | 55 | 34 | +21 | 65 | Promotion to Ligue 2 |
| 2 | Martigues (P) | 34 | 17 | 8 | 9 | 44 | 29 | +15 | 59 | Promotion to Ligue 2 |
| 3 | Niort (D, R) | 34 | 17 | 7 | 10 | 58 | 42 | +16 | 58 | Administrative relegation to Régional 1 |
| 4 | Dijon | 34 | 15 | 9 | 10 | 50 | 41 | +9 | 54 | |
| 5 | Le Mans | 34 | 14 | 10 | 10 | 49 | 44 | +5 | 52 | |
| 6 | Nancy (Note: On 23 June 2023, the FFF announced a deduction of one point for Nancy, applicable to the 2023–24 season, due to incidents in the game against Bourg-Péronnas on the final day of the 2022–23 Championnat National season.) | 34 | 14 | 9 | 11 | 51 | 46 | +5 | 50 | |
| 7 | Rouen (Note: On 28 November 2023, the DNCG announced a deduction of five points for Rouen, due to financial issues. The punishment was upheld on appeal.) | 34 | 15 | 9 | 10 | 41 | 37 | +4 | 49 | |
| 8 | Sochaux | 34 | 12 | 12 | 10 | 51 | 44 | +7 | 48 | |
| 9 | Versailles | 34 | 12 | 11 | 11 | 41 | 33 | +8 | 47 | |
| 10 | Orléans | 34 | 11 | 11 | 12 | 36 | 37 | −1 | 44 | |
| 11 | Nîmes | 34 | 11 | 11 | 12 | 36 | 43 | −7 | 44 | |
| 12 | Châteauroux | 34 | 10 | 12 | 12 | 41 | 44 | −3 | 42 | |
| 13 | Villefranche (Note: On 19 January 2024, the appeal commission of the FFF announced that Villefranche would have to replay games against Rouen, Avranches and Le Mans after fielding an ineligible player in the original fixtures. The three results were removed from the table.) (T) | 34 | 10 | 11 | 13 | 36 | 43 | −7 | 41 | |
| 14 | GOAL FC (R) | 34 | 10 | 8 | 16 | 43 | 47 | −4 | 38 | Relegation to Championnat National 2 |
| 15 | Avranches (R) | 34 | 11 | 5 | 18 | 37 | 59 | −22 | 38 | Relegation to Championnat National 2 |
| 16 | Marignane GCB (R) | 34 | 9 | 10 | 15 | 37 | 50 | −13 | 37 | Relegation to Championnat National 2 |
| 17 | Épinal (R) | 34 | 9 | 6 | 19 | 39 | 51 | −12 | 33 | Relegation to Championnat National 2 |
| 18 | Cholet (D, R) | 34 | 9 | 5 | 20 | 34 | 55 | −21 | 32 | Administrative relegation to Régional 3 |

Updated to match(es) played on 18 May 2024. Source: soccerway
Rules for classification: 1) head-to-head results; 2) head-to-head goal difference; 3) goal difference; 4) goals scored; 5) fair play points
(C) Champions; (D) Disqualified; (P) Promoted; (R) Relegated; (T) Qualified, but not yet for the particular phase indicated

=== Women ===
==== Division 1 Féminine ====
===== Regular season =====
| Pos | Team | Pld | W | D | L | GF | GA | GD | Pts | Qualification or relegation |
|---|---|---|---|---|---|---|---|---|---|---|
| 1 | Lyon (C) | 22 | 20 | 1 | 1 | 82 | 13 | +69 | 61 | Qualification for playoffs |
| 2 | Paris Saint-Germain | 22 | 15 | 5 | 2 | 67 | 17 | +50 | 50 | Qualification for playoffs |
| 3 | Paris FC | 22 | 13 | 3 | 6 | 56 | 27 | +29 | 42 | Qualification for playoffs |
| 4 | Reims | 22 | 10 | 5 | 7 | 33 | 31 | +2 | 35 | Qualification for playoffs |
| 5 | Fleury | 22 | 10 | 3 | 9 | 37 | 33 | +4 | 33 | |
| 6 | Montpellier | 22 | 9 | 5 | 8 | 33 | 36 | −3 | 32 | |
| 7 | Saint-Étienne | 22 | 9 | 2 | 11 | 31 | 52 | −21 | 29 | |
| 8 | Dijon | 22 | 6 | 5 | 11 | 26 | 47 | −21 | 23 | |
| 9 | Le Havre | 22 | 5 | 8 | 9 | 33 | 49 | −16 | 23 | |
| 10 | Guingamp | 22 | 4 | 4 | 14 | 26 | 49 | −23 | 16 | |
| 11 | Bordeaux (R) | 22 | 3 | 4 | 15 | 17 | 49 | −32 | 13 | Relegation to Division 2 Féminine |
| 12 | Lille (R) | 22 | 2 | 7 | 13 | 27 | 65 | −38 | 13 | Relegation to Division 2 Féminine |

Source: Division 1 Féminine
Rules for classification: 1) points; 2) head-to-head points; 3) head-to-head goal difference; 4) goal difference; 5) goals scored
(C) Champions; (R) Relegated

===== Playoffs =====
Playoffs included four matches. The first match was played between the team with the most points during the regular season and the team which finished fourth. The second match was played between the clubs which finished second and third during the regular season. The winners of both matches qualified for the 2024–25 UEFA Women's Champions League and faced each other in a final match to determine the league champions. A third place playoff was also played between the other two clubs to determine the third club for the Champions League.

Semi-finals
1 | Lyon | 6
4 | Reims | 0
2 | Paris Saint-Germain (p) | 2 (5)
3 | Paris FC | 2 (4)

Final
Lyon | 2
Paris Saint-Germain | 1
Third place playoff
Paris FC (p) | 1 (4)
Reims | 1 (2)

=== Final ===
17 May 2024
21:00 CEST

| Lyon | 2–1 | Paris Saint-Germain |
|---|---|---|
| Cascarino 18'; Diani 22' | | Chawinga 73' |

Parc Olympique Lyonnais, Décines-Charpieu
Referee: Maika Vanderstichel

== Cup competitions ==
=== 2023–24 Coupe de France ===
==== Final ====
25 May 2024
21:00 CEST

| Lyon | 1–2 | Paris Saint-Germain |
|---|---|---|
| O'Brien 55' | Report | Dembélé 22'; Fabián 34' |

Stade Pierre-Mauroy, Villeneuve-d'Ascq
Attendance: 46,577
Referee: François Letexier

=== 2023 Trophée des Champions ===
3 January 2024
20:45 CET

| Paris Saint-Germain | 2–0 | Toulouse |
|---|---|---|
| Lee 3'; Mbappé 44' | Report |

Parc des Princes, Paris
Attendance: 43,792
Referee: Hakim Ben El Hadj

=== 2023–24 Coupe de France Féminine ===
==== Final ====
5 April 2024
15:00 CEST

| Paris Saint-Germain | 1–0 | Fleury |
|---|---|---|
| Martens 73' | Report |

Stade de la Mosson, Montpellier
Referee: Émeline Rochebilière

=== 2023 Trophée des Championnes ===
10 September 2023

| Lyon | 2–0 | Paris Saint-Germain |
|---|---|---|
| Dumornay 35'; Le Sommer 67' | Report |

Stade de l'Aube, Troyes
Referee: Victoria Beyer
