= Anas Alaoui =

Moroccan footballer (born 2006)

Personal information
- Date of birth: 20 April 2006 (age 20)
- Place of birth: Mainz, Germany
- Height: 1.87 m (6 ft 2 in)
- Position: Forward

Team information
- Current team: VfR Mannheim
- Number: 24

Youth career
- –2015: FSV Oppenheim
- 2015–2017: Mainz 05
- 2017–2018: FSV Oppenheim
- 2018–2019: SV Gonsenheim
- 2019–2020: SV Wehen Wiesbaden
- 2020–2024: Eintracht Frankfurt

Senior career*
Years	Team	Apps	(Gls)
2024–2025	Eintracht Frankfurt II	22	(1)
2025–2026	Lecco	15	(1)
2026–	VfR Mannheim	0	(0)

International career^{‡}
2021–2022	Germany U16	4	(0)
2022–2023	Germany U17	2	(0)
2023	Morocco U17	7	(1)
- * Club domestic league appearances and goals as of 22 August 2026 ‡ National team caps and goals as of 25 November 2023

Anas Alaoui (Arabic: أنس العلوي; born 20 April 2006) is a professional footballer who plays as a forward for Regionalliga Südwest club VfR Mannheim. Born in Germany, he is a Morocco and Germany youth international.

== Early life ==
Alaoui was born on 20 April 2006 in Mainz, Germany. Born to Moroccan parents, he is a native of Mainz, Germany.

== Club career ==
As a youth player, Alaoui joined the youth academy of German side FSV Oppenheim. At the age of nine, he joined the youth academy of German side Mainz 05 before returning to the youth academy of German side FSV Oppenheim in 2017.

One year later, he joined the youth academy of German side SV Gonsenheim. In 2019, he joined the youth academy of German side SV Wehen Wiesbaden. Subsequently, he joined the youth academy of Bundesliga side Eintracht Frankfurt in 2020, where he played in the UEFA Youth League and was promoted to the club's reserve team in 2024.

On 2 July 2025, Alaoui signed a two-year contract with Lecco in the Italian third-tier Serie C.

== International career ==
Alaoui is a Morocco and Germany youth international. During November 2023, he played for the Morocco national under-17 football team at the 2023 FIFA U-17 World Cup.

== Style of play ==
Alaoui plays as a forward and is left-footed. German newspaper Die Welt wrote in 2022 that he is "a true penalty-box ace... 1.87 meters tall. Ice-cold in front of goal. A player like him hadn't been developed in Germany for years".
