= Diego Moreira =

Belgian footballer (born 2004)

- Moreira with Belgium in 2026

Personal information
- Full name: Diego Manuel Jadon da Silva Moreira
- Date of birth: 6 August 2004 (age 22)
- Place of birth: Liège, Belgium
- Height: 1.79 m (5 ft 10 1/2 in)
- Positions: Wide midfielder; wing-back; winger

Team information
- Current team: AC Milan
- Number: 22

Youth career
- –2020: Standard Liège
- 2020–2021: Benfica

Senior career*
Years	Team	Apps	(Gls)
2021–2023	Benfica B	25	(3)
2022–2023	Benfica	1	(0)
2023–2024	Chelsea	0	(0)
2023–2024	→ Lyon (loan)	7	(0)
2024–2026	Strasbourg	59	(6)
2026–	AC Milan	8	(4)

International career^{‡}
2019	Belgium U15	2	(0)
2019–2020	Portugal U16	12	(1)
2021	Portugal U18	8	(1)
2022–2023	Portugal U19	12	(2)
2023	Portugal U20	4	(0)
2023–2025	Portugal U21	7	(0)
2025–	Belgium U21	2	(1)
2025–	Belgium	9	(1)
- * Club domestic league appearances and goals as of 21:05, 22 November 2026 (UTC) ‡ National team caps and goals as of 22:50, 15 November 2026 (UTC)

Diego Manuel Jadon da Silva Moreira (Portuguese pronunciation: [diˈɛɣu muˈɾɐjɾɐ]; born 6 August 2004), also known as Moreira Jr., is a Belgian professional footballer who plays as a wide midfielder, wing-back or winger for Serie A club AC Milan and the Belgium national team.

== Early life ==
Moreira was born in Liège, where his father, former Guinea-Bissau international Almami Moreira, was then playing professional football at Standard de Liege. His mother is Émilie Graf. From his mother's side, Moreira is the grandson of Helmut Graf, a German-born footballer who also played for the Belgian club from 1976 to 1982. He is the cousin of Eric da Silva Moreira and Emanuel Moreira, youth international footballers for Germany and Portugal, respectively.

== Club career ==
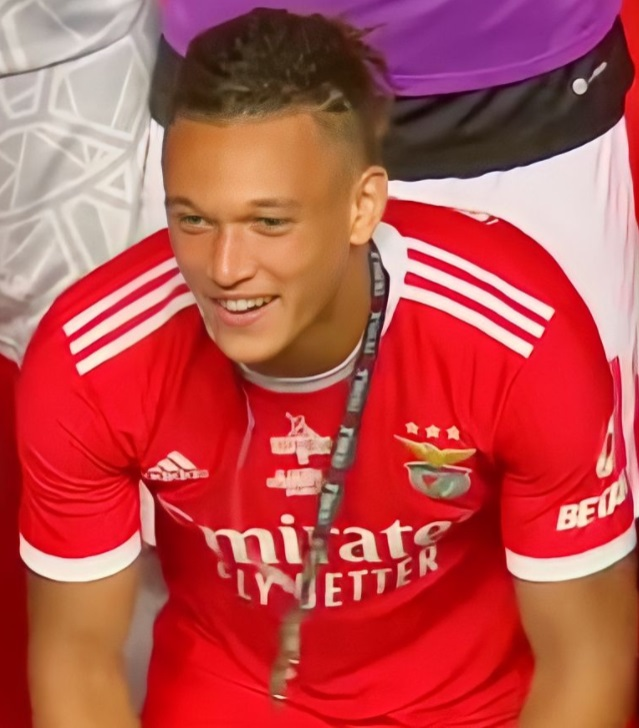
Moreira with Benfica in 2022

=== Early career ===
Coming through the youth ranks at Standard—where his father played until 2006— Moreira first tried to leave the club in 2019 for personal reasons, training with Lierse Kempenzonen, but with the Belgian federation eventually not approving his move. He ended up leaving Les Rouches for Benfica in August 2020, signing his first professional contract with the club from Lisbon, where his father lived.

=== Benfica ===
Moreira started to play with Benfica's under-23 in the Liga Revelação midway through the 2020–21 season. During the following season, he became a regular starter with the U23 team—scoring his first goal with the team during a 3–0 Lisbon derby win against Sporting. He made his professional debut for Benfica B on the 10 January 2022, replacing Tiago Gouveia for the last 15 minutes of a 1–2 home Segunda Liga loss to rivals Porto B.

He played a major role in the UEFA Youth League, where Benfica U19 topped their group against Dynamo Kyiv, Barcelona and Bayern Munich, Moreira most notably scoring a goal against the latter during a 4–0 home win in October 2021. In the final phases, he scored a brace and provided two assists in a 4–0 derby win against Sporting in the quarter-finals; and provided another two assists in the final in a 6–0 win over Red Bull Salzburg to help Benfica win their first Youth League title, and their first title in European football since the 1961–62 European Cup.

Under interim manager Nélson Veríssimo, Moreira was promoted to Benfica's first team alongside seven other Benfica youth team players, making his debut on 13 May 2022, in a 2–0 away win to Paços de Ferreira in the Primeira Liga. However, after refusing to sign a new contract during the pre-season, he was demoted to the B team, and sporadically appeared for the latter, with the team's manager Luís Castro deeming his situation "difficult", before returning to the under-23s for the rest of the season.

=== Chelsea ===
On 1 July 2023, Moreira joined Premier League club Chelsea, following the expiration of his contract with Benfica. On 30 August 2023, he made his debut for the club starting in their EFL Cup second round tie against AFC Wimbledon, featuring for 45 minutes in the eventual 2–1 victory.

==== Loan to Lyon ====
On 1 September 2023, Moreira joined Ligue 1 club Lyon on a season-long loan. He made his debut for the club on 17 September, coming off the bench to replace Ernest Nuamah on the 77th minute of a 0–0 league draw at home to Le Havre. Six days later, he made his first start for Les Gones, playing 52 minutes in a 1–0 league loss away at Brest.

On 22 January 2024, Moreira was recalled from his loan by Chelsea.

=== Strasbourg ===
On 16 August 2024, Moreira joined Ligue 1 club Strasbourg on a permanent transfer. Later that year, on 29 September, he scored his first goal for the club in a 1–0 victory over Marseille.

=== AC Milan ===
On 19 August 2026, Moreira was signed by Serie A club AC Milan for a fee of €50 million, a record sale in Strasbourg history. He signed a five-year contract until 2031.

On 12 September 2026, AC Milan were facing against SS Lazio, Moreira got substituted in the game after half time when AC Milan was down 2-0, he scored his first two goals for AC Milan to tie the game 2-2.

On 31 October 2026, AC Milan were facing their city rivals Inter Milan, Moreira won man of the match after getting two assists and scoring a direct free kick all before half time. Leading Milan to win the Derby della Madonnina at home 3-1.

== International career ==
A dual citizen of Belgium and Portugal —while also eligible to play for both Guinea-Bissau and Germany— Moreira first played with the Belgium under-15 as he was a starter during their 3–1 win against England at St George's Park in February 2019.

But even before leaving to play his club football in Portugal, the youngster chose to switch for the Portuguese national team in 2019, becoming a regular with the under-16 and—after a COVID-interrupted 2020–21 season—with the under-18.

On 19 May 2025, Moreira's request to switch international allegiance to Belgium was approved by FIFA. He was subsequently named in the senior Belgium squad for the 2026 FIFA World Cup qualifying matches against North Macedonia and Wales on 6 and 9 June 2025, respectively.

== Style of play ==
A left-footed winger and wide midfielder able to play on both sides of the attack, Moreira is described as a fast, explosive and technically gifted footballer, most notably excelling in dribbling past his opponent. He is compared to the likes of Portuguese international Nani. During his time at Strasbourg, Moreira transitioned playing into more of a defensive role at left-back under head coach Liam Rosenior.

== Career statistics ==
=== Club ===
As of match played 22 November 2026

Appearances and goals by club, season and competition
Club	Season	League			National cup (Note: Includes Coupe de France)		League cup (Note: Includes EFL Cup)		Europe		Total	
Club	Season	Division	Apps	Goals	Apps	Goals	Apps	Goals	Apps	Goals	Apps	Goals
Benfica B	2021–22	Liga Portugal 2	1	0	—		—		—		1	0
Benfica B	2022–23	Liga Portugal 2	24	3	—		—		—		24	3
Benfica B	Total		25	3	—		—		—		25	3
Benfica	2021–22	Primeira Liga	1	0	0	0	0	0	0	0	1	0
Benfica	2022–23	Primeira Liga	0	0	0	0	0	0	1 (Note: Appearance in UEFA Champions League)	0	1	0
Benfica	Total		1	0	0	0	0	0	1	0	2	0
Chelsea	2023–24	Premier League	0	0	0	0	1	0	—		1	0
Lyon (loan)	2023–24	Ligue 1	7	0	2	0	—		—		9	0
Strasbourg	2024–25	Ligue 1	32	2	2	0	—		—		34	2
Strasbourg	2025–26	Ligue 1	27	4	4	1	—		11 (Note: Appearances in UEFA Conference League)	0	42	5
Strasbourg	Total		59	6	6	1	—		11	0	76	7
AC Milan	2026–27	Serie A	8	4	0	0	—		3 (Note: Appearances in UEFA Europa League)	0	11	4
Career total			100	13	8	1	1	0	15	0	124	14

=== International ===
As of match played 15 November 2026

Appearances and goals by national team and year
National team	Year	Apps	Goals
Belgium	2025	2	0
Belgium	2026	7	1
Total		9	1

As of match played 15 November 2026
Scores and results list Belgium's goal tally first, score column indicates score after each Moreira goal.

List of international goals scored by Diego Moreira
No.	Date	Venue	Cap	Opponent	Score	Result	Competition
1	15 November 2026	King Baudouin Stadium, Brussels, Belgium	9	Italy	4–1	4–1	2026–27 UEFA Nations League A

== Honours ==
Benfica U19

- Campeonato Nacional de Juniores: 2021–22
- UEFA Youth League: 2021–22
- Under-20 Intercontinental Cup: 2022
