= Mohamed Hamony =

Moroccan footballer (born 2006)

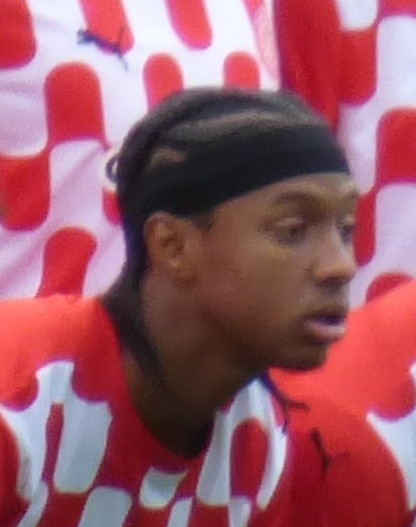
- Hamony with Girona in 2024

Personal information
- Full name: Mohamed Zine El Âbidine Hamony
- Date of birth: 5 August 2006 (age 20)
- Place of birth: Casablanca, Morocco
- Height: 1.78 m (5 ft 10 in)
- Position: Winger

Team information
- Current team: Girona B
- Number: 11

Youth career
- 2017–2019: FC Rouen
- 2019–2020: US Quevilly-Rouen Métropole
- 2020–2024: Le Havre

Senior career*
Years	Team	Apps	(Gls)
2023–2024	Le Havre II	2	(0)
2024–	Girona B	38	(4)

International career
2022–	Morocco U17	10	(1)
2023–	Morocco U18	1	(0)
Medal record
Men's football
Representing Morocco
FIFA U-20 World Cup
Winner	2025 Chile
- * Club domestic league appearances and goals as of 15 May 2026

Mohamed Zine El Âbidine Hamony (Arabic: محمد زين العابدين حموني; born 5 August 2006) is a Moroccan professional footballer who plays as a winger for Spanish club Girona B.

== Early life ==
From Casablanca, Hamony arrived in Rouen, France at the age of eleven years-old. He spent two years in Rouen before spending a season at QRM. He arrived at Le Havre AC at the age of 13 years-old.

== Club career ==
At Le Havre AC he was part of their U17 team which reached the semi-finals of the French U17 championships. He signed a professional contract with the club in May 2023. His performances at the 2023 FIFA U-17 World Cup reportedly led to a number of top division clubs across Europa monitoring his play.

== International career ==
In April 2023, he was selected to represent Morocco national under-17 football team for the U-17 Africa Cup of Nations in Algeria. His side reached the final of the tournament.

In October 2023, he made his debut for the Morocco U18 side against England U18. That month, he was selected for the Morocco U17 squad for the 2023 FIFA U-17 World Cup. Hamony won plaudits for his performance for Morocco U17 in Indonesia. He was singled out for man of-the match awards as his side reached the latter ends of the tournament.

== Style of play ==
He is described as a left winger. At the 2023 FIFA U-17 World Cup, Hamony finished the group stage with the second highest number of successful dribbles per match (4.3) twinned with a success percentage of 76%.

== Personal life ==
His father is Moroccan and his mother is from Guadeloupe.

== Honours ==
Morocco U20

- FIFA U-20 World Cup: 2025
