= Roberto Martín =

Spanish footballer (born 2009)

Personal information
- Full name: Roberto Martín Uruel
- Date of birth: 12 August 2006 (age 20)
- Place of birth: Barbastro, Spain
- Height: 1.77 m (5 ft 10 in)
- Positions: Midfielder; winger

Team information
- Current team: Real Madrid B
- Number: 20

Youth career
- –2018: Escuela River Monzón
- 2018–2020: Huesca
- 2020–2025: Real Madrid

Senior career*
Years	Team	Apps	(Gls)
2025–	Real Madrid B	14	(2)
2025	Real Madrid C	12	(2)

International career^{‡}
2023	Spain U17	13	(1)
2023–2024	Spain U18	5	(0)
2024	Spain U19	1	(0)
- * Club domestic league appearances and goals ‡ National team caps and goals as of 12 October 2024

Roberto Martín Uruel (born 12 August 2006) is a Spanish professional footballer who plays as a midfielder or winger for Real Madrid B.

== Early life ==
Martín was born on 12 August 2009. Born in Barbastro, Spain, he grew up in Monzón, Spain.

== Club career ==
As a youth player, Martín joined the youth academy of Escuela River Monzón. Following his stint there, he joined the youth academy of Huesca in 2018. Two years later, he joined the youth academy of Real Madrid, where he captained the club's under-19 team and helped them win the 2025–26 UEFA Youth League.

Ahead of the 2025–26 season, he was promoted to the reserve team. On 29 August 2025, he debuted for them during a 2–1 home win over Lugo in the league. On 27 September 2025, he scored his first goal for them during a 1–3 home loss to Tenerife in the league. That October, he suffered an injury while playing for them. The injury led to him being sideline for three months.

== International career ==
Martín is a Spain youth international and has represented the country internationally at under-17, under-18, and under-19 levels. During the spring of 2023, he played for the Spain national under-17 football team for 2023 UEFA European Under-17 Championship qualification.

Two months later, he played for the Spain national under-17 football team at the 2023 UEFA European Under-17 Championship. The same year, he played for the Spain national under-17 football team at the 2023 FIFA U-17 World Cup.

== Style of play ==
Martín plays as a midfielder or winger. Right-footed, he is known for his shooting ability.

Spanish newspaper El Español wrote in 2025 that "he has gradually gained prominence due to his versatility. He can play both as a pure central midfielder, where he distributes the ball and breaks lines, and as an attacking midfielder and even a false nine in specific situations... intelligent midfielder with a remarkable ability to get forward into the box. Elegant on the ball and precise with his passing".
