= Hamidou Makalou =

Malian footballer (born 2006)

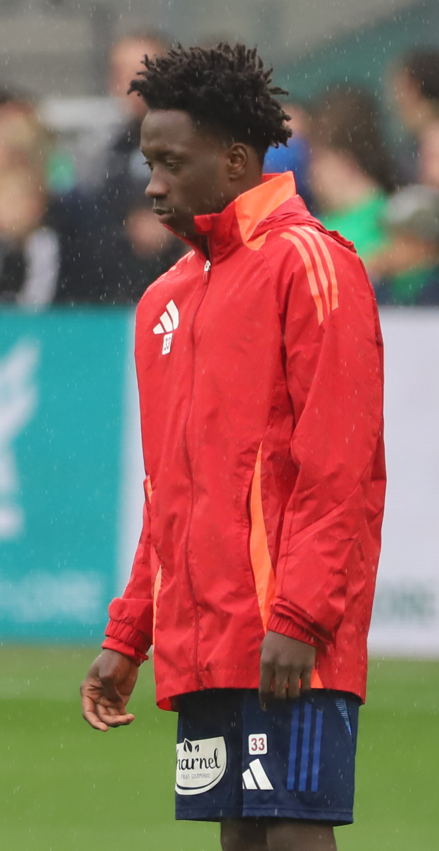

Personal information
- Full name: Hamidou Makalou
- Date of birth: 15 July 2006 (age 20)
- Place of birth: Bamako, Mali
- Height: 1.64 m (5 ft 5 in)
- Position: Defensive midfielder

Team information
- Current team: Bastia (on loan from Brest)
- Number: 3

Youth career
- JMG Academy Bamako

Senior career*
Years	Team	Apps	(Gls)
2023–2025	Guidars FC		
2025–	Brest	21	(0)
2025–	Brest B	5	(0)
2026–	→ Bastia (loan)	1	(0)

International career
2023	Mali U17	7	(2)
Medal record
Men's football
Representing Mali
FIFA U-17 World Cup
Third place	2023 Indonesia
- * Club domestic league appearances and goals as of 5 September 2026

Hamidou Makalou (born 15 July 2006) is a Malian professional footballer who plays as a defensive midfielder for Ligue 3 club Bastia on loan from Brest.

== Club career ==
Born in Bamako, Makalou was a member of the Malian section of the JMG Academy.

On 15 March 2025, Makalou signed for Ligue 1 club Brest on a four-year contract.

== International career ==
Makalou took part in the 2023 FIFA U-17 World Cup with the Mali under-17s. As a starter throughout the tournament, he played an important role to help his team finish in the third place, scoring two goals and assisted one. His performances gained him the tournament's Silver Ball award.

== Playing style ==
Makalou operates mainly as a box-to-box midfielder. His strong mobility and stamina gave him a good ball winning ability in wide areas of the pitch. He also has a good vision of the game, possessing the quality to distribute precise and elaborate passes and playmaking from inside his own half. His play style resembles N'Golo Kanté's.

== Honours ==
Mali U17

- FIFA U-17 World Cup third place: 2023

Individual

- FIFA U-17 World Cup Silver Ball: 2023
