= 2023 FIFA U-17 World Cup =

International football competition

Piala Dunia U-17 FIFA 2023

Tournament details
- Host country: Indonesia
- Dates: 10 November – 2 December
- Teams: 24 (from 6 confederations)
- Venues: 4 (in 4 host cities)

Final positions
- Champions: Germany (1st title)
- Runners-up: France
- Third place: Mali
- Fourth place: Argentina

Tournament statistics
- Matches played: 52
- Goals scored: 175 (3.37 per match)
- Attendance: 437,575 (8,415 per match)
- Top scorer(s): (Argentina) Agustín Ruberto (8 goals)
- Best player: (Germany) Paris Brunner
- Best goalkeeper: (France) Paul Argney
- Fair play award: England

The 2023 FIFA U-17 World Cup was the 19th edition of the FIFA U-17 World Cup, the biennial international men's youth football tournament contested by the under-17 national teams of the member associations of FIFA. It was held in Indonesia from 10 November to 2 December 2023. This was the first time that Indonesia hosted a FIFA tournament, the first time that the U-17 World Cup was held in Southeast Asia, and the sixth tournament to take place in an Asian country, after China in 1985, Japan in 1993, South Korea in 2007, the United Arab Emirates in 2013 and India in 2017. It was the third men's FIFA tournament held in Southeast Asia, after the 1997 FIFA World Youth Championship in Malaysia and the 2012 FIFA Futsal World Cup in Thailand and the fourth overall, also the 2004 FIFA U-19 Women's World Championship in Thailand.

This edition marked the return of the tournament after a four-year hiatus due to the COVID-19 pandemic forcing FIFA to cancel the 2021 edition.

Brazil were the defending champions, having won their fourth title in 2019, but were eliminated after losing 3–0 to Argentina in the quarter-finals.

== Host selection ==
Peru were announced as the 2021 U-17 World Cup hosts following a FIFA Council meeting on 24 October 2019 in Shanghai, China.

After the 2021 edition was cancelled, Peru was awarded the hosting rights of the next edition in 2023.

However, after extensive discussions between the Peruvian Football Federation and FIFA on the hosting suitability of Peru caused by its infrastructural deficiencies, Peru withdrew as hosts on 3 April 2023, with FIFA announcing an immediate opening of a replacement hosting rights tender.

On 23 June 2023, FIFA officially appointed Indonesia as the new host, believed to have been in compensation for the loss of the 2023 FIFA U-20 World Cup hosting rights which were given to Argentina on 29 March 2023 after many Indonesian politicians, especially governors of the hosting provinces, boycotted the Israeli team to set foot in that tournament, nine months after the team assured their qualification.

== Venues ==
Chairman of the Football Association of Indonesia (PSSI), Erick Thohir, announced that they would propose eight stadiums to FIFA for hosting the tournament. Six of these stadiums, Gelora Bung Karno Stadium (Jakarta), Gelora Bung Tomo Stadium (Surabaya), Jalak Harupat Stadium (Bandung Regency), Manahan Stadium (Surakarta/Solo), Kapten I Wayan Dipta Stadium (Bali), and Gelora Sriwijaya Stadium (Palembang) were chosen for the 2023 FIFA U-20 World Cup when Indonesia were to be the host. Another two additional stadiums were Jakarta International Stadium and Pakansari Stadium.

Thohir subsequently confirmed that both semi-final and final matches would be played at the Manahan Stadium.

The capacity listed below are the tournament capacity and does not necessarily reflect the maximum capacity of the stadiums.

Surabaya	Jakarta
Gelora Bung Tomo Stadium	Jakarta International Stadium
Capacity: 44,200	Capacity: 23,422
2023 FIFA U-17 World Cup is located in Java
Bandung	Surakarta
Jalak Harupat Stadium	Manahan Stadium
Capacity: 22,700	Capacity: 19,700

== Teams ==
=== Qualification ===
A total of 24 teams qualified for the final tournament. Indonesia, the host team along with 23 other teams qualified from six separate continental competitions.

Confederation	Qualifying tournament	Team	Appearance	Last appearance	Previous best performance
AFC (Asia)	Host nation	Indonesia	1st	N/A	Debut
AFC (Asia)	2023 AFC U-17 Asian Cup	Iran	5th	2017	Quarter-finals (2017)
AFC (Asia)	2023 AFC U-17 Asian Cup	Japan	10th	2019	Quarter-finals (1993, 2011)
AFC (Asia)	2023 AFC U-17 Asian Cup	South Korea	7th	2019	Quarter-finals (1987, 2009, 2019)
AFC (Asia)	2023 AFC U-17 Asian Cup	Uzbekistan	3rd	2013	Quarter-finals (2011)
CAF (Africa)	2023 U-17 Africa Cup of Nations	Burkina Faso	5th	2011	Third place (2001)
CAF (Africa)	2023 U-17 Africa Cup of Nations	Mali	6th	2017	Runners-up (2015)
CAF (Africa)	2023 U-17 Africa Cup of Nations	Morocco	2nd	2013	Round of 16 (2013)
CAF (Africa)	2023 U-17 Africa Cup of Nations	Senegal	2nd	2019	Round of 16 (2019)
CONCACAF (Central, North America and Caribbean)	2023 CONCACAF U-17 Championship	Canada	8th	2019	Group stage (1987, 1989, 1993, 1995, 2011, 2013, 2019)
CONCACAF (Central, North America and Caribbean)	2023 CONCACAF U-17 Championship	Mexico	15th	2019	Champions (2005, 2011)
CONCACAF (Central, North America and Caribbean)	2023 CONCACAF U-17 Championship	Panama	3rd	2013	Round of 16 (2011)
CONCACAF (Central, North America and Caribbean)	2023 CONCACAF U-17 Championship	United States	18th	2019	Fourth place (1999)
CONMEBOL (South America)	2023 South American U-17 Championship	Argentina	15th	2019	Third place (1991, 1995, 2003)
CONMEBOL (South America)	2023 South American U-17 Championship	Brazil	18th	2019	Champions (1997, 1999, 2003, 2019)
CONMEBOL (South America)	2023 South American U-17 Championship	Ecuador	6th	2019	Quarter-finals (1995, 2015)
CONMEBOL (South America)	2023 South American U-17 Championship	Venezuela	2nd	2013	Group stage (2013)
OFC (Oceania)	2023 OFC U-17 Championship	New Caledonia	2nd	2017	Group stage (2017)
OFC (Oceania)	2023 OFC U-17 Championship	New Zealand	10th	2019	Round of 16 (2009, 2011, 2015)
UEFA (Europe)	2023 UEFA European Under-17 Championship	England	5th	2017	Champions (2017)
UEFA (Europe)	2023 UEFA European Under-17 Championship	France	8th	2019	Champions (2001)
UEFA (Europe)	2023 UEFA European Under-17 Championship	Germany	11th	2017	Runners-up (1985) (Note: As West Germany.)
UEFA (Europe)	2023 UEFA European Under-17 Championship	Poland	3rd	1999	Fourth place (1993)
UEFA (Europe)	2023 UEFA European Under-17 Championship	Spain	11th	2019	Runners-up (1991, 2003, 2007, 2017)

=== Squads ===
Players born on or after 1 January 2006 and on or before 31 December 2008 were eligible to compete in the tournament.

=== Seeding ===
The 24 teams were organised to be drawn into six groups of four teams. The hosts Indonesia were automatically seeded to Pot 1 and into the first position of Group A, while the remaining teams were seeded into pots based on their results in the last five FIFA U-17 World Cups (with more recent tournaments weighted more heavily, and with five bonus points added to each of the 6 continental champions from the 2023 qualifying tournaments), as follows:

Pot	Team	Confederation	2011	2013	2015	2017	2019		
Pot	Team	Confederation	Points (20%)	Points (40%)	Points (60%)	Points (80%)	Points (100%)	Bonus (Note: Continental champions bonus points)	Total points
1	Indonesia (H)	AFC	Host nation, automatically assigned to Pot 1						
1	Brazil	CONMEBOL	2.6	5.2	5.4	14.4	21	+5	53.6
1	Mexico	CONCACAF	4.2	5.2	7.8	1.6	11	+5	34.8
1	France	UEFA	1.6	DNQ	6	7.2	18		32.8
1	Spain	UEFA	DNQ	DNQ	DNQ	12	10		22
1	Japan	AFC	2	3.6	DNQ	4	7	+5	21.6
2	Germany	UEFA	3.6	DNQ	3.6	7.2	DNQ	+5	19.4
2	Mali	CAF	DNQ	DNQ	9.6	9.6	DNQ		19.2
2	England	UEFA	1.6	0	1.2	15.2	DNQ		18
2	South Korea	AFC	DNQ	DNQ	4.2	DNQ	9		13.2
2	Argentina	CONMEBOL	0.8	5.2	0	DNQ	7		13
2	Ecuador	CONMEBOL	1.2	DNQ	5.4	DNQ	6		12.6
3	New Zealand	OFC	0.8	0	2.4	0.8	3	+5	12
3	Iran	AFC	DNQ	2	DNQ	9.6	DNQ		11.6
3	Senegal	CAF	DNQ	DNQ	DNQ	DNQ	6	+5	11
3	United States	CONCACAF	0.8	DNQ	0.6	7.2	1		9.6
3	Uzbekistan	AFC	1.8	2.8	DNQ	DNQ	DNQ		4.6
3	Morocco	CAF	DNQ	2.8	DNQ	DNQ	DNQ		2.8
4	Canada	CONCACAF	0.4	0.8	DNQ	DNQ	0		1.2
4	New Caledonia	OFC	DNQ	DNQ	DNQ	0.8	DNQ		0.8
4	Panama	CONCACAF	0.6	0	DNQ	DNQ	DNQ		0.6
4	Venezuela	CONMEBOL	DNQ	0	DNQ	DNQ	DNQ		0
4	Burkina Faso	CAF	0	DNQ	DNQ	DNQ	DNQ		0
4	Poland	UEFA	DNQ	DNQ	DNQ	DNQ	DNQ		0

=== Draw ===
The draw took place at 16:00 CEST (21:00 WIB host time) on 15 September 2023 at FIFA headquarters in Zürich, Switzerland. The ceremony was presented by Mollie Kmita and conducted by FIFA Director of Tournaments Jaime Yarza, with the former footballers Júlio César, from Brazil, and Stephen Appiah, from Ghana, acting as draw assistants.

The draw started with teams from pot one being drawn first and placed in the first position of their groups (hosts Indonesia automatically assigned to A1). Then were drawn the teams from pot 2, followed by pot 3 and pot 4, with each team also drawn to one of the positions within their group; no group could contain more than one team from each confederation.

The draw resulted in the following groups:

Group A
Pos	Team
A1	Indonesia
A2	Ecuador
A3	Panama
A4	Morocco

Group B
Pos	Team
B1	Spain
B2	Canada
B3	Mali
B4	Uzbekistan

Group C
Pos	Team
C1	Brazil
C2	Iran
C3	New Caledonia
C4	England

Group D
Pos	Team
D1	Japan
D2	Poland
D3	Argentina
D4	Senegal

Group E
Pos	Team
E1	France
E2	Burkina Faso
E3	South Korea
E4	United States

Group F
Pos	Team
F1	Mexico
F2	Germany
F3	Venezuela
F4	New Zealand

== Match officials ==
A total of 18 refereeing trios (a referee and two assistant referees), 3 support referees, and 18 video assistant referees were appointed for the tournament. No match officials from OFC.

Confederation	Referee	Assistant referees	Video assistant referees
AFC	(United Arab Emirates) Omar Al Ali	(United Arab Emirates) Jasem Al Ali (United Arab Emirates) Saeed Rashed Al-Marzooqi	(Saudi Arabia) Khalid Al-Turais (Australia) Kate Jacewicz (Kuwait) Abdullah Jamali
AFC	(China) Fu Ming	(China) Cao Yi (China) Ma Ji	(Saudi Arabia) Khalid Al-Turais (Australia) Kate Jacewicz (Kuwait) Abdullah Jamali
AFC	(South Korea) Ko Hyung-jin	(South Korea) Yoon Jae-yeol (South Korea) Park Sang-jun	(Saudi Arabia) Khalid Al-Turais (Australia) Kate Jacewicz (Kuwait) Abdullah Jamali
CAF	(Gabon) Pierre Atcho	(Gabon) Boris Ditsoga (Cameroon) Carine Atezambong Fomo	(Algeria) Lahlou Benbraham (Ghana) Daniel Nii Laryea
CAF	(Mauritania) Dahane Beida	(Madagascar) Dimbiniaina Andriatianarivelo (Togo) Jonathan Ahonto Koffi	(Algeria) Lahlou Benbraham (Ghana) Daniel Nii Laryea
CAF	(Libya) Mutaz Ibrahim	(Tunisia) Khalil Hassani (Egypt) Ahmed Hossan Eldin	(Algeria) Lahlou Benbraham (Ghana) Daniel Nii Laryea
CONCACAF	(Honduras) Selvin Brown	(Honduras) Gerson Martínez (Honduras) Roney Valladares	(El Salvador) Ismael Cornejo (United States) Joe Dickerson (Nicaragua) Tatiana Guzmán
CONCACAF	(Costa Rica) Keylor Herrera	(Costa Rica) William Chow (Costa Rica) Victor Ramírez Fonseca	(El Salvador) Ismael Cornejo (United States) Joe Dickerson (Nicaragua) Tatiana Guzmán
CONCACAF	(Guatemala) Bryan López	(Guatemala) Luis Ventura (Guatemala) Humberto Panjoj	(El Salvador) Ismael Cornejo (United States) Joe Dickerson (Nicaragua) Tatiana Guzmán
CONMEBOL	(Ecuador) Augusto Aragón	(Ecuador) Ricardo Baren (Ecuador) Andrés Tola	(Brazil) Igor Benevenuto (Chile) Ricardo Molina (Paraguay) Derlis López (Colombia) Jhon Perdomo
CONMEBOL	(Bolivia) Ivo Méndez	(Bolivia) Carlos Tapia (Bolivia) Roger Orellana	(Brazil) Igor Benevenuto (Chile) Ricardo Molina (Paraguay) Derlis López (Colombia) Jhon Perdomo
CONMEBOL	(Peru) Roberto Pérez	(Peru) Alberto García (Peru) Enrique Pinto	(Brazil) Igor Benevenuto (Chile) Ricardo Molina (Paraguay) Derlis López (Colombia) Jhon Perdomo
CONMEBOL	(Uruguay) Gustavo Tejera	(Uruguay) Carlos Barreiro (Uruguay) Andrés Nievas	(Brazil) Igor Benevenuto (Chile) Ricardo Molina (Paraguay) Derlis López (Colombia) Jhon Perdomo
OFC	No match officials		
UEFA	(Norway) Espen Eskås	(Norway) Jan Erik Engan (Norway) Isaak Bashevkin	(England) David Coote (Italy) Aleandro Di Paolo (Netherlands) Rob Dieperink (Greece) Angelos Evangelou (Switzerland) Fedayi San (Bulgaria) Ivaylo Stoyanov
UEFA	(Denmark) Morten Krogh	(Denmark) Dennis Rasmussen (Denmark) Steffen Bramsen	(England) David Coote (Italy) Aleandro Di Paolo (Netherlands) Rob Dieperink (Greece) Angelos Evangelou (Switzerland) Fedayi San (Bulgaria) Ivaylo Stoyanov
UEFA	(Turkey) Atilla Karaoğlan	(Turkey) Ceyhun Sesigüzel (Turkey) Cevdet Kömürcüoglu	(England) David Coote (Italy) Aleandro Di Paolo (Netherlands) Rob Dieperink (Greece) Angelos Evangelou (Switzerland) Fedayi San (Bulgaria) Ivaylo Stoyanov
UEFA	(Slovenia) Rade Obrenovič	(Slovenia) Jure Praprotnik (Slovenia) Grega Kordež	(England) David Coote (Italy) Aleandro Di Paolo (Netherlands) Rob Dieperink (Greece) Angelos Evangelou (Switzerland) Fedayi San (Bulgaria) Ivaylo Stoyanov
UEFA	(Portugal) João Pinheiro	(Portugal) Bruno Jesus (Portugal) Luciano Maia	(England) David Coote (Italy) Aleandro Di Paolo (Netherlands) Rob Dieperink (Greece) Angelos Evangelou (Switzerland) Fedayi San (Bulgaria) Ivaylo Stoyanov

Confederation	Support referees
AFC	(Indonesia) Aprisman Aranda (Indonesia) Thoriq Alkatiri (Indonesia) Yudi Nurcahya

== Opening ceremony ==
The opening ceremony took place on 10 November 2023 at the Gelora Bung Tomo Stadium in Surabaya, preceding the Group A match between Indonesia and Ecuador. It featured performances from Indonesian singers Wika Salim and Aurélie Moeremans.

== Group stage ==
The top two teams of each group and the four best third-placed teams advanced to the round of 16.

All times are local, WIB (UTC+7).

=== Tiebreakers ===
The ranking of teams in the group stage was determined as follows:

1. Points obtained in all group matches (three points for a win, one for a draw, none for a defeat);
2. Goal difference in all group matches;
3. Number of goals scored in all group matches;
4. Points obtained in the matches played between the teams in question;
5. Goal difference in the matches played between the teams in question;
6. Number of goals scored in the matches played between the teams in question;
7. Fair play points in all group matches (only one deduction could be applied to a player in a single match):
  - Yellow card: −1 points;
  - Indirect red card (second yellow card): −3 points;
  - Direct red card: −4 points;
  - Yellow card and direct red card: −5 points;
8. Drawing of lots.

=== Group A ===
Pos	Team	Pld	W	D	L	GF	GA	GD	Pts	Qualification
1	Morocco	3	2	0	1	5	3	+2	6	Knockout stage
2	Ecuador	3	1	2	0	4	2	+2	5	Knockout stage
3	Indonesia (H)	3	0	2	1	3	5	−2	2	
4	Panama	3	0	2	1	2	4	−2	2	

Source: FIFA
(H) Hosts
10 November 2023
16:00

Panama	0–2	Morocco
	Report	Chlaghmo 16'; Ennair 90+5'

Gelora Bung Tomo Stadium, Surabaya
Attendance: 13,437
Referee: João Pinheiro (Portugal)
10 November 2023
19:00

Indonesia	1–1	Ecuador
Arkhan 22'	Report	Obando 28'

Gelora Bung Tomo Stadium, Surabaya
Attendance: 30,583
Referee: Espen Eskås (Norway)

13 November 2023
16:00

Morocco	0–2	Ecuador
	Report	Bermúdez 62' (pen.), 90+3'

Gelora Bung Tomo Stadium, Surabaya
Attendance: 5,498
Referee: Keylor Herrera (Costa Rica)
13 November 2023
19:00

Indonesia	1–1	Panama
Arkhan 54'	Report	Castillo 45+3'

Gelora Bung Tomo Stadium, Surabaya
Attendance: 17,239
Referee: Rade Obrenovič (Slovenia)

16 November 2023
19:00

Morocco	3–1	Indonesia
Alaoui 29' (pen.); Aït Boudlal 39'; Hamony 64'	Report	Nabil 42'

Gelora Bung Tomo Stadium, Surabaya
Attendance: 26,454
Referee: Morten Krogh (Denmark)
16 November 2023
19:00

Ecuador	1–1	Panama
Ruiz 24'	Report	Castillo 79'

Manahan Stadium, Surakarta
Attendance: 7,956
Referee: Fu Ming (China)

=== Group B ===
Pos	Team	Pld	W	D	L	GF	GA	GD	Pts	Qualification
1	Spain	3	2	1	0	5	2	+3	7	Knockout stage
2	Mali	3	2	0	1	8	2	+6	6	Knockout stage
3	Uzbekistan	3	1	1	1	5	5	0	4	Knockout stage
4	Canada	3	0	0	3	1	10	−9	0	

Source: FIFA
10 November 2023
16:00

Mali	3–0	Uzbekistan
M. Doumbia 30', 72' (pen.), 75'	Report

Manahan Stadium, Surakarta
Attendance: 3,014
Referee: Gustavo Tejera (Uruguay)
10 November 2023
19:00

Spain	2–0	Canada
Guiu 21'; Junyent 76'	Report

Manahan Stadium, Surakarta
Attendance: 6,613
Referee: Roberto Pérez (Peru)

13 November 2023
16:00

Spain	1–0	Mali
Hernández 62'	Report

Manahan Stadium, Surakarta
Attendance: 4,723
Referee: Bryan López (Guatemala)
13 November 2023
19:00

Uzbekistan	3–0	Canada
Chukwu 22' (o.g.); Saidov 24', 81'	Report

Manahan Stadium, Surakarta
Attendance: 6,919
Referee: Ivo Méndez (Bolivia)

16 November 2023
16:00

Uzbekistan	2–2	Spain
Shukurullayev 45+4'; Saidov 54'	Report	Oyono 10'; Martín 19'

Manahan Stadium, Surakarta
Attendance: 5,554
Referee: Augusto Aragón (Ecuador)
16 November 2023
16:00

Canada	1–5	Mali
Chukwu 45'	Report	I. Diarra 14'; Barry 26'; Kanate 73'; Makalou 77'; Thiero 90+1'

Gelora Bung Tomo Stadium, Surabaya
Attendance: 10,269
Referee: Espen Eskås (Norway)

=== Group C ===
Pos	Team	Pld	W	D	L	GF	GA	GD	Pts	Qualification
1	England	3	2	0	1	13	3	+10	6	Knockout stage
2	Brazil	3	2	0	1	13	4	+9	6	Knockout stage
3	Iran	3	2	0	1	9	4	+5	6	Knockout stage
4	New Caledonia	3	0	0	3	0	24	−24	0	

Source: FIFA
11 November 2023
16:00

New Caledonia	0–10	England
	Report	Russell-Denny 16' (pen.); Oboavwoduo 30', 57'; Dibling 35'; Acheampong 45+4'; Amo-Ameyaw 51'; Nwaneri 78'; Hanye 80' (o.g.); Murray-Campbell 85'; McAllister 90+1'

Jakarta International Stadium, Jakarta
Attendance: 6,684
Referee: Ko Hyung-jin (South Korea)
11 November 2023
19:00

Brazil	2–3	Iran
Rayan 28'; Zamani 45+2' (o.g.)	Report	Barajeh 54'; Taheri 69'; Gholizadeh 73'

Jakarta International Stadium, Jakarta
Attendance: 9,283
Referee: Selvin Brown (Honduras)

14 November 2023
16:00

Brazil	9–0	New Caledonia
Rayan 28', 51' (pen.); Estêvão 39'; Luighi 44'; Kauã Elias 46', 86', 90+4'; Vitor Reis 56'; João Victor 61'	Report

Jakarta International Stadium, Jakarta
Attendance: 4,529
Referee: Pierre Atcho (Gabon)
14 November 2023
19:00

England	2–1	Iran
Russell-Denny 63'; Ndala 90'	Report	Zamani 31'

Jakarta International Stadium, Jakarta
Attendance: 7,698
Referee: Gustavo Tejera (Uruguay)

17 November 2023
19:00

England	1–2	Brazil
Ndala 71' (pen.)	Report	Kauã Elias 43'; Da Mata 54'

Jakarta International Stadium, Jakarta
Attendance: 15,171
Referee: Bryan López (Guatemala)
17 November 2023
19:00

Iran	5–0	New Caledonia
Razzaghinia 17', 34'; Ghandipour 76'; Askari 90+6'; Taheri 90+8'	Report

Jalak Harupat Stadium, Bandung
Attendance: 6,762
Referee: Ivo Méndez (Bolivia)

=== Group D ===
Pos	Team	Pld	W	D	L	GF	GA	GD	Pts	Qualification
1	Argentina	3	2	0	1	8	3	+5	6	Knockout stage
2	Senegal	3	2	0	1	6	4	+2	6	Knockout stage
3	Japan	3	2	0	1	4	3	+1	6	Knockout stage
4	Poland	3	0	0	3	1	9	−8	0	

Source: FIFA
11 November 2023
16:00

Japan	1–0	Poland
Takaoka 76'	Report

Jalak Harupat Stadium, Bandung
Attendance: 4,961
Referee: Pierre Atcho (Gabon)
11 November 2023
19:00

Argentina	1–2	Senegal
Ruberto 90+2'	Report	A. Diouf 6', 38'

Jalak Harupat Stadium, Bandung
Attendance: 6,222
Referee: Atilla Karaoğlan (Turkey)

14 November 2023
16:00

Senegal	4–1	Poland
Gueye 18', 52', 69'; Szala 30' (o.g.)	Report	Reguła 66'

Jalak Harupat Stadium, Bandung
Attendance: 7,065
Referee: Omar Al-Ali (United Arab Emirates)
14 November 2023
19:30 (Note: The match, originally scheduled for 19:00 local time, was delayed 30 minutes to prevent overlap with the other Group D match between Senegal and Poland, which had been delayed due to rain.)

Japan	1–3	Argentina
Takaoka 50'	Report	Echeverri 5'; Acuña 8'; Ruberto 90+9'

Jalak Harupat Stadium, Bandung
Attendance: 12,324
Referee: João Pinheiro (Portugal)

17 November 2023
16:00

Senegal	0–2	Japan
	Report	Takaoka 62', 72'

Jalak Harupat Stadium, Bandung
Attendance: 5,079
Referee: Rade Obrenovič (Slovenia)
17 November 2023
16:00

Poland	0–4	Argentina
	Report	Laplace 34'; Ruberto 46'; Subiabre 52'; López 86'

Jakarta International Stadium, Jakarta
Attendance: 7,663
Referee: Keylor Herrera (Costa Rica)

=== Group E ===
Pos	Team	Pld	W	D	L	GF	GA	GD	Pts	Qualification
1	France	3	3	0	0	7	0	+7	9	Knockout stage
2	United States	3	2	0	1	5	5	0	6	Knockout stage
3	Burkina Faso	3	1	0	2	3	6	−3	3	
4	South Korea	3	0	0	3	2	6	−4	0	

Source: FIFA
12 November 2023
16:00

France	3–0	Burkina Faso
Lambourde 49'; Tincres 81' (pen.); Gomis 87' (pen.)	Report

Jakarta International Stadium, Jakarta
Attendance: 7,033
Referee: Fu Ming (China)
12 November 2023
19:00

South Korea	1–3	United States
Kim Myeong-jun 35'	Report	Berchimas 7', 73'; Medina 49'

Jakarta International Stadium, Jakarta
Attendance: 4,317
Referee: Morten Krogh (Denmark)

15 November 2023
16:00

United States	2–1	Burkina Faso
Figueroa 45'; Berchimas 45+6'	Report	Diarra 89'

Jakarta International Stadium, Jakarta
Attendance: 3,235
Referee: Roberto Pérez (Peru)
15 November 2023
19:00

France	1–0	South Korea
Amougou 2'	Report

Jakarta International Stadium, Jakarta
Attendance: 7,476
Referee: Mutaz Ibrahim (Libya)

18 November 2023
19:00

United States	0–3	France
	Report	Tincres 45+2', 82'; Meupiyou 86'

Jakarta International Stadium, Jakarta
Attendance: 14,436
Referee: Dahane Beida (Mauritania)
18 November 2023
19:00

Burkina Faso	2–1	South Korea
Diarra 24'; A. Camara 86'	Report	Kim Myeong-jun 49'

Jalak Harupat Stadium, Bandung
Attendance: 3,400
Referee: Selvin Brown (Honduras)

=== Group F ===
Pos	Team	Pld	W	D	L	GF	GA	GD	Pts	Qualification
1	Germany	3	3	0	0	9	2	+7	9	Knockout stage
2	Mexico	3	1	1	1	7	5	+2	4	Knockout stage
3	Venezuela	3	1	1	1	5	5	0	4	Knockout stage
4	New Zealand	3	0	0	3	1	10	−9	0	

Source: FIFA
12 November 2023
16:00

Venezuela	3–0	New Zealand
Martínez 29'; Romero 87', 90+7'	Report

Jalak Harupat Stadium, Bandung
Attendance: 2,932
Referee: Mutaz Ibrahim (Libya)
12 November 2023
19:00

Mexico	1–3	Germany
Jiménez 75'	Report	Darvich 29'; Moerstedt 38'; Da Silva Moreira 53'

Jalak Harupat Stadium, Bandung
Attendance: 4,617
Referee: Augusto Aragón (Ecuador)

15 November 2023
16:00

Mexico	2–2	Venezuela
Carrillo 62'; Ortiz 67'	Report	Cichero 6'; Profeta 84' (pen.)

Jalak Harupat Stadium, Bandung
Attendance: 2,460
Referee: Atilla Karaoğlan (Turkey)
15 November 2023
19:00

New Zealand	1–3	Germany
Watson 90+1' (pen.)	Report	Brunner 45+7'; Moerstedt 60'; Yalçınkaya 81'

Jalak Harupat Stadium, Bandung
Attendance: 5,353
Referee: Dahane Beida (Mauritania)

18 November 2023
16:45 (Note: The match, originally scheduled for 16:00 local time, was delayed 45 minutes due to rain.)

New Zealand	0–4	Mexico
	Report	Barajas 42'; Fernández de Lara 47'; Carrillo 54', 67' (pen.)

Jalak Harupat Stadium, Bandung
Attendance: 6,136
Referee: Omar Al-Ali (United Arab Emirates)
18 November 2023
16:00

Germany	3–0	Venezuela
Ramsak 1', 57'; Da Silva Moreira 42'	Report

Jakarta International Stadium, Jakarta
Attendance: 11,264
Referee: Ko Hyung-jin (South Korea)

=== Ranking of third-placed teams ===
The four best third-placed teams from the six groups advanced to the knockout stage along with the six group winners and six runners-up.

Pos	Grp	Team	Pld	W	D	L	GF	GA	GD	Pts	Qualification
1	C	Iran	3	2	0	1	9	4	+5	6	Knockout stage
2	D	Japan	3	2	0	1	4	3	+1	6	Knockout stage
3	B	Uzbekistan	3	1	1	1	5	5	0	4 (Note: Fair play points: Uzbekistan 0, Venezuela –4.)	Knockout stage
4	F	Venezuela	3	1	1	1	5	5	0	4	Knockout stage
5	E	Burkina Faso	3	1	0	2	3	6	−3	3	
6	A	Indonesia (H)	3	0	2	1	3	5	−2	2	

Source: FIFA
Rules for classification: 1) Points; 2) Goal difference; 3) Goals scored; 4) Fair play points; 5) Drawing of lots.
(H) Hosts

== Knockout stage ==
In the knockout stage, if a match was level at the end of 90 minutes of normal playing time, the match would be directly decided by a penalty shoot-out to determine the winner; no extra time would be played.

In the round of 16, the four third-placed teams were matched with the winners of groups A, B, C, and D. The specific match-ups involving the third-placed teams depended on the four third-placed teams which qualified for the round of 16:

Combination according to the four qualified teams

Third-placed teams qualified from groups						1A vs	1B vs	1C vs	1D vs
A	B	C	D			3C	3D	3A	3B
A	B	C		E		3C	3A	3B	3E
A	B	C			F	3C	3A	3B	3F
A	B		D	E		3D	3A	3B	3E
A	B		D		F	3D	3A	3B	3F
A	B			E	F	3E	3A	3B	3F
A		C	D	E		3C	3D	3A	3E
A		C	D		F	3C	3D	3A	3F
A		C		E	F	3C	3A	3F	3E
A			D	E	F	3D	3A	3F	3E
	B	C	D	E		3C	3D	3B	3E
	B	C	D		F	3C	3D	3B	3F
	B	C		E	F	3E	3C	3B	3F
	B		D	E	F	3E	3D	3B	3F
		C	D	E	F	3C	3D	3F	3E

=== Bracket ===
Round of 16
20 November – Surakarta
Ecuador	1
Brazil	3
21 November – Bandung
Argentina	5
Venezuela	0
20 November – Surakarta
Spain	2
Japan	1
21 November – Bandung
Germany	3
United States	2
22 November – Jakarta
France (p)	0 (5)
Senegal	0 (3)
22 November – Jakarta
England	1
Uzbekistan	2
21 November – Surabaya
Mali	5
Mexico	0
21 November – Surabaya
Morocco (p)	1 (4)
Iran	1 (1)

Quarter-finals
24 November – Jakarta
Brazil	0
Argentina	3
24 November – Jakarta
Spain	0
Germany	1
25 November – Surakarta
France	1
Uzbekistan	0
25 November – Surakarta
Mali	1
Morocco	0

Semi-finals
28 November – Surakarta
Argentina	3 (2)
Germany (p)	3 (4)
28 November – Surakarta
France	2
Mali	1

Final
2 December – Surakarta
Germany (p)	2 (4)
France	2 (3)
Third place play-off
1 December – Surakarta
Argentina	0
Mali	3

=== Round of 16 ===
20 November 2023
15:30

Ecuador	1–3	Brazil
Bermúdez 45+4'	Report	Estêvão 14', 70'; Luighi 90'

Manahan Stadium, Surakarta
Attendance: 3,580
Referee: Atilla Karaoğlan (Turkey)

20 November 2023
19:00

Spain	2–1	Japan
Junyent 8'; Guiu 74'	Report	Nawata 40'

Manahan Stadium, Surakarta
Attendance: 8,587
Referee: Pierre Atcho (Gabon)

21 November 2023
15:30

Mali	5–0	Mexico
Barry 9', 13'; I. Diarra 15'; Kanate 37' (pen.); Tia 50'	Report

Gelora Bung Tomo Stadium, Surabaya
Attendance: 7,034
Referee: Gustavo Tejera (Uruguay)

21 November 2023
15:30

Germany	3–2	United States
Herrmann 14'; Moerstedt 34'; Yalçınkaya 87'	Report	Habroune 24'; Vazquez 80'

Si Jalak Harupat Stadium, Bandung
Attendance: 5,782
Referee: Fu Ming (China)

21 November 2023
19:00

Argentina	5–0	Venezuela
Balbo 15' (o.g.); López 22'; Echeverri 32'; Ruberto 70' (pen.), 79'	Report

Si Jalak Harupat Stadium, Bandung
Attendance: 6,187
Referee: Morten Krogh (Denmark)

21 November 2023
19:00

Morocco	1–1	Iran
Azaouzi 90+4'	Report	Gholizadeh 73'
Penalties
Ouazane (penalty scored); Azaouzi (penalty scored); Nazih (penalty scored); Zahouani (penalty scored)	4–1	(penalty scored) Darvishaali; (penalty missed) Nafari; (penalty missed) Taheri

Gelora Bung Tomo Stadium, Surabaya
Attendance: 1,552
Referee: João Pinheiro (Portugal)

22 November 2023
15:30

England	1–2	Uzbekistan
Ndala 35'	Report	Saidov 4'; Mirzaev 67'

Jakarta International Stadium, Jakarta
Attendance: 7,014
Referee: Selvin Brown (Honduras)

22 November 2023
19:00

France	0–0	Senegal
	Report
Penalties
Kayi Sanda (penalty scored); Zague (penalty scored); Tincres (penalty scored); Meupiyou (penalty scored); Sangui (penalty scored)	5–3	(penalty scored) Gueye; (penalty missed) Diong; (penalty scored) Dorival; (penalty scored) Sawane

Jakarta International Stadium, Jakarta
Attendance: 12,238
Referee: Roberto Pérez (Peru)

=== Quarter-finals ===
24 November 2023
15:30

Spain	0–1	Germany
	Report	Brunner 64' (pen.)

Jakarta International Stadium, Jakarta
Attendance: 8,379
Referee: Omar Al-Ali (United Arab Emirates)

24 November 2023
19:30 (Note: The match, originally scheduled for 19:00 local time, was delayed 30 minutes due to rain.)

Brazil	0–3	Argentina
	Report	Echeverri 28', 58', 71'

Jakarta International Stadium, Jakarta
Attendance: 14,597
Referee: Espen Eskås (Norway)

25 November 2023
15:30

France	1–0	Uzbekistan
Bouneb 83'	Report

Manahan Stadium, Surakarta
Attendance: 5,201
Referee: Dahane Beida (Mauritania)

25 November 2023
19:00

Mali	1–0	Morocco
I. Diarra 81'	Report

Manahan Stadium, Surakarta
Attendance: 8,589
Referee: Augusto Aragón (Ecuador)

=== Semi-finals ===
28 November 2023
15:30

Argentina	3–3	Germany
Ruberto 36', 45+4', 90+7'	Report	Brunner 9', 58'; Moerstedt 69'
Penalties
Mastantuono (penalty missed); Echeverri (penalty missed); Giménez (penalty scored); Villalba (penalty scored)	2–4	(penalty scored) Da Silva Moreira; (penalty scored) Ramsak; (penalty missed) Jeltsch; (penalty scored) Harchaoui; (penalty scored) Brunner

Manahan Stadium, Surakarta
Attendance: 8,525
Referee: João Pinheiro (Portugal)

28 November 2023
19:00

France	2–1	Mali
Titi 56'; Bouneb 69'	Report	I. Diarra 45+4'

Manahan Stadium, Surakarta
Attendance: 12,013
Referee: Gustavo Tejera (Uruguay)

=== Third place play-off ===
1 December 2023
19:00

Argentina	0–3	Mali
	Report	I. Diarra 9'; M. Doumbia 45'; Makalou 48'

Manahan Stadium, Surakarta
Attendance: 10,901
Referee: Fu Ming (China)

=== Final ===
2 December 2023
19:00

Germany	2–2	France
Brunner 29' (pen.); Darvich 51'	Report	Bouabré 53'; Amougou 85'
Penalties
Da Silva Moreira (penalty missed); Ramsak (penalty scored); Moerstedt (penalty scored); Harchaoui (penalty scored); Brunner (penalty missed); Kabar (penalty scored)	4–3	(penalty scored) Kayi Sanda; (penalty scored) Bouneb; (penalty missed) Sangui; (penalty missed) Meupiyou; (penalty scored) Tincres; (penalty missed) Gomis

Manahan Stadium, Surakarta
Attendance: 13,037
Referee: Espen Eskås (Norway)

== Awards ==
The following awards were given at the conclusion of the tournament. They were all sponsored by Adidas, except for the FIFA Fair Play Trophy.

Golden Ball	Silver Ball	Bronze Ball
(Germany) Paris Brunner	(Mali) Hamidou Makalou	(France) Mathis Amougou
Golden Boot	Silver Boot	Bronze Boot
(Argentina) Agustín Ruberto (8 goals, 1 assist, 607 minutes played)	(Mali) Ibrahim Diarra (5 goals, 4 assists, 566 minutes played)	(Argentina) Claudio Echeverri (5 goals, 2 assists, 498 minutes played)
Golden Glove
(France) Paul Argney
FIFA Fair Play Trophy
England

== Final ranking ==
As per statistical convention in football, matches decided in extra time are counted as wins and losses, while matches decided by penalty shoot-outs are counted as draws.

Pos	Team	Pld	W	D	L	GF	GA	GD	Pts	Final result
1	Germany	7	5	2	0	18	9	+9	17	Champions
2	France	7	5	2	0	12	3	+9	17	Runners-up
3	Mali	7	5	0	2	18	4	+14	15	Third place
4	Argentina	7	4	1	2	19	9	+10	13	Fourth place
5	Spain	5	3	1	1	7	4	+3	10	Eliminated in Quarter-finals
6	Brazil	5	3	0	2	16	8	+8	9	Eliminated in Quarter-finals
7	Morocco	5	2	1	2	6	5	+1	7	Eliminated in Quarter-finals
8	Uzbekistan	5	2	1	2	7	7	0	7	Eliminated in Quarter-finals
9	Iran	4	2	1	1	10	5	+5	7	Eliminated in Round of 16
10	Senegal	4	2	1	1	6	4	+2	7	Eliminated in Round of 16
11	England	4	2	0	2	14	5	+9	6	Eliminated in Round of 16
12	Japan	4	2	0	2	5	5	0	6	Eliminated in Round of 16
13	United States	4	2	0	2	7	8	−1	6	Eliminated in Round of 16
14	Ecuador	4	1	2	1	5	5	0	5	Eliminated in Round of 16
15	Mexico	4	1	1	2	7	10	−3	4	Eliminated in Round of 16
16	Venezuela	4	1	1	2	5	10	−5	4	Eliminated in Round of 16
17	Burkina Faso	3	1	0	2	3	6	−3	3	Eliminated in Group stage
18	Indonesia	3	0	2	1	3	5	−2	2	Eliminated in Group stage
19	Panama	3	0	2	1	2	4	−2	2	Eliminated in Group stage
20	South Korea	3	0	0	3	2	6	−4	0	Eliminated in Group stage
21	Poland	3	0	0	3	1	9	−8	0	Eliminated in Group stage
22	Canada	3	0	0	3	1	10	−9	0	Eliminated in Group stage
23	New Zealand	3	0	0	3	1	10	−9	0	Eliminated in Group stage
24	New Caledonia	3	0	0	3	0	24	−24	0	Eliminated in Group stage

== Goalscorers ==
There were 175 goals scored in 52 matches, for an average of 3.37 goals per match.

8 goals

- (Argentina) Agustín Ruberto

5 goals

- (Argentina) Claudio Echeverri
- (Mali) Ibrahim Diarra
- (Germany) Paris Brunner

4 goals

- (Brazil) Kauã Elias
- (Germany) Max Moerstedt
- (Japan) Rento Takaoka
- (Mali) Mamadou Doumbia
- (Uzbekistan) Amir Saidov

3 goals

- (Brazil) Estêvão
- (Brazil) Rayan
- (Ecuador) Michael Bermúdez
- (England) Joel Ndala
- (France) Joan Tincres
- (Mali) Mahamoud Barry
- (Mexico) Stephano Carrillo
- (Senegal) Idrissa Gueye
- (United States) Nimfasha Berchimas

2 goals

- (Argentina) Santiago López
- (Brazil) Luighi
- (Burkina Faso) Jack Diarra
- (England) Justin Oboavwoduo
- (England) Reiss-Alexander Russell-Denny
- (France) Ismail Bouneb
- (France) Mathis Amougou
- (Germany) Eric da Silva Moreira
- (Germany) Robert Ramsak
- (Germany) Bilal Yalçınkaya
- (Germany) Noah Darvich
- (Indonesia) Arkhan Kaka
- (Iran) Esmaeil Gholizadeh
- (Iran) Amir Razzaghinia
- (Iran) Kasra Taheri
- (Mali) Ibrahim Kanate
- (Mali) Hamidou Makalou
- (Panama) Oldemar Castillo
- (Senegal) Amara Diouf
- (South Korea) Kim Myeong-jun
- (Spain) Marc Guiu
- (Spain) Quim Junyent
- (Venezuela) Leenhan Romero

1 goal

- (Argentina) Valentino Acuña
- (Argentina) Thiago Laplace
- (Argentina) Ian Subiabre
- (Brazil) Da Mata
- (Brazil) João Victor
- (Brazil) Vitor Reis
- (Burkina Faso) Aboubacar Camara
- (Canada) Richard Chukwu
- (Ecuador) Allen Obando
- (Ecuador) Elkin Ruiz
- (England) Josh Acheampong
- (England) Sam Amo-Ameyaw
- (England) Tyler Dibling
- (England) Finley McAllister
- (England) Harrison Murray-Campbell
- (England) Ethan Nwaneri
- (France) Tidiam Gomis
- (France) Mathis Lambourde
- (France) Bastien Meupiyou
- (France) Yvann Titi
- (France) Saïmon Bouabré
- (Germany) Charles Herrmann
- (Indonesia) Nabil Asyura
- (Iran) Mohammad Askari
- (Iran) Yaghoob Barajeh
- (Iran) Reza Ghandipour
- (Iran) Abolfazl Zamani
- (Japan) Gaku Nawata
- (Mali) Ousmane Thiero
- (Mali) Ange Tia
- (Mexico) Fidel Barajas
- (Mexico) Adrián Fernández de Lara
- (Mexico) Tahiel Jiménez
- (Mexico) Luis Ortiz
- (Morocco) Nassim Azaouzi
- (Morocco) Abdelhamid Aït Boudlal
- (Morocco) Anas Alaoui
- (Morocco) Saifdine Chlaghmo
- (Morocco) Ayman Ennair
- (Morocco) Mohamed Hamony
- (New Zealand) Adam Watson
- (Poland) Marcel Reguła
- (Spain) Juan Hernández
- (Spain) Roberto Martín
- (Spain) Igor Oyono
- (United States) Keyrol Figueroa
- (United States) Taha Habroune
- (United States) Cruz Medina
- (United States) David Vasquez
- (Uzbekistan) Lazizbek Mirzaev
- (Uzbekistan) Behruz Shukurullayev
- (Venezuela) Alejandro Cichero
- (Venezuela) David Martínez
- (Venezuela) Nicola Profeta

1 own goal

- (Canada) Richard Chukwu (against Uzbekistan)
- (Iran) Abolfazl Zamani (against Brazil)
- (New Caledonia) Wadria Hanye (against England)
- (Poland) Dominik Szala (against Senegal)
- (Venezuela) Luis Balbo (against Argentina)

Source: FIFA

== Marketing ==
=== Logo ===
The tournament's logo was revealed on FIFA+ on 1 September 2023. The design uses red and white inspired from the flag of Indonesia, as well as turquoise to symbolize the sea that flows through the archipelago. The crown features a ball which represents the passion for football around the world.

=== Sponsorships ===
FIFA partners	National Supporters
Adidas; Coca-Cola (Sprite); Hyundai; Qatar Airways; Visa; Wanda Group	Amartha; Bank Rakyat Indonesia (BRImo); Indika Energy; Pertamina; Perusahaan Listrik Negara (PLN); Telkomsel

== Symbols ==
=== Mascot ===
The mascot of the 2023 FIFA U17 World Cup in this edition, named Bacuya, played an important role in inviting people to come to the stadium to see the world's young footballers compete. Bacuya, or Badak Cula Cahaya. The horned rhino refers to an animal native to Indonesia. Bacuya appeared wearing a red and white Indonesian national team jersey.

Bacuya's philosophy is that of a young Javan rhinoceros who is very shy and reserved. Despite these characteristics, his curiosity compels him to run stoically into the field as if in search of something. Shades of green grass motivate him until he finds a ball. When something suddenly extraordinary happens, his horns light up with new colors.

=== Music ===
After previously "Glorious" became the official song for the 2023 FIFA U-20 World Cup, this song by the EDM music group from Indonesia named Weird Genius is again the official song for the 2023 FIFA U-17 World Cup. With new arrangements, this song also features three Indonesian soloists; Lyodra Ginting, Tiara Andini, and Ziva Magnolya (LTZ).

== Broadcasting ==
- United States: Fox Sports, Telemundo, Universo
- Indonesia: Emtek
- Albania: RTSH
- Poland: TVP Sport
- Canada: TSN, RDS
- Argentina: TyC Sports
- New Zealand: Sky Sport
- Japan: BS Fuji, J Sports
- Senegal: RTS1 (Senegal team matches only)
- Brazil: SporTV, CazéTV
- Indian subcontinent: Sports18
- France : L'Equipe
