= Emanuel Moreira =

Portuguese footballer (born 2003)

Personal information
- Full name: Emanuel Moreira Fernandes
- Date of birth: 23 March 2003 (age 23)
- Place of birth: Lisbon, Portugal
- Height: 1.90 m (6 ft 3 in)
- Position: Centre-back

Team information
- Current team: Santa Clara
- Number: 21

Youth career
- 2011–2012: Sporting CP
- 2012–2015: Sacavenense
- 2015–2024: Sporting CP

Senior career*
| Years | Team | Apps | (Gls) |
| 2024–2026 | Feirense | 47 | (3) |
| 2026– | Santa Clara | 8 | (0) |

International career
| 2021 | Portugal U19 | 1 | (0) |
- * Club domestic league appearances and goals as of 11:55, 1 November 2026 (UTC)

Emanuel Moreira Fernandes (born 23 March 2003) is a Portuguese professional footballer who plays as a centre-back for Santa Clara.

== Club career ==
Born in Lisbon, Moreira spent most of his youth years at Sporting CP, apart from three years with Sacavenense. He left the under-23 team, where he was captain, to sign for Liga Portugal 2 club Feirense in July 2024. In his two years at the club from Santa Maria da Feira, he played 48 games across all competitions and scored three goals; his first goal on 12 December 2025 came in the sixth minute of added time, to win 3–2 away to Torreense.

On 2 July 2026, Moreira moved to Santa Clara on a four-year contract. At the start of his first season in the Primeira Liga, he played every minute of six consecutive games.

== International career ==
Moreira played one match for the Portugal national under-19 team on 16 November 2021, a 1–0 friendly loss to Denmark in Paços de Ferreira. He replaced own goal-scorer Chico Lamba for the last ten minutes.

== Personal life ==
Of Bissau-Guinean descent, Moreira is the nephew of former Guinea-Bissau international Almami Moreira, and cousin of Germany youth international Eric da Silva Moreira and Belgium international Diego Moreira.
