= Bilal Yalçınkaya =

German footballer (born 2006)

Personal information
- Date of birth: 30 March 2006 (age 20)
- Place of birth: Hamburg, Germany
- Height: 1.84 m (6 ft 0 in)
- Position: Midfielder

Team information
- Current team: SC Verl
- Number: 10

Youth career
- 2012–2015: FC Süderelbe
- 2015–2017: FC St. Pauli
- 2017–2024: Hamburger SV

Senior career*
Years	Team	Apps	(Gls)
2024–2026	Hamburger SV II	45	(8)
2026–	SC Verl	0	(0)

International career^{‡}
2021–2022	Germany U16	3	(0)
2022–2023	Germany U17	8	(4)
2024	Germany U18	1	(0)
2024	Germany U19	5	(0)
Medal record
Men's football
Representing Germany
FIFA U-17 World Cup
Winner	2023 Indonesia
- * Club domestic league appearances and goals as of 20 June 2026 ‡ National team caps and goals as of 15 October 2024

Bilal Yalçınkaya (born 30 March 2006) is a German footballer who plays as a midfielder for 3. Liga club SC Verl. He won the 2023 FIFA U-17 World Cup with Germany.

== Career ==
Yalçınkaya joined the youth academy of Hamburger SV at the age of nine, having spent time at FC St. Pauli's setup, and started to train with Hamburg's first team at 16.

== Style of play ==
Yalçınkaya is an ambipedal attacking midfielder who can also play as a winger.

== Personal life ==
Born in Germany, Yalçınkaya is of Turkish descent and is the son of Emine and Muhammet Yalçınkaya. The family is not related to İbrahim Yalçınkaya, who represented Turkey at the 1960 Summer Olympics.

== Honours ==
- FIFA U-17 World Cup: 2023
