= Joan Tincres =

French footballer (born 2006)

Personal information
- Full name: Joan Lenny Yannis Tincres
- Date of birth: 17 June 2006 (age 20)
- Place of birth: Mantes-la-Jolie, France
- Height: 1.82 m (6 ft 0 in)
- Position: Forward

Team information
- Current team: Le Havre
- Number: 19

Youth career
- 2012–2021: FC Mantois
- 2021–2025: Monaco

Senior career*
Years	Team	Apps	(Gls)
2025–2026	Monaco	0	(0)
2025	→ Amiens (loan)	6	(0)
2026–	Le Havre	0	(0)

International career^{‡}
2023	France U17	5	(0)
2023	France U18	11	(4)
2024	France U19	6	(0)
2025–	France U20	1	(1)
- * Club domestic league appearances and goals as of 1 June 2026 ‡ National team caps and goals as of 14:02, 19 September 2025 (UTC)

Joan Lenny Yannis Tincres (born 17 June 2006) is a French professional footballer who plays as a forward for Ligue 1 club Le Havre.

== Club career ==
Tincres is a product of the youth academies of the clubs FC Mantois and Monaco. On 22 February 2024, he signed his first professional contract with Monaco until 2027. On 3 February 2025, he joined Ligue 2 club Amiens on loan for the second half of the 2024–25 season.

On 30 July 2026, Tincres signed a four-season contract with Le Havre.

== International career ==
Tincres was part of the France U17 squad that were finalists at the 2023 UEFA European Under-17 Championship. He was also part of the U17s for the 2023 FIFA U-17 World Cup, where they were again finalists. He was called up to the France U20s for the 2025 FIFA U-20 World Cup.
