= Ismaïl Bouneb =

French footballer (born 2006)

Personal information
- Full name: Ismaïl Bouneb
- Date of birth: 7 June 2006 (age 20)
- Place of birth: Lille, France
- Height: 1.82 m (6 ft 0 in)
- Position: Midfielder

Team information
- Current team: Le Havre
- Number: 44

Youth career
- 2011–2013: Olympique Marcquois
- 2013–2017: Lille
- 2017–2019: Olympique Marcquois
- 2019–2023: Valenciennes

Senior career*
| Years | Team | Apps | (Gls) |
| 2023–2024 | Valenciennes II | 8 | (1) |
| 2023–2024 | Valenciennes | 1 | (0) |
| 2024– | Le Havre | 2 | (0) |
| 2025–2026 | → Quevilly-Rouen (loan) | 24 | (6) |

International career^{‡}
| 2022–2023 | France U17 | 24 | (7) |
| 2023 | France U18 | 3 | (0) |
| 2024–2025 | France U19 | 11 | (3) |
Medal record
Men's football
Representing France
FIFA U-17 World Cup
| Runner-up | 2023 Indonesia |
UEFA European Under-17 Championship
| Runner-up | 2023 Hungary |
- * Club domestic league appearances and goals as of 19 September 2026 ‡ National team caps and goals as of 25 March 2025

Ismaïl Bouneb (born 7 June 2006) is a French footballer who plays as a midfielder for Ligue 1 club Le Havre.

== Early career ==
Born in Lille, Bouneb began his career at the age of 5 at Olympique Marcquois. In 2013, he joined LOSC Lille's academy but was released after four years. He returned to his former club, Olympique Marcquois, where he spent two seasons before he was signed by Valenciennes in 2019.

== Club career ==
On 1 September 2025, Bouneb was loaned to Quevilly-Rouen in the Championnat National.

== International career ==
Born in France, Bouneb is of Algerian descent. He chose to represent France in the international level. He was called up to the France U17 squad for the 2023 UEFA European Under-17 Championship. He started in four matches during the tournament, including the final game, where France was beaten by against Germany in the penalty shootouts after a 0–0 draw in regular time.

He took part in the 2023 FIFA U-17 World Cup with the France under-17s. In the quarter-final match against Uzbkeistan, he scored the only goal of the match to secure France's victory. In the following game, he scored the winning goal for the 2–1 victory against Mali to help France qualify for a FIFA U-17 World Cup final for the first time since 2001.

== Career statistics ==
As of match played 19 September 2026

Appearances and goals by club, season and competition
| Club | Season | League | | | Cup | | Europe | | Other | | Total | | |
| Club | Season | Division | Apps | Goals | Apps | Goals | Apps | Goals | Apps | Goals | Apps | Goals | |
|---|---|---|---|---|---|---|---|---|---|---|---|---|---|
| Valenciennes II | 2023–24 | CFA 1 | 8 | 1 | — | | — | | — | | 8 | 1 | |
| Valenciennes | 2023–24 | Ligue 2 | 1 | 0 | 0 | 0 | — | | — | | 1 | 0 | |
| Le Havre | 2024–25 | Ligue 1 | 0 | 0 | 0 | 0 | — | | — | | 0 | 0 | |
| Le Havre | 2026–27 | Ligue 1 | 2 | 0 | 0 | 0 | — | | — | | 2 | 0 | |
| Le Havre | Total | | 2 | 0 | 0 | 0 | — | | — | | 2 | 0 | |
| Quevilly-Rouen (loan) | 2025–26 | Ligue 3 | 24 | 6 | 2 | 1 | — | | — | | 26 | 7 | |
| Career total | | | 35 | 7 | 2 | 1 | 0 | 0 | 0 | 0 | 0 | 37 | 8 |

== Honours ==
U17 France

- UEFA European Under-17 Championship runner-up: 2023
- FIFA U-17 World Cup runner-up: 2023
