= Ibrahim Diarra (footballer) =

Malian footballer (born 2006)

Personal information
- Full name: Ibrahim Diarra
- Date of birth: 12 December 2006 (age 19)
- Place of birth: Mali
- Height: 1.80 m (5 ft 11 in)
- Position: Winger

Team information
- Current team: Barcelona B
- Number: 20

Youth career
- Academie Africa Foot
- 2025: Barcelona

Senior career*
Years	Team	Apps	(Gls)
2022–2024	Academie Africa Foot	25	(7)
2025–	Barcelona B	1	(0)

International career
2023	Mali U17	12	(5)
2025–	Mali U23	1	(0)
Medal record
Men's football
Representing Mali
FIFA U-17 World Cup
Third place	2023 Indonesia
- * Club domestic league appearances and goals

Ibrahim Diarra (born 12 November 2006) is a Malian professional footballer who plays as a right winger for Segunda Federación club Barcelona Atlètic.

== Early life ==
Diarra started playing football on the streets of Mali. After that, he caught the eye of scouts from Malian side Academie Africa Foot. He played for the club and received an education while playing for them.

== Career ==
Diarra has represented Mali internationally at youth level. He played for the Mali national under-17 football team at the 2023 FIFA U-17 World Cup.

On 17 December 2024, he signed with Barcelona Atlètic. Having initially had trials earlier in the year, the Catalan club was unable to sign him due to his age at the time.

On April 28 2025, Diarra scored twice and assisted once against Trabzonspor in the UEFA Youth League Final, helping his team win the title with a 4−1 victory.

== Style of play ==
Diarra mainly operates as a winger. He is known for his speed. He is left-footed.

== Honours ==
Mali U17

- FIFA U-17 World Cup third place: 2023

Individual

- FIFA U-17 World Cup Silver Boot: 2023

Barcelona U19

- Copa del Rey Juvenil de Fútbol: 2025
- UEFA Youth League: 2024–25
