= Bastien Meupiyou =

French footballer (born 2006)

Personal information
- Full name: Ndemeni Bastien Chefren Meupiyou Menadjou
- Date of birth: 19 March 2006 (age 20)
- Place of birth: Paris, France
- Height: 1.91 m (6 ft 3 in)
- Position: Centre-back

Team information
- Current team: Alverca
- Number: 33

Youth career
- –2018: Paris FC
- 2018–2019: Montfermeil
- 2019–2023: Nantes

Senior career*
| Years | Team | Apps | (Gls) |
| 2022–2024 | Nantes B | 18 | (0) |
| 2023–2024 | Nantes | 1 | (0) |
| 2024–2025 | Wolverhampton Wanderers | 0 | (0) |
| 2025– | Alverca | 30 | (0) |

International career^{‡}
| 2021–2022 | France U16 | 5 | (0) |
| 2022–2023 | France U17 | 15 | (2) |
| 2023– | France U18 | 7 | (1) |
Medal record
Men's football
Representing France
FIFA U-17 World Cup
| Runner-up | 2023 |
UEFA European Under-17 Championship
| Runner-up | 2023 |
- * Club domestic league appearances and goals as of 25 May 2026 ‡ National team caps and goals as of 22 November 2023

Ndemeni Bastien Chefren Meupiyou Menadjou (born 19 March 2006) is a French professional footballer who plays as a centre-back for Portuguese Primeira Liga club Alverca.

== Early life ==
Born in Paris, Meupiyou started his career playing for clubs in his region such as Paris FC and Montfermeil. In 2019, he joined the youth team of Nantes.

== Club career ==
On 1 September 2023, Meupiyou made his professional debut in a Ligue 1 game, appearing in the starting line-up for the match against Marseille. He received a red card in the 9th minute and was sent off, thus becoming the second youngest player in the league's history to receive a red card.

On 29 August 2024, Meupiyou signed for Premier League club Wolverhampton Wanderers. In the 2024–25 season, he played mostly for the U-23 squad. He was promoted to the first squad for several games in December and January, but remained on the bench in all those games.

On 22 July 2025, Meupiyou moved to Alverca in Portugal.

== International career ==
While also eligible to play for Cameroon, Meupiyou chose to represent France at youth level. In May 2023, he was selected with the France under 17s for the 2023 UEFA European Under-17 Championship organised in Hungary. Meupiyou appeared in all six matches during the tournament, including the final game against Germany where France was defeated in the penalty shootouts after a goalless draw in main time.

== Honours ==
U17 France

- UEFA European Under-17 Championship runner-up: 2023
- FIFA U-17 World Cup runner-up: 2023
