= Igor Benevenuto =

Brazilian football referee (born 1980)

Igor Junio Benevenuto (born 5 December 1980) is a Brazilian football referee.

== Early life ==
Benevenuto was born in 1980 in Brazil. He attended Faculdade Pitágoras in Brazil.

== Career ==
Benevenuto has worked as a referee in the Brazilian top flight since 2012. He has also worked as an international video assistant referee.

== Personal life ==
Benevenuto has worked for the Brazilian government. He has also worked as a nurse. He is an openly gay man and one of the first FIFA-listed referees to come out.
