= Yvann Titi =

French association footballer (born 2006)

Personal information
- Date of birth: 5 May 2006 (age 20)
- Place of birth: Strasbourg, France
- Height: 1.88 m (6 ft 2 in)
- Position: Defender

Team information
- Current team: Troyes
- Number: 44

Youth career
- 2013–2019: Créteil
- 2019–2020: Choisy-le-Roi
- 2020–2021: US Torcy
- 2021–2023: Troyes

Senior career*
Years	Team	Apps	(Gls)
2023–	Troyes II	13	(1)
2023–	Troyes	21	(0)
2024–2025	→ Lommel (loan)	22	(0)

International career^{‡}
2022	France U16	4	(0)
2022–2023	France U17	18	(2)
2023	France U18	4	(1)
2024–	France U19	5	(0)
Medal record
Men's football
Representing France
FIFA U-17 World Cup
Runner-up	2023 Indonesia
UEFA European Under-17 Championship
Runner-up	2023 Hungary
- * Club domestic league appearances and goals as of 11 May 2026 ‡ National team caps and goals as of 19 March 2025

Yvann Titi (born 5 May 2006) is a French footballer who plays as a defender for Ligue 1 club Troyes. He is a France youth international.

== Club career ==
Titi started his youth career at US Torcy in Torcy, Seine-et-Marne. Titi joined ES Troyes AC in 2020. He is described as capable of playing right back or centre back and joined the Troyes first-team squad playing in Ligue 2 for the 2023–24 season.

== International career ==
Born in France, Titi is of Angolan descent. He played for France U17 as they reached the final of the 2023 UEFA European Under-17 Championship in Hungary in May 2023. Titi was later selected for the France U17 squad for the 2023 FIFA U-17 World Cup in Indonesia in November 2023. He scored in the semi-final as France U17 beat Mali U-17 to reach the final.

== Honours ==
U17 France

- UEFA European Under-17 Championship runner-up: 2023
- FIFA U-17 World Cup runner-up: 2023
