= Eric da Silva Moreira =

German footballer (born 2006)

Personal information
- Full name: Eric Emanuel da Silva Moreira
- Date of birth: 3 May 2006 (age 20)
- Place of birth: Hamburg, Germany
- Height: 1.85 m (6 ft 1 in)
- Position: Right-back

Team information
- Current team: Excelsior (on loan from Nottingham Forest)
- Number: 2

Youth career
- 2011–2015: SC Victoria Hamburg
- 2015–2023: FC St. Pauli

Senior career*
Years	Team	Apps	(Gls)
2023–2024	FC St. Pauli II	10	(1)
2023–2024	FC St. Pauli	1	(0)
2024–	Nottingham Forest	2	(0)
2025–2026	→ Rio Ave (loan)	3	(0)
2026–	→ Excelsior (loan)	8	(0)

International career^{‡}
2021–2022	Germany U16	10	(2)
2022–2023	Germany U17	25	(3)
2024	Germany U18	4	(0)
2024–2025	Germany U19	9	(0)
2025–	Germany U20	8	(2)
Medal record
Men's football
Representing Germany
FIFA U-17 World Cup
Winner	2023 Indonesia
UEFA European Under-17 Championship
Winner	2023 Hungary
- * Club domestic league appearances and goals as of 7 November 2026 ‡ National team caps and goals as of 21:43, 13 November 2026 (UTC)

Eric Emanuel da Silva Moreira (born 3 May 2006) is a German professional footballer who plays as a right-back for Eredivisie club Excelsior, on loan from Premier League club Nottingham Forest.

== Club career ==
Born in Hamburg, da Silva Moreira is a youth product of SC Victoria Hamburg and FC St. Pauli.

=== St. Pauli ===
In June 2023, he started training with FC St. Pauli senior team. But despite his recognised talent he did not progress any further with the first team, amid tensions around his contract ending the following summer.

He eventually was promoted to FC St. Pauli II in October 2023. Moreira made his professional debut with the team in a 2–0 Regionalliga Nord loss to Drochtersen/Assel on 21 October 2023.

=== Nottingham Forest ===
On 25 June 2024, da Silva Moreira joined English Premier League side Nottingham Forest on a four-year deal for an undisclosed fee.

==== Loan to Rio Ave ====
On 1 September 2025, Moreira joined Primeira Liga club Rio Ave on loan until the end of the 2025-26 season. On 11 January 2026, after making just three appearances for the Portuguese side, his loan was terminated by mutual agreement.

==== Loan to Excelsior ====
On 26 August 2026, Moreira joined Eredivisie side Excelsior on a season-long loan deal.

== International career ==
Born in Germany, da Silva Moreira also has Portuguese, Bissau-Guinean and Polish origins. He is a youth international for Germany, having played for the under-16 and under-17.

With Germany U17 he was a standout in the 2023 European Championship and the following World Cup that his team both won.

== Style of play ==
A versatile right-footed player, da Silva Moreira can play either as a centre-forward, winger or right-back.

== Personal life ==
Da Silva Moreira is the nephew of former footballer Almami Moreira and the cousin of current AC Milan player Diego Moreira. and Emanuel Moreira.

== Career statistics ==
As of match played 1 November 2026

Appearances and goals by club, season and competition
Club	Season	League			National cup (Note: Includes FA Cup, KNVB Cup)		League cup (Note: Includes EFL Cup)		Europe		Other		Total	
Club	Season	Division	Apps	Goals	Apps	Goals	Apps	Goals	Apps	Goals	Apps	Goals	Apps	Goals
FC St. Pauli II	2023–24	Regionalliga Nord	10	1	—		—		—		—		10	1
FC St. Pauli	2023–24	2. Bundesliga	1	0	0	0	—		—		—		1	0
Nottingham Forest	2024–25	Premier League	2	0	2	0	1	0	—		—		5	0
Nottingham Forest	2025–26	Premier League	0	0	—		—		0	0	—		0	0
Nottingham Forest	Total		2	0	2	0	1	0	0	0	—		5	0
Rio Ave (loan)	2025–26	Primeira Liga	3	0	0	0	—		—		—		3	0
Excelsior (loan)	2026–27	Eredivisie	8	0	1	0	—		—		—		9	0
Career total			24	1	3	0	1	0	0	0	0	0	28	1

== Honours ==
Germany U17

- UEFA European Under-17 Championship: 2023
- FIFA U-17 World Cup: 2023

Individual

- UEFA European Under-17 Championship Team of the Tournament: 2023
