= 2023 U-17 Africa Cup of Nations squads =

The 2023 Africa U-17 Cup of Nations is an international age-restricted football tournament which is currently being held in Algeria from 29 April-19 May. The 12 national teams involved in the tournament were required to register a squad of 21 players with an option of up to 5 more additional players, including 3 goalkeepers. Only players born on or after 1 January 2006 are eligible to be registered in these squads, only players registered in the squads are eligible to take part in the tournament.

== Group A ==
=== Algeria ===
Head coach: (Algeria) Rezki Remane

No.	Pos.	Player	Date of birth (age)	Club
1	GK	Mastias Hammache	25 November 2006 (aged 16)	(Canadian Soccer Association) CF Montréal
2	DF	Yakoub Gassi	6 March 2006 (aged 17)	(Algerian Football Federation) Académie SBA FAF
3	DF	Younes Badani	7 June 2006 (aged 16)	(Algerian Football Federation) Paradou AC
4	DF	Abdelhak Ben Idder	10 November 2006 (aged 16)	(Algerian Football Federation) Paradou AC
5	MF	Younes Benali	14 August 2006 (aged 16)	(French Football Federation) Nantes
6	MF	Anes Abed	31 March 2007 (aged 16)	(Algerian Football Federation) Académie SBA FAF
7	FW	Mohamed Abdelmoudjib	4 May 2006 (aged 16)	(Royal Spanish Football Federation) Hércules CF
8	FW	Shain Chetioui	25 July 2006 (aged 16)	(French Football Federation) Le Havre
9	FW	Moslem Anatouf	8 May 2006 (aged 16)	(Algerian Football Federation) Académie SBA FAF
10	MF	Yanis Ferhat Delaveau	6 September 2006 (aged 16)	(French Football Federation) Nancy
11	FW	Issam Yazid	28 May 2006 (aged 16)	(Algerian Football Federation) CR Belouizdad
12	DF	Fadi Ben Abdelkader	22 June 2006 (aged 16)	(Algerian Football Federation) Académie SBA FAF
13	DF	Rami Bouaouiche	26 May 2006 (aged 16)	(Algerian Football Federation) Académie SBA FAF
14	FW	Ziad Mohamed Ali Saleh	2 February 2006 (aged 17)	(Egyptian Football Association) Zamalek
15	DF	Ziad Nadjm Eddine Nemer	16 July 2006 (aged 16)	(Algerian Football Federation) Académie SBA FAF
16	GK	Mehdi Bouteldja	28 January 2006 (aged 17)	(Algerian Football Federation) Académie SBA FAF
17	MF	Youcef Belkaid	10 October 2006 (aged 16)	(Algerian Football Federation) Paradou AC
18	DF	Faiz Amem	13 August 2006 (aged 16)	(Algerian Football Federation) Académie SBA FAF
19	MF	Ala Eddine Limane	26 May 2006 (aged 16)	(Algerian Football Federation) Académie SBA FAF
20	FW	Zyed Beltaief	27 March 2006 (aged 17)	(French Football Federation) Ajaccio
21	FW	Djibril Bahlouli	8 May 2006 (aged 16)	(French Football Federation) Lyon
22	MF	Amine Galou	11 January 2006 (aged 17)	(Algerian Football Federation) Paradou AC
23	GK	Tarek Hamadi	31 December 2006 (aged 16)	(Algerian Football Federation) Paradou AC
24	DF	Hocine Adem Arous	31 October 2006 (aged 16)	(French Football Federation) Auxerre
25	DF	Nadir Yakoubi	4 August 2006 (aged 16)	(Algerian Football Federation) Académie SBA FAF
26	FW	Fethi Kessassi	11 February 2006 (aged 17)	(Algerian Football Federation) Académie SBA FAF

=== Senegal ===
Head coach: (Senegal) Serigne Dia

No.	Pos.	Player	Date of birth (age)	Club
1	GK	Serigne Diouf	25 March 2006 (aged 17)	(Senegalese Football Federation) Génération Foot
2	FW	Kalfara Camara	19 October 2006 (aged 16)	(Senegalese Football Federation) Génération Foot
3	DF	Mamadou Aliou Diallo	21 February 2007 (aged 16)	(Senegalese Football Federation) Diambars FC
4	DF	Serigne Fallou Diouf	31 December 2006 (aged 16)	(Senegalese Football Federation) Sahel Atlantic FC
5	MF	Ibrahima Sory Sow	20 October 2008 (aged 14)	(Senegalese Football Federation) Génération Foot
6	MF	Abdou Aziz Fall	20 February 2007 (aged 16)	(Senegalese Football Federation) Keur Madior FC
7	MF	Yaya Dieme	16 October 2007 (aged 15)	(Senegalese Football Federation) Diambars FC
8	MF	Fallou Fall	8 March 2006 (aged 17)	(Senegalese Football Federation) AS Dakar Sacré-Cœur
9	FW	Omar Sall	2 November 2008 (aged 14)	(Senegalese Football Federation) Environment Foot
10	FW	Amara Diouf	7 June 2008 (aged 14)	(Senegalese Football Federation) Génération Foot
11	FW	Mamadou Lamine Sadio	24 December 2007 (aged 15)	(Senegalese Football Federation) Environment Foot
12	DF	Guy Felix Lima	7 October 2006 (aged 16)	(Senegalese Football Federation) AFAT Theis
13	MF	Abdou Salam Konate	25 November 2006 (aged 16)	(Italian Football Federation) Parma
14	MF	Pierre Antoine Diatta Dorival	15 March 2006 (aged 17)	(Senegalese Football Federation) Guelawars De Fatick
15	FW	Mame Mody Sy	8 March 2007 (aged 16)	(Senegalese Football Federation) AS Dakar Sacré-Cœur
16	GK	Macoura Mboup	18 December 2007 (aged 15)	(Senegalese Football Federation) Génération Foot
17	DF	Ibrahima Diallo	13 September 2007 (aged 15)	(Senegalese Football Federation) Génération Foot
18	FW	Papa Alioune Ndiaye	6 March 2007 (aged 16)	(Senegalese Football Federation) Espoirs de Guédiawaye
19	MF	Ibrahima Gueye	11 May 2007 (aged 15)	(Senegalese Football Federation) Diambars FC
20	FW	Cherif Kéba Niabaly	28 August 2006 (aged 16)	(Senegalese Football Federation) Ocean FC
21	DF	Modou Makhfouz Sene	17 August 2007 (aged 15)	(Senegalese Football Federation) Diambars FC
22	DF	Mamadou Lamine Ba Bandia	31 December 2007 (aged 15)	(Senegalese Football Federation) Amitié FC de Thiès
23	GK	Cheikh Bamba Fall	7 July 2007 (aged 15)	(Senegalese Football Federation) Diambars FC
24	MF	Joseph Namatane	30 November 2006 (aged 16)	(Senegalese Football Federation) Génération Foot
25	FW	Mamadou Sawane	22 February 2006 (aged 17)	(Senegalese Football Federation) AFAT Theis
26	DF	Lassana Traoré	6 May 2007 (aged 15)	(Senegalese Football Federation) Diambars FC

=== Congo ===
Head coach: (Italy) Fabrizio Cesana

No.	Pos.	Player	Date of birth (age)	Club
1	GK	Chelcy Prince Exauce Bonazebiage	18 May 2006 (aged 16)	(Congolese Football Federation) CARA Brazzaville
2	DF	Baudleck Chance Faride Nganda	8 January 2006 (aged 17)	(Congolese Football Federation) AS Otohô
3	DF	Joan La Porta Malong-Hewa	6 October 2006 (aged 16)	(Congolese Football Federation) Avenir FC
4	DF	Brad Mantsounga	6 September 2007 (aged 15)	(French Football Federation) Nice
5	DF	Axel Richilaude Lebo	30 April 2006 (aged 16)	(Congolese Football Federation) Avenir FC
6	DF	Christian Gloire Mafoulou	20 June 2006 (aged 16)	(Congolese Football Federation) CARA Brazzaville
7	FW	Geltany Stalgout Bantsiele	30 October 2006 (aged 16)	(Congolese Football Federation) FC Sirina
8	MF	Digne Kaelas Pounga	15 May 2006 (aged 16)	(Congolese Football Federation) Avenir FC
9	FW	Alexandre Dylan Cesaire Boukoulou	25 August 2006 (aged 16)	(French Football Federation) Clermont
10	MF	Abiga Wumba Niati Tsimba	26 December 2007 (aged 15)	(Congolese Football Federation) Racing Club de Brazzaville
11	FW	Joseph Archange Ndzoukou	28 July 2006 (aged 16)	(Congolese Football Federation) Avenir FC
12	MF	Mignon Elgi Olyba Onze	12 January 2006 (aged 17)	(Congolese Football Federation) JS Talangaï
13	DF	Aaron Chance Francois Maniongui	20 March 2006 (aged 17)	(French Football Federation) FCO Jean
14	FW	Beny Fraisnel Moukila Mpele	21 June 2007 (aged 15)	(French Football Federation) Nice
15	FW	Bienvenu Sidney Bizenga	13 August 2006 (aged 16)	(Congolese Football Federation) Avenir FC
16	GK	Ghys-Exauce Baliel Tchiamas	8 July 2006 (aged 16)	(French Football Federation) Quevilly-Rouen
17	DF	Noa Kayi	22 June 2008 (aged 14)	(French Football Federation) Orléans
18	FW	Ayel Wumba Niati Nzouzi	26 December 2007 (aged 15)	(Congolese Football Federation) AC Capaco Beni
19	MF	Randy Baleka	22 January 2006 (aged 17)	(French Football Federation) FC Lyon
20	DF	Brayan Lorson Kenge	1 July 2007 (aged 15)	(French Football Federation) FC Argenteuil
21	FW	Jason Deven Aime Bemba	31 March 2006 (aged 17)	(French Football Federation) Sochaux
22	FW	Gloire Nzebele	24 August 2007 (aged 15)	(Congolese Football Federation) Avenir FC
23	GK	Gloire My-God Mierandzou	12 April 2006 (aged 17)	(Congolese Football Federation) FC DCNP DU CONGO
24	FW	Dieuveil Ngazania	23 March 2006 (aged 17)	(Congolese Football Federation) FC Sirina
25	MF	Lucas Claude Emmanuel Simon Mbouyou Woodcock	5 February 2007 (aged 16)	(French Football Federation) Tours FC
26	FW	Jean Joseph Richy Elongo	17 March 2006 (aged 17)	(French Football Federation) FC Argenteuil

=== Somalia ===
Head coach: (Somalia) Mohamed Amin Nor

No.	Pos.	Player	Date of birth (age)	Club
1	GK	Mohamed Adan Osman	1 January 2007 (aged 16)	(Somali Football Federation) Hiliwa Academy
2	DF	Abdulle Abdullahi Abdulle	3 November 2006 (aged 16)	(Somali Football Federation) Heegan FC
3	DF	Khalid Ahmed Hassan	9 February 2006 (aged 17)	(Somali Football Federation) Darul Tarbiyah
4	DF	Abdulkadir Osman Mohamed	10 April 2007 (aged 16)	(Somali Football Federation) Jaziira SC
5	DF	Ayub Hassan Madey	1 February 2007 (aged 16)	(Somali Football Federation) Jabir School
6	MF	Said Mohamed Abdi	5 January 2006 (aged 17)	(Somali Football Federation) Umah Hospital
7	MF	Abdalla Omar Osman	8 July 2006 (aged 16)	(Somali Football Federation) Gasko FC
8	MF	Mohamud Abdukadir Mustaf	7 February 2006 (aged 17)	(Somali Football Federation) Gasko FC
9	FW	Abdirahin Mohamed Dahir	26 June 2006 (aged 16)	(Somali Football Federation) Gasko FC
10	MF	Abdihafid Mohamed Abdi	10 June 2007 (aged 15)	(Somali Football Federation) Elman FC
11	FW	Badri Hussein Ahmed	3 August 2006 (aged 16)	(Somali Football Federation) Woxol FC
12	DF	Hassan Adan Barreh	18 September 2007 (aged 15)	(The Football Association) Leicester City
13	GK	Abdikadir Ali Mohamed	19 May 2006 (aged 16)	(Somali Football Federation) Badbaado
14	MF	Ahmed Hassan Mohamed	6 March 2007 (aged 16)	(Somali Football Federation) Banadir SC
15	DF	Muhidin Mukhtar Isman	1 October 2007 (aged 15)	(Somali Football Federation) Jabir School
16	FW	Abdirahin Farah Kulane	10 February 2007 (aged 16)	(Somali Football Federation) Xamarweyne Academy
17	FW	Yasiin Abdirahman Abdelqadir	23 August 2006 (aged 16)	(Norwegian Football Federation) Lyn
18	DF	Abdirahman Ahmed Abdalla	1 May 2006 (aged 16)	(Somali Football Federation) Heegan FC
20	MF	Idriis Abdiwahab Aden	25 June 2007 (aged 15)	(Swedish Football Association) IFK Uddevalla
21	FW	Abdiasis Abdirahman Bahur	3 March 2006 (aged 17)	(Canadian Soccer Association) Toronto FC
22	FW	Dini Mohamed Dahir	1 June 2007 (aged 15)	(Somali Football Federation) Banadir SC
23	GK	Jabril Ali Ahmed	20 March 2007 (aged 16)	(Somali Football Federation) Dalsan School

== Group B ==
=== Nigeria ===
Head coach: (Nigeria) Nduka Ugbade

No.	Pos.	Player	Date of birth (age)	Club
1	GK	Richard Odoh	23 November 2006 (aged 16)	(Nigeria Football Federation) HB Academy
2	DF	Yahaya Danjuma Lawali	5 June 2006 (aged 16)	(Nigeria Football Federation) Mahanaim FC
3	DF	Emmanuel Michael	16 June 2006 (aged 16)	(Nigeria Football Federation) Simon Ben FA
4	MF	Haruna Abdullahi	1 January 2007 (aged 16)	(Nigeria Football Federation) Kurfi Tigers Academy
5	DF	Tochukwu Joseph Ogboji	15 December 2006 (aged 16)	(Nigeria Football Federation) Purple Crown FA
6	DF	Jeremiah Olawaseyi Olaleke	20 February 2006 (aged 17)	(Nigeria Football Federation) Ablaze Football Academy
7	MF	Umar Abubakar	15 February 2006 (aged 17)	(Nigeria Football Federation) Devine FA
8	FW	Abubakar Idris Abdullahi	27 January 2006 (aged 17)	(Nigeria Football Federation) Jega United
9	FW	Precious Tonye Williams	2 October 2006 (aged 16)	(Nigeria Football Federation) HB Football Academy
10	MF	Ifeoluwa Adewale Olowoporoku	15 July 2008 (aged 14)	(Nigeria Football Federation) Tripple 44 Football Academy
11	FW	Charles Adah Agada	3 September 2006 (aged 16)	(Nigeria Football Federation) Mavlon FC
12	MF	Hope Yusuf Linus	10 August 2006 (aged 16)	(Nigeria Football Federation) EE Sporting Club
13	FW	Jubril Opeyemi Azeez	8 September 2006 (aged 16)	(Nigeria Football Federation) Right Vision Choice FA
14	MF	Anongu Isaac Aondoakaa	28 August 2007 (aged 15)	(Nigeria Football Federation) FC Bethel Sporting
15	DF	Israel Nwachukwu Usulor	20 June 2007 (aged 15)	(Nigeria Football Federation) Real Sapphire FC
16	GK	Temiloluwa Olouwayimika Adelakin	12 June 2006 (aged 16)	(Nigeria Football Federation) Box 2 Box Football Academy
17	MF	Simon Karshe Cletus	10 February 2008 (aged 15)	(Nigeria Football Federation) Mavlon FA
18	FW	Tochukwu Simeon Ogbadibo	20 June 2007 (aged 15)	(Nigeria Football Federation) Jossy United
19	FW	Light Chijioke Eke	14 April 2006 (aged 17)	(Nigeria Football Federation) C & C FA
20	FW	Favour Oluwasegun Daniel	12 March 2006 (aged 17)	(Nigeria Football Federation) G12 Football Academy
21	DF	Chijoke Julius Linus	31 July 2006 (aged 16)	(Nigeria Football Federation) Tripple 44 Football Academy
22	DF	Quadri Oluwatobiloba Adewale	7 September 2007 (aged 15)	(Nigeria Football Federation) Nathaniel Boys FC
23	GK	Gift Ukeh Adie	7 February 2007 (aged 16)	(Nigeria Football Federation) Paul E FA
24	MF	Musa Oluwayesi Akinfenwa	4 September 2007 (aged 15)	(Nigeria Football Federation) Real Sapphire FC
25	MF	Usman Ajibola Owoyemi	12 August 2006 (aged 16)	(Nigeria Football Federation) Tripple 44 FA
26	MF	Matthew Awodi Kingsley	26 November 2006 (aged 16)	(The Football Association) Brooke House College

=== Morocco ===
Head coach: (Morocco) Saïd Chiba

No.	Pos.	Player	Date of birth (age)	Club
1	GK	Taha Benrhozil	18 June 2006 (aged 16)	(Royal Moroccan Football Federation) Mohammed VI Football Academy
2	DF	Hamza Koutoune	17 September 2006 (aged 16)	(Royal Moroccan Football Federation) Mohammed VI Football Academy
3	DF	Fouad Zahouani	18 April 2006 (aged 17)	(Royal Moroccan Football Federation) Mohammed VI Football Academy
4	MF	Adam Boufandar	11 August 2006 (aged 16)	(Italian Football Federation) Juventus
5	DF	Abdelhamid Ait Boudlal	16 April 2006 (aged 17)	(Royal Moroccan Football Federation) Mohammed VI Football Academy
6	MF	Adam Chakir	3 January 2006 (aged 17)	(Royal Moroccan Football Federation) Mohammed VI Football Academy
7	FW	Said Errafiy	23 April 2006 (aged 17)	(Royal Moroccan Football Federation) Mohammed VI Football Academy
8	MF	Mohamed Radouane	25 July 2007 (aged 15)	(Royal Moroccan Football Federation) Fath US
9	FW	Adam Hanin	5 January 2006 (aged 17)	(Royal Moroccan Football Federation) Fath US
10	MF	Marouane Rayan Bayad	25 February 2006 (aged 17)	(Royal Moroccan Football Federation) Mohammed VI Football Academy
11	FW	Othmane Elidrissi Erahhali	7 October 2006 (aged 16)	(German Football Association) Darmstadt 98
12	GK	Hamza Jlid	9 December 2006 (aged 16)	(Royal Moroccan Football Federation) Fath US
13	DF	Saifdine Chlaghmo	27 January 2006 (aged 17)	(Royal Moroccan Football Federation) AS FAR
14	DF	Mohammed Kebdani	13 May 2006 (aged 16)	(Royal Moroccan Football Federation) AS FAR
15	FW	Mouad Bougaizane	13 January 2006 (aged 17)	(Royal Moroccan Football Federation) AS FAR
16	MF	Haitam El Mousse	14 September 2007 (aged 15)	(Royal Moroccan Football Federation) Mohammed VI Football Academy
17	MF	Abdel Hamid Maali	16 March 2006 (aged 17)	(Royal Moroccan Football Federation) IR Tanger
18	FW	Zakaria Ouazane	24 September 2006 (aged 16)	(Royal Dutch Football Association) Ajax
19	DF	Smail Bakhty	29 November 2006 (aged 16)	(Royal Moroccan Football Federation) AS FAR
20	MF	Mohamed Amine Katiba	1 March 2006 (aged 17)	(Royal Moroccan Football Federation) Hassania Agadir
21	MF	Hamza El Motaouakkel	23 February 2006 (aged 17)	(Royal Moroccan Football Federation) Mohammed VI Football Academy
22	GK	Imrane Sadiki	1 January 2006 (aged 17)	(Royal Moroccan Football Federation) AS FAR
23	FW	Ayman Ennair	6 April 2006 (aged 17)	(Royal Moroccan Football Federation) Fath US
24	MF	Mohamed Zine El Abidine Hamony	5 August 2006 (aged 16)	(French Football Federation) Le Havre
25	FW	Adnane El Ahmer	4 July 2006 (aged 16)	(Royal Moroccan Football Federation) Raja CA
26	FW	Zakaria Allaoui	5 April 2006 (aged 17)	(Royal Moroccan Football Federation) Maghreb de Fès

=== South Africa ===
No.	Pos.	Player	Date of birth (age)	Club
1	GK	Gennaro Jackson	22 November 2007 (age 18)	(South African Football Association) Cape Town Spurs
2	DF	Xhosa Manyama	9 January 2006 (age 20)	(South African Football Association) Cape Town City
3	DF	Keitumetse Lesia	22 May 2006 (age 20)	(South African Football Association) SuperSport United
4	DF	Benjamin Wallace	8 May 2006 (age 20)	(South African Football Association) SuperSport United
5	DF	Waylon Renecke	12 May 2006 (age 20)	(The Football Association) Norwich City
6	MF	Xolani Tshaka	9 February 2006 (age 20)	(South African Football Association) Orlando Pirates
7	MF	Dhakier Lee	7 May 2006 (age 20)	(South African Football Association) Cape Town Spurs
8	FW	Gabriel Amato	27 July 2006 (age 20)	(South African Football Association) Cape Town City
9	MF	Michael Dokunmu	9 April 2006 (age 20)	(Royal Dutch Football Association) Vitesse
10	MF	Xavier Jodamus	25 April 2006 (age 20)	(South African Football Association) Ubuntu Cape Town
11	MF	Vicky Mkhawana	10 January 2006 (age 20)	(South African Football Association) Kaizer Chiefs
12	DF	Vincent Sithole	2 January 2006 (age 20)	(South African Football Association) Mamelodi Sundowns
13	MF	Gomolemo Kekana	7 July 2006 (age 20)	(South African Football Association) TS Galaxy
14	DF	Tyler Cicero	2 January 2006 (age 20)	(South African Football Association) Stellenbosch
15	FW	Bennet Mokoena	18 June 2007 (age 19)	(South African Football Association) Mamelodi Sundowns
16	GK	Kyle Jansen	23 February 2006 (age 20)	(United States Soccer Federation) Atlanta United
17	FW	Luke Baartman	12 June 2006 (age 20)	(South African Football Association) Cape Town Spurs
18	FW	Orifha Maubelo	18 January 2006 (age 20)	(Canadian Soccer Association) Capital City
19	DF	Thato Sibiya	23 June 2006 (age 20)	(South African Football Association) Mamelodi Sundowns
20	FW	Siyabonga Mabena	18 February 2007 (age 19)	(South African Football Association) Mamelodi Sundowns
21	GK	Takalani Mazhamba	30 May 2007 (age 19)	(South African Football Association) Kaizer Chiefs

=== Zambia ===
No.	Pos.	Player	Date of birth (age)	Club
1	GK	Anthony Matafwali	8 October 2008 (age 17)	(Football Association of Zambia) Shamuel
2	DF	Josiah Kabandula	18 December 2007 (age 18)	(Football Association of Zambia) Napsa Stars
3	DF	Chimuka Lweendo	8 May 2008 (age 18)	(Football Association of Zambia) Atletico Lusaka
4	DF	Milimo Nalumango	3 September 2007 (age 19)	(German Football Association) DFI Bad Aibling
5	DF	Charles Kampamba	15 November 2007 (age 18)	(Football Association of Zambia) SATE Academy
6	MF	Aaron Phiri	17 June 2006 (age 20)	(Football Association of Zambia) Kafue Celtic
7	MF	Josim Sikazwe	13 July 2008 (age 18)	(Football Association of Zambia) Kamanya
8	MF	Samson Malaya	6 January 2006 (age 20)	(Football Association of Zambia) Atletico Lusaka
9	MF	Emmanuel Mwanza	25 December 2006 (age 19)	(Football Association of Zambia) Kafue Celtic
10	DF	Aaron Simpasa	22 November 2006 (age 19)	(Football Association of Zambia) Kafue Celtic
11	FW	Lineker Mbesuma	14 July 2007 (age 19)	(South African Football Association) Jomo Cosmos
12	DF	David Hamansenya	24 June 2007 (age 19)	(Football Association of Zambia) Shamuel
14	FW	Joseph Liteta	22 January 2006 (age 20)	(Football Association of Zambia) Atletico Lusaka
15	MF	Obvious Mwaliteta Jr.	15 May 2006 (age 20)	(Bahamas Football Association) Cubs
16	GK	Shadreck Kalyati	15 August 2007 (age 19)	(Football Association of Zambia) Chainda Bombers
17	FW	Marcel Zimba	11 April 2006 (age 20)	(Football Association of Zambia) Atletico Lusaka
18	FW	Stanley Nyamikwe	2 October 2008 (age 17)	(Football Association of Zambia) Pataaki
19	DF	Sekanji Siame	22 March 2006 (age 20)	(Football Association of Zambia) Konkola Blades
20	FW	Luketekelo Kapowa	10 September 2007 (age 19)	(Football Association of Zambia) Morkved Sports
21	DF	Jonathan Kalimina	24 November 2008 (age 17)	(Football Association of Zambia) Kafue Celtic
22	FW	Andrew James Phiri	24 March 2007 (age 19)	(Football Association of Zambia) Game On Academy
23	GK	Hendrix Kanyunglu	23 June 2007 (age 19)	(Football Association of Zambia) Kafue Celtic
25	MF	Bunonge Bunonge	7 January 2007 (age 19)	(Football Association of Zambia) Nangweshi Pirates
26	FW	James Nene Sibeene	25 April 2008 (age 18)	(Football Association of Zambia) Football Chance Academy

== Group C ==
=== Cameroon ===
No.	Pos.	Player	Date of birth (age)	Club
1	GK	Jason Moulle	11 July 2008 (aged 14)	(Cameroonian Football Federation) Union Douala
2	DF	Eiffrel Mbock	22 December 2007 (aged 15)	(Cameroonian Football Federation) Oyili
3	DF	Ebong Muabe	19 May 2008 (aged 14)	(Cameroonian Football Federation) Fako United
4	DF	Junior Fouda	4 May 2007 (aged 15)	(Cameroonian Football Federation) Fortuna du Mfou
5	DF	Barnabe Atalmba	14 July 2007 (aged 15)	(Cameroonian Football Federation) Ecole de Football Brasseries du Cameroun
6	MF	Sony Evina	12 October 2006 (aged 16)	(Cameroonian Football Federation) Olympique Biwong Baney
7	FW	Tize Abib	17 October 2008 (aged 14)	(Cameroonian Football Federation) Soleil Garoua
8	MF	Collins Akamba	10 March 2007 (aged 16)	(Cameroonian Football Federation) Ecole de Football Brasseries du Cameroun
9	FW	Dorinel Matah	10 February 2007 (aged 16)	(Cameroonian Football Federation) Ecole de Football Brasseries du Cameroun
10	FW	Harouna Djibirin	5 November 2006 (aged 16)	(Cameroonian Football Federation) Dauphine
11	FW	Abakar Aladji	15 June 2006 (aged 16)	(Cameroonian Football Federation) AS King Football Academy
12	FW	Tidjani Abdoullahi	10 June 2006 (aged 16)	(Cameroonian Football Federation) Player
13	MF	Maurel Olama	4 April 2008 (aged 15)	(Cameroonian Football Federation) Fortuna du Mfou
14	MF	Samuel Tchomagni	25 February 2007 (aged 16)	(Cameroonian Football Federation) Eding Sport
15	MF	Jules Biloa	23 April 2007 (aged 16)	(Cameroonian Football Federation) Oyili
16	GK	Junior Abou	23 September 2008 (aged 14)	(Cameroonian Football Federation) Fondation Tafi
17	DF	Henri Balla	2 January 2007 (aged 16)	(Cameroonian Football Federation) Olympique de Yaoundé
18	FW	Rodrigue Essono	10 June 2006 (aged 16)	(Cameroonian Football Federation) Player
19	DF	Ghane Talipouo	25 April 2006 (aged 17)	(Cameroonian Football Federation) Fondation Tafi
20	DF	Ivan Meye	6 September 2006 (aged 16)	(Cameroonian Football Federation) ANAFOOT
21	MF	Abdel Mfonka	2 April 2007 (aged 16)	(Cameroonian Football Federation) Young Talent Academy
22	DF	Stephane Noumbissie	25 December 2006 (aged 16)	(Cameroonian Football Federation) Dauphine
23	GK	Cédric Badang	13 April 2007 (aged 16)	(Cameroonian Football Federation) Ecole de Football Brasseries du Cameroun
24	MF	Miguel Atche	2 December 2008 (aged 14)	(Cameroonian Football Federation) Young Talent Academy
25	FW	Ayuck Cosmas	10 January 2007 (aged 16)	(Cameroonian Football Federation) Best Stars de Limbe
26	FW	Fils Njayick	22 August 2007 (aged 15)	(Cameroonian Football Federation) Espoir

=== Burkina Faso ===
No.	Pos.	Player	Date of birth (age)	Club
1	GK	Mohamed Traoré	20 August 2006 (aged 16)	(Burkinabé Football Federation) Shamuel
2	DF	Nouhoun Bamba	2 June 2006 (aged 16)	(Burkinabé Football Federation) Tenakourou
3	FW	Aboubacar Camara	30 September 2006 (aged 16)	(Burkinabé Football Federation) Rahimo
4	DF	Aly Sory	10 November 2006 (aged 16)	(Burkinabé Football Federation) Réal du Faso
5	DF	Junior Traore	21 February 2006 (aged 17)	(Burkinabé Football Federation) News Stars FC
6	MF	Baldé Bah	25 January 2006 (aged 17)	(Burkinabé Football Federation) News Stars FC
7	FW	Ousmane Camara	1 January 2006 (aged 17)	(Burkinabé Football Federation) Rahimo
8	MF	Arouna Ouattara	27 December 2006 (aged 16)	(Burkinabé Football Federation) Vitesse
9	FW	Jack Diarra	16 June 2006 (aged 16)	(Burkinabé Football Federation) Salitas
10	MF	Cheick Camara	1 January 2006 (aged 17)	(Burkinabé Football Federation) Vitesse
11	FW	Appolinaire Bougma	15 January 2007 (aged 16)	(Burkinabé Football Federation) AS ECO
12	DF	Hamzah Traoré	7 April 2007 (aged 16)	(Burkinabé Football Federation) Rahimo
13	DF	Drissa Traoré	5 August 2006 (aged 16)	(Burkinabé Football Federation) Tenakourou
14	DF	Lassina Traoré	10 January 2007 (aged 16)	(Burkinabé Football Federation) Rahimo
15	MF	Idrissa Sore	26 February 2007 (aged 16)	(Burkinabé Football Federation) Réal du Faso
16	GK	Abdoulaye Traoré	27 March 2006 (aged 17)	(Burkinabé Football Federation) Association Nassara FC
17	DF	Landry Yaméogo	31 December 2006 (aged 16)	(Burkinabé Football Federation) Réal du Faso
18	FW	Souleymane Alio	28 October 2006 (aged 16)	(Burkinabé Football Federation) New Stars
19	FW	Bougasse Pouabizan	7 January 2006 (aged 17)	(Burkinabé Football Federation) Salitas
20	MF	Emmanuel Ouédraogo	24 November 2007 (aged 15)	(Burkinabé Football Federation) Rahimo
21	DF	Erwinn Nikiéma	14 September 2006 (aged 16)	(French Football Federation) Red Star FC
22	FW	Farouz Ouedraogo	29 December 2007 (aged 15)	(Burkinabé Football Federation) Rahimo
23	MF	Amine Compaoré	31 December 2007 (aged 15)	(Burkinabé Football Federation) KOZAF
24	MF	Aboubacar Zoromé	26 August 2007 (aged 15)	(Burkinabé Football Federation)
25	GK	Ismaila Sawadogo	30 November 2008 (aged 14)	(Burkinabé Football Federation) Cheetah FC

=== Mali ===
No.	Pos.	Player	Date of birth (age)	Club
1	GK	Bourama Kone	10 March 2007 (aged 16)	(Malian Football Federation) Yeelen Olympique
2	DF	Alassane Togola	21 January 2007 (aged 16)	(Malian Football Federation) JMG Bamako
3	DF	Abdoul Razak Toure	31 December 2006 (aged 16)	(Malian Football Federation) JMG Bamako
4	DF	Ousmane Simpara	13 June 2006 (aged 16)	(Malian Football Federation) Etoiles-du-Mandé
5	DF	Issa Traoré	14 November 2007 (aged 15)	(Malian Football Federation) Djoliba
6	MF	Sékou Koné	3 February 2006 (aged 17)	(Malian Football Federation) Guidars
7	FW	Mahamadou Kante	30 March 2008 (aged 15)	(Malian Football Federation) Africa Foot
8	FW	Ibrahim Diarra	12 December 2006 (aged 16)	(Malian Football Federation) Africa Foot
9	FW	Salif Noah Leintu	20 June 2006 (aged 16)	(United States Soccer Federation) Bethesda SC
10	MF	Modibo Sissoko	17 December 2006 (aged 16)	(Malian Football Federation) Guidars
11	FW	Ibrahim Kanate	23 October 2006 (aged 16)	(Malian Football Federation) Afrique Football Élite
12	DF	Gaoussou Koné	22 November 2006 (aged 16)	(Malian Football Federation) Yeelen Olympique
13	DF	Souleymane Sanogo	1 October 2006 (aged 16)	(Malian Football Federation) Yeelen Olympique
14	MF	Ousmane Thiero	8 April 2006 (aged 17)	(Malian Football Federation) AS Bamako
15	DF	Moussa Traoré	30 December 2006 (aged 16)	(Malian Football Federation) CS Bamako
16	GK	Diaguine Sidibe	14 June 2006 (aged 16)	(Malian Football Federation) CS Bamako
17	FW	Mamadou Doumbia	18 February 2006 (aged 17)	(Malian Football Federation) Black Stars
18	MF	Moussa Massire Diop	1 September 2006 (aged 16)	(Malian Football Federation) JMG Bamako
19	MF	Mahammoud Barry	11 June 2006 (aged 16)	(Malian Football Federation) Etoiles-du-Mandé
20	MF	Ange Martial Tia	20 November 2006 (aged 16)	(Malian Football Federation) Afrique Football Élite
21	DF	Baye Coulibaly	8 January 2006 (aged 17)	(Malian Football Federation) Etoiles-du-Mandé
22	FW	Ousmane Diarra	25 October 2007 (aged 15)	(Senegalese Football Federation) Génération Foot
23	FW	Badra Traore	7 May 2006 (aged 16)	(French Football Federation) Metz
24	MF	Abdoulaye Gouba	31 January 2007 (aged 16)	(Malian Football Federation) Afrique Football Élite
25	GK	Seriba Doumbia	11 January 2007 (aged 16)	(Malian Football Federation) CS Bamako

=== South Sudan ===
No.	Pos.	Player	Date of birth (age)	Club
1	GK	Nasona Victor Elia Atoroyo	30 September 2006 (aged 16)	(South Sudan Football Association) Al Amal Academy
2	MF	Rewde Maliah Pitnyang Ngoan	10 February 2008 (aged 15)	(South Sudan Football Association) Future Stars Academy
3	DF	Otheno Alex Peter Peter	22 May 2008 (aged 14)	(South Sudan Football Association) BUL FC Youth
4	DF	David Mabil Ayuen Aguek	23 April 2006 (aged 17)	(South Sudan Football Association) Future Stars Academy
5	MF	Guet Duoth Guet	31 March 2006 (aged 17)	(South Sudan Football Association) Royaume University
7	FW	Jonathan Gem Majang Ajoung	15 November 2007 (aged 15)	(South Sudan Football Association) Al Amal Academy
8	MF	Mario Albano	23 April 2006 (aged 17)	(South Sudan Football Association) Future Stars Academy
9	FW	Gbindiva Victor Wilson Atilio	6 June 2008 (aged 14)	(South Sudan Football Association) Rock City Academy
10	MF	Rwothomio Innocent Odong Odong	2 April 2008 (aged 15)	(South Sudan Football Association) BUL FC Youth
11	FW	Godfry Geri Akulino Wani	2 June 2007 (aged 15)	(South Sudan Football Association) Future Stars Academy
12	DF	Philip Awad Mark Yapete	19 March 2007 (aged 16)	(South Sudan Football Association) Future Stars Academy
13	DF	Ngong Madut Yak Garang	11 January 2007 (aged 16)	(South Sudan Football Association) Kampala City Council Youth
14	MF	Bona Malek Majak Malek	11 October 2008 (aged 14)	(South Sudan Football Association) Amarat United FC
15	MF	Ajo Minari Alex Lomoro	9 January 2008 (aged 15)	(South Sudan Football Association) Future Stars Academy
16	GK	Samuel Duku Alberto James	11 March 2008 (aged 15)	(South Sudan Football Association) Future Stars Academy
17	FW	Lazarus Laku	29 May 2008 (aged 14)	(South Sudan Football Association) Future Stars Academy
18	MF	Philip Soka Ladu Wani	1 June 2006 (aged 16)	(South Sudan Football Association) Future Stars Academy
19	DF	Amos Moses Mondes Kanzolo	19 January 2007 (aged 16)	(South Sudan Football Association) Citizen Academy
20	DF	Emmanuel Nadir Adil Seberino	20 December 2008 (aged 14)	(South Sudan Football Association) Future Stars Academy
21	FW	Abraham Okeny Wilson Langoya	5 August 2006 (aged 16)	(South Sudan Football Association) Citizen Academy
22	MF	Sabir Mayor Wonlok James	26 December 2008 (aged 14)	(Federation of Uganda Football Associations) Arua Hill SC
23	GK	Benson Joseph Oring Nyibong	16 December 2006 (aged 16)	(Qatar Football Association) Al Sadd SC
24	DF	Ismail Remo Sampuli Mansuk	19 April 2008 (aged 15)	(Federation of Uganda Football Associations) Rays of Grace Soccer Academy
