= Loumana Department =

Coordinates: 10°35′N 5°21′W

Loumana
- Department
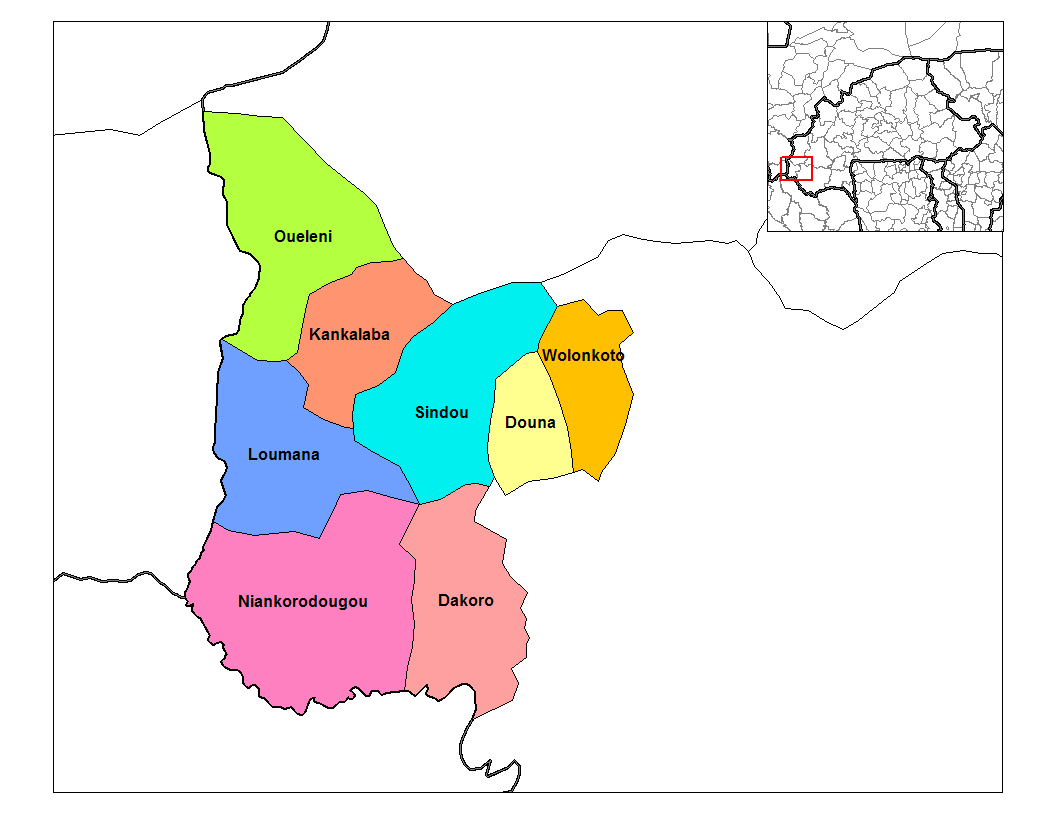
- Loumana Department location in the province
- Country: Burkina Faso
- Province: Léraba Province

Area
  - Total: 158 sq mi (408 km^{2})

Population (2019 census)
  - Total: 33,778
  - Density: 214/sq mi (82.8/km^{2})
- Time zone: UTC+0 (GMT 0)

Loumana is a department or commune of Léraba Province in south-western Burkina Faso. Its capital is the town of Loumana. According to the 2019 census the department has a total population of 33,778.

== Towns and villages ==
- Loumana (2 723 inhabitants) (capital)
- Baguera (5 030 inhabitants)
- Bledougou (424 inhabitants)
- Cissegue (748 inhabitants)
- Faon (384 inhabitants)
- Farniagara (186 inhabitants)
- Kangoura (2 286 inhabitants)
- Kinkinka (518 inhabitants)
- Koko (524 inhabitants)
- Lera (602 inhabitants)
- Loukouara (215 inhabitants)
- Negueni (1 056 inhabitants)
- Niansogoni (1 219 inhabitants)
- Noussoun (911 inhabitants)
- Ouahirmabougou (4 021 inhabitants)
- Outourou (680 inhabitants)
- Sourani (218 inhabitants)
- Tamassari (935 inhabitants)
