= Faon =

- Interactive map of Faon
- Coordinates: 10.7°N 5.4°W
- Country: Burkina Faso
- Region: Cascades Region
- Province: Léraba Province
- Department: Loumana Department

Population (2003)
  - Total: 384

Faon is a village in the Loumana Department of Léraba Province in western Burkina Faso. As of 2003, the village had a population of 384.
