= Dakoro Department =

Dakoro Department may refer to:

- Dakoro Department, Burkina Faso
- Dakoro Department, Niger
