= Douna Department =

Coordinates: 10°37′00″N 5°07′00″W

Douna
- Department
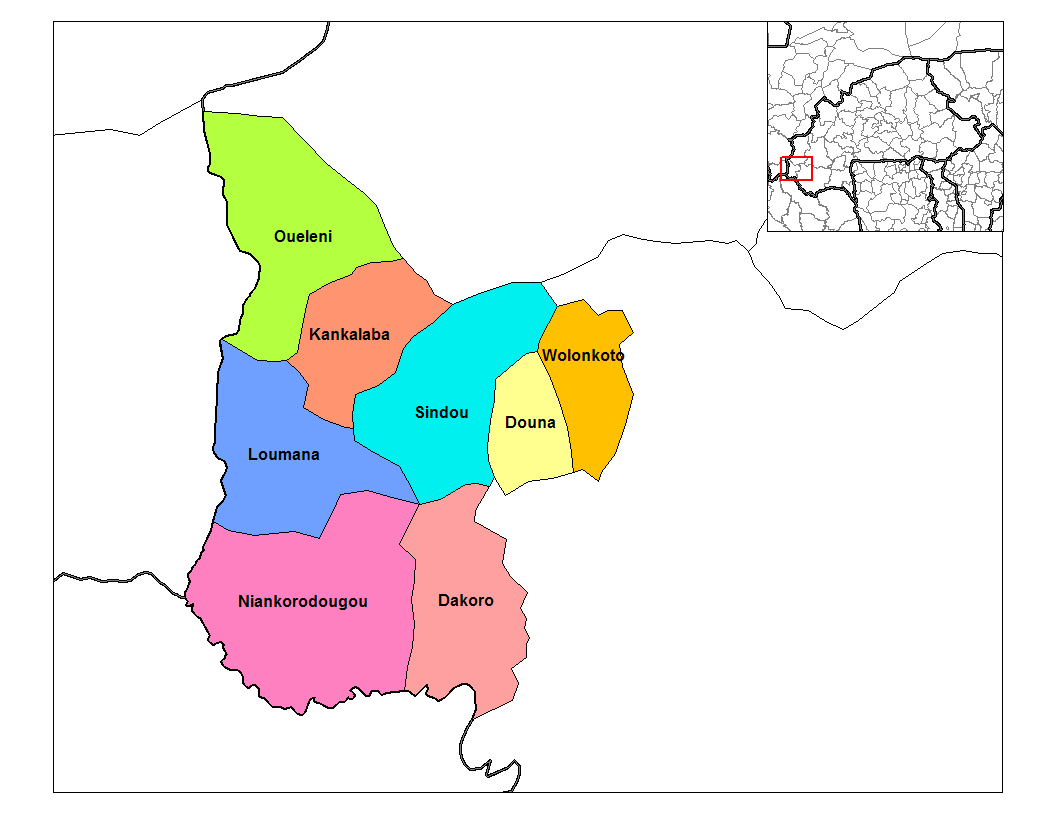
- Douna Department location in the province
- Country: Burkina Faso
- Province: Léraba Province

Population (1996)
  - Total: 9,132
- Time zone: UTC+0 (GMT 0)

Douna is a department or commune of Léraba Province in south-western Burkina Faso. Its capital lies at the town of Douna. According to the 1996 census the department has a total population of 9,132.

== Towns and villages ==
- Douna (4 249 inhabitants) (capital)
- Niofila (1 980 inhabitants)
- Manema (1 155 inhabitants)
- Monsona (1 101 inhabitants)
- Sabaribougou (334 inhabitants)
- Tassona (313 inhabitants)
