= Geography of Burkina Faso =

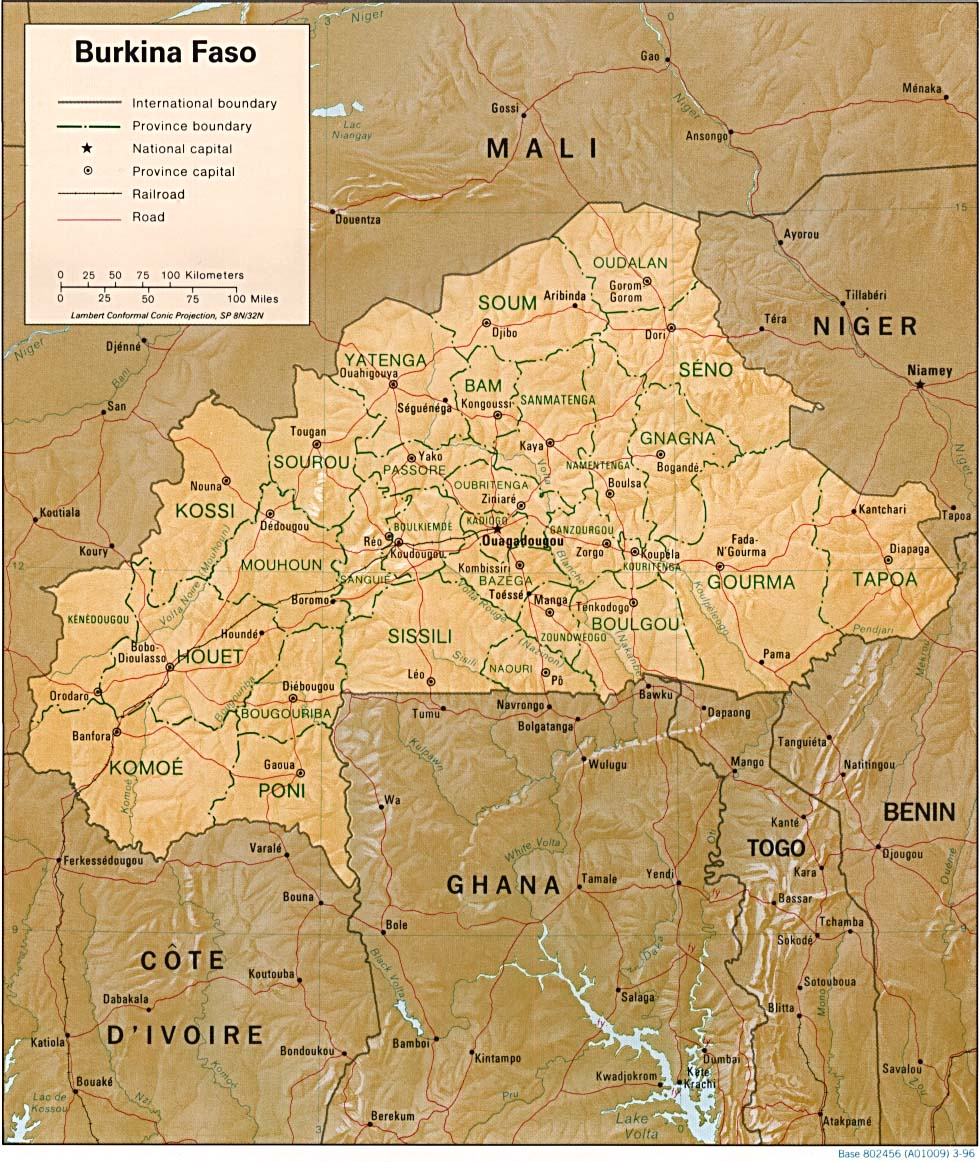
Map Of Burkina Faso

Location of Burkina Faso

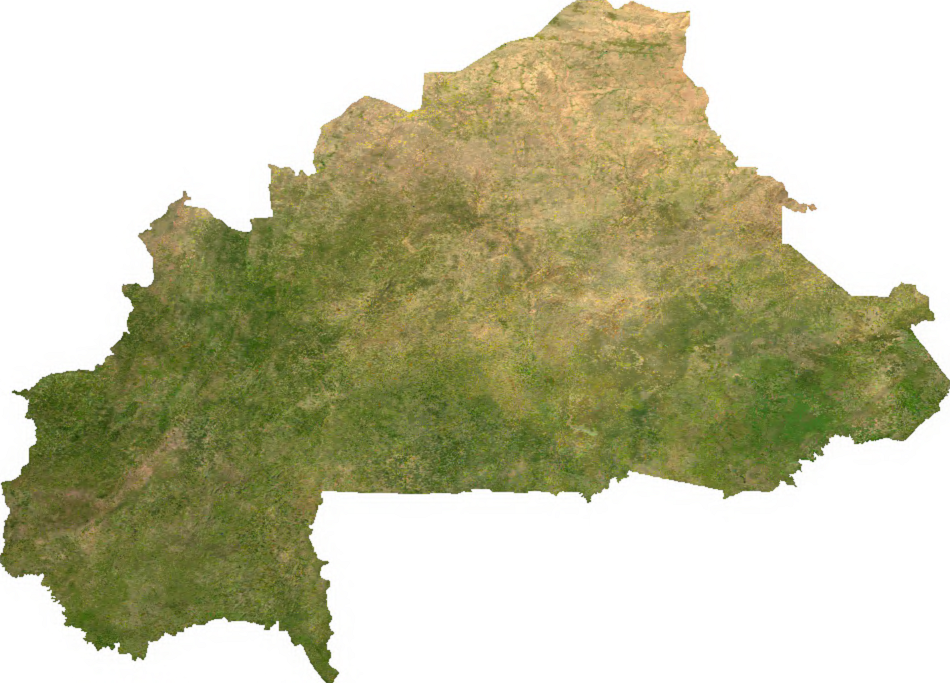
Satellite image of Burkina Faso

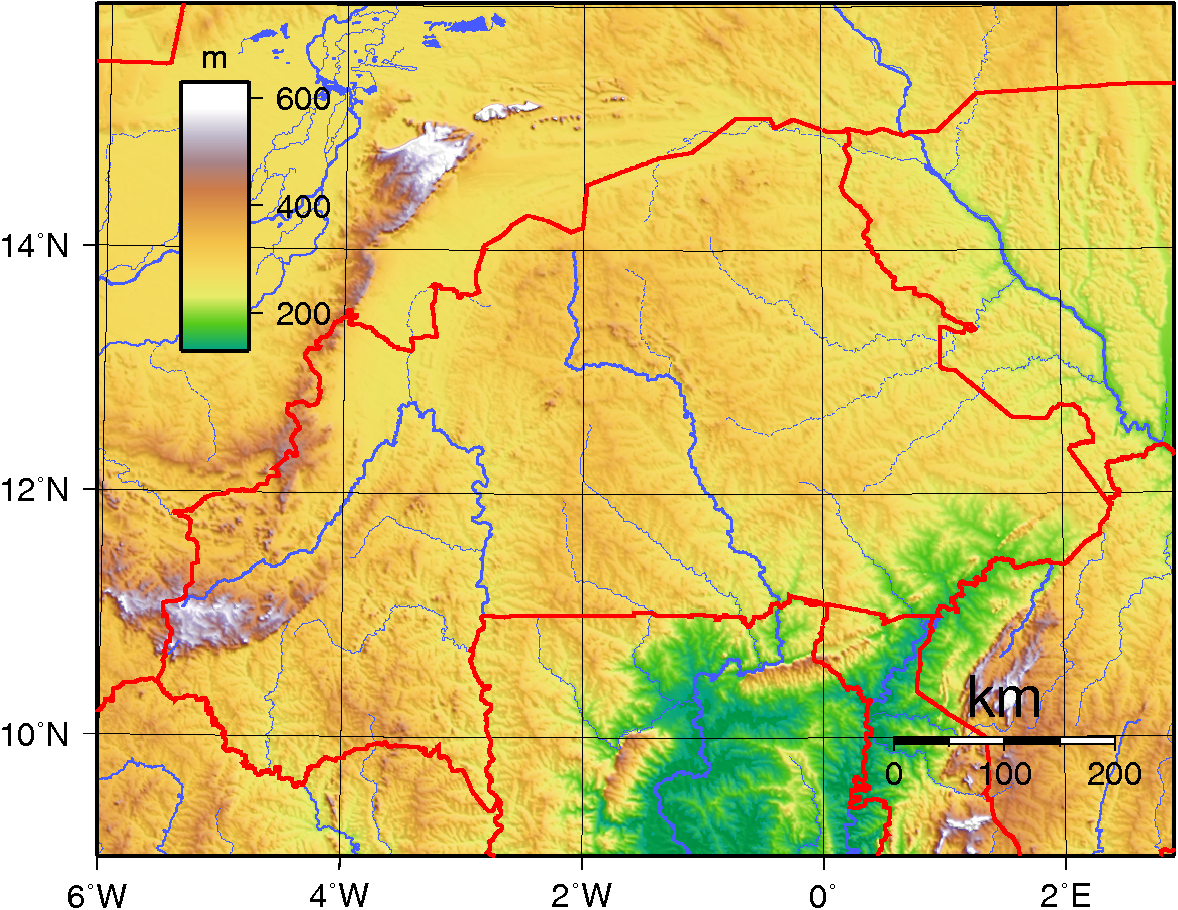
Topography of Burkina Faso

Burkina Faso (formerly Upper Volta) is a landlocked Sahel country that shares borders with six nations. It lies between the Sahara desert and the Gulf of Guinea, south of the loop of the Niger River, mostly between latitudes 9° and 15°N (a small area is north of 15°), and longitudes 6°W and 3°E. The land is green in the south, with forests and fruit trees, and semi-arid in the north. Most of central Burkina Faso lies on a savanna plateau, 198–305 metres (650–1,001 ft) above sea level, with fields, brush, and scattered trees. Burkina Faso's game preserves – the most important of which are Arly, Nazinga, and W National Park—contain lions, elephants, hippopotamus, monkeys, common warthogs, and antelopes. Previously the endangered painted hunting dog, Lycaon pictus occurred in Burkina Faso, but, although the last sightings were made in Arli National Park, the species is considered extirpated from Burkina Faso.

== Area ==
Burkina Faso has a total area of 274,200 km^{2} (105,870 sq mi), of which 273,800 km^{2} (105,710 sq mi) is land and 400 km^{2} (150 sq mi) water. Comparatively, it is slightly larger than New Zealand and Colorado. Its borders total 3,611 kilometres (2,244 mi): Benin 386 kilometres (240 mi), Ivory Coast 545 kilometres (339 mi), Ghana 602 kilometres (374 mi), Mali 1,325 kilometres (823 mi), Niger 622 kilometres (386 mi), and Togo 131 kilometres (81 mi). It has no coastline or maritime claims.

=== Extreme points ===
This is a list of the extreme points of Burkina Faso, the points that are farther north, south, east or west than any other location.

- Northernmost point – unnamed location on the border with Mali, Sahel Region
- Easternmost point – unnamed location on the border with Benin immediately south of the Burkina Faso-Benin-Niger tripoint, Est Region
- Southernmost point – unnamed location on the border with Ivory Coast immediately south of the village of Kpuere, Sud-Ouest Region
- Westernmost point – the tripoint with Mali and Ivory Coast, Cascades Region

== Terrain ==
It is made up of two major types of countryside. The larger part of the country is covered by a peneplain, which forms a gently undulating landscape with, in some areas, a few isolated hills, the last vestiges of a Precambrian massif. The southwest of the country, on the other hand, forms a sandstone massif, where the highest peak, Ténakourou, is found at an elevation of 749 metres (2,457 feet). The massif is bordered by sheer cliffs up to 150 meters (490 feet) high. The average altitude of Burkina Faso is 400 meters (1,300 feet) and the difference between the highest and lowest terrain is no greater than 600 metres (2,000 feet). Burkina Faso is therefore a relatively flat country. Its elevation extremes are a lowest point at the Mouhoun (Black Volta) River (200 metres or 656 feet) and highest point at Tena Kourou (749 metres or 2,457 feet).

== Administrative divisions ==
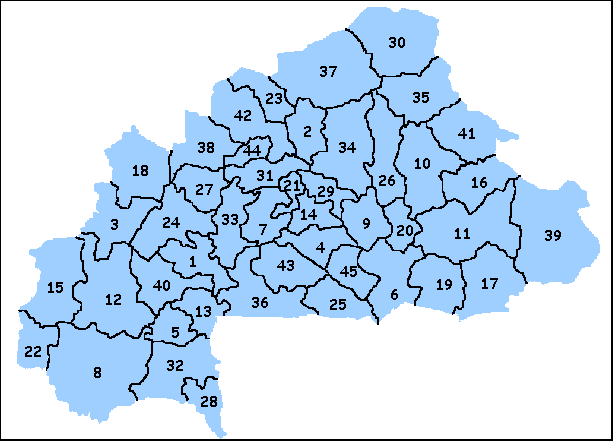
Provinces of Burkina Faso

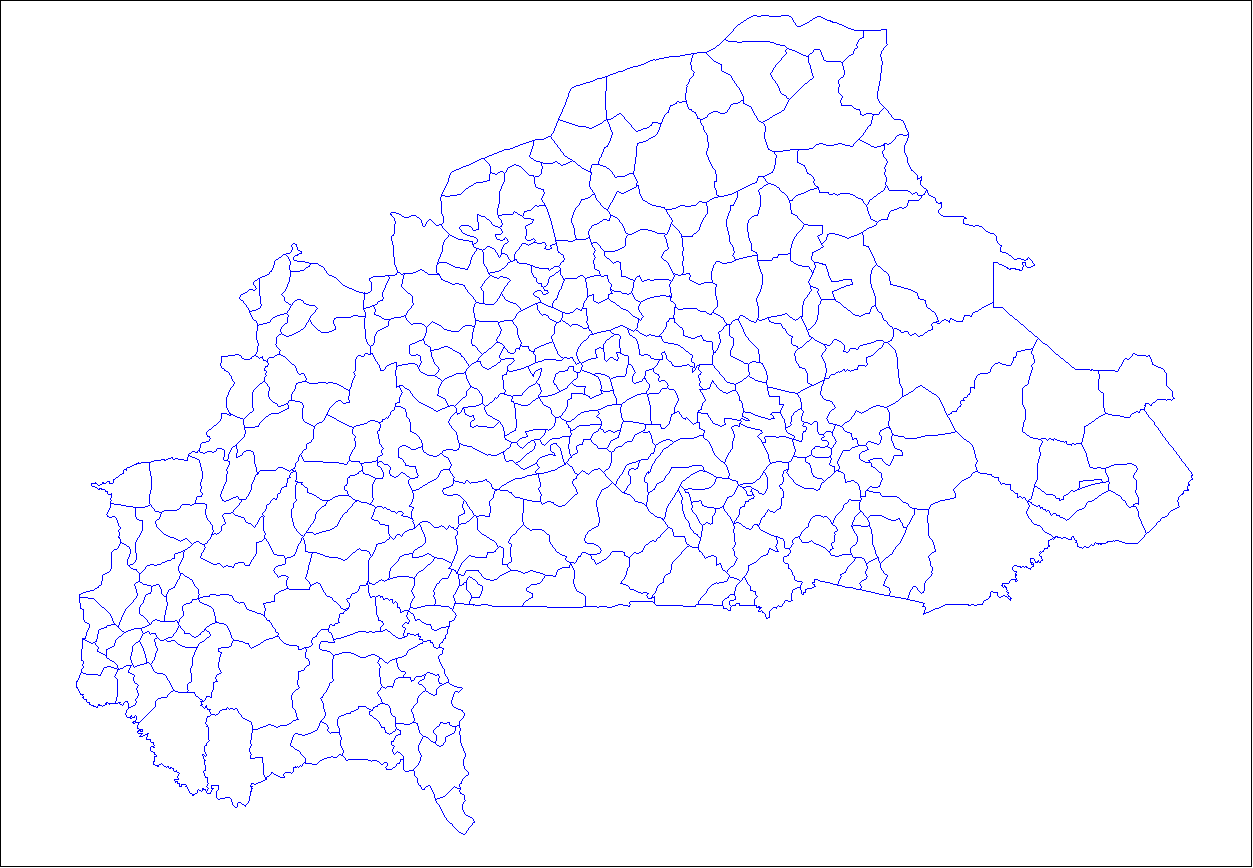
Departments of Burkina Faso

The country is divided into 13 administrative regions. These regions encompass 45 provinces and 351 departments.

== Hydrography ==
The country owes its former name of Upper Volta to three rivers which cross it: the Black Volta (or Mouhoun), the White Volta (Nakambé) and the Red Volta (Nazinon). The Black Volta is one of the country's only two rivers which flow year-round, the other being the Komoé, which flows to the southwest. The basin of the Niger River also drains 27% of the country's surface.

The Niger's tributaries – the Béli, the Gorouol, the Goudébo and the Dargol – are seasonal streams and flow for only four to six months a year. They still, however, can cause large floods. The country also contains numerous lakes – the principal ones are Tingrela, Bam and Dem. The country contains large ponds, as well, such as Oursi, Béli, Yomboli and Markoye. Water shortages are often a problem, especially in the north of the country.

== Climate ==
Köppen climate classification map of Burkina Faso

Burkina Faso has a primarily tropical climate with two very distinct seasons. In the rainy season, the country receives between 600 and 900 millimetres (23.6 and 35.4 in) of rainfall; in the dry season, the harmattan – a hot dry wind from the Sahara – blows. The rainy season lasts approximately four months, May/June to September, and is shorter in the north of the country. Three climatic zones can be defined: the Sahel, the Sudan-Sahel, and the Sudan-Guinea. The Sahel in the north typically receives less than 600 millimeters (24 inches) of rainfall per year and has high temperatures, 5–47 degrees Celsius (41–117 degrees Fahrenheit).

A relatively dry tropical savanna, the Sahel extends beyond the borders of Burkina Faso, from the Horn of Africa to the Atlantic Ocean, and borders the Sahara to its north and the fertile region of the Sudan to the South. Situated between 11°3' and 13°5' north latitude, the Sudan-Sahel region is a transitional zone with regards to rainfall and temperature. Further to the south, the Sudan-Guinea zone receives more than 900 millimeters (35 inches) of rain each year and has cooler average temperatures.

Climate data for Ouagadougou (1971–2000 normals, extremes 1902–present)
Month	Jan	Feb	Mar	Apr	May	Jun	Jul	Aug	Sep	Oct	Nov	Dec	Year
Record high °C (°F)	39.8 (103.6)	42.3 (108.1)	43.8 (110.8)	46.1 (115.0)	44.5 (112.1)	41.3 (106.3)	38.8 (101.8)	36.6 (97.9)	38.6 (101.5)	41.0 (105.8)	40.5 (104.9)	40.1 (104.2)	46.1 (115.0)
Mean daily maximum °C (°F)	32.9 (91.2)	35.8 (96.4)	38.3 (100.9)	39.3 (102.7)	37.7 (99.9)	34.7 (94.5)	32.1 (89.8)	31.1 (88.0)	32.5 (90.5)	35.6 (96.1)	35.9 (96.6)	33.4 (92.1)	34.9 (94.8)
Mean daily minimum °C (°F)	16.5 (61.7)	19.1 (66.4)	23.5 (74.3)	26.4 (79.5)	26.1 (79.0)	24.1 (75.4)	22.8 (73.0)	22.2 (72.0)	22.4 (72.3)	23.0 (73.4)	19.6 (67.3)	16.9 (62.4)	21.9 (71.4)
Record low °C (°F)	8.5 (47.3)	10.4 (50.7)	14.8 (58.6)	16.2 (61.2)	17.0 (62.6)	17.0 (62.6)	15.0 (59.0)	17.9 (64.2)	17.6 (63.7)	17.6 (63.7)	13.0 (55.4)	9.5 (49.1)	8.5 (47.3)
Average rainfall mm (inches)	0.1 (0.00)	0.5 (0.02)	5.9 (0.23)	26.5 (1.04)	66.8 (2.63)	97.5 (3.84)	176.2 (6.94)	214.2 (8.43)	121.2 (4.77)	33.5 (1.32)	1.2 (0.05)	0.2 (0.01)	743.8 (29.28)
Average rainy days (≥ 0.1 mm)	0	0	1	3	8	10	14	16	11	5	0	0	68
Average relative humidity (%)	24	21	22	36	50	64	72	80	77	60	38	29	48
Mean monthly sunshine hours	287	263	264	256	277	264	240	223	217	273	288	284	3,136
Source 1: World Meteorological Organization, Meteo Climat (record highs and lows)
Source 2: Deutscher Wetterdienst (humidity, 1961–1967, and sun, 1961–1990) (Note: Station ID for Ouagadougou is 65503 Use this station ID to locate the sunshine duration)

Climate data for Bobo-Dioulasso (1971–2000 normals)
Month	Jan	Feb	Mar	Apr	May	Jun	Jul	Aug	Sep	Oct	Nov	Dec	Year
Record high °C (°F)	39.0 (102.2)	40.1 (104.2)	46.0 (114.8)	42.0 (107.6)	41.3 (106.3)	37.5 (99.5)	35.0 (95.0)	34.8 (94.6)	35.5 (95.9)	37.4 (99.3)	38.0 (100.4)	37.3 (99.1)	46.0 (114.8)
Mean daily maximum °C (°F)	32.5 (90.5)	35.0 (95.0)	36.5 (97.7)	36.5 (97.7)	34.5 (94.1)	31.7 (89.1)	29.7 (85.5)	29.1 (84.4)	30.4 (86.7)	33.0 (91.4)	34.1 (93.4)	32.5 (90.5)	33.0 (91.4)
Mean daily minimum °C (°F)	18.7 (65.7)	21.4 (70.5)	24.0 (75.2)	24.8 (76.6)	23.8 (74.8)	22.1 (71.8)	21.3 (70.3)	21.0 (69.8)	21.0 (69.8)	21.7 (71.1)	20.6 (69.1)	18.8 (65.8)	21.6 (70.9)
Record low °C (°F)	11.0 (51.8)	11.0 (51.8)	11.5 (52.7)	13.0 (55.4)	17.5 (63.5)	17.8 (64.0)	17.0 (62.6)	16.7 (62.1)	15.5 (59.9)	17.0 (62.6)	12.8 (55.0)	10.0 (50.0)	10.0 (50.0)
Average rainfall mm (inches)	0.9 (0.04)	3.4 (0.13)	17.4 (0.69)	45.8 (1.80)	102.1 (4.02)	130.8 (5.15)	195.5 (7.70)	268.5 (10.57)	170.1 (6.70)	57.7 (2.27)	7.7 (0.30)	1.2 (0.05)	1,001.1 (39.42)
Average rainy days (≥ 0.1 mm)	0	0	3	5	9	11	15	19	15	7	1	0	85
Average relative humidity (%)	25	25	32	49	63	72	78	82	79	69	51	32	55
Mean monthly sunshine hours	282	248	249	232	262	234	199	182	209	254	271	264	2,886
Source 1: World Meteorological Organization
Source 2: Deutscher Wetterdienst (extremes, humidity and sun, 1961–1990) (Note: Station ID for Bobo-Dioulasso is 65510 Use this station ID to locate the sunshine duration)

== Resources and environment ==
Burkina Faso's natural resources include manganese, limestone, marble, phosphates, pumice, salt and small deposits of gold. 21.93% of its land is arable, and 0.26% has permanent crops as of 2012. As of 2003, 250 km^{2} were irrigated. Its total renewable water resources as of 2011 were 12.5 m^{3}, with a total freshwater withdrawal of 0.72 km^{3}/yr (46% domestic, 3% industrial, 51% agricultural; this amounts to a per-capita withdrawal of 54.99 m^{3}/yr.

Burkina Faso's fauna and flora are protected in two national parks and several reserves: see List of national parks in Africa, Nature reserves of Burkina Faso.

Recurring droughts and floods are a significant natural hazard. Current environmental issues include: recent droughts and desertification severely affecting agricultural activities, population distribution, and the economy; overgrazing; soil degradation; deforestation.

Burkina Faso is party to the following international environmental agreements: Biodiversity, Climate Change, Desertification, Endangered Species, Hazardous Wastes, Marine Life Conservation, Ozone Layer Protection, Wetlands. It has signed, but not ratified, the Law of the Sea and the Nuclear Test Ban.

== Deforestation ==
In Burkina Faso forest cover is around 23% of the total land area, equivalent to 6,216,400 hectares (ha) of forest in 2020, down from 7,716,600 hectares (ha) in 1990. In 2020, naturally regenerating forest covered 6,039,300 hectares (ha) and planted forest covered 177,100 hectares (ha). Of the naturally regenerating forest 0% was reported to be primary forest (consisting of native tree species with no clearly visible indications of human activity) and around 16% of the forest area was found within protected areas. For the year 2015, 100% of the forest area was reported to be under public ownership.

=== REDD+ reference levels and monitoring ===
Under the UNFCCC REDD+ framework, Burkina Faso has submitted national forest reference levels (FRLs). On the UNFCCC REDD+ Web Platform, the country's 2020 submission is listed as having an assessed reference level of 10,218,000 t CO2 eq per year, while a revised 2025 submission is listed as under technical assessment. The platform also lists a first National REDD+ Strategy submitted in 2022 and a second strategy and REDD+ action plan submitted in 2025.

The assessed 2020 FRL, modified during the technical assessment, covered the REDD+ activities “reducing emissions from deforestation”, “reducing emissions from forest degradation” and “enhancement of forest carbon stocks” for the reference period 1995–2017. The technical assessment reported that the benchmark included above-ground biomass, below-ground biomass, deadwood and soil organic carbon, while excluding litter. It also included CO2 emissions and removals associated with changes in carbon pools and CO2, methane (CH_{4}) and nitrous oxide (N_{2}O) emissions from bush fires. Burkina Faso used a forest definition of land of at least 0.5 hectares with tree height of at least 2 metres and canopy cover of at least 10%.

A revised submission made in 2025 proposes an updated national FRL for 2000–2013. According to the submission, it uses activity data produced with Collect Earth, continues to cover deforestation and forest degradation, and broadens enhancement of forest carbon stocks to include forest land remaining forest land, a change described as responding to recommendations from the 2020 technical assessment. The submission reports an average FRL of 13,787,040 t CO2 eq per year and an overall uncertainty of 2.74%, but this revised benchmark was still under technical assessment on the UNFCCC platform.

== See also ==
- 2010 Sahel famine
- Category:Treaties of Burkina Faso
