= Léraba Province =

Coordinates: 10°40′N 5°12′W

Léraba
- Province
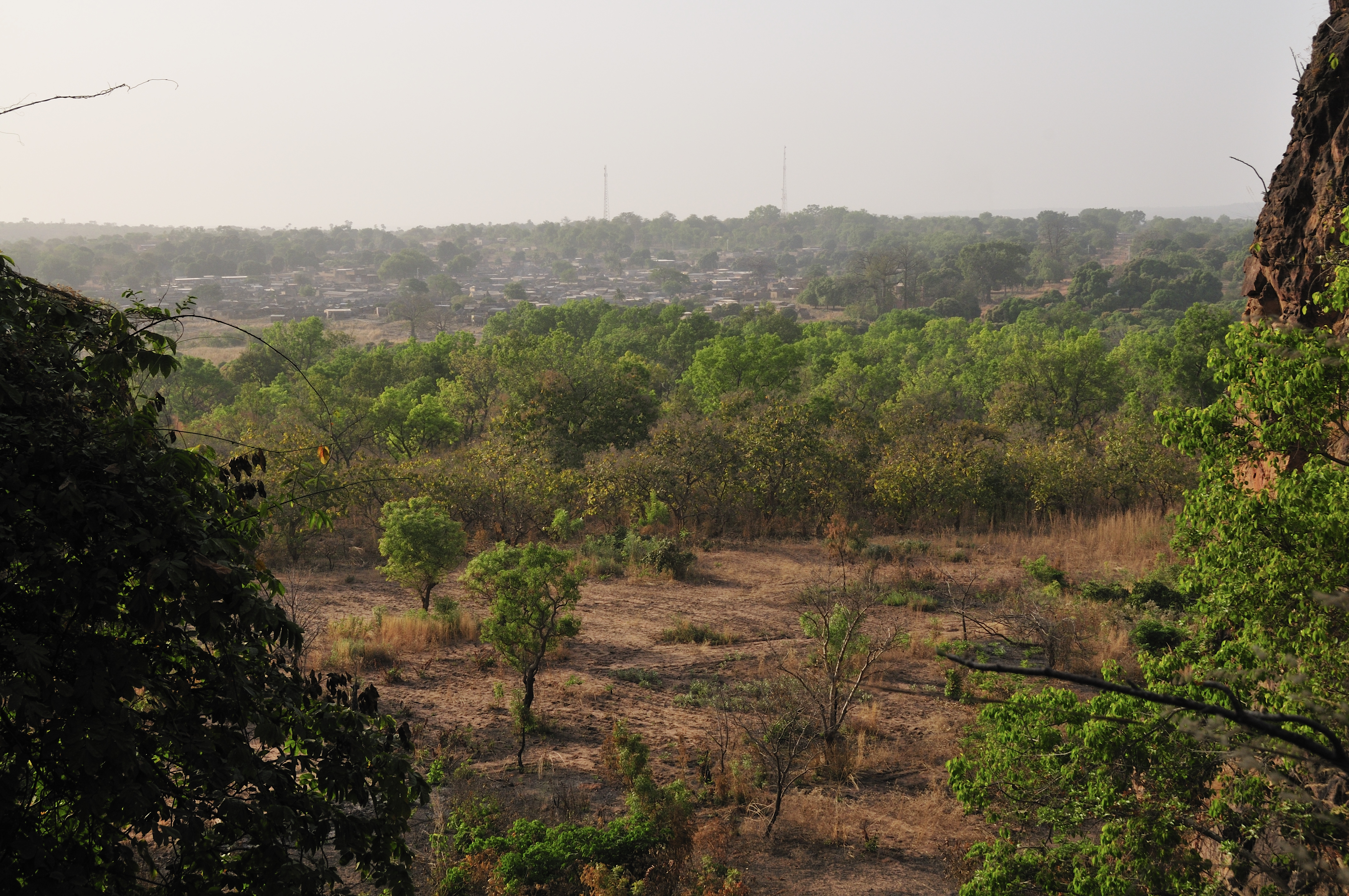
- View of the town of Sindou, capital of Léraba Province

- Location in Burkina Faso

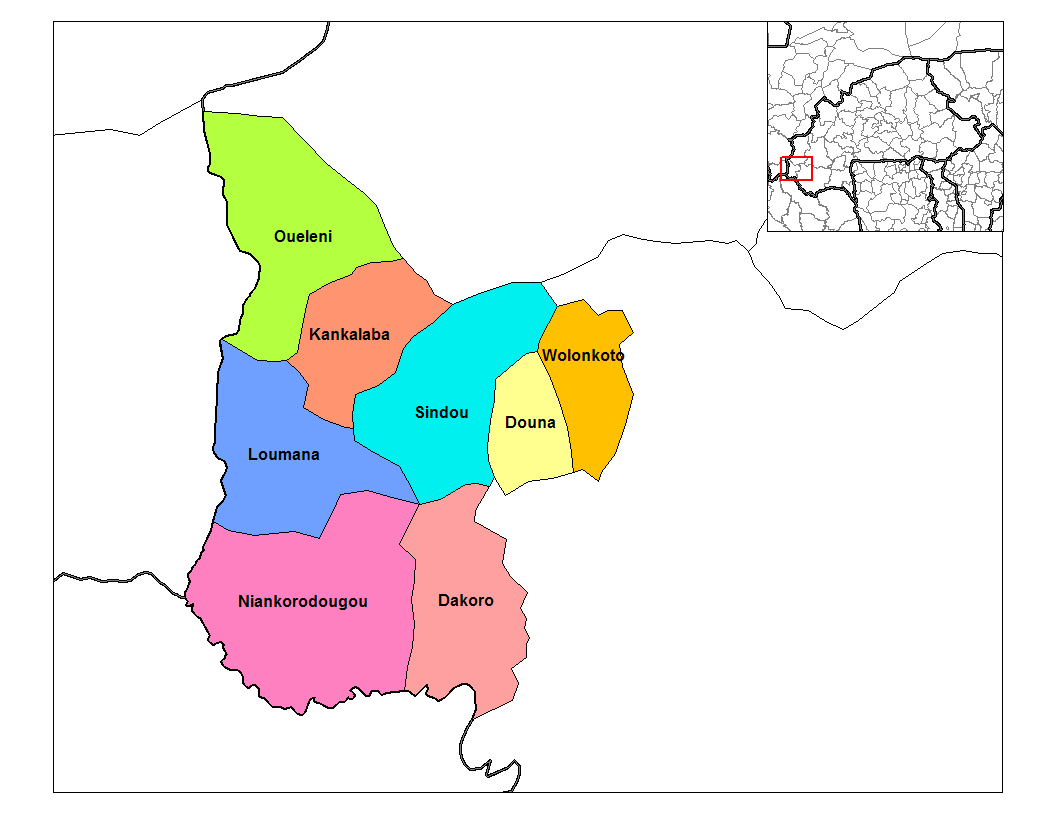
- Provincial map of its departments
- Country: Burkina Faso
- Region: Cascades Region
- Capital: Sindou

Area
  - Province: 3,132 km^{2} (1,209 sq mi)

Population (2019)
  - Province: 179,367
  - Density: 57.27/km^{2} (148.3/sq mi)
  - Urban: 7,053
- Time zone: UTC+0 (GMT 0)

Léraba is one of the 45 provinces of Burkina Faso, located in its Cascades Region.

Its capital is Sindou. Its highest point (and the highest point of the country) is Mount Tenakourou with an elevation of 747 metres (2,451 ft).

== Departments ==
Leraba is divided into 8 departments:

The Departments of Léraba
Department	Capital city	Population (Census 2006)
Dakoro Department	Dakoro	13,204
Douna Department	Douna	9,025
Kankalaba Department	Kankalaba	9,675
Loumana Department	Loumana	23,955
Niankorodougou Department	Niankorodougou	34,196
Oueleni Department	Oueleni	12,130
Sindou Department	Sindou	18,484
Wolonkoto Department	Wolonkoto	3,753

== See also ==
- Regions of Burkina Faso
- Provinces of Burkina Faso
- Departments of Burkina Faso
