= Wolonkoto Department =

Coordinates: 10°41′N 4°58′W

Wolonkoto
- Department
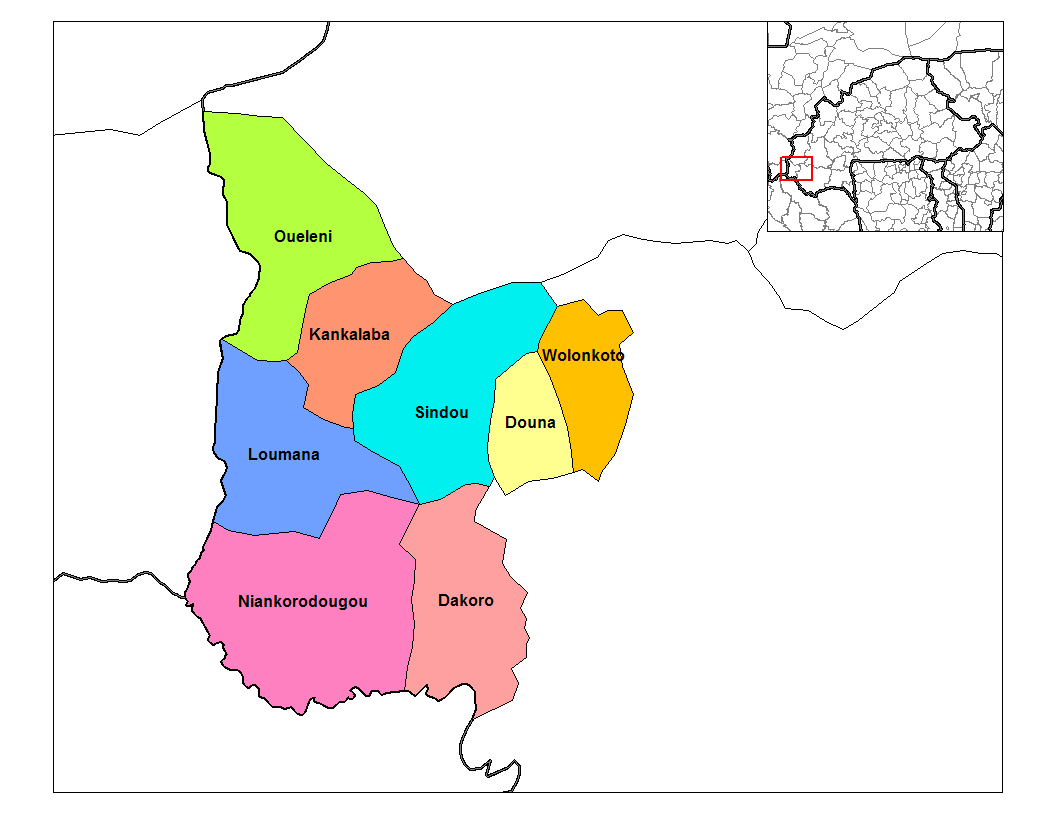
- Wolonkoto Department location in the province
- Country: Burkina Faso
- Province: Léraba Province

Area
  - Total: 98.5 sq mi (255.1 km^{2})

Population (2019)
  - Total: 5,504
  - Density: 55.88/sq mi (21.58/km^{2})
- Time zone: UTC+0 (GMT 0)

Wolonkoto is a small department or commune of Léraba Province in south-western Burkina Faso. Its capital lies at the town of Wolonkoto. According to the 2019 census the department has a total population of 5,504.

== Towns and villages ==
- Wolonkoto (2 694 inhabitants) (capital)
- Malon (993 inhabitants)
