= Sindou Department =

Coordinates: 10.6561°N 5.1636°W

Sindou
- Department
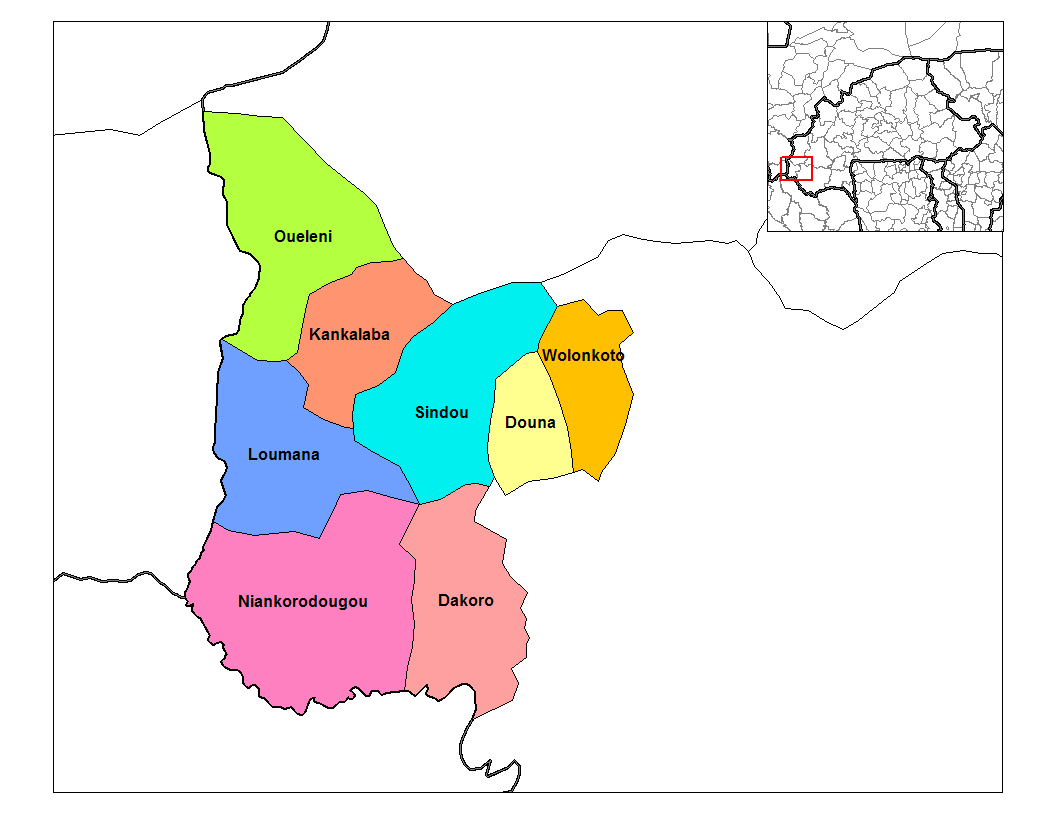
- Sindou Department location in the province
- Country: Burkina Faso
- Province: Léraba Province

Area
  - Land: 156 sq mi (403 km^{2})

Population (2019 census)
  - Department: 25,753
  - Density: 166/sq mi (63.9/km^{2})
  - Urban: 7,053
- Time zone: UTC+0 (GMT 0)

Sindou is a department or commune of Léraba Province in south-western Burkina Faso. Its capital is the town of Sindou.
