= Ouéléni Department =

Coordinates: 10°51′N 5°21′W

Ouéleni
- Department
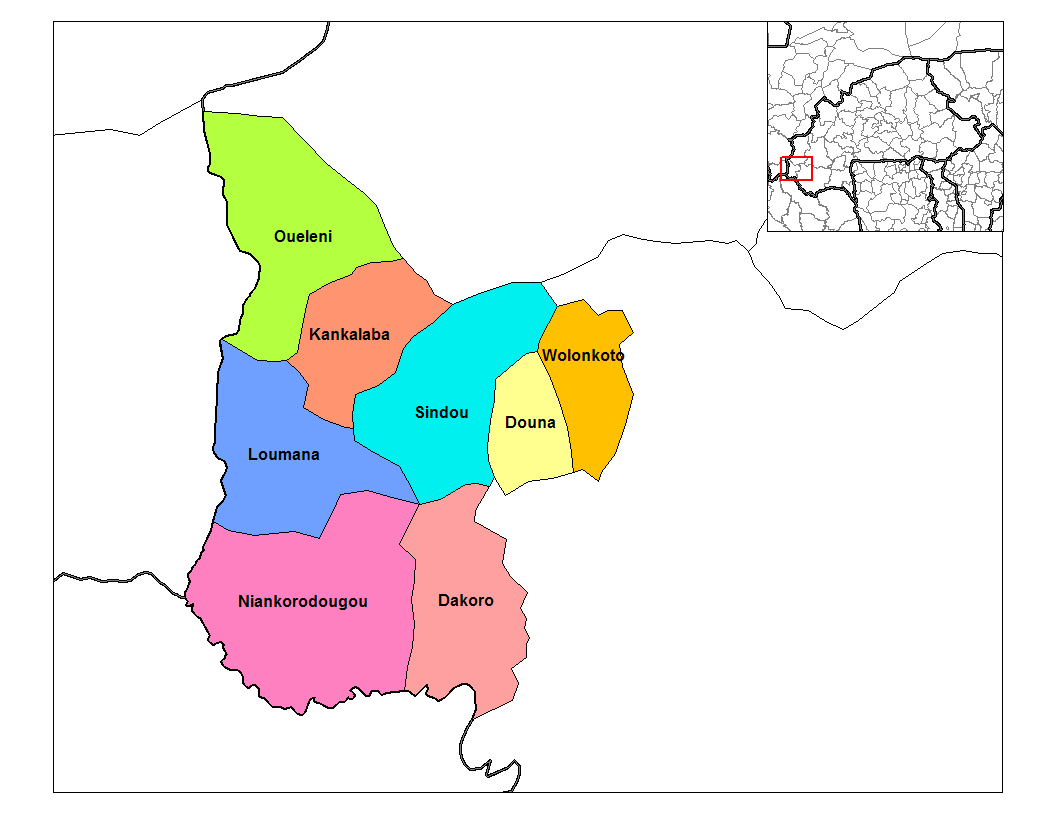
- Ouéleni Department location in the province
- Country: Burkina Faso
- Province: Léraba Province

Area
  - Total: 153.7 sq mi (398.2 km^{2})

Population (2019 census)
  - Total: 17,993
  - Density: 117.0/sq mi (45.19/km^{2})
- Time zone: UTC+0 (GMT 0)

Ouéleni is a department or commune of Léraba Province in south-western Burkina Faso. Its capital lies at the town of Ouéleni. According to the 2019 census the department has a total population of 17,993.

== Towns and villages ==
- Ouéleni (911 inhabitants) (capital)
- Bebougou (567 inhabitants)
- Botogo (405 inhabitants)
- Foloni (650 inhabitants)
- Kinga (260 inhabitants)
- Kobadah (1 290 inhabitants)
- Namboena (303 inhabitants)
- Outila (1 136 inhabitants)
- Pelignan (443 inhabitants)
- Sarkandiala (1 097 inhabitants)
- Sele (208 inhabitants)
- Sountourkou (657 inhabitants)
- Tena (1 464 inhabitants)
- Tiongo (629 inhabitants)
- Ballerville (22 inhabitants)
