= Tamassari =

Town in western Burkina Faso

Coordinates: 10.6500°N 5.3333°W

Tamassari is a town in western Burkina Faso near Sindou and near the border with Mali.
