= Niankorodougou Department =

Coordinates: 10°27′N 5°18′W

Niankorodougou
- Department
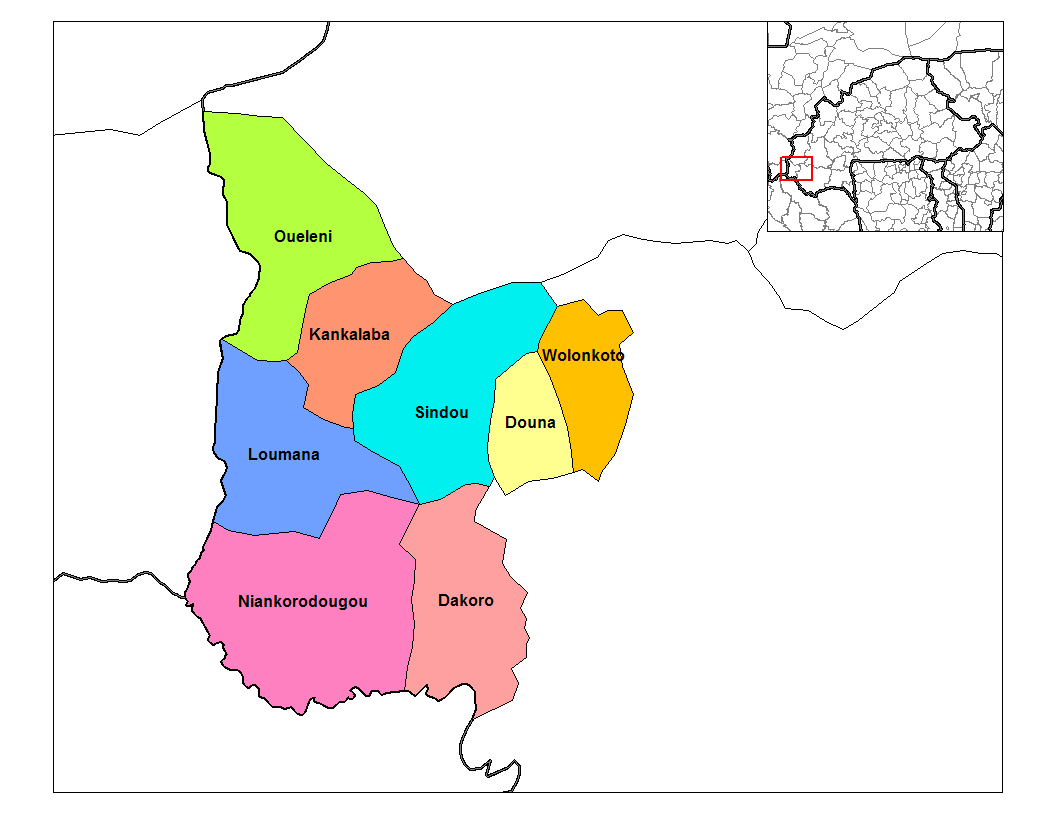
- Niankorodougou Department location in the province
- Country: Burkina Faso
- Province: Léraba Province

Area
  - Total: 250 sq mi (650 km^{2})

Population (2019 census)
  - Total: 51,576
  - Density: 210/sq mi (79/km^{2})
- Time zone: UTC+0 (GMT 0)

Niankorodougou is a department or commune of Léraba Province in south-western Burkina Faso. Its capital is the town of Niankorodougou. According to the 2019 census, the department has a total population of 51,576.

== Towns and villages ==
- Niankorodougou (3,707 inhabitants) (capital)
- Bassoungoro (1,182 inhabitants)
- Bavigué-Ka (1,530 inhabitants)
- Blesso (415 inhabitants)
- Bozogo (2,755 inhabitants)
- Djondougou (1,232 inhabitants)
- Fourkoura (2,737 inhabitants)
- Kagbogora (1,829 inhabitants)
- Katolo (1,420 inhabitants)
- Kawolo (3,809 inhabitants)
- Nadjengoala (2,213 inhabitants)
- Naguélédougou (988 inhabitants)
- Nerfindougou (2,096 inhabitants)
- Salentene (929 inhabitants)
- Tagouassoni (1,564 inhabitants)
- Zegnedougou (3,203 inhabitants)
