= Kankalaba Department =

Coordinates: 10°45′N 5°17′W

Kankalaba
- Department
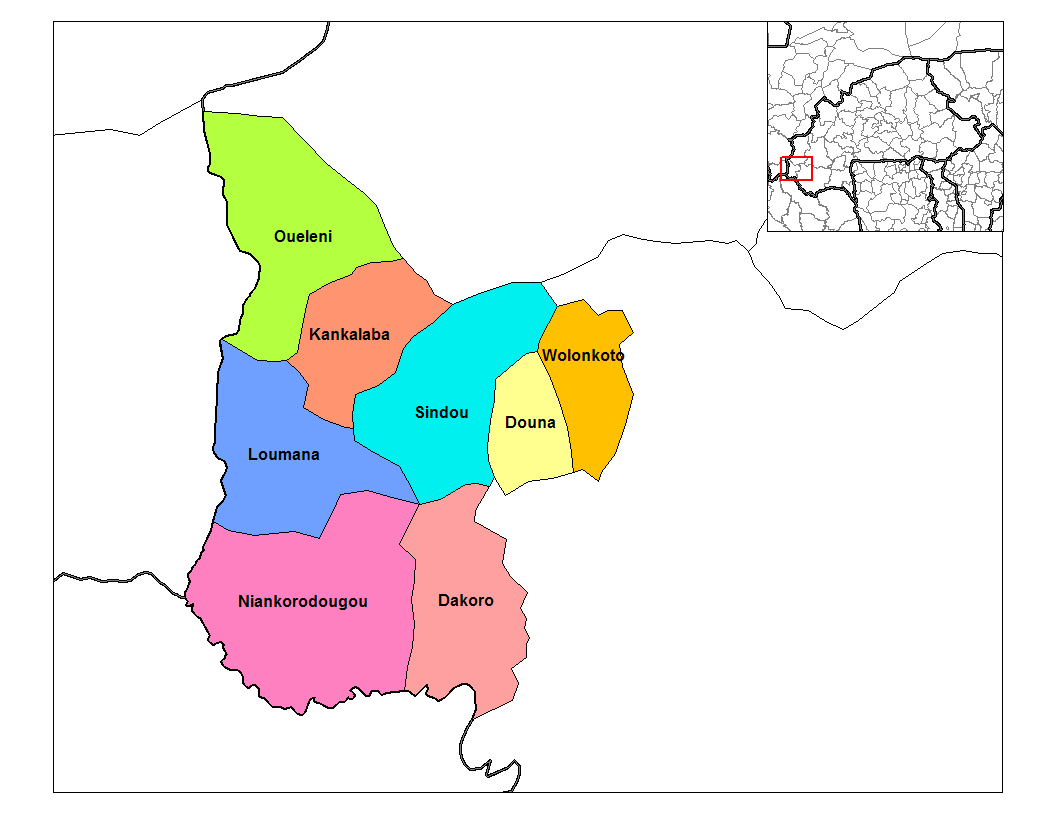
- Kankalaba Department location in the province
- Country: Burkina Faso
- Province: Léraba Province

Area
  - Total: 121.0 sq mi (313.4 km^{2})

Population (2019 census)
  - Total: 12,592
  - Density: 104.1/sq mi (40.18/km^{2})
- Time zone: UTC+0 (GMT 0)

Kankalaba is a department or commune of Léraba Province in south-western Burkina Faso, a landlocked country in west Africa. Its capital lies at the town of Kankalaba. According to the 2019 census the department has a total population of 12,592.

== Towns and villages ==
- Kankalaba (1 633 inhabitants) (capital)
- Bougoula (1 652 inhabitants)
- Dagban (1 854 inhabitants)
- Dionso (716 inhabitants)
- Fassaladougou (256 inhabitants)
- Kaniagara (849 inhabitants)
- Kolasso (1 210 inhabitants)
- Niantono (1 029 inhabitants)
