= Royma =

Sindhi Rajput tribe from India

The Rahimoon (Sindhi: راهمون/راھومو), Rahuma, Royma is a Sindhi Sammat Rajput tribe found in the Pakistani districts of Umarkot, Chachro, Tharparkar and Sanghar in Sindh. Whilst in India they habitat in Rajasthan and Gujarat states of India, in Gujarat they are found in the Banni region of Kutch. and in Rajasthan mostly in Barmer and Jaisalmer.

== Clans ==
Atha, Bhirkio, Gaho, Gharia, Ghuria (Ghuriani), Gaidani, Halo, Jumra, Jarera, Jamaria, Mama, Mahowa, Malhu, Rukhan, Sadhia, Sadhayo, Saadar (Sadoro), Saar, Sabugar, Sahab, Sahabdin.
