= Sindou =

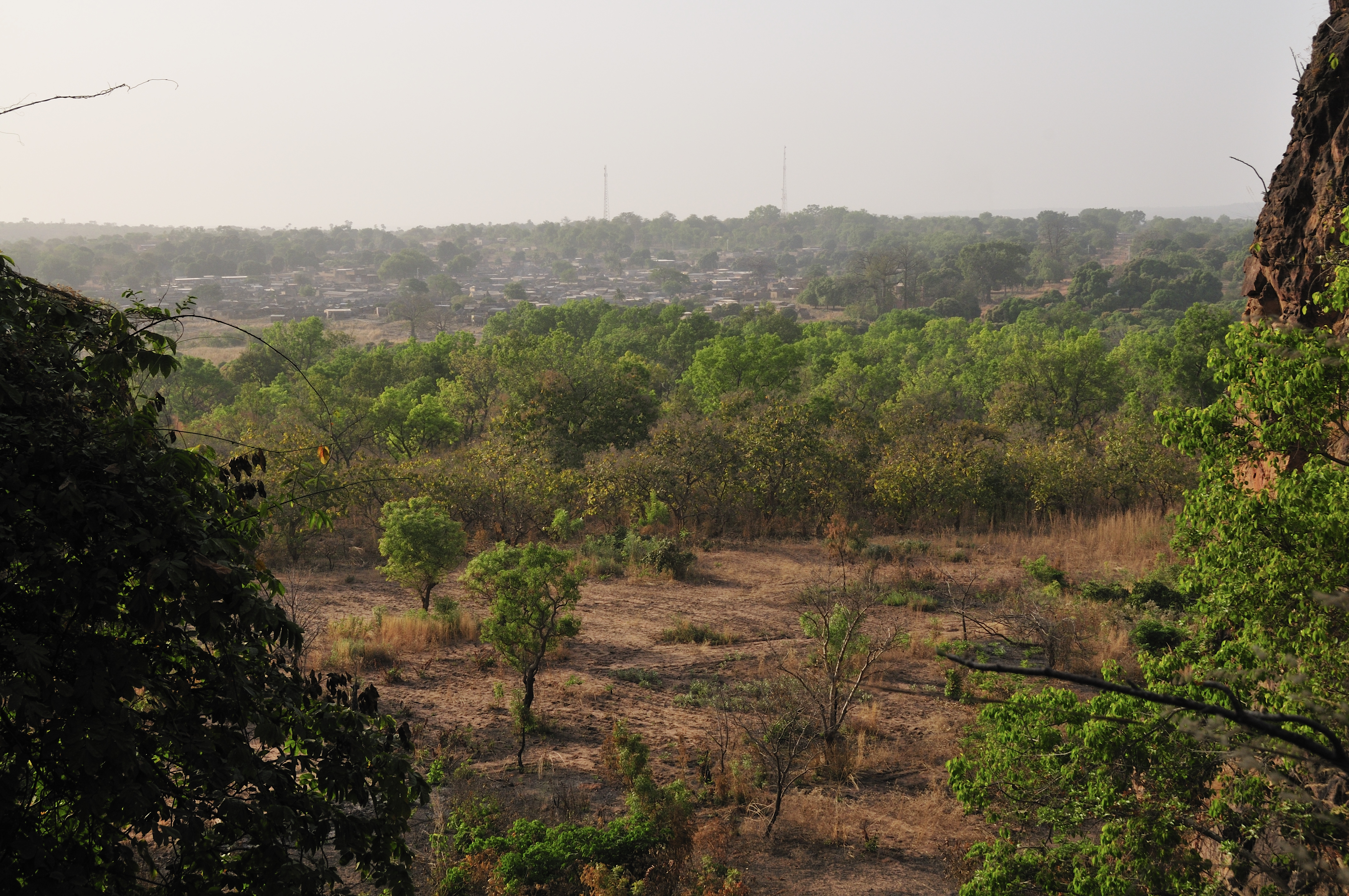
- Skyline of the town of Sindou from the "Pics de Sindou"

- Location within Burkina Faso
- Coordinates: 10°39′N 5°10′W
- Country: Burkina Faso
- Region: Cascades Region
- Province: Léraba Province

Population (2019 census)
  - Total: 7,053
- Time zone: UTC+0 (GMT)

Sindou is a town located in the province of Léraba in Burkina Faso. It is the capital of Léraba Province and the Sindou Department.

The region is known for the Pics de Sindou, a sharp sandstone geological formation. The town is a point of departure for visits to Mount Tenakourou, the highest peak in Burkina Faso.
