= Kankalaba =

Town in Cascades, Burkina Faso

- Rural commune
- Location in Burkina Faso
- Coordinates: 10°45′04″N 5°17′20″W
- Country: Burkina Faso
- Region: Cascades Region
- Province: Leraba Province
- Department: Kankalaba Department

Population (2019)
  - Total: 1,972

Kankalaba is a town located in the Kankalaba Department, Leraba Province, Cascades Region in Burkina Faso.
