= Dakoro Department, Burkina Faso =

Coordinates: 10°28′00″N 5°09′00″W

Dakoro
- Department
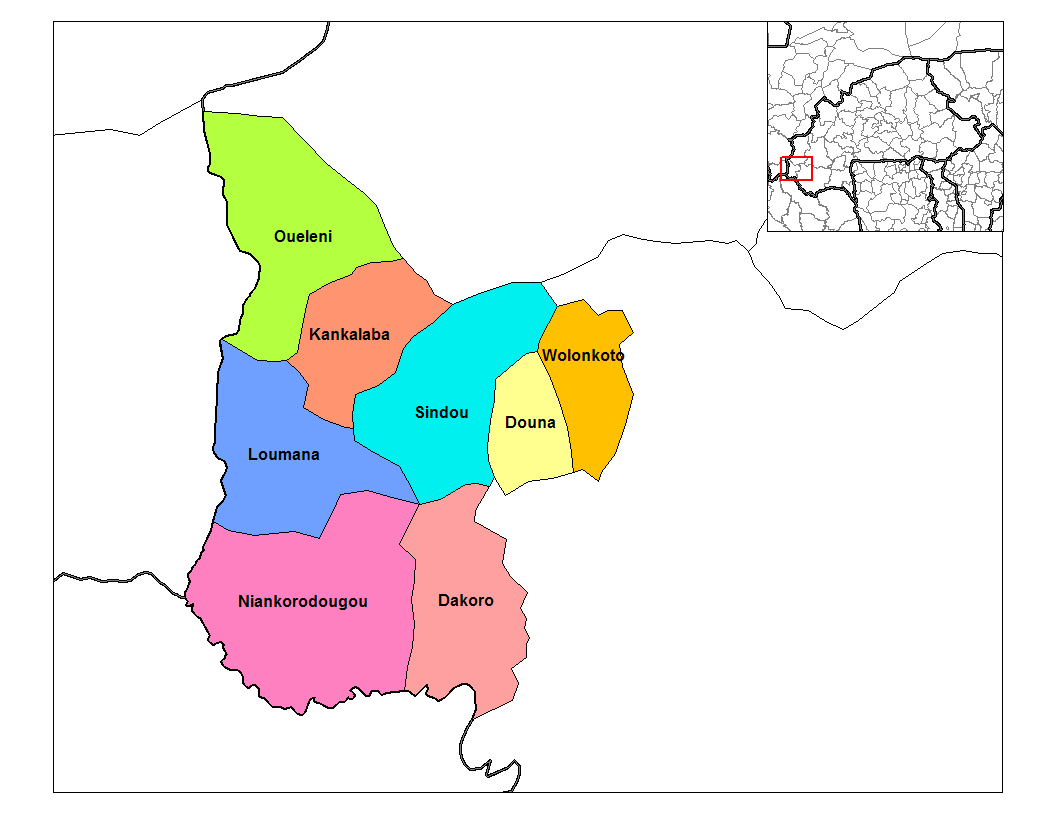
- Dakoro Department, Burkina Faso location in the province
- Country: Burkina Faso
- Province: Léraba Province

Area
  - Total: 160.3 sq mi (415.1 km^{2})

Population (2019 census)
  - Total: 18,003
  - Density: 112.3/sq mi (43.37/km^{2})
- Time zone: UTC+0 (GMT 0)

Dakoro is a department or commune of Léraba Province in south-western Burkina Faso. Its capital lies at the town of Dakoro. According to the 2019 census the department has a total population of 18,003.

== Towns and villages ==
- Dakoro (7 121 inhabitants) (capital)
- Diérisso (829 inhabitants)
- Lemagara (833 inhabitants)
- Moadougou (1 883 inhabitants)
- Kasseguera (2 198 inhabitants)
