= Lineker Mbesuma =

Zambian footballer (born 2007)

Personal information
- Full name: Lineker Kagiya Mbesuma
- Date of birth: 14 July 2007 (age 19)
- Place of birth: Zambia
- Position: Forward

Team information
- Current team: Jomo Cosmos

Youth career
- SuperSport United
- Bidvest Wits
- TS Galaxy
- Warriors
- Jomo Cosmos

International career
Years	Team	Apps	(Gls)
2023	Zambia U17	3	(0)

Lineker Kagiya Mbesuma (born 14 July 2007) is a Zambian professional footballer who plays as a forward for South African side Jomo Cosmos.

== Early life ==
Mbesuma was born in Zambia, but moved to South Africa as a child.

== Club career ==
Mbesuma started his career with the SuperSport Soccer School, joining at the age of six. He later joined Bidvest Wits, but left after the club disbanded in 2020, going on to play for TS Galaxy and Warriors, before joining Jomo Cosmos. In April 2024, he was training with SAFA Second Division club Platinum City Rovers.

== International career ==
In 2022, it was reported that Mbesuma would be called up to the Zambia under-20 team for the 2023 U-20 Africa Cup of Nations. He received his first call-up to the Zambia under-17 team in March 2023, in preparation for the 2023 U-17 Africa Cup of Nations. Following his call up to the competition proper, he iterated the Zambian squad's intention to win the tournament and qualify for the 2023 FIFA U-17 World Cup.

== Personal life ==
Mbesuma is the son of former Zambian international footballer Collins Mbesuma. His brothers, Morientes and Neymar, are also footballers.
