= Harouna Djibirin =

Cameroonian footballer (born 2006)

Personal information
- Date of birth: 5 November 2006 (age 20)
- Place of birth: Yaoundé, Cameroon
- Height: 1.75 m (5 ft 9 in)
- Position: Winger

Team information
- Current team: Angers
- Number: 31

Youth career
- AS Dauphine FC

Senior career*
Years	Team	Apps	(Gls)
2025–	Angers B	3	(0)
2025–	Angers	15	(2)

International career^{‡}
2023	Cameroon U17	2	(0)
2026–	Cameroon	1	(0)
- * Club domestic league appearances and goals as of 20 May 2026 ‡ National team caps and goals as of 12 November 2026

Harouna Djibirin (born 5 November 2006) is a Cameroonian professional footballer who plays as a winger for Ligue 1 club Angers and the Cameroon national team.

== Career ==
A youth product of Cameroonian club AS Dauphine FC, Djibirin signed a four-year contract with French club Angers on 30 January 2025. After a long administrative delay, Djibirin started training with the senior Angers team on 4 September 2025. He made his senior and professional debut with Angers in a 1–1 Ligue 1 tie with Monaco on 18 October 2025.

== International career ==
Djibirin was called up to the Cameroon U17s for the 2023 U-17 Africa Cup of Nations.
