= Douna =

- Location within Burkina Faso, West Africa
- Coordinates: 10.622817°N 5.130615°W
- Country: Burkina Faso
- Time zone: UTC+0 (GMT)

Douna is a rural municipality in southwestern Burkina Faso. It is near the city of Bobo-Dioulasso.
