= Mount Tenakourou =

Highest point in Burkina Faso

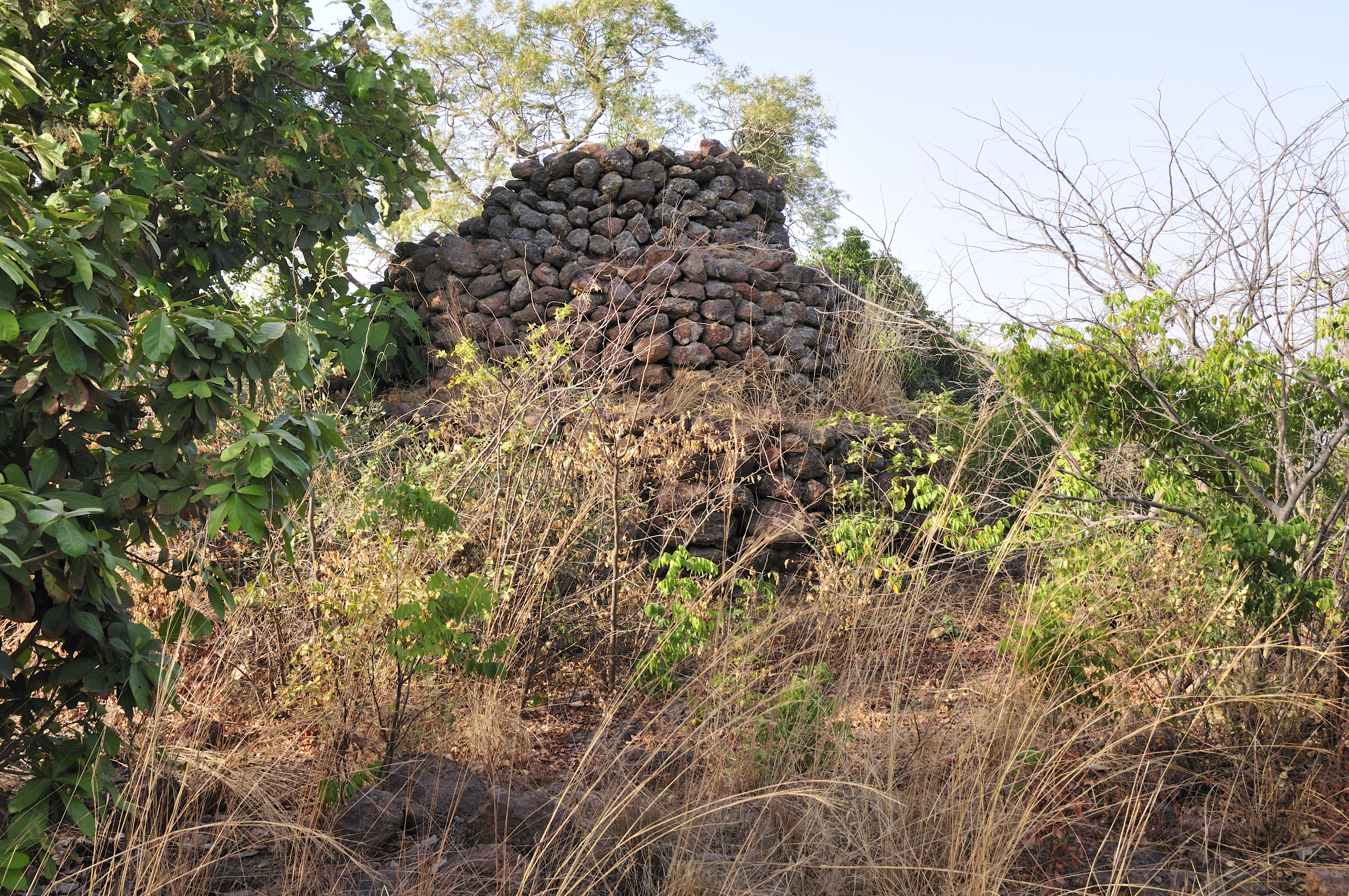
- Stones at the top of the Tenakourou

Highest point
- Elevation: 747 m (2,451 ft)
- Listing: Country high point
- Coordinates: 10°45′00″N 5°25′00″W

Geography
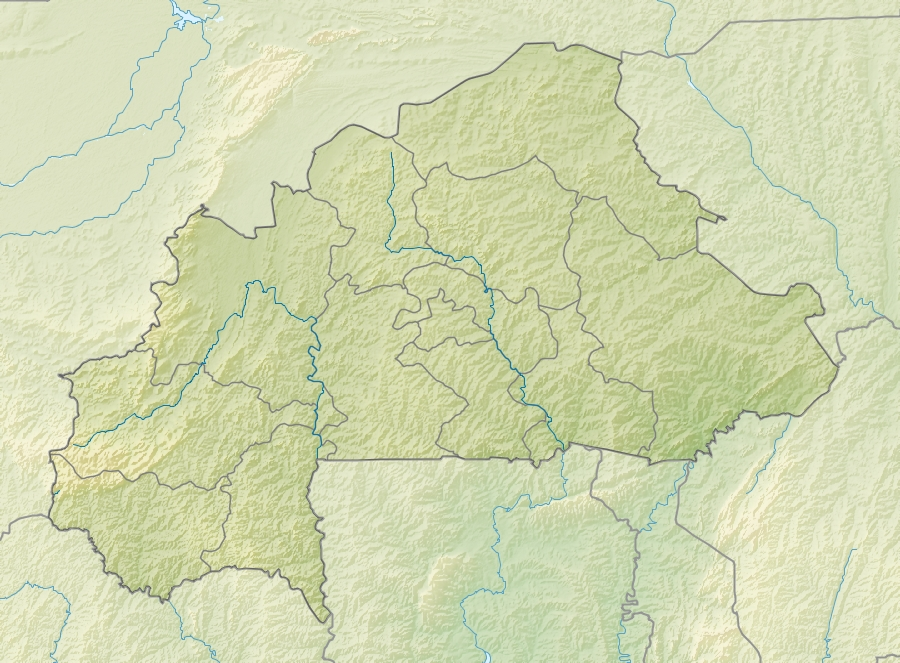
- Location within Burkina Faso
- Location: Burkina Faso – Mali border

Geology
- Mountain type: Hill

Mount Tenakourou (also spelled Ténakourou, Tena Kourou or Téna Kourou) is the highest point in Burkina Faso. It is a hill situated on the border of the Cascades Region of Burkina Faso and the Sikasso Region of the country of Mali, not far from the source of the Black Volta. It has an elevation of 747 metres (2,451 ft). The hill is part of Burkina Faso's South-Western Paleozoic sandstone massif and was formed through the incline of the country's Central Plateau. The surrounding terrain is relatively flat and around 400 metres (1,312 ft) high.

The Tenakourou is located 46 kilometres (29 miles) to the North-West of Sindou and can be reached through Kankalaba. Other nearby towns are Orodara in Burkina Faso and Loulouni in Mali. One of the attractions is that the summit offers a view over three countries: Burkina Faso, Mali at a distance of 3 kilometres (2 miles) and Ivory Coast at 13 kilometres (8 miles). In 1974, the French erected a pile of stones on the summit to raise its elevation to 750 metres. Between 2003 and 2005, the National Tourism Office of Burkina Faso organised a series of high-profile climbs of the hill to raise its touristic potential.

The name Tenakourou signifies "the hill of Tena" in Dyula language. Tena is the name of the village of around 600 inhabitants that lies at the foot of the peak, surrounded by scrubland. Its name means "have a seat here". The village has a mosque and a school, and sometimes hosts an Arts Festival.

Although the area is considered a hotspot of plant diversity, it is still relatively neglected in terms of scientific research. Some of the species found are:

- Andropogon sp.
- Cajanus kerstingii
- Capparis sp.
- Clematis hirsuta
- Crotalaria sp.
- Crotalaria ononoides
- Cymbopogon giganteus
- Leptospron adenanthum
- Ludwigia hyssopifolia
- Panicum phragmitoides
- Polygala sp.
- Schizachyrium sp.
- Schizachyrium exile
- Scleria bulbifera
- Sida sp.
- Solanum sp.
- Trema orientalis
- Vitex chrysocarpa

Species of the fungus genus Scleroderma have also been identified.

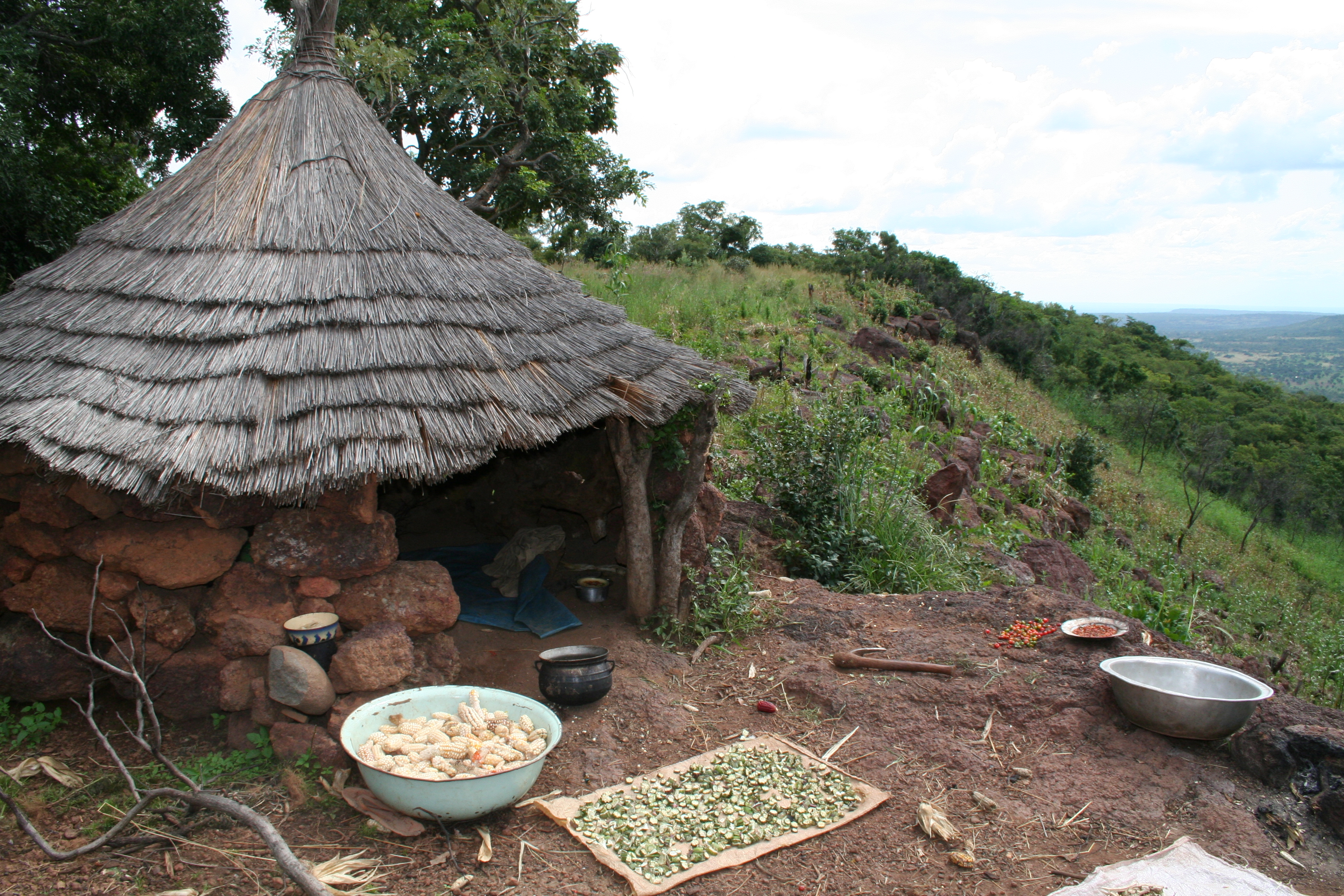
A hut near the summit of Tenakourou

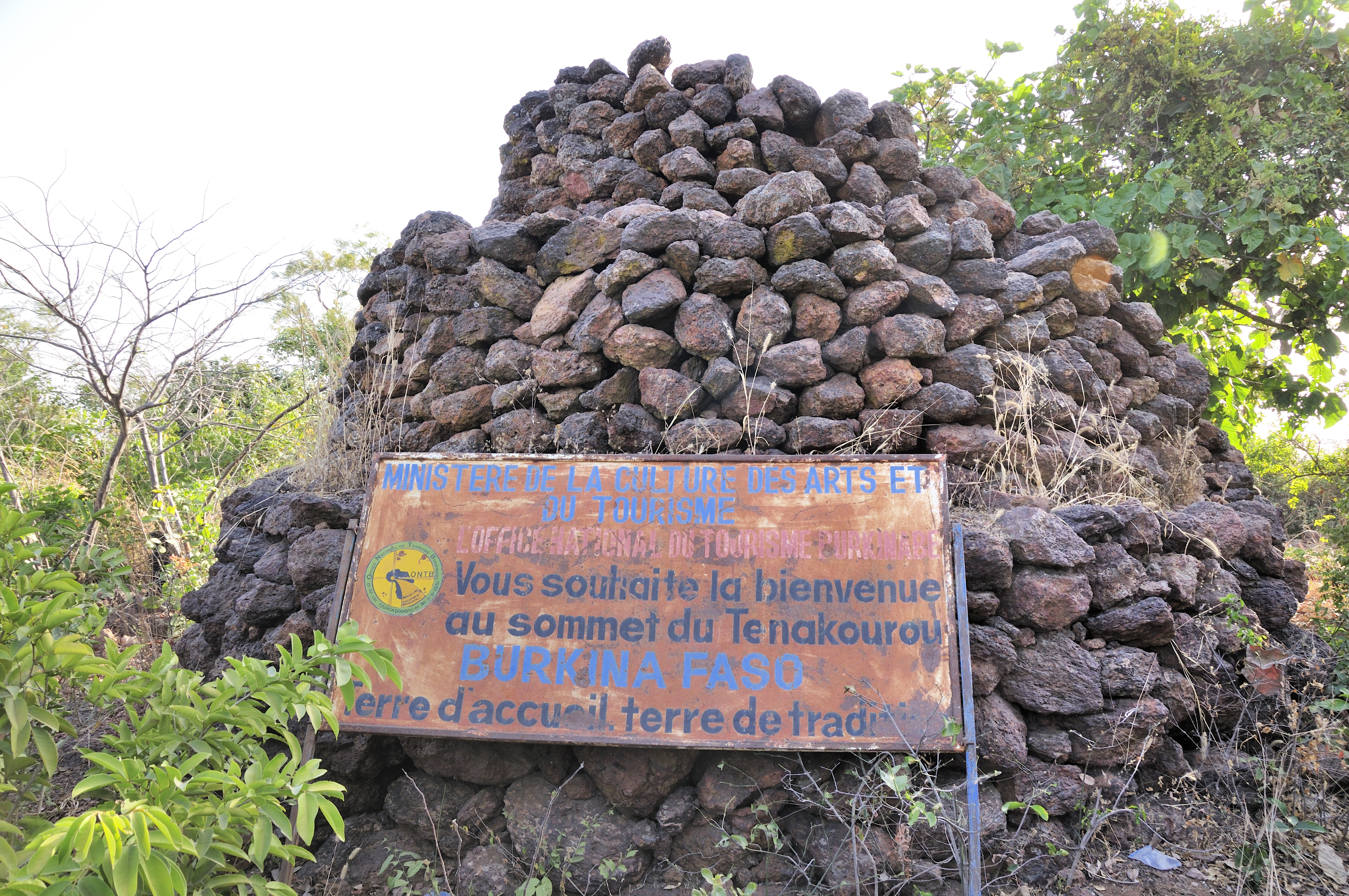
Stones at the top of the Tenakourou

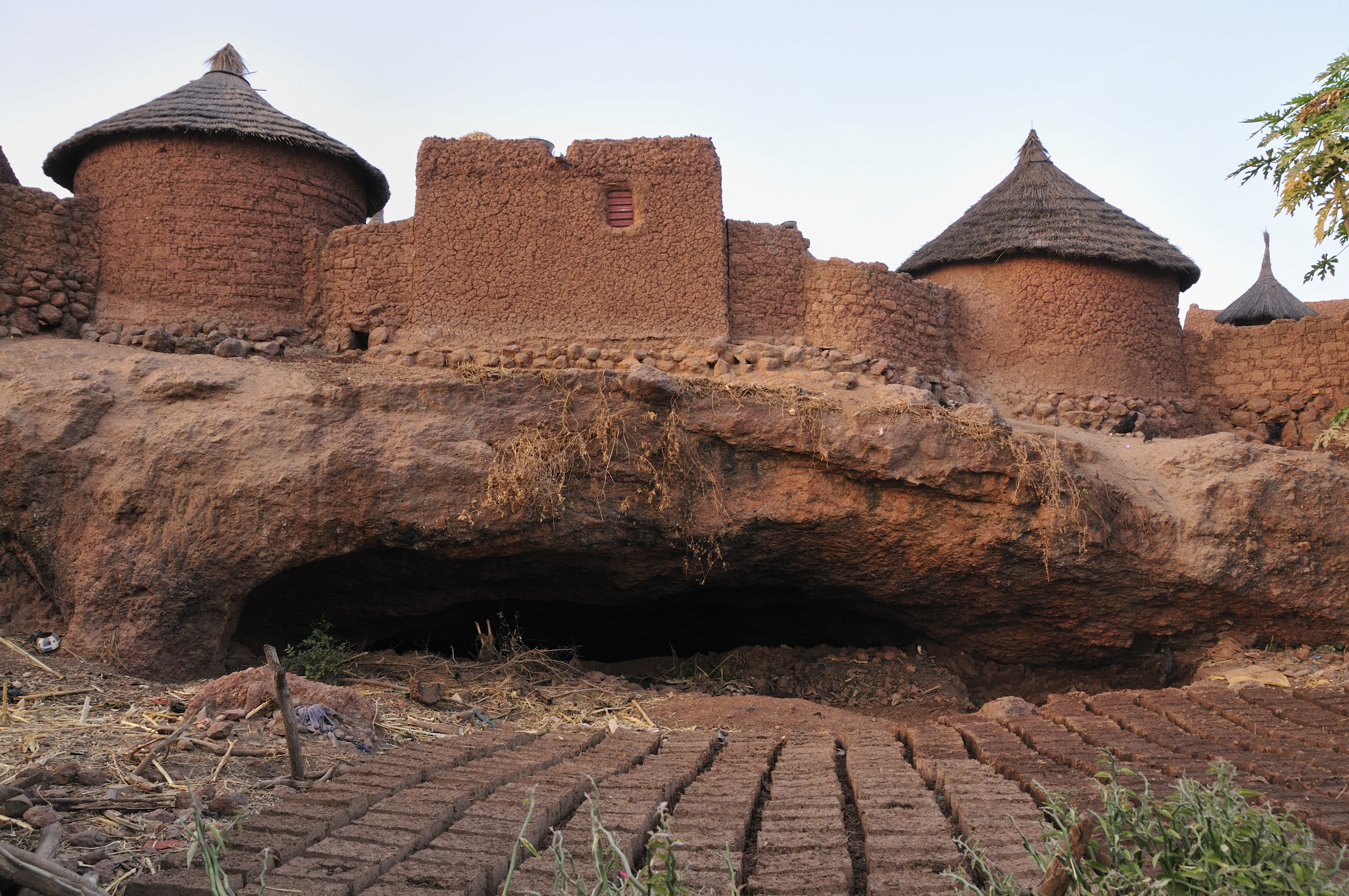
Village on the side of Mount Tenakourou

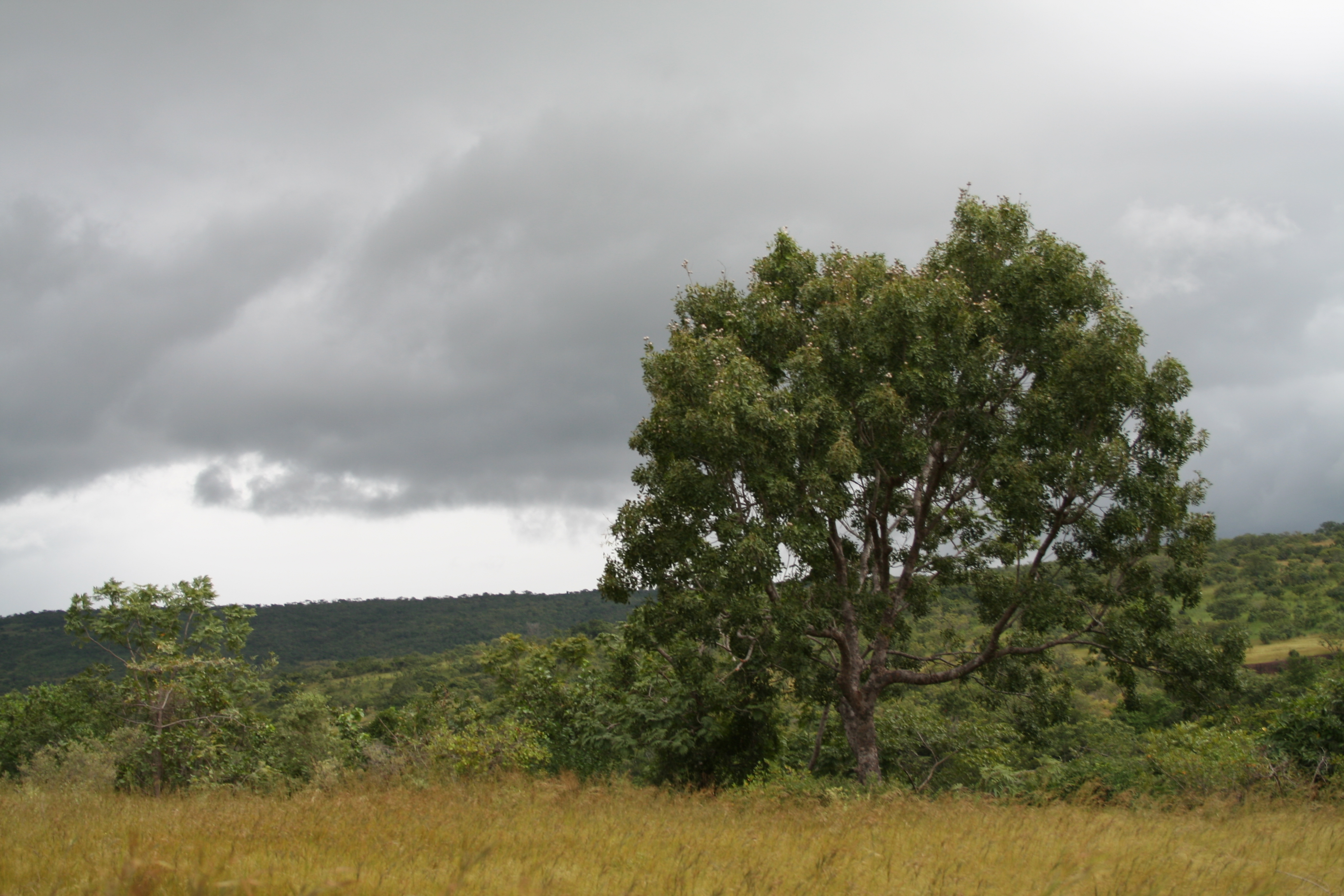
Khaya senegalensis near Mount Tenakourou
