= Hadrian's Villa =

Archaeological complex in Tivoli, Italy

Villa Adriana (Tivoli)
UNESCO World Heritage Site
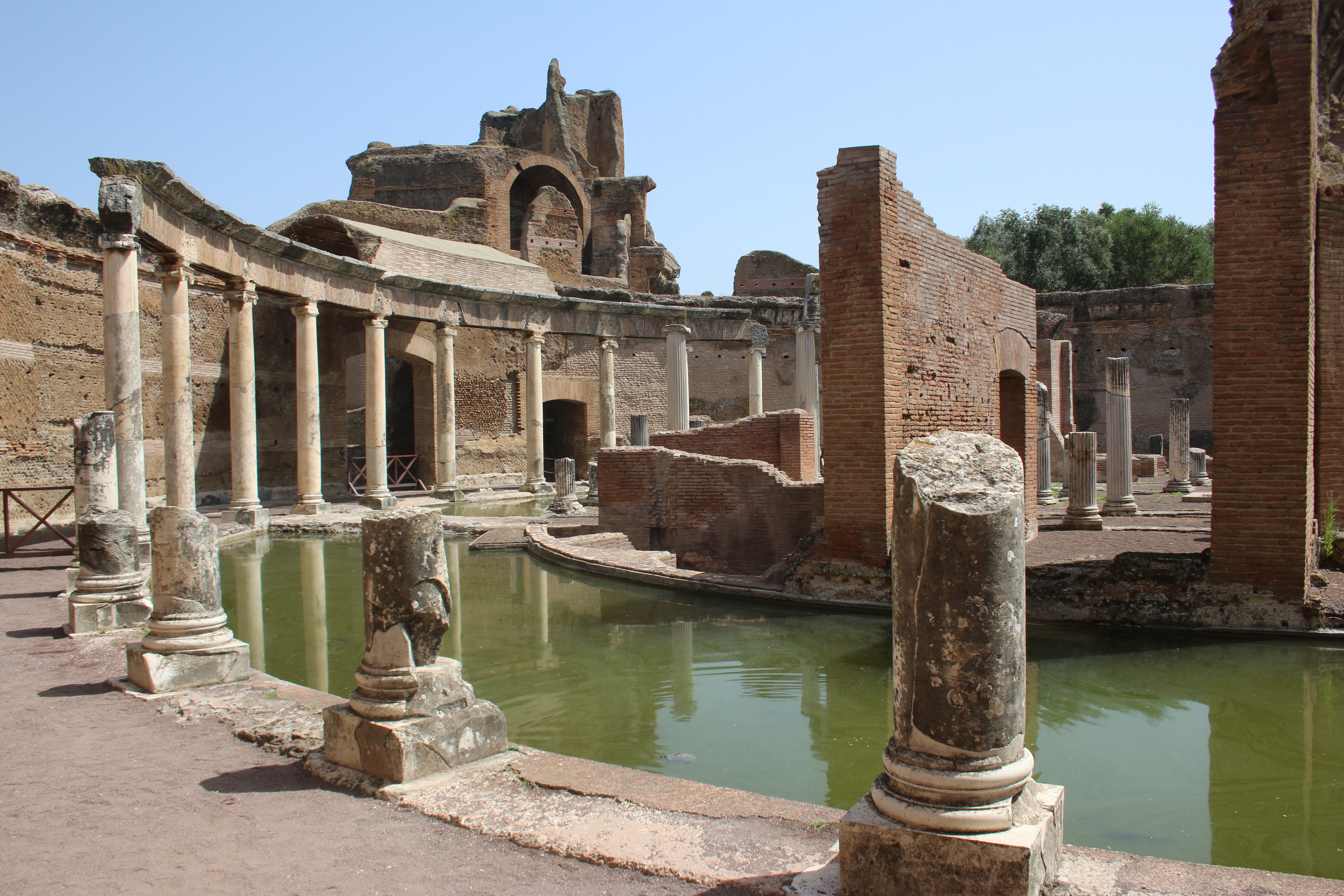

- Location within Lazio Location within Italy
- Interactive map of Villa Adriana (Tivoli)
- Location: Tivoli, Lazio, Italy
- Criteria: Cultural: (i), (ii), (iii)
- Reference: 907
- Inscription: 1999 (23rd Session)
- Area: 80 ha (200 acres)
- Buffer zone: 500 ha (1,200 acres)
- Website: villae.cultura.gov.it
- Coordinates: 41°56′46″N 12°46′21″E

Hadrian's Villa (Italian: Villa Adriana; Latin: Villa Hadriana) was a monumental villa or palace complex built around AD 120 by emperor Hadrian (r.117–138) near Tivoli, about 20 km from Rome. Its remains are now included in a UNESCO World Heritage Site.

It is one of the most imposing and complex Roman villas known. The complex contains over 30 monumental and scenic buildings arranged on a series of artificial esplanades at different heights and surrounded by gardens decorated with water basins and nymphaea (fountains). The whole complex covers an area of at least a square kilometre, an area larger than the city of Pompeii. In addition to the villa's impressive layout, many of the buildings are considered masterpieces of Roman architecture, making use of striking curved shapes enabled by extensive use of concrete. They were ingenious for the complex symmetry of their ground plans and are considered unrivalled until the arrival of Baroque architecture in the 17th century, initiated by Borromini, who used Hadrian's Villa for inspiration.

The site, much of which is still unexcavated, is largely owned by the Republic of Italy and has been managed since 2014 by the Polo Museale del Lazio, although significant peripheral areas of the villa are in private property.

== History ==
Several Republican-era villas, one or more of which were possibly inherited by his wife Vibia Sabina, occupied artificial terraces on the site. Hadrian began construction on the villa early in his reign at the end of 118 or the beginning of 119, a few months after his arrival in Rome, as the majority of the first brick stamps are dated to 117 and would have been made in advance.

However, Hadrian spent many years of his reign visiting the empire and his first presence at the Villa is documented in 125 after the return from his first trip. He started using the villa as his official residence around 128 although already in the summer of 125 an official letter was sent by Hadrian from the villa. The Villa was greatly expanded after Hadrian's first trip as most brick stamps date to 123 and building continued while he was away during his absence on the second and third trips so that he could enjoy completed buildings on his return in about 130. This left him at most only six years of residence here. Nevertheless a large court lived here permanently and large numbers of visitors would have to have been entertained and housed temporarily on site.

His presence here is also documented in 135 after the return from his last trip. He is believed to have retired here towards the end of his life. Building also continued from the late 130's as shown by brick stamps, and some may not have been finished at his death, as brick stamps from the South Theatre date from 137.

After Hadrian, the villa was used occasionally by his successors and was still important as shown by the addition of busts of Antoninus Pius (138–161), Marcus Aurelius (161–180), Lucius Verus (161–169), Septimius Severus and Caracalla found on the premises. The villa was restored by Diocletian during the final decades of the third century. In the 4th century at the latest, after the founding of Constantinople in 330 by Emperor Constantine I, decay and exploitation began: statues, high-quality marble and other furnishings were gradually removed. The complex served as a military camp for both sides during the Gothic War (535–554) between the Ostrogoths and Byzantines. Further dismantling and removal of materials and furnishings that could be used for other purposes took place in the course of the expansion of the Diocese of Tivoli.

The first documented rediscovery of the villa was by Historian Flavio Biondo in the late 15th century who brought its attention to Pope Pius II whose writings on the villa in his Commentaries began to pique architectural interest in the villa. In the 16th century, Cardinal Ippolito II d'Este had much of the remaining marble and statues in Hadrian's Villa removed to decorate his own Villa d'Este located nearby.

== Structure and architecture ==
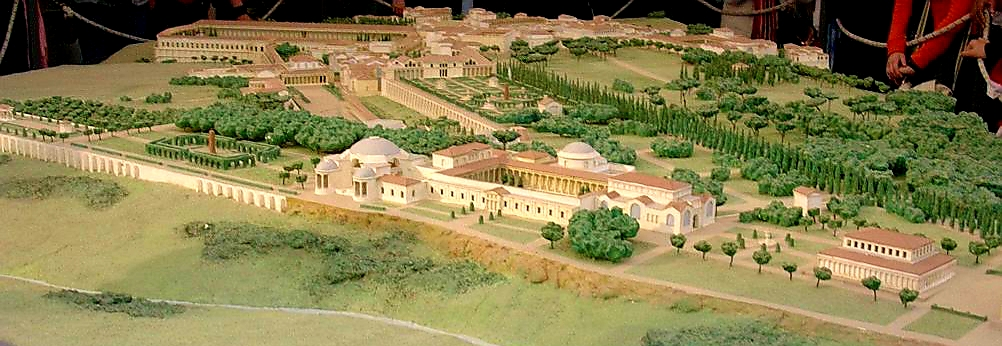
A model of Hadrian's Villa

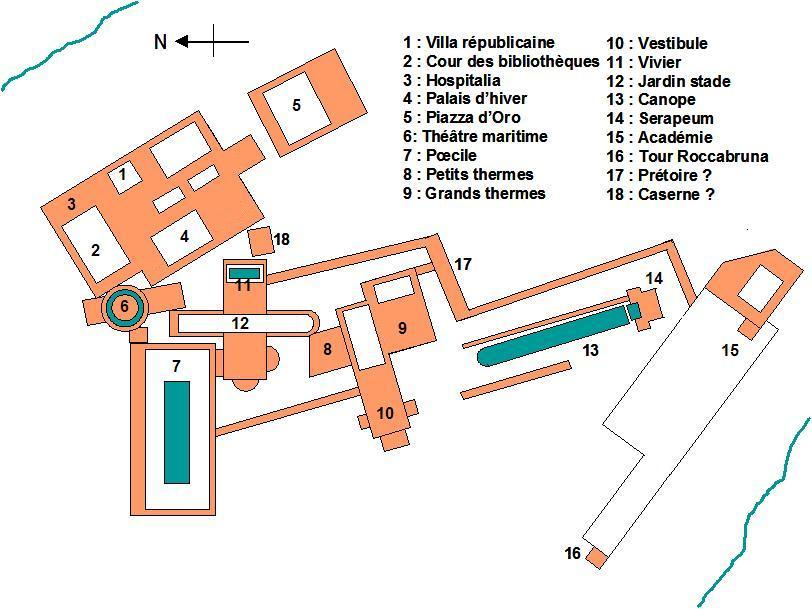
A plan of Hadrian's Villa

The buildings are constructed in travertine, brick, lime, pozzolana, and tufa. Villas were typically sited on hilltops, but with its fountains, pools and gardens, Hadrian's villa required abundant sources of water, which was supplied by aqueducts feeding Rome, including the Aqua Anio Vetus, Aqua Anio Novus, Aqua Marcia, and Aqua Claudia. To avail themselves of those sources, the villa had to be located on land lower than the aqueduct.

The complex of the villa contains many structures from different cultures. For example, the villa has a small river running through it which relates back to the Egyptian Nile river. The villa contains several Greek figures called Poikilos. All surviving written evidence of Hadrian's Villa in ancient writing is from the Historia Augusta, which describes how Hadrian named rooms of the villa after various significant locations within the Roman Empire (the Lyceum, the Academy, Hades) and these continue today to be the terms scholars use to describe sections of the villa.

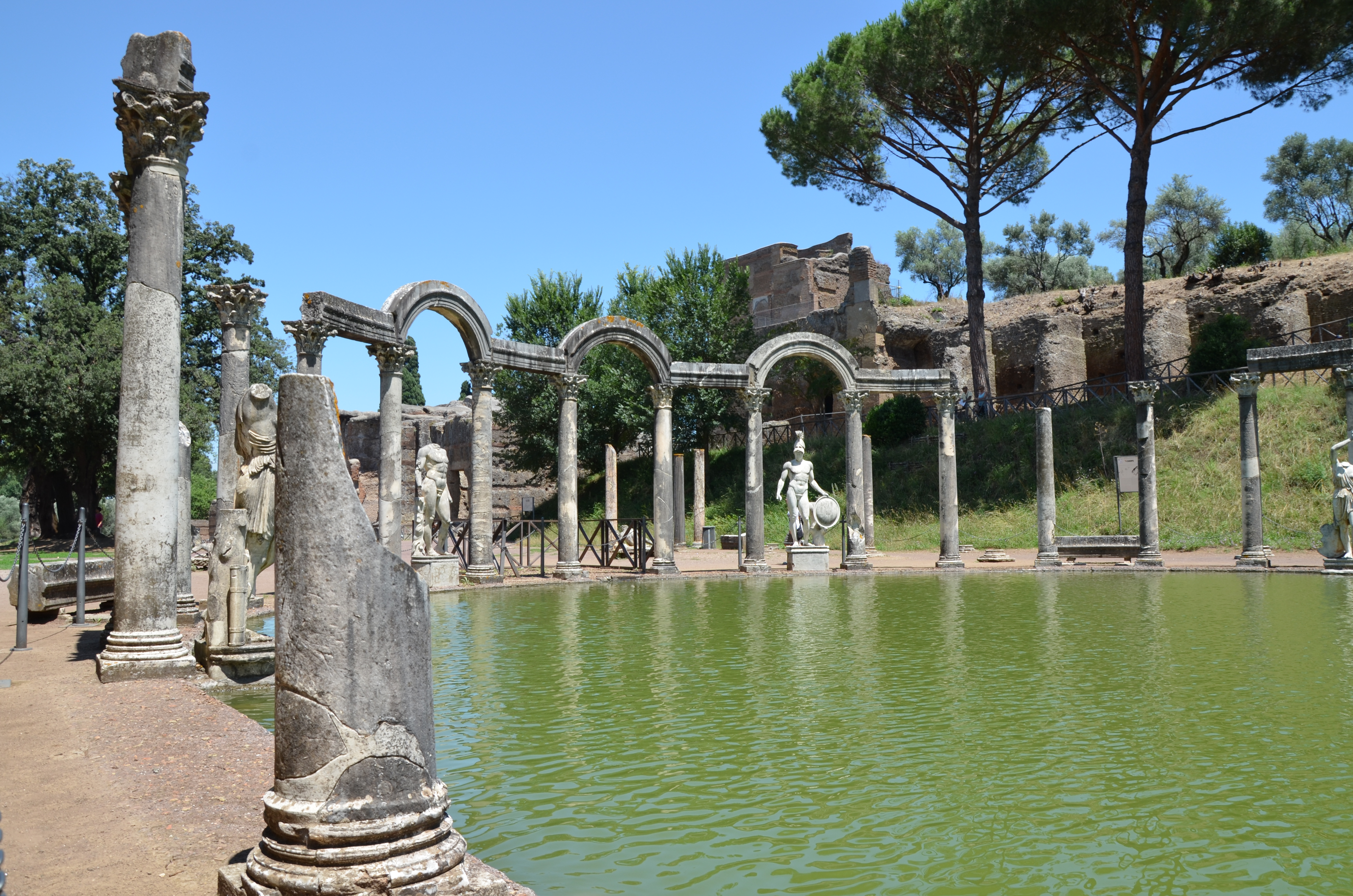
The villa's recreation area known as Canopus, as seen from the temple of Serapis

The architecture goes beyond the mere naming of its structures after places and monuments seen by Hadrian on his extensive travels across the empire. Certain buildings clearly attempt to recreate specific features of landscapes or architecture that had personal significance for the emperor.

Thus, the area known as the Canopus, named after the Egyptian city and a section of the Nile which leads to the city, features a long, stately reflecting pool representing the Nile. It is a large open-air dining area with a covered triclinium with a huge stibadium (a semicircular masonry couch) located in an enormous domed exedra overlooking the lake. This area's sculptural program is the most complete including copies of famous sculptures including the caryatids of the Erechtheion, a statue depicting the Egyptian dwarf and fertility god Bes, and a crocodile.

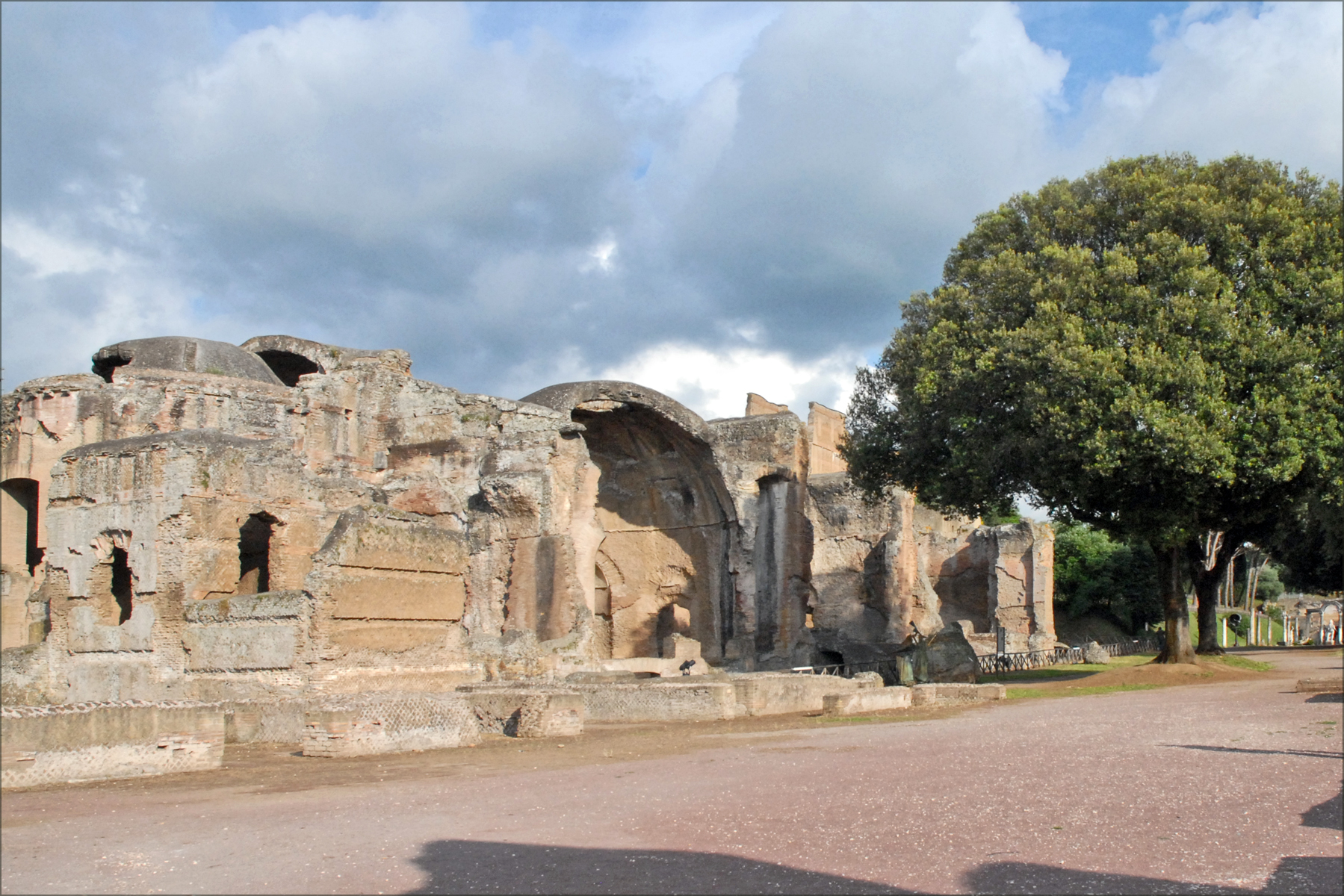
Grand Thermae

One structure in the villa is the so-called "Maritime Theatre". It consists of a round portico with a barrel vault supported by pillars. Inside the portico was a ring-shaped pool with a central island. The large circular enclosure 40 metres (130 ft) in diameter has an entrance to the north. Inside the outer wall and surrounding the moat are a ring of unfluted Ionic columns. The Maritime Theater includes a lounge, a library, heated baths, three suites with heated floors, washbasin, an art gallery, and a large fountain.

=== Earlier villas ===
Three earlier villas have been identified on the site One was incorporated into the Imperial palace, another was 250 m away and consisted of the terrace of the Doric Temple, including the fountain room. A third over 200 m away from the palace was on the other side of the Republican road later included in the Villa's transport network. Recent excavations have explored these earlier levels.

The remains of the villa incorporated into the Imperial Palace show, from the building techniques used, that it was built over three periods: the first dating to Sulla's era (beginning of the 1st century BC); the second to the time of Caesar and Pompey (mid-first century BC); the third to that of Augustus (end of first century BC). The villa had a more conventional layout on two levels: the northwest entrance led to a large garden on the lower level with a small temple-shaped nymphaeum at the north end, later converted into the Courtyard of the Libraries. From there twin staircases ascended to the atrium on the upper level platform with the residential part, supported by the Cryptoporticus with Mosaic Vault (which was the basis villae of the early villa). Cut into the tufa, the barrel-vaulted galleries of the cryptoporticus form a rectangle underneath the atrium illuminated by windows. The vault of the south-east gallery is decorated with probably the oldest surviving example of a vault mosaic (from the mid-1st century BC).

The atrium led to a tablinum (reception room) at its southern side and then to another peristyle, which still has the original floor mosaic with a white background and pieces of coloured marbles. On the south side of the peristyle was a square exedra leading to a large nymphaeum in the shape of a theatre.

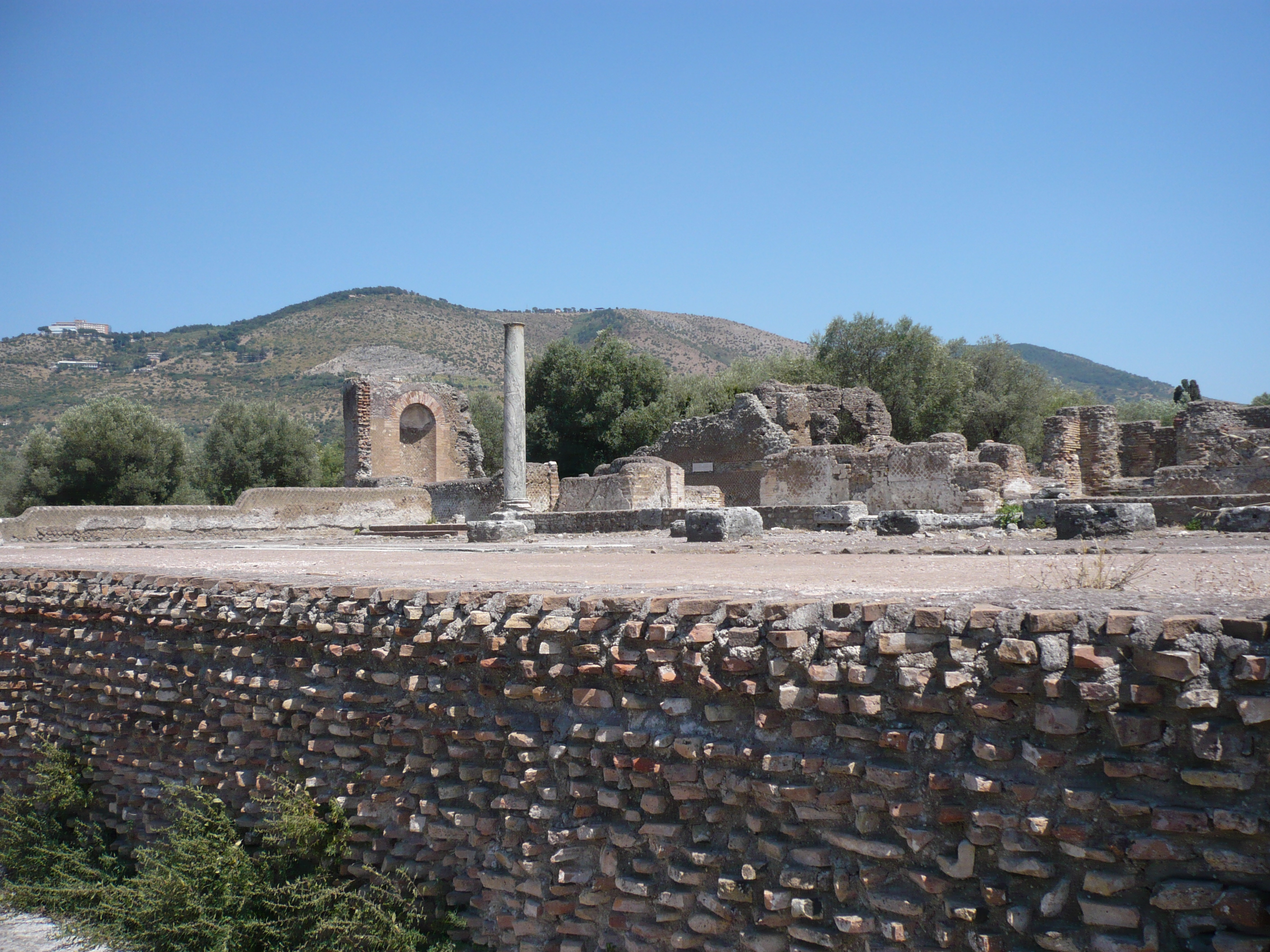
Podium of atrium

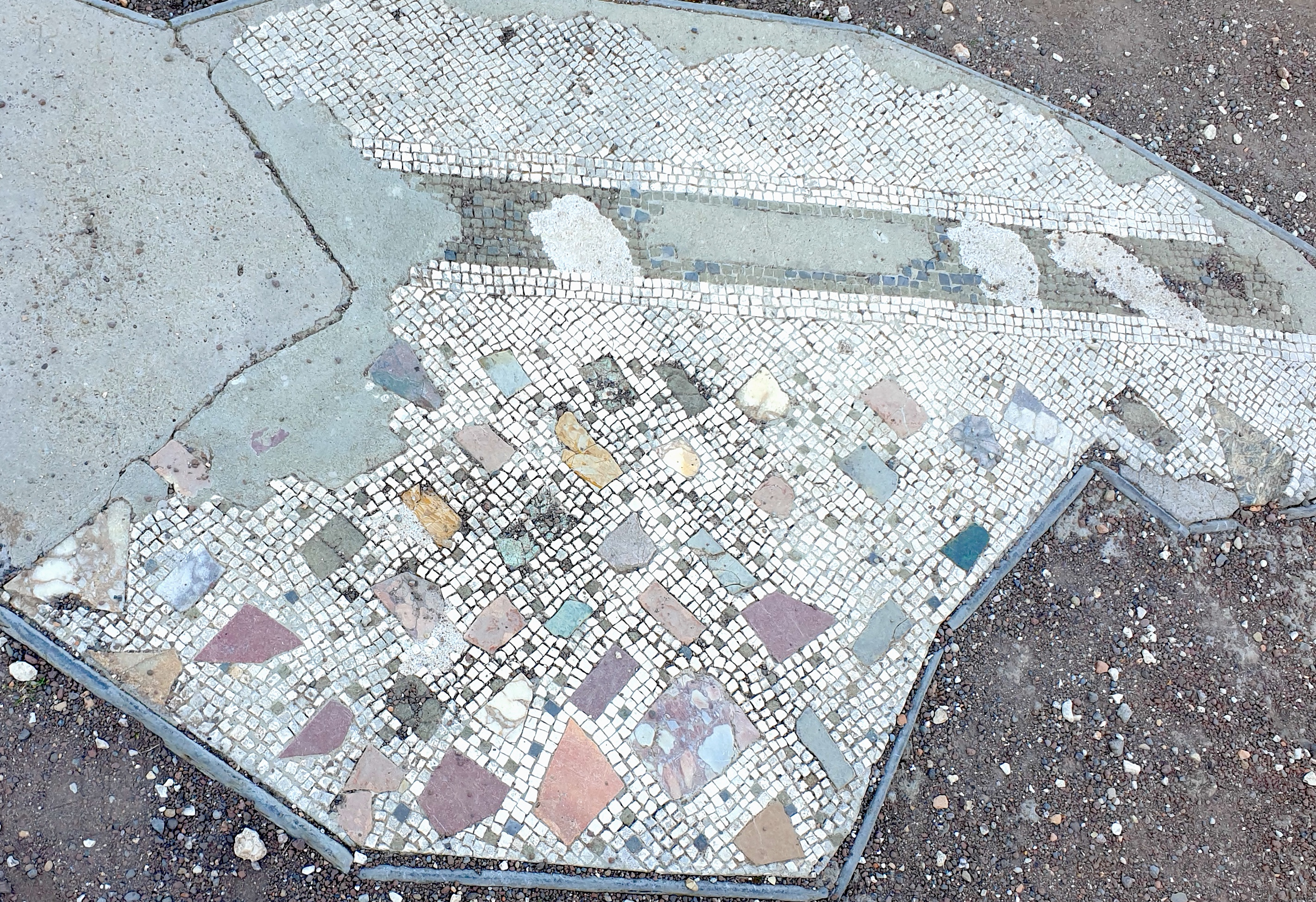
Mosaic Floor of peristyle

=== Imperial Palace ===
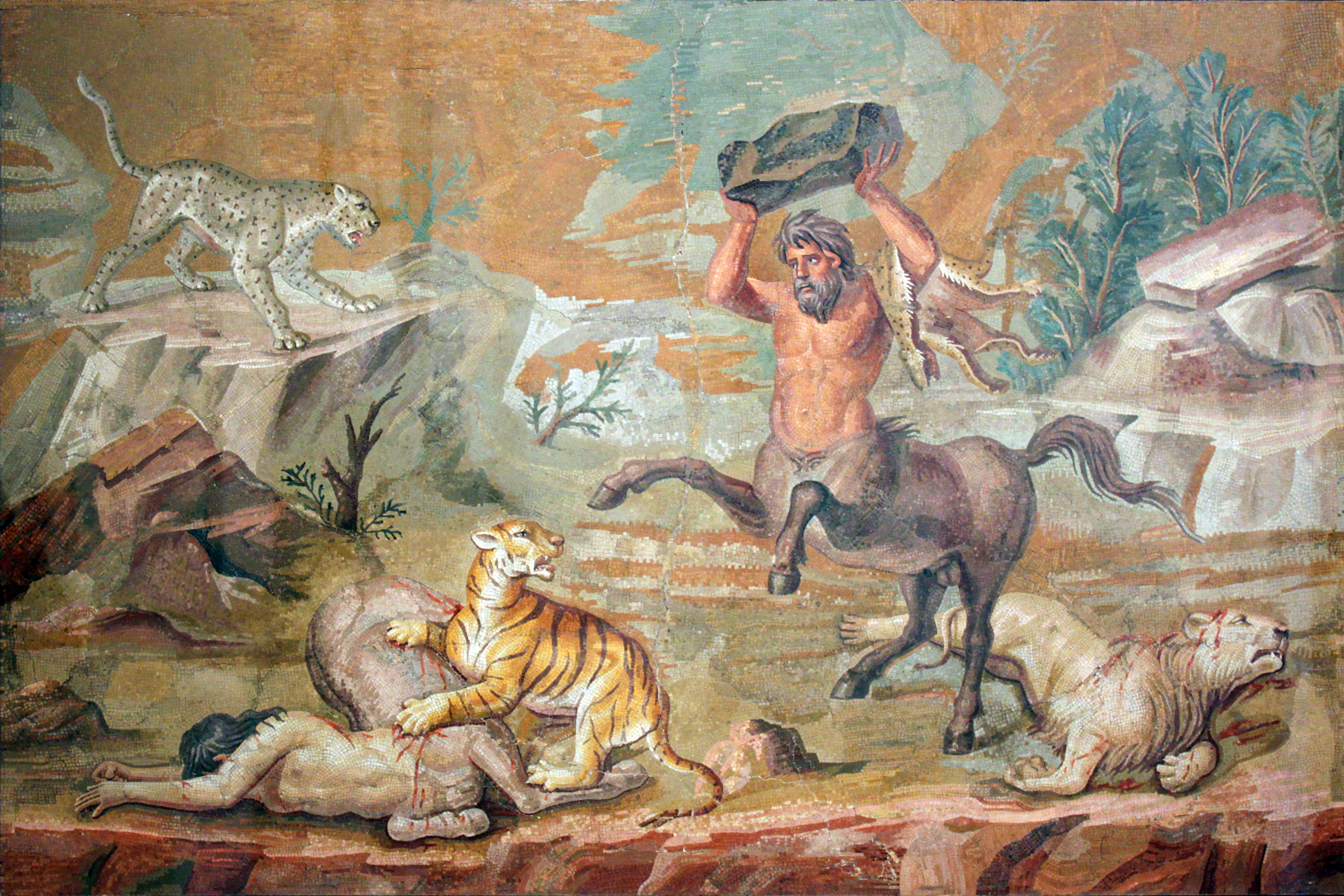
Centaur mosaic from triclinium (Pergamon Museum, Berlin)

The Imperial Palace, the private residential part of the villa, was among the first buildings Hadrian constructed based on the Republican villa. The original cryptoporticus was extended and became a cool place for walking indoors, enlivened by a small nymphaeum cut into the tufa wall to imitate a small natural grotto.

The Republican atrium was transformed into the entrance hall and portico of the palace, paved in marble opus sectile. On the south of the portico the original tablinum was converted into a small library and next to it the so-called Triclinium of the Centaurs was added with two other rooms (today named the Sala a Tre Navate [rooms with 3 aisles]) in which very fine polychrome mosaics (opus vermiculatum) were discovered. The southern side of the Republican peristyle still has large parts of the massive exedra. Beyond the exedra is a courtyard paved with opus spicatum (herringbone tiles) and surrounded by marble opus sectile floors. Facing it on the south is the nymphaeum which was enlarged by Hadrian.

The western side of the palace has other large rooms, some from the Republican era. The so-called Summer Triclinium with a hemispherical dome was built by Hadrian into a nymphaeum in which jets of water flowed into a channel below the stibadium and with seven niches for statues. Discovered in 2021, this appears to be a smaller model for the well-known Serapeum.

The Outer Peristyle was large decorative garden on the eastern side of the palace. Its western wall had alternating semicircular and rectangular niches and at the ends are two nymphaea still with traces of blue frescoes. In the north corner there is a circular latrine with several seats. It overlooked the "Terrace of the Piazza d'Oro" (or Terrace of Tempe) to the east, a long extensive garden probably with plants and pergolas and supported by massive walls. This was overlooked at its south end by the Tempe Pavilion.

The so-called Hall with Doric Pillars lies to the west of the palace exedra and nymphaeum and was built on the Republican villa. It is erroneously named a "hall", while it is in fact a peristyle, an open area surrounded by a vaulted portico with square fluted Doric pillars and with precious marble opus sectile flooring. It was a reception area as shown by its rich decoration though its exact function is unknown. On the west side of the portico is a vast hall paved in opus sectile and with walls faced with precious marbles. Beyond is another peristyle on three sides, paved in white mosaic with fragments of coloured marble similar to the Republican floor in the nearby palace, while on the fourth side is a shallow apse, with a parallelepiped base at the centre. The apse serves mainly to hide the Barracks of the Vigiles at the back, which is incompatible with the decorative buildings in front.

The personal baths of Emperor Hadrian, begun around 118 AD included the innovative Heliocaminus room, which was heated by both sunlight and a hypocaust system. The hall had a coffered dome with a central opening and large windows facing the south-west.

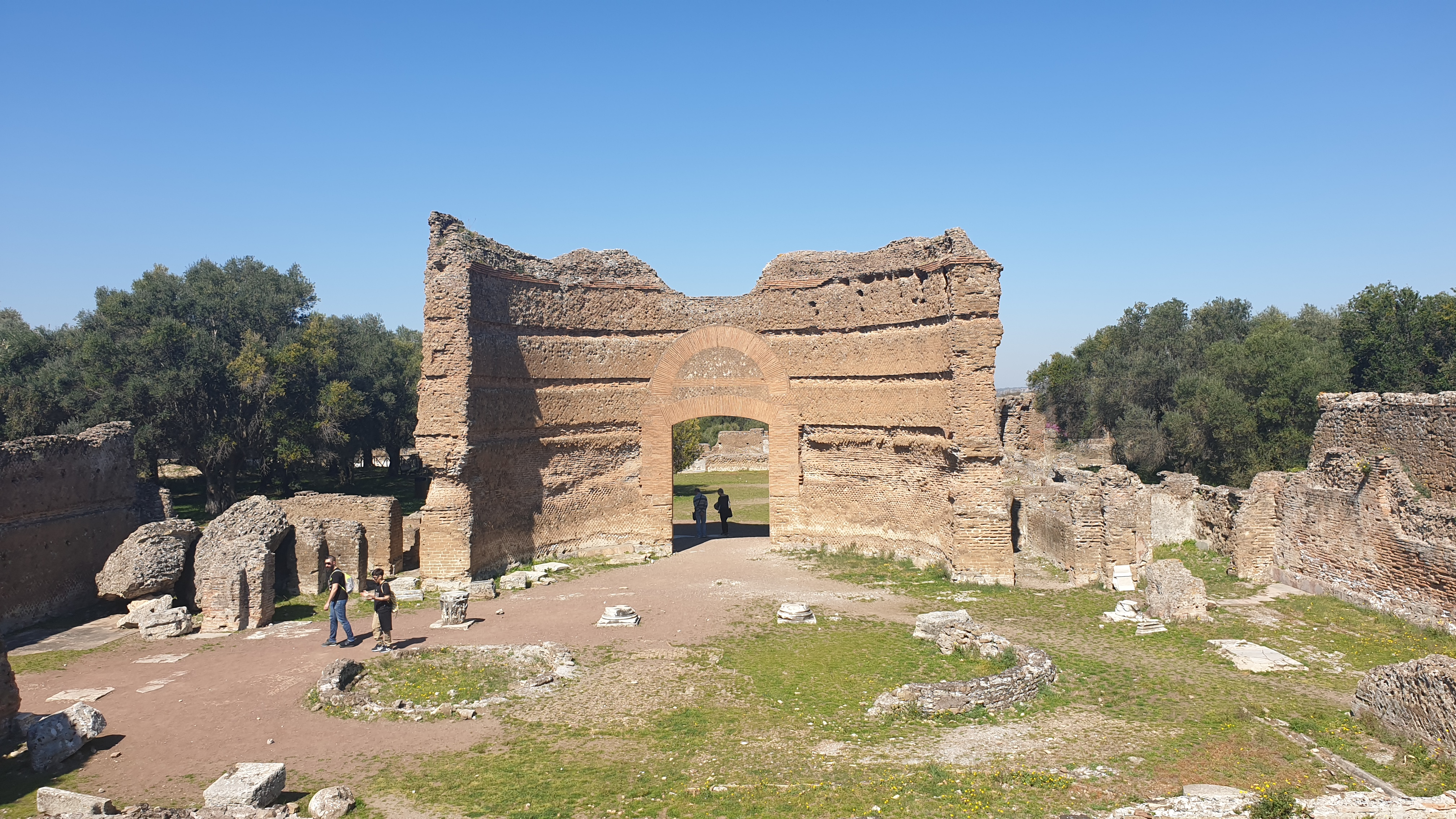
Southern exedra

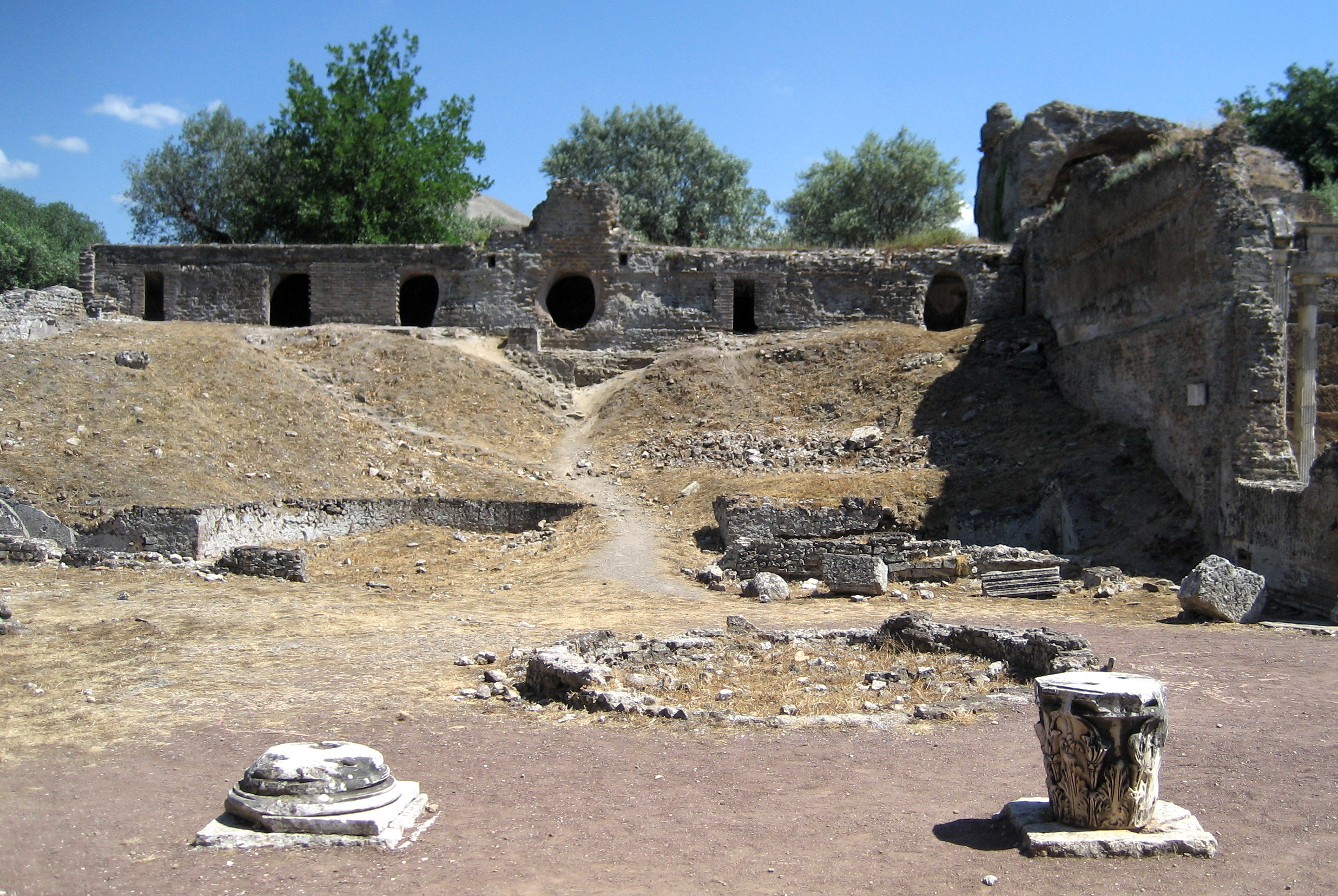
Nymphaeum and courtyard of Imperial Palace

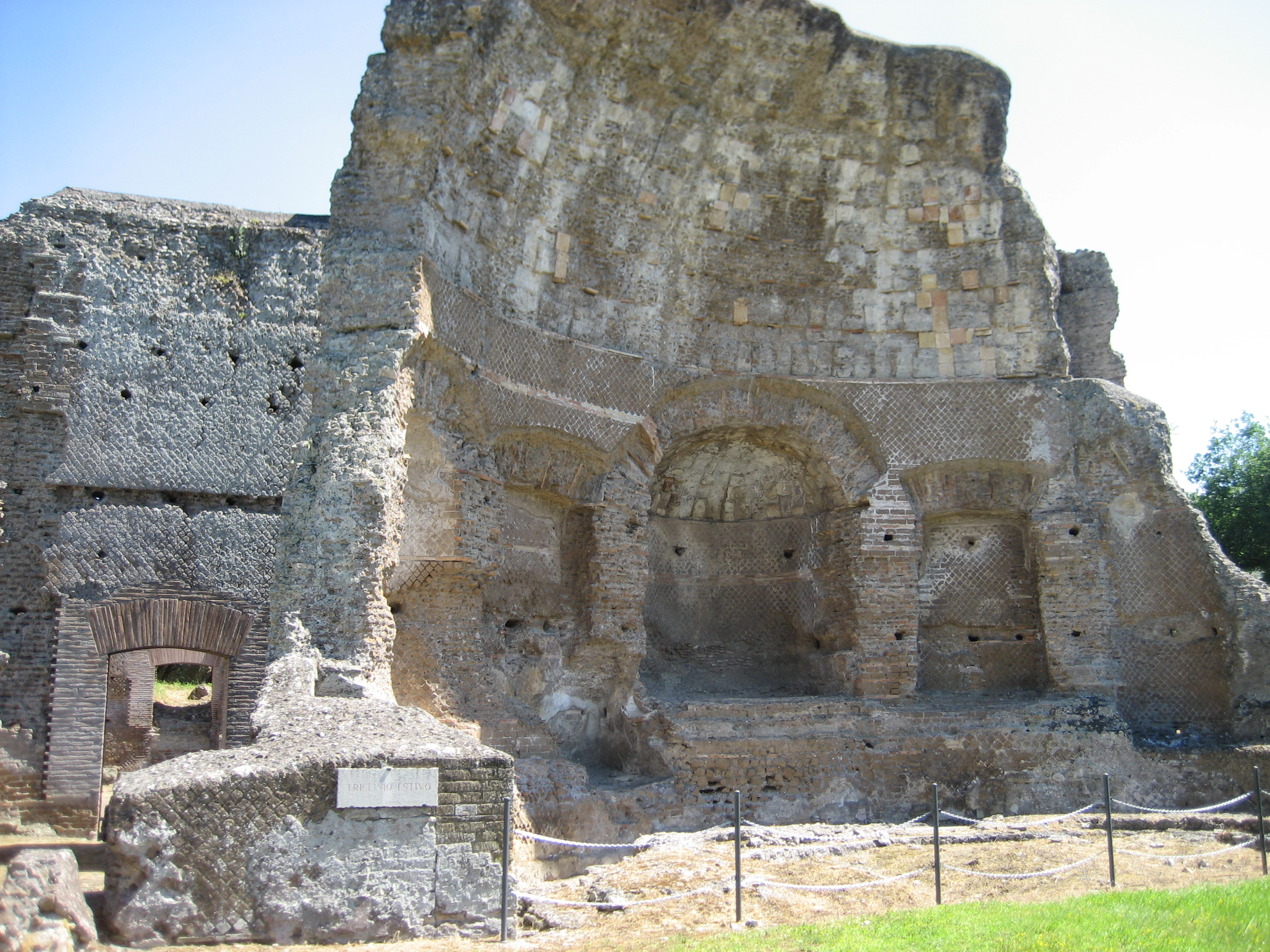
Summer Triclinium

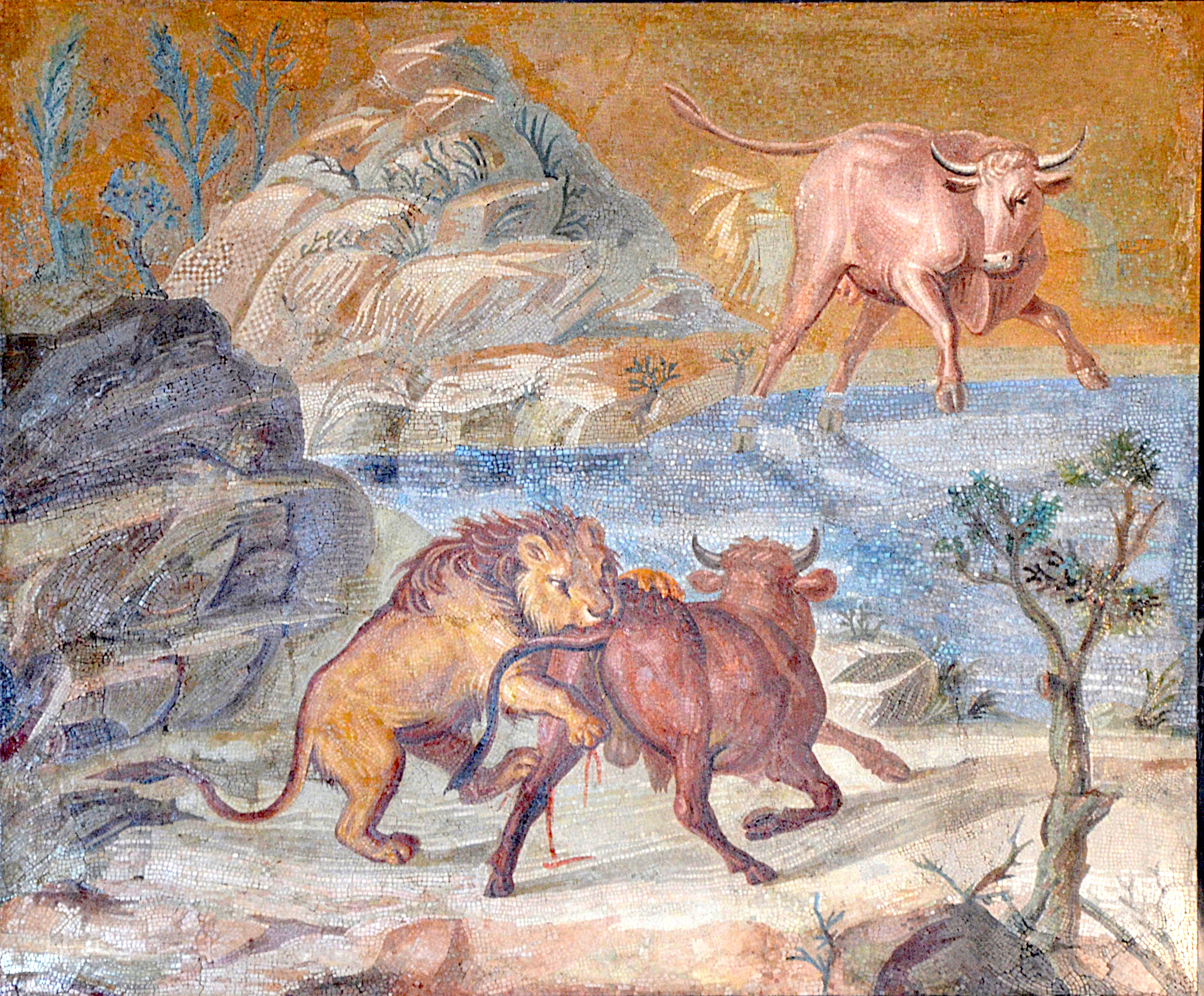
Mosaic from palace (Sala degli Animali, Vatican Museums)

=== The "libraries" and courtyard ===
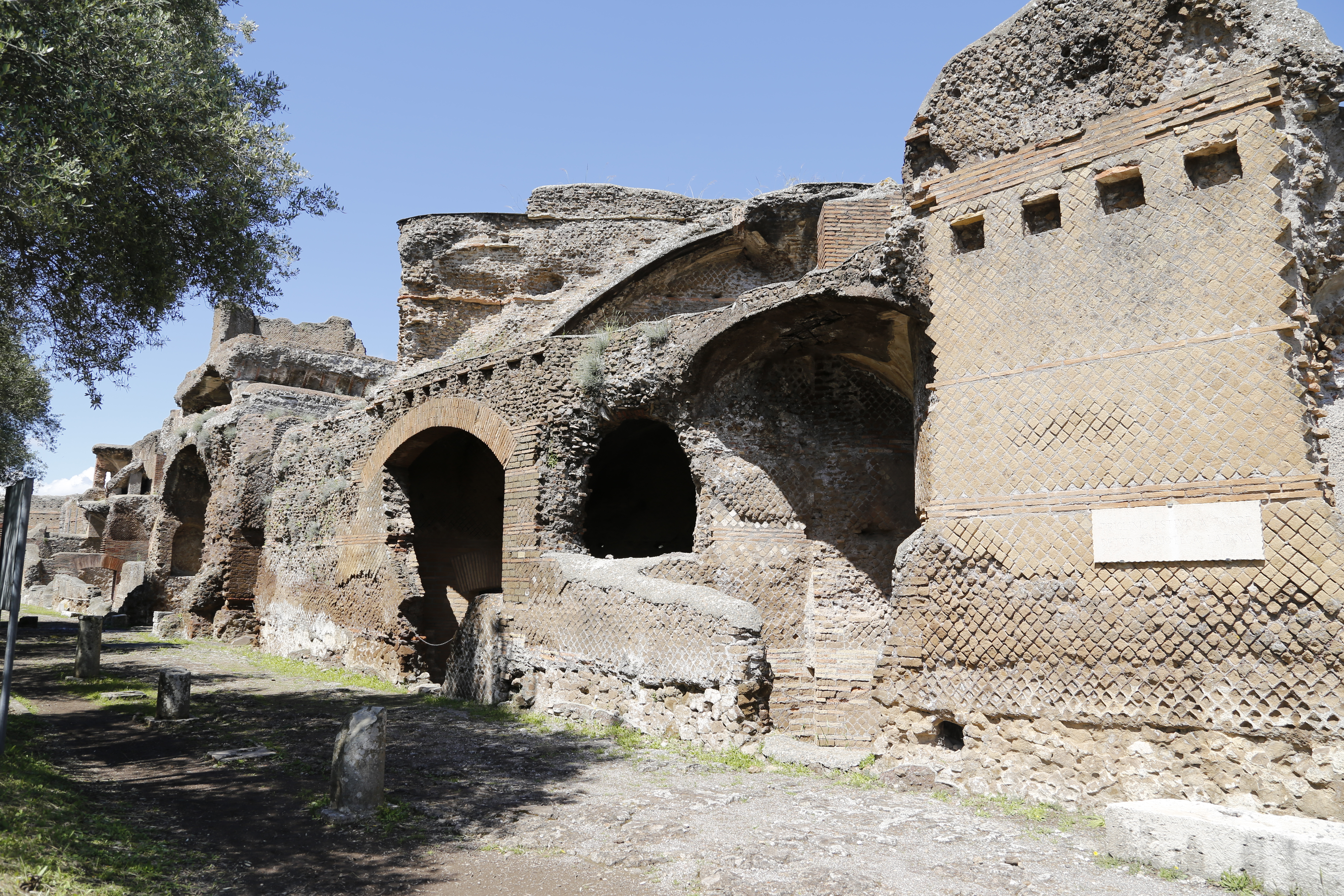
Latin library

The so-called Greek and Latin Libraries belong to a single complex together with the Courtyard and the Garden of the Libraries, and were named after the wrong belief that they were a development of the libraries of the Palace on the Palatine and of the Domus Aurea in Rome. The Greek Library is believed to have been built in 118, shortly after the Latin Library.

The courtyard is named after these two buildings on its north side. It is a large rectangular peristyle with 18 x 14 Corinthian columns enclosing the so-called Garden of the Libraries. It was built as the walled garden of the original Republican villa and later enclosed by the Hadrianic buildings. The portico was paved in opus sectile marble, a fragment of which is still visible. The new parts of the villa on the south side of the courtyard were dominated by the podium of the villa's first nucleus, supported by the Republican "cryptoporticus with Mosaic Vault" which extends on the east side to the Hospitalia (2) and the so-called Imperial Triclinium. The nymphaeum dating from the 2nd-1st century BC is at the centre of the north end and is well preserved. It is open to the south and had niches for statues and fountains. Its eastern and western sides are flanked by two passages that lead up to the Portico of the Libraries at its rear.

The "libraries" are on a different alignment to the peristyle and oriented to the north. The "Greek library" has several stories and on the ground floor has two adjacent cross-vaulted halls of different dimensions, both with floorplans of a Greek cross. The smaller hall, with a similar plan, has three large rectangular niches and three smaller semi-circular niches on the shorter sides. On the floor are the remains of a republican-styled coloured mosaic with a network pattern surrounded by two bands of black and white tesserae. The first floor has suspensurae supported by the extrados of the vault below, thus indicating that it was a heated room. The ground floor had no direct access to the upper floors which could be reached only by a long and complex path originating from the Maritime Theatre. In this building the stairs were independent and differentiated according to their function. The "noble" stairs were kept separate from those used by the servants assigned to the praefurnia (furnaces) for the first floor heating.

The "Latin library" also has two adjacent halls preceded to the north by a vestibule with a curved façade with two columns and two steps. One hall has a square plan with three niches on its sides and a cross-vault; the second is rectangular, apse-shaped and roofed with a barrel vault. On the opus sectile floor are the remains of an elaborate marble band, with a pattern of octagons inscribed in squares, rectangles divided into stretched rhombuses and triangles. Above were other floors, reachable by a staircase in a wing of the portico flanking the Hospitalia. A relief of Antinous-Bacchus found here in the 16th century led to the belief that his cult was held here. In 1881 Lanciani discovered a statue of Dionysus in a room under the stairs, today in the Museo Nazionale, as well as a cache of 2,672 silver coins.

These buildings could have been summer triclinia, based on that of the Domus Aurea and on their north-south orientation, but they might instead have been assembly halls, or belvederes.

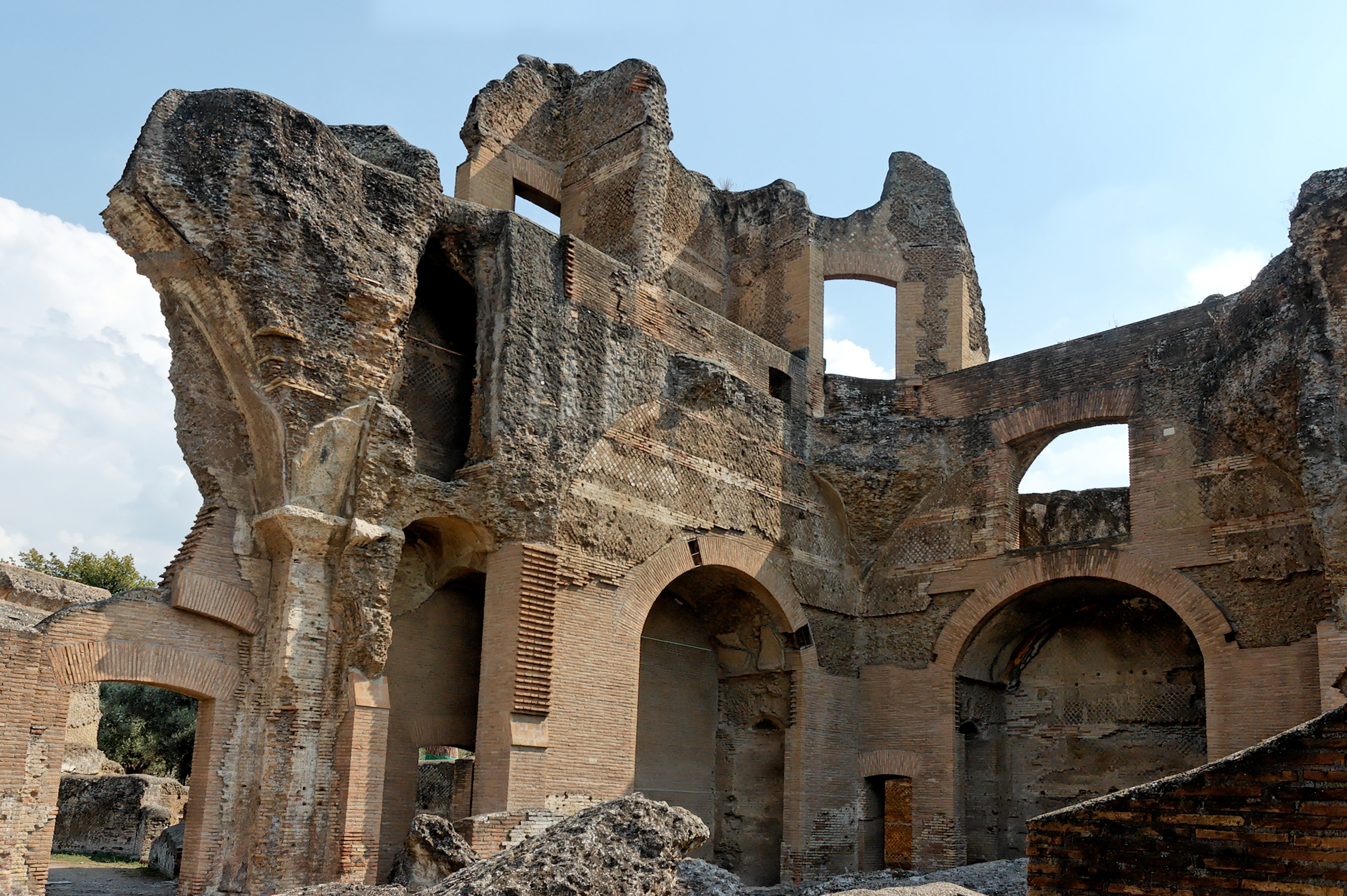
Greek library

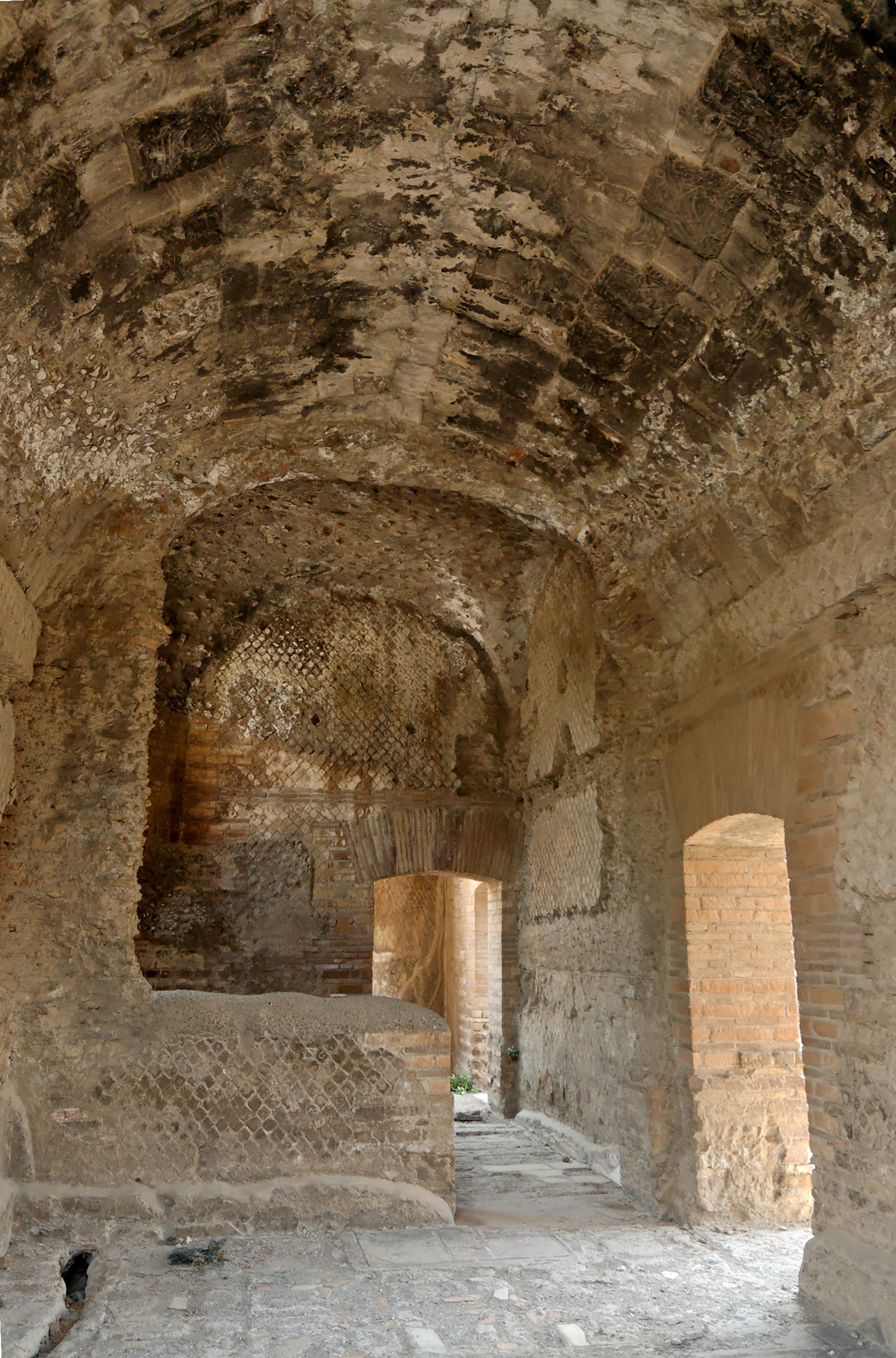
Greek library

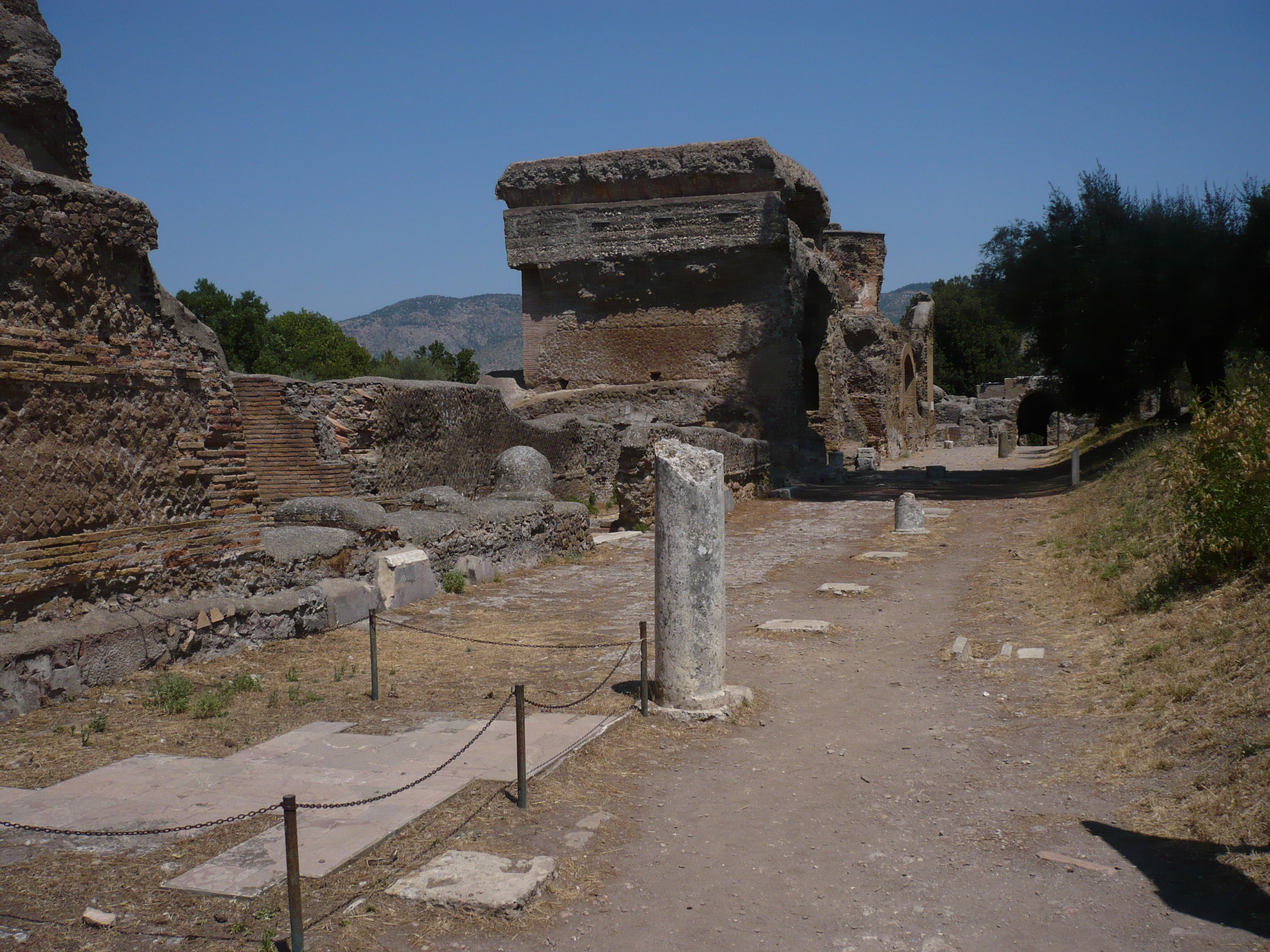
North portico

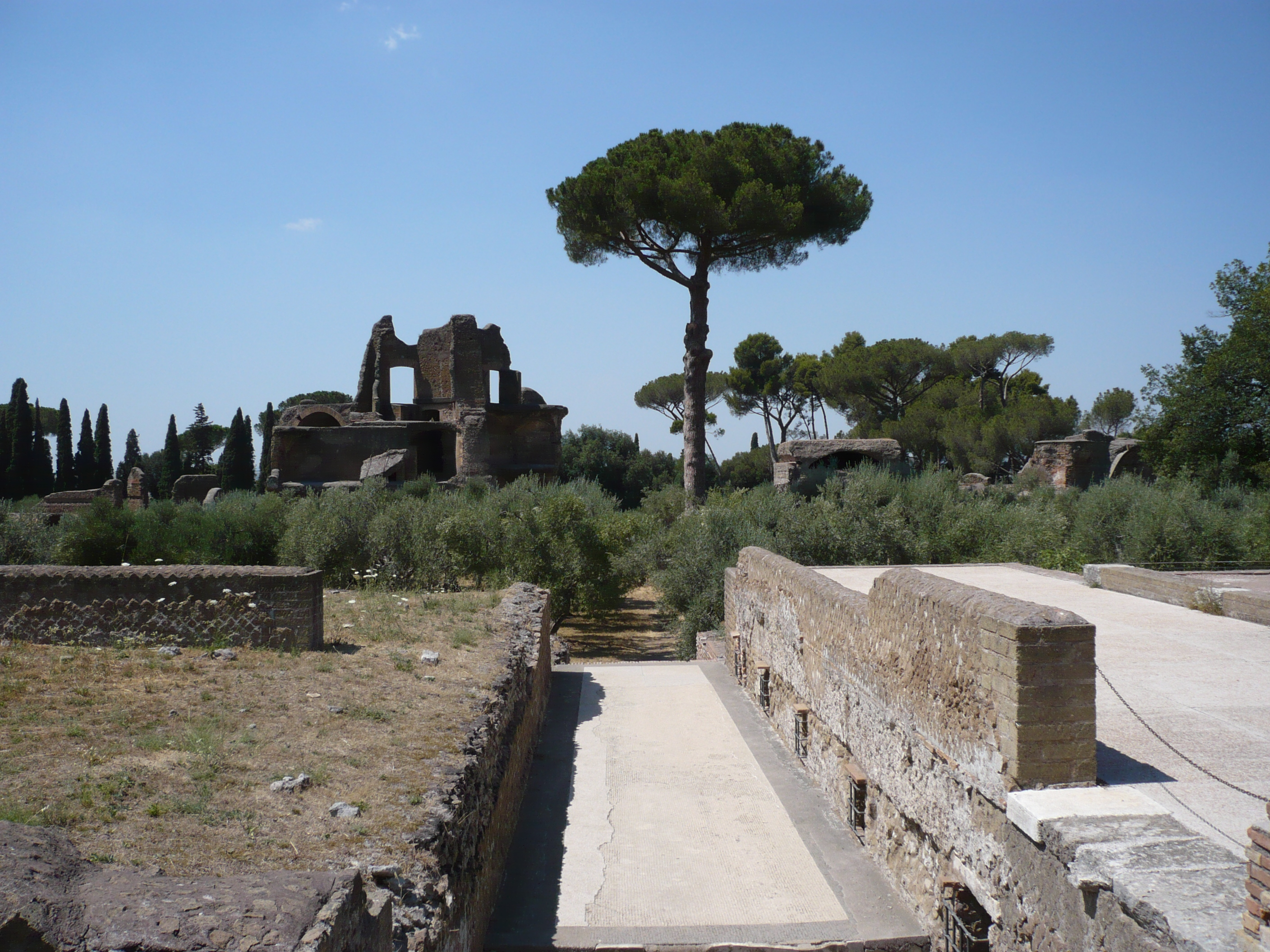
Courtyard

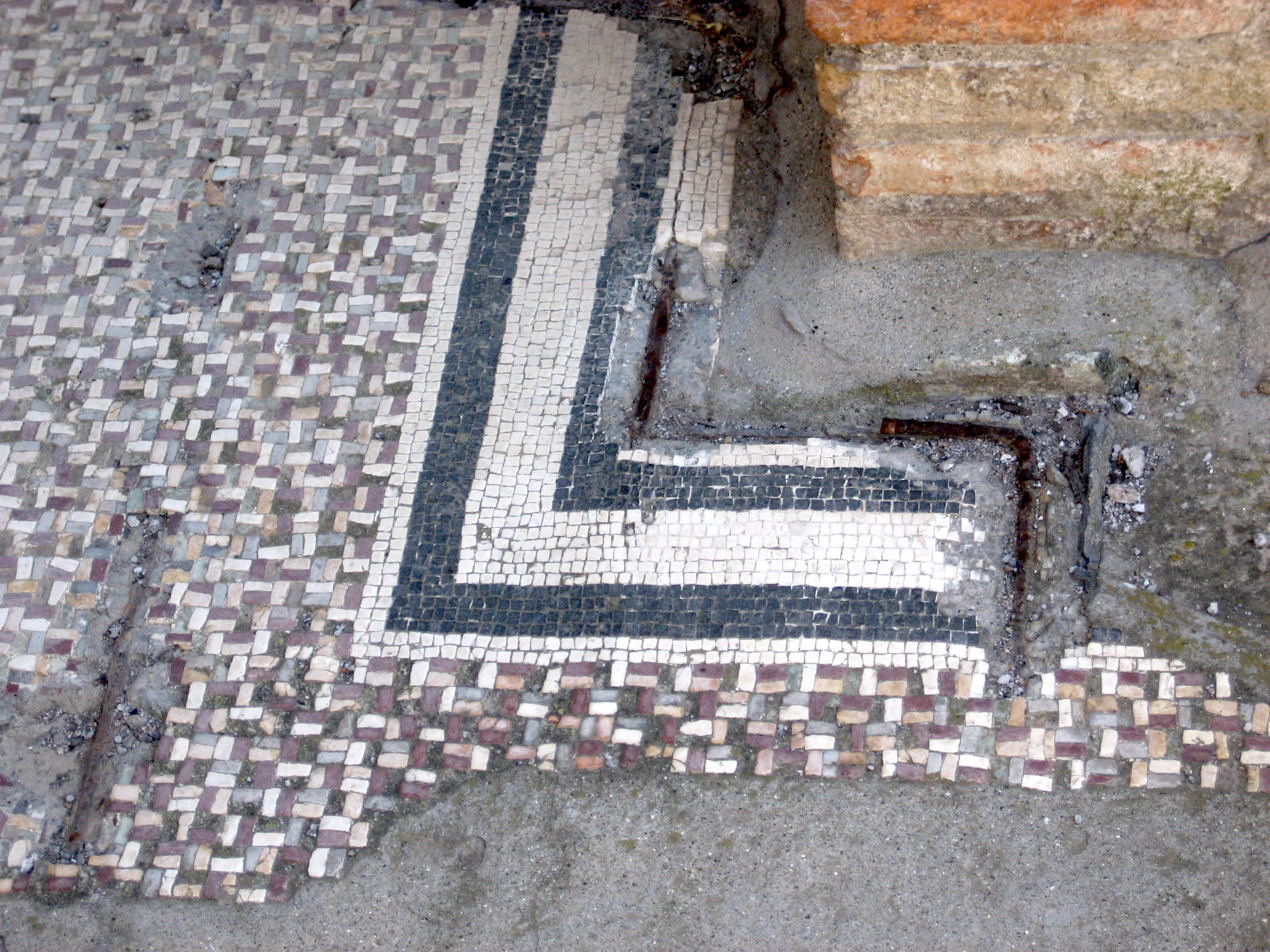
"Greek library" floor

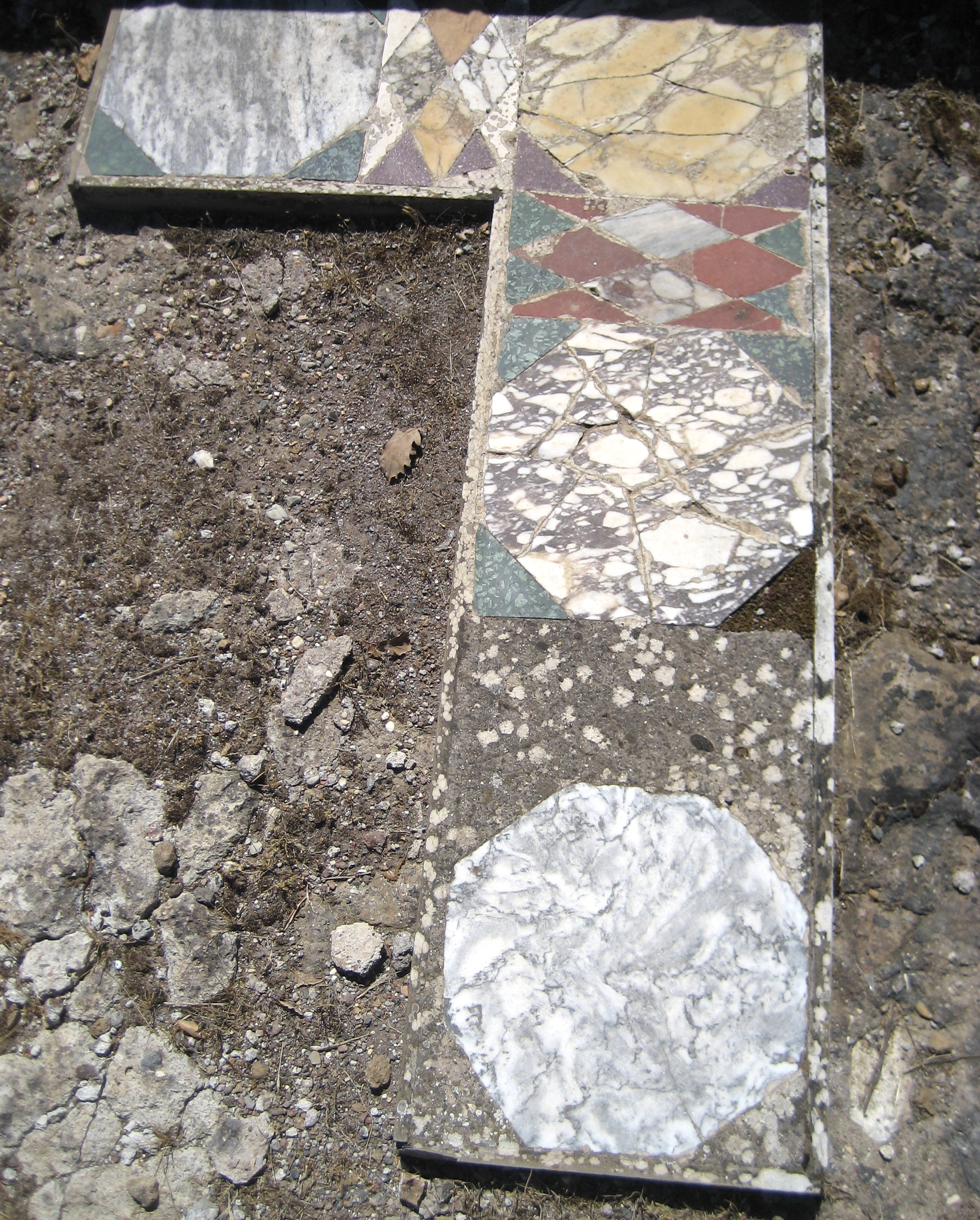
"Latin library" floor

=== Garden and terraces of the "Libraries" ===
The garden is named after the building complex to which it belongs and was created to link the old Republican Villa to the more recent parts to the west. It is on the upper terrace of the "Libraries" which is supported by a wall over 100 m long, adorned with alternating rectangular and curvilinear niches that probably contained statues and fountains. The two Libraries look on to the garden. Access to the garden on the west side was via a stairway, while from the north two staircases ascended in the centre of the wall from the lower terrace. In the garden is a long canal ending in two octagonal basins, furnished with bases for sculptures or decorative groups.

The lower terrace (24) was a vast garden supported on the north by a curved wall.

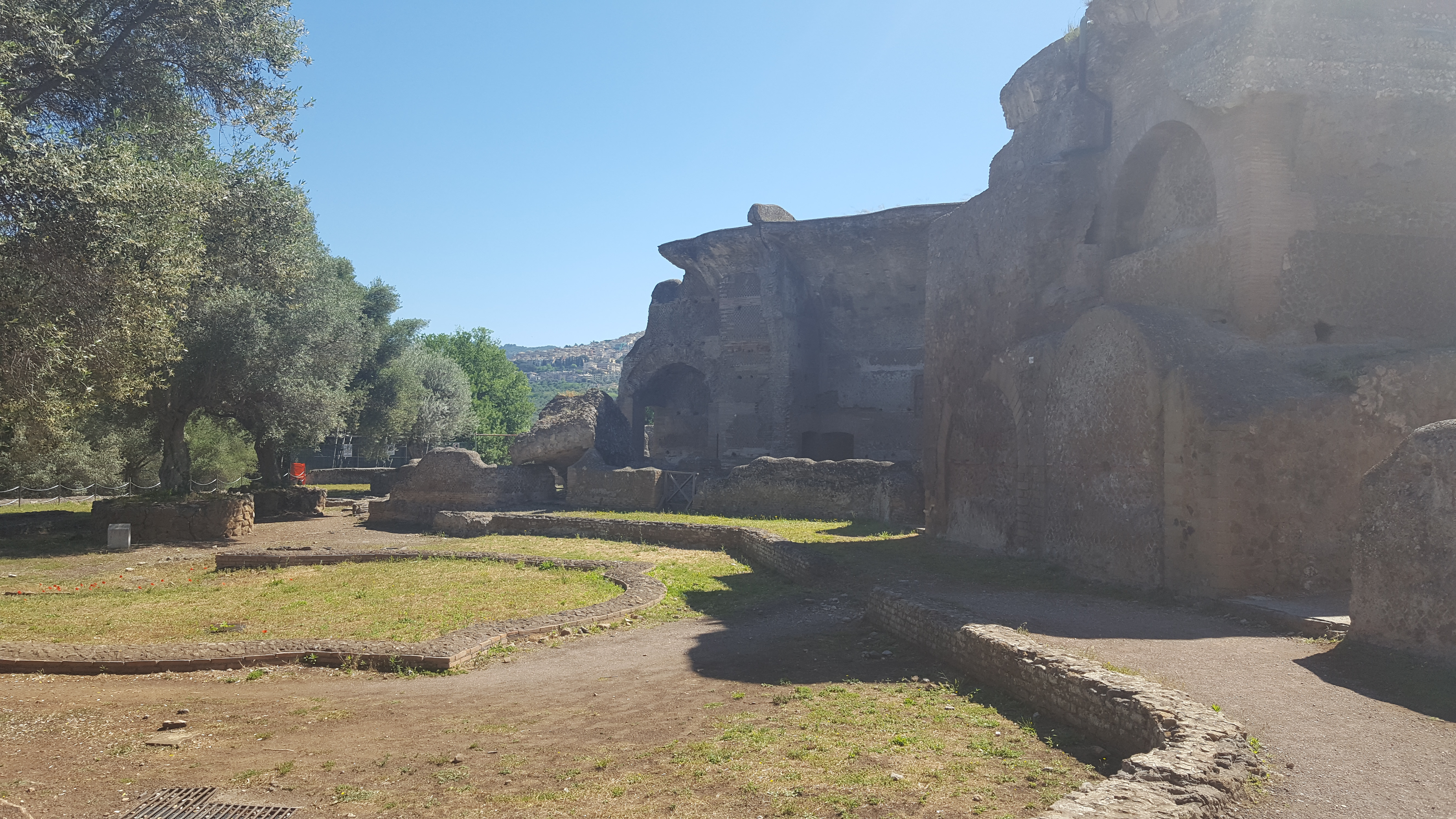

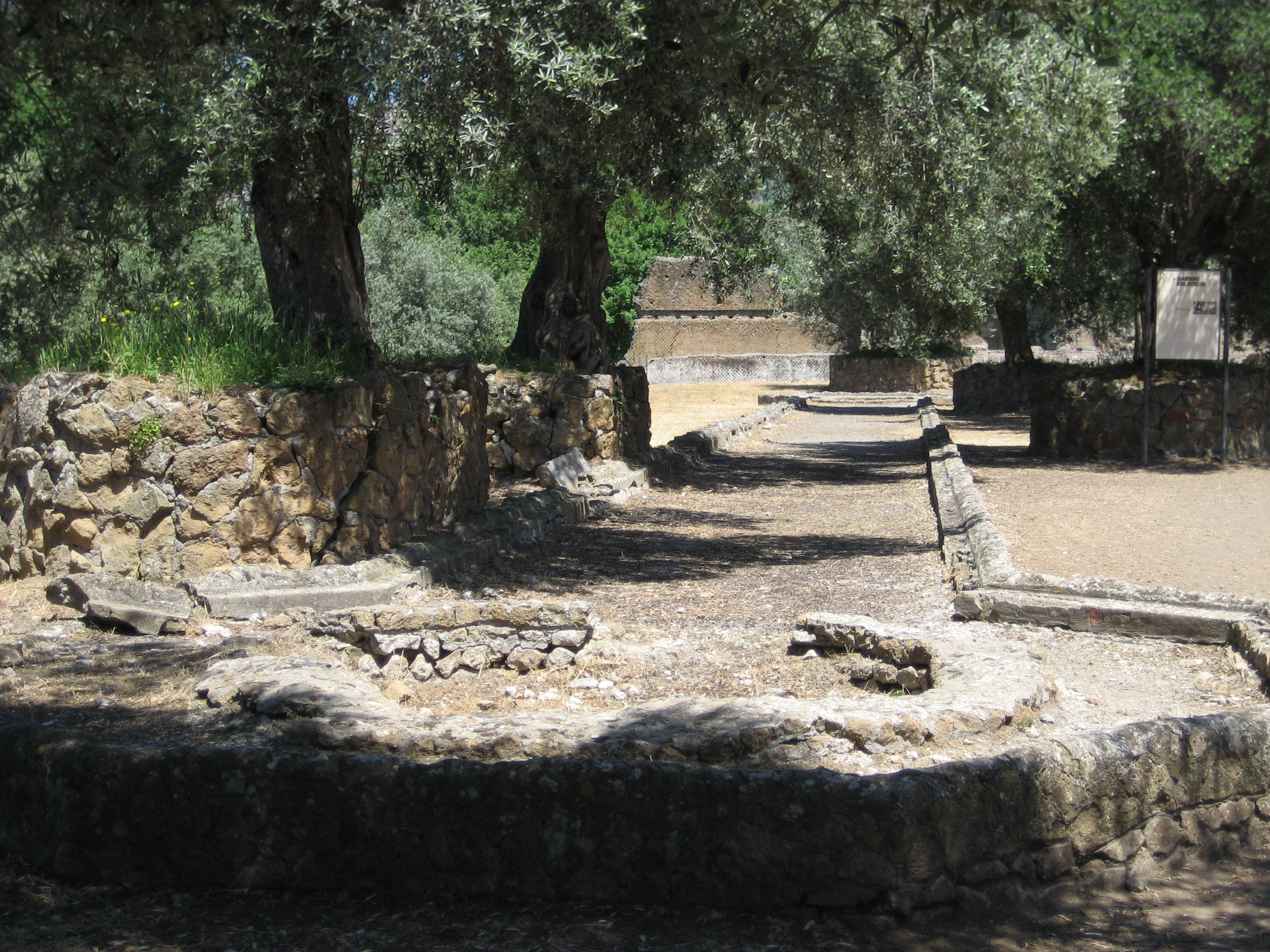
canal with octagonal basins

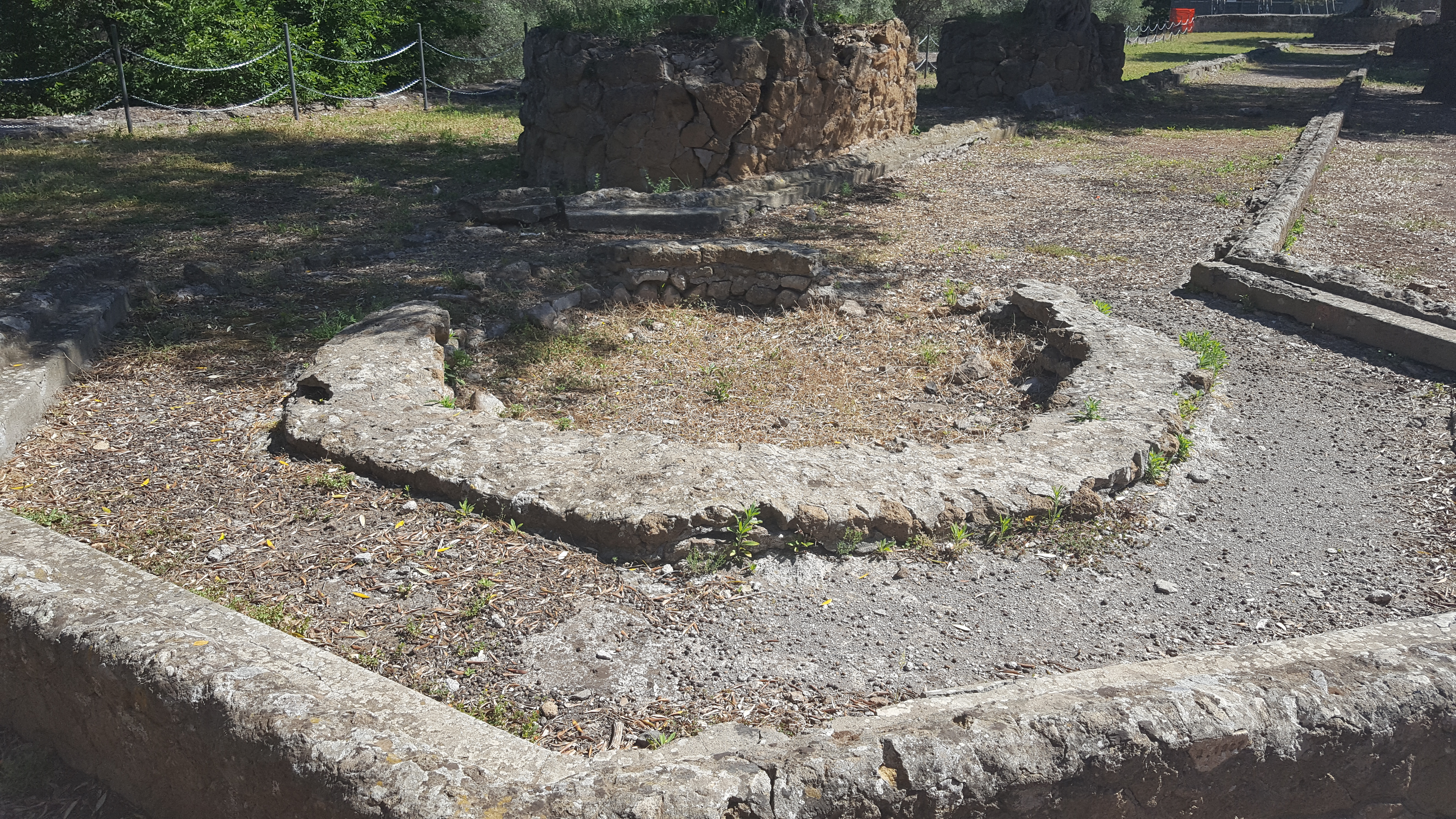

=== Hospitalia and Imperial Triclinium ===
These two buildings were in fact a single complete complex, equipped with a temple, triclinium, bedrooms, latrines, cryptoporticus and terrace. It was not used by the Emperor and the connections with the rest of the villa are all secondary and concealed. It was built in a space between the retaining walls of the garden of the existing Republican villa on the south side and the later Upper Gardens of the Imperial Palace on the east.

The Hospitalia has a long central room with 5 rooms on each side whose T-shaped plans constitute three alcoves in which beds were placed serving as bedrooms and indicating that the building was a dormitory for high ranking personnel. These rooms have outstanding monochrome mosaic floors with floral motifs (typical of the 2nd century AD) of a variety of elaborate patterns. Some secondary rooms had opus spicatum floors. A staircase led to the upper floor with other small rooms. At the end of the central room is a large hall which was probably was a sacellum (small temple) as it has a base for a statue or divinity. There are two communal latrines.

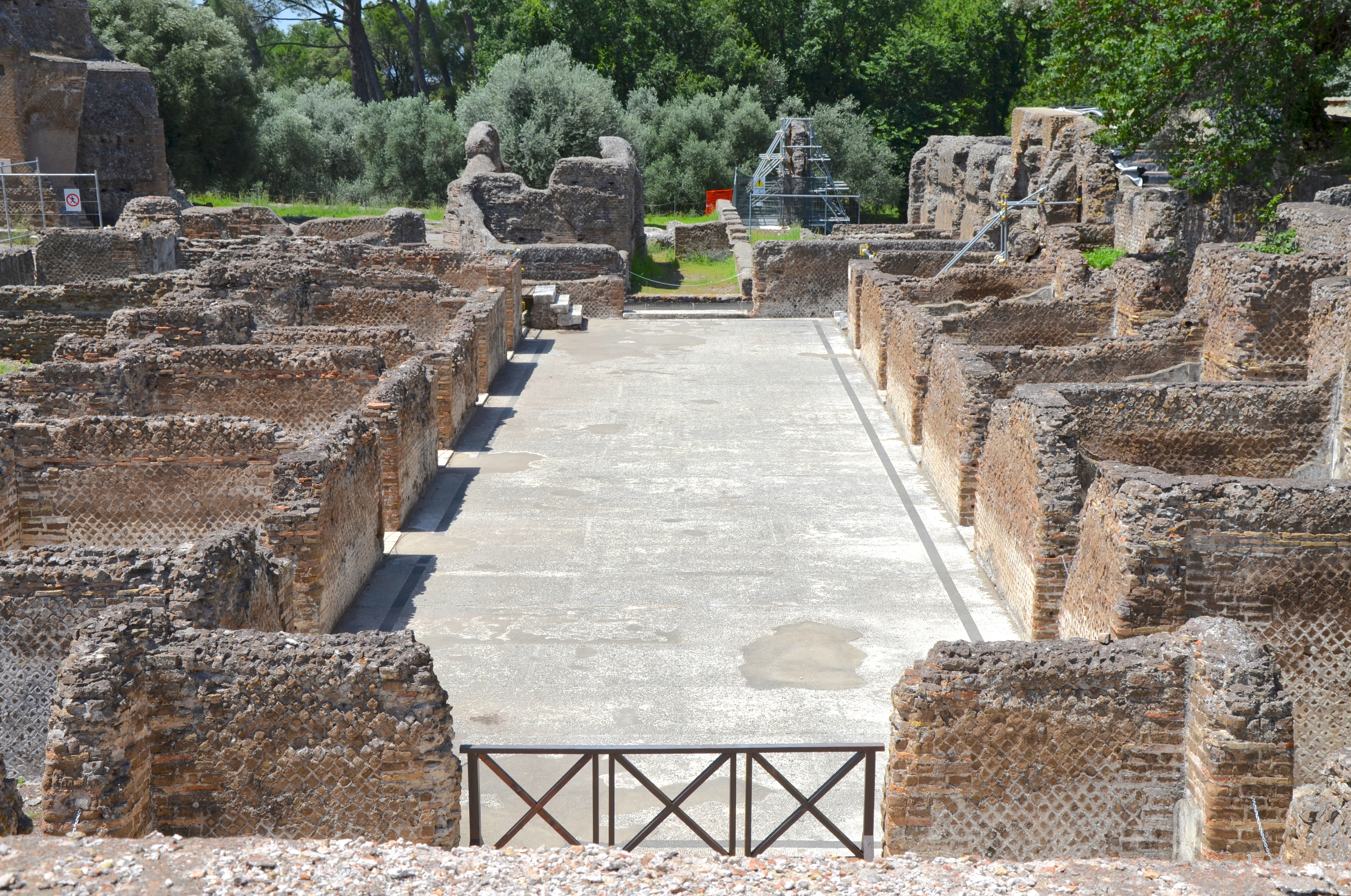
Hospitalia

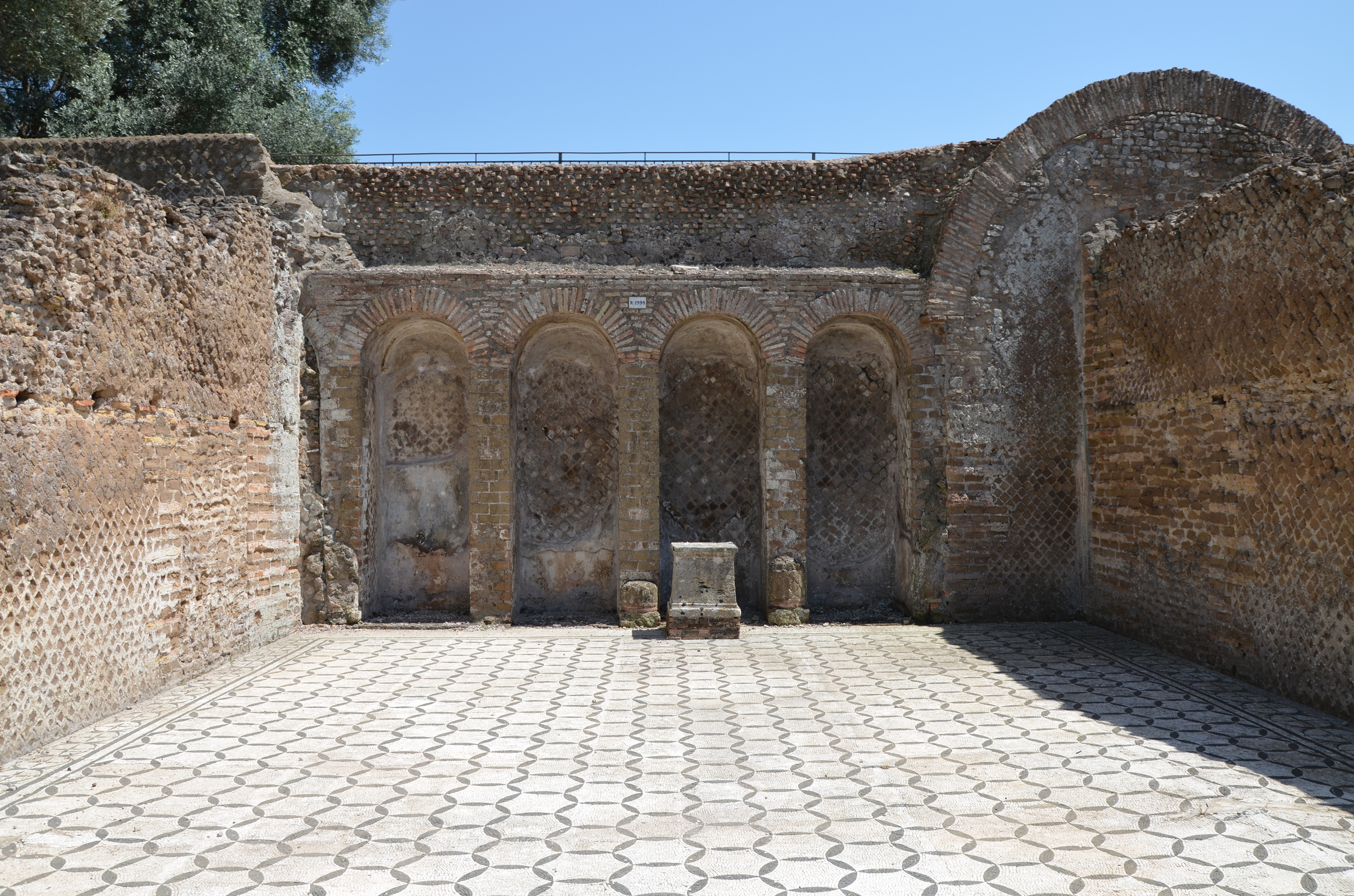
Sacellum of the Hospitalia

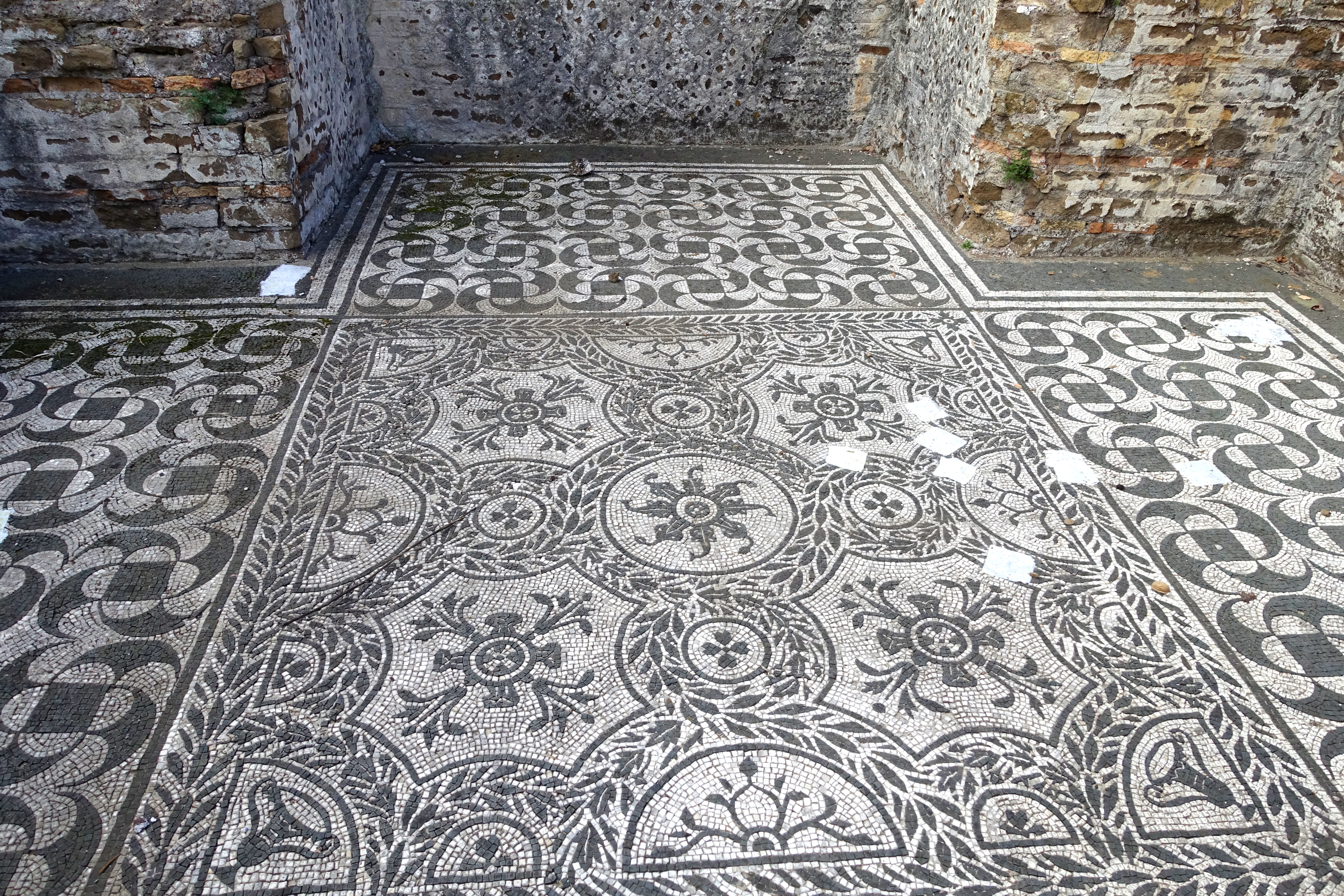
Hospitalia mosaics

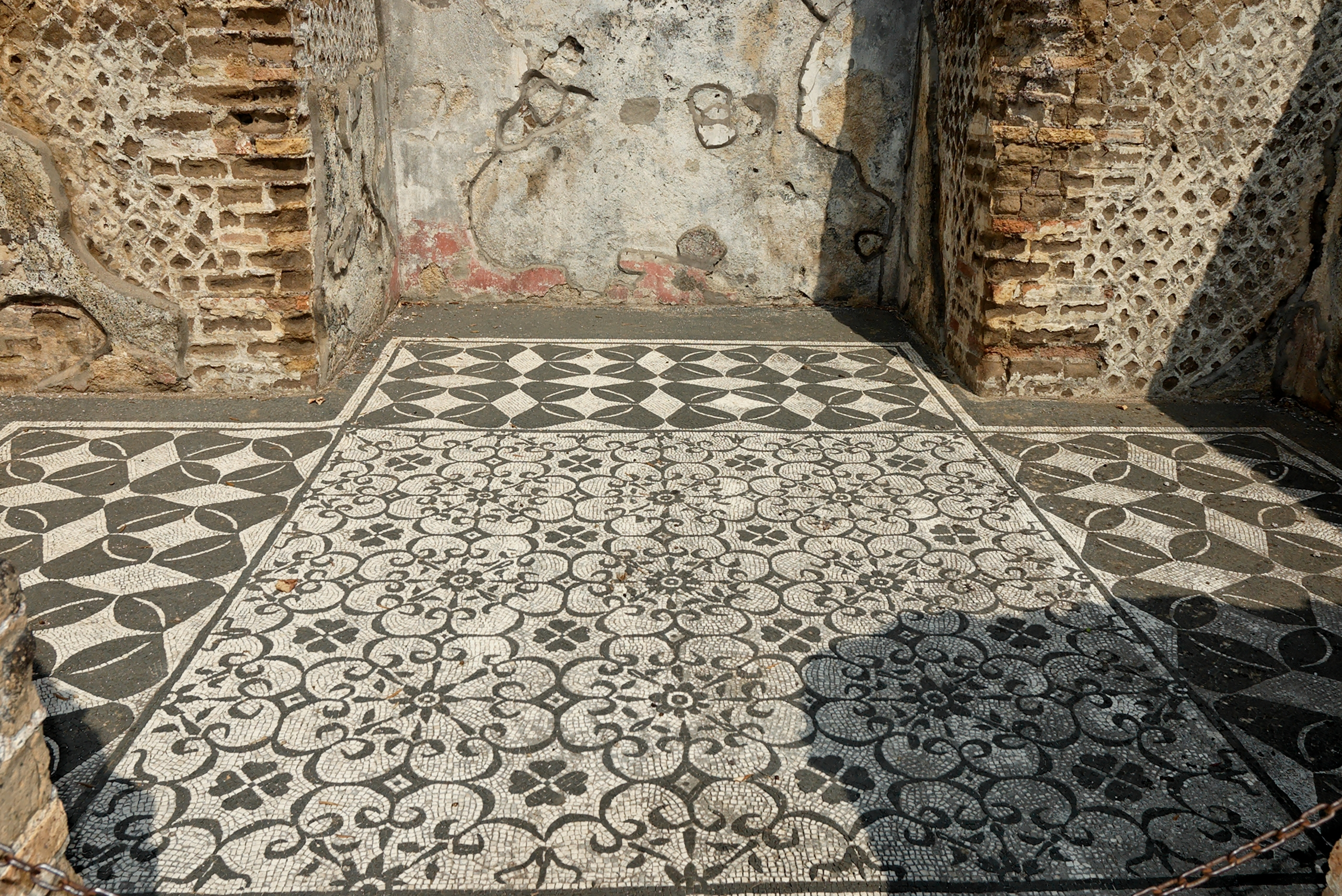

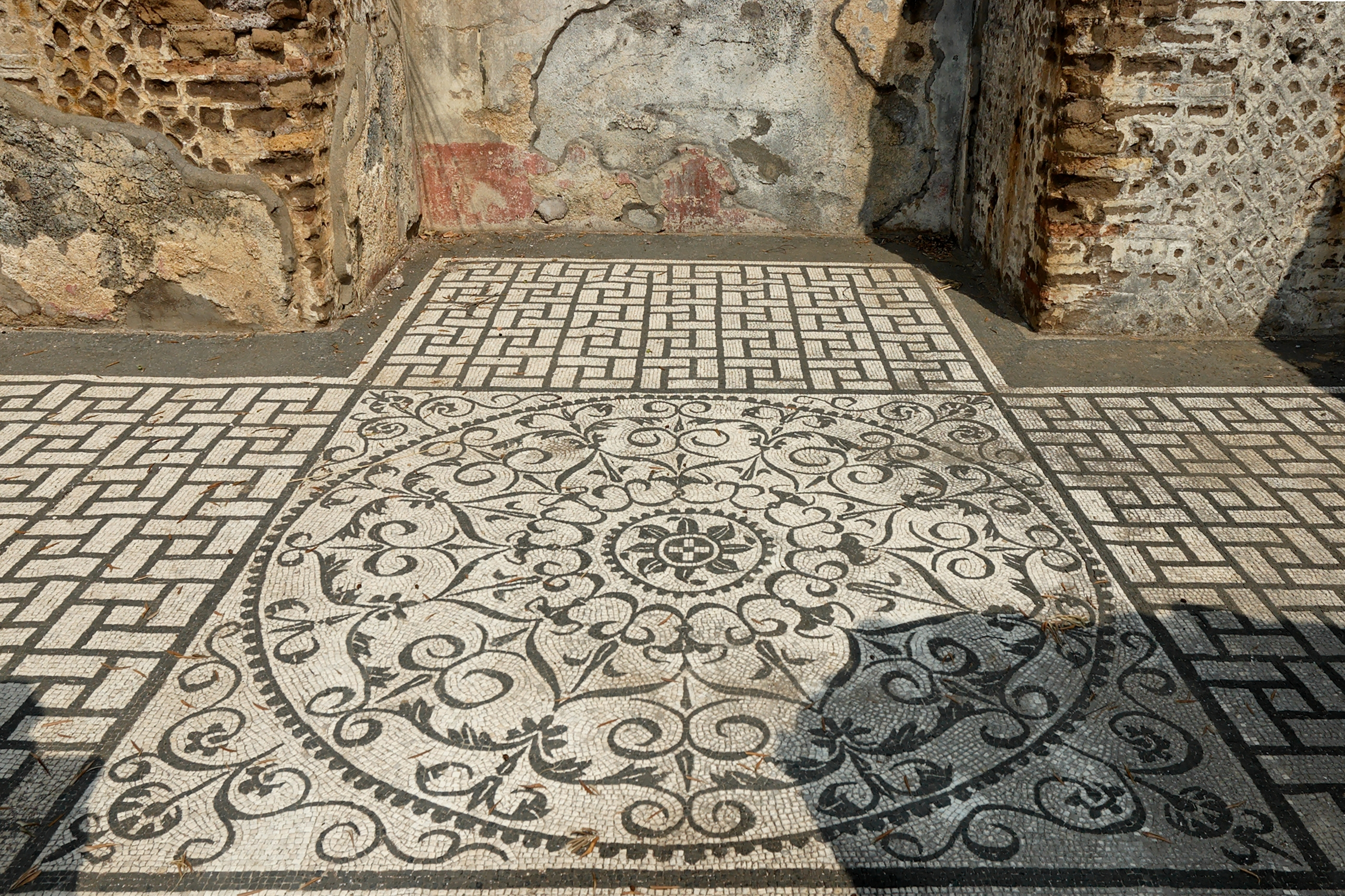

The so-called Imperial Triclinium lies on a Republican artificial terrace overlooking the "Valley of Tempe" and has two floors, the upper floor on the same level as the Hospitalia which is thought to be part of the same complex. The main room below is a large rectangular hall, with annexes and two columns at the front opening onto a portico and then to the garden terrace (Lower Terrace of the Libraries). These rooms are interpreted as the living area of the complex, including the large cenatio (dining room). The monochrome diamond pattern floor shows that the building was not for imperial use, although the room has rich sculptural foliage on capitals, but rather for high ranking personnel, such as the imperial guard or freedmen. A cryptoporticus on the southern side, illuminated by openings in the vault, could have been reserved for walks in the shade or in bad weather, or for the kitchens.

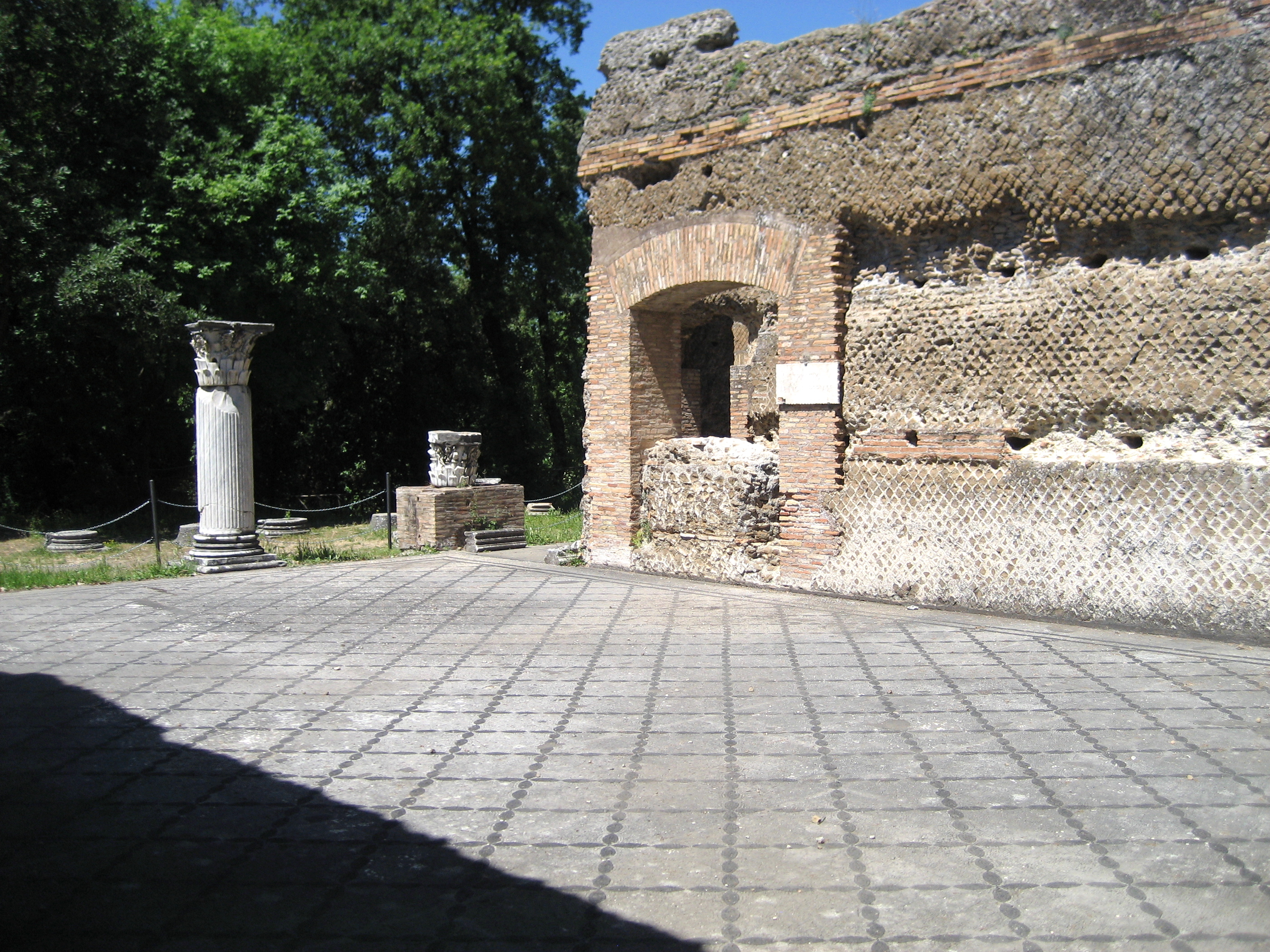
Imperial triclinium

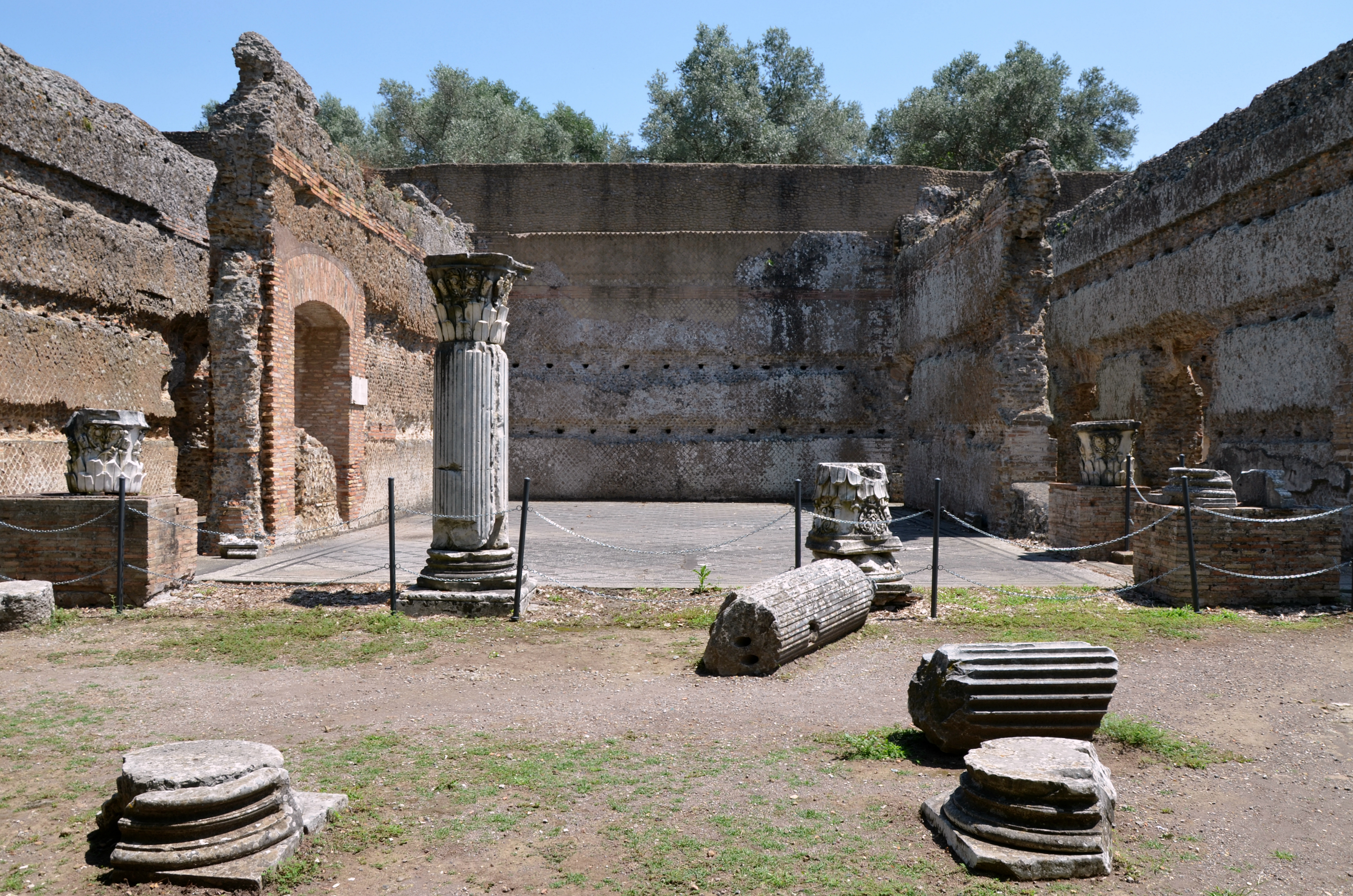

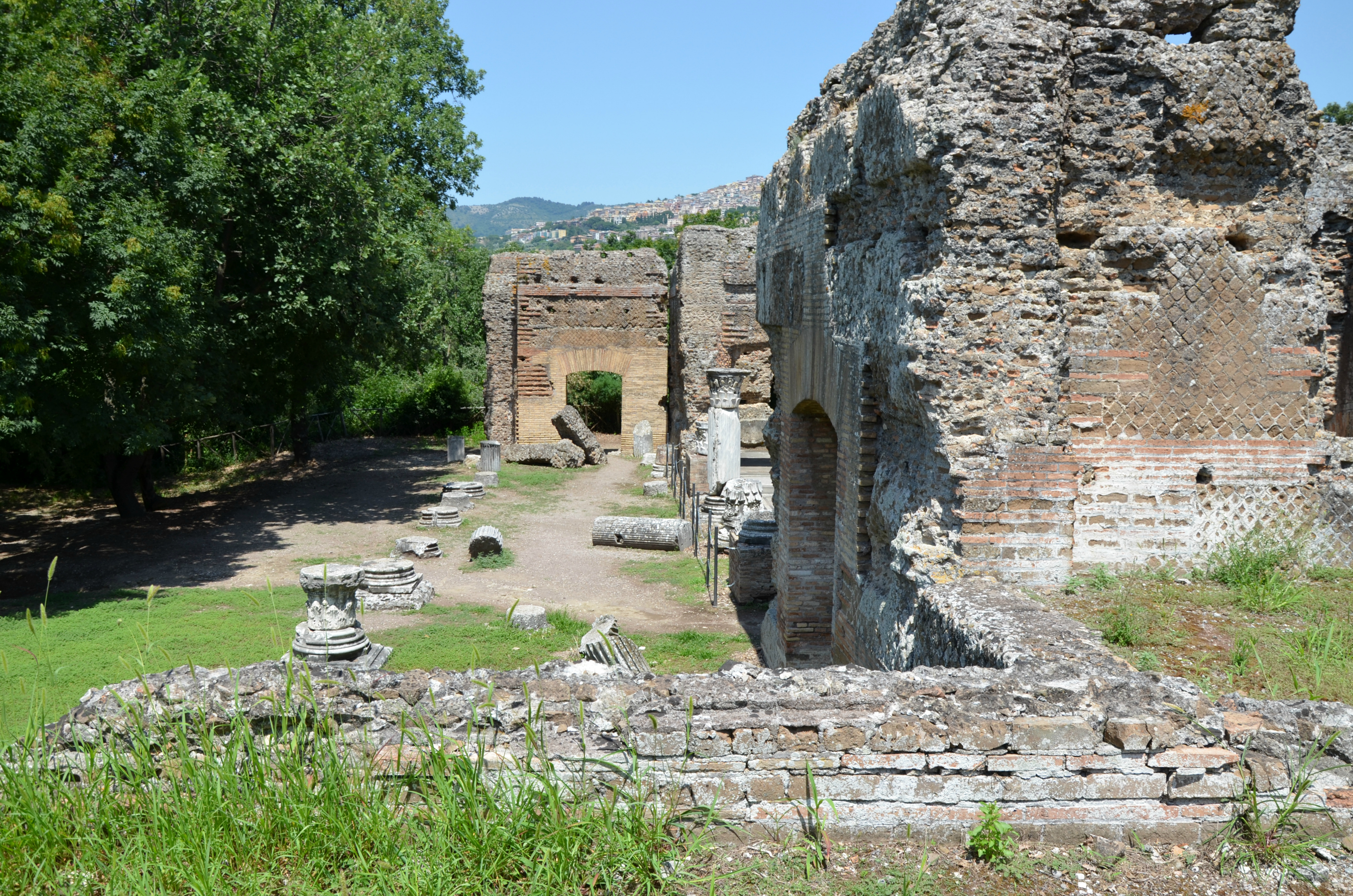
Imperial Triclinium portico

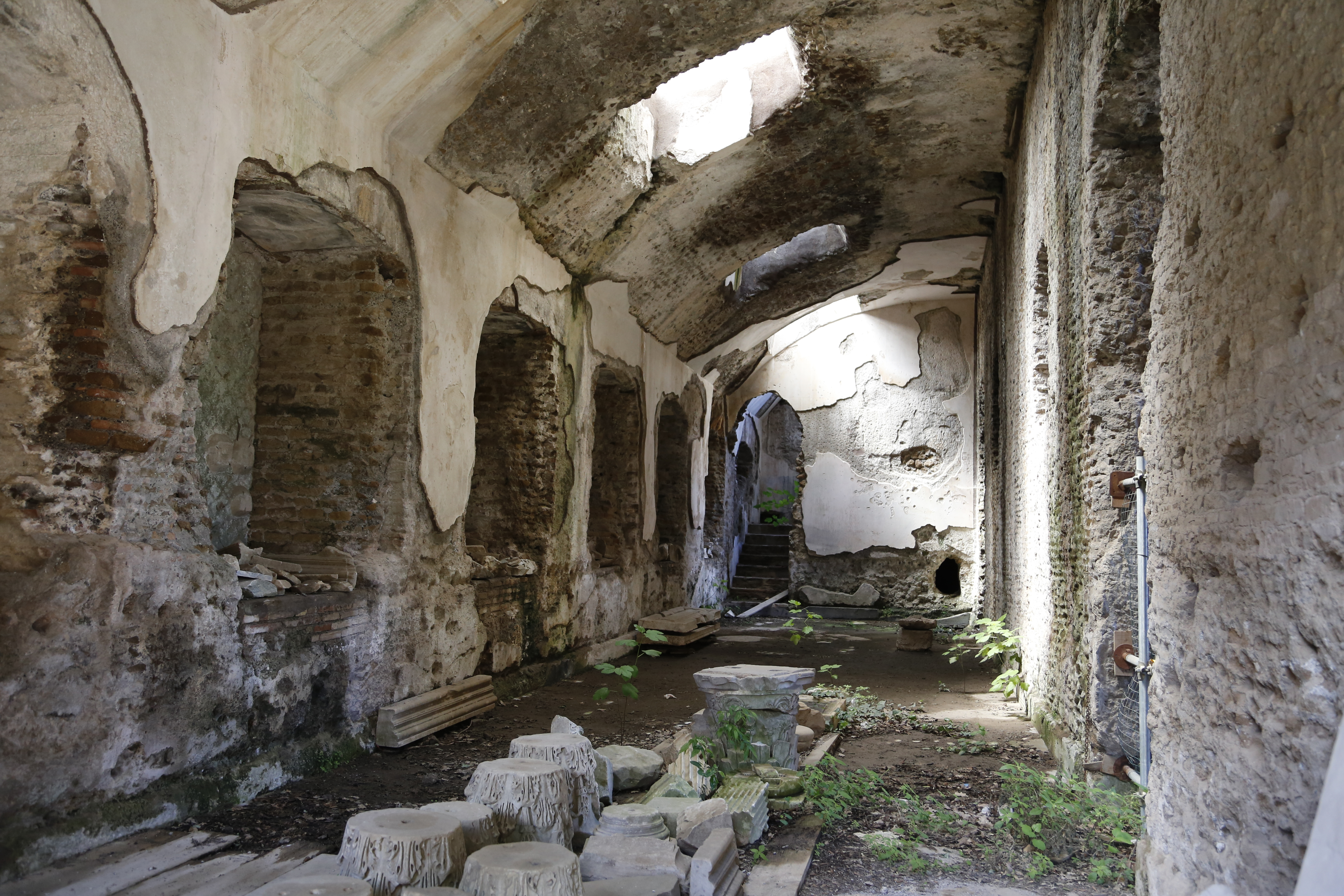
Cryptoporticus of Triclinium

=== Piazza d'Oro (Golden Square) ===
This was one of the most sumptuous and grandiose parts of the villa, and the modern name reflects its very rich architectural and sculptural furnishings which were the reason for its being systematically plundered several times, starting from the 16th century, in ‘treasure hunts’. Numerous famous marble sculptures and architectural elements from here entered the collections of foreign museums and collections. The importance of this space in the Hadrianic era as well as to subsequent emperors is apparent from the artwork recovered including imperial portraits of Sabina and of later emperors such as Marcus Aurelius (r. 161-180) and Caracalla (r. 211-217) testifying to its post-Hadrianic life.

The main peristyle (61 x 51 m) enclosed a large garden with a central canal flanked by a symmetrical series of flowerbeds and pools, surrounded by a portico leading to rooms on the sides. The impressive portico was divided into two aisles by alternating columns in cipollino and Egyptian green granite. Also corridors on the outsides of the east and west sides of the portico had walls separating them from the porticos which included a large number of rectangular niches.

On the north side was the main entrance from the direction of the palace through the vestibule covered by an "umbrella" dome, a wonderful example of the Roman mastery of vaulted space and typical of Hadrianic architecture. Also along the north portico on each side of the vestibule are two exedras, one with a remaining polychrome mosaic. Below these buildings was a cryptoporticus substructure connected to the subterranean road network.

On the eastern side of Piazza d'Oro is the large domed triclinium in front of which was an oval water basin that dominated the Valley of Tempe.

The south side of Piazza d'Oro has a series of curvilinear rooms centred on the monumental octagonal exedra which was covered by a cavernous dome. Here the rooms have sometimes concave, sometimes convex forms, creating a beautiful visual interplay. The careful arrangement of these rooms scenically frames the semicircular nymphaeum at the end of the building. The nymphaeum wall had seven alternate semicircular and rectangular niches, framed by columns and lined with precious marbles, and from which jets of water fell into a pool. The nymphaeum created the atmosphere of an elegant grotto and was probably a summer triclinium.

The use of precious colourful opus sectile marble for most of the floors of this building (with the exception of the two exedras to the sides of the vestibule, which nevertheless featured refined glittering polychrome mosaics) while the walls were all revetted with precious marbles, indicate that this part of the villa was used for "public" functions of the palace, even if in a relatively secluded position. The play of water, with its sound and scenic effects, gushing from the monumental nymphaeum, running along the central pool and supplying the fountains in the garden, then disappearing underground before reaching the Vestibule would have been striking.

The building has also been interpreted as the emperor’s private library, following an archaeological comparison with Hadrian's Library in Athens, a monumental library he built in the same years, and which had a large central exedra with niches for statues flanked by large rooms. The numerous niches visible in the side corridors of the Piazza d'Oro could have housed the papyri of a large library.

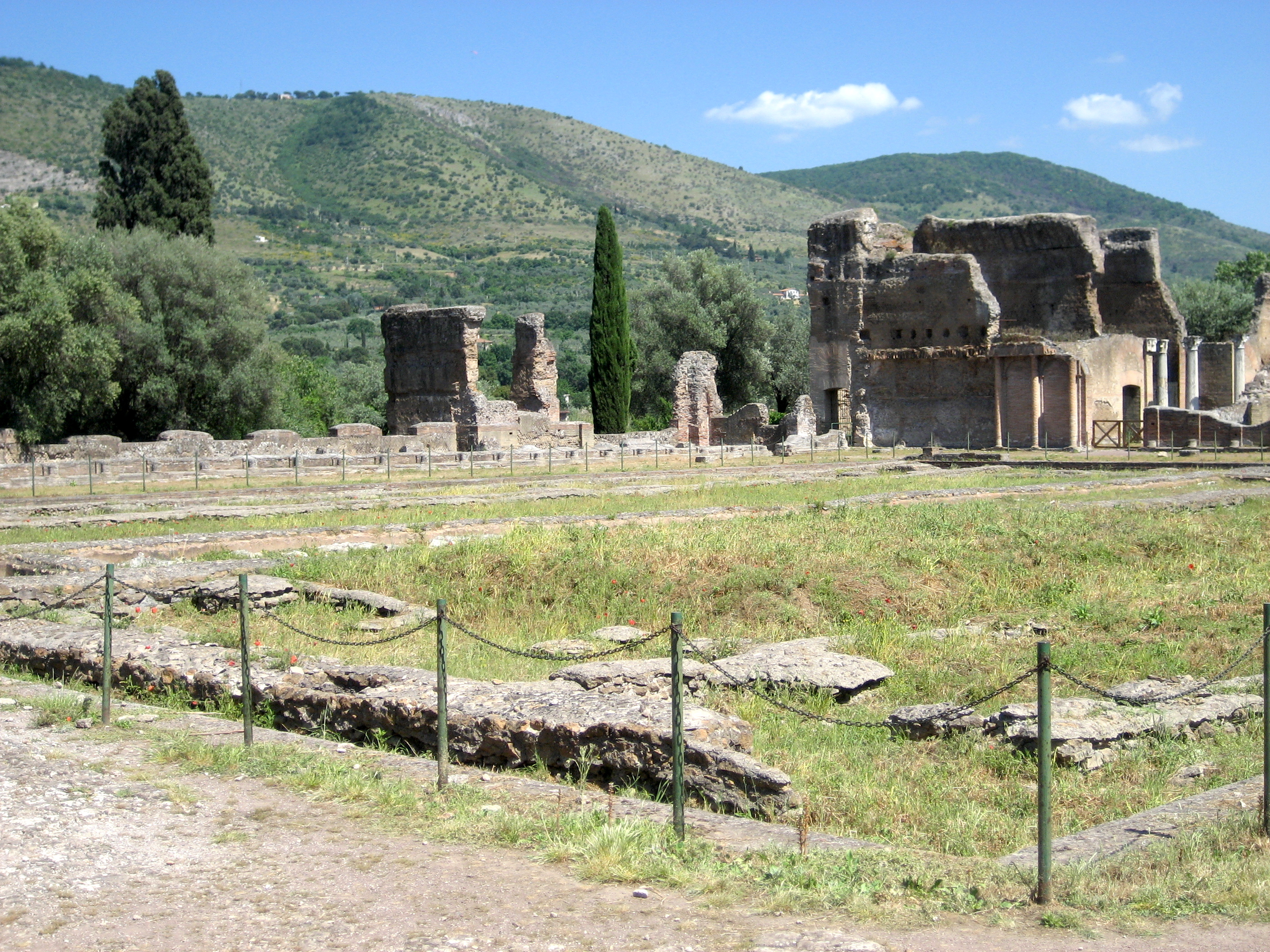
Eastern portico

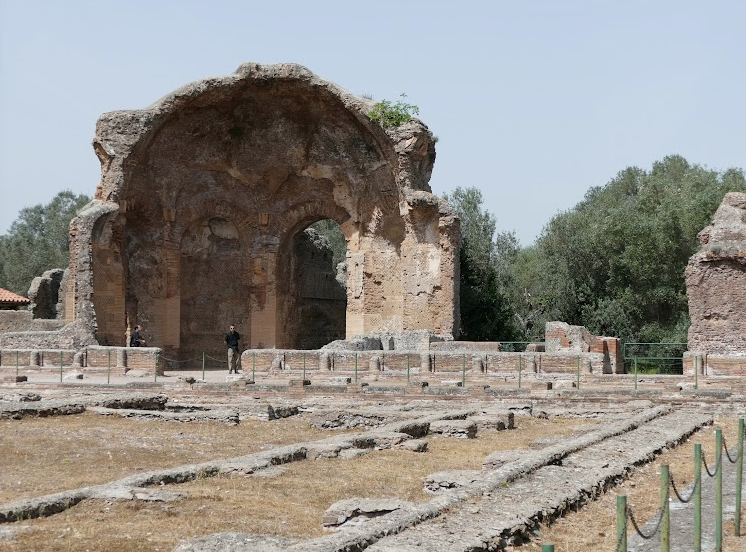
Northern entrance vestibule

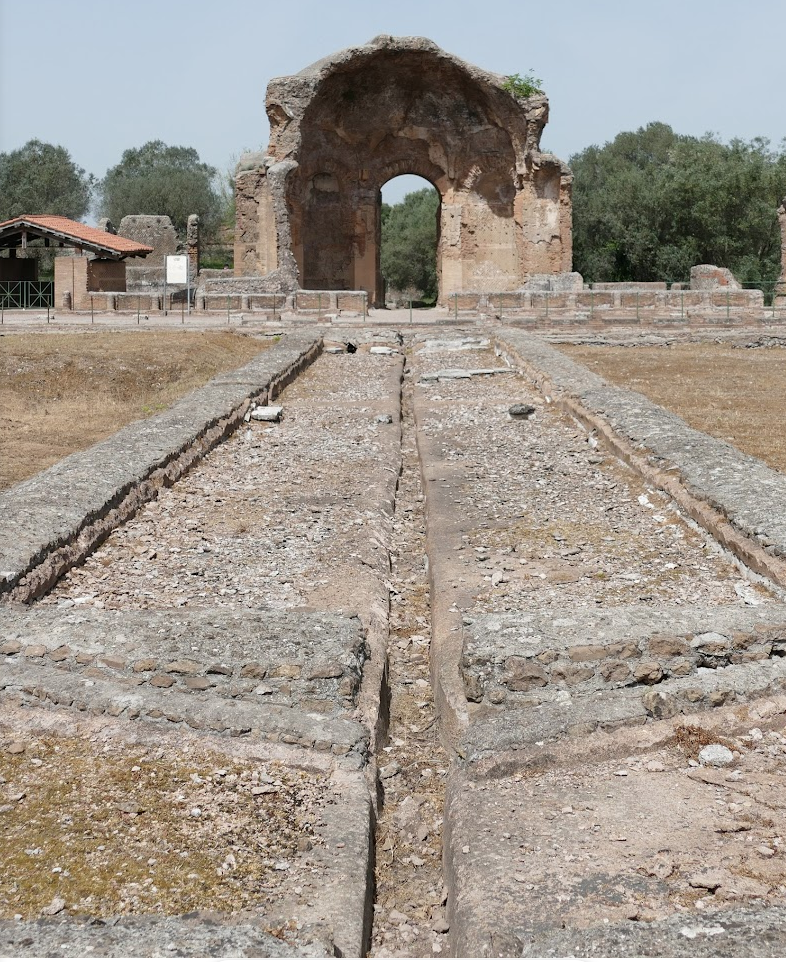
Northern portico and water garden

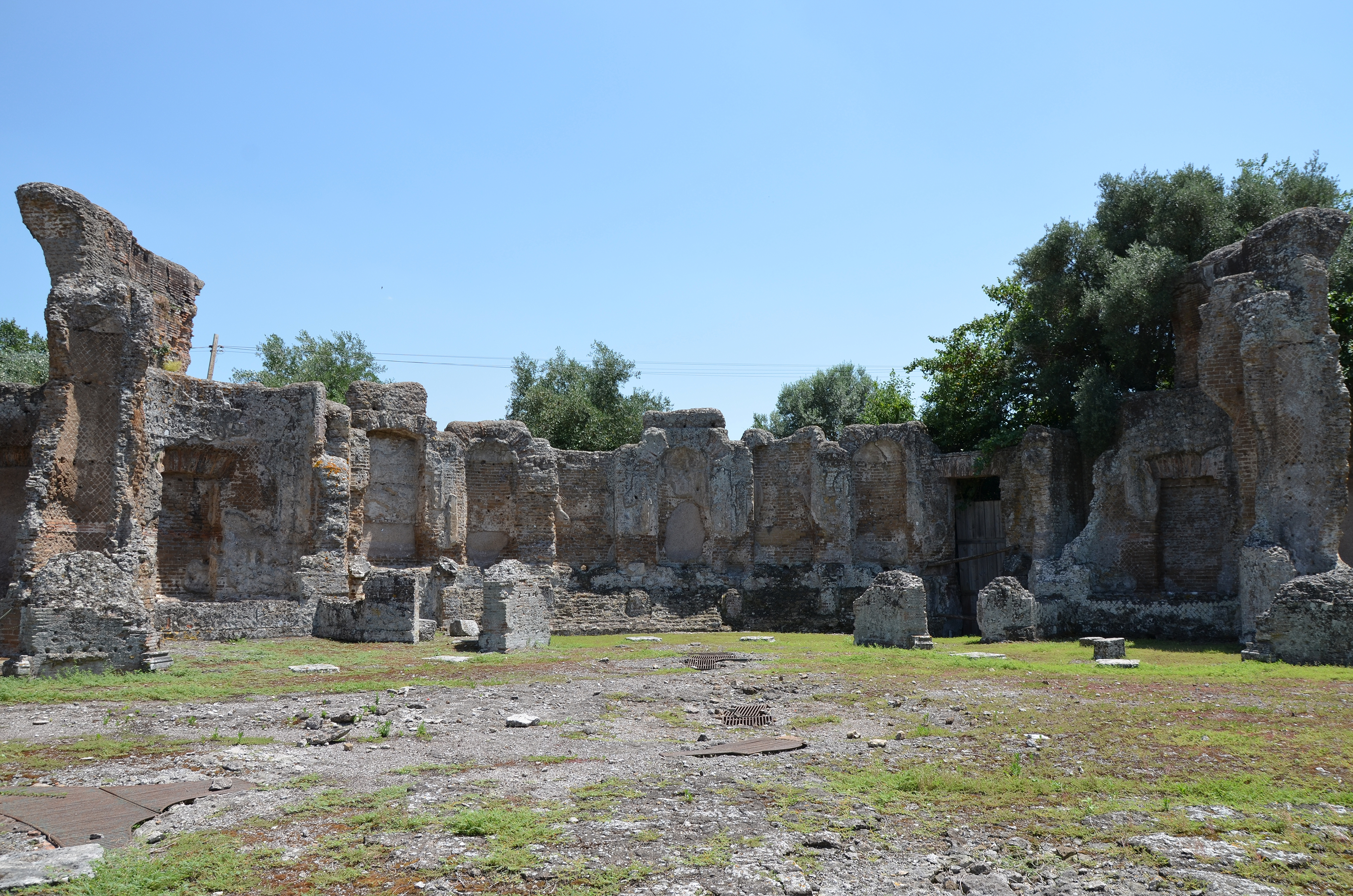
Southern octagonal exedra with Nymphaeum

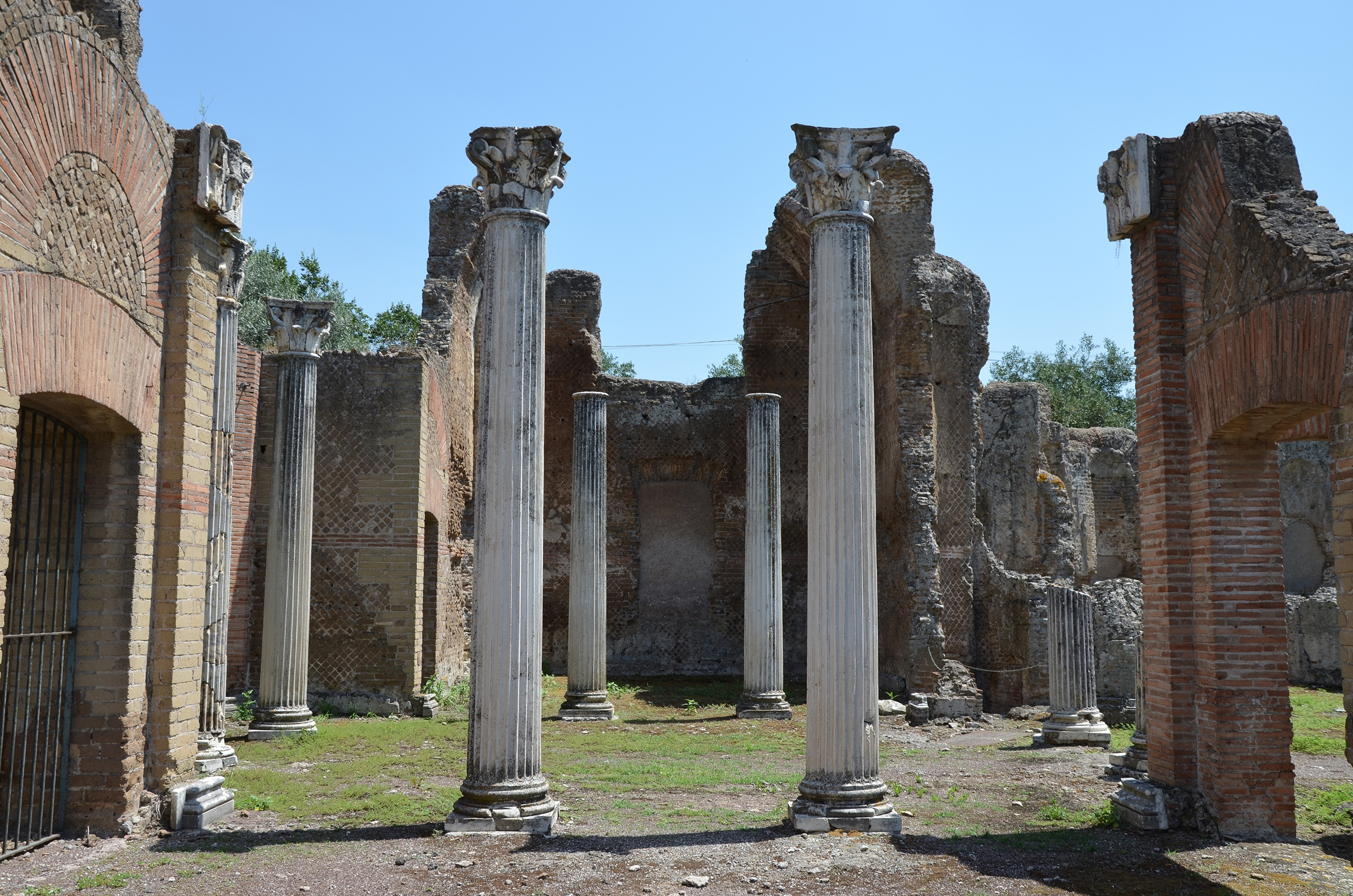
Southeastern peristyle

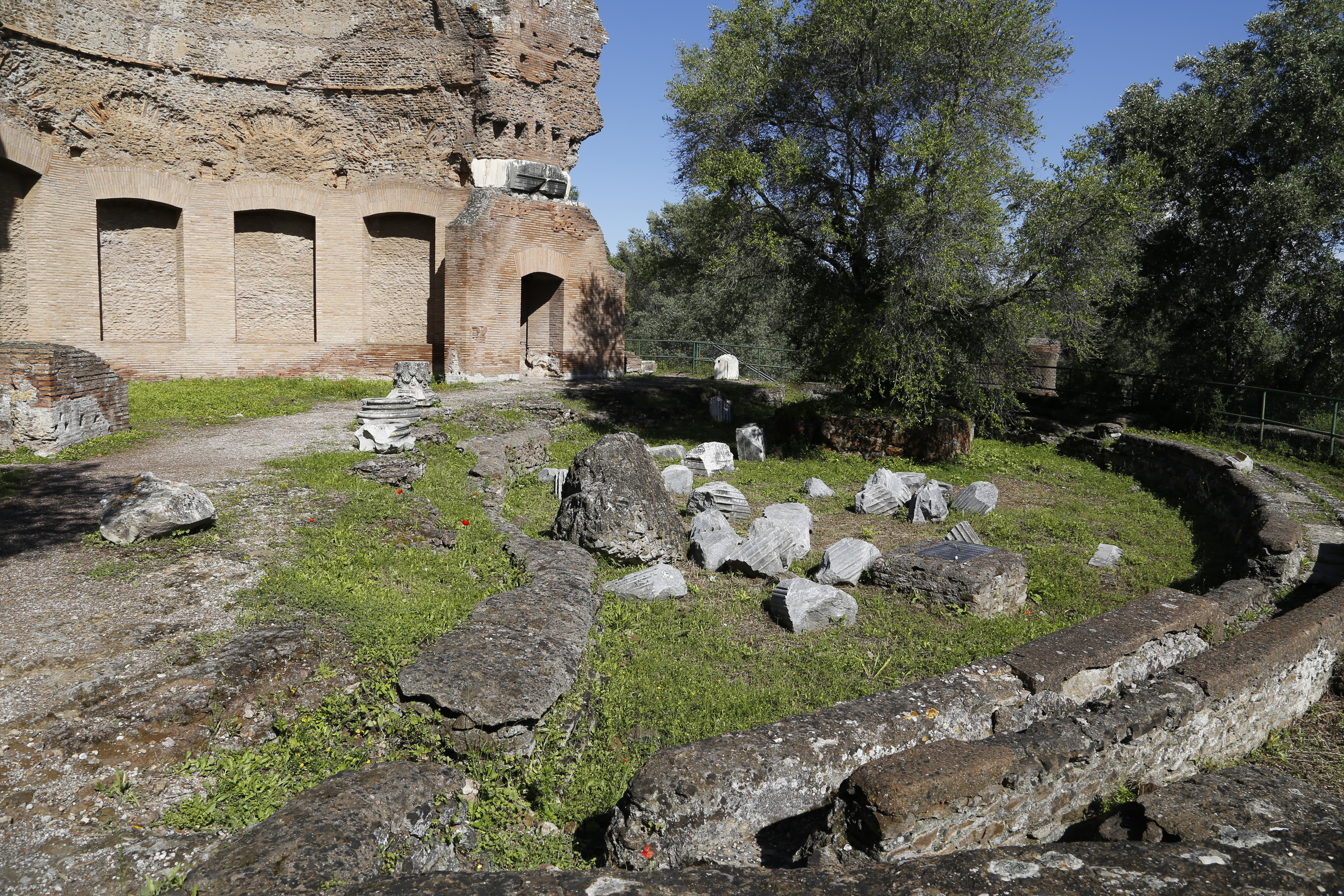
Northeastern triclinium with oval pool

=== Casa Colonica ===
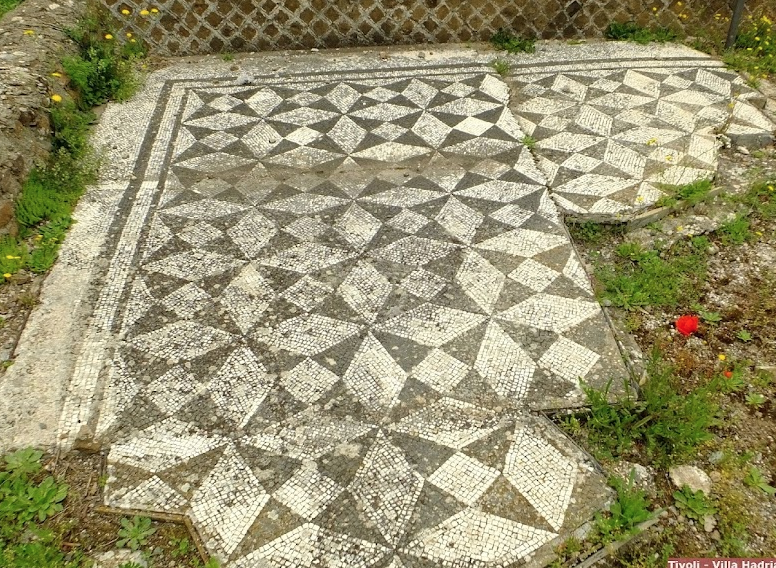
floor of Casa Colonica

Behind the portico on the north side of the Piazza d'Oro and near to the palace is the Casa Colonica, the rooms of which had monochrome mosaics with little decoration showing that it was meant for the villa's servants, being near the entrance to the cryptoporticus and to the Firemen’s Headquarters. It was probably part of the Republican villa incorporated into the palace since it has the same orientation, and some of the rooms were truncated along with their mosaics with black frames to make space for the construction of the entrance to the Piazza d'Oro.

=== Maritime theatre ===
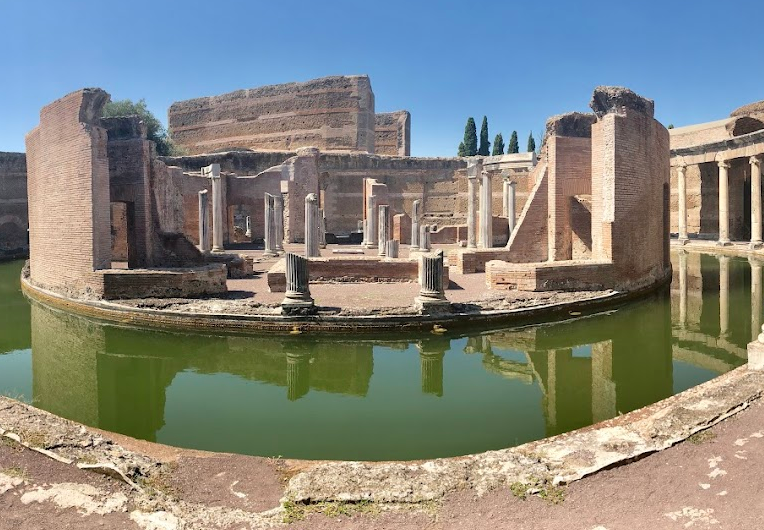
Maritime theatre

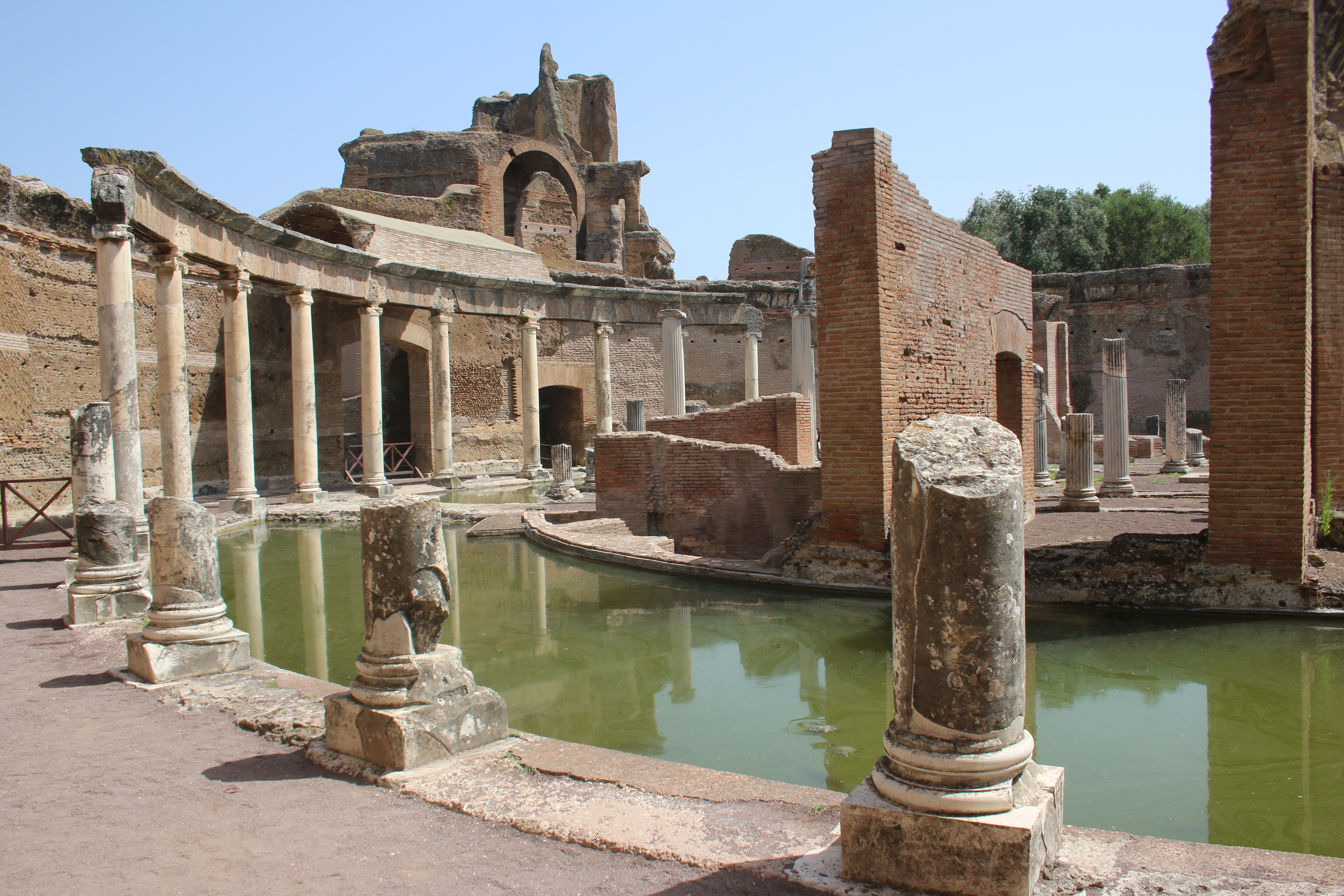
Maritime theatre

The "Maritime Theatre" is considered a masterpiece of Roman architecture and one of the most extraordinary and original buildings of the villa. It has no relation to the usual form of a Roman theatre, but is so-called due to its shape and marble friezes depicting marine subjects such as tritons, nereides and cupids racing on chariots pulled by different animals.

It was a miniature domus built on an artificial islet surrounded by a circular moat. It plays a key role in the general layout of the villa, since it joins buildings on different orientations, especially the Imperial Palace with the Baths and the Porticus Miliaria.

It consists of a circular portico with a barrel vault supported on Ionic columns, inside which is the ring-shaped pool, paved with marble slabs and with a central island of 25 m diameter. On the island sits a domus, complete with an atrium with portico and small garden, a library, a triclinium and small baths, all with a symmetrical plan which is rare in Roman architecture. The rooms are arranged around a peristyle with four convex fronts facing the centre, fluted lonic columns and a central fountain. The rooms to the west are baths including a room with a bath-tub that has a few steps down to the moat, which was probably a swimming pool. The island was connected to the portico by two wooden drawbridges.

It was one of the first buildings of the villa begun in 118. It has been interpreted as Hadrian's first temporary residence on the site as the private part of the palace.

=== Hall of Philosophers ===
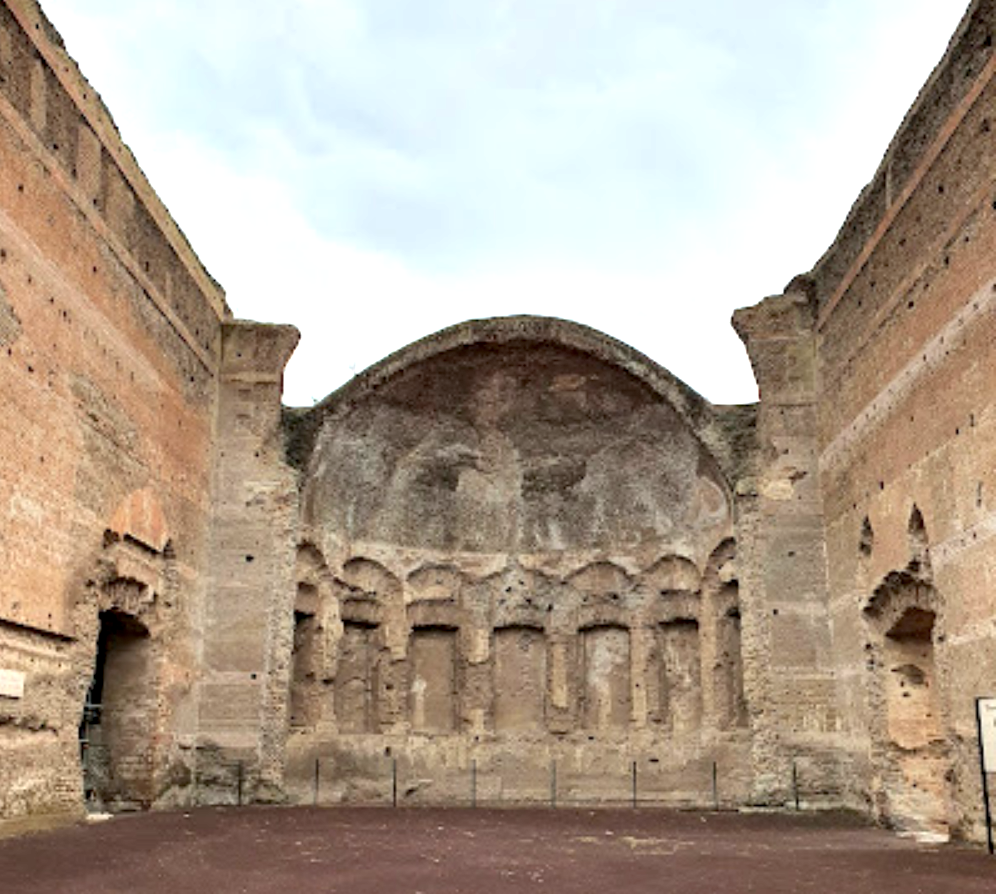
Hall of the Philosophers

The so-called Hall of Philosophers is a tall, monumental room situated between the Poecile and the Maritime Theatre, to both of which it has entrances with two staircases rising from the Poecile. Its main entrance is on the shorter northern side with four columns bearing a trabeation and on the south side is an hemispherically-domed apse with seven rectangular niches that probably contained large statues of either the seven philosophers, or the seven sages of Greece. The floor was paved in marble and the walls lined with alabaster, marble, and most of all red porphyry, the imperial stone.

It was probably a monumental reception hall or throne room for the emperor's official audiences and for meetings with the most important politicians.

=== Poecìle Complex and the Cento Camerelle ===
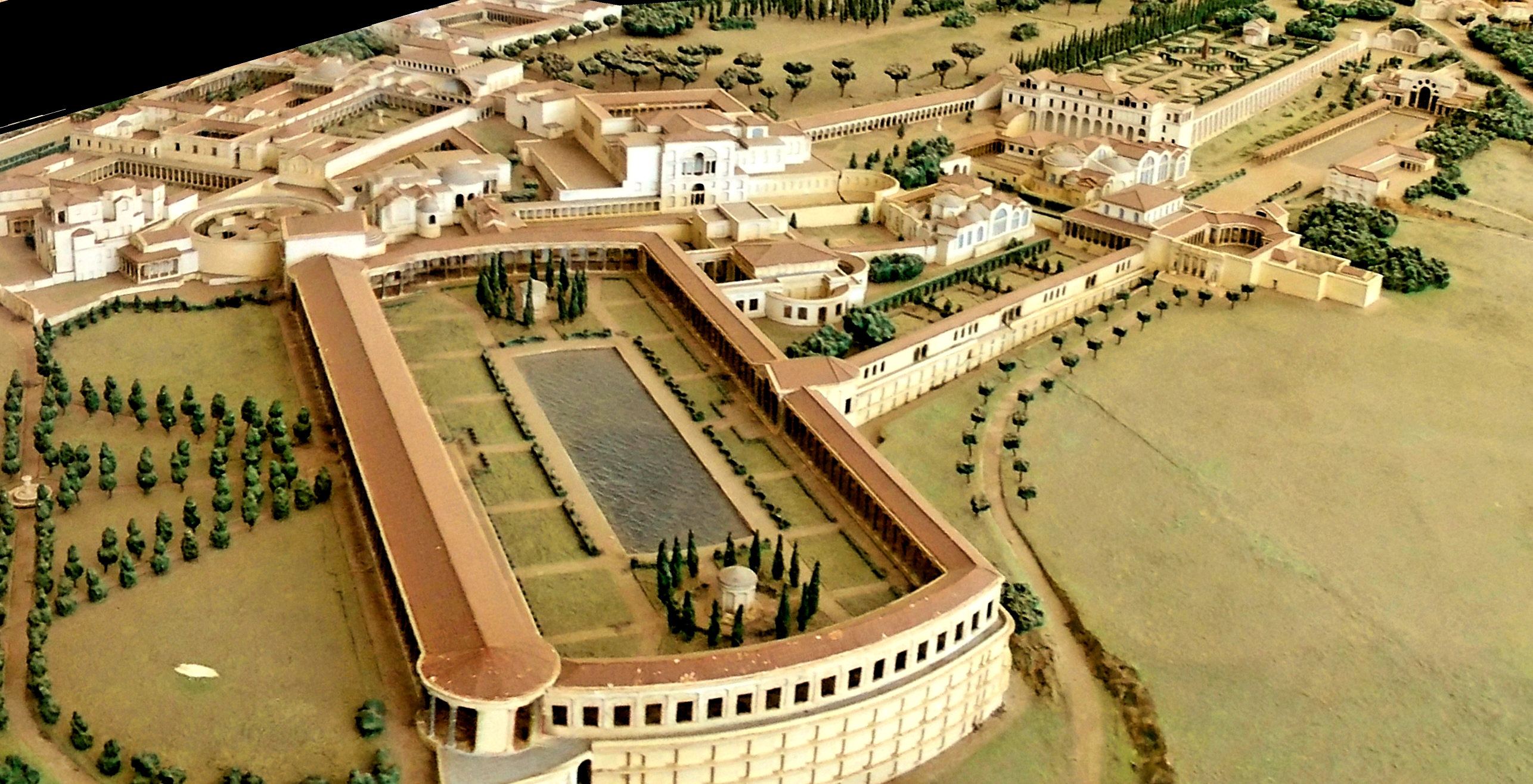
model of Poecìle

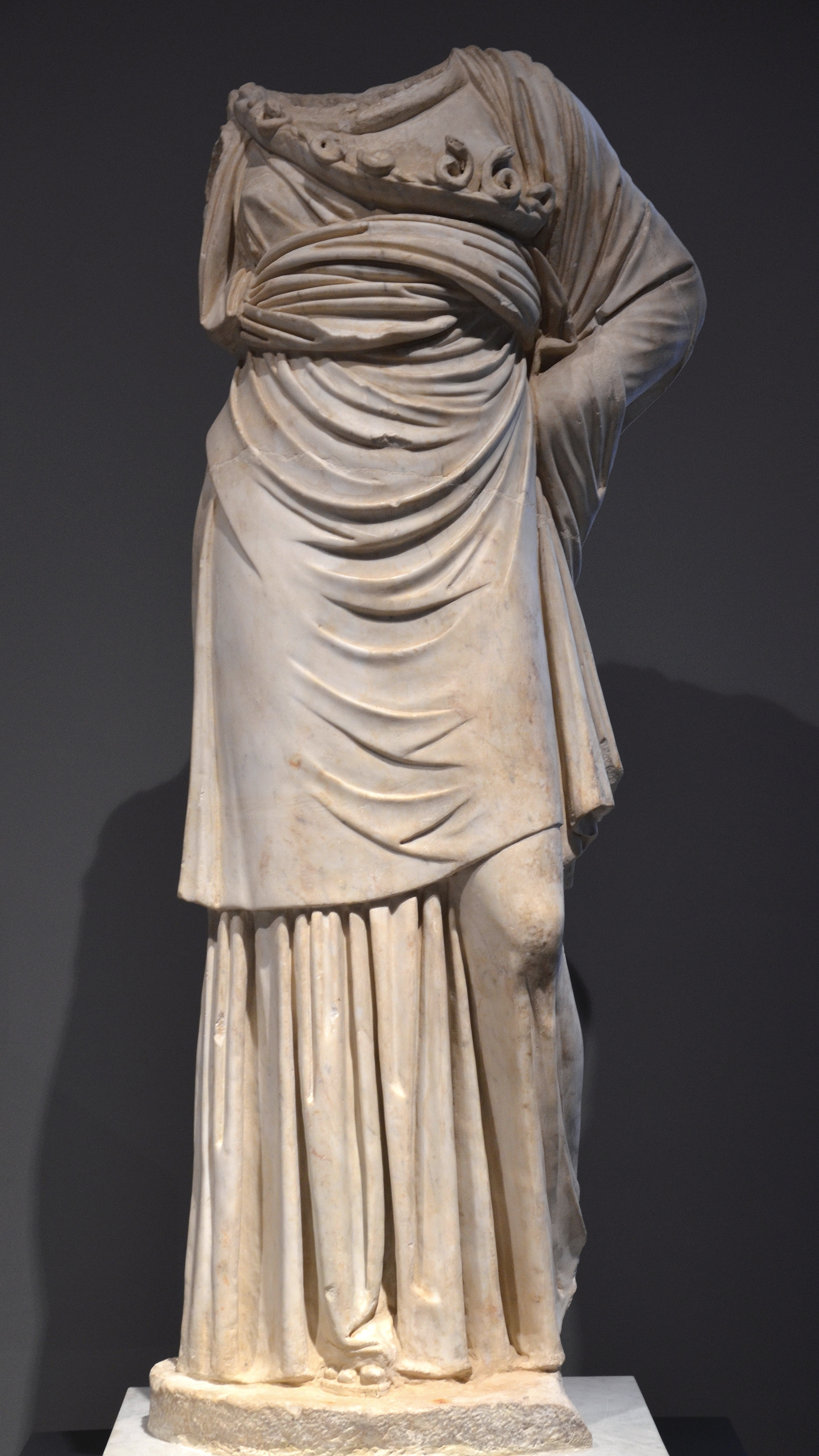
Athena of the Vescovali-Arezzo Type, from the Poecile (Palazzo Massimo alle Terme)

The Poecile was modelled on the Stoa Poikile in the agora of Athens, the political and cultural centre of the favourite city of Hadrian from his travels. The Poecile is a huge garden supported by mighty walls to raise its edges forming a high platform, on which is a large rectangular pool of 232 x 97 m surrounded by four walls with colonnaded interior. Large windows allowed a view of the panorama.

The northern part consisted of a double portico, or Xystus, of which the entire 9 m high central spine wall is preserved and where today in place of the columns that supported the roof, cylindrical shrubs have been planted. The portico allowed for walking or running in bad weather over a total distance of 430 m around the spine wall.

From the Poecile one could access, via stairs, the Hall of the Philosophers and the Maritime Theatre on one side, and the Building with Three Exedras, the Garden-Stadium and the Winter Palace on the other. The Poecile was intended to accommodate a large number of visitors or guests and belonged to the "public" quarters of the Villa.

The Poecile platform and esplanade were made possible by the construction of an enormous substructure, the Cento Camerelle ("100 rooms"), to overcome the difference in height of up to 15 m with the valley below along the south and west sides. It then continues for a long stretch to the Vestibule supporting another large terrace from the Building with Three Exedras to the Vestibule. As in most of the villa's substructures, it is made up of contiguous rooms of identical size separated by the vertical buttresses supporting the terrace, and with up to four floors. The rooms had wooden floors and a single opening at the front accessible from external wooden balconies, so as not to weaken the buttress walls by perforating them with doors, all connected by a brick staircase. The modesty of the wall and floor coverings, the number of rooms (to which the building owes its name) the many latrines and the fact that they were bordered by a paved road that entered the vestibule underground to give direct access to the servants' quarters of the baths, implies that these housed the humblest servants or slaves of the villa or perhaps the imperial guard. The rooms at street level, some of which have much lower ceilings, were possibly warehouses or stables and for housing carriages.

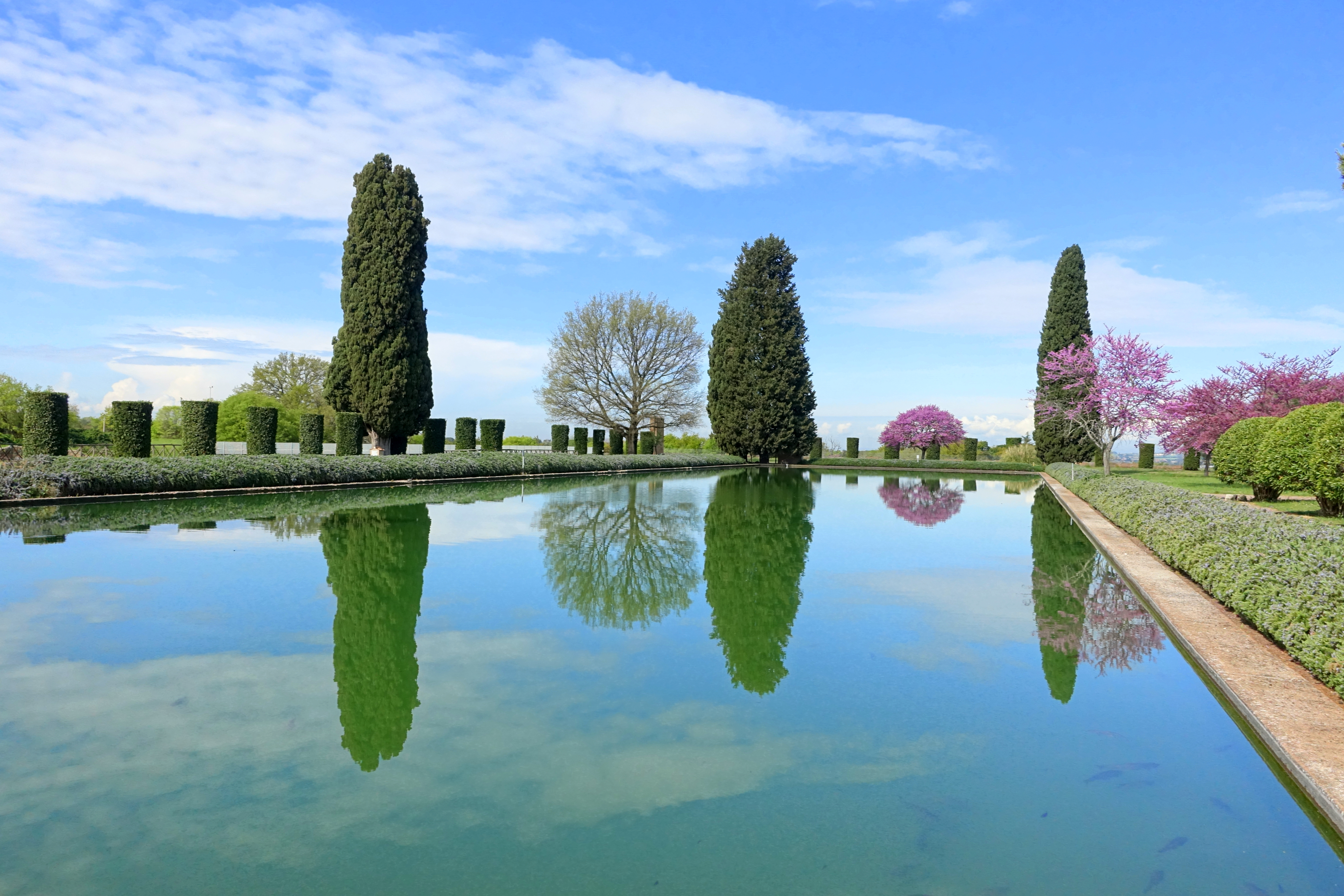
Poecile pool

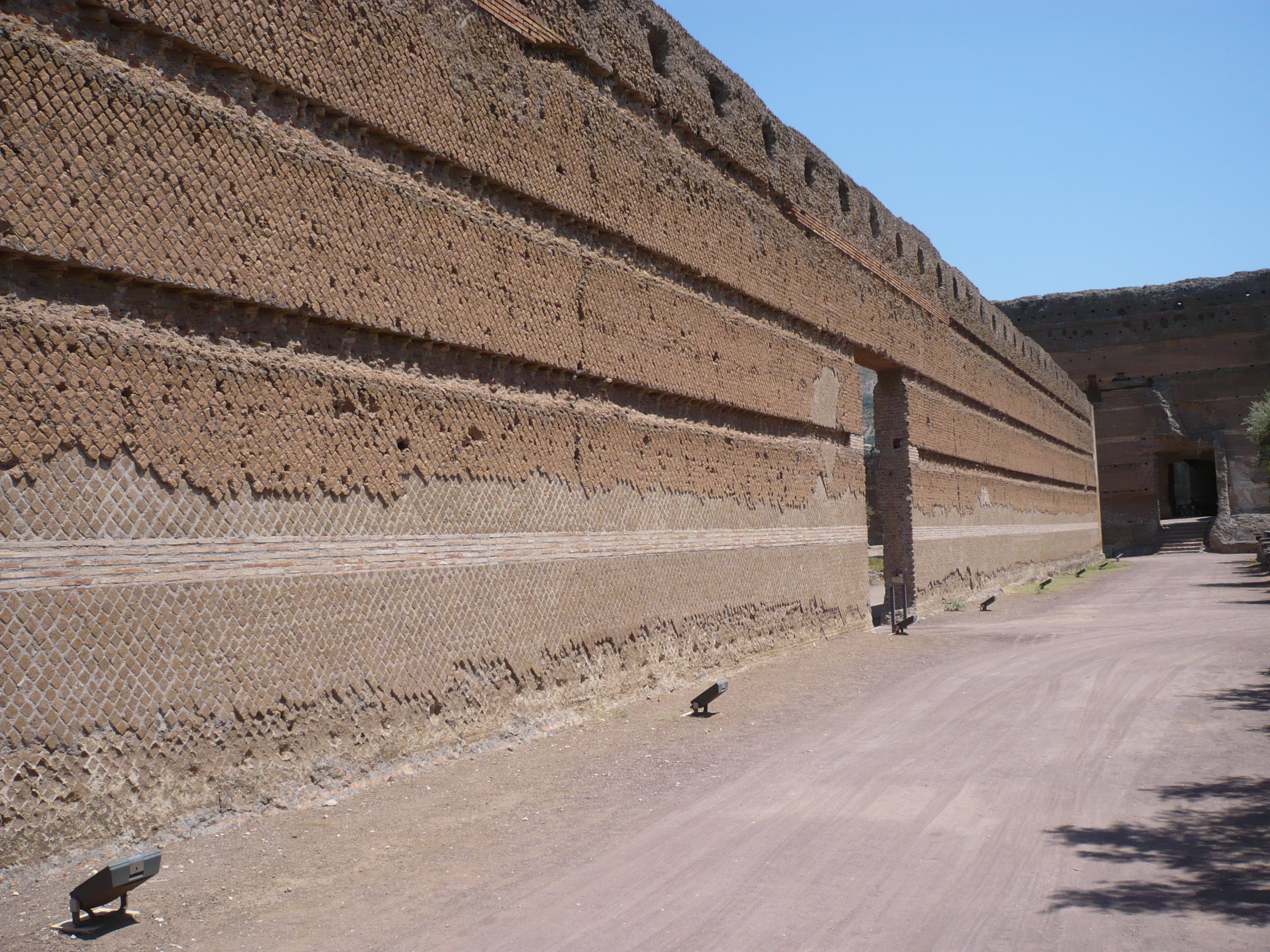
Northern spine wall of the Xystus

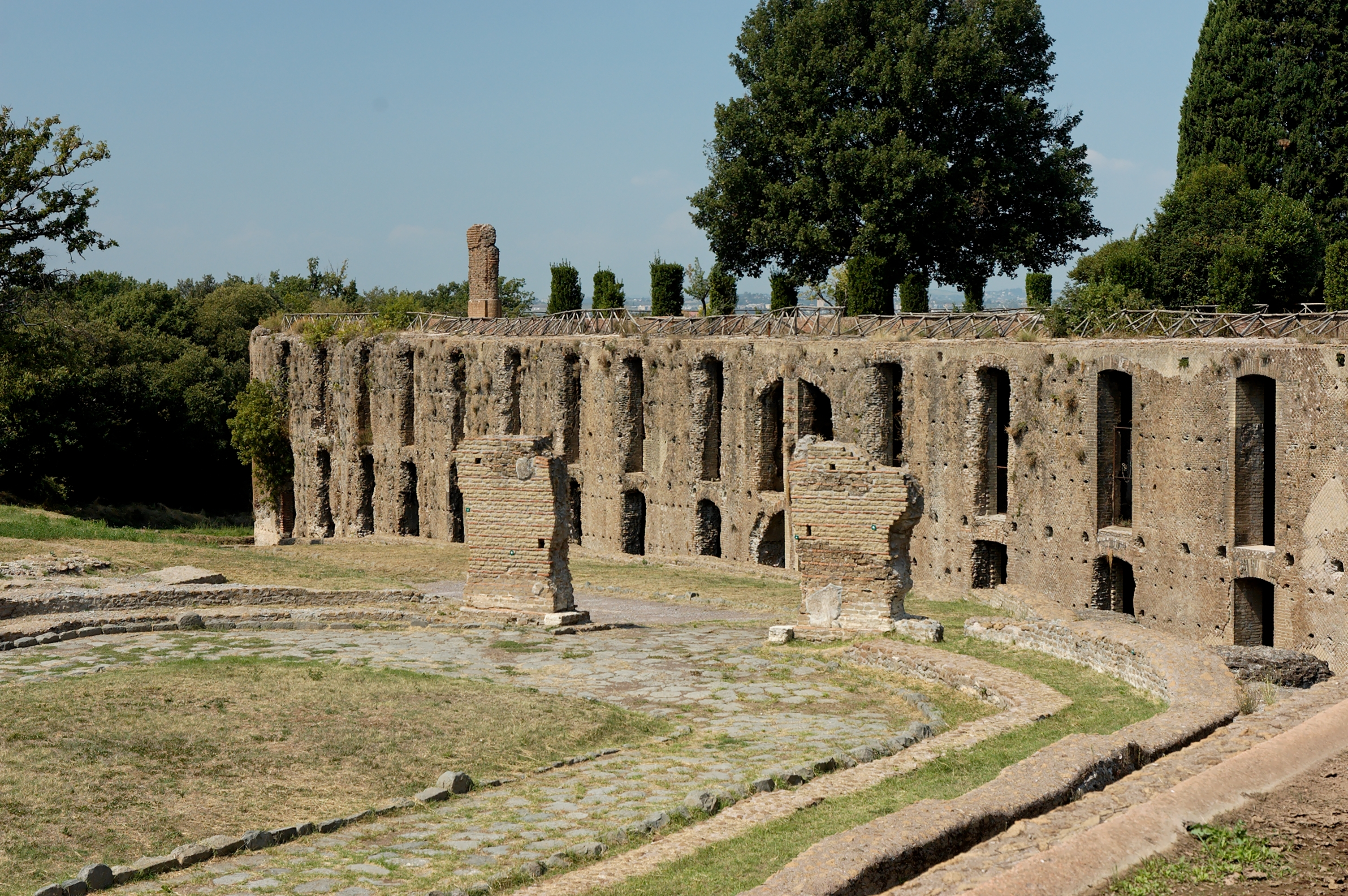
Cento Camerelle

=== Winter Palace/Garden-Stadium/3-Exedras Building Complex ===
==== Winter Palace ====
The Winter Palace (erroneously called the Fish-pond Building or Nympheum) and the 3-Exedras Building both face onto the Garden-Stadium, forming a 4-armed complex on the same alignment as the Poecile and joined to it. The complex was reserved as an Imperial residence as shown by the expensive decoration. The 3-Exedras Building acted as the atrium or entrance of this "villa" complex, the Garden Stadium was the inner garden and the Small Baths complete the ensemble.

The Winter Palace is on three levels and has a complex hypocaust system for heating the building especially in winter. It has refined marble flooring in many rooms. The ground floor is entered from the Garden-Stadium. The most striking part is the large 40-column courtyard (59 x 33.5 m) on the third level at the centre of which is a large, once white marble-clad, 28 m-long pool (erroneously called a fish pond) surrounded by a mosaic pavement and with several rooms, all with a view overlooking the Poecile. The portico was paved in opus sectile and the walls were marble-clad, traces of whose large rectangular panels can be seen. The pool was probably intended to create a play of light and reflections from the sheet of water. The basin's outward sides have alternating semi-circular and rectangular niches probably for statues. On the 2nd level beneath the courtyard portico floor is a cryptoporticus with four wings and lit by inclined windows, and used for walks in hot or poor weather. It was probably created during the second phase of the villa (125-133). A series of large monumental halls panelled in marble faced the Garden Stadium, with a main central hall. There are four small single latrines indicating their imperial status.

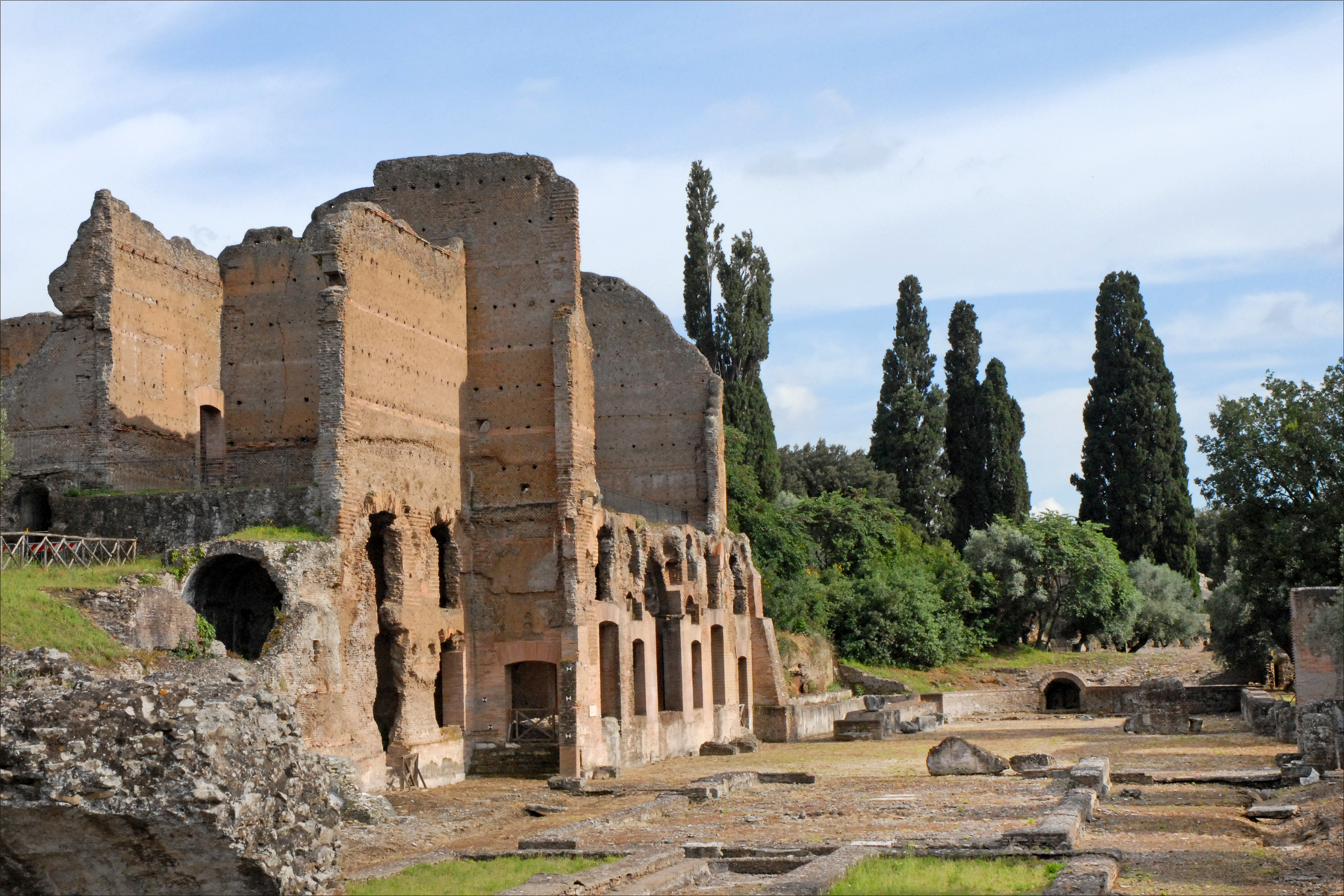
Winter Palace and Garden

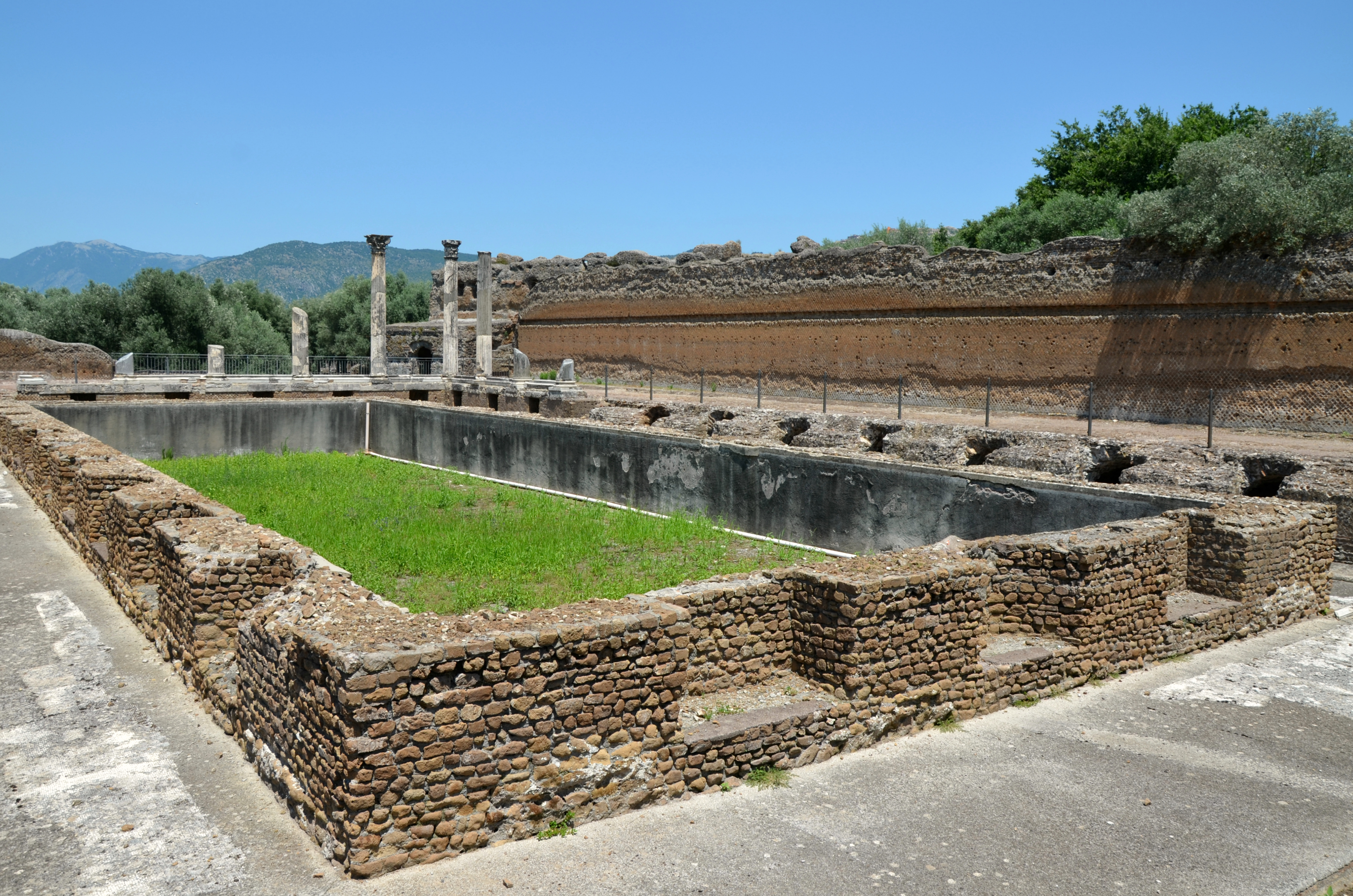
Pool of Winter Palace

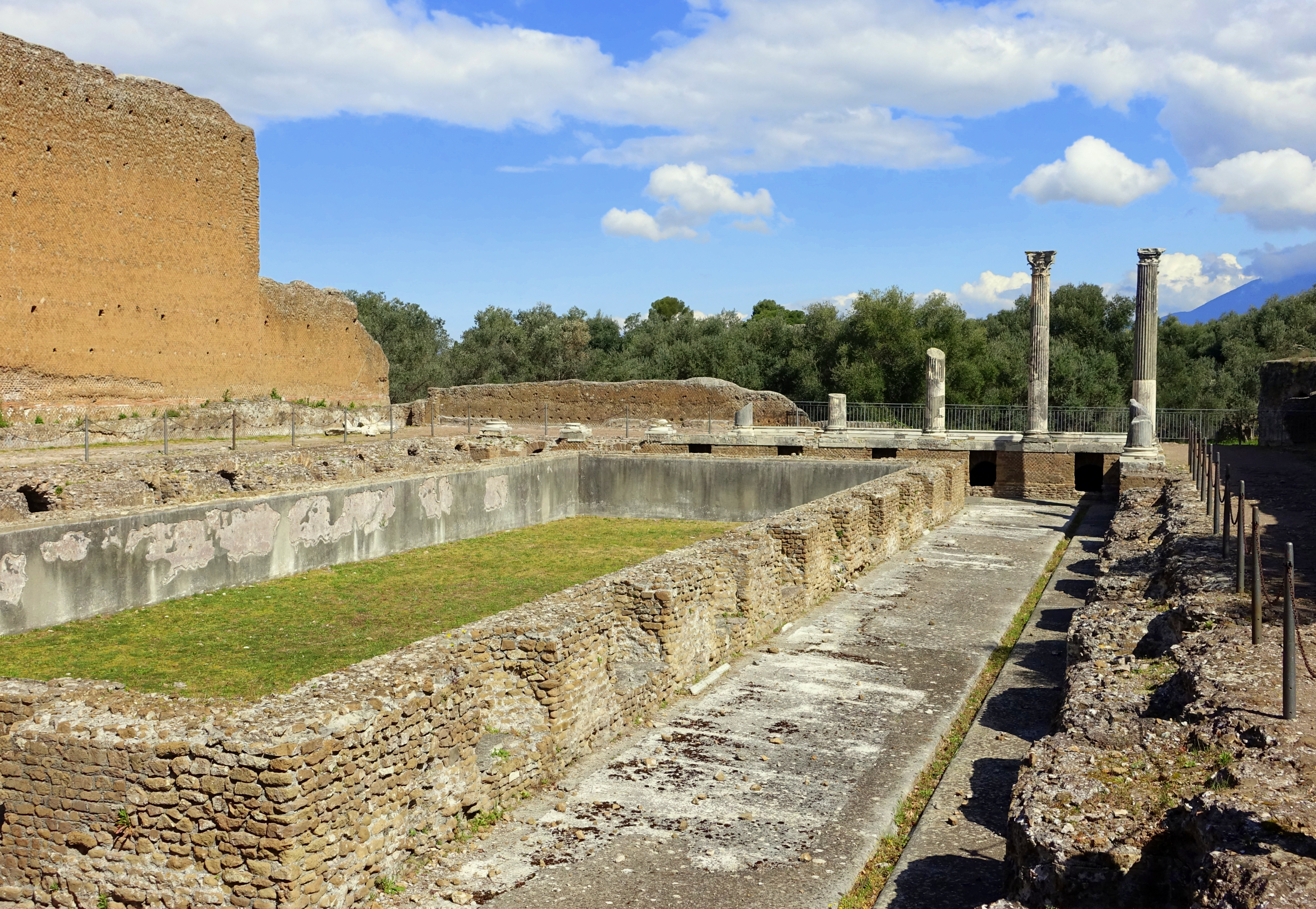

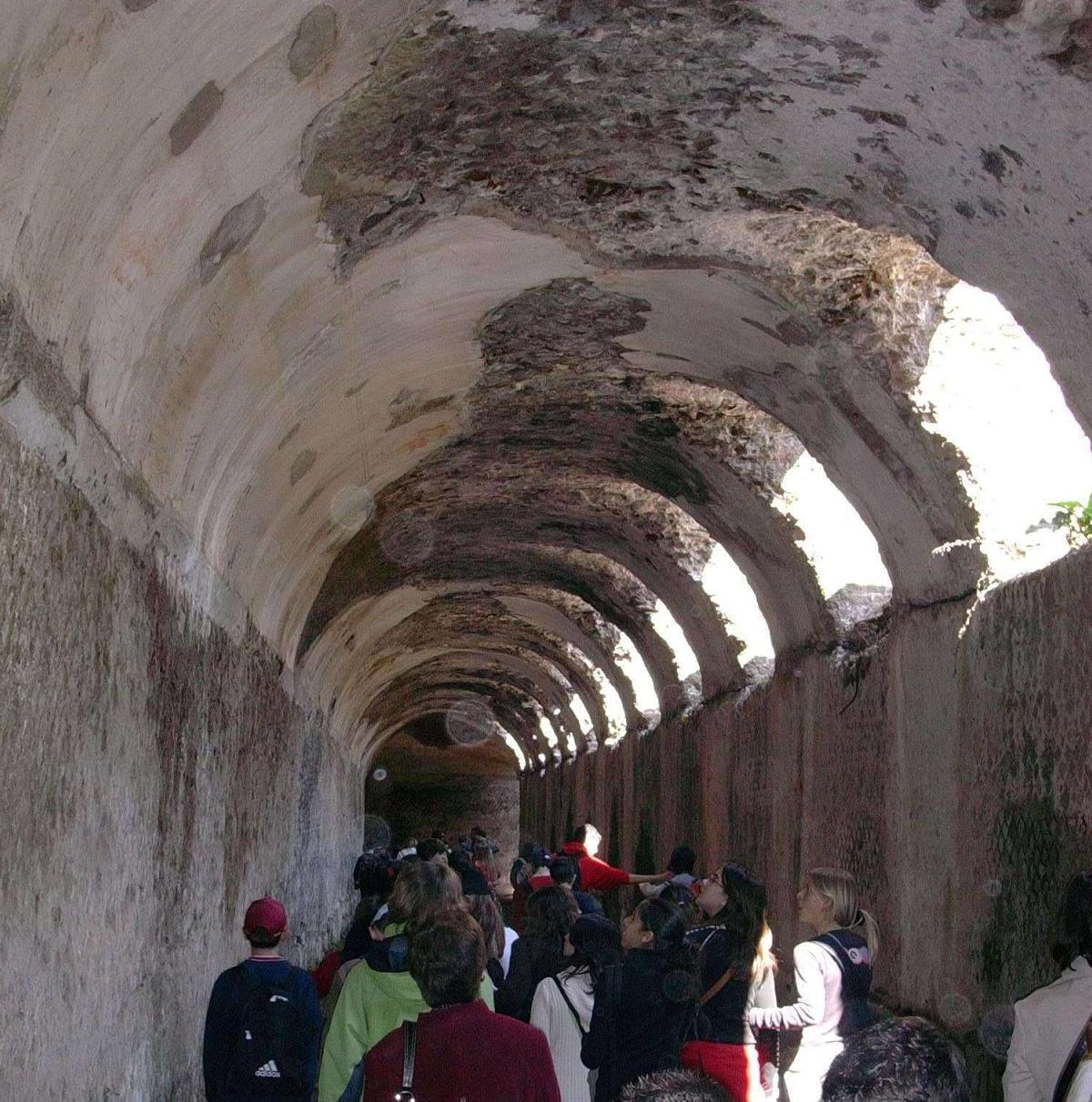
Cryptoporticus

==== Garden-Stadium ====
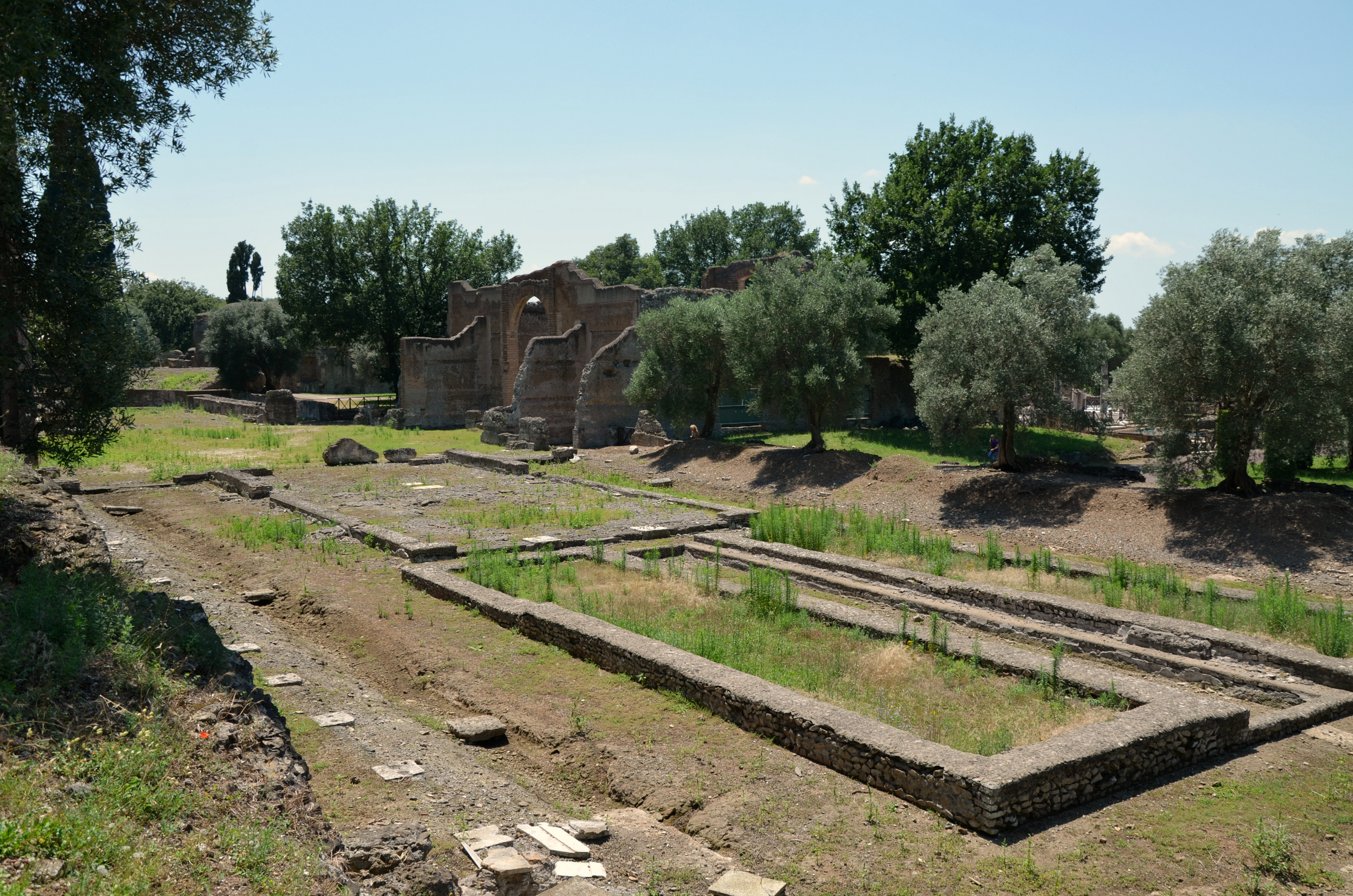
The Garden-Stadium

The Garden-Stadium is so-called because of its overall shape of a stadium for athletics, a design popular in large villas such as the Palatine palace, the Villa of the Quintilii etc.. It was built on one level by excavating the slopes of the hill on which the Baths with Heliocaminus stand and has three parts: the northern, central and southern parts. The northern part had a large exedra at the end with a niche at its centre. The side rooms had frescoes and coloured opus sectile floors and a door into the Maritime Theatre and the Poecile. It overlooked a peristyle garden with two pools. At the south end was a central pavilion with fountains and possibly sculptures.

The central part of the Garden-Stadium was a large garden with a peristyle connected to the adjacent buildings.

The southern part had a semicircular nymphaeum at the south end similar to that of the Imperial Palace, with walls resembling a grotto. Water flowed over steps in cascades and then into a system of pools and canals to a colonnaded pavilion at its north end which was a cool summer triclinium.

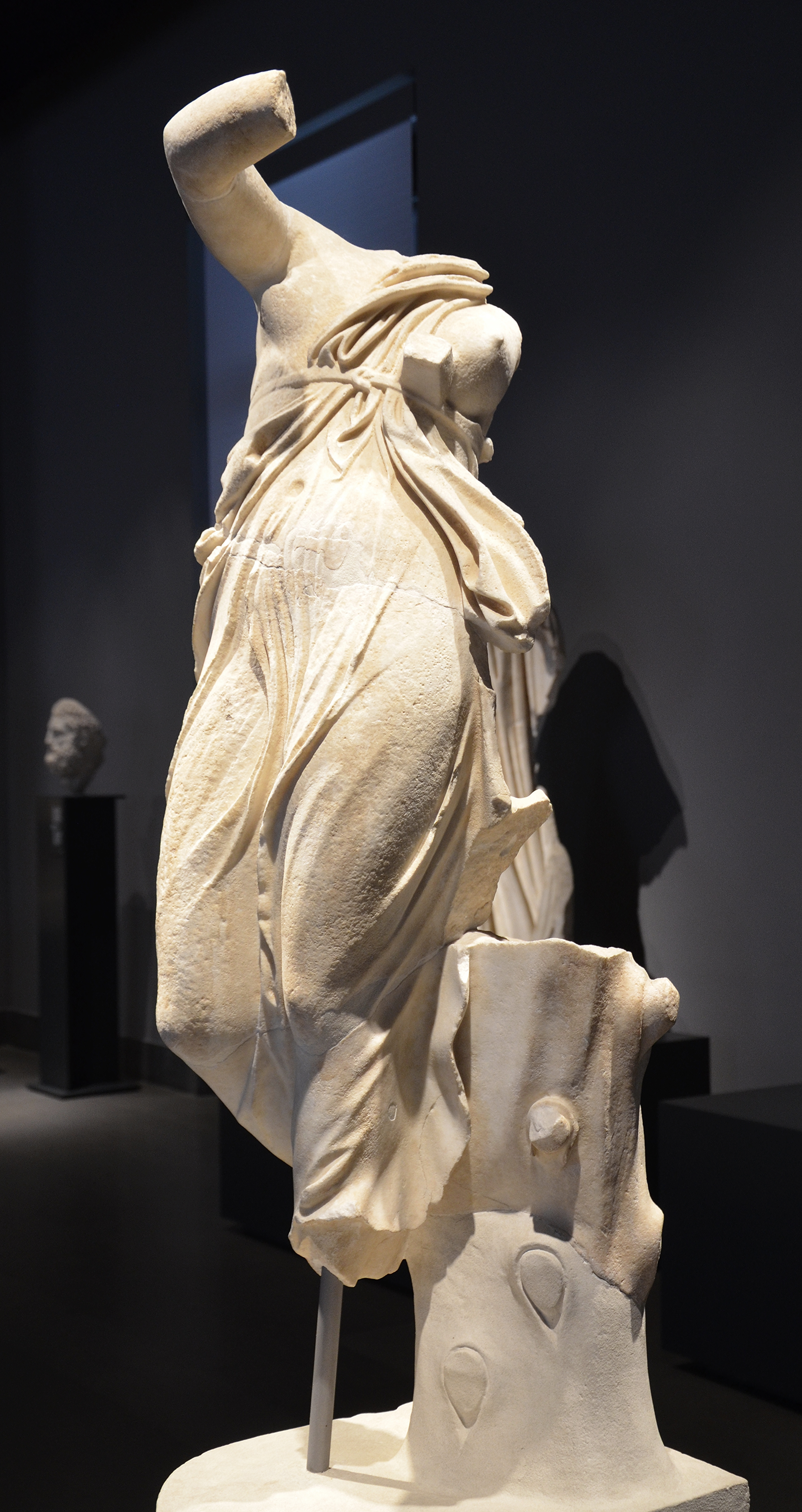
Praxilla from the portico (Palazzo Massimo alle Terme)

==== 3-Exedras Building ====
The vast basilical hall at the centre, paved in opus sectile and probably cross-vaulted, was surrounded on 3 sides with exedras that gave the building its name. The hall was richly decorated with marble slabs, some of which still survive, and adorned with columns of Cipollino and Pavonazzetto on precious white marble bases.

Facing the Poecile to the north of the main hall was the entrance hall to the whole Winter Palace complex, almost entirely dominated by a monumental rectangular fountain, surrounded by a series of statues positioned against the columns and flanked by two porticoed corridors. The usual function of the atrium was transformed into an impassable space occupied by the fountain while the entranceway was entrusted to the two side corridors. The other three sides of the hall to the west, south and east opened onto exedras with porticos, the southern one featuring octagonal fountains aligned with the windows on either side of a niche. Beyond the eastern exedra towards the Winter Palace were several rooms at the centre of which was the tablinum. All rooms were paved with beautiful polychrome marble opus sectile and had walls clad in marble.

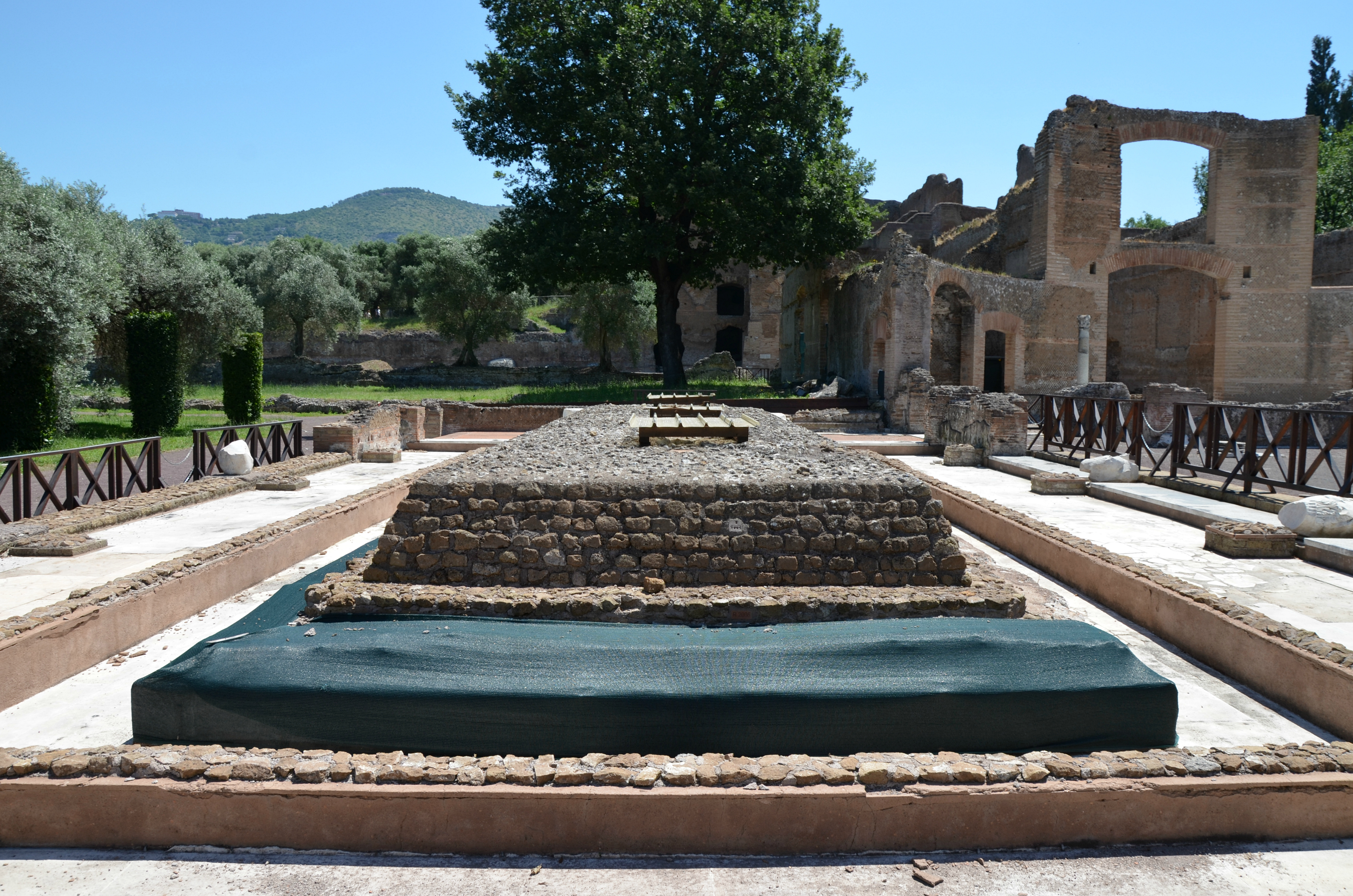
Northern entrance and monumental fountain

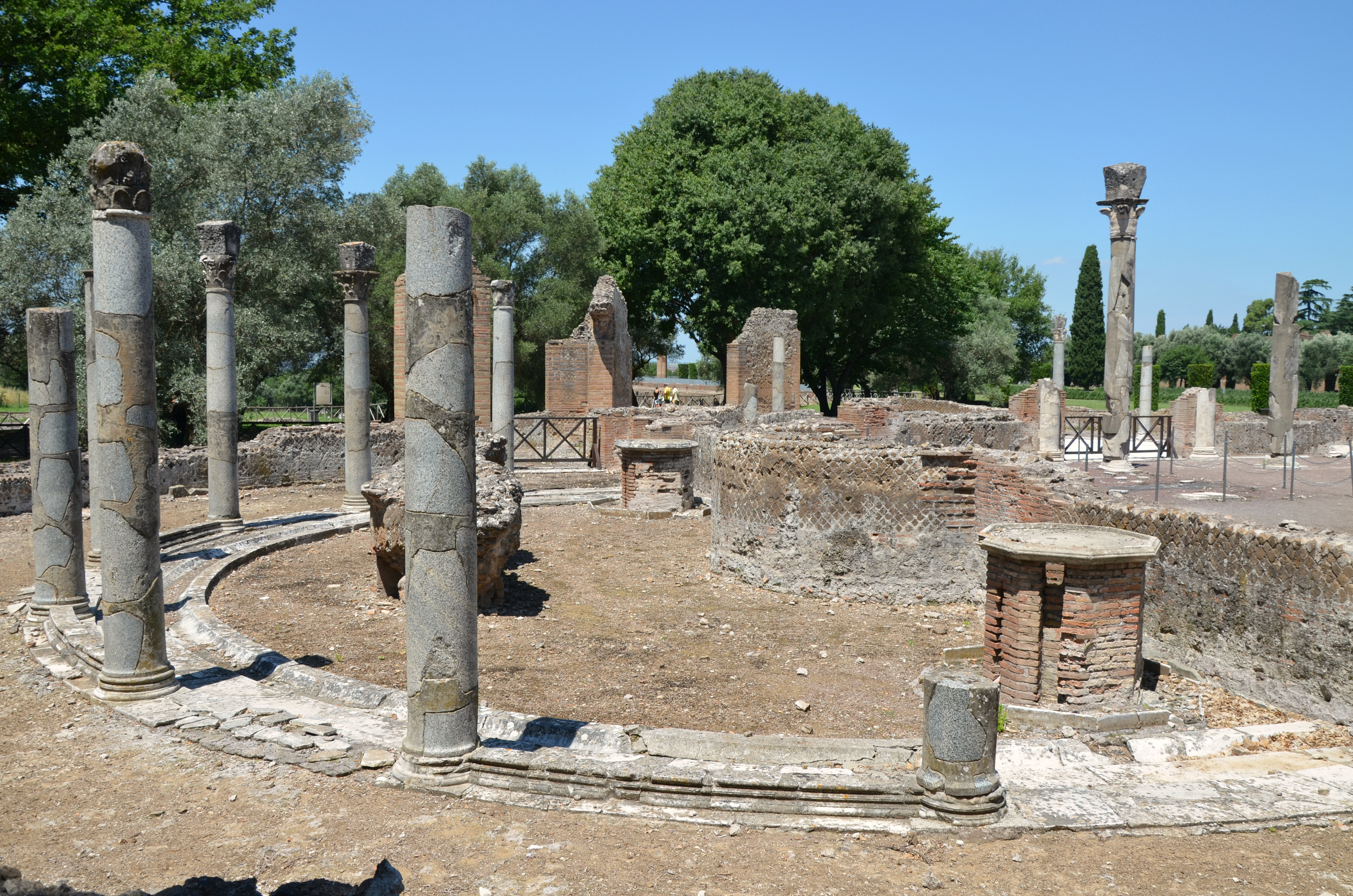
Southern exedra

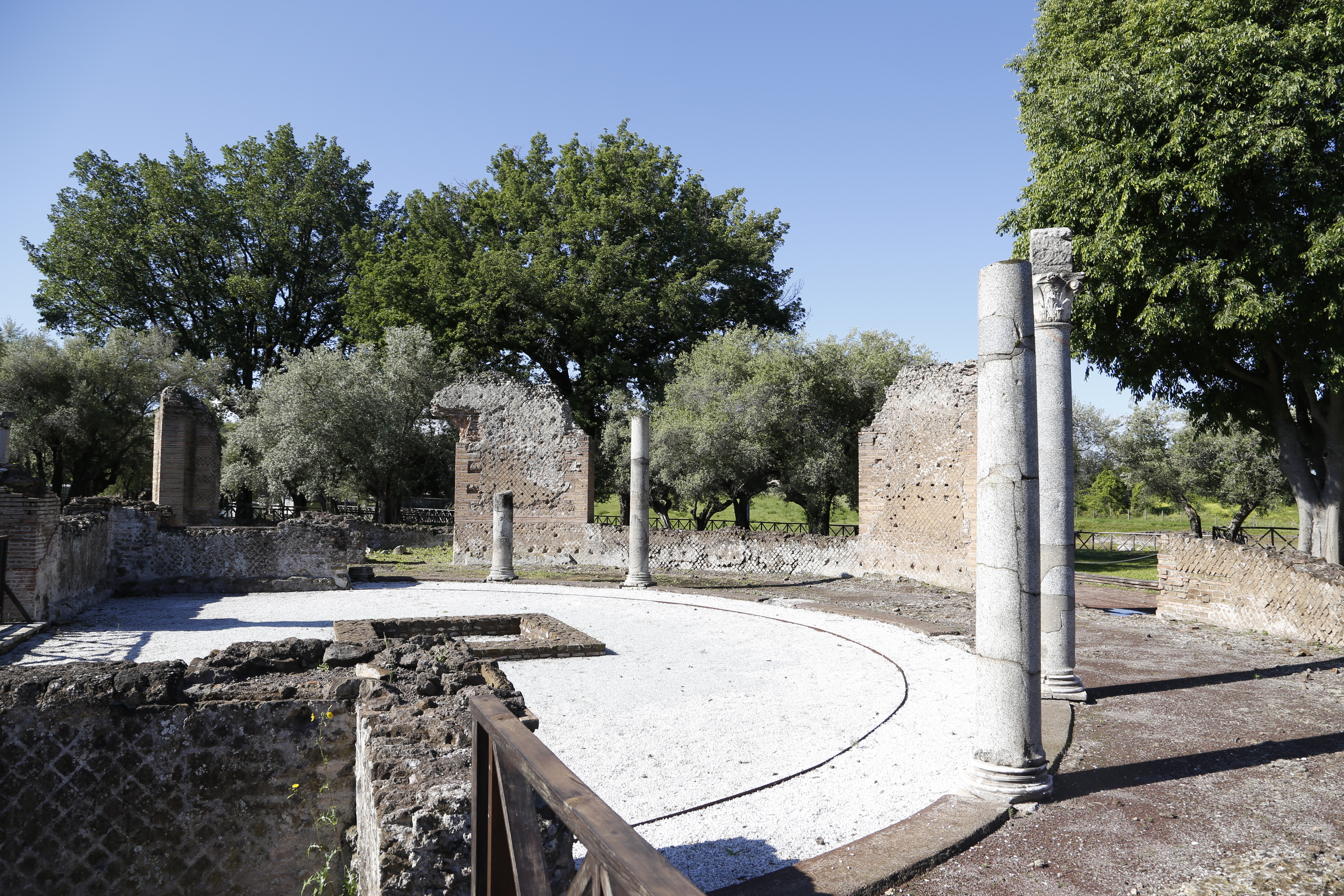
Western exedra

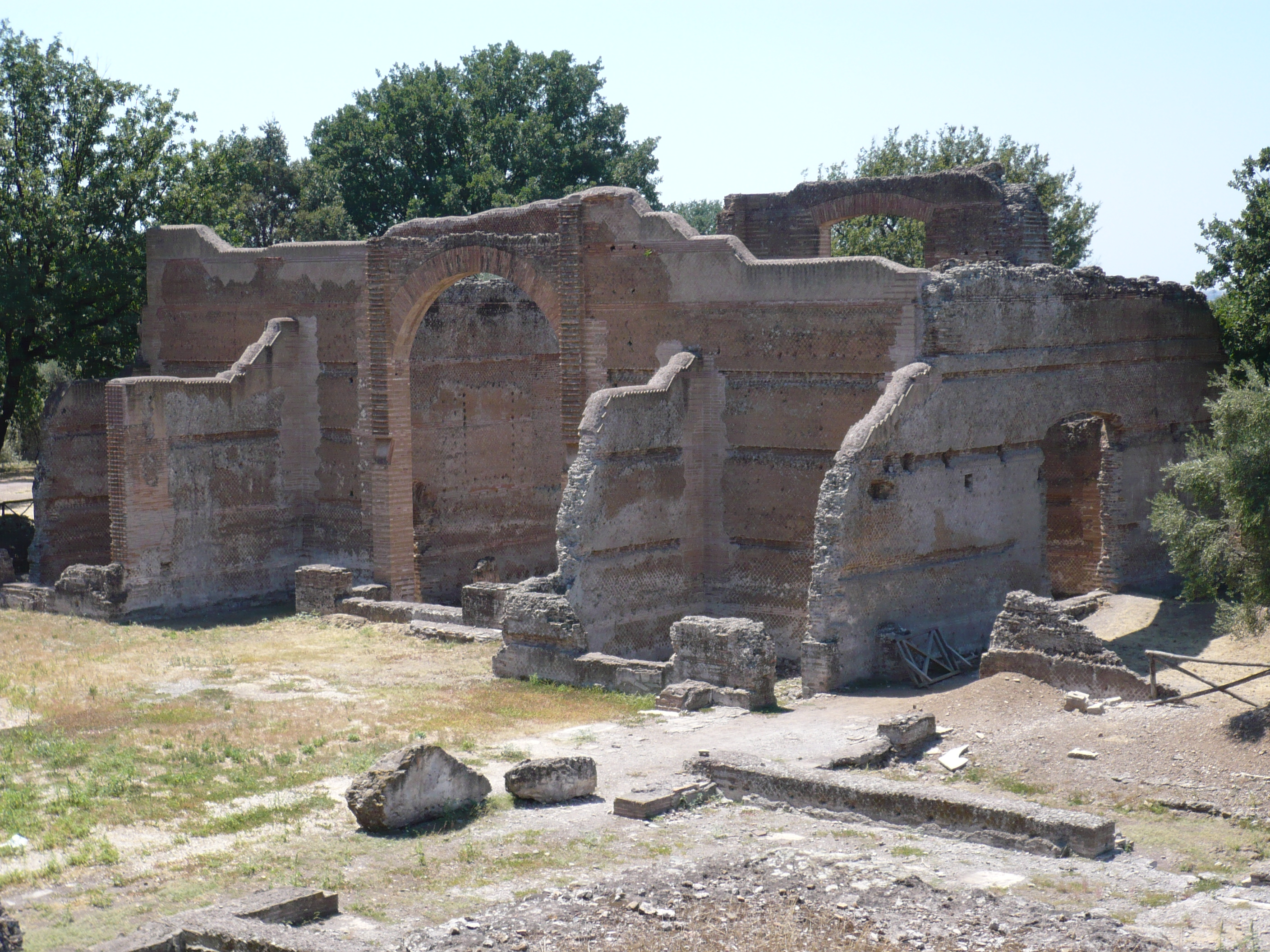
Eastern entrance

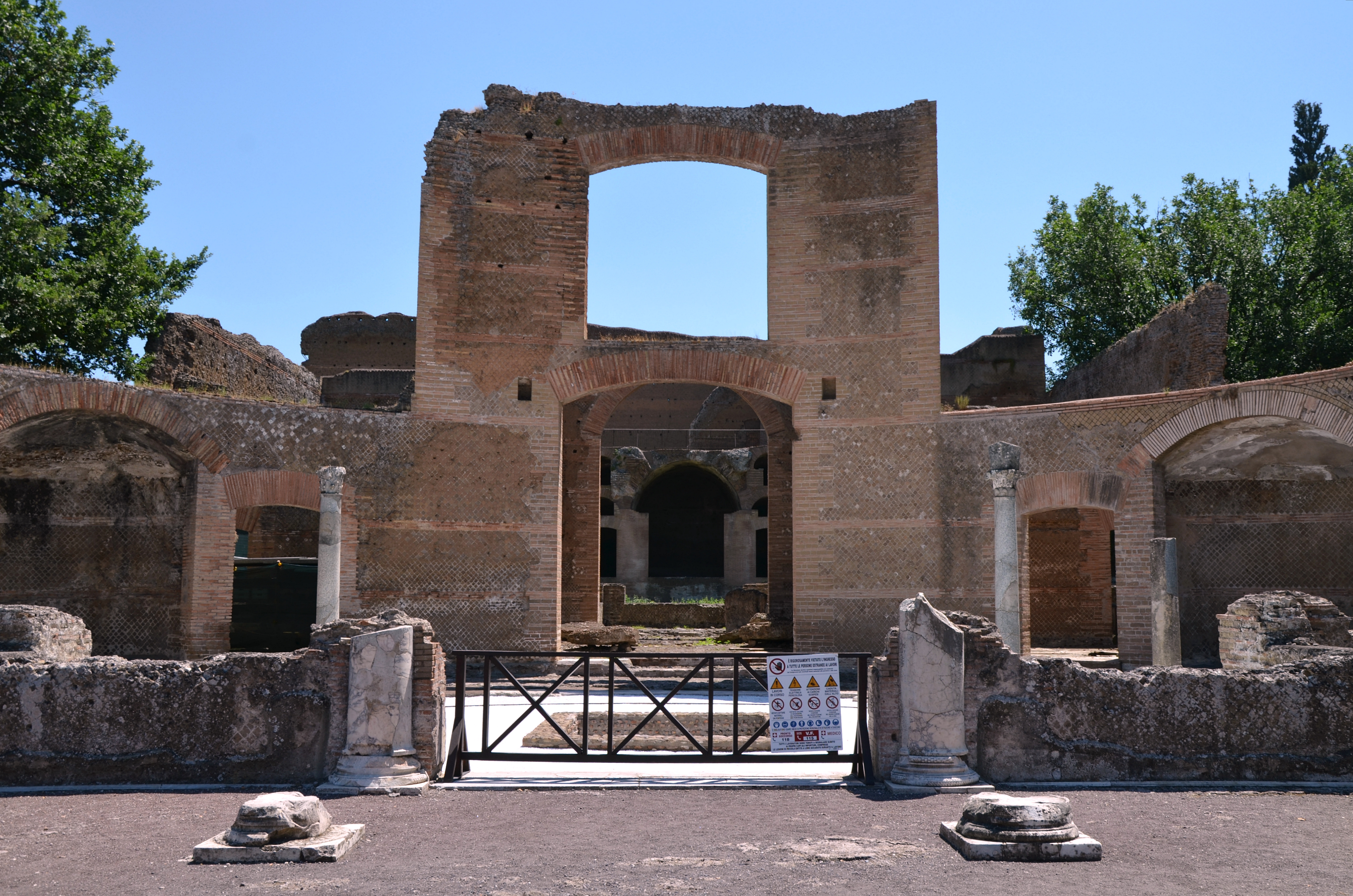
Eastern exedra

==== Quadriporticus ====
The Quadriporticus was a peristyle linking the rest of the Winter Palace complex with the Small Baths and the 3-Exedras Building. It had a central garden and marble-clad walls. The wall on the side of the Small Baths belongs to the earlier villa from the Republican or Augustan era and has a series of niches for statues.

=== The Antinoeion ===
In 1998 a new section of the villa, named by scholars the Antinoeion, was rediscovered. This area is located on the main road leading to the grand vestibule. The discovery of a large concrete foundation has been used as evidence of the original location of the Antinous Obelisk which is now located on the Pincian Hill in Rome. Some scholars have argued that this evidence is proof of Antinous’s tomb being located on the villa while others argue that the area was a highly Egyptianised nympheum. The Antinoeion is just one example of Egyptianisation of the villa. Artwork such as the crocodile of the Canopus and the statue of Osiris-Antinous show the prevalence of this orientalist aesthetic in the villa.

== Sculptures and artworks ==
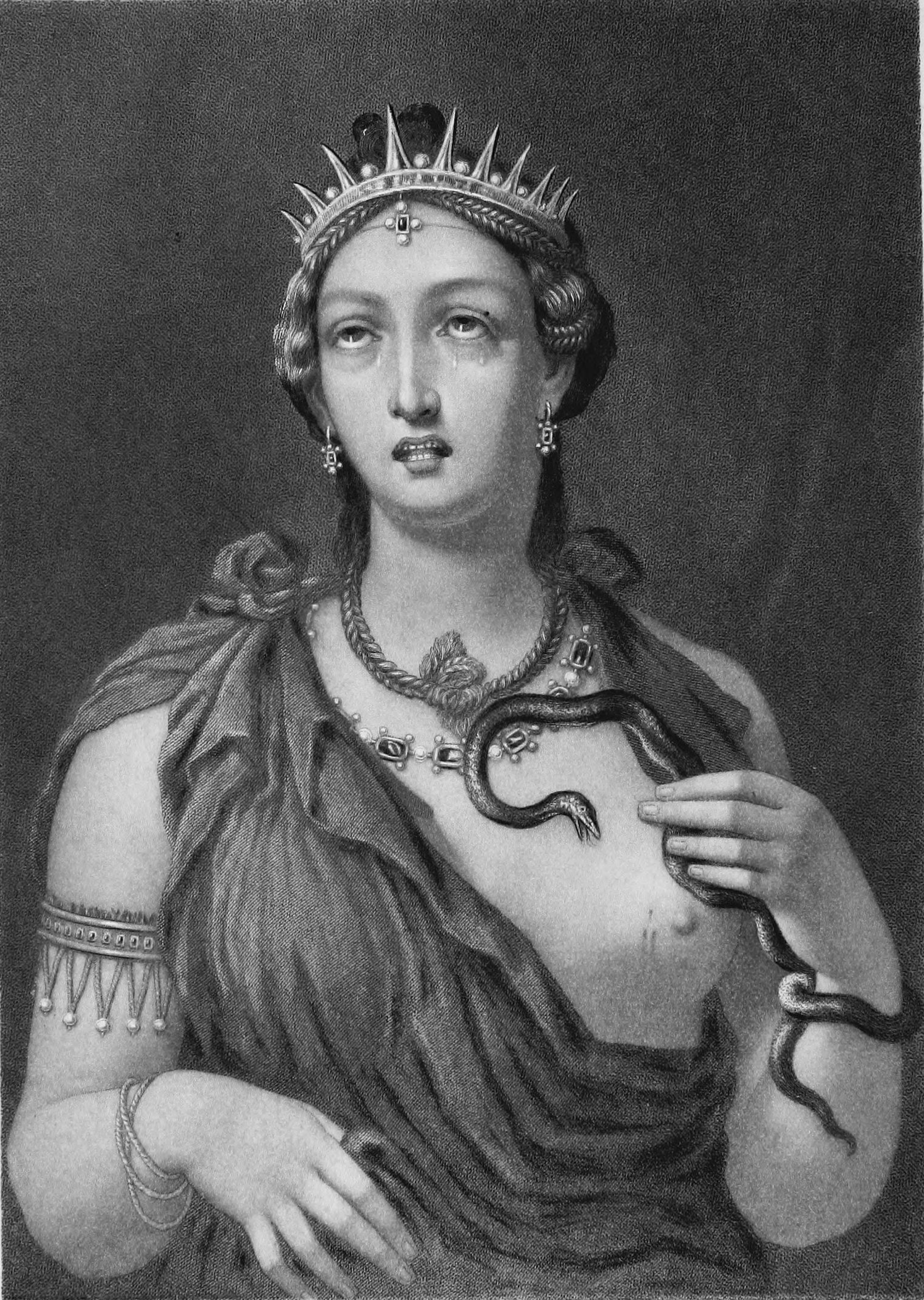
A steel engraving depicting Augustus' now lost painting of the death of Cleopatra VII in encaustic, which was discovered at Emperor Hadrian's Villa (near Tivoli, Italy) in 1818; she is seen here wearing the golden radiant crown of the Ptolemaic rulers, an Isis knot (corresponding to Plutarch's description of her wearing the robes of Isis), and being bitten by an asp in an act of suicide.

A lifelike mosaic depicted a group of doves around a bowl, with one drinking, seems to be a copy of a work by Sosus of Pergamon as described by Pliny the Elder. It has in turn been widely copied. Artworks found in the villa include:

- Statue of Osiris-Antinous, Vatican Museum
- Discobolus
- Dove Basin mosaic, copy of a famous Hellenistic mosaic, Capitoline Museums
- Diana of Versailles, Louvre
- Crouching Venus
- Capitoline Antinous
- Young Centaur and Old Centaur (Capitoline versions)

== Significance ==
The United Nations Educational, Scientific and Cultural Organization (UNESCO) designated Hadrian's Villa as a World Heritage Site in 1999. The designation specified the boundaries of the site and created a buffer zone around it in which no new construction was permitted. In 2011, the communal government of Tivoli announced plans, later cancelled, to build a waste dump in the vicinity of the villa and approved the construction of public housing on 120,000 sq. meters within the buffer zone. At its 36th Annual Meeting, UNESCO formally addressed these encroachments on the site. While they commended the Italian government for its decision to abandon the construction of a waste dump in the Corcolle area, the committee requested the government "to inform the World Heritage Centre in due time about any major development project planned in the buffer zone of the property, including the housing development at Comprensorio di Ponte Lucano, for which a Heritage Impact Assessment should be included, in accordance with Paragraph 172 of the Operational Guidelines, before any irreversible commitment is made." UNESCO also requested "the State Party to submit . . . an updated report on the state of conservation of the property," by February 2014, reflecting concerns over the deterioration of the exposed ruins.

The reasons for making the villa a World Heritage Site are: it is a masterpiece that brings together the material culture of the Mediterranean world, it inspired the Renaissance and baroque period, it inspires the modern world as well, and the villa is an exceptional survival of the early Roman Empire.

In 2019, UNESCO designated Hadrian's Villa as a site with special immunity from wartime activity due to its profound symbolic value. In 2021 February, archaeologists led by researcher Rafael Hidalgo Prieto from the Pablo de Olavide University announced the discovery of remains of Hadrian's breakfast room which used to show his imperial power. They revealed a structure as a water triclinium and a separate dining room that served as a model for the well-known Serapeum.

"The emperor wanted to show things that would overwhelm the visitor, something that had not been seen anywhere else in the world and that exists only in Villa Adriana" said Prieto.

== Gallery ==
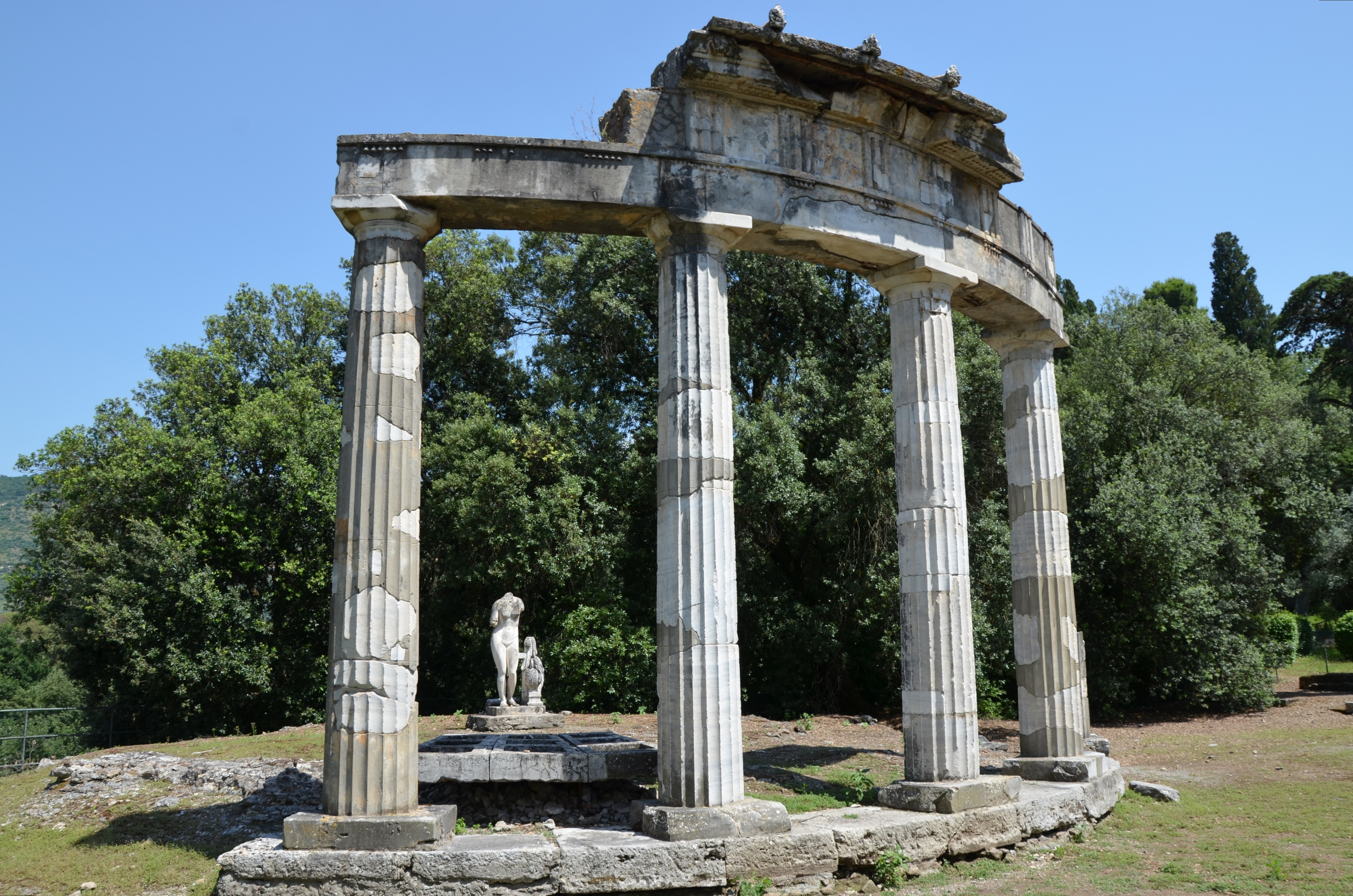
The Temple of Venus

"Battle of Centaurs and Wild Beasts" mosaic was made for the dining room of Hadrian's Villa (120–130 AD). Altes Museum Berlin, Germany

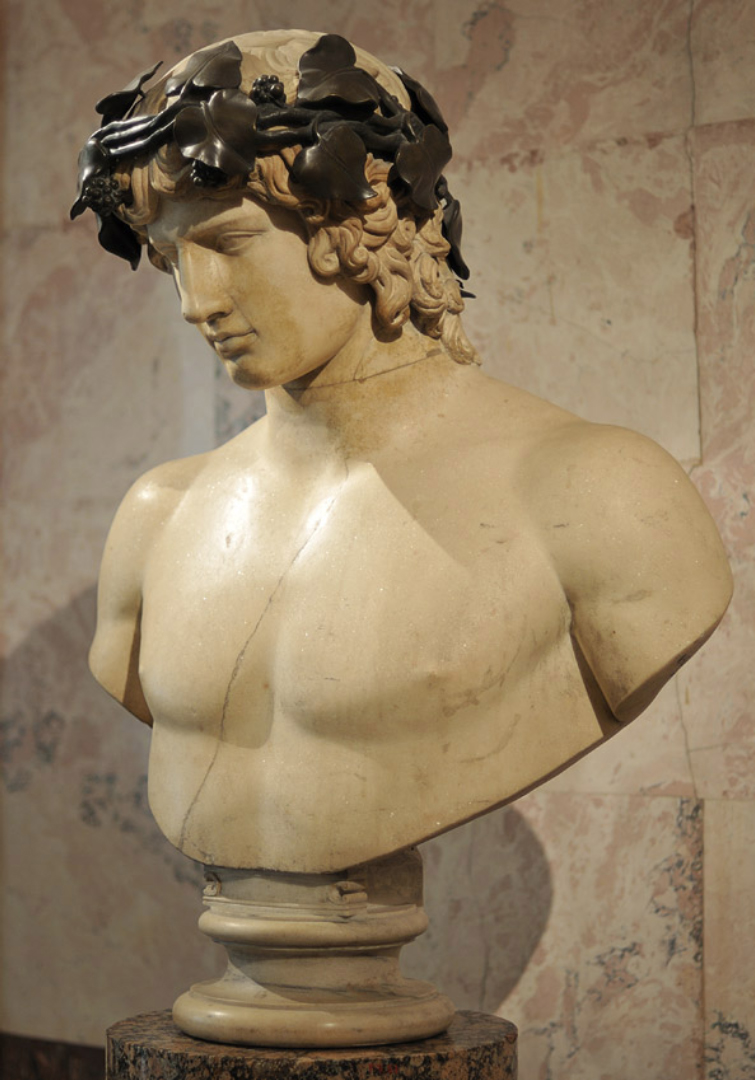
Bust of Antinous Hermitage Museum

== See also ==
- List of Roman domes
- Ancient Roman and Byzantine domes
- Villa Romana del Casale ruins of a Roman senators villa
