= Cipollino marble =

Variety of marble

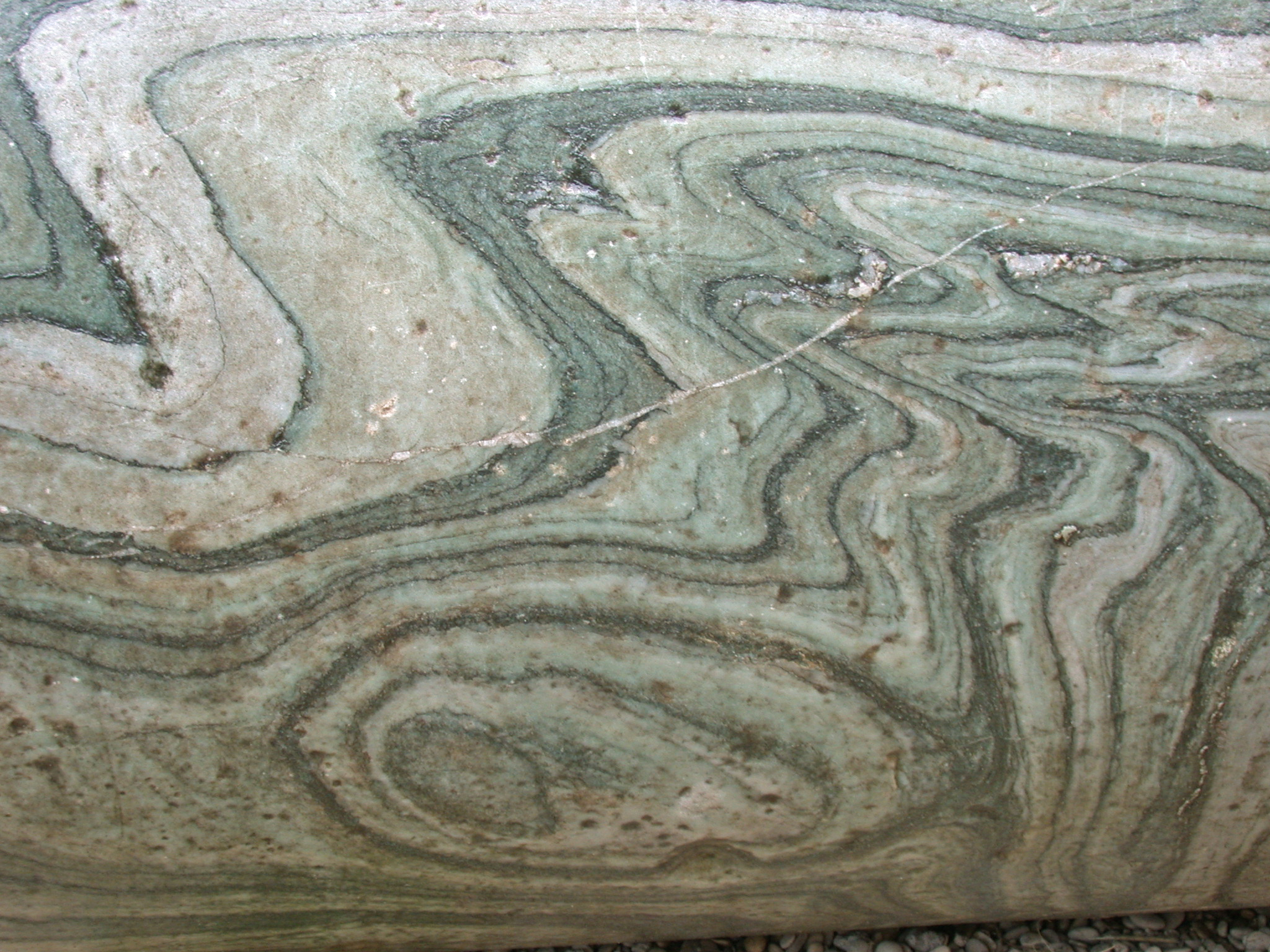
A cipollino marble column in the Basilica of Maxentius in Rome

Cipollino marble (is meant: "onion-stone"), also known as Karystian marble, is a variety of silicate marble. It was used by the ancient Greeks and Romans, whose Latin term for it was marmor carystium (meaning "marble from Karystos"). It was quarried in several locations on the south-west coast of the Greek island of Euboea, between the modern-day cities of Styra and Karystos. Some of these ancient quarries survive with a mine-face of over 100 metres.

It has a white-green base, with thick wavy green bands, constrained by thin bands of mica. The colour of its base and grain grows darker the further north the location of the quarry. It is a metamorphic rock, a marble with crystals between 0.2 and 0.6 mm, with coloured veins of epidote and chlorite. A marble similar in appearance was mined in the Iberian peninsula at the Anasol mines, and on the Alpi Apuane, in north-west Greece and modern day Serbia.

First used in ancient Greece, it was exported to Rome from the 1st century BC onwards. In his Natural History, Pliny the Elder writes how columns of this marble were used in the home of the eques Claudius Mamurra, who had been an engineer for Julius Caesar in his Gallic Wars. The quarries from Karystos yielding it became imperial property in 17 AD, and cipollino marble became common throughout Rome during the imperial period. It was principally used for column shafts, including large and mainly smooth ones, such as the columns of the pronaos of the temple of Antoninus and Faustina in the Forum in Rome. It was also used for sculpture, such as that of a crocodile in the Canopus at the Villa Adriana at Tivoli, where its colour was used to imitate the colour of crocodile skin. The marble was also used for the Basilica Aemilia, for the Domus Augustana, for the Villa Gordiani, for the forum of Augustus, the forum of Vespasian, the forum of Domitian, the forum of Trajan, and for the reconstruction of the Temple of Zeus in Cyrene between 172-175, before the marble quarries were closed by Septimius Severus in 206.

The quarries were later reused in the Byzantine period for the Basilica of Gaza in the 4th century, for the Church of Saint Demetrius in 412, for the Basillica of Saint Apollinare in Ravenna in 504, for the reconstruction of the Hagia Sophia in 537 and the Church of the Holy Apostles in 546, for the Monastery of Saint Loukas between 920-945, for the Westminster Abbey in London in the middle of the 11th century, and for Saint Mark's Basilica in Venice in 1094.

== See also ==
- List of types of marble

== Sources ==
- Papamichael, Stamatis (2002). Post-Christian Karystos (in Greek). Ε & Π ΤΑΜΒΑΚΟΣ Ο.Ε. ISBN 960-90995-1-3.
