= Mamurra =

Roman military officer (fl. 1st century BC)

- Known for: Officer of Julius Caesar

Mamurra (fl. 1st century BC) was a Roman military officer who served under Julius Caesar.

== Biography ==
=== Early life ===
Possibly named Marcus Vitruvius Mamurra (if we follow Thielscher's 1969 suggestion based on an inscription in Thibilis), he was an equestrian who originally came from the Italian city of Formiae. His family must have been prominent there, as Horace calls it "the city of the Mamurrae".

An inscription in Verona, which names a Lucius Vitruvius Cordo, and an inscription from Thilbilis in North Africa, which names a Marcus Vitruvius Mamurra have been suggested as evidence that the architect Vitruvius and this Mamurra were from the same family; or were even the same individual. Neither association, however, is borne out by De Architectura (which Vitruvius dedicated to Augustus), nor by the little that is known of Mamurra.

=== Military career ===
He served as praefectus fabrum (prefect of engineers) under Caesar in Gaul, although Caesar does not mention him. Earlier he had served under Pompey in the Third Mithridatic War (66–63 BC), then under Julius Caesar in Spain (61 BC). Catullus's poem 29 also refers to his service in Britain. Among the engineering feats achieved by Caesar's army during this time, which Mamurra may have been a part of, include the rapid construction of a bridge over the Rhine in 55 BC, the designing and building of a new kind of ship for the second expedition to Britain in 54 BC, and the double circumvallation of Alesia in 52 BC.

=== Lifestyle ===
Mamurra's military service, and his patronage by Caesar, made him extremely rich. According to Cornelius Nepos (quoted by Pliny the Elder) he was the first Roman to have his entire house, which sat on the Caelian Hill, clad in Karystian marble, and the first to use solid marble columns.

His large villa-estate of Gianola is traditionally that which can still be seen near Formia. It includes the cisterns of ‘Maggiore’ and of ‘36 columns’, aqueducts, a cryptoporticus and thermal baths. At the centre of the villa at the highest point of the promontory was a grandiose octagonal building also known as the Temple of Janus, which was flanked by two wings and two porticos sloping down towards the sea. Nearby at Porticciolo Romano are the remains of its fishponds. Five busts of male heads dating from the 2nd/3rd century AD have recently been excavated.

=== Character ===
Catullus constructed the character of Mamurra as a foil to himself, that is, as standing for all things un-Roman, and unlike Catullus himself. Catullus attacked Mamurra's profligacy, womanising and scandalous lifestyle, nicknaming him "mentula" (a vulgar word for the penis) and accusing him in a scurrilous poem of having a homosexual relationship with Caesar. This was regarded as a "lasting stain" on Caesar's character, but Catullus later apologised, and was immediately invited to dinner by Caesar. Catullus also refers in unflattering terms to Ameana, the mistress of "the bankrupt of Formiae", usually taken to mean Mamurra.

=== Later ===
A letter of Cicero of 45 BC refers to Caesar giving no visible reaction when he heard news of Mamurra, which has been interpreted by some as referring to his death, although the reference is too ambiguous to be certain.

== See also ==
- Homosexuality in ancient Rome
