= Formia =

City in Lazio, Italy

- Comune
- Comune di Formia
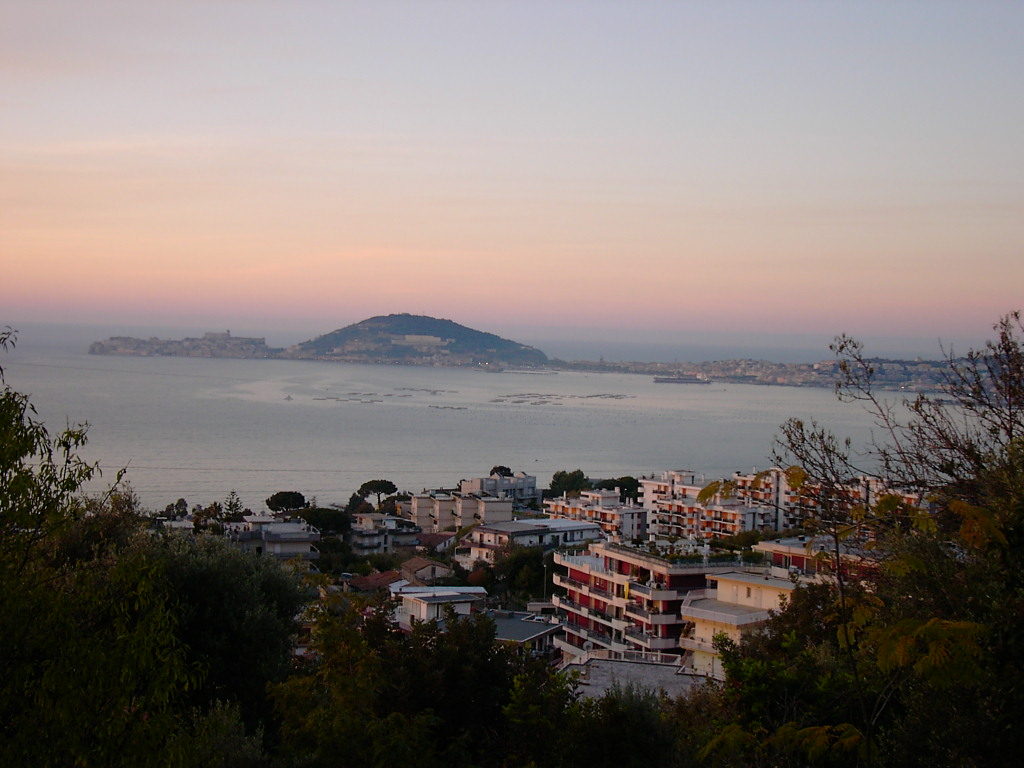

- Location within Italy Location within Lazio
- Coordinates: 41°16′N 13°37′E
- Country: Italy
- Region: Lazio
- Province: Latina (LT)

Area
  - Total: 73 km^{2} (28 sq mi)

Population (31 July 2021)
  - Total: 37,244
  - Density: 510/km^{2} (1,300/sq mi)
- Time zone: UTC+1 (CET)
  - Summer (DST): UTC+2 (CEST)
- Patron saint: St. Erasmus and St. John
- Saint day: June 2 and June 24
- Website: Official website

UNESCO World Heritage Site
- Part of: Via Appia. Regina Viarum
- Criteria: Cultural: iii, iv, vi
- Reference: 1708-006
- Inscription: 2024 (46th Session)

Formia (ancient Formiae) is a city and comune in the province of Latina, on the Mediterranean coast of Lazio, Italy. It is located halfway between Rome and Naples, and lies on the Roman-era Appian Way.

== Mythology ==
According to the mythology the city was founded by Lamus, son of Poseidon, who was the king of the Laestrygones.

== History ==
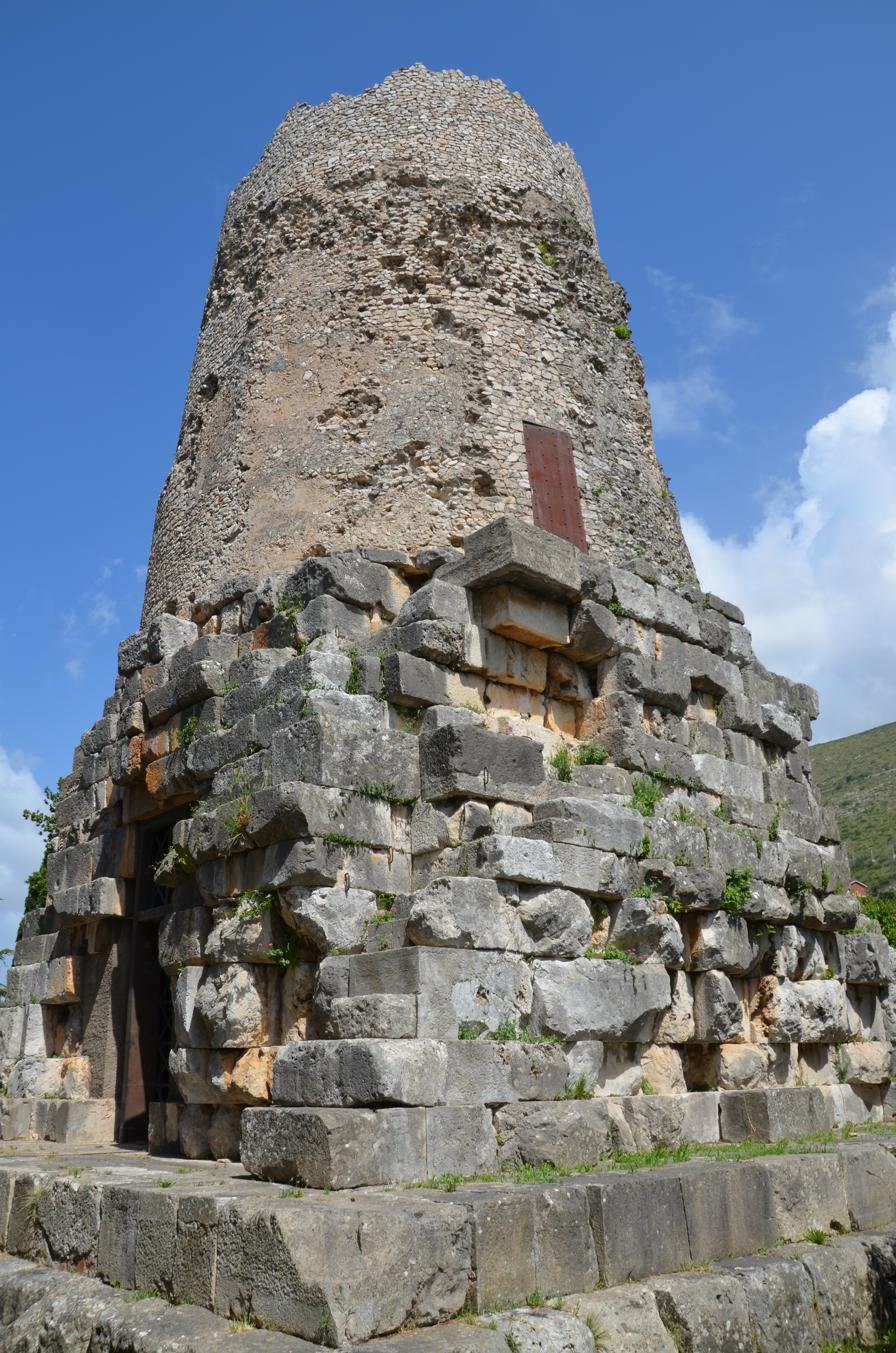
The so-called Tomb of Cicero

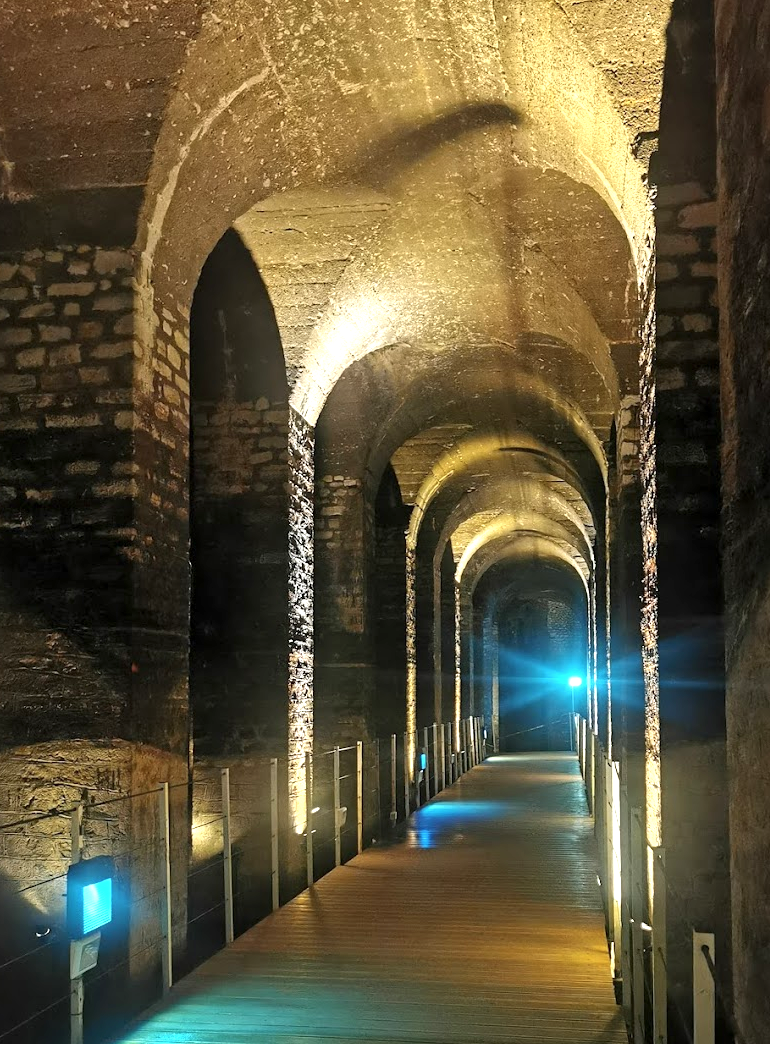
Cistern "Cisternone romano"

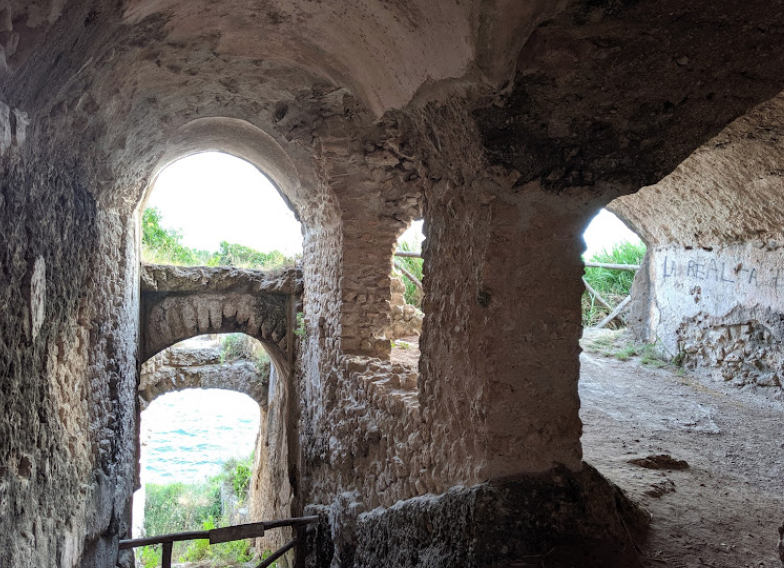
Cistern "Grotta della Janara"

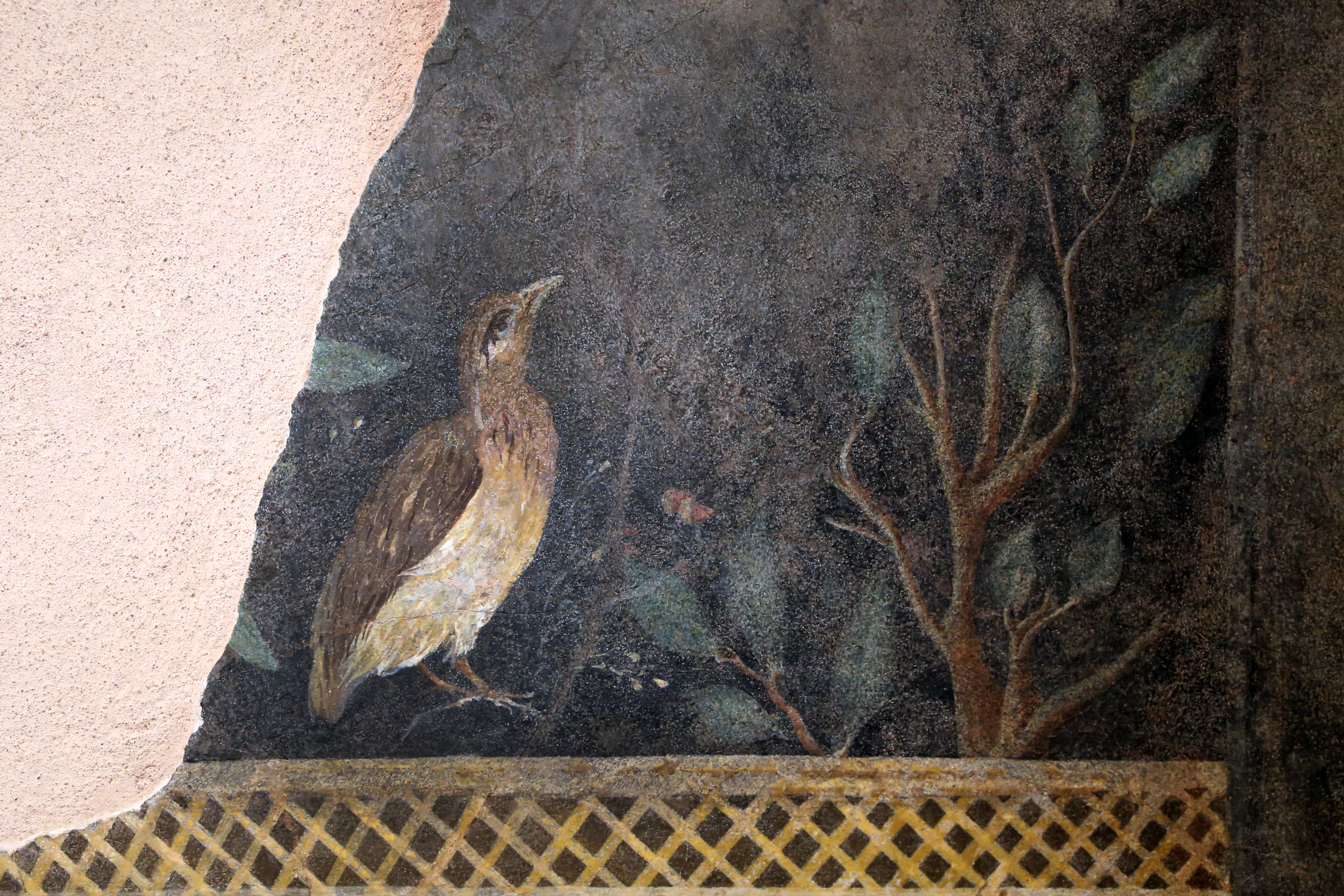
Fresco from Piazza Mattei, 1st c. AD

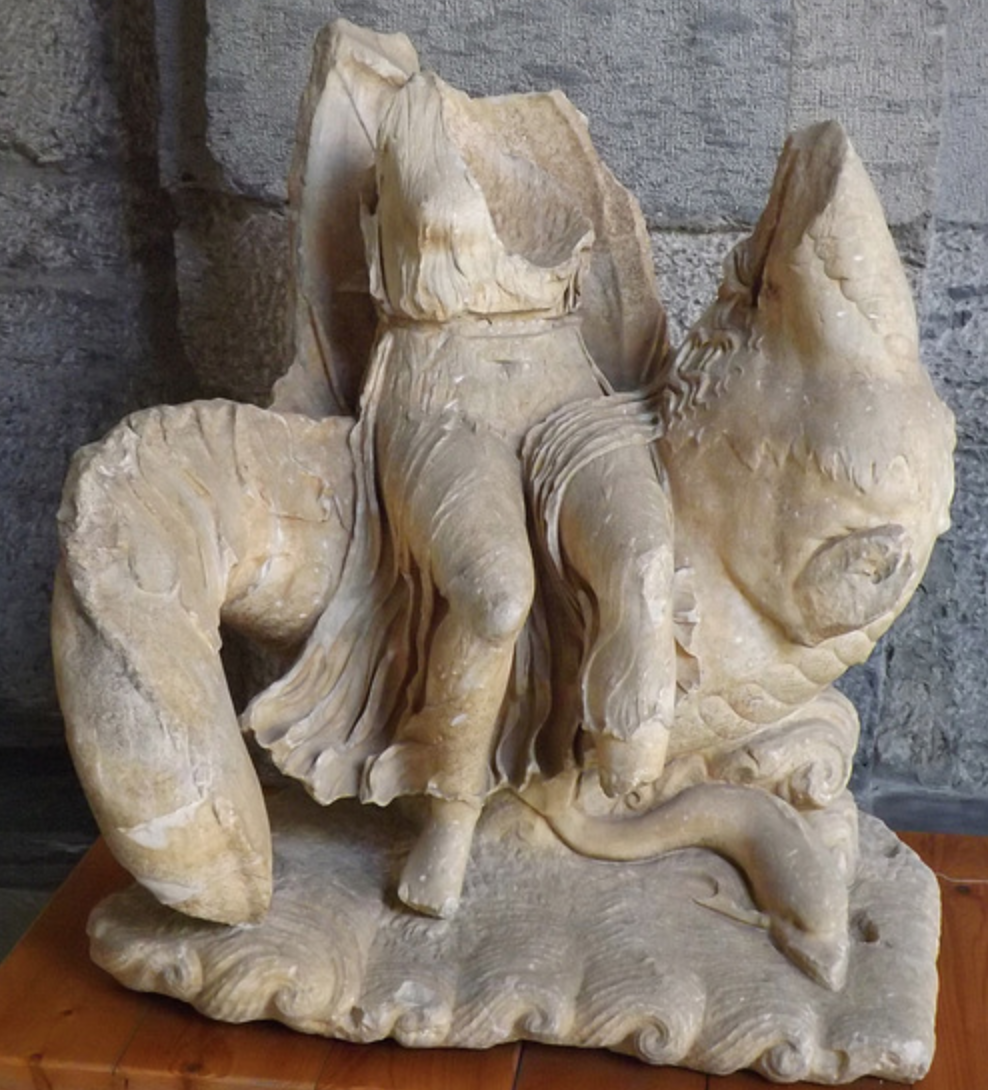
Nereid from a villa in Formiae

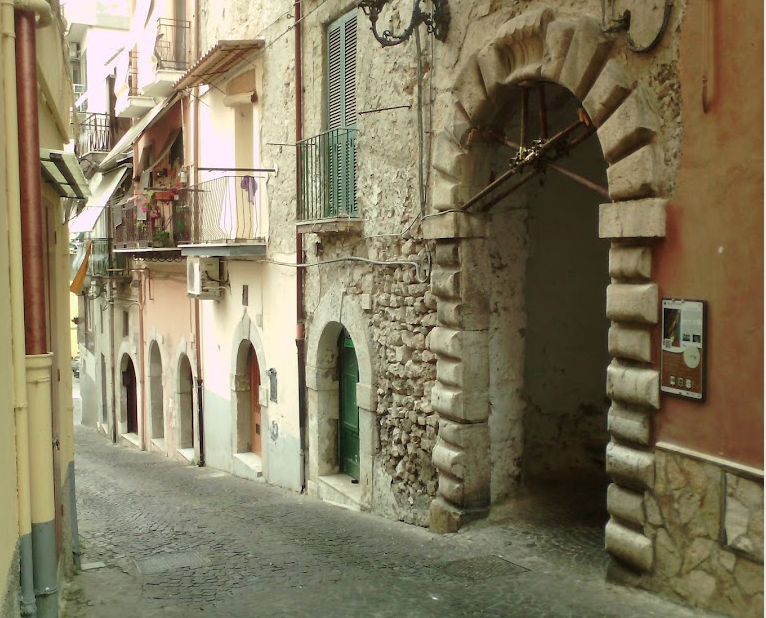
Theatre entrance

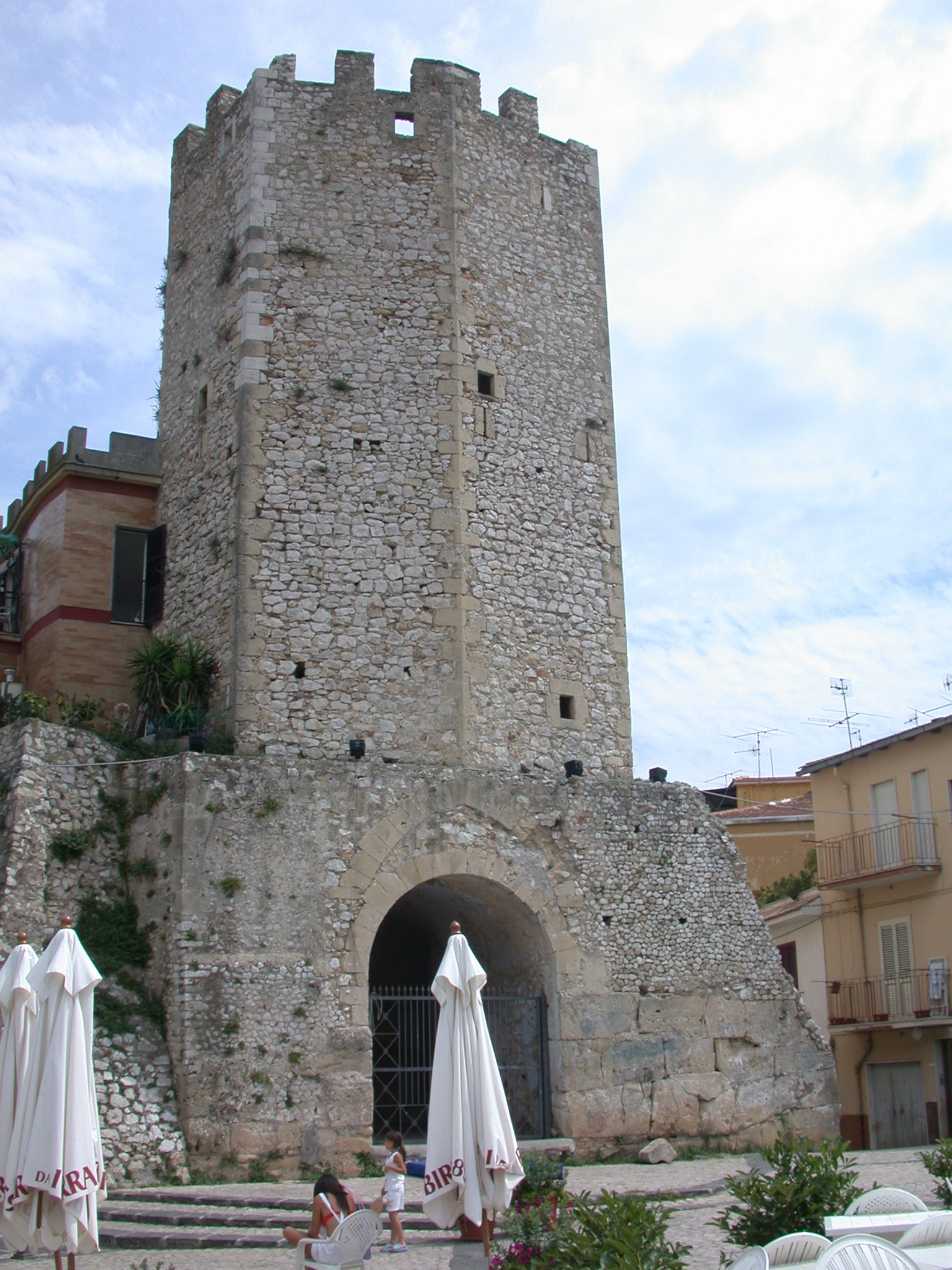
The octagonal tower of Castellone.

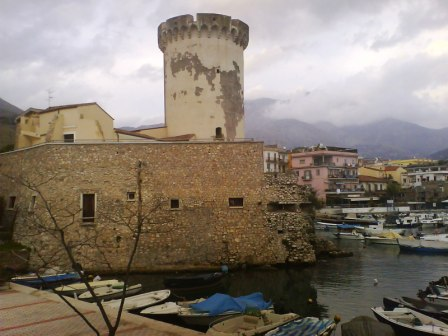
The tower of Mola Castle.

Formiae was founded by the Italic population of the Aurunci. It was called Formiae (derived from Hormia or Ormiai, after its excellent landing) by ancient authors.

It appeared for the first time in history in 338 BC when, after the Latin Wars, it received the Roman status of Civitas sine suffragio as it remained neutral, together with the city of Fondi. Throughout antiquity the city of Caieta was also part of the Formian territory.

It became a renowned resort during the Republican era for rich Romans to build elaborate villas and Horace called it "the city of the Mamurrae" as the rich and noble equestrian family of Mamurra had strong interests there, including the villa-estate nearby at Gianola, which can still be seen. The impressive remains of Roman villas still stretch along the coast from the fishponds in the Nuovo Porto to Gaeta.

Cicero had a villa there. He was assassinated on the Appian Way just outside the town in 43 BC and his monumental tomb can also still be seen. The villa attributed to Cicero, now in the Villa Rubino, includes an elaborate nymphaeum and rooms decorated with frescoes and stucco. The hotel Villa Irlanda contains a cryptoporticus with stucco of the monumental villa of Lucius Marcius Philippus (consul 56 BC), stepfather of Augustus. Villa Caracciolo has a large court surrounded by rooms. Many marble sculptures have been removed from these villas, the majority of which are in the Museo Nazionale in Naples, notably a fine pair of Nereids riding on sea monsters.

Remains of an amphitheatre and theatre can be seen. The enormous underground cistern dug 15 m (49 ft) below ground was probably the biggest Roman urban cistern in the world until the Piscina Mirabilis was built at the end of the 1st c. BC.

Sextus Julius Frontinus (40 – 104 AD), "Curator Aquarum" of all the aqueducts of Rome, had a villa in Formiae in which Aelianus met the emperor Nerva.

The city was the site of St Erasmus's martyrdom around 303 AD, during the persecutions of Diocletian. St Erasmus later also became known as Saint Elmo, the patron saint of sailors. Paulinus of Nola and Therasia stopped at Formiae on their journey back to Nola after visiting Rome at Easter 408. There they read Augustine's letter 95 addressed to them.

After the fall of the Western Roman Empire the city was sacked by "barbarians" and the population moved to two distinct burghs on the nearby hill, which were under the rule of Gaeta. Charles II of Anjou built a fortress in the maritime burgh, Mola di Gaeta. The other burgh was known as Castellone, from the castle erected there in the mid-14th century by Onorato I Caetani, count of Fondi.

The two villages were united again in 1863 under the name of Formia. The reunited city was badly damaged in 1943–44 in bombing operations and the Battle of Anzio.

== Geography ==
Formia lies on the Tyrrhenian Sea, in southern Lazio, close to the town of Gaeta and next to the borders of Campania region.

The municipality borders with Esperia (FR), Gaeta, Itri, Minturno and Spigno Saturnia. It includes the hamlets (frazioni) of Castellonorato, Gianola-Santo Janni, Marànola, Penitro and Trivio.

== Main sights ==
The most famous monument of Formia is the mausoleum traditionally identified with the Tomb of Cicero: it is a 24-metre-high (79 ft) tower on the old Appian Way, enclosed in a large 83-by-68-metre (272 by 223 ft) funerary precinct.

Other sights include:

- Tower of Mola
- Tower of Castellone
- Roman cistern, one of the world's largest. Similar to the structures in Constantinople and in the Domitian's villa of Albano, it dates from the 1st century BC.
- Remains of the so-called Roman Villa of Mamurra at Gianola, partly destroyed in 1943, including the cisterns of 'Maggiore' and of '36 columns', aqueducts, cryptoporticus and thermal baths. At the centre of the villa at the highest point of the promontory was a grandiose octagonal building also known as the Temple of Janus, which was flanked by two wings and two porticos sloping down towards the sea. Nearby at Porticciolo Romano are the remains of its fishponds. Five busts of male heads dating from the 2nd/3rd century AD have recently been excavated
- Many remains of Roman villas along the coast
- Roman buildings in the town
- Church of San Giovanni Battista e Lorenzo, known from 841. It was almost entirely destroyed during World War II. It houses a panel by Antoniazzo Romano (c. 1490)
- Church of San Michele
- Church of San Luca, known from the 15th century. It has a recently discovered crypt with frescos of Episodes of the New Testament and Madonna del Latte.
- Renaissance monastery and church of Sant'Erasmo. It was erected on the alleged site of the saint's martyrdom.
- Archaeological Museum.
- Regional Park of Gianola and Mount of Scauri.
- Formia War Memorial, with the large bronze sculpture Sacraficio by Dora Ohlfsen-Bagge

== Sport ==
Formia is the seat of the National Athletics School of the Italian National Olympic Committee, founded in 1955. Athletes such as Pietro Mennea and Giuseppe Gibilisco trained here. Formia is also a hub for cycling events of various types; road cycling and mountain biking, all of which give access to Parks in Gaeta and Formia; Parco Monte Orlando, Parco Regionale Riviera di Ulisse, Parco Naturale dei Monti Aurunci, and Tours to Rome via the Old Highway. Formia also has great water sports to enjoy: windsurfing and sailing.

== Transportation ==
Formia itself is one of the most important transport hubs of southern Lazio. The Rome–Formia–Naples railway passes through Formia-Gaeta railway station, from which visitors and residents may travel by bus to Gaeta, Minturno, Spigno and other local towns.

Ferries and hydrofoils connect Formia to Ponza, Ischia and Ventotene.

== Twin towns – sister cities ==
Formia is twinned with:

- Ferrara, Italy
- Fleury-les-Aubrais, France, since 2004
- Gračanica, Bosnia and Herzegovina
- Haninge, Sweden
- Santeramo in Colle, Italy

== People ==
- Antonio Sicurezza, painter
- Vittorio Foa, politician
- Amadeo Bordiga, politician
- Dino Fava, professional footballer
- James V. Monaco, songwriter

== See also ==
- S.S. Formia Calcio
