= Temple of Zeus, Cyrene =

Ancient Greek temple at Cyrene, Libya

Coordinates: 32.8223°N 21.862°E

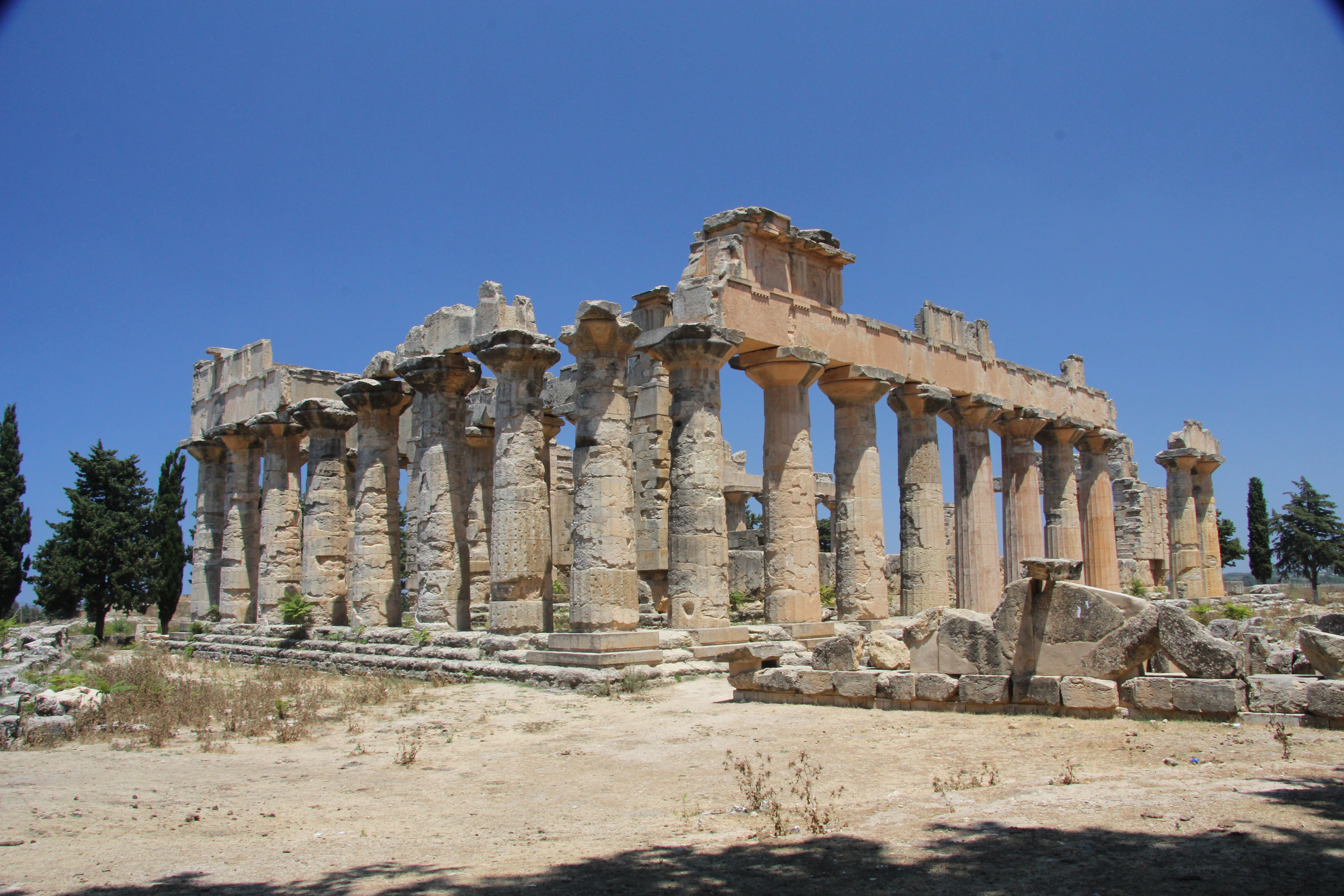
The reconstructed temple of Zeus, seen from the southwest

The Temple of Zeus was the largest ancient Greek temple at Cyrene, Libya, and one of the largest Greek temples ever built. The original Doric octastyle peripteral temple was constructed around 500–480 BC, and heavily damaged in 115 AD. Later in the century, it was partially rebuilt as a non-peripteral temple with a colossal cult statue. It was destroyed once more in 365 AD by an earthquake and then burnt by Christians.

== Description ==
The structure was built as a Doric octastyle peripteral temple. It faced east and stood atop a three-stepped crepidoma, with a length of 68.3 metres (224 ft) and a width of 30.4 metres (100 ft), making it roughly the same size as the Temple of Zeus at Olympia and the Parthenon at Athens. The front porch (pronaos) was supported by two columns in antis; the back porch (opisthodomos) by three columns in antis. The cella was two stories high and two rows of columns divided it into three aisles. The external colonnade (peripteros) has eight fluted columns at the front and rear and seventeen columns on each of the long sides. Its foundations are independent of the foundations of the cella, which may indicate that it was added later (this certainly occurred with the Temple of Apollo at Cyrene). Each column consisted of nine drums, with a diameter of 1.9 metres. The capitals weigh around 17 tonnes. The temple was built from shelly, low-quality limestone quarried immediately to the east; the hollow left by this later formed the south end of Cyrene's hippodrome.

A Latin building inscription (IRCyr. C.418) indicates that extensive renovations were undertaken late in the reign of Augustus (c. 5–14 AD), by an unnamed proconsul, who rededicated the structure to "Jupiter Augustus". The scale of this work is uncertain; it may have included new colonnades and the wholesale reconstruction of the east face of the temple.

The building was heavily damaged when Cyrene was sacked by Jewish fighters during the Kitos War in 115 AD. Archaeological evidence shows that at least 46 of the columns of the outer colonnade were undermined, by cutting away the crepidoma underneath them, inserting temporary wooden struts under the columns and then setting them on fire, causing the columns to collapse outwards.

=== Antonine restoration ===
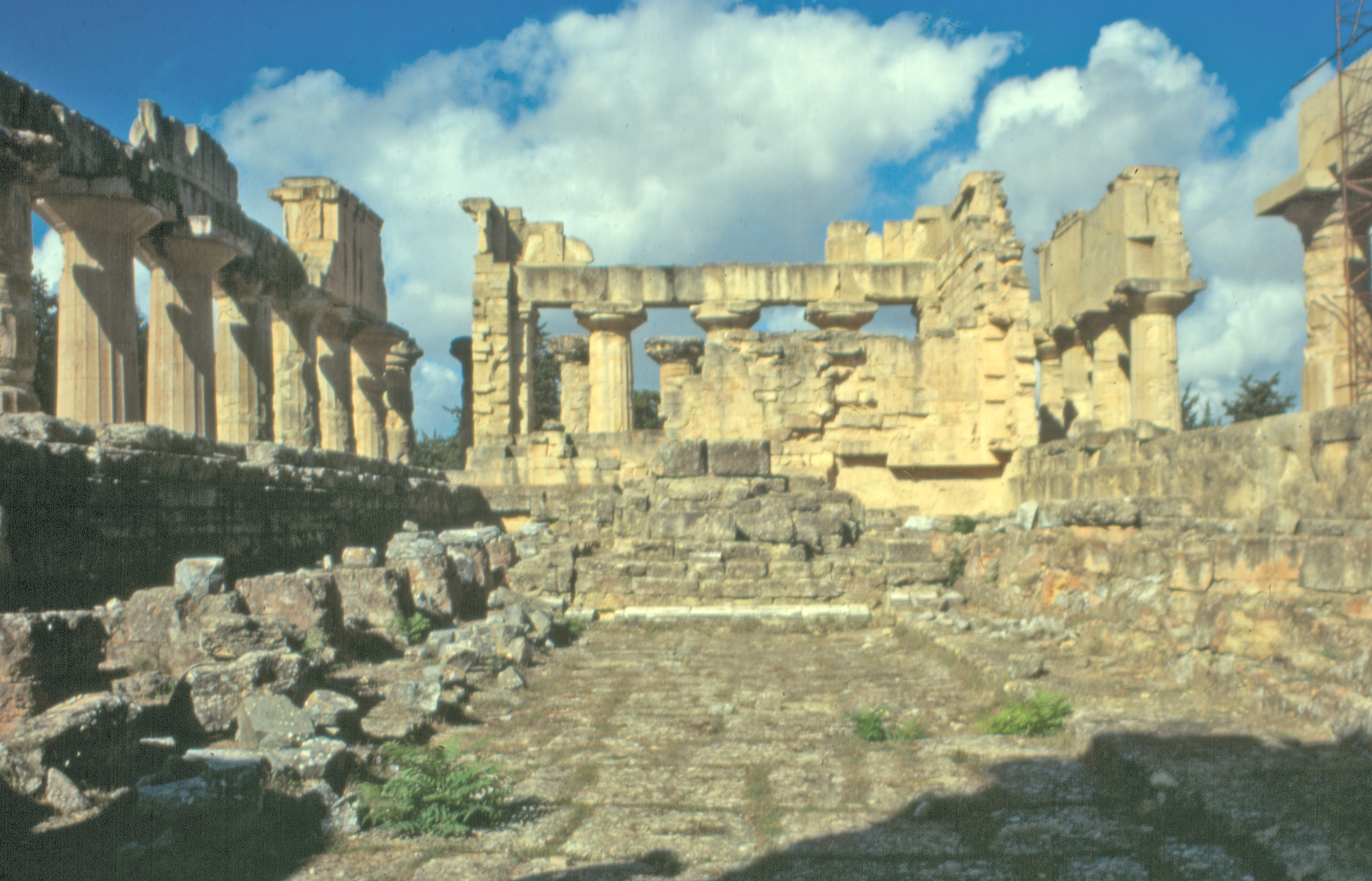
Internal view of the temple of Zeus, looking west towards the platform for the cult statue

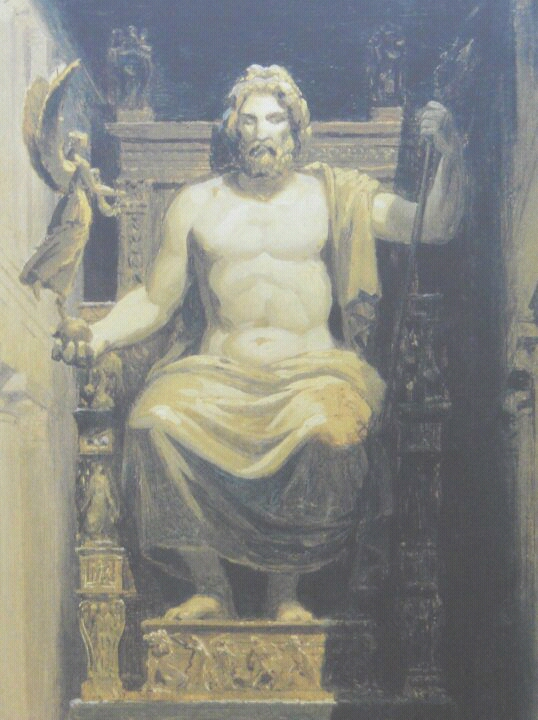
Artist's reconstruction of the Statue of Zeus at Olympia

Following the end of the war, the temple was restored. A set of inscriptions on the east architrave (IRCyr. C.419-420) record that this restoration work was completed by the proconsul Claudius Attalus between 172 and 175 AD, during the reign of Marcus Aurelius. The cella was rebuilt, but an attempt to re-erect the external colonnade was almost immediately abandoned. The floor of the cella was lowered by over a metre and a descending staircase added inside the entrance. The internal walls of the cella were coated in marble and the internal colonnades were removed in favour of a set of engaged columns (ten on each side), made of cipollino marble, with Corinthian capitals made of marble from Proconnesus. A staircase was installed at the front of the crepidoma, slightly off-centre.

Further renovations were carried out in the reign of Commodus, between 185 and 192 AD (IRCyr. C.421). This work involved the construction of a platform in the cella and an acrolithic replica of the Statue of Zeus at Olympia. The base of the throne measures about 8 metres (26 ft) wide by 10 metres (33 ft) long, with a separate base for the statue's footstool in front of it. Marble fragments of the fingers, toes, torso, and arms of this statue survive, as well as cedar and nails from the throne, and plaster fragments of the drapery. Column drums from the external colonnade were reused as supports for the statue's throne. Marble fragments of this statue are kept in the Cyrene Archaeological Museum. The architect Aurelius Rufus, who erected a small inscription (IRCyr. C.422) at this time, may have been responsible for this statue or for the earlier renovations.

The temple was toppled by the 365 Crete earthquake. Some time thereafter, Christians purged the structure, thoroughly smashing the internal columns and statues and burning the ruins. The head of a life-size statue of Zeus from the sanctuary was smashed into over a hundred pieces.

=== Surrounding structures ===
There are a number of structures in front of the temple, which formed part of the sanctuary. In front of the temple and slightly north of its axis is a rectangular Hellenistic precinct roughly 20 metres (66 ft) long and 10 metres (33 ft) wide, which was accessed from the south. Inside, there was a small stoa along the western side and a tiny second-century AD temple ("the East temple") with an altar in front of it. This structure may have acted as a temporary temple for Zeus between the destruction of the main temple in 115 AD and its restoration in the 170s AD. The head from a life-sized statue of Zeus, now in the Cyrene museum, may have derived from the cult statue in the east temple.

North of the rectangular precinct are three banqueting halls (hestiatoria), with mosaic floors. They date to the late third or early second centuries BC. Between them is a small fourth-century BC Doric shrine, which has been identified as a treasury.

== Excavation ==
The size of the blocks meant that the ruined structure was noted by nineteenth century travellers. The first excavations were undertaken by Robert Murdoch Smith and E. A. Porcher in 1861. The Italian army used the ruins as a quarry for construction of a barracks in 1915. Giacomo Guidi completely excavated the cella in 1926. The rest of the temple was fully excavated by Gennaro Pesche from 1939 until 1942, when the Allied conquest of Libya brought excavations to a close. The Department of Antiquities of Cyrenaica carried out further clearance work in 1954 and British Army re-erected one and a half columns in 1957. A long process of anastylosis led to the re-erection of most of the temple between 1967 and 2008. This project was undertaken partially to protect the blocks from further erosion. The resulting structure is anachronistic, combining the Classical peristyle with the Imperial-period cella.

== Bibliography ==
- Dinsmoor, William Bell (1950). The Architecture of Ancient Greece: An Account of Its Historic Development. Biblo & Tannen Publishers. ISBN 978-0-8196-0283-1.
- Goodchild, R. G.; Reynolds, J. M.; Herington, C. J. (1958). "The Temple of Zeus at Cyrene". Papers of the British School at Rome. 26: 30–62. doi:10.1017/S0068246200007054. ISSN 0068-2462. JSTOR 40310596.
- Guidi, Giacomo (1927). "Lo Zeus di Cirene". Africa Italiana. 1: 4–6.
- Kenrick, Philip (2013). Cyrenaica. Libya Archaeological Guides. Vol. 2. Silphium Press. ISBN 978-1-900971-14-0.
- Luni, Mario (2014). La scoperta di Cirene: un secolo di scavi (1913-2013). Roma: "L'Erma" di Bretschneider. ISBN 9788891306425.
- Pesce, Gennaro (1947–1948). "Il " Gran Tempio " in Cirene". Bulletin de Correspondance Hellénique. 71–72 (1): 307–358. doi:10.3406/bch.1947.2542.
- Stucchi, Sandro (1976). Architettura cirenaica. Rome: Bretschneider. ISBN 887062448X.
- Wright, G. R. H. (1994). "A Note on the Temple of Zeus at Cyrene and its Re-Erection". Libyan Studies. 25: 185–190. doi:10.1017/S0263718900006336.
