= Dora Ohlfsen-Bagge =

Australian painter, sculptor, and medallist (1869–1948)

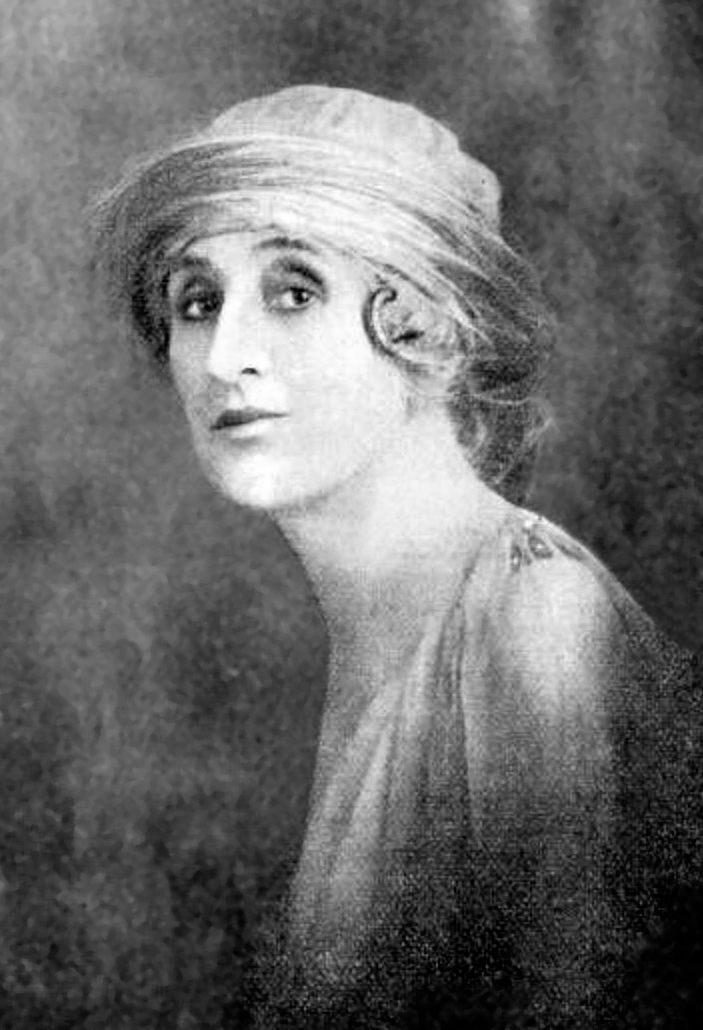
Dora Ohlfsen, 1908

Adela Dora Ohlfsen-Bagge (22 August 1869 – 7 February 1948), known professionally as Dora Ohlfsen, was an Australian sculptor and art medallist. (Note: For date of birth, The Ballarat Star, 24 August 1869. p. 2: "BIRTH. Bagge.—On the 22nd August, at East street, Ballarat East, Mrs C. H. Ohlfsen Bagge, of a daughter." For date of death, Chanin & Miller 2015, p. 170.) Working mostly in Italy, her first prominent work was a bronze medallion, The Awakening of Australian Art (1907), which won an award at the 1908 Franco-British Exhibition in London and was purchased for the Petit Palais in Paris. Other notable works include the Anzac Medal (1916), created to raise funds for Australians and New Zealanders who fought in the Gallipoli campaign, and Sacrifice (1926), the war memorial in Formia, Italy.

Ohlfsen's portrait medallions were commissioned by or on behalf of a wide range of public figures, such as the actor Mary Anderson, the poet Gabriele D'Annunzio, and several senior politicians, including H. H. Asquith, David Lloyd George, Billy Hughes, and Mussolini, who allowed her to sketch him in 1922 at the Palazzo Chigi while he worked.

In 1948 Ohlfsen and her lifelong partner, Hélène de Kuegelgen, were found dead in their apartment in Rome as a result of a gas leak, deemed by the police to have been an accident. The women were buried together in the city's non-Catholic cemetery, and friends packed up the contents of Ohlfsen's studio, which have never been traced. Twenty-five of her works are known to have survived, out of at least 121.

== Early life and education ==
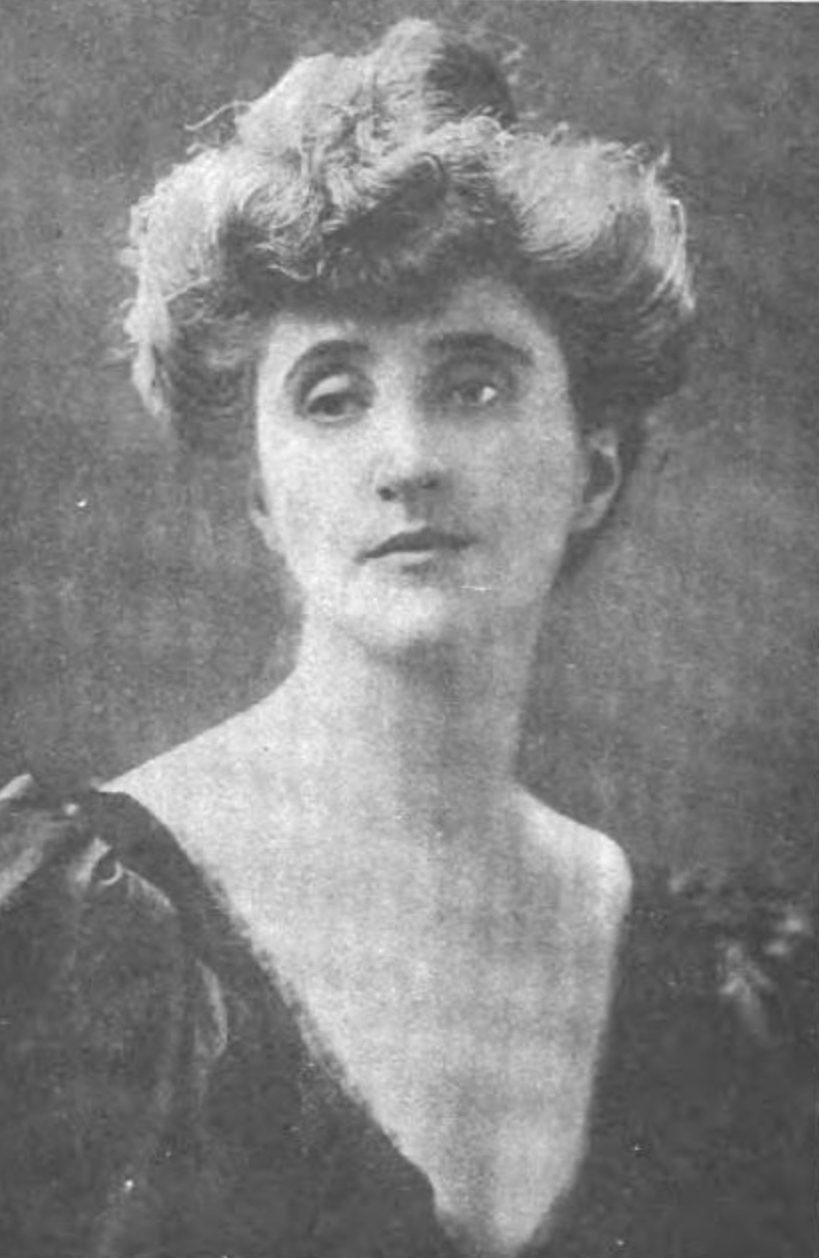
From a cover story by Rivista di Roma, March 1908

The fourth of seven daughters, Ohlfsen was born in Ballarat, Victoria, to Kate Ohlfsen-Bagge, née Harrison, an Australian whose family were from England, and Christian Hermann Ohlfsen-Bagge, an engineer born in Grabionna (now Poland) of Norwegian stock.

The family was well known locally. Kate Ohlfsen-Bagge was the daughter of Captain John Harrison—born in Cumberland, England, and known in Australia for land squatting and political activism—and granddaughter of the first government printer in Victoria, George Howe. Christian Ohlfsen-Bagge moved to Australia in 1849 and made money during the Victorian gold rush. In 1855 he was the architect of the Olympic Theatre in Melbourne (demolished in 1894), which had been constructed in England and shipped to Australia, and he was involved in the construction of the Ballarat public library and the Bondi Ocean Outfall Sewer.

When Ohlfsen was 14, the family moved to 4 Mona Terrace, Darling Point, a suburb of Sydney, and from 1884 to 1886 she attended Sydney Girls High School. A 1908 Sydney Mail profile described her when she left school as a "tall, willowy girl of 16, with a very distinguished manner, beautiful dark eyes, and hair, and a brilliant complexion". From around 1888 she studied piano under the French pianist Henri Kowalski, (Note: Henri Kowalski lived in Sydney from 1885 to 1896.) and in June 1889 she performed at the Criterion Theatre. The Sydney Mail's Illustrated Supplement featured a profile of her in January 1893, reporting that she had taken Kowalski's place at the Sydney University Musical Society in May 1891 when he had been unable to play—the reporter said "her touch was clear and sparkling"—and at the city's YMCA hall the following May she had given a recital that included Beethoven's Piano Sonata No. 23.

In or around July 1892 Ohlfsen decided to study music in Berlin, a plan that was financed by a female friend, apparently with help from Francis Bathurst Suttor, the Australian Minister for Education, and Alfred Pelldram, Consul-General of Germany for Australia. The Sydney Morning Herald reported that she would leave Sydney on the SS Oldenburg for Bremen, Germany, on 24 December 1892.

== Berlin and St. Petersburg ==
Information about Ohlfsen's life in Europe derives in large measure from Ohlfsen herself, mostly in letters to journalists and friends, including Gother Mann, director of the Art Gallery of New South Wales. There are inconsistencies between the accounts. The historian Ros Pesman writes that "either [Ohlfsen], the journalist, or both constructed a romantic narrative of the life of the 'lady artist', a little outré and eccentric, including early exotic adventuring and later participation in a cosmopolitan and sophisticated art world."

In Berlin she attended Theodor Kullak's Neue Akademie der Tonkunst, where she studied under Moritz Moszkowski and said she had played for the Kaiser. Her time in Berlin was cut short by health problems, which she attributed to neuritis in her left arm. "All arrangements were made for my debut," she told an interviewer, "and a concert tour through Germany arranged, for which I was to be paid. Now, it was almost unheard of for a debutante to receive payment, and a foreigner appearing there had never previously been paid. My master had arranged that I should. Just as everything was ready, neuritis of the arm developed in a bad way, and I had to give up music entirely, and all thought of becoming a pianiste." She also called it a nervous breakdown caused by "overwork and too little money". The Australian Economic Depression of 1890 had reportedly left her father unable to fund her studies.

Her career as a pianist over, she visited friends in Oranienbaum, Russia, on the Gulf of Finland, and there, it seems, she met her lifelong companion, Hélène (or Elena) de Kuegelgen, a Russian countess. By 1896 she was trying to make a living in St. Petersburg. "I taught music, counterpoint and harmony," she wrote, "coaching musical students for their examinations. Then I became a sort of private secretary to the American ambassador [Ethan A. Hitchcock]. He had a newspaper in St. Louis, of which he still retained control while carrying out his ambassadorial duties." Apparently she wrote articles on Russian issues for American newspapers under the ambassador's byline. She began studying painting and sculpture and said she had painted a "great matchbox of wood" that the Empress of Russia bought at a bazaar. She also began studying theosophy, a common interest at the time, and said she had turned to art after spiritual voices urged her to do so.

== Move to Rome ==
=== Via di S. Nicola da Tolentino ===
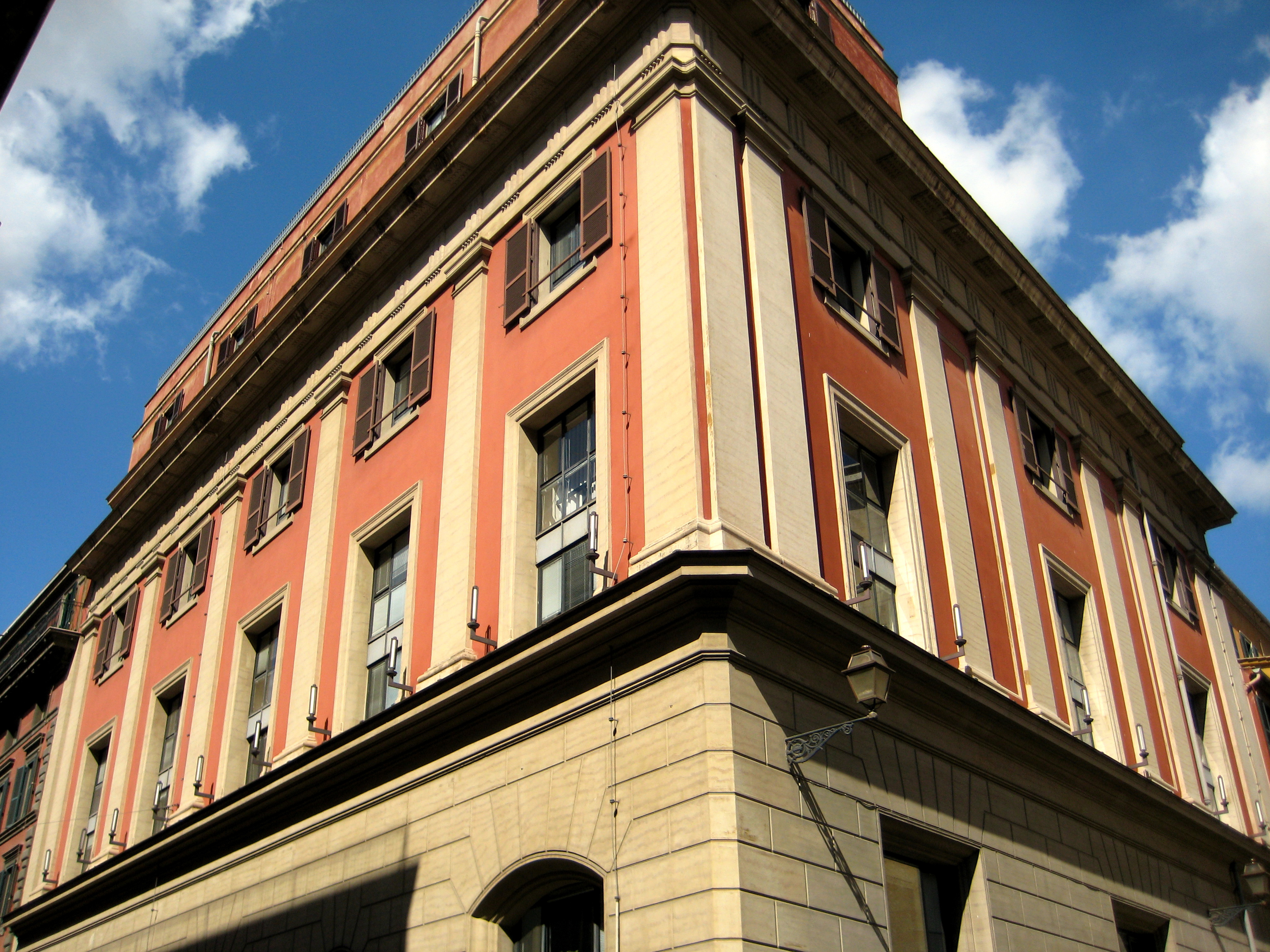
Via di S. Nicola da Tolentino 72, Rome; the corner windows are thought to have been Ohlfsen's studio.

Fearing the onset of the 1905 Russian Revolution, Ohlfsen and Kuegelgen moved to Rome in 1902. "From an artist's viewpoint," she wrote, "there is no country like Italy. Its very air breathes the cameraderie and Bohemianism which every artist craves." (Note: The Evening Sun, Baltimore (25 February 1924): "I studied in Rome. From an artist's viewpoint, there is no country like Italy. Its very air breathes the cameraderie and Bohemianism which every artist craves. I studied sculpture and the engraving of medals—of which I am very fond—at the French Academy here and painting at the Spanish Academy here.") In letters and interviews, Ohlfsen said she had taken painting classes from Manuel Benedito-Vives at the Spanish Academy; Kuegelgen apparently worked there in or around 1906, perhaps as a model. Ohlfsen also said she had been taught sculpture by Camille Alaphilippe at the French Academy in Rome; Paul Landowski, creator of Christ the Redeemer in Rio de Janeiro; and the metal engraver Pierre Dautel. Art historians Eileen Chanin and Steven Miller note that the French Academy was open only to male French citizens at the time, so Ohlfsen probably attended evening classes there. They write that Dautel, who specialized in medallion portraits and had been compared to Pisanello, had the greatest influence on Ohlfsen.

The women settled into a studio and apartment at Via di S. Nicola da Tolentino 72, opposite the church of San Nicola da Tolentino agli Orti Sallustiani and near Piazza Barberini. It seems they lived there until their deaths in 1948. The Via di S. Nicola da Tolentino was a well-known haunt of writers and artists. The American sculptor Augustus Saint-Gaudens lived at No. 72 in 1871–1875, as did Franklin Simmons during Ohlfsen's time there. Louisa May Alcott, author of Little Women (1868), apparently had an apartment on the same street in 1870–1871 and, according to Susan Cheever, sat for her first portrait in the studio of the American artist George Healy, also on S. Nicola da Tolentino. "[A]ll the well-known singers, artists, men of letters, society leaders are to be seen," a reporter wrote of Ohlfsen's weekly salons in her studio, "and almost every language to be heard."

Engraving portraits on medallions became fashionable in Europe in the early 20th century, and Kuegelgen used her connections to secure commissions. In 1903 three of Ohlfsen's paintings were exhibited in Rome at the annual Mostra Della Società Amatori e Cultori di Belle Ari; she told a reporter she had been introduced to Queen Elena of Italy. In 1905 three of her portrait low reliefs (bas-reliefs) were shown there, and she exhibited again in 1906 and 1907. Her work at this time included a medallion of Hélène de Kuegelgen (c. 1903), one called Mother and child (1906), medallions of Mattia Battistini and Solomiya Krushelnytska (1906). and of the actor Mary Anderson (1906), which Ohlfsen created in England while staying at Anderson's home in Broadway, Worcestershire. Nellie Melba, the Australian soprano, who also sat for one in England in 1906.

In June 1907 the art historian Arturo Jahn Rusconi wrote in Emporium of Ohlfsen's "delightful bas-reliefs in bronze, portraits and various compositions, executed with tremendous grace and subtlety of spirit. This year, as well as some portrait medals and plaquettes finely worked up, she has exhibited a very beautiful plaque, Autumn [l'Autunno], which together with refined taste also demonstrates mastery of sculptural modelling."

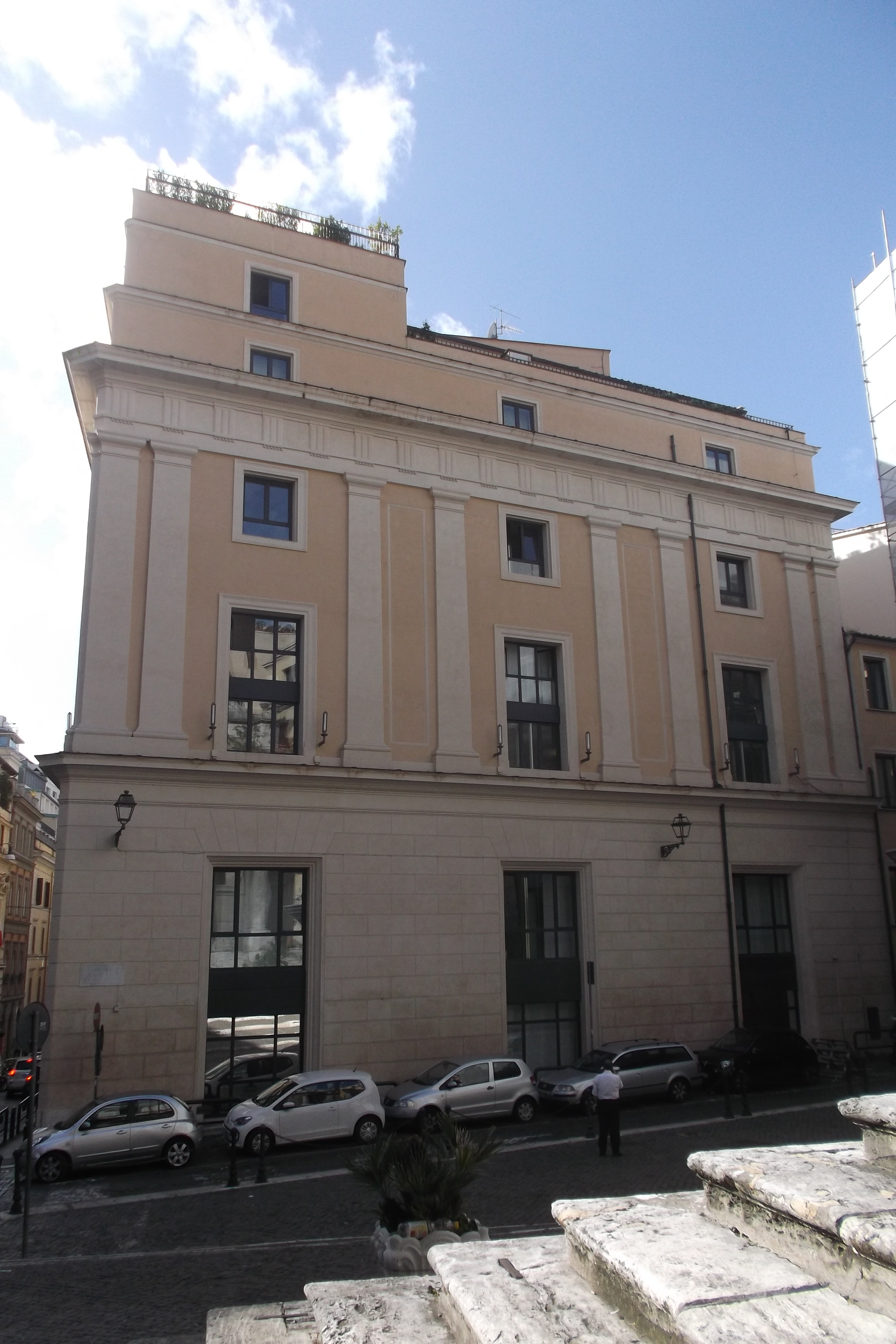
Via di S. Nicola da Tolentino 72 in 2019

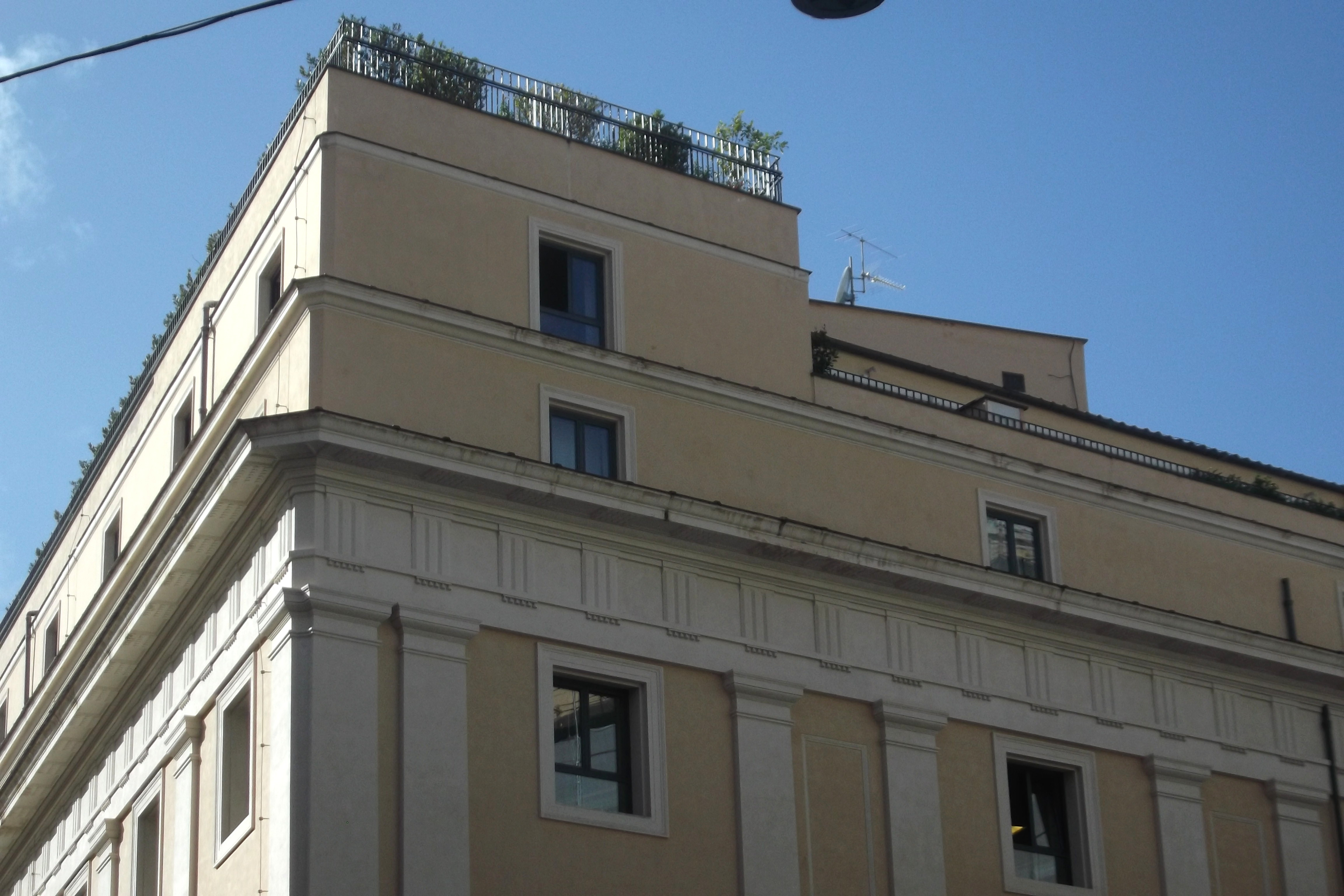
The corner windows are thought to have been Ohlfsen's.

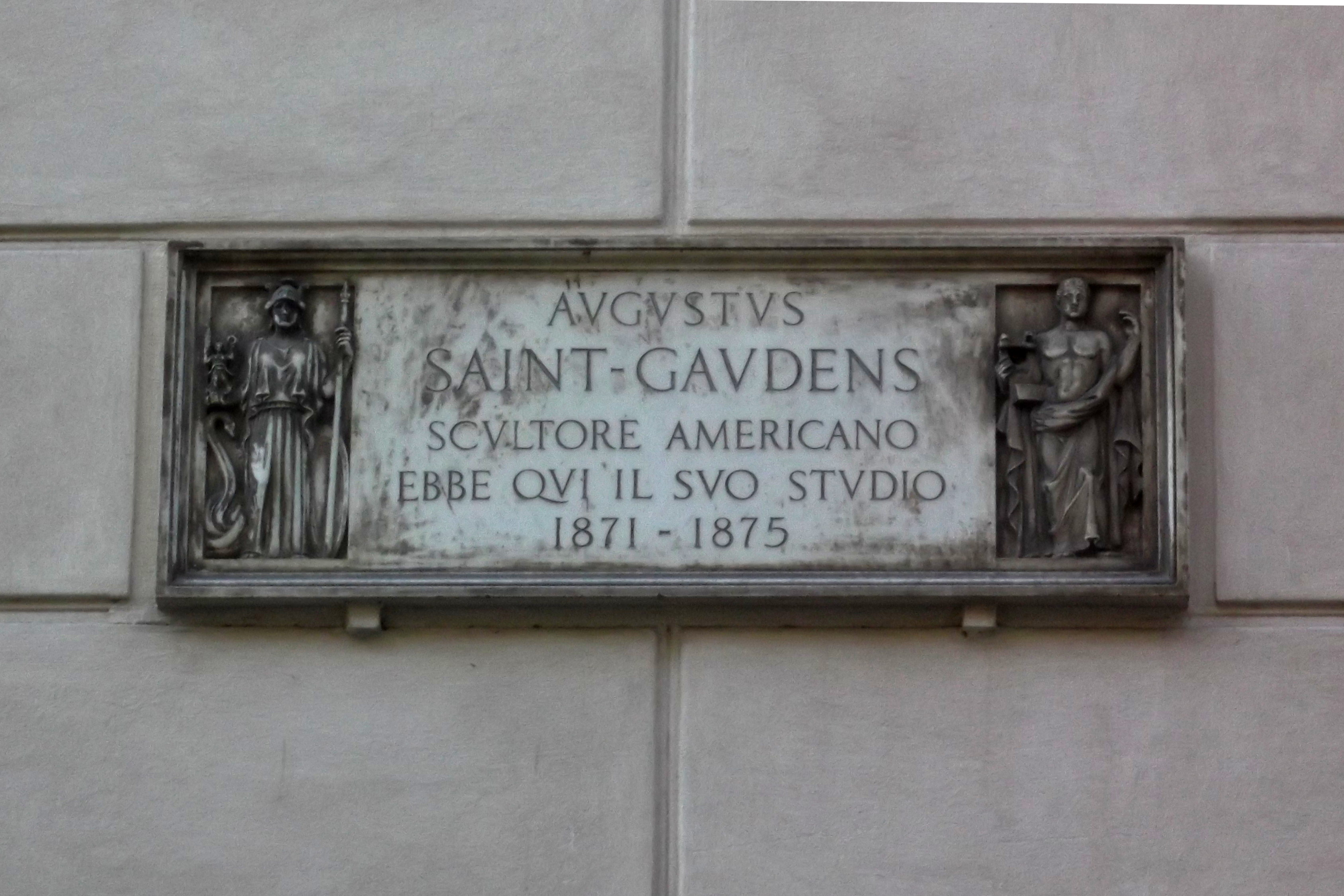
Plaque on the building for Augustus Saint-Gaudens

=== The Awakening of Australian Art (1907) ===
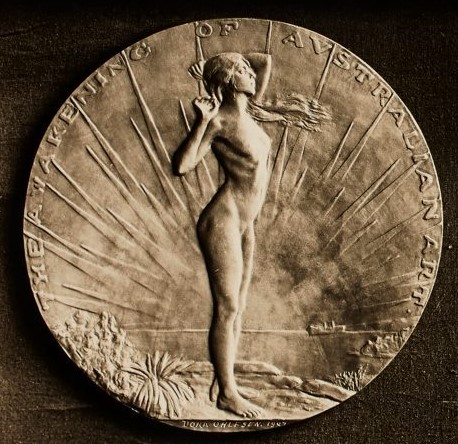
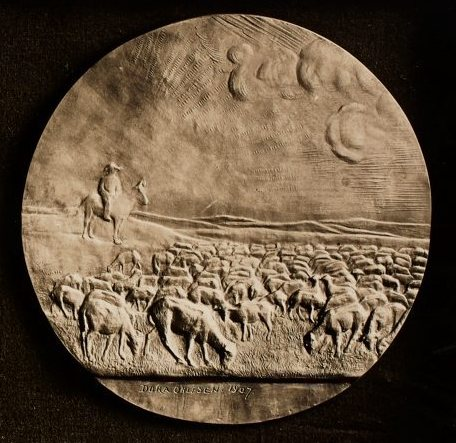

The first of Ohlfsen's art to be added to a public collection was The Awakening of Australian Art (1907), a bronze medallion 29.5 cm in diameter, which the French government purchased in 1907 for the Petit Palais. "Australia is personified as the New Dawn or Venus arising from the sea," Chanin and Miller write. The pastoral scene on the back, with its "strangely living flock of sheep and the lonely shepherd", conveys "the whole soul and spirit of wide spaces of marvellous solitude and of newness and freedom", in the view of one reporter. "Miss Ohlfsen has caught the spirit of Australia." In June 1908 the medal won an award at the Franco-British Exhibition in London. A few months earlier, Ohlfsen's work had been praised in Rivista di Roma, in a three-page cover story by Rusconi:

The spirit of a Pisanello, a Boldù or a Matteo de' Pasti is revived in the tenuous and robust medals of the very young sculptor. In their subtle, low relief, of necessity restrained as to light and shade, they vibrate with an intense spirit of life, as do some of the most famous medals of our Renaissance. And while in the male portraits, character and thought are so energetically expressed, those of women breathe a spirit that some of the great masters themselves have not known how to express. (Note: Arturo Jahn Rusconi (Rivista di Roma, March 1908): "Lo spirito di un Pisanello, d'un Boldu o d'un Matteo dei Pasti rivive nelle tenui e robuste medaglie della giovanissima scultrice. "Esse, nelle loro forme sottili, schiacciate, nei piani bassi e moderati che hanno un giuoco di luce e di ombre necessariamente ristretto, vibrano di un intenso spirito di vita, come talune tra le più famose megadlie del nostro Rinascimento. "E mentre nei ritratti maschili e cosi energicamente espresso il carattere ed il pensiero, in quelli femminili alita uno spirito di grazia cosi sottile e cosi languido, quale i grandi prototipi del Quattrocento non hanno saputo esprimere.")

The Art Gallery of New South Wales bought a full-sized cast of The Awakening of Australian Art in 1910. (Note: Chanin and Miller write that Ohflsen wanted the gallery to purchase the plaster model for the medal for £200 and the right to reproduce it, but they declined.) According to Chanin and Miller, Ohlfsen used several processes to create medals. The more traditional method was to work from the model in wax, after "cut[ting] the design on a soft block or a die. The die was then hardened and placed in a hydraulic press and the medal struck down from this." They offer her medal of Gabriele d'Annunzio (1907) as an example. For The Awakening, they believe she used a reducing machine. After creating a design in wax or clay, she would create a plaster cast and "from this, a positive casting in iron or bronze. This large metal model was then placed in a reducing machine and copied in a reduced size mechanically, probably on demand and often by a Parisian company which specialized in the process."

Frances Fitzgerald Elmes, who compared Awakening to Bertram Mackennal's Circe (c. 1893), reported in September 1908 that Ohlfsen had visited the Franco-British Exhibition in London, which, as well as showing Awakening, had also exhibited the medallion portrait of Mary Anderson. Another medallion shown in London and at the Paris Salon was Femminismo, which portrayed a 1908 suffragist march in London (probably Women's Sunday); on the back was a woman lifting a veil from her eyes. According to one reporter, the medal had "brought upon the artist a shower of appreciation from women of all countries in Paris at the time."

=== Visit to Sydney (1912–1913) ===
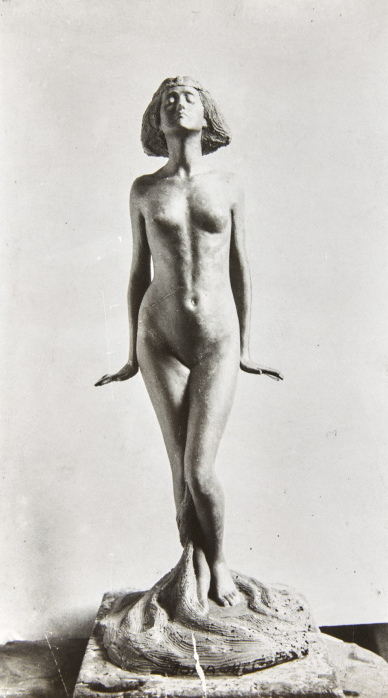
Ohlfsen's photograph of the plaster cast of Le septième voile ("The seventh veil", c. 1911). The work itself is lost.

By 1912 Ohlfsen's work was highly regarded. In 1909 she became the first Australian to be added to the Biographical Dictionary of Medallists, and the following year she was said to be working on a medallion of Archduke Eugen of Austria after Princess Marie of Windisch-Graetz introduced them. She sculpted three nudes around this time: The Pitcher Goes to the Fountain (c. 1909), Le septième voile (1911), and Dawn (by 1912), all lost.

Hoping to receive a commission in Australia, she returned for 15 months in July 1912. She had made clear in 1908 that she missed Australia: "The scent and sight of a piece of wattle, the scent of gum leaves, even the trying hot winds of Rome affect me indescribably, and bring with them a nostalgia which shows me that my heart is always entirely Australian." The Art Gallery of New South Wales bought five of her works after she submitted 20 pieces, including three statuettes, to a Royal Art Society of New South Wales exhibition in September 1912. Among the works shown was a medallion portrait in lead of Hélène de Kuegelgen, showing "that fair-haired beauty as a woman of noble elegance of face and figure, who leans her chin upon her hand. The modelling is full of detail, and the eye is charmed by the dimpled arm," according to the Sydney Morning Herald, which noted that Ohlfsen and Kuegelgen were living together in Rome. In June 1913 Campbell Carmichael, Minister of Education, unveiled Ohlfsen's bronze medallions of Shakespeare and Goethe in the auditorium of the Little Theatre. After Sydney, she held an exhibition of her medallions in Melbourne.

One of the medallions exhibited in Sydney was a replica of Femminismo (1908), the portrayal of a women's march. Before she left Australia in 1913, Ohlfsen said she had a message for Australian women: "[A]fter living in countries where women are working so hard for freedom I have been astonished at the casual attitude of the average woman. In other lands your Australian women are looked to as pioneers, as women with golden opportunities; but here you seem to take your advantages as a matter of course. ... It certainly is good to see the absence of the sex-antagonism which is so pronounced in other countries."

=== Art Gallery of New South Wales commission (1913) ===
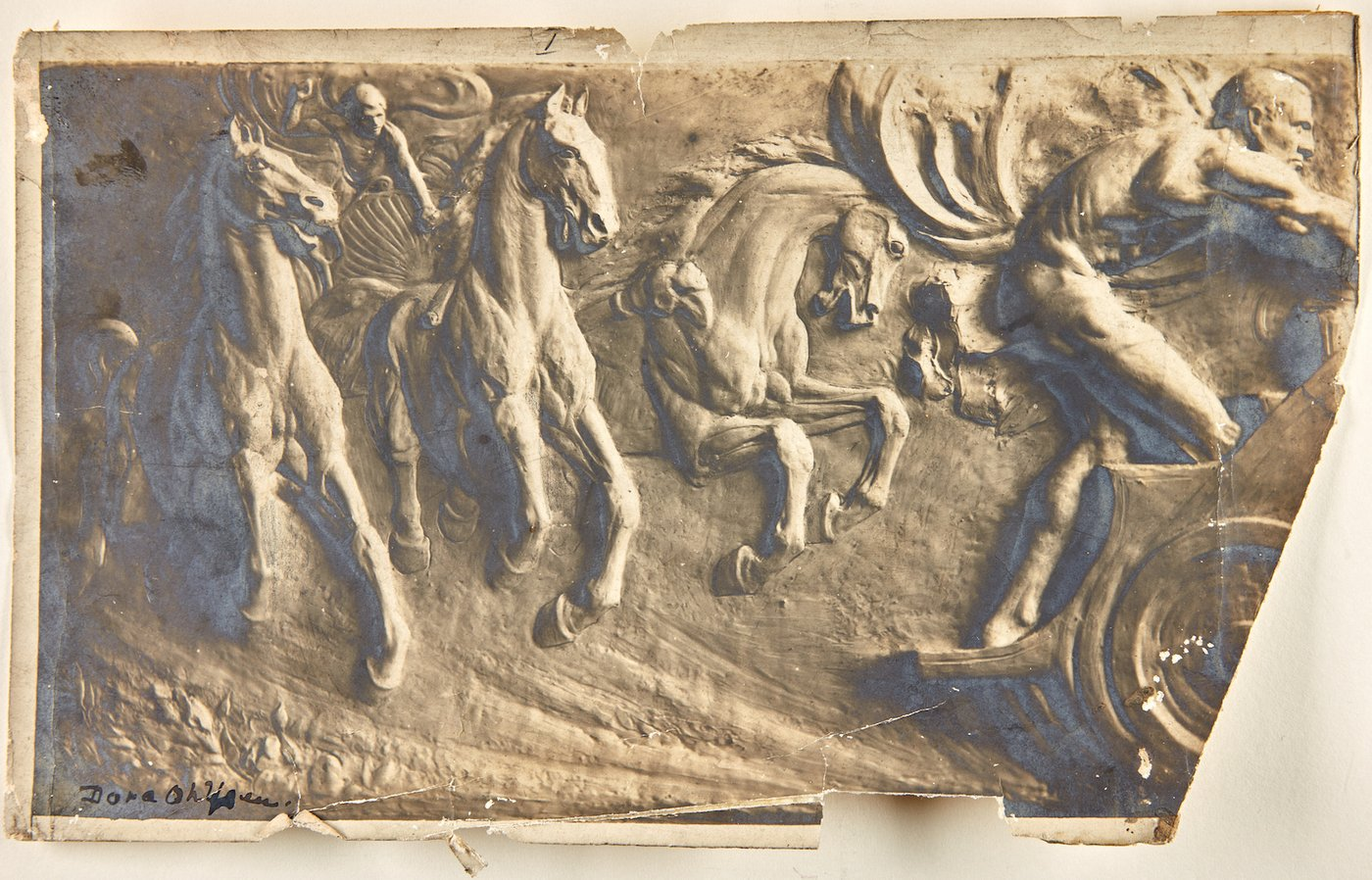
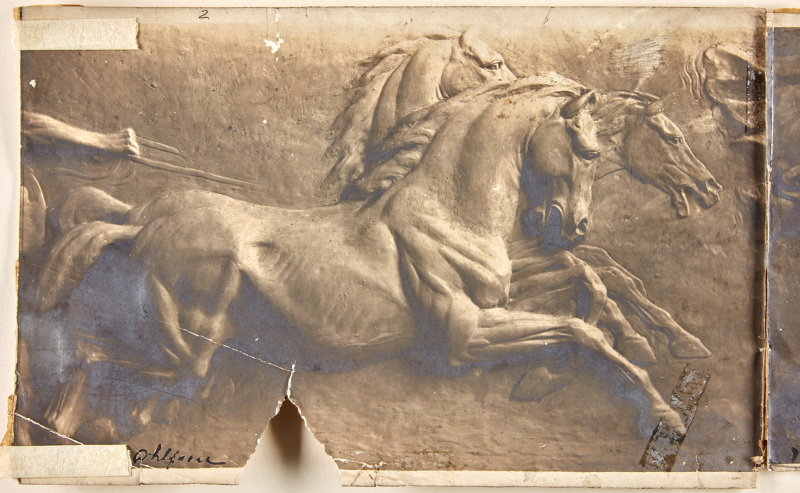
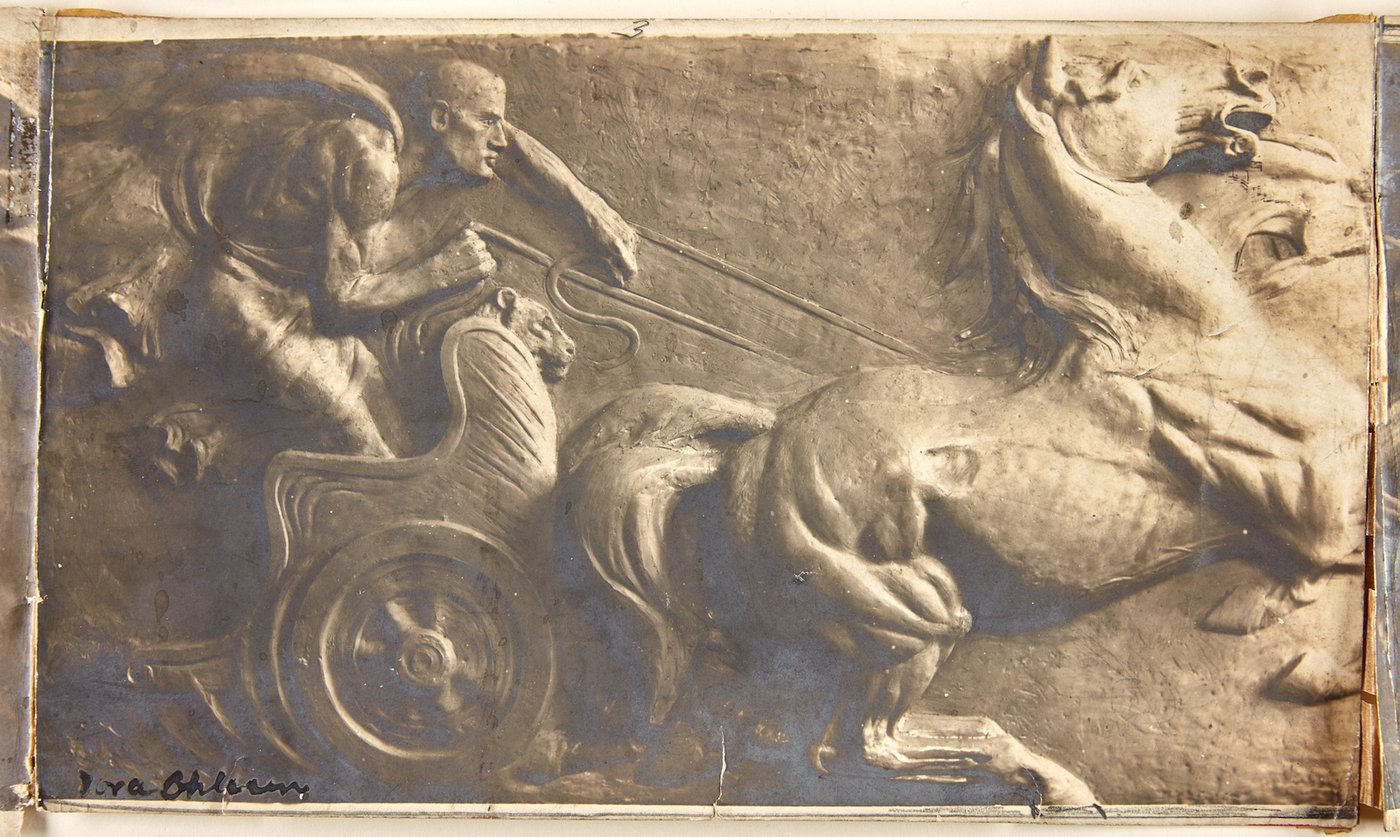
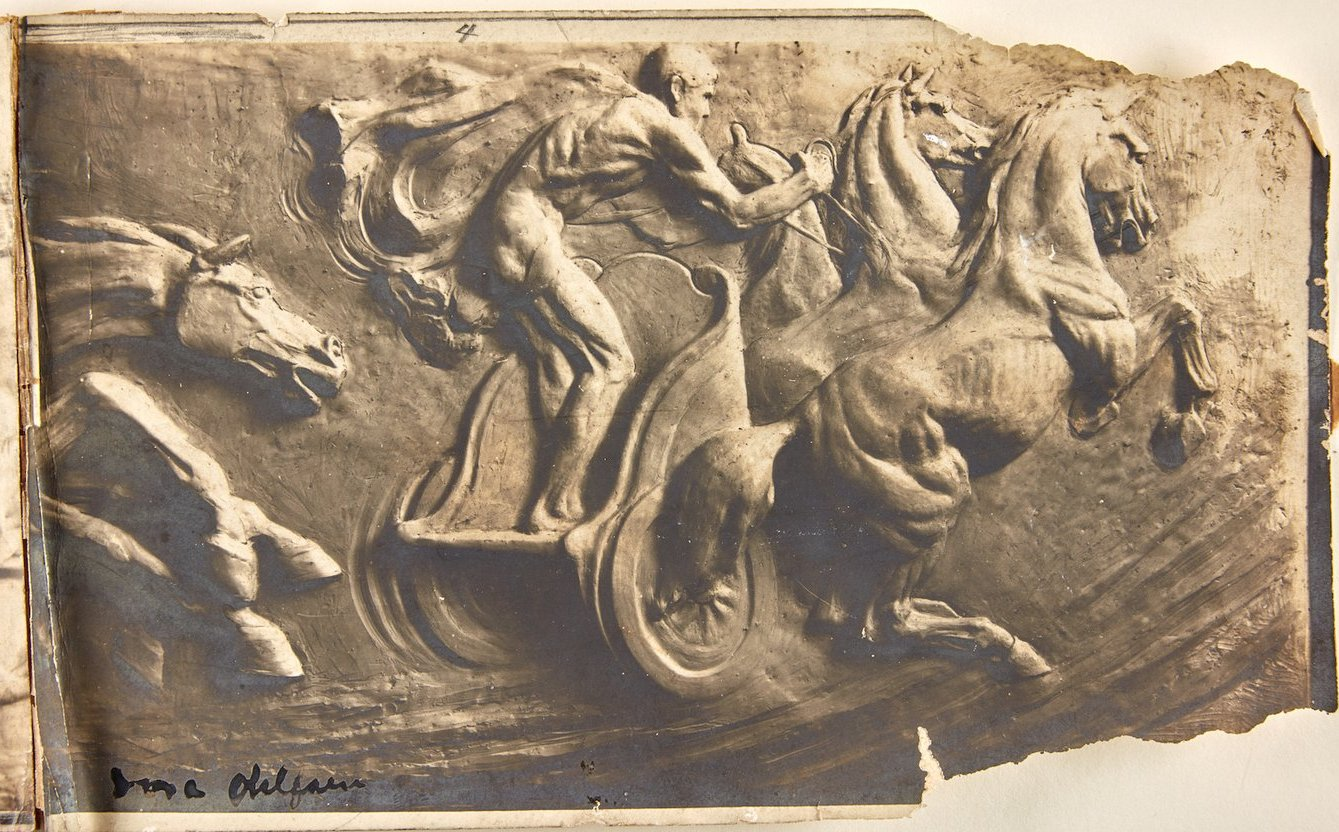
Ohlfsen's photographs of the cancelled commission; the work itself is lost.

The visit to Australia led to one of Ohlfsen's greatest artistic disappointments, when an important public commission was cancelled. The Art Gallery of New South Wales had commissioned her in August 1913—for £350, equivalent to $48,032 in 2022—to produce low-relief panels in bronze, 24 ft × 4 ft 6 in, to be installed on the façade directly above its front entrance. Two round panels on either side would display bronze portraits of Leonardo da Vinci and Michelangelo; the Siot-Decauville foundry in Paris would do the bronze casting. (Note: The building's architect, Walter Vernon, had included plans for such a sculpture in 1901.) Deciding to depict a chariot race—the Sydney Morning Herald called it "A Roman Chariot Race" in April 1914 (Note: The Sydney Morning Herald (7 April 1914): "A commission was given to Miss Dora Ohlfsen, an Australian sculptor now resident in Rome, to execute a bronze panel for the exterior entrance facade of the gallery/building. The subject is to be 'A Roman Chariot Race'.")—Ohlfsen began work on it after returning to Rome in October 1913. She told the newspaper she needed to work in her own studio "with my friends coming in and out, criticising and helping"; she hoped to return to Australia the following year to see it installed.

Chanin and Miller write that, inspired by Classical Greek art, Ohlfsen exaggerated the physicality of the men and horses so that a sense of movement remained evident from a distance. She had declared herself an admirer of Ivan Meštrović, the Serbian sculptor; she told a niece he was "the greatest sculptor in the world" and that he was currently "500 BC Greek". But it seems the gallery's trustees came to believe the sculpture's details would be lost from its position over the entrance. They responded positively to her proposals in December 1914, and in 1915 she took photographs of the work to London. (Note: The Daily Telegraph, Sydney (8 September 1915): "Miss Dora Ohlfsen, the well-known Sydney sculptress, who has been residing in Italy since she returned to Europe about 18 months after visiting her people in Sydney, has lately visited London. She had with her photographs of a fine piece of work she is executing for the Sydney Art Gallery. It is a relief in bronze, representing a Roman chariot race, and it will occupy a space of 21ft. in length by 4ft. 6in. in depth, over the entrance to the gallery. Its completion, however, is likely to he delayed, because casters in bronze are very difficult to find at present, as they have been summoned to take their places in the Italian army. It is possible the work, when finished, may be exhibited in England before being sent to Sydney. When the mall left England, Miss Ohlfsen intended leaving for Italy again in a few days, to take up duty as a military nurse there.") By 1917 she had sent the trustees photographs of the completed plaster cast (below), and later she sent them two examples of the cast, both lost. She said in 1920 that it had taken her two years to complete the cast and that she had exhibited it in Rome.

In September 1919, after a series of disputes, the trustees cancelled the commission. There had been a disagreement about the cost of bronze; Ohlfsen said the gallery's director, Gother Mann, must "really imagine that I have sums of money lying about in war time to spend like that on my own account. I am not Mackennal at whose feet Australia pours mines of liquid gold ..." In June 1917 she asked the gallery to pay for the bronze in advance: "I am certainly not going to have the panel cast in bronze until the money is in the bank with which to pay the founder ...".

There was also an artistic disagreement. Ohlfsen wrote to Mann in October 1916 about the portraits of da Vinci and Michelangelo: "those two enormous heads will kill the importance of the principal panel". She wrote later: "You have not answered me as to my suggestions for the two end panels of one yard square. As I pointed out in a previous letter two large heads of Michelangelo and Leonardo da Vinci would be anachronisms as they don't belong to the Greek epoch of the panel. It is a Greek chariot race."

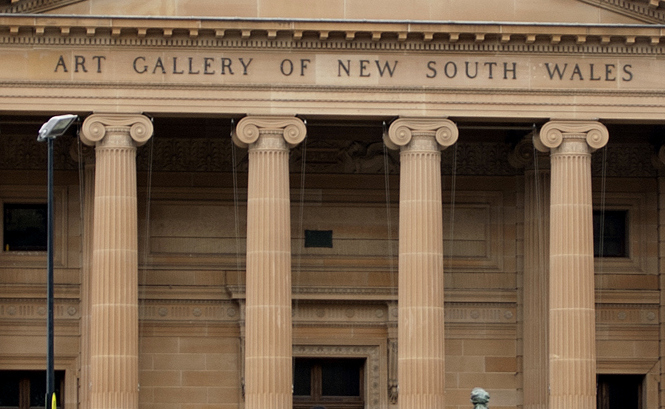
Empty space above the Art Gallery of New South Wales entrance, 2011

The cancellation came as a great shock to Ohlfsen, who feared it would damage her reputation; she wrote to F. Graham Lloyd, the gallery's London agent, in November 1919: "I cannot tell you how amazed I am, nor how incomprehensible it all seems to me nor how unexpected." She complained about it to William Holman, Premier of New South Wales, because in 1916 the gallery had spent £4,920 on two statues by Gilbert Bayes. To keep costs down, she suggested to the trustees that they install the plaster cast and paint it a bronze colour until bronze returned to its pre-war price. But the cancellation stood; the chair of the trustees, John Sulman, wrote to Mann in January 1920: "Miss Ohlfsen is a woman, and although she has no case, can cause mischief."

The space above the front entrance remained empty for over 100 years. In October 2019 the gallery opened an exhibition, Dora Ohlfsen and the façade commission (12 October 2019 – 8 March 2020) to explore the cancellation. Six female artists from New South Wales were asked to examine Ohlfsen's photographs and reflect on what to do with the space.

=== Anzac medal (1916) ===
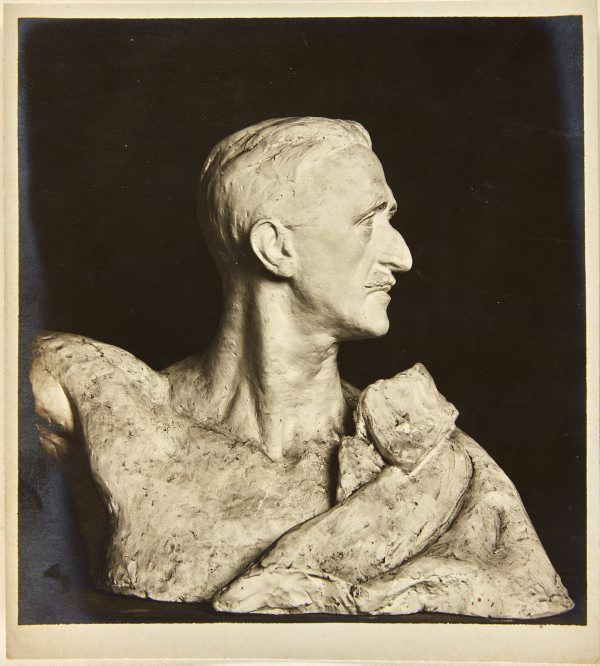
Plaster cast of Ohlfsen's life-size sculpture of her friend Colonel Duke Fulco Tosti di Valminuta (1915)

During World War I (1914–1918), Ohlfsen and Kuegelgen trained as Red Cross nurses. She wrote to Gother Mann of the Art Gallery of New South Wales:

There is a great need of nurses and now a branch of the English Red Cross Society has come to Rome and English women are asked & go through a Voluntary Aid course. Great preparations are being made for bringing English wounded to this country and one sees crowds of English, French and Serbian officers and soldiers about ... I also told you that when I first [contacted] Paris I found my founder was dead and my reducers for medals—all killed. The number of artists killed too is appalling.

In January 1915 she helped to nurse the injured during the Avezzano earthquake, and later worked in the Italian Auxiliary Hospital near her studio in Rome; photographs of her in her nurse's uniform were published in Australia. Art historian Juliette Peers noted that Ohlfsen's "anecdotes of life on the Italian front found a ready market amongst Australian journalists". Other artwork at this time included a medallion of her friend Colonel Duke Fulco Tosti di Valminuta.

Anzac medal
Obverse
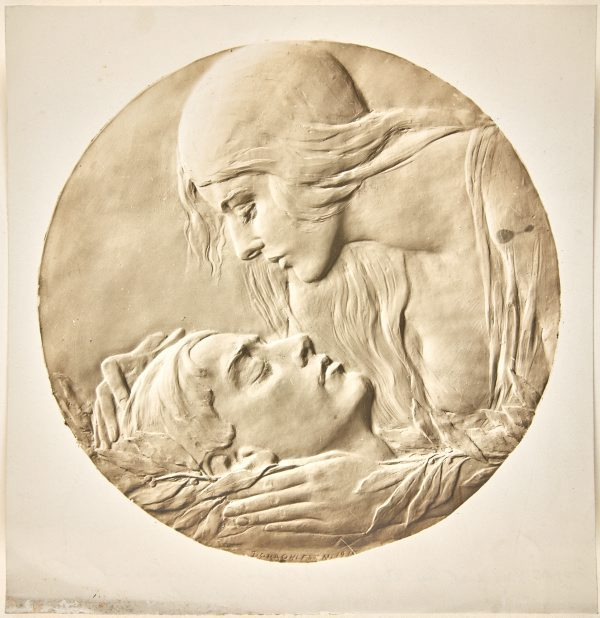
- Design: Australia placing a laurel wreath on the head of a fallen Anzac
- Design date: (Above) the plaster cast, designed in 1916; the medal was issued in 1919.
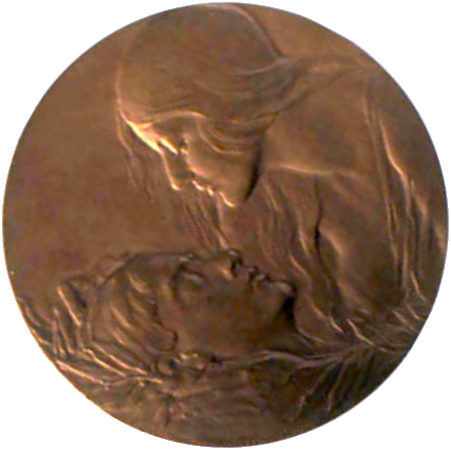

Reverse
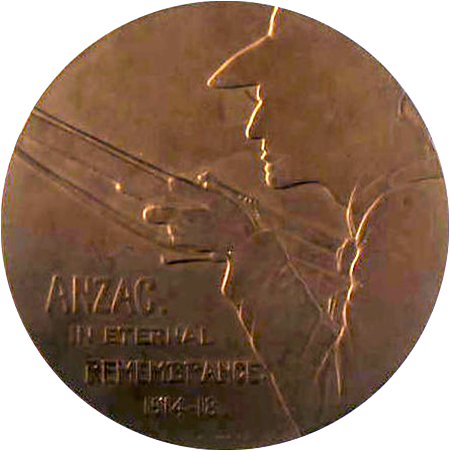

In October 1916 Ohlfsen created the work she is best known for in Australia, the Anzac Medallion, originally intended to help and commemorate members of the Australian and New Zealand Army Corps (Anzac) who took part in the Gallipoli campaign (1915–1916) during World War I. Sixty thousand Australian soldiers, out of an overall population of four million, died during the war. She told Mann that, although she had created it for Gallipoli, the medallion "could be dedicated to those fallen in this war in general. If it should be put to any use by the Government I should like half of the proceeds to go the mutilated." When it was issued in 1919, the original 1915–16 date range was changed to 1914–18.

The front of the medal depicts a young woman, who represents Australia, bending over a young man to place a laurel wreath on his head; the back, showing an Anzac soldier with a rifle, bears the inscription "Anzac. In Eternal Remembrance. 1914–18", and in smaller letters "Dora Ohlfsen 1916". The woman was based on 21-year-old Alexandra Simpson, who lived in Rome, the daughter of the British High Commissioner in China. Ohlfsen wrote to Mann: "I have made 'Australia' and her son very young—representing as they do the youngest country and the youngest army."

According to numismatics curator Ken Sheedy, the medal is "perhaps one of the most remarkable of all Australian commemorative medals ... distinguished by its skill and poignancy" from other World War I medals. Peers argued that the image of the soldier on the reverse, almost in silhouette, "avoided the usual over-literal depiction of men in uniform, which characterises the more pedantic medals that generally were produced in Australia during and after the war. The almost total emphasis on the outline of the figure allows [Ohlfsen] ... to consider the question of negative, as well as positive, space within the roundel suggesting ... how keenly she attended to the issue of designing for the medal format."

Ohlfsen apparently sold hundreds of the medals to Sir Charles Wade, Premier of New South Wales, so that he could sell them in Australia at two guineas each to raise money. They were sold in a box lined with silk and included the dedication "in aid of Australians and New Zealanders maimed in the War—1914–1918". Edward, Prince of Wales received the first medal, and Wade, along with Generals William Birdwood, John Monash, and Talbot Hobbs, joined a committee in 1919 to oversee the distribution. Ohlfsen wrote to the director of the Art Gallery of New South Wales in January 1917: "I am doing a series of medals on my own account to commemorate the war. One for Anzacs, which is finished, one for the Italians, one for the artists of the French Academy (Villa Medici) in Rome and one of the Russian Cavalry." She announced in July 1919 that she had completed one for the American airforce. Valued at £15 in 1978 in Seaby's Coin and Medal Bulletin, several Anzac medals are held in the Art Gallery of New South Wales, the Art Gallery of Ballarat, and the Australian War Memorial.

The Mornington Soldier's Memorial war in Mornington, Victoria, dedicated in 1925, features the front of Ohlfsen's Anzac image (the woman and the soldier) on a plaque set into the base of a large cross. Ohlfsen worked on the plaque in 1921 during her visit to Australia. Historian Ken Inglis wrote in 1987 that it was the only "war-memorial representation of Australia as a female" that he was aware of. A reporter at the unveiling ceremony assumed the woman was a nurse.

=== Visit to Sydney (1920–1922) ===
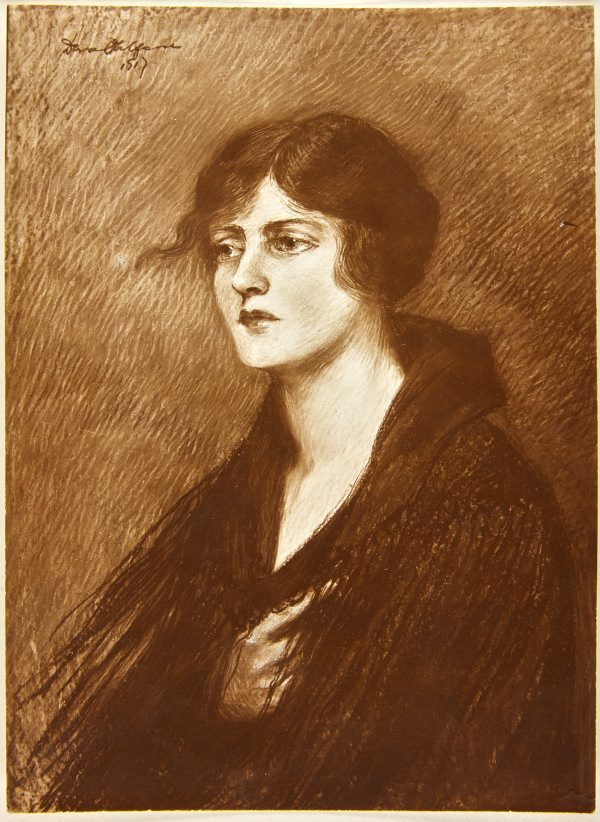
Mrs. Grey (1917), Ohlfsen's pastel portrait of Alexander Simpson, model for the Anzac medal

To promote sales of the Anzac Medal, Ohlfsen visited Australia in 1920 for the first time since 1913. She set up a studio in Sydney at 110 Bathurst Street, and Dame Margaret Davidson organized an exhibition of her work there. (Note: The Sands' Directory listed "Ohlfsen Miss Dora, artist" as having premises on the fifth floor of the Albert buildings, 110 Bathurst Street, Sydney, in 1921.) Exhibits included Mrs. Grey (1917), a painting of Alexandra Simpson, model for the Anzac medal; The Awakening of Australian Art; a pastel of the Austrian bombing of Venice; a small sculpture called the Blind Ardito (the Arditi were an Italian World War I elite unit); and medallion portraits of General Birdwood, David Lloyd George, H. H. Asquith, General Giuseppe Garibaldi II, Sir Charles Wade, William Holman, and Cardinal William Henry O'Connell. A writer who met her in 1922 described her as "[t]all and of one figure":

[A] commanding presence, and beautifully gowned, her finely moulded features suggested more the influence of her Polish father than of her English mother. The dark eyes held the inscrutable depths of the visionary, and, somehow, she reminded me irresistibly of Paderewski, a fellow countryman. Her exquisitely modulated voice unmistakably revealed an Italian accent.

Her other work at this time included medallions of Australian Prime Minister Billy Hughes (1921) and one of Robert Randolph Garran—Solicitor-General of Australia and an old friend of her father who acted as Ohlfsen's mentor— and a bust of Nellie Stewart (1922) that appeared in Women's World. She had apparently hoped during the visit to resolve the issue of the façade commission for the Art Gallery of New South Wales. In September 1920 she told the Sydney Sunday Times that the trustees were "waiting until bronze is cheaper to have it cast". The delay was inconvenient, she said, because she had been storing the plaster cast, 8 × 2 yards, in her studio in Rome for the last three years.

She considered staying in Australia—in June 1919 she had told Gother Mann that "the coming winter will be my last [in Rome]"—but having failed to reach the priorities she had set for herself, she returned to Rome, leaving Australia in February 1922 on the SS Orsova. Before she left, she gave a lecture on "Futuristic art in its relation to Bolshevism" at the Socialist Hall in Melbourne, calling futurism "the sweeping away of every canon of art in the academic sense in order to destroy the vices into which modern art had fallen".

=== Mussolini medallion (1922) ===
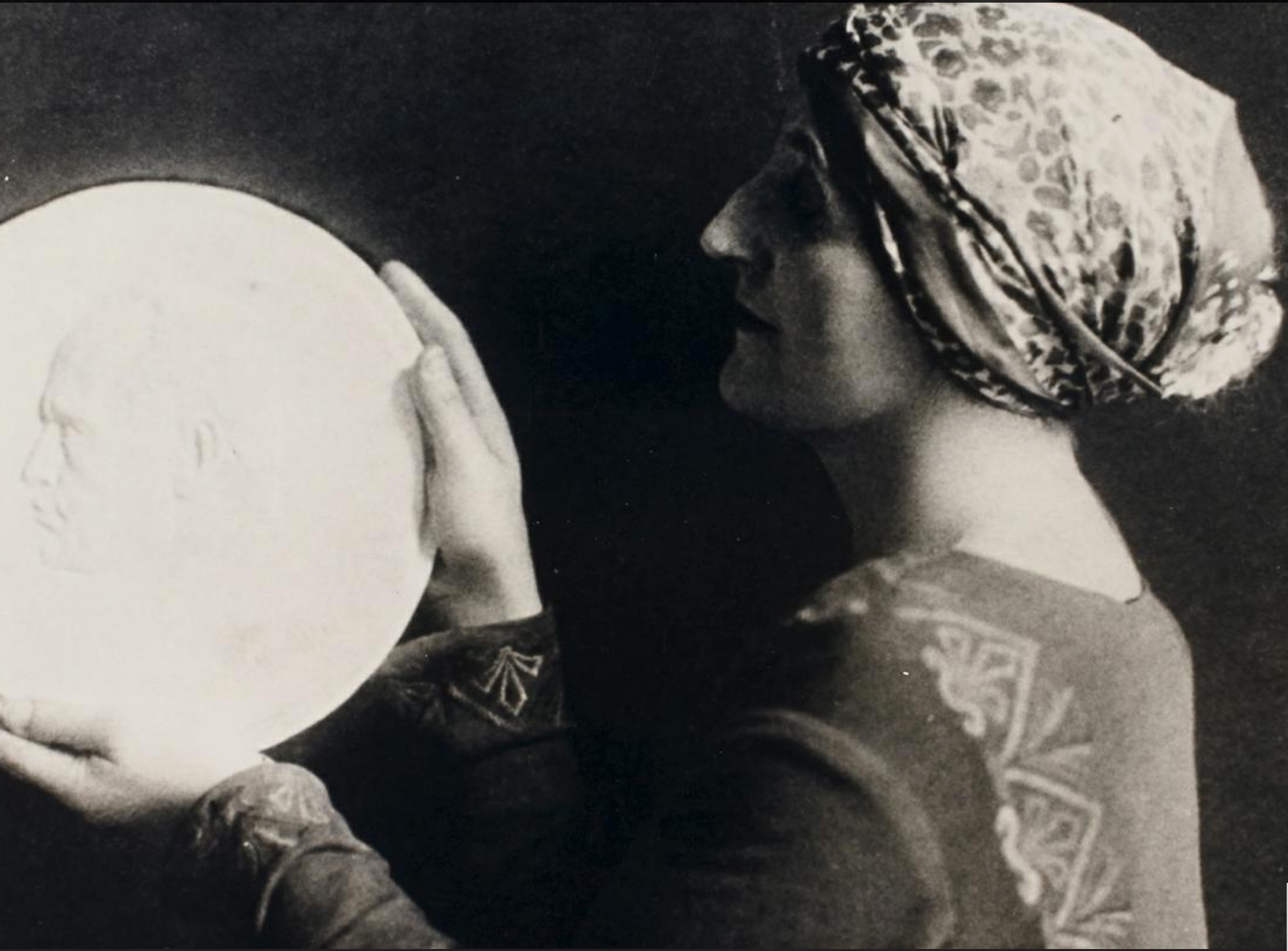

Mussolini medallion
Obverse
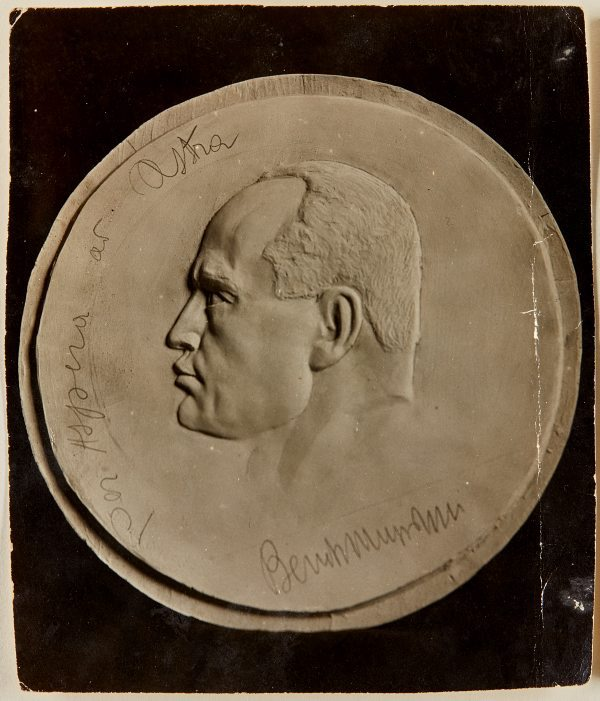
- Design: (Top) Ohlfsen holding her Mussolini medallion and (above) plaster cast of the medallion, signed by Mussolini and photographed by Ohlfsen in 1925.

Reverse
- Design: Unknown

In 1922 Ohlfsen was commissioned, by a man with mining interests in Italy, to create a medallion of Benito Mussolini, Prime Minister of Italy from October 1922 to July 1943. After apparently giving her two-hour sittings at the Palazzo Chigi while he worked, Mussolini signed the plaster cast and added the inscription "per ardua ad astra" (through adversity to the stars).

An early supporter of Mussolini and the National Fascist Party, Ohlfsen was in the crowd during the March on Rome on 30 October 1922 when the fascists took power. "We have been passing through many thrilling times here," she wrote to the Sydney Morning Herald in January 1923, "no less than a revolution with a king the head of it. ... At 1 pm I went down to the Café Aragno, on the Corso, with a party of friends. ... We stood on chairs there till 5:30, watching the Corteo march past. ... The Corteo was headed by Mussolini, and the entire procession composed of 100,000 Fascisti, marched past the tomb [of the unknown soldier], giving the Fascisti salute—raising the arm—as in the days of ancient Rome." She described Mussolini in 1925:

He is, indeed, a man quite above the ordinary, and positively exudes magnetism. He speaks French and German perfectly, and, beginning English last year, can already sustain a conversation in it. His beautiful voice when speaking is like a 'cello bowed by a great artist. I have modelled him wearing his 'dictator's' expression. His face changes with such swiftness and facility that I found I had to choose one aspect, and stick to it, awaiting a chance renewal. His sittings were during a very hectic period (which still continues), but he was always amazingly calm, insolent, and dominating. He promised that I should paint a futuristic picture of him later on.

The fascists became a source of many of her commissions. Ohlfsen was "strongly influenced by the cult of dynamic he-men forging history, in line with early Italian Fascism," Stella Free wrote in the Grove Dictionary of Art. "With modernist overtones, her art is a celebration of idealized figures in their prime, conveying patriotic themes and nationalistic sentiment."

=== Sacrifice (1926) ===
Formia war memorial

Sacrifice,
(Ministry of Cultural Heritage and Activities, undated).
Memorial in 2016.

In or around 1923, as a result of Ohlfsen's friendship with Duke Fulco Tosti di Valminuta, who had become an undersecretary in the Ministry of Foreign Affairs, the Italian government commissioned her to create a war memorial in Formia on the coast of Lazio. At the time she was reportedly the only woman in Italy and the only non-Italian to have been awarded such a commission. In February 1925 she told a correspondent that the work was completed, apart from finishing touches, and was being sent to Formia. Entitled Sacrifice, the 30-foot-tall sculpture consists of a young man, in bronze, standing on a white-marble pedestal with his arms outstretched; on the pedestal itself, holding a palm and a laurel branch, a woman inclines toward the names of those who died in World War I. The inscription, translated, reads "Oh, my country! The life thou gave me I return to thee." The unveiling in July 1926 in the Piazza della Vittoria was attended by General Armando Diaz; Ohlfsen was awarded the Freedom of the City and a silver shield. She described the ceremony in a letter:

Thousands were present; the entire province, Commandants of the fifth Army Corps and of the Navy; Minister of Public Instruction (Signor Fidele) for the Government. While the benediction was being pronounced by the Archbishop of Gaeta, the school children sang very softly the Song of the Brave, while the gunboats in the bay fired the salute. ... During the entire ceremony, until the flag dropped, a Fascist stood on top of the monument behind the bronze soldier on guard, and from 8 o'clock in the morning the guard round the monument was relieved by Carbineers, Fascists and military figures. ... Afterwards, the freedom of the city was conferred on me, and the Commander of the Fascists sprang up on the table, at which the press were seated and shouted, "Dora Ohlfsen, Alala!" and all the Fascists shouted the same words, and gave me the Roman salute, to which I answered, and then all the bands burst into Giovenezza. All the war widows and war orphans then came forward and thanked me for calling the soldier 'Sacrifice'".

Chanin and Miller write that Ohlfsen's "choice of bronze and marble for her monument, the decorative band of fasci at the top of the support and her coupling of masculine sacrifice with feminine nurturing fits well with the fascist agenda for sculpture, in its promotion of the myth of Italianiata. Vitalist notions popular the time probably also influenced the work. ... Interest in 'body culture' was a feature of the 1920s, with both communists and fascists emphasising physical fitness as a key to national regeneration." Mussolini reportedly told Ohlfsen: "you may now be considered an Italian sculptress." Reportedly to Ohlfsen's great distress, the Formia memorial was dismantled in 1941—deemed to be "of great historic and patriotic value, but not of great artistic worth"—but it was restored in 2008.

Ohlfsen was highly critical of the Anzac Memorial in Hyde Park, Sydney, which was completed in 1934. She wrote in a letter: "I'm perfectly shocked at the war memorial they have erected in Sydney done by stonemasons I hear.... you will note that the nature of the scaled soldiers in a row is nothing but an illustration of 'Latrine Parade' so much described in all the war books. Added to that people write to me that there is to be a centrepiece of a naked woman strung up on a cross!! And the authors of this abomination have the effrontery to call it 'Sacrifice' stealing the title of my war memorial in Formia?"

=== Later work ===
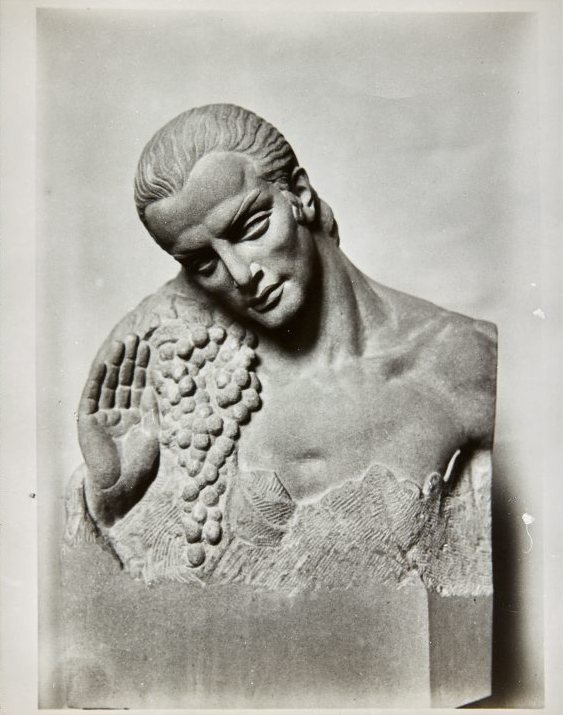
Ohlfsen's Dionysus (1930s)

In 1930 Ohlfsen was invited, along with other artists, to submit sketches for sculptures for the inner shrine of Melbourne's Shrine of Remembrance. Asked to sketch Charity and Love, she was disappointed, calling the invitation "this crumb". In the end, the memorial committee chose other work and her idea didn't progress beyond a plaster cast. Robert Randolph Garran, the former Solicitor-General who became her friend and mentor, had suggested her to a group that was organizing the memorial. "I have the most glorious idea you can conceive of for the Canberra War Memorial but do not dare to tell you," she wrote to him in January 1932. "These are very hard times for me and I simply have not got the money to go to Australia unless it is for something definite. ... Supposing I had the money available (it is not a question of a mere steamer ticket) and went to Australia and after a heart-breaking fight did not get the work I would be so smashingly disappointed that I would be quite capable of killing myself!"

Visitors to Rome still called in at Ohlfsen's studio on the Via di S. Nicola da Tolentino. (Note: According to one visitor, the studio was next door to the Beda College, which moved to the Via di S. Nicola da Tolentino in 1922.) Writing in the Sydney Morning Herald in 1935, Huntly McCrae Cowper described "a big room high up in a corner with long windows looking down into narrow streets on either side. As we came in I felt that I was in a crowd of silent people. All round us were figures in bronze and marble, some shrouded in calico, looking like ghosts in fading light.

When Mary Jay, a Sydney writer, visited in 1933, the chariot-race plaster cast created for the Art Gallery of New South Wales was hanging on the wall, and the room was full of sculptures: gardens and fountains, a relief of the Greek god Dionysus in grey stone, several in pink marble, and a mural of Anthony of Padua with Australian flowers; Ohlfsen was working on another of Francis of Assisi with Australian birds. "There are divans and cosy corners, where a glass of Italian vermouth and a cigarette may be enjoyed by the favoured; there are also screens behind which we may not venture, and the whole place has an atmosphere of artistic mystery—very Italian looking and charming." Ohflsen she described as "tall and graceful with remarkable hands. While working she swathes her head in a coloured kerchief, which hides her pretty hair."

== Death ==
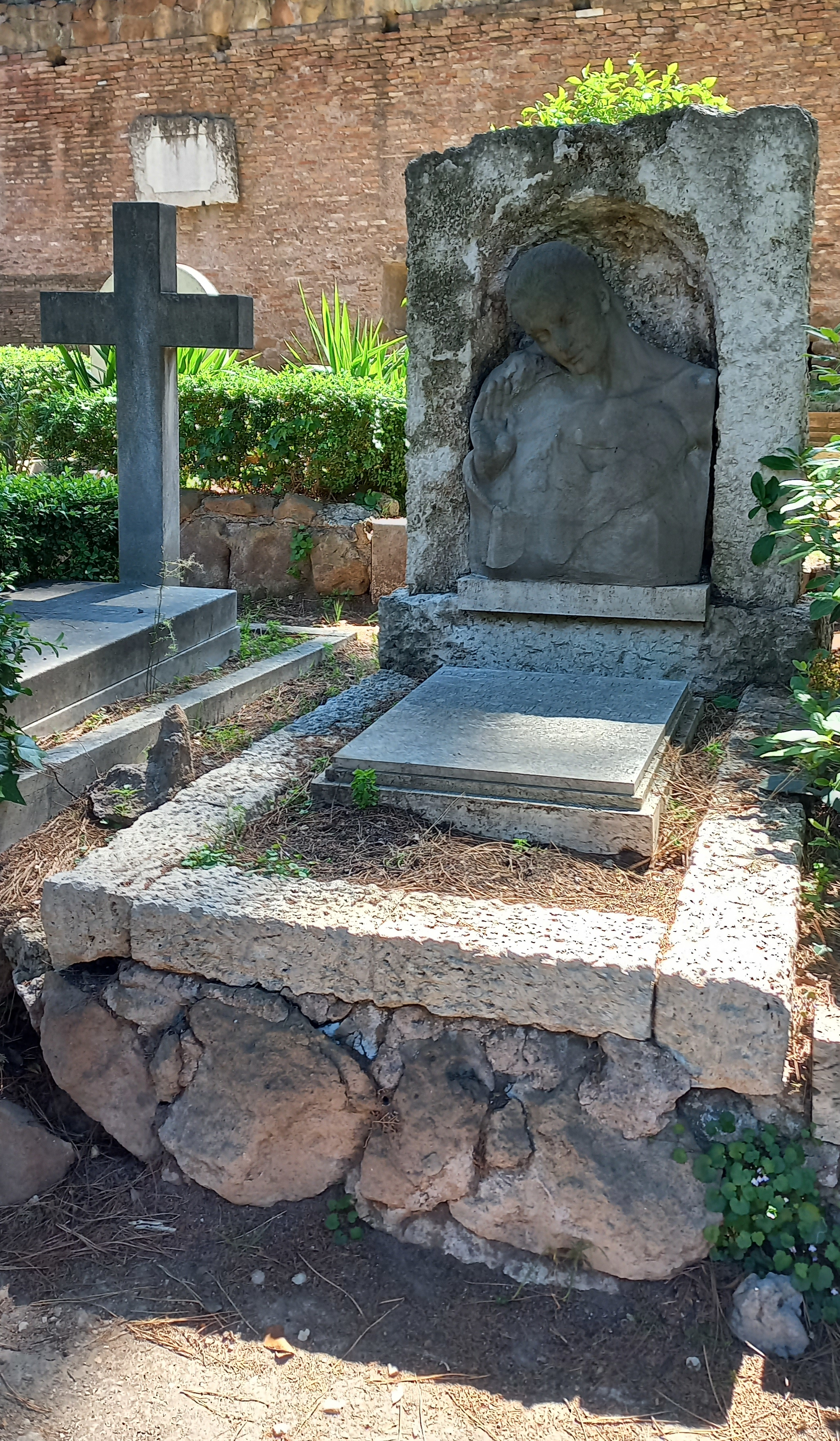
Ohlfsen and Kuegelgen's grave, Cimitero Acattolico, Rome.

Little was heard from Ohlfsen during World War II (1939–1945). In October 1940 her name was included in a list of Australians who had been denied permission to leave Italy, a list released by Australia's Minister for External Affairs. Reportedly distressed by the dismantling of the Formia war memorial in 1941, she had been left without work by the fall of the fascists, the source of many of her commissions. The protecting powers gave her some kind of assistance during the war, after which she and Kuegelgen apparently had to finance themselves by selling their belongings.

On 7 February 1948 the women were found dead as a result of a gas leak in their apartment on Via di S. Nicola da Tolentino. The police declared the deaths an accident, but there was inevitably speculation that it was suicide. "To the end," Peers wrote, "[Ohlfsen] maintained the sense of the dramatic that she had always cultivated." According to Miller, her studio was packed up by friends, and the contents have not been traced. The women were buried together at Cimitero Acattolico, the non-Catholic cemetery in Rome, in zone 1, row 15, plot 28, tomb number 1091. Ohlfsen's relief of Dionysus sits on the tombstone, which reads in Italian:

- Dora Ohlfsen Bagge
- Australiana per nascita
- Italiana di cuore
- E per benemeranze nella guerra 1915–1918
- Musicista pittrice scultrice insigne
- Baronessa Helene de Kuegelgen
- Ricca di filantropiche virtù
- Anime elette – Amiche inseparabili
- Trovarono assieme l'eterno riposo
- Il 7 febbraio 1948
- Nell'ultima espressione di un'amicizia
- Più forte della morte
- Signore, dona loro la pace dei buoni!
- Dora Ohlfsen Bagge
- Australian by birth
- Italian by heart
- And for benevolence in the 1915–1918 war
- Famous sculptor painter musician
- Baroness Helene De Kuegelgen
- Rich of philanthropic virtue
- Elected souls – Inseparable friends
- They found together the eternal rest
- On 7 February 1948
- In the last expression of a friendship
- Stronger than death
- Lord, give them the peace of the good!

== Collections ==
Ohlfsen's work is held in:

- Australia: Australian War Memorial, National Library of Australia, and National Gallery of Australia in Canberra; the Art Gallery of New South Wales, Powerhouse Museum, and University of Sydney in Sydney; the National Museum of Victoria in Melbourne; and the Art Gallery of Ballarat.
- France: the Petit Palais in Paris.
- United Kingdom: the British Museum in London, the University of Glasgow, and the National Library of Wales in Aberystwyth.

== Posthumous exhibitions ==
- Through Women's Eyes, Australian War Memorial, Canberra, 30 July 1994 – 30 June 1995.
- Beyond the Picket Fence: Australian women's art in the National Library collections, National Library of Australia, Canberra, 8 March 1995 – 8 June 1995.
- Review: Speaking of Women, Art Gallery of New South Wales, Sydney, 8 March 1995 – 8 June 1995.
- Dora Ohlfsen and the façade commission, Art Gallery of New South Wales, Sydney, 12 October 2019 – March 2020.

== Selected works ==
=== Medallions ===
- Hélène de Kuegelgen (c. 1903), lead, lost.
- Mary Anderson (1906), silver, extant.
- Nellie Melba (1906).
- Mother and child (1906), bronze, extant.
- Mattia Battistini (1906), lost.
- Solomiya Krushelnytska (1906), lost.
- The Awakening of Australian Art (1907), "struck bronze, 50 mm", extant.
- Femminismo (c. 1908), lost.
- Mrs. Harry Aspinwall (c. 1908).
- Gabriele d'Annunzio (1909), bronze, extant.
- Cardinal William Henry O'Connell of Boston (1911), bronze, extant.
- Josef Altenweisel, Prince-Bishop of Brixen (c. 1911).
- Frederic Thesiger, 1st Viscount Chelmsford (1912), extant.
- Sir James Oswald Fairfax (1912).
- The Plough (by 1912).
- Two Little Roman Beggars (by 1912).
- Orpheus (by 1912).
- Princess Maria Rospigliosi (by 1912).
- Illusions (by 1912).
- Clara Louise Kellogg (by 1912)
- Jarvie Hood (c. 1912), extant.
- Sir Henry Normand MacLaurin (c. 1912), bronze, extant.
- Edmund Barton (c. 1912), extant.
- Adrian Knox (c. 1912), extant.
- Goethe (c. 1913), lost.
- Shakespeare (c. 1913), lost.
- Lady King-Hall, Lady Mayoress of Sydney, wife of Mayor Arthur Cocks (c. 1914).
- Anzac Medal (1916), bronze.
- Medal for the American airforce (1919).
- David Lloyd George (1919), bronze, extant.
- H. H. Asquith (1919), bronze, extant.
- General Sir William Birdwood (1919).
- General Giuseppe Garibaldi II (1919).
- Sir Charles Wade, premier of New South Wales.
- Sir Walter Davidson (1920), bronze.
- Dame Margaret Davidson (1920), bronze.
- George Mounsey (by 1920), bronze.
- Billy Hughes, Australian prime minister (1921), extant.
- Robert Randolph Garran (1921).
- Donald Grant (by 1921).
- Benito Mussolini (1922), bronze.
- Premier Holden, bronze, Powerhouse Museum, Sydney, extant.
- Clara Butt (by 1924)

Herbert M Moran of Sydney. Roma MCMXXXIX. xvii

=== Sculptures ===
- l'Autunno / Autumn (1907).
- The Pitcher goes to the fountain (c. 1909), a nude, lost.
- Ceres (1910), bronze relief, purchased by the Art Gallery of New South Wales in 1912.
- Le septième voile (1911), a nude, lost.
- Passion (c. 19111), a nude, tin relief.
- Dawn (by 1912), a nude, lost.
- Spring (date unknown), a nude, lost.
- Salome (date unknown), a nude, lost.
- Chief Justice William Cullen (c. 1912).
- Tablet about James Cook's and Joseph Banks's discoveries in 1821; four bas reliefs of men (1912–1913).
- Art Gallery of New South Wales chariot race plaster cast (1913–1917), lost.
- Duke Fulco Tosti di Valminuta (c. 1915), marble, lost.
- Mrs. Piercy (1916), lost.
- Head of Australia (1917), plaster cast, lost.
- New Aphrodite (c. 1918), a nude, lost.
- Eve Balfour (c. 1919).
- The Blind Ardito (c. 1917), lost.
- The Good Shepherd (c. 1920), bronze, lost.
- Nellie Stewart (1922), pink marble.
- Sacrificio (1926), bronze and white marble, the Formia war memorial, removed 1941, restored 2008.
- Papuan Daughter (c. 1927), a nude, lost.
- Cosacco del Kuban (1929), "waxed gesso", lost.
- Dionysus (c. 1930), plaster.
- The Madonna (1930s).
- Prince Emanuele Filiberto, Duke of Aosta (by 1931).
- Primavera
- The Marchesa di Seta
- Guardian Angel, pink marble.
- Saint Joseph (c. 1935).

=== Paintings ===
- Mrs. Grey (1917), pastel of Alexander Simpson, the Anzac model.
- Lilian Earp
- Bobbie Macmillan (c. 1920), pastel.
- Austrian bombing of Venice, pastel, lost.
- Anthony of Padua (c. 1933).
- Francis of Assisi (c. 1933).

== Sources ==
=== Works cited ===
Newspapers and websites are cited in the References section only.

- Chanin, Eileen; Miller, Steven (2015). Awakening: Four lives in art. Mile End, South Australia: Wakefield Press. ISBN 978-1-74305-365-2. OCLC 902750805.
- Cheever, Susan (2011). Louisa May Alcott: A Personal Biography. New York: Simon and Schuster. ISBN 9781416569916. OCLC 688513136.
- Edwards, Deborah (1995). "Ohlfsen Bagge (Ohlfsen), Dorothea (Dora)". In Kerr, Joan (ed.). Heritage: The National Women's Art Book: 500 Works by 500 Australian Women Artists from Colonial Times to 1955. East Roseville, NSW: G+B Arts International. p. 420. ISBN 978-9766410452. OCLC 32438124.
  Also published as Edwards, Deborah (25 February 2015). "Dora Ohlfsen-Bagge b. 22 August 1869: Biography". Design & Art Australia Online.
- Englefield, Dermot, J. T.; Seaton, Janet; White, Isobel (1995). Facts about the British Prime Ministers. New York: H. W. Wilson Co.
- Free, Stella (1 December 2004). "Ohlfsen-Bagge, (Adele) Dora". Grove Art Online. doi:10.1093/gao/9781884446054.article.T097836.
- Hutton, Laurence (1897). Literary Landmarks of Rome. New York: Harpers & Brothers Publishers. OCLC 1007252427.
- Huemer, Christina (2005). Spellbound by Rome. Rome: Palombi & Partner. ISBN 9788876214929. OCLC 978098895.
- Inglis, Ken (Fall 1987). "Men, Women, and War Memorials: Anzac Australia". Daedalus. 116 (4: Learning about Women: Gender, Politics, and Power): 35–59.
- Inglis, K. S.; Brazier, Jan (2008) [1998]. Sacred Places: War Memorials in the Australian Landscape. Carlton, Victoria: Melbourne University Press. ISBN 978-0522854794. OCLC 963680597.
- Jones, Mark (1979). The Art of the Medal. London: British Museum Publications. ISBN 978-0714108506. OCLC 570475565.
- Kiers, Dorothy (1972). "Harrison, John (1802–1869)". In Pike, Douglas (ed.). Australian Dictionary of Biography. Vol. 4. Carlton, Victoria: Melbourne University Press. ISBN 0-522-84034-5. OCLC 612996569.
- Miller, Steven (Winter 2013). "Dora Ohlfsen: Australian by birth, Italian at heart (from the inscription on her tomb" (PDF). Newsletter (25). Friends of the Non-Catholic Cemetery in Rome: 1–2. Archived (PDF) from the original on 13 October 2019.
  Also published as "Dora Ohlfsen: 'Australiana per nascita, Italiana di cuore' (dall'iscrizione sulla sua tomba)" (PDF). Newsletter (25). Amici del Cimitero Acattolico di Roma: 1–2. 2013. Archived (PDF) from the original on 11 October 2017.
- Mitchell, Ann (1986). "MacLaurin, Sir Henry Normand (1835–1914)". Australian Dictionary of Biography. Vol. 10. Carlton, Victoria: Melbourne University Press.
- Murphy, Kerry (2017). "Henri Kowalski (1841–1916): A French Musician in Colonial Australia". Australian Historical Studies. 48 (3): 346–362. doi:10.1080/1031461X.2017.1329327. S2CID 164706895.
- Peers, Juliette (1992). "A Rare and Difficult Art: The Career of the Australian Medallist Dora Ohlfsen". The Medal. 21. British Art Metal Society: 40–43.
- Pesman, Ros (1996) [1995]. Duty Free: Australian Women Abroad. Melbourne: Oxford University Press. ISBN 978-0195536393. OCLC 832501910.
- Rusconi, Arturo Jahn (June 1907). "L'Esposizione di Belle Arti in Roma". Emporium. XXV: 405–420.
- Rusconi, Arturo Jahn (10 March 1908). "Un'artista della medaglia". Rivista di Roma. XII (V): 148–150.
- Scarlett, Ken (1980) [1979]. Australian Sculptors. West Melbourne: Thomas Nelson. ISBN 978-0170052924. OCLC 741951982.
- Sheedy, K. A. (August 1989). "Dora Ohlfsen – the Forgotten Heroine of Australian Medallic Art". Australian Coin Review. 132: 18–21.
- Speck, Catherine (August 1996). "Women's war memorials and citizenship". Australian Feminist Studies. 11 (23): 129–145. doi:10.1080/08164649.1996.9994810.
- Speck, Catherine (20 February 2018). "Books reviews. Awakening: four lives in art". Journal of Australian Studies. 42 (1): 134–136. doi:10.1080/14443058.2018.1426337. S2CID 148906389.
