= Alaphilippe =

Alaphilippe is a French surname. Notable people with the surname include:

- Bryan Alaphilippe (born 1995), French cyclist, brother of Julian
- Camille Alaphilippe (1874 – after 1934), French sculptor
- Julian Alaphilippe (born 1992), French cyclist
