= Medal for Victims of the Invasion =

Medal for victims of the invasion
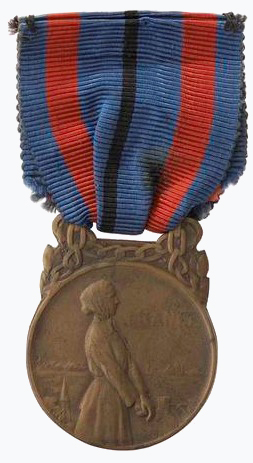
- Bronze grade - obverse
- Type: Commemorative Medal
- Awarded for: Mistreated civilians in territories occupied by the enemy
- Presented by: France
- Eligibility: French citizens
- Status: No longer awarded
- Established: 30 June 1921
- Ribbon of the Medal for victims of the invasion

During the war of 1914-1918, the populations of the invaded and occupied regions of France were put under severe strain. Thus, at the end of hostilities, it seemed necessary to pay tribute to the courage of these people by rewarding them with several medals such as the Medal for victims of the invasion, the Medal of French Fidelity and the Medal for civilian prisoners, deportees and hostages of the 1914-1918 Great War. It was on the proposal of the Minister for the Liberated Regions that the Medal for victims of the invasion (French: Médaille des victimes de l'invasion) was created on 30 June 1921 in three classes (bronze, silver and silver gilt).

The Medal of the Victims of the Invasion thanked and distinguished the war hostages, and persons deported outside of France, imprisoned by the enemy or condemned to forced labour.

Among the civilian victims of the war who were awarded the medal under the original conditions, two categories of persons were recognized to have the right to special recognition by the country.

On the one hand, political prisoners condemned by the German authorities to severe punishment for their attachment to France and, on the other hand, hostages of war who for months, sometimes years, remained in retaliation camps in Poland and Lithuania, exposed to the worst suffering and the most cruel privations. It is to point out this double category of citizens to the respectful attention of their compatriots, that two clasps were authorized for wear on the medal ribbon "POLITICAL PRISONERS" and "WAR HOSTAGES"

== Award statute ==
The Medal for victims of the invasion was awarded in three classes, the 1st class in silver gilt, 2nd class in silver and 3rd class in bronze. It was awarded to French citizens from the occupied regions who served as war hostages, were deported or used as forced labourers. A further decree recognized victims of brutality and serious abuse.

All recipients also receive a scroll attesting to the presentation of the medal.

== Award description ==
The Medal for victims of the invasion is a 30 mm in diameter circular medal struck in bronze, silvered bronze, silver or gilt silver. Its obverse, by engraver Pierre Dautel, bears the relief image of the right profile of a woman wearing a scarf, her hands bound in front of her, looking skywards. The reverse bears the relief inscription on six lines "AUX" "VICTIMES" "DE" "L’INVASION" "LA FRANCE" "RECONNAISSANTE" (TO THE VICTIMS OF THE INVASION A GRATEFUL FRANCE) surrounded by a laurel wreath along the entire outer circumference except for the bottom where the years "1914-1918" can be found. The rectangular suspension loop, affixed atop the medal, bore the relief image of chains.

The medal hangs from a 36 mm wide silk moiré navy blue ribbon with a 2 mm wide black central stripe and two 5 mm wide red stripes located 5 mm from the outer edges. The ribbon of the medal 1st class bears a rosette in the colours of the ribbon.

Two clasps could be worn on the ribbon:

- OTAGES DE GUERRE (WAR HOSTAGES)
- PRISONNIERS POLITIQUES (POLITICAL PRISONERS)

== Notable recipients (partial list) ==
- Monsignor Maurice Laverseyn (3rd class)

== See also ==
- German occupation of north-east France during World War I
- Western Front (World War I)
- Alsace-Lorraine
