= Formia War Memorial =

Coordinates: 41.255405869°N 13.606292915°E

Formia War Memorial (Italian: monumento ai caduti di Formia) is an Italian war memorial erected in 1926 to commemorate the dead of the First World War and earlier conflicts. It stands in the Piazza della Vittoria, in the centre of Formia, a town on the coast of the Province of Latina beside the Tyrrhenian Sea, about 150 km (93 mi) southeast of Rome and 100 km (62 mi) northwest of Naples

The 5.7 m (19 ft) high structure comprises a monumental bronze statue mounted on a tall white marble pedestal, standing on a plinth with two steps. The bronze statue entitled Sacraficio depicts a soldier, larger than life size, wearing an Adrian helmet, and trousers with puttees and boots, but bare-chested, standing with both arms raised, as if offering himself in sacrifice. The pedestal has a carved decorative frieze around its top edge, and the front has a carving of a female figure bearing a palm frond and holding a laurel branch over a dedicatory inscription "AI CADUTI / PER LA INDIPENDENZA E LA GRANDEZZA DELLA PATRIA // FORMIA / ORGOGLIOSA E RICCONOSCENTE" ("To the fallen / for the independence and greatness of the fatherland // Formia / proud and recognising").

On the rear are the inscriptions "DORA OHLFSEN / SCULTRICE / 1924" and two lines from the 1818 poem All'Italia ("To Italy") by the poet Giacomo Leopardi: "ALMA TERRA NATIA, / LA VITA CHE MI DESTI ECCO TI RENDO" ("Dear land of my birth, / The life you gave to me here I give back."). The sides are inscribed with the names of 120 war dead from Formia, killed in the First World War and earlier conflicts, including the Battle of Lissa (1866), the Battle of Adwa (1896), and the Italo-Turkish War (1911–12)

The Australian sculptor Dora Ohlfsen-Bagge (1869–1948) received a commission from the Italian government to create the sculpture around 1923, reportedly due to her friendship with Duke Fulco Tosti di Valminuta (1874–1939). It is claimed that she was the only woman in Italy and the only non-Italian to have been awarded such a commission. She first completed a plaster model, which was then cast in bronze, reportedly using bronze from captured guns, and completed around February 1925. The model for the bronze statue may have been Fulco's son Luigi Tosti di Valminuta (1871–1958).

The memorial was unveiled on Sunday 18 July 1926, at a ceremony attended by the Italian government minister Pietro Fedele, Marshal Armando Diaz, Admirals Diego Simonetti and Giuseppe Sirianni, the Archbishop of Gaeta, war veterans, and a large crowd of spectators. An Italian navy vessel in the harbour fired a salute. The strong masculine sculpture was considered a fitting commemorative work by the Fascist government of Benito Mussolini.

There was suggestion that the statue should be removed in the Second World War, so the bronze could be reused in the war effort, as despite the work's historical and patriotic value, it was said to have little artistic value. In the event, the memorial remained in place. It was restored in 2008.
