= Medal for civilian prisoners, deportees and hostages of the 1914–1918 Great War =

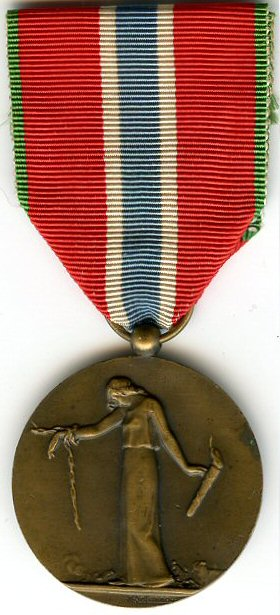
- Medal for civilian prisoners, deportees and hostages of the 1914-1918 Great War (obverse)
- Type: Commemorative Medal
- Awarded for: Internment during World War I
- Presented by: France
- Eligibility: French citizens
- Status: No longer awarded
- Established: 14 March 1936
- Final award: 1 February 1958

Highlights
- Total: ~10,400
- Ribbon of the Medal for civilian prisoners, deportees and hostages of the 1914-1918 Great War

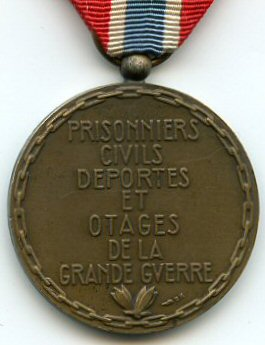
Reverse of the Medal for civilian prisoners, deportees and hostages of the 1914–1918 Great War

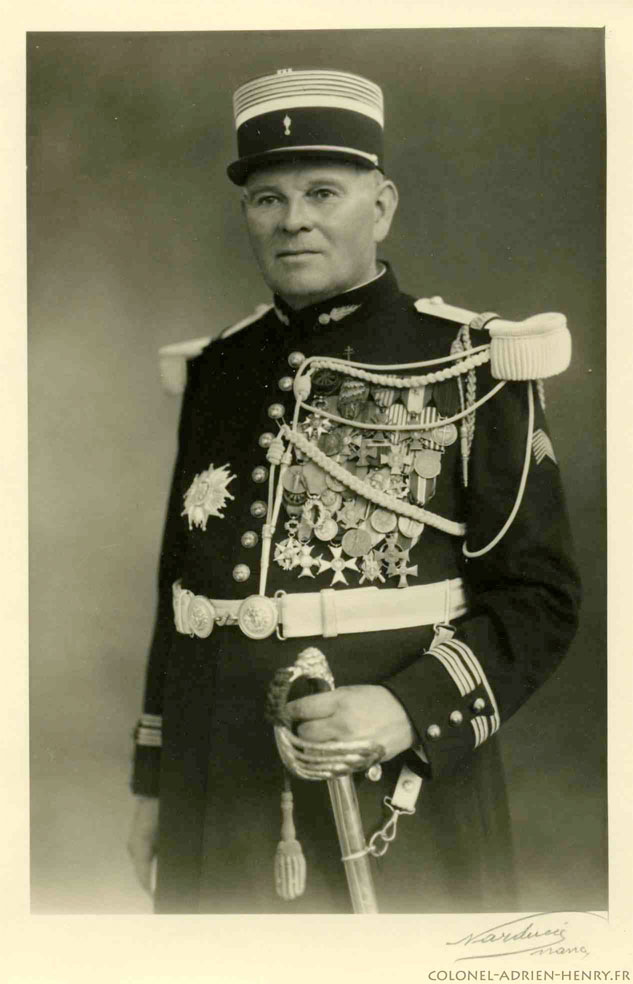
Adrien Henry, a recipient of the medal

The Medal for civilian prisoners, deportees and hostages of the 1914–1918 Great War (French: Médaille des prisonniers civils, déportés et otages de la Grande Guerre 1914–1918) was a commemorative medal awarded to French civilians who were deported from the German occupied French territories and interned in camps during World War I. A law of 14 March 1936 announced the government's intention to officially recognize the sacrifices and patriotism of the French civilians that were forced from their homes and into prison camps to serve as hostages or to be detained with a new medal. The law of 25 August 1936 officially established the award.

== Award statute ==
The Medal for civilian prisoners, deportees and hostages of the 1914–1918 Great War was awarded to the inhabitants of all the regions invaded by the enemy, including those from the Upper-Rhine, Lower-Rhine and Moselle regions, deported civilian prisoners, brought as hostages or interned in concentration camps.

The medal may be awarded posthumously for the civilian prisoners that were killed or that died of wounds received or from privations endured during their internment.

Are excluded of the right to receive the Medal for civilian prisoners, deportees and hostages of the 1914–1918 Great War, all those who, at any time, before or after the war, were the subject of a condemnation for acts qualified as crimes by the penal code or by the code of military justice.

== Award description ==
The Medal for civilian prisoners, deportees and hostages of the 1914–1918 Great War was a 32 mm in diameter circular medal struck from bronze. Its obverse bore the relief image of a woman walking slowly, her head lowered, being led away by her chained right wrist, her left hand dropping a torch symbolizing the home she must abandon. The reverse bore the relief inscription on seven lines "PRISONNIERS" "CIVILS" "DÉPORTÉS" "ET" "OTAGES" "DE LA" "GRANDE GUERRE" (English: "Deported Civilian Prisoners and Hostages of the Great War") over two closed flowers and surrounded by the circular relief image of a chain along the medal's circumference.

The medal hung by a ribbon passing through a ring itself passing through the medal's ball shaped suspension loop. The 32 mm wide red silk moiré ribbon had a 5 mm wide central blue stripe bordered on each side by 2 mm wide white stripes, 1 mm green stripes ran along the ribbon edges.

== Noteworthy recipients (partial list) ==
- Colonel Adrien Henry
- World War II French Resistance member Alphonse Fercot
