= Ros Pesman =

Australian historian

Ros Pesman AM FAHA
- Born: Roslyn Louise Cooper; 24 June 1938 (age 88); Leeton, New South Wales, Australia

Academic background
- Education: University of Sydney (BA); University of London (PhD)
- Thesis: Piero Soderini, Gonfaloniere a Vita of Florence 1502–1512 (1965)

Academic work
- Discipline: Historian
- Institutions: University of Sydney

Roslyn Louise "Ros" Pesman, AM FAHA (née Cooper; born 24 June 1938) was the first female Challis Professor of History at the University of Sydney and the first woman to be elected chair of the academic board at the university.

== Early life and family ==
Roslyn Cooper was born in Leeton, New South Wales, on 24 June 1938 to Robert Hewitson Cooper and Dulcie May Butler. She attended the MLC School, Burwood, graduating in 1956, going on to receive a Bachelor of Arts in history at the University of Sydney in 1959 and a Doctor of Philosophy in 1965 from the University of London, where she was the junior fellow of the Warburg Institute from 1963–65. Her thesis was on the Italian Gonfaloniere and statesman, Piero Soderini, entitled Piero Soderini, Gonfaloniere a Vita of Florence 1502–1512. She married Albert Pesman in London in 1964; they have two daughters and one son.

== Career ==
In 1966, Pesman was appointed lecturer in history at the University of Sydney and promoted to professor in 1996, becoming the fifth Challis Professor of History in 2003, and the first female. Previous Challis Chairs of History had been George Arnold Wood, Stephen Roberts, John Manning Ward and Deryck Schreuder. A scholar of the social and political elites of Renaissance Florence, Pesman published a number of works in this field. However, family, teaching and administrative duties limited her capacity to undertake sustained research in Italian archives and she devoted more time to projects within Australia, leading research in fields such as Italian migration to Australia and Australian travel and tourism. She was appointed a fellow of the Australian Academy of the Humanities in 2002, later serving as its vice-president from 2005–06, served as president of the Australian Historical Association from 2004–06 and in 2010 she was awarded the History Council of New South Wales Annual History Citation for services to the discipline.

She was appointed chair of the History Department in 1989 and oversaw the centenary celebrations of the department in 1991. In 1995 she became acting principal of the Sydney Conservatorium of Music at University of Sydney. She was elected chair of the University of Sydney of Sydney Academic Board in 1997, the first woman to hold this role. In 1999 she was appointed pro vice-chancellor of the College of Humanities and Social Sciences, one of the then three main faculty groupings at the university. She retired four years later, becoming Emeritus Professor in 2005.

Pesman was made a Member of the Order of Australia (AM) in the 2012 Australia Day Honours for "service to tertiary education through academic and administrative roles, particularly the study of the history of Italian migrants in Australia, and to the community".

== Selected works ==
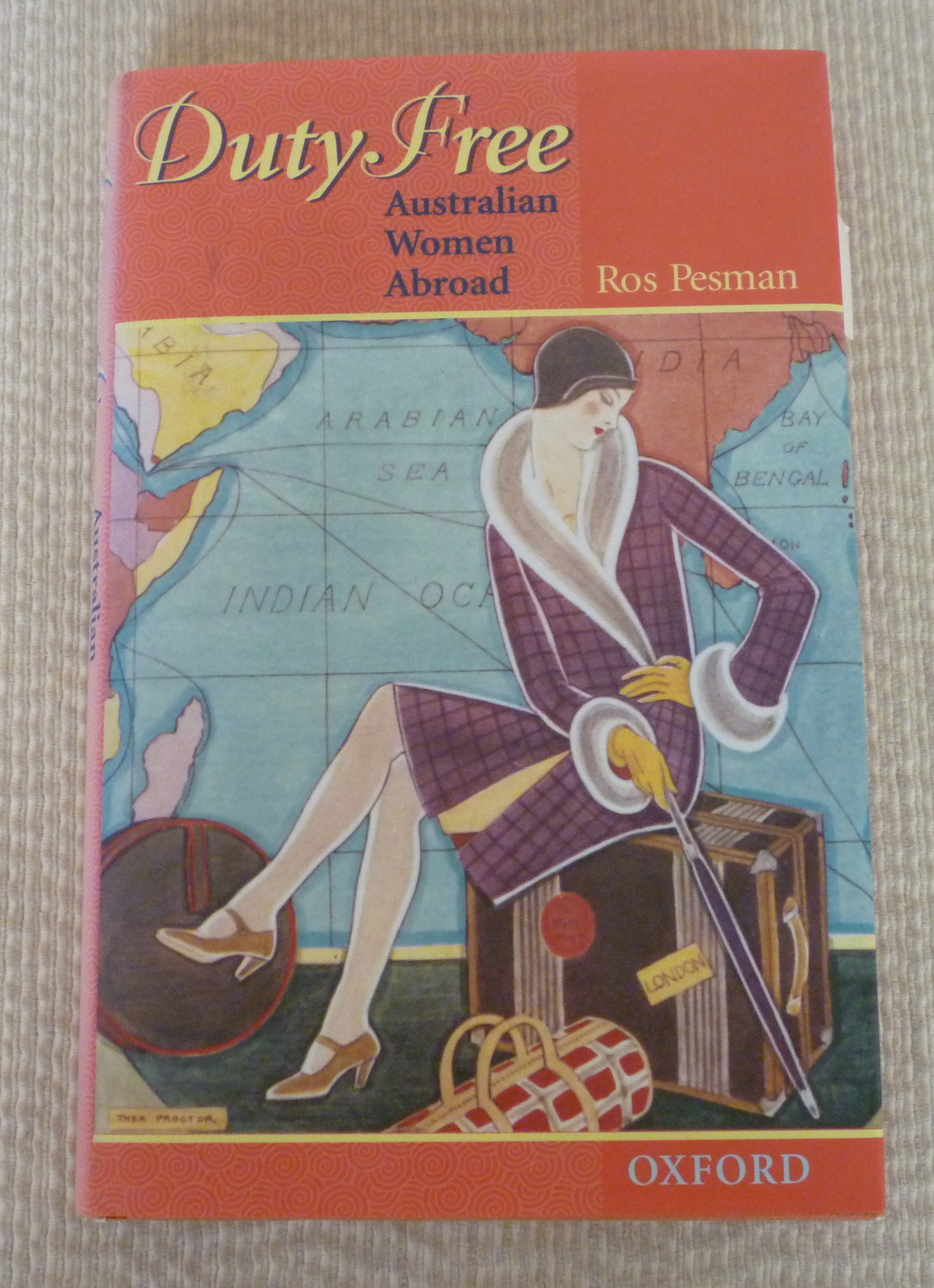
Dust jacket of Duty Free by Ros Pesman, showing artwork by Thea Proctor from the October 1929 issue of The Home magazine

- 1982 A volume of Italian Renaissance studies (with Conal Condren), Frederick May Foundation for Italian Studies, University of Sydney ISBN 0-909798-27-3
- 1990 Alessandro Malaspina, an Italian life in the Pacific: papers of a conference held at History House, 11 May 1990 University of Sydney, Frederick May Foundation for Italian Studies ISBN 0-86758-349-5
- 1992 History at Sydney, 1891–1991: centenary reflections (with Barbara Caine) History Dept., University of Sydney, [Sydney] ISBN 0-08-675863-2
- 1996 The Oxford Book of Australian Travel Writing (with David Walker and Richard White) Oxford University Press
- 1996 Duty Free: Australian Women Abroad Melbourne, Oxford University Press Australia ISBN 0-19-553639-8
- 2002 Pier Soderini and the ruling class in Renaissance Florence Goldbach: Keip, ISBN 3-8051-0961-X
- 2005 From paesani to global Italians: Veneto migrants in Australia (with Loretta Baldassar) Crawley, W.A.: University of Western Australia Press ISBN 1-920694-50-1
- 2008 Australians in Italy: contemporary lives and impressions (ed with Bill Kent and Cynthia Troup) Clayton, Victoria, Monash University ePress ISBN 978-0-9803616-8-1
