= Camille Alaphilippe =

French sculptor

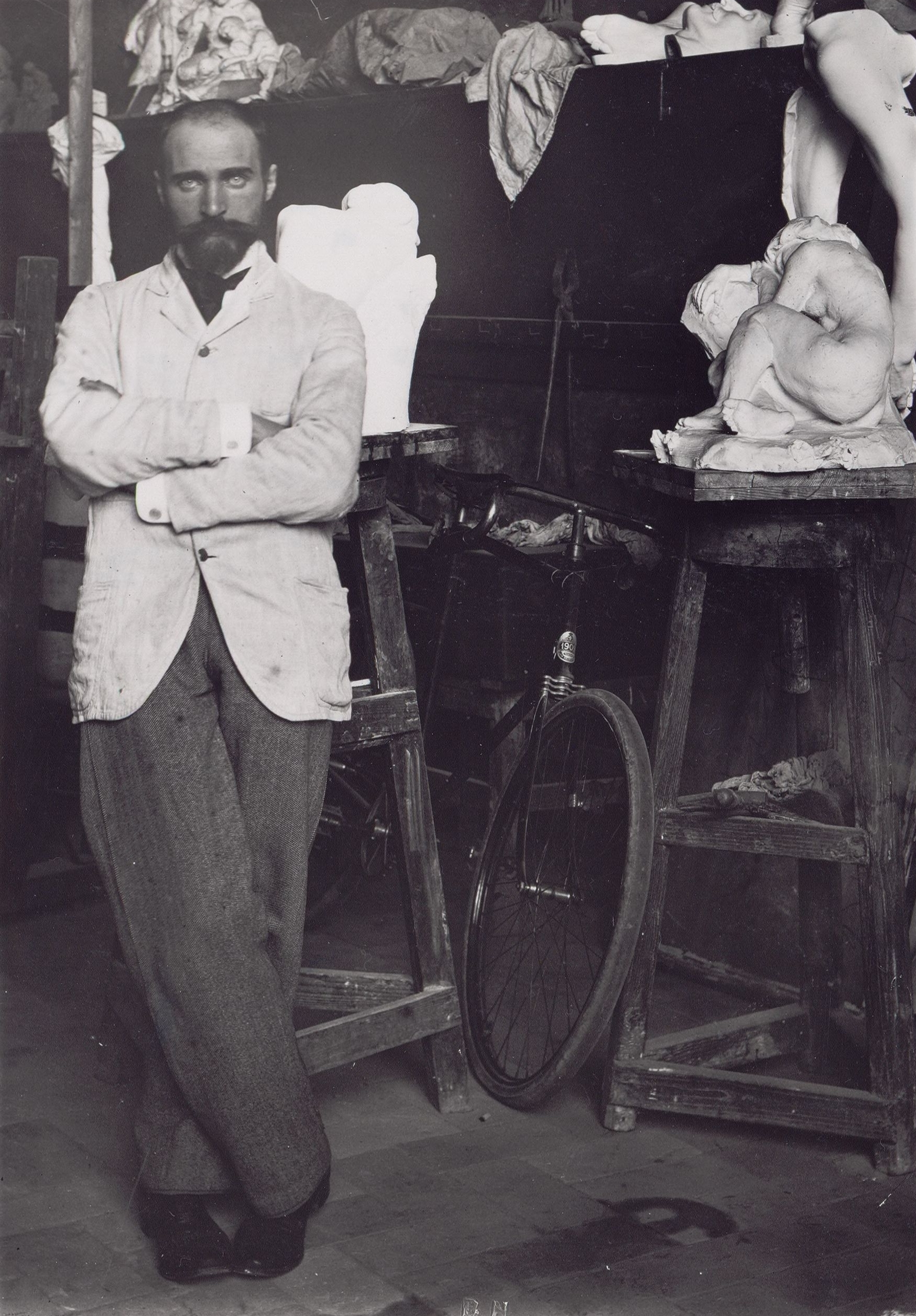

Camille Alaphilippe (1874 – after 1934) was a French sculptor.

== Early life ==
Alaphilippe was born in Tours in 1874. At the age of 19, he was the pupil of Jean-Paul Laurens and Louis-Ernest Barrias to the École nationale supérieure des beaux-arts of Paris.

In 1898, at 24, he won the first great Prix de Rome in sculpture with a statue on the subject Caïn après la mort d'Abel poursuivi par la vengeance céleste or Caïn après la mort d'Abel entend la malédiction de l'Éternel.

== Death ==
He died in Algeria sometime after 1934.

== Major works ==
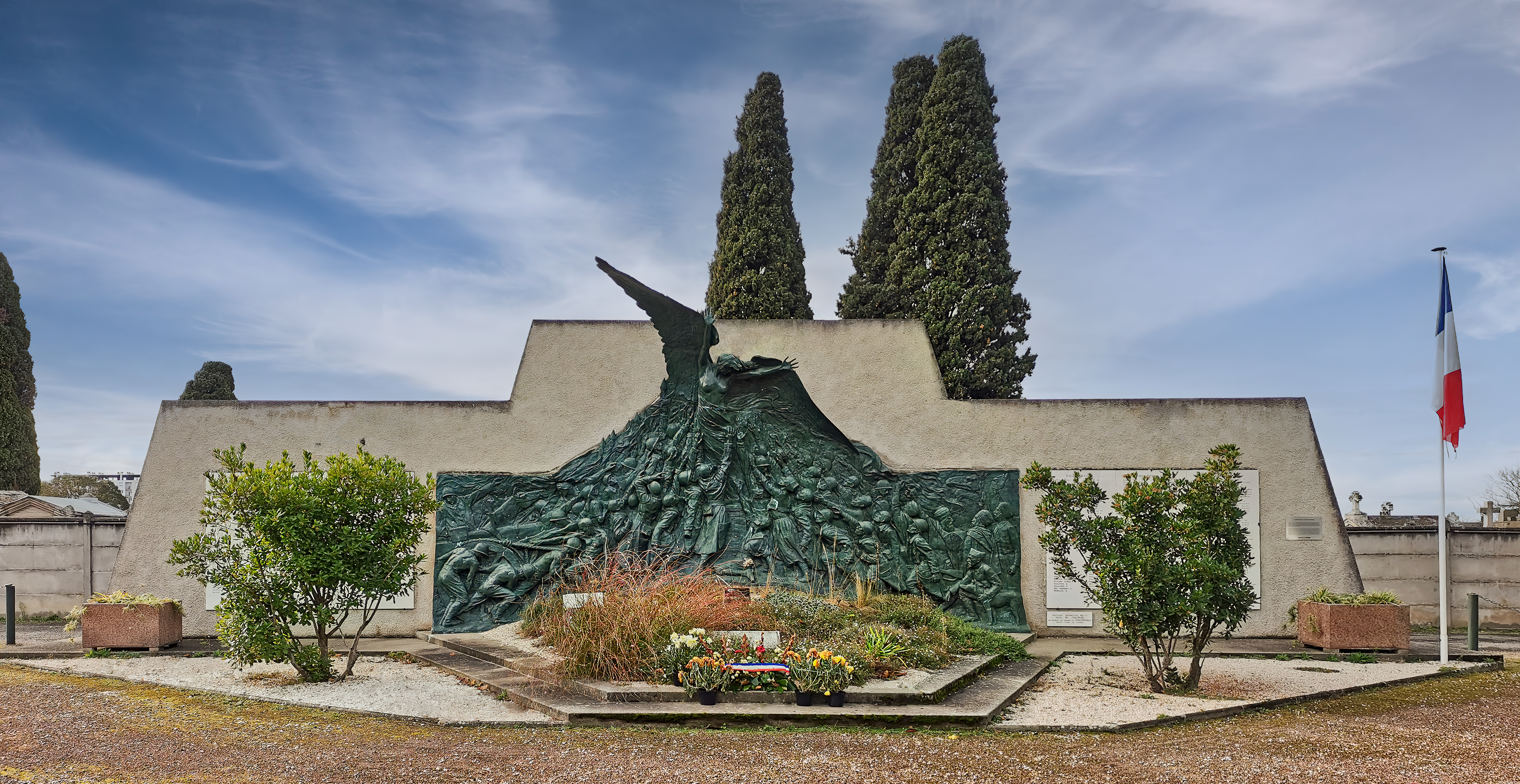
The Monument aux morts de Philippeville, by Alaphilippe, transferred since 1969 to Toulouse

- Caïn après la mort d'Abel poursuivi par la vengeance céleste, 1898, École nationale supérieure des beaux-arts
- La Consolation, 1901
- Mystères douloureux, 1905, Mirabeau garden in Tours
- La Femme au singe, 1908, museum of Petit Palais in Paris
- Monument aux morts de Philippeville, Skikda in Algeria, transferred to Toulouse
